= Fernando Alonso =

Spanish racing driver (born 1981)

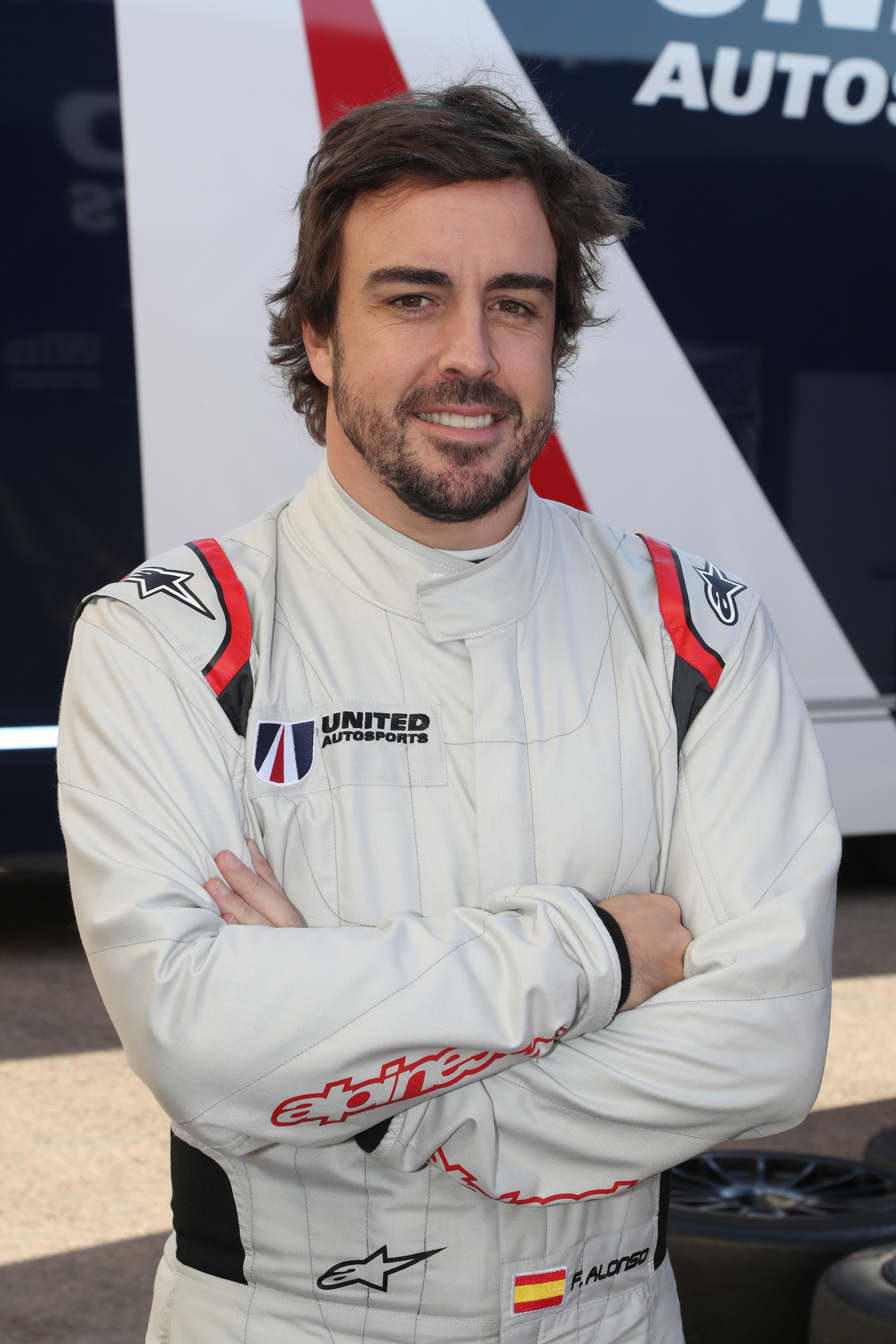
- Alonso in 2017
- Born: Fernando Alonso Díaz; 29 July 1981 (age 45); Oviedo, Asturias, Spain
- Spouse: Raquel del Rosario (m. 2006; div. 2011)
- Partners: Lara Álvarez (2014–2016); Linda Morselli (2016–2021); Melissa Jiménez (2023–present)
- Children: 1
- Awards: Full list

Formula One World Championship career
- Nationality: (Spain) Spanish
- 2026 team: Aston Martin Aramco-Honda
- Car number: 14
- Entries: 448 (445 starts)
- Championships: 2 (2005, 2006)
- Wins: 32
- Podiums: 106
- Career points: 2400
- Pole positions: 22
- Fastest laps: 26
- First entry: 2001 Australian Grand Prix
- First win: 2003 Hungarian Grand Prix
- Last win: 2013 Spanish Grand Prix
- Last entry: 2026 São Paulo Grand Prix
- 2025 position: 10th (56 pts)

FIA World Endurance Championship career
- Categorisation: FIA Platinum
- Years active: 2018–19
- Teams: Toyota
- Starts: 8
- Championships: 1 (2018–19)
- Wins: 5
- Podiums: 7
- Poles: 4
- Fastest laps: 2
- Best finish: 1st in 2018–19 (LMP1)

IndyCar Series career
- 2 races run over 3 years
- Team: Arrow McLaren
- Best finish: 21st (2017)
- First race: 2017 Indianapolis 500 (Indianapolis)
- Last race: 2020 Indianapolis 500 (Indianapolis)
Wins	Podiums	Poles
0	0	0

24 Hours of Le Mans career
- Years: 2018–2019
- Teams: Toyota
- Best finish: 1st (2018, 2019)
- Class wins: 2 (2018, 2019)

Previous series
- 2000; 1999: International F3000; Euro Open by Nissan

Championship titles
- 2019; 1999: 24 Hours of Daytona; Euro Open by Nissan
Medal record
Motor racing
Representing Spain
Race of Champions
Winner	2001 Gran Canaria	Team

Fernando Alonso Díaz (Spanish pronunciation: [feɾˈnando aˈlonso ˈði.aθ]; born 29 July 1981) is a Spanish racing driver who competes in Formula One for Aston Martin. Alonso has won two Formula One World Drivers' Championship titles, which he won in 2005 and 2006 with Renault, and has won 32 Grands Prix across 23 seasons. In endurance racing, Alonso won the 2018–19 FIA World Endurance Championship and is a two-time winner of the 24 Hours of Le Mans with Toyota as well as a winner of the 24 Hours of Daytona in 2019 with WTR. He is the only driver to have won both the Formula One World Drivers' Championship and the World Sportscar/World Endurance Drivers' Championship.

Born and raised in Oviedo to a working-class family, Alonso began kart racing aged seven and won the CIK-FIA Five Continents Cup in 1996. He progressed to junior formulae aged 17, winning the Euro Open by Nissan in 1999 before finishing fourth in International Formula 3000. Alonso signed for Minardi in 2001, making his Formula One debut at the Australian Grand Prix. After a non-scoring rookie season, he joined Renault as a test driver before his promotion to a full-time seat in 2003; he became the then-youngest polesitter and race winner at the Malaysian and Hungarian Grands Prix, respectively, before achieving several podiums across his 2004 campaign. Alonso won his maiden title after winning seven Grands Prix in 2005, becoming the first World Drivers' Champion from Spain and the then-youngest in Formula One history, aged 24. He successfully defended his title from Michael Schumacher in 2006. Alonso moved to McLaren for 2007, finishing one point behind champion Kimi Räikkönen and returning to Renault amidst inter-team tensions. He won multiple races in 2008—including the controversial Singapore Grand Prix—before enduring a winless 2009 campaign.

Alonso signed for Ferrari in 2010, finishing runner-up to Sebastian Vettel by four points in the third-placed F10. He took a single victory in 2011 as Red Bull consolidated their advantage, before finishing runner-up to Vettel again in 2012 and 2013—the former by three points and the latter in the third-placed F138. After a winless 2014 season amidst new engine regulations, Alonso returned to McLaren under Honda power in 2015. He remained with the team until the end of 2018, resulting in limited success, before his first retirement. Alonso then moved into sportscar racing with Toyota, winning the FIA World Endurance Championship, and the 24 Hours of Le Mans twice. He returned to Formula One in 2021 with Alpine, recording his first podium in seven years at the Qatar Grand Prix, and breaking the record for most career starts in 2022. Alonso moved to Aston Martin for his 2023 campaign, achieving several podiums as he finished fourth in the World Drivers' Championship; he scored his 100th career podium at the Saudi Arabian Grand Prix. In 2024, he became the first driver to contest 400 Grands Prix.

As of the 2026 São Paulo Grand Prix, Alonso has achieved 32 race wins, 22 pole positions, 26 fastest laps, and 106 podiums in Formula One. Alonso is contracted to remain at Aston Martin until at least the end of the 2027 season. In addition to holding the most race starts (445), his longevity has broken several Formula One records. (Note: Including most entries (448).) Alonso won the 2001 Race of Champions Nations' Cup, and entered the Indianapolis 500 in 2017, 2019 and 2020. He runs a driver management firm and has been a UNICEF Goodwill Ambassador since 2005. Alonso has been awarded the Gold Medal of the Royal Order of Sports Merit and twice been inducted into the FIA Hall of Fame.

== Early life and karting career ==
Alonso was born on 29 July 1981 to a working-class family in Oviedo, Asturias, Northern Spain. He is the son of the mine shaft explosives factory mechanic and amateur kart driver José Luis Alonso, and his wife, the department store employee Ana Díaz. Alonso has an elder sister, Lorena, who is a doctor.

Alonso was educated at the Holy Guardian Angel Primary School (Spanish: Santo Ángel de la Guarda) in Oviedo from 1985 to 1995 under the Basic Education System (Spanish: Educación General Básica). Alonso attended the Institute Leopoldo Alas Clarín of San Lazaro (Spanish: Instituto Leopoldo Alas Clarín de San Lázaro) until his career in motor racing caused him to leave during his Curso de Orientación Universitaria (English: University Orientation Course) in 2000. He was granted a permit to study away from school, after he disobeyed his mother's orders and seldom attended classes. He achieved a good academic performance by asking his classmates for notes and was unproblematic.

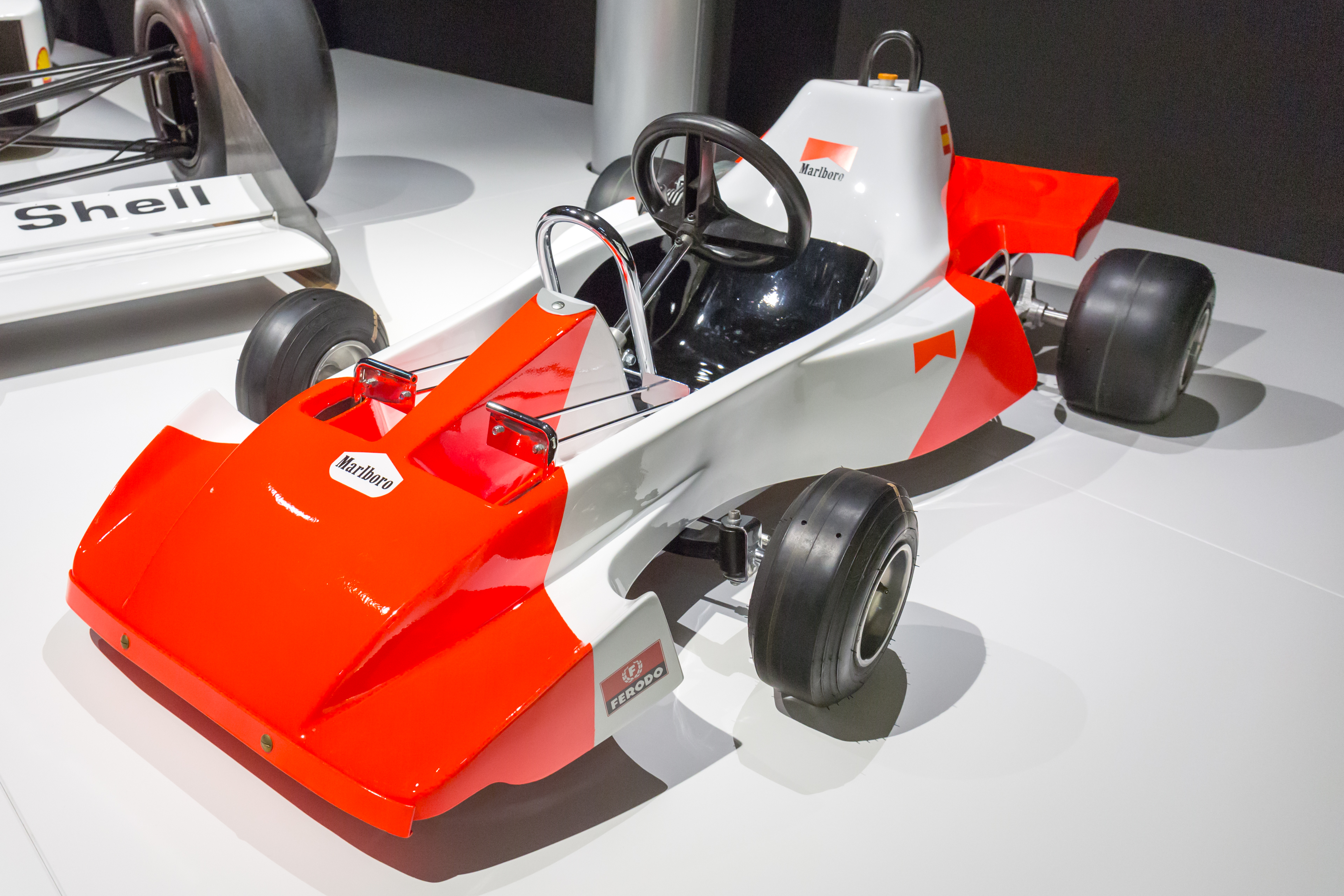
The first go-kart driven by Alonso, which his elder sister did not want to drive

Alonso's father wanted a hobby to share with his children and built a go-kart for Lorena. She was uninterested in karting and a three-year-old Alonso received the kart. The kart's pedals were modified for drive-ability, and the local racing federation granted him a mandatory kart racing license aged five; his father rejected an offer for his son to be a goalkeeper for the RC Celta de Vigo football club. The family lacked the finances required to develop him in karts; they could not purchase rain tyres and forced Alonso to adapt to a wet track on slick tyres. Alonso devised three timing sectors going to school to improve himself daily. His mother sewed his racing overalls and adjusted them as he grew; she also ensured Alonso was academically well off. His father steered the kart early on and was his accountant, counsellor, manager and mechanic.

Aged seven, Alonso won his first kart race in Pola de Laviana. He won the 1988 and 1989 children's junior Championship of the Asturias and Galicia, and progressed to the Cadet class in 1990. Go-kart importer Genís Marcó was impressed by Alonso and mentored him; kart track owner José Luis Echevarria told him about Alonso. Marcó found personal and sponsorship money for Alonso's family to defray financial concerns and allow him to enter European series. He spoke to the six-time Karting World Champion Mike Wilson, who gave Alonso a test session at a track in Parma. Marcó taught Alonso to be conservative and maintain the condition of a kart.

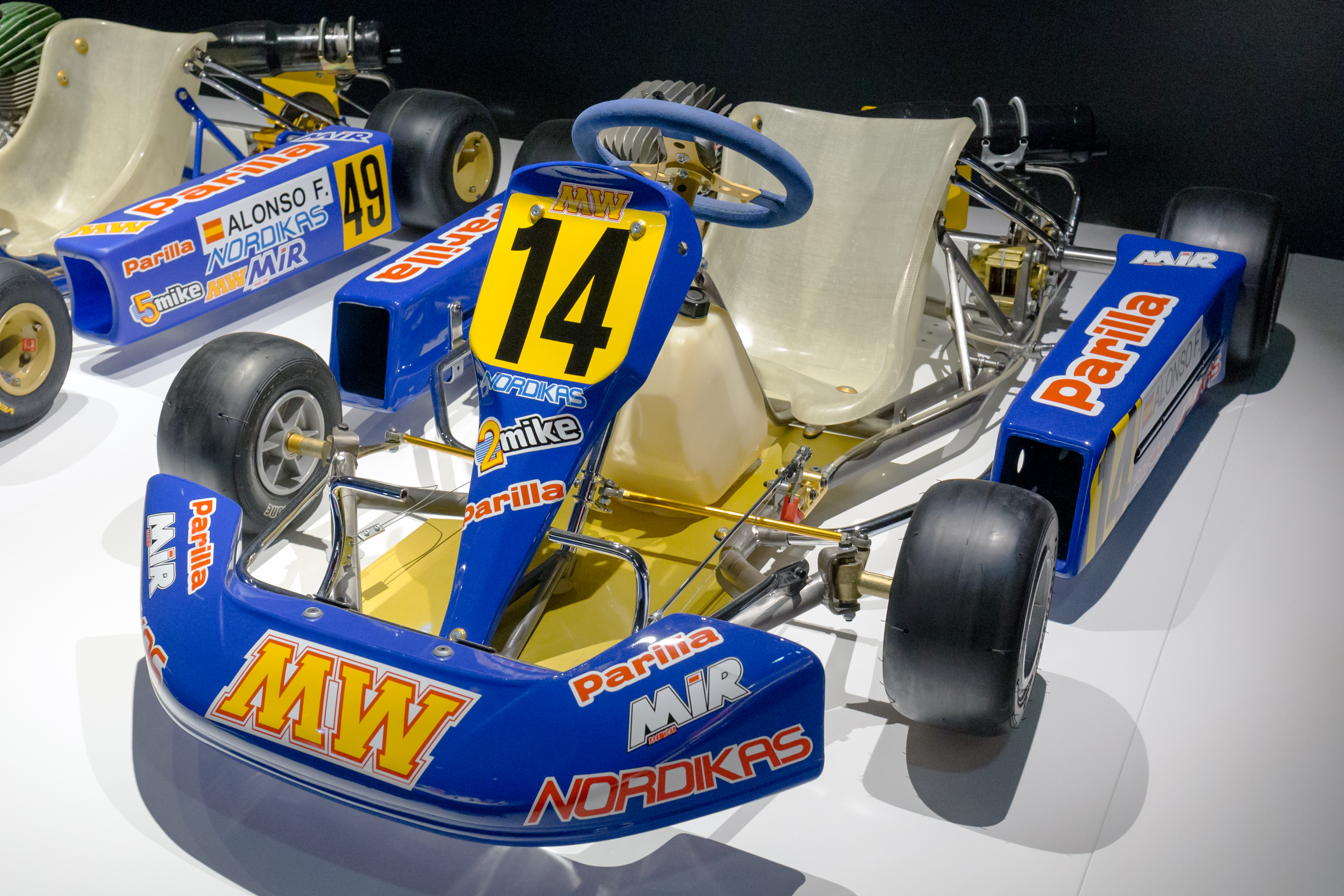
The go-kart Alonso drove to win the Karting World Championship in 1996

Alonso won the 1990 Asturias and the Basque Country Cadet Championship and finished second in the 1991 Spanish Cadet National Championship. The local karting federation allowed him to enter the 100cc class because he was deemed underage to drive more powerful machinery. At a Catalan Karting Championship meet in Móra d'Ebre, Marcó asked Alonso if he wanted to enter the Spanish Karting Championship. Wilson mentored Alonso; he joined the IAME works team in 1993. Alonso won three successive Spanish Junior Championships from 1993 to 1995.

The results allowed him to progress to the world championships. Alonso was third at the 1995 CIK-FIA Rainbow Trophy. Alonso was a mechanic to younger kart drivers to earn money. He won his fourth Spanish Junior Championship, the Trofeo Estival, the Marlboro Masters, and the CIK-FIA Five Continents Cup at Genk in 1996. In 1997, he took the Italian and Spanish Intercontinental A championships and was second in the European Championship with nine wins, the Masters of Paris-Bercy and the Spanish Championship.

== Motor racing career ==
=== Junior racing career ===
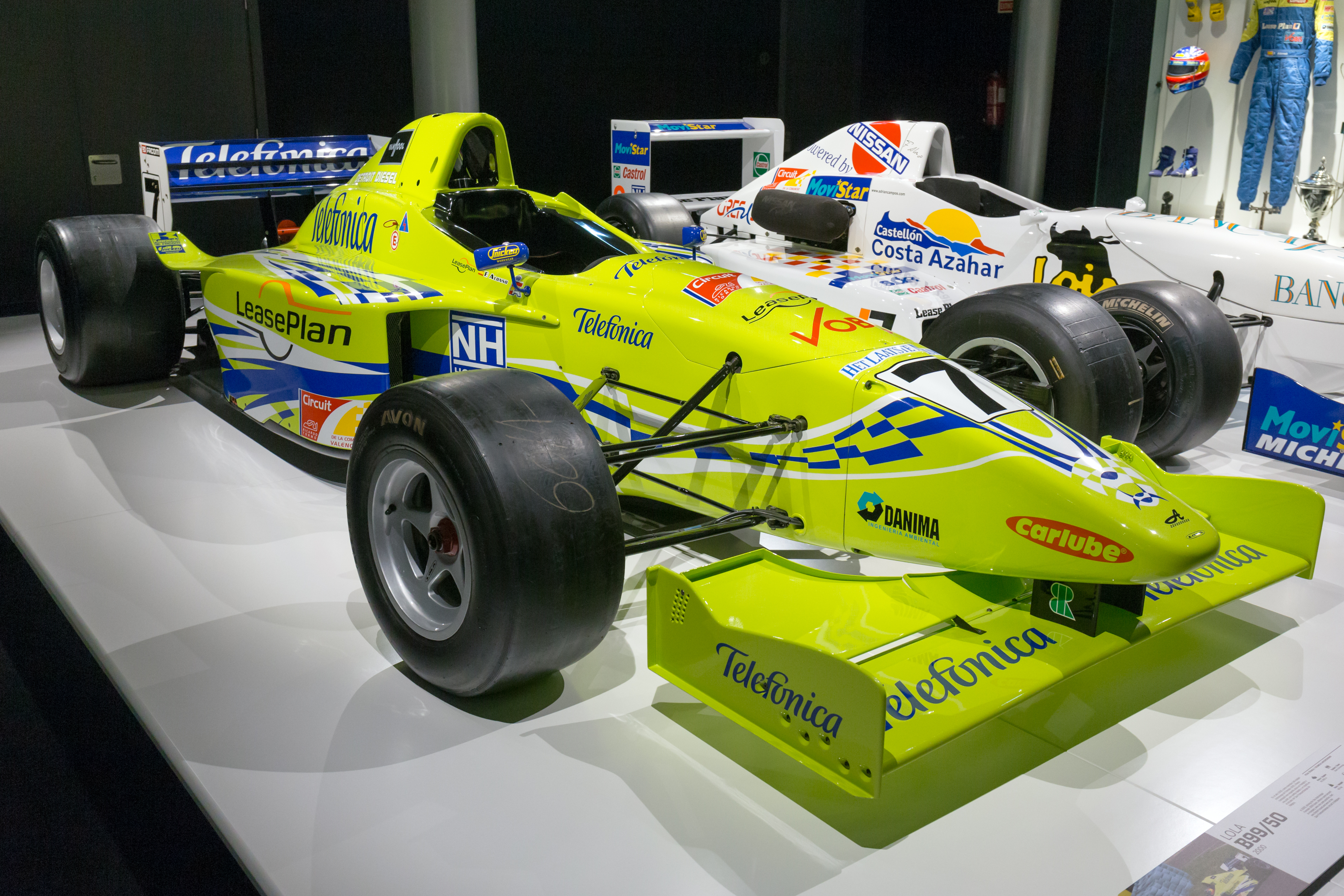
The Lola B99/50 Alonso drove in the 2000 International Formula 3000 Championship.

Aged seventeen, Alonso made his car racing debut in the 1999 Euro Open by Nissan with Campos Motorsport, winning the title from Manuel Gião at the final race of the season with six wins and nine pole positions. (Note: Gião filed an appeal under the belief Alonso had passed him under yellow flag conditions. The appeal was rejected because Gião had filed it through his manager and not his team; officials subsequently confirmed Alonso's championship win.) For 2000, he progressed to the higher-tier International Formula 3000 Championship with the Minardi-backed Team Astromega, after a sponsorship agreement with driver Robert Lechner fell through. Alonso finished second at the Hungaroring and won the season-ending round at Circuit de Spa-Francorchamps for fourth overall with seventeen points.

=== Formula One ===
==== Minardi and Renault (2001–2006) ====
Cesare Fiorio, the sports director, gave Alonso a test in a Formula One (F1) car at the Circuito de Jerez in December 1999, as part of the Euro Open by Nissan's organising company RPM's agreement to give its series champion an opportunity to test at a higher level. He was Minardi's test and reserve driver in 2000 before joining its race team in 2001. In a non-competitive car, Alonso's best result of the season was a tenth-place finish in the German Grand Prix and scored no points for 23rd overall.

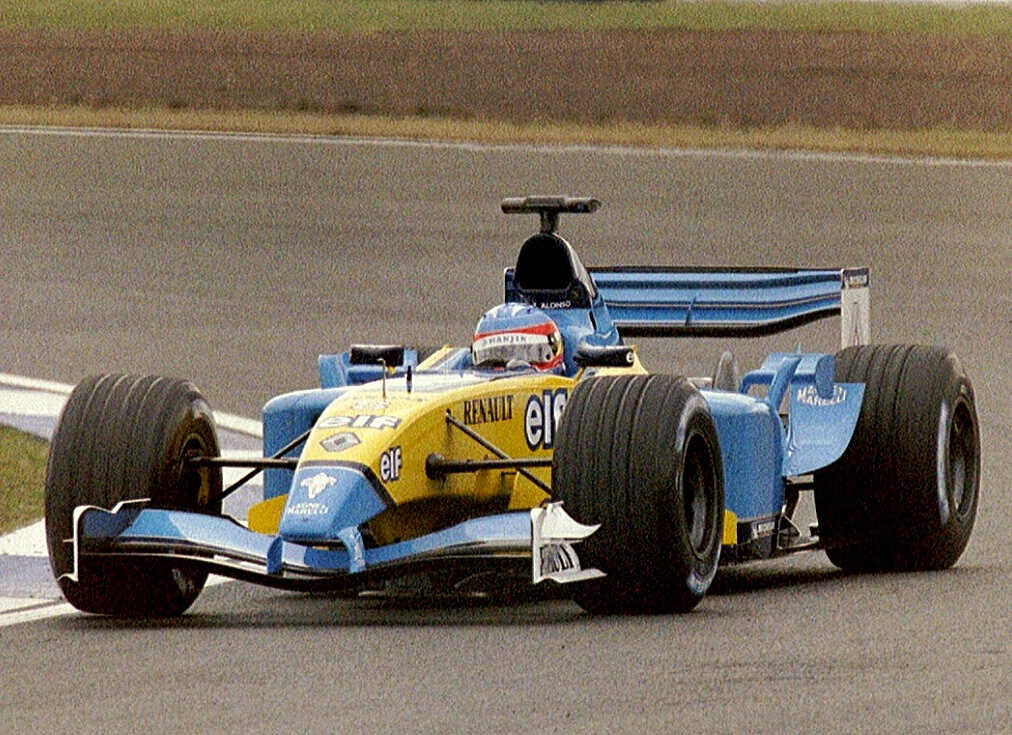
Alonso at the 2003 British Grand Prix

Alonso signed as Renault's test driver for 2002 per the orders of manager Flavio Briatore to familiarise himself with the team and improve himself for the future. Alonso worked with the engineering department to improve Giancarlo Fisichella's and Jenson Button's performance, and tested in Spain and the United Kingdom. He drove a Jaguar in an evaluation session against test drivers André Lotterer and James Courtney at the Silverstone Circuit in May 2002. Alonso was promoted to the Renault race team for 2003. He went on to break the records of youngest driver to win a pole position at the season's second race, the Malaysian Grand Prix, and broke Bruce McLaren's record as the youngest F1 race winner at the Hungarian Grand Prix later in the year. (Note: Sebastian Vettel is the current holder of the youngest Formula One pole position starter and youngest one and two-time world champion.) He achieved four podium finishes in 2003 and was sixth in the World Drivers' Championship with 55 points.

Alonso remained with Renault for 2004. Alonso had an improved season: he finished the season-opening Australian Grand Prix in third position and took three more podium finishes that year. He took pole position for the French Grand Prix but achieved no race victories en route to fourth in the World Drivers' Championship with 59 points. Alonso stayed at Renault for 2005. He duelled with McLaren driver Kimi Räikkönen for the World Championship in 2005 due to regulation changes prohibiting teams from changing tyres during a race and requiring engines to last for two races before they could be changed. Alonso's car was more reliable than Räikkönen's albeit lacking in speed. Alonso eclipsed Emerson Fittipaldi as the youngest World Drivers' Champion, having won seven victories, six pole positions and fourteen podium finishes for 133 points altogether.

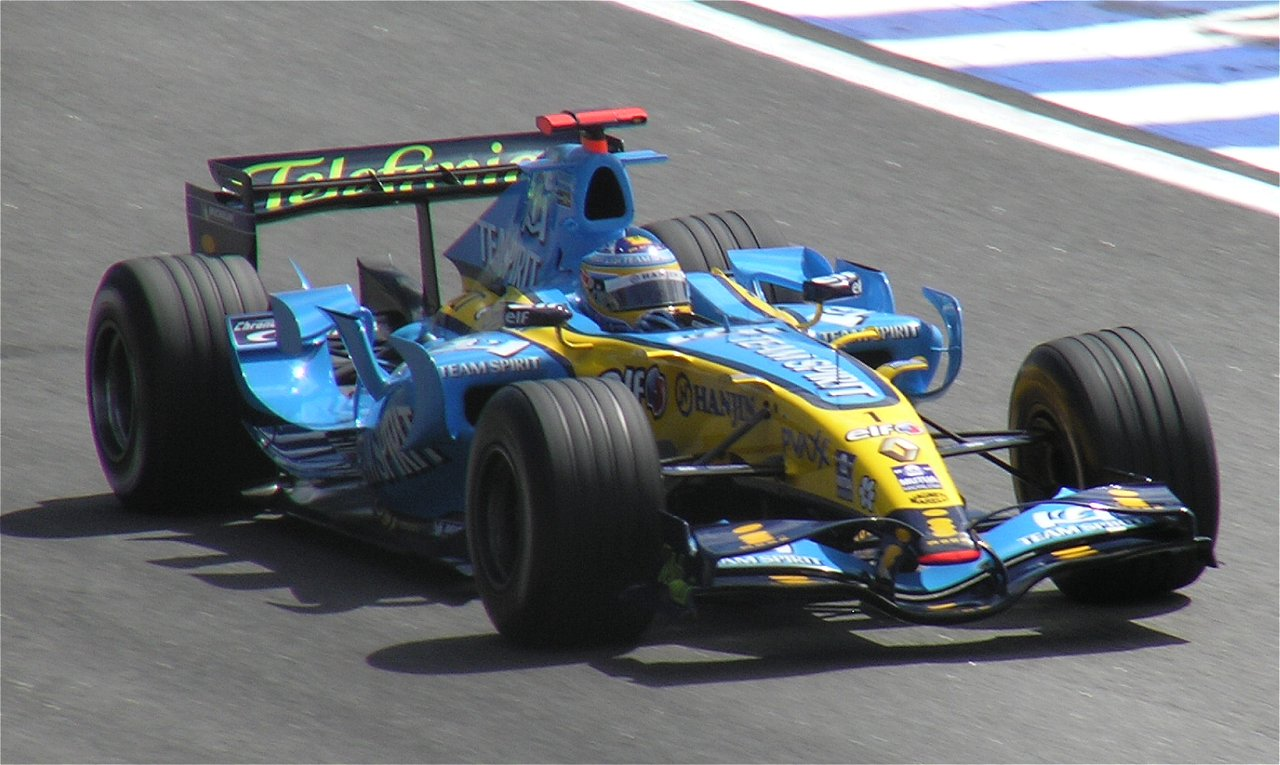
Alonso won his second World Drivers' Championship at the 2006 Brazilian Grand Prix

Alonso signed a contract extension with Renault for 2006 in April 2005. Bookmakers installed Alonso as the favourite to retain the Drivers' Championship. His primary competition was Ferrari driver Michael Schumacher. Alonso won six of the first nine races and finished no lower than second to lead the championship with 84 out of a possible 90 points. An Fédération Internationale de l'Automobile (FIA; F1's governing body)-imposed ban on Renault's tuned mass damper device to slow Alonso and an increase of development into Schumacher's Ferrari for competitiveness saw the two tied on points entering the season's penultimate round, the Japanese Grand Prix. Alonso won the race as Schumacher retired due to an engine failure whilst leading. He needed to score one point at the season-ending Brazilian Grand Prix for a second title. Alonso won the championship by finishing second and was Formula 1's youngest double World Champion.

==== McLaren and second stint with Renault (2007–2009) ====
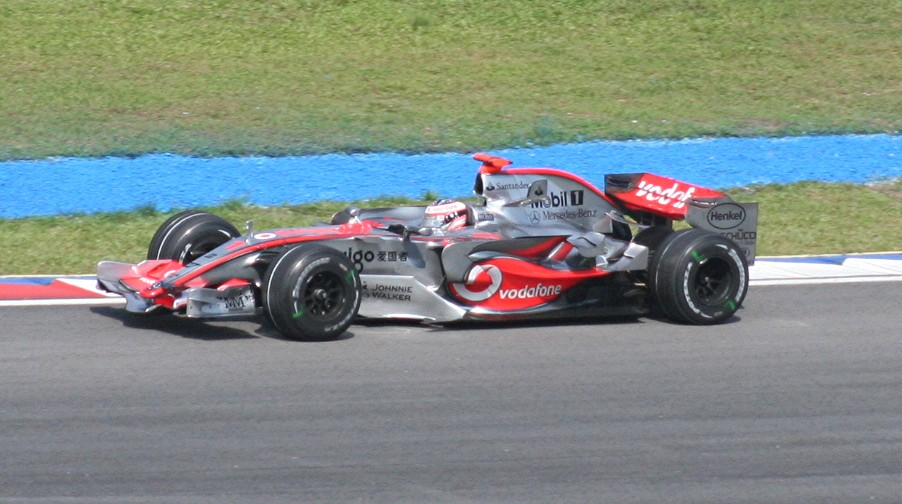
Alonso en route to victory at the 2007 Malaysian Grand Prix

Alonso and McLaren team owner Ron Dennis met secretly in Japan after Dennis talked to Alonso about driving for the team in the future and Alonso expressed interest in the idea. Both men agreed to a three-year contract for Alonso to drive for McLaren starting from 2007. Alonso's contract with Renault expired on 31 December 2006, and he was not granted an early release for sponsorship reasons. Renault allowed Alonso to make his first appearance for McLaren in a test session at the Circuito de Jerez in November 2006. His main competitors in 2007 were his teammate Lewis Hamilton and Räikkönen at Ferrari. Alonso achieved four Grand Prix victories in Malaysia, Monaco, Europe and Italy and led the championship until Hamilton overtook him. Prior to the season's final round, the Brazilian Grand Prix, he had 103 championship points to Räikkönen's 100 and Hamilton's 107, and needed to win the race and for his teammate to finish third or lower for his third title. Alonso finished the event third for third overall with 109 points. He had the same number of points as Hamilton; the tie was broken on count-back as Hamilton finished second more often than Alonso.

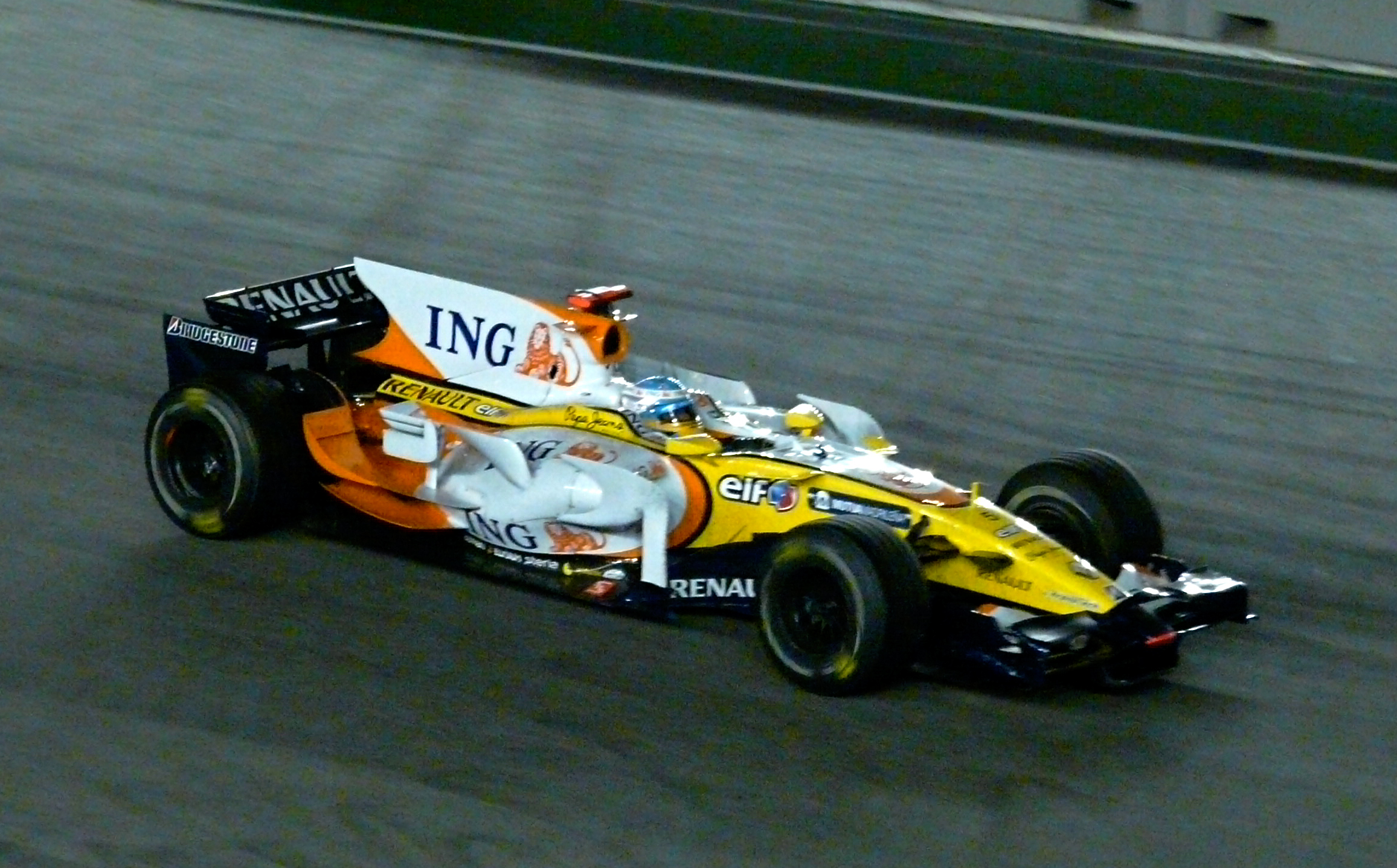
Alonso took a controversial victory at the 2008 Singapore Grand Prix, after his teammate, Nelson Piquet Jr., was ordered to crash deliberately.

Throughout the season, Alonso and Hamilton were involved in a number of incidents, such as the espionage scandal and the flare-up during qualifying for the Hungarian Grand Prix when Hamilton disobeyed a team instruction, thus disadvantaging Alonso, and Alonso responded by delaying Hamilton in the pit lane. The tensions culminated in Alonso and McLaren terminating their contract by mutual consent in November. Alonso was forbidden from joining a team whom McLaren considered their primary challengers for 2008. After rejecting offers from several teams, he signed a two-year contract to rejoin Renault from 2008 because of the manufacturer's long-term commitment to F1 and on-track record. Alonso's car lacked power early on due to an imposed moratorium in development and he scored nine points in the first seven races. He was thereafter able to improve his performance later due to aerodynamic developments to the car's and won in Singapore and Japan; the former race saw Renault order his teammate Nelson Piquet Jr. to crash deliberately and trigger the deployment of the safety car in what became known as "crashgate". Alonso scored more points than any other driver in the final five races with 43. He scored 61 points for fifth in the Drivers' Championship.

Alonso was due to become a free agent for 2009 if Renault were lower than third in the Constructors' Championship. After offers from Red Bull Racing and Honda, he re-signed to Renault on a two-year contract. His car proved to be noncompetitive because it lacked a dual diffuser system and outright speed. Alonso eschewed an aerodynamic front wing mandated in an attempt to make overtaking more possible since he did not believe it would help him. He scored points in eight races and achieved one podium finish: a third place at the Singapore Grand Prix. Alonso won pole position for the Hungarian Grand Prix and led the first twelve laps before he retired following an incorrectly fitted right-front wheel. Alonso was ninth in the Drivers' Championship with 26 points, his lowest placing since he came sixth in 2003; he maintained his reputation as one of F1's best drivers.

==== Ferrari (2010–2014) ====
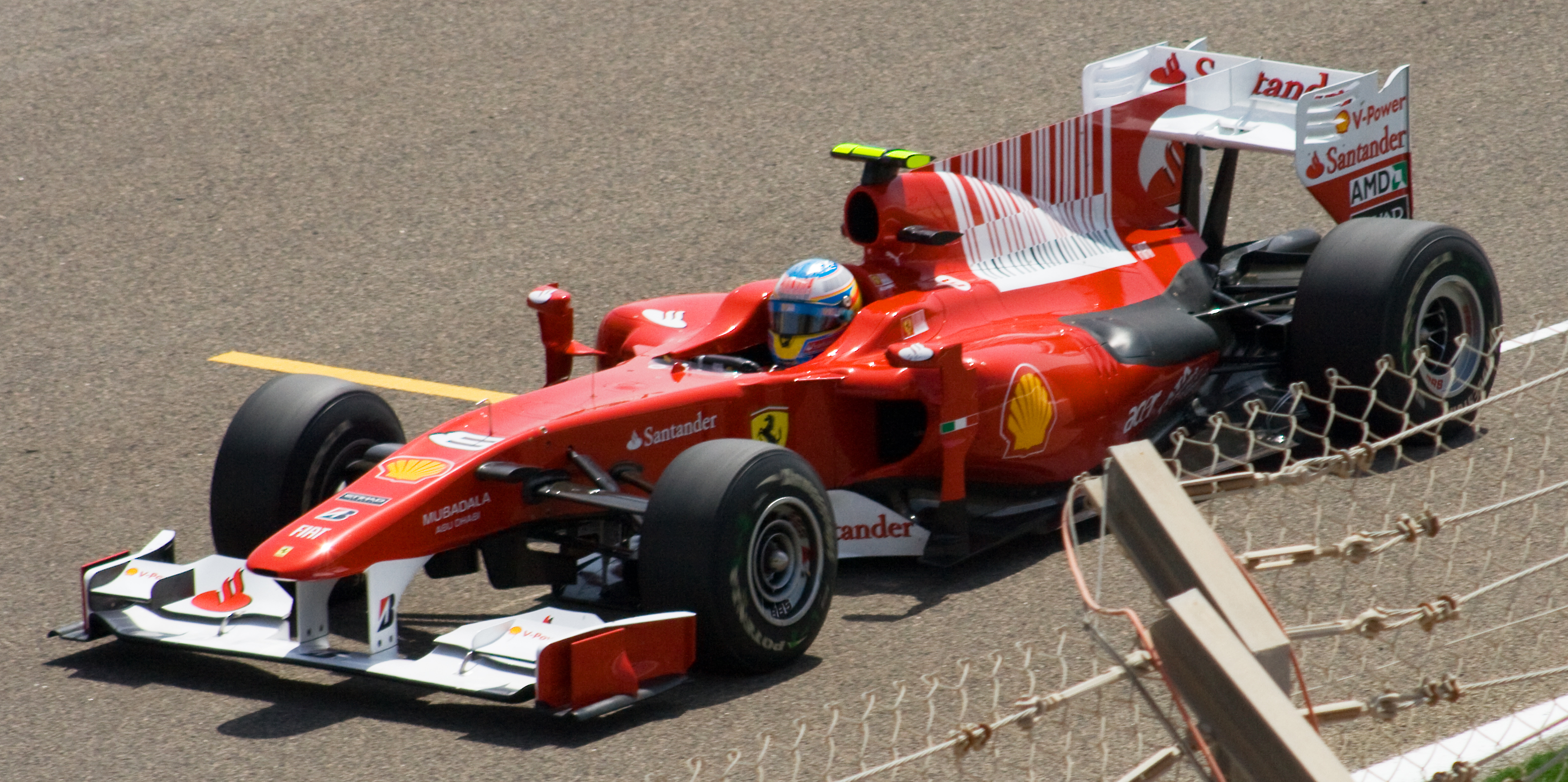
Alonso won on his debut with Ferrari at the 2010 Bahrain Grand Prix.

Alonso agreed with Ferrari president Luca Cordero di Montezemolo to drive for Ferrari in 2009, but team principal Jean Todt extended the contracts of both Felipe Massa and Räikkönen to 2010. Alonso obtained a mid-2009 agreement to drive for Ferrari from 2011 on but it was moved to 2010 after Renault were investigated for race fixing in Singapore and Räikkönen was released from the team. McLaren's Hamilton and Button and Red Bull's Sebastian Vettel and Mark Webber were Alonso's main championship competition. He won five races that season and entered the season-ending Abu Dhabi Grand Prix leading by eight points after being 47 behind mid-season following errors. Alonso finished runner-up to Vettel after finishing seventh thereby losing nineteen points to Vettel who won the race.

Alonso's 2011 season was mixed: his car was built conservatively and lacked aerodynamic grip and tyre handling in qualifying. He extracted additional pace from his car to claim ten podium finishes and win the British Grand Prix after a strategy error from Red Bull. His best qualification of the year was a second at the Canadian Grand Prix and he out-qualified his teammate Massa fifteen times over the course of the season. Alonso was fourth overall with 257 points; he was in contention to finish second to eventual champion Vettel following a series of strong finishes until Webber won the season-ending Brazilian Grand Prix.

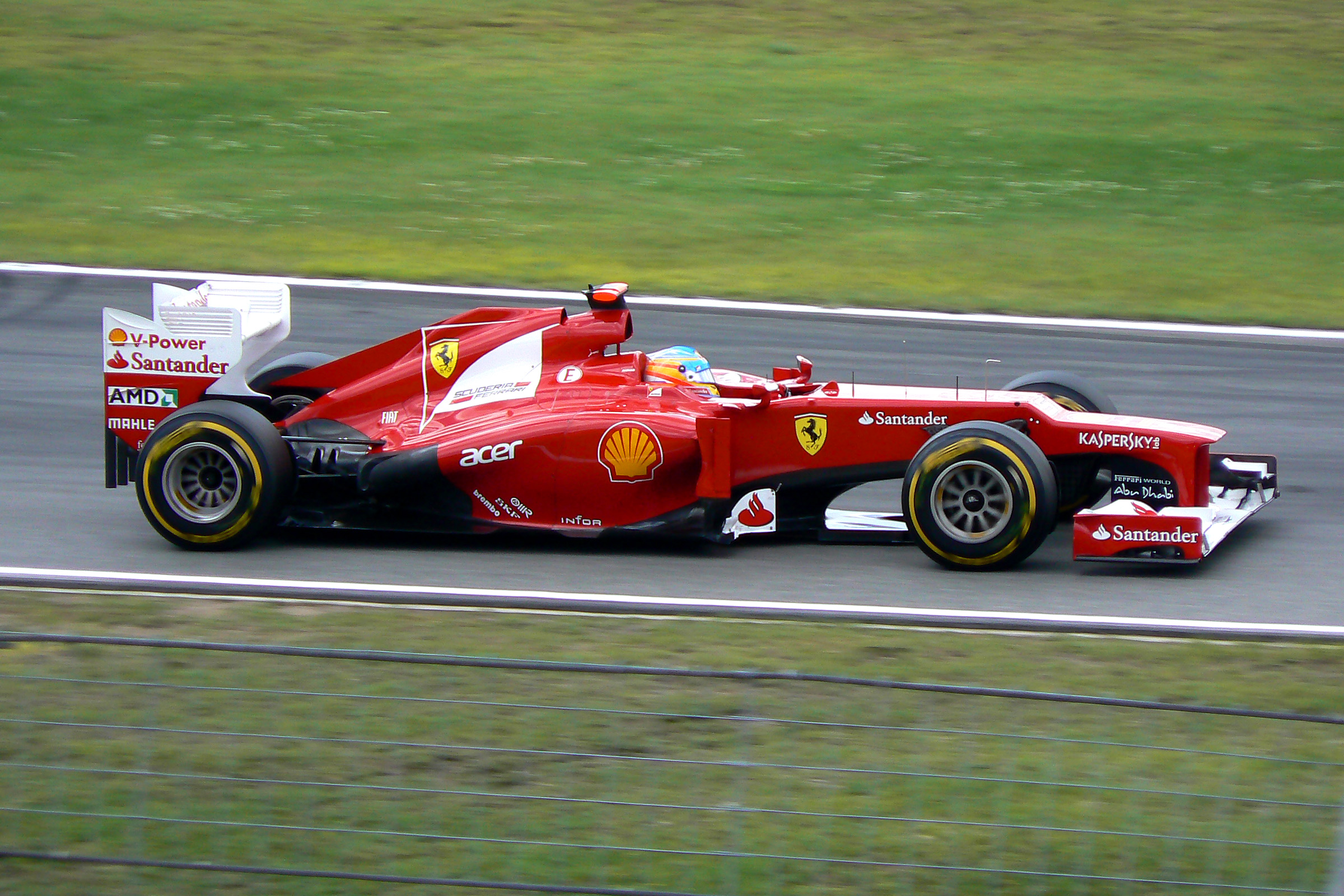
Alonso at the 2012 German Grand Prix

Ahead of 2012, Alonso extended his contract with Ferrari until 2016. His main competition for the title in 2012 was Vettel. Wins in Malaysia, Valencia and Germany and consistent points-scoring finishes allowed him to build a 40-point lead in the Drivers' Championship. Thereafter start-line collisions, a mechanical failure and an improved performance for Vettel eliminated Alonso's points lead. Alonso entered the season-ending Brazilian Grand Prix 13 points behind Vettel and needed to finish third and for Vettel not to score points for a third championship. He was second and Vettel finished fourth, despite spinning on the opening lap, resigning Alonso to be runner-up for the second time in his career on 278 points.

To begin 2013, Alonso drove an aggressively designed car allowing him to win in China and Spain and consistently scored points. He was slower than Vettel after a change of tyre compound at the German Grand Prix and front and rear bodywork components intended to improve his car's performance were ineffective. With 242 points, Alonso was second for the third time in his career. His relationship with Ferrari cooled due to his perception the team could not construct a title-winning car.

Alonso's 2014 season saw him achieve no race wins because his car was less powerful than the championship-winning Mercedes but took third in the Chinese Grand Prix and second in the Hungarian Grand Prix. Alonso fell to sixth in the Drivers' Championship with 161 points. He qualified faster than his teammate Räikkönen sixteen times by an average of more than 1/2 second per lap in 2014.

==== Return to McLaren (2015–2019) ====
Alonso had severe disagreements with team principal Marco Mattiacci in 2014 and left Ferrari after contract negotiations to remain at the team fell through. He rejoined McLaren on a three-year contract from 2015 to 2017 with no opt-out clauses. An accident during a pre-season test session at Spain's Circuit de Barcelona-Catalunya in February 2015 saw Alonso sustain a concussion and he was replaced by reserve driver Kevin Magnussen for the season-opening Australian Grand Prix. He endured a difficult season: his car's Honda engine was under-powered and overall speed leaving him vulnerable to being passed. Alonso scored points twice in 2015: a tenth in the British Grand Prix and a fifth in the Hungarian Grand Prix for seventeenth in the Drivers' Championship with eleven points. He was dissatisfied with a slow pace, which became evident after multiple radio complaints that year.

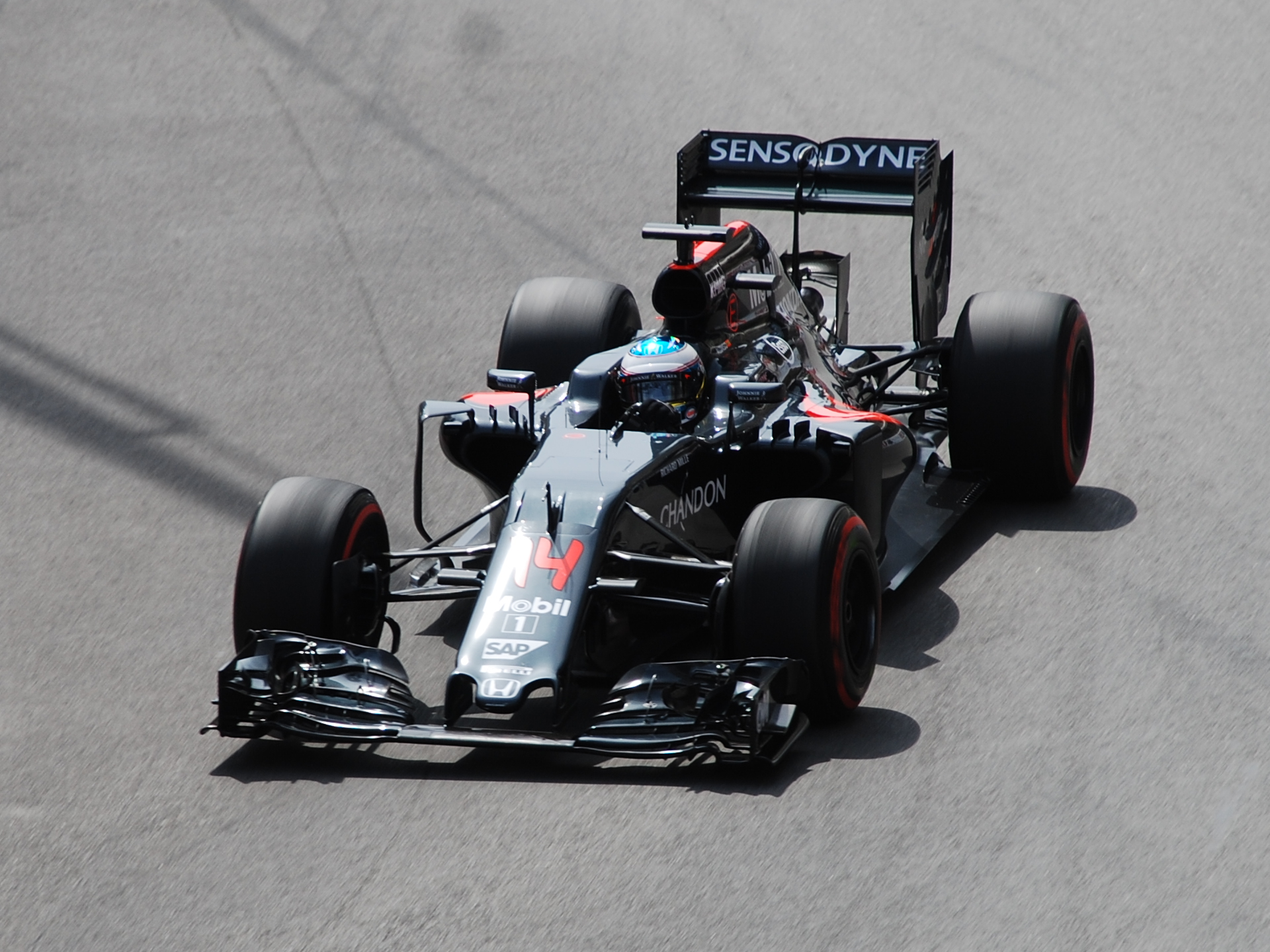
Alonso at the 2016 Monaco Grand Prix

Despite the unreliable and noncompetitive car, Alonso remained with McLaren for 2016. Injuries from a heavy crash with Esteban Gutiérrez at the season-opening Australian Grand Prix caused him to miss the Bahrain Grand Prix on medical grounds and was replaced by reserve driver Stoffel Vandoorne. He qualified better than teammate Button fifteen times and scored points nine times, which included two fifth-place finishes in the Monaco Grand Prix and the United States Grand Prix. He was tenth in the Drivers' Championship with 54 points.

Alonso stayed at McLaren in 2017, but poor reliability affected his season, particularly during the early rounds, and his best finish was a sixth place in the Hungarian Grand Prix. After three consecutive top-ten finishes, Alonso finished fifteenth in the Drivers' Championship with seventeen points.

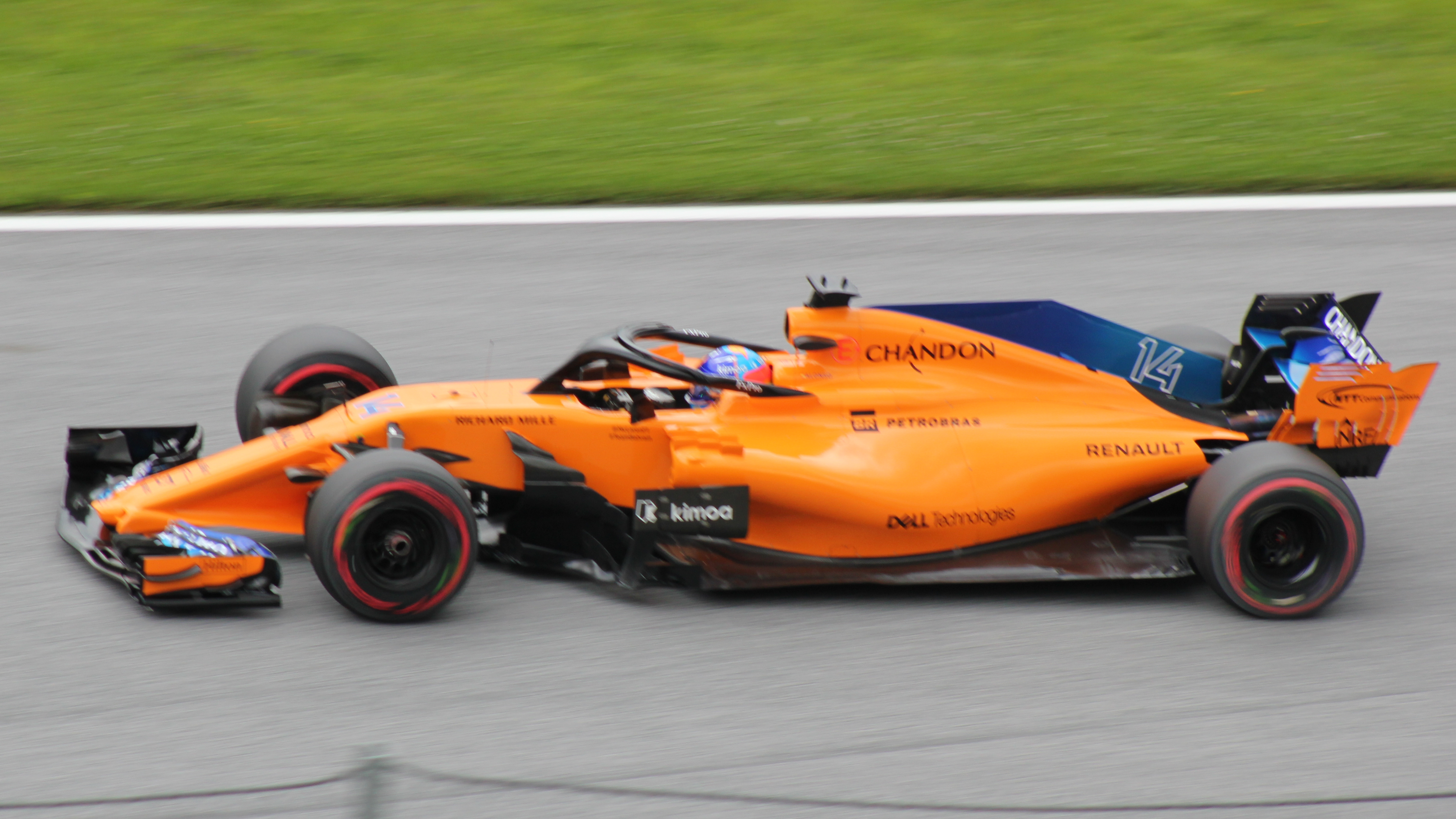
Alonso at the 2018 Austrian Grand Prix

Following contract negotiations with the McLaren CEO Zak Brown, Alonso signed a multi-year extension with McLaren on 19 October 2017. He finished fifth at the season-opening 2018 Australian Grand Prix and took nine top-ten finishes. Alonso out-qualified his teammate Stoffel Vandoorne at every race and drove quickly and aggressively. He became increasingly annoyed with certain drivers and his commitment to F1 waned after McLaren stopped developing their car to focus on 2019. Alonso was eleventh in the Drivers' Championship with fifty points, and left the sport as a driver at the end of the 2018 season, citing a perceived lack of on-track racing, the predictability of results and felt discussions away from racing about the broadcast of radio transmissions and polemics harmed the series.

Alonso remained at McLaren as a brand ambassador to aid and advise drivers and drove in select test sessions to develop their cars. Alonso drove the MCL34 during a two-day in-season post-race Bahrain test in April 2019 to develop tyres for Pirelli. No further runs were planned for him and McLaren focused on their current drivers. Alonso's ambassador contract with McLaren expired at the end of 2019, and was not renewed for 2020.

==== Alpine (2021–2022) ====
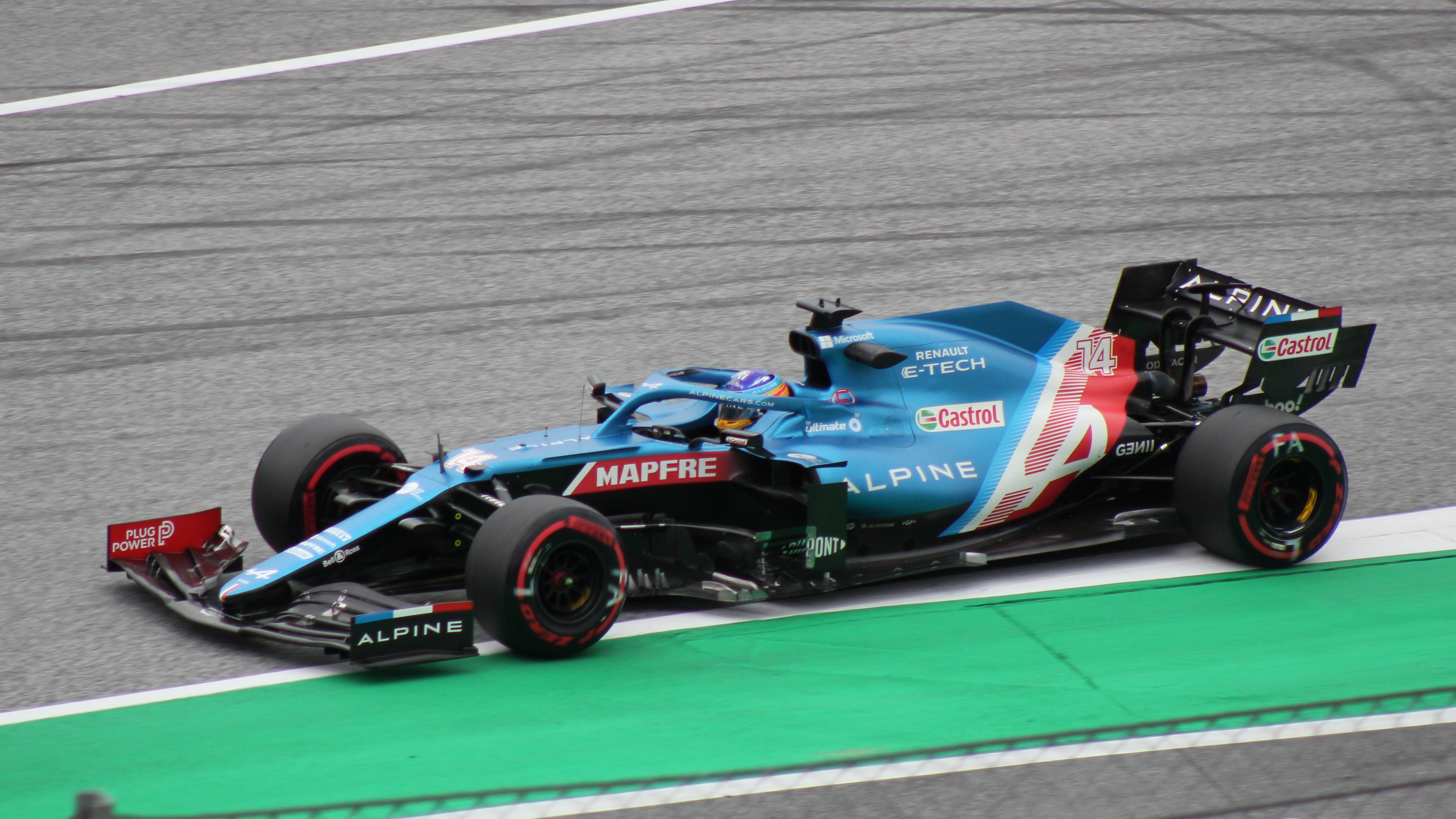
Alonso at the 2021 Austrian Grand Prix, upon his return to Formula One

Alonso was signed to drive for Alpine F1 Team for the 2021 season, alongside Esteban Ocon, with Renault having rebranded the team under its new name. In preparation for his F1 return, Alonso performed four testing days driving the Renault R.S.18 and was quickest in the post-2020 season young driver's test driving the Renault R.S.20 for Renault. In his first race with Alpine at the 2021 Bahrain Grand Prix, Alonso was forced to retire after plastic debris entered his brake duct. At the 2021 Emilia Romagna Grand Prix he finished in eleventh after qualifying fifteenth, with teammate Ocon finishing ahead in tenth, but both were upgraded one position after Kimi Räikkönen was penalised, giving Alonso his first points of the season.

In Hungary, Alonso temporarily led the race before he made a pit stop and fell to fourth, ahead of Lewis Hamilton. Teammate Ocon credited Alonso's defence against Hamilton with enabling him to achieve his first race victory. In August 2021, Alonso invoked an option to extend his contract for the 2022 season. Alonso scored points in multiple races following the summer break, finishing sixth in the Netherlands, eighth in Italy, sixth in Russia, having run in third in Russia before being forced to pit under wet conditions, and third in Qatar. His third place finish at Qatar was his first podium finish since the 2014 Hungarian Grand Prix.

For the 2022 season, Alonso remained with Alpine. Alonso achieved his highest start driving for Alpine during wet qualifying for the Canadian Grand Prix, starting in second, but had to endure questionable strategies and an engine issue that developed during the race. He dropped down to seventh, and furthermore, received a post-race time penalty that dropped him down to ninth.

==== Aston Martin (2023–present) ====
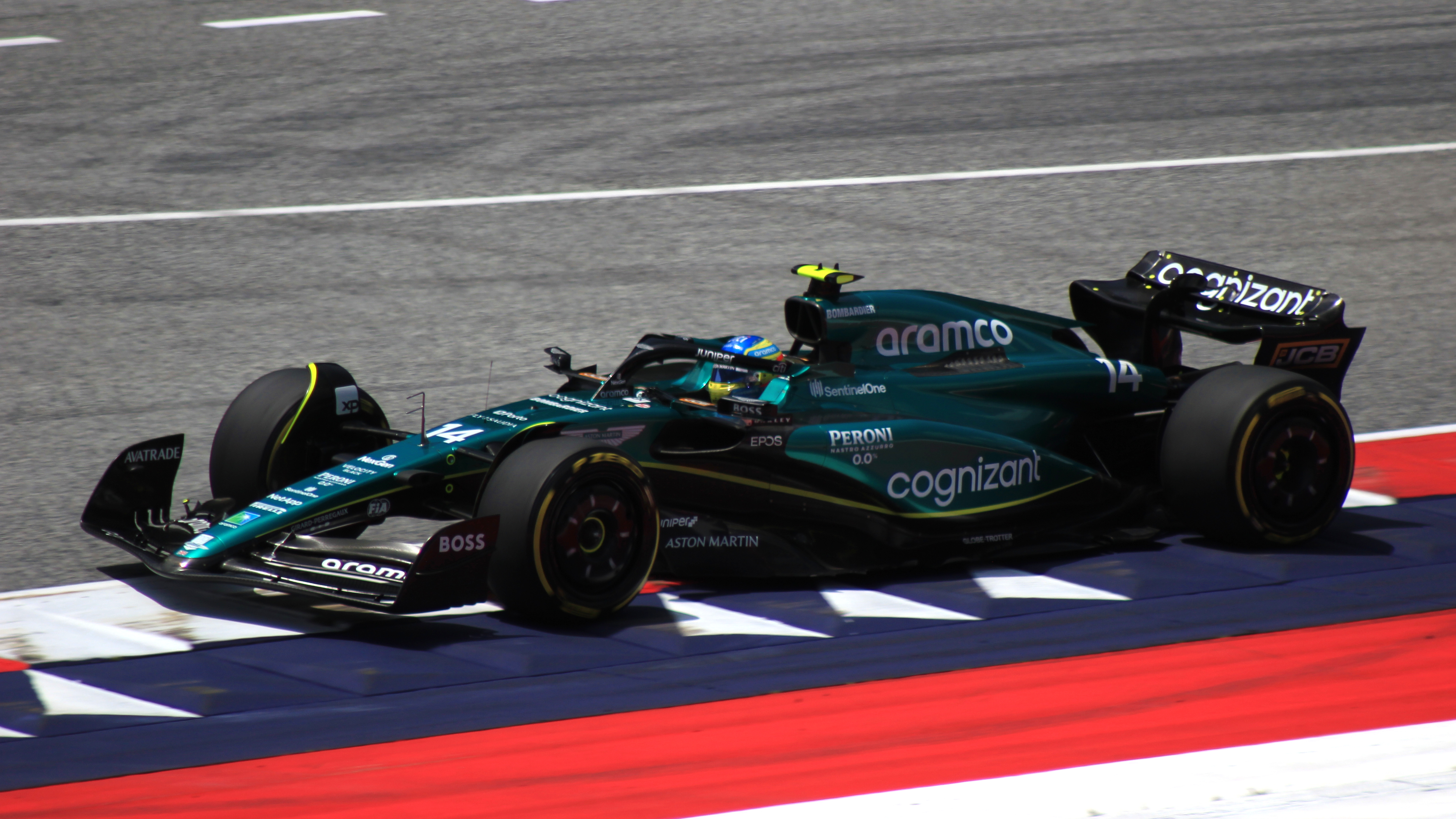
Alonso at the 2023 Austrian Grand Prix, with Aston Martin

Alonso joined Aston Martin on a multi-year deal in 2023 alongside Lance Stroll. He joined the team because he wanted a multi-year contract extension, and Alpine was only willing to give him one more year in F1.

On his Aston Martin debut at the 2023 Bahrain Grand Prix, Alonso, benefitting from the much-improved machinery of the Aston Martin AMR23, recovered from a first-lap contact with his teammate Lance Stroll without any damage and went on to finish in third place, securing a podium finish and Aston's first since Sebastian Vettel's podium at the 2021 Azerbaijan Grand Prix (the German would finish second at the 2021 Hungarian Grand Prix but would be disqualified due to insufficient fuel sample). Despite having to serve a penalty due to his car being off-position at the starting grid, he finished in third again at the following race at the 2023 Saudi Arabian Grand Prix; this marked his 100th podium, making him the sixth driver to have scored one-hundred podiums in his career. Following the race, he was issued another ten-second penalty due to serving the first one improperly at his pit stop, dropping him to fourth behind George Russell; however, the team's appeal was accepted and the second penalty was reversed, keeping his podium.

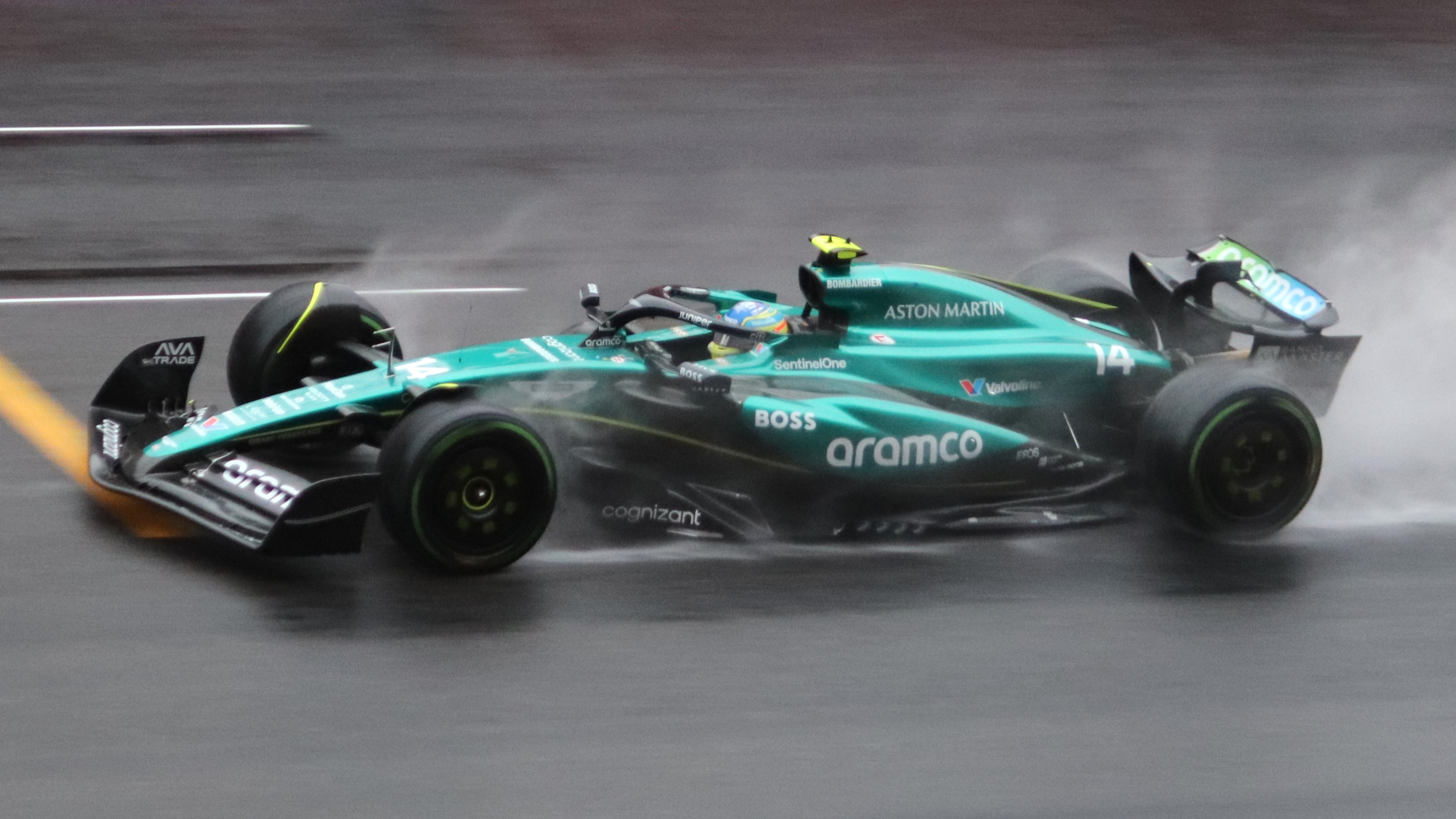
Alonso at the 2024 Chinese Grand Prix, with Aston Martin

Alonso finished in third once again after a chaotic Australian Grand Prix; the third and final restart of the session saw his car make contact with the Ferrari of Carlos Sainz Jr., causing the latter driver to receive a five-second penalty; due to this, Sainz would be classified in last place out of the finishing cars. Alonso's car was undamaged. Alonso agreed with Sainz's criticisms of the penalty, stating that it was "too harsh". The Aston Martins were plagued with DRS issues during qualification of the Azerbaijan Grand Prix, going on to qualify eighth in the new "sprint shootout" qualification and sixth for the main qualification session; he would finish sixth in the sprint race, and fourth in the main race. It was at this point in time the car had dropped in performance, failing to secure podiums on a consistent basis, though he took two podium finishes at Zandvoort, where he recorded his first fastest lap since the 2017 Hungarian Grand Prix, and São Paulo; the latter instance edging out Sergio Pérez by 0.053 seconds. After a seventh-place finish at the Abu Dhabi Grand Prix, Alonso ended the season fourth in the standings, scoring 206 points against his teammate Stroll's 74. Alonso's fourth position in the standings was his highest finish since 2013.

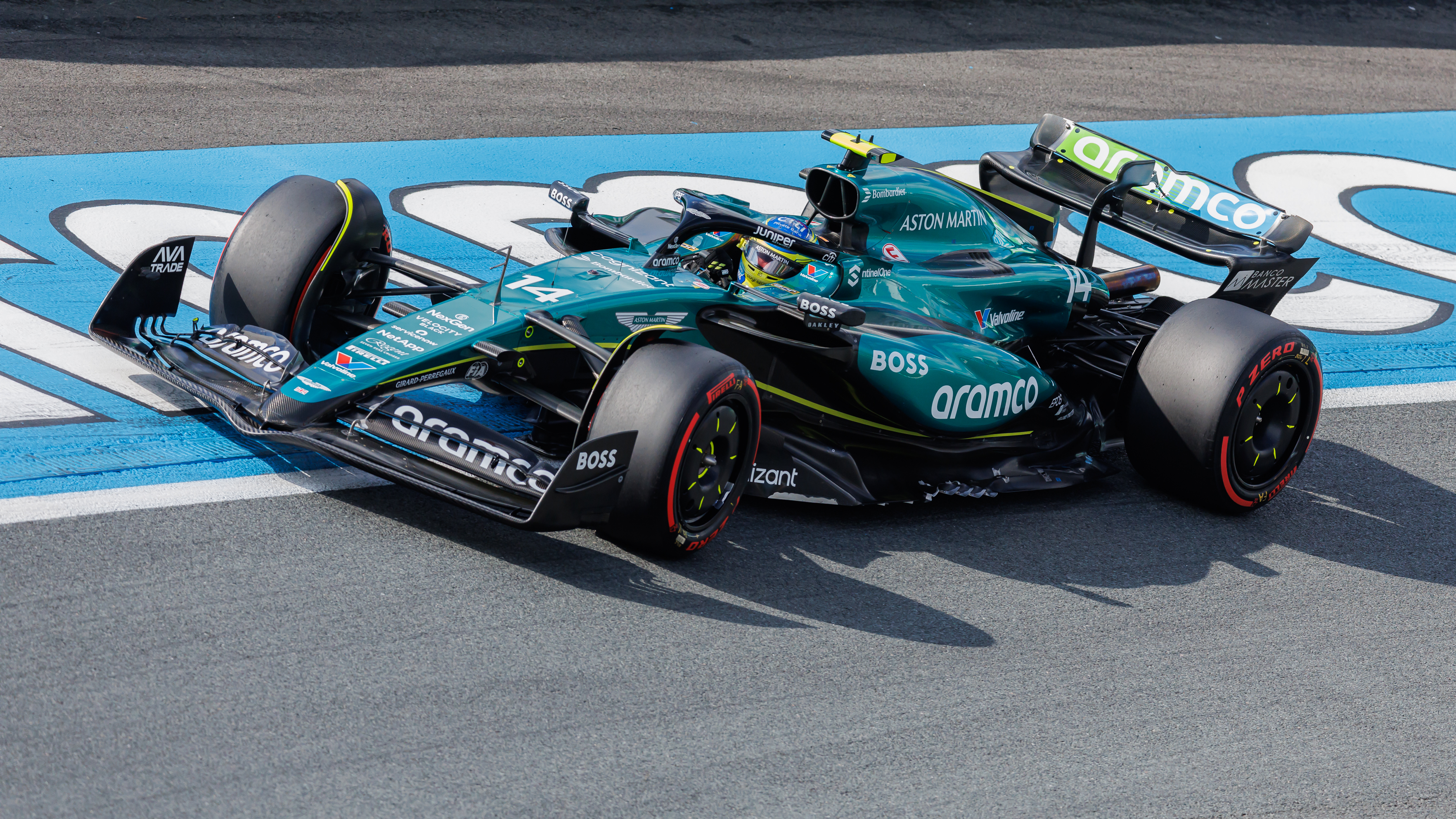
Alonso at the 2024 Dutch Grand Prix

Alonso remained with Aston Martin for the 2024 season. He secured his best finish of the season at the 2024 Saudi Arabian Grand Prix, where he qualified fourth and finished fifth. At the following race in Australia, he was issued a 20-second post-race penalty for potentially dangerous driving while defending against George Russell on the penultimate lap. The stewards ruled that Alonso had lifted and braked unusually early into Turn 6 causing a massive closing speed that caused Russell to lose control and crash. The penalty dropped Alonso to eighth. At the Chinese Grand Prix Alonso retired from the sprint race following a puncture from contact with Carlos Sainz. Stewards again deemed Alonso at fault, handing him a ten-second penalty and three penalty points that brought his total to six within a single month. At the 2024 Mexico City Grand Prix, Alonso competed in his four-hundredth Grand Prix weekend, becoming the first driver to reach this number of races. Alonso finished the season 9th in the standings, scoring 70 points against Stroll's 24.

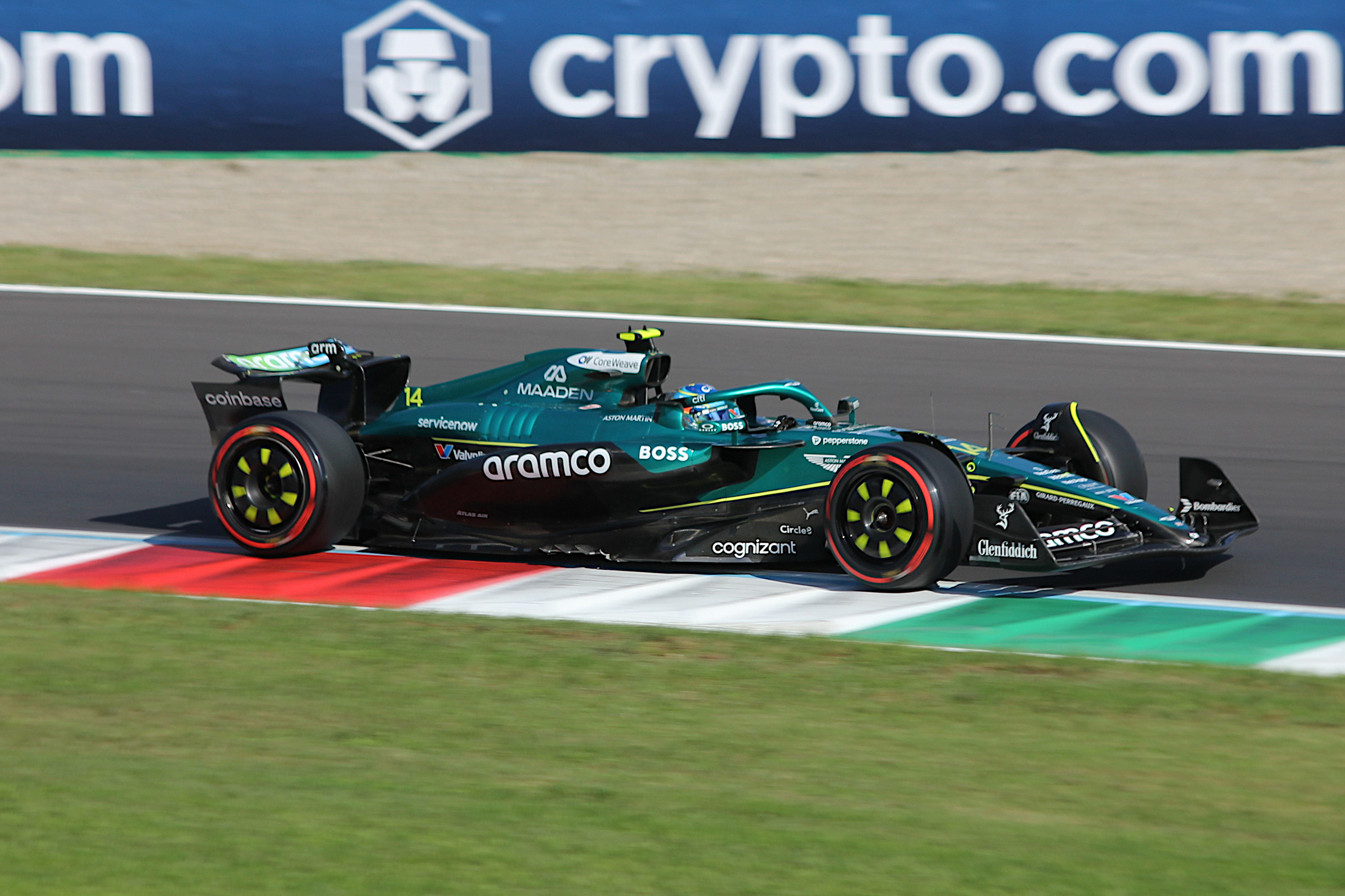
Alonso at the 2025 Italian Grand Prix

On his third season with Aston Martin at the 2025 Australian Grand Prix, Alonso’s campaign began poorly as the AMR25 struggled for pace. Alonso retired after crashing on lap 34 while his teammate Lance Stroll secured a sixth-place finish. This difficult start persisted through the early rounds of the season where the car lacked the performance of its predecessor, leaving Alonso scoreless and sitting 17th in the standings by May. A significant upgrade package introduced at the Emilia Romagna Grand Prix began to turn his season around as Alonso qualified 5th but finished 11th courtesy of a poorly-timed virtual safety car. At the Hungarian Grand Prix, he finished in fifth place, his highest result of the 2025 campaign. This momentum carried into the second half of the season, where he scored in most rounds from Zandvoort to Abu Dhabi. In both Singapore and Qatar Alonso finished in seventh. Despite the car’s early-season deficit Alonso’s pace allowed him to achieve a 24–0 qualifying clean sweep over Stroll, maintaining a gap of nearly four-tenths of a second on average. After a P7 finish at the 2025 Abu Dhabi Grand Prix, Alonso ended the 2025 season 10th in the Drivers' Championship with 56 points compared to Stroll’s 33.

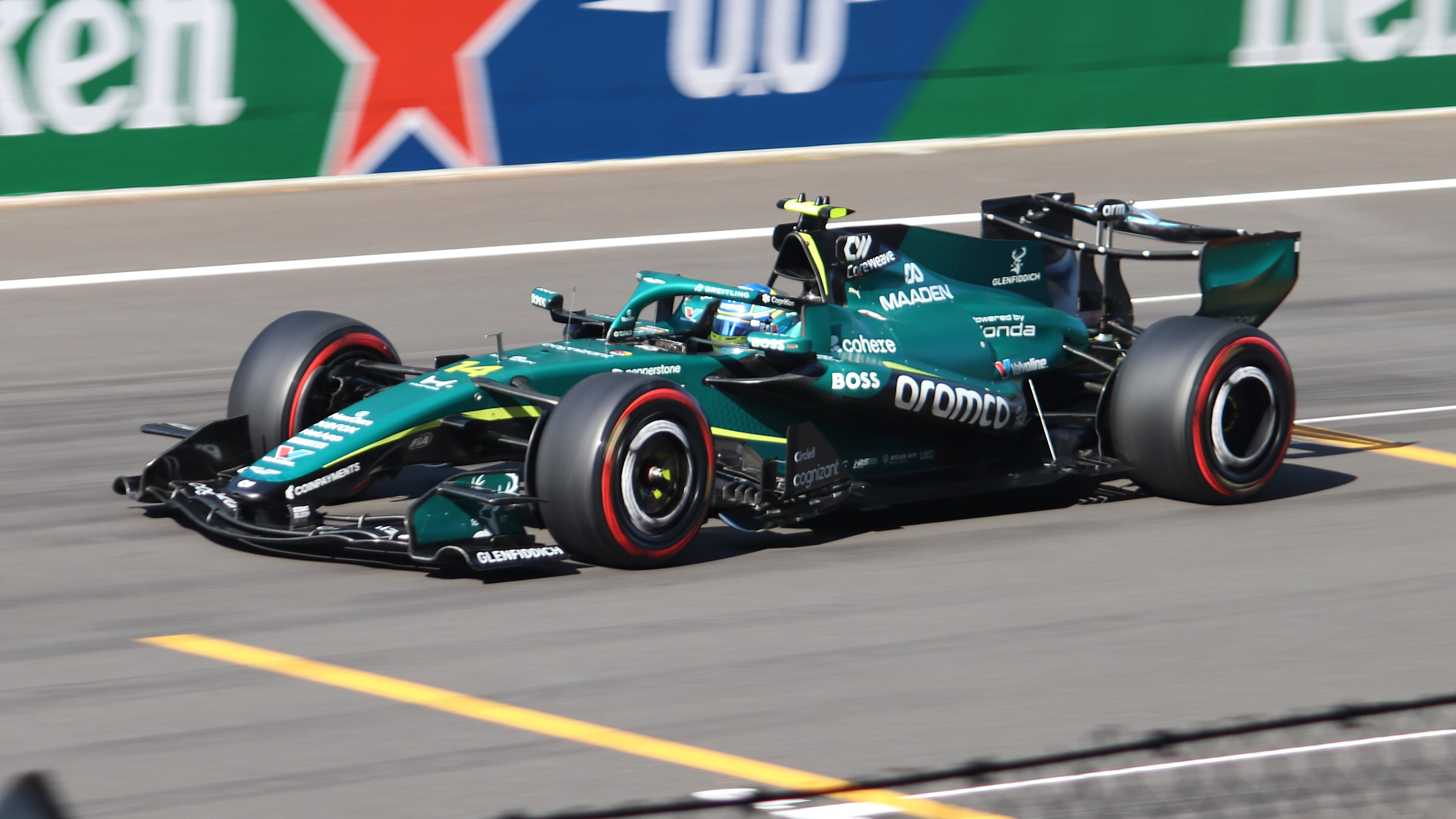
Alonso at the 2026 Chinese Grand Prix

Alonso began his 2026 campaign with two retirements at Australia and China, before placing 18th in Japan, the team's first finish of the season. The AMR26, the first Aston Martin and only car on the grid to be powered by a Honda engine, suffered from reliability issues and lacked pace, causing a very poor start to the season. Alonso was able to score Aston Martin's first points of the season at the 2026 Monaco Grand Prix, after Nico Hülkenberg and Sergio Pérez both received a ten-second penalty, which resulted in Alonso's promotion to tenth place. Alonso scored two further points with a ninth place finish at the 2026 Dutch Grand Prix.

On 29 September, it was announced Alonso had extended his contract with Aston Martin through 2027.

=== Endurance racing ===
Alonso made his sports car endurance racing debut at the 1999 24 Hours of Barcelona. Paired with Antonio García, Salvi Delmuns and the journalist Pedro Fermín Flores, the quartet finished third in the M10 class and tenth overall in a Hyundai Accent. Alonso was due to enter the 2015 24 Hours of Le Mans with Porsche's Le Mans Prototype 1 team before Honda blocked it.

==== WeatherTech SportsCar Championship (2018–2019) ====
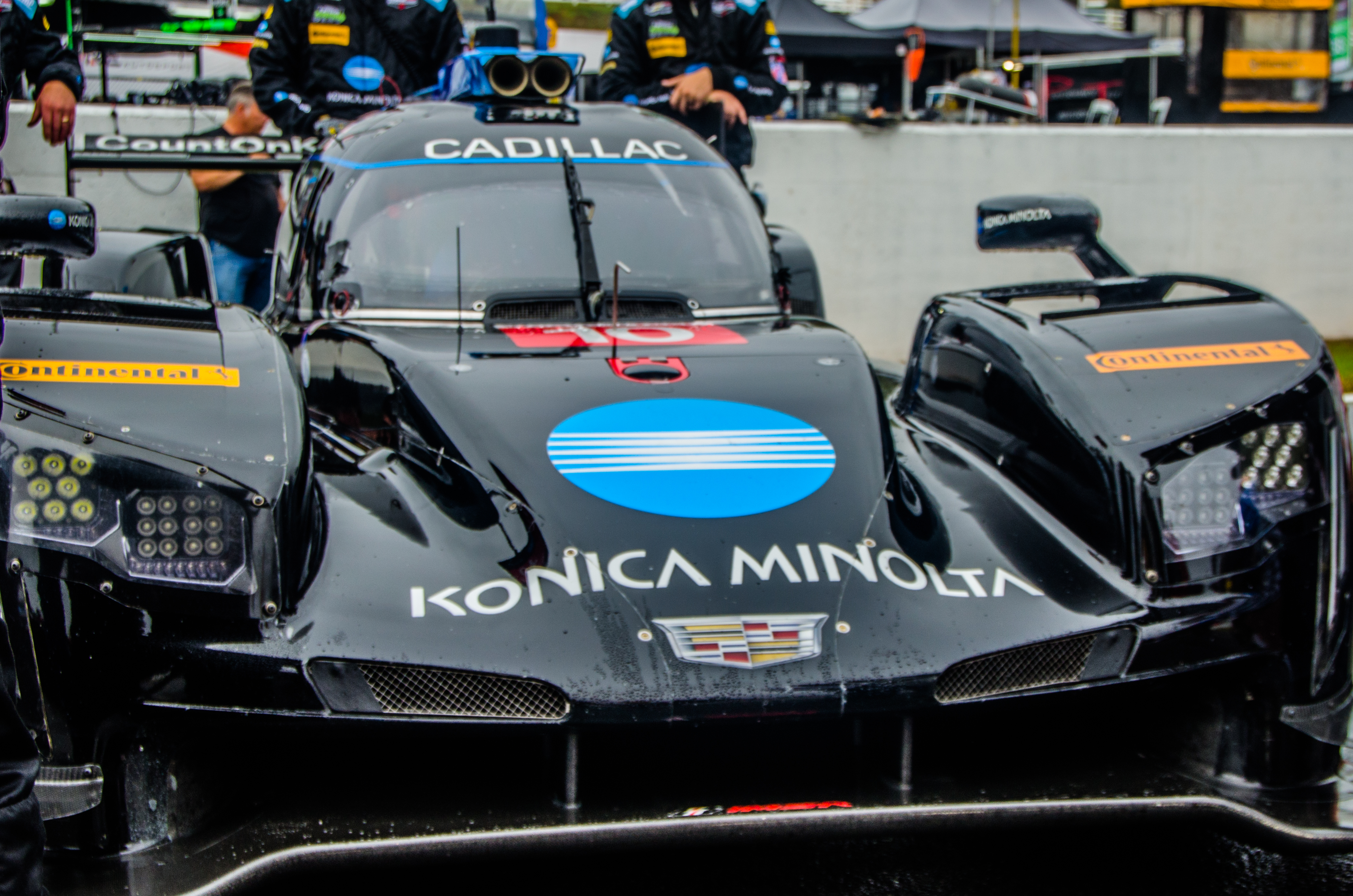
The Wayne Taylor Racing Cadillac DPi-V.R driven in the 2019 24 Hours of Daytona (pictured at the 2017 Petit Le Mans).

Alonso drove a Ligier JS P217 entered by United Autosports in the 2018 24 Hours of Daytona as preparation for the 24 Hours of Le Mans. Alonso, Philip Hanson and McLaren reserve driver Lando Norris qualified thirteenth and finished 38th after multiple mechanical issues affected the car during the race. Alonso returned to race in the 2019 24 Hours of Daytona with Wayne Taylor Racing. He shared a Cadillac DPi-V.R with Kamui Kobayashi, Renger van der Zande and Jordan Taylor. The quartet completed 593 laps to win the rain-shortened event.

==== FIA World Endurance Championship (2018–2019) ====
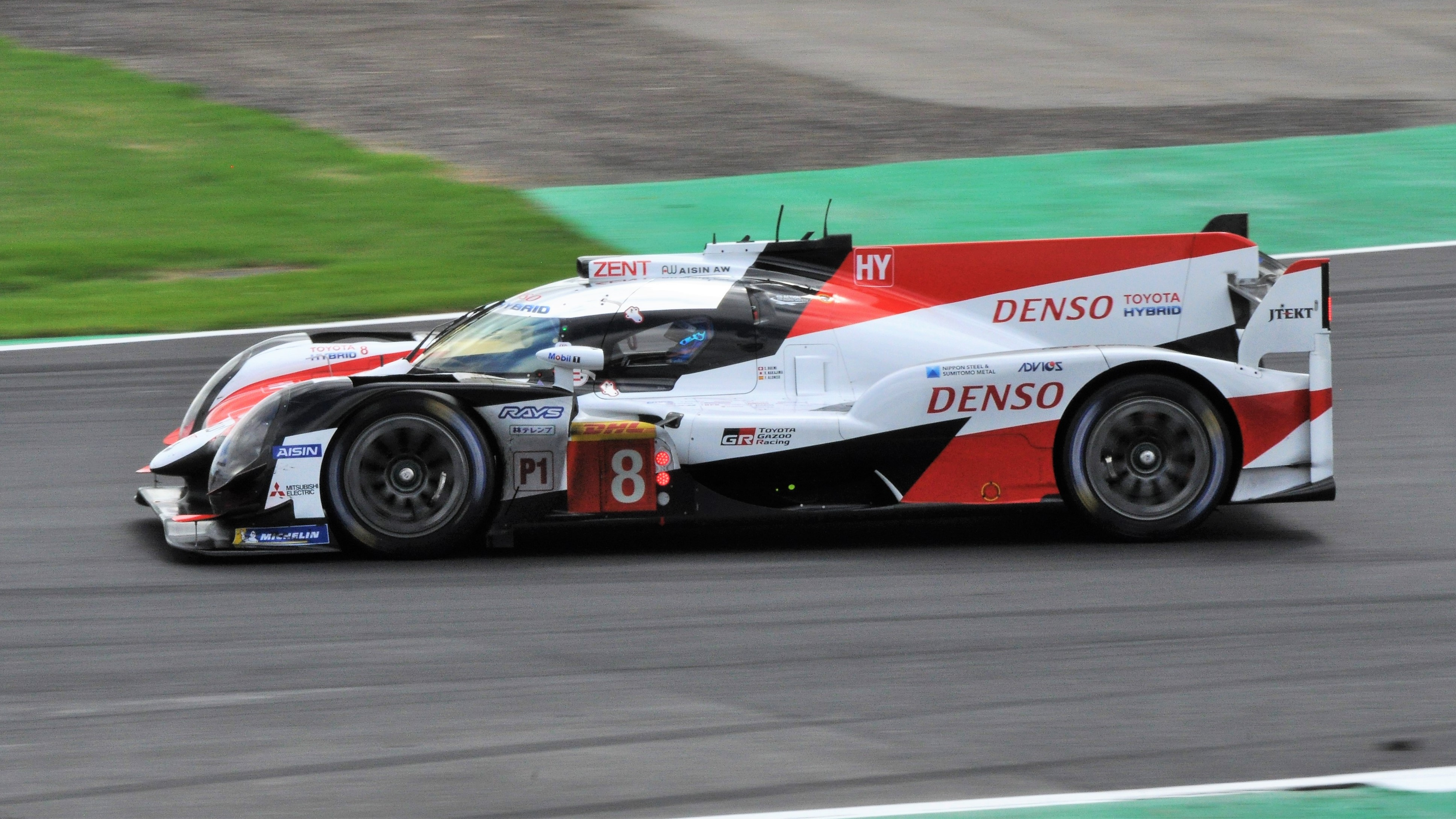
Alonso driving a Toyota TS050 Hybrid at the 2018 6 Hours of Silverstone.

Brown discussed an entry for the 2018 24 Hours of Le Mans with Alonso and was prepared to consent to a switch to another team if certain circumstances were met. Alonso and Toyota held talks and agreed to compete in the 24 Hours of Le Mans. He visited Toyota's factory in Cologne for a seat fitting in a TS050 Hybrid in November 2017. Toyota entered Alonso into a post-season rookie test at the Bahrain International Circuit later that month. In January 2018, McLaren and Toyota reached an agreement to allow Alonso to enter the full 2018–19 FIA World Endurance Championship. (Note: The owners of the Fuji Speedway, which organised the 6 Hours of Fuji, had a request granted for its race to be moved back by a week to allow Alonso to compete in the event and avoid a date clash with the 2018 United States Grand Prix.) He joined Sébastien Buemi and Kazuki Nakajima in Toyota's No. 8 TS050 Hybrid.

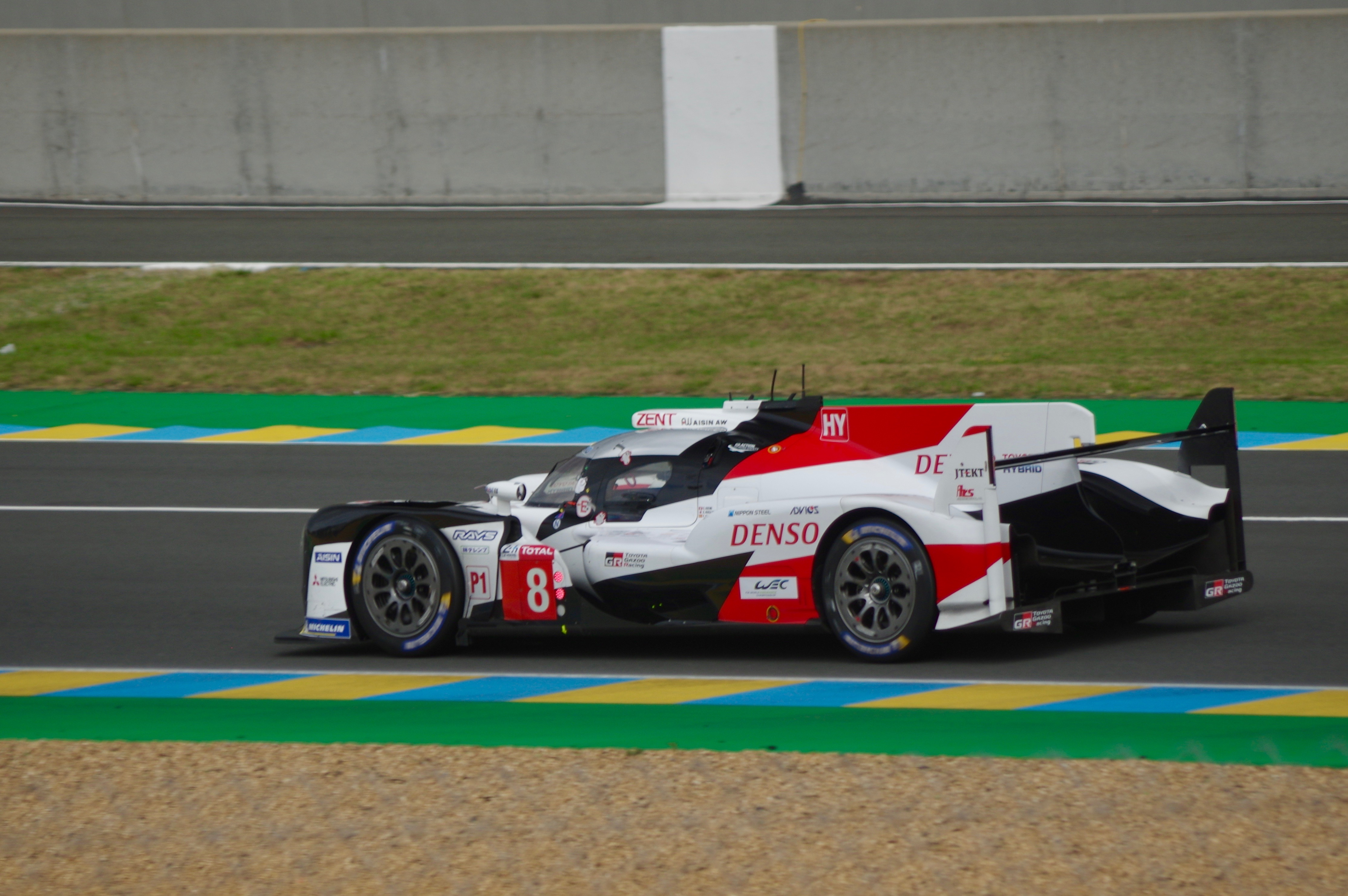
Alonso driving at the 2019 24 Hours of Le Mans

Alonso drove a 2018 TS050 Hybrid in a three-day test session at the Ciudad del Motor de Aragón in February and drove with no artificial lights in a 24-hour kart race as preparation. He, Buemi and Nakajima won the LMP1 Drivers' Championship with five victories including the 2018 24 Hours of Le Mans and the 2019 24 Hours of Le Mans over the eight round season, though this was enhanced by their teammates Mike Conway, Kamui Kobayashi and José María López suffering a sensor issue while leading the 2019 6 Hours of Spa and then suffering a puncture while comfortably leading the 2019 24 Hours of Le Mans with an hour remaining. Alonso left the series at the end of the season.

=== IndyCar Series ===
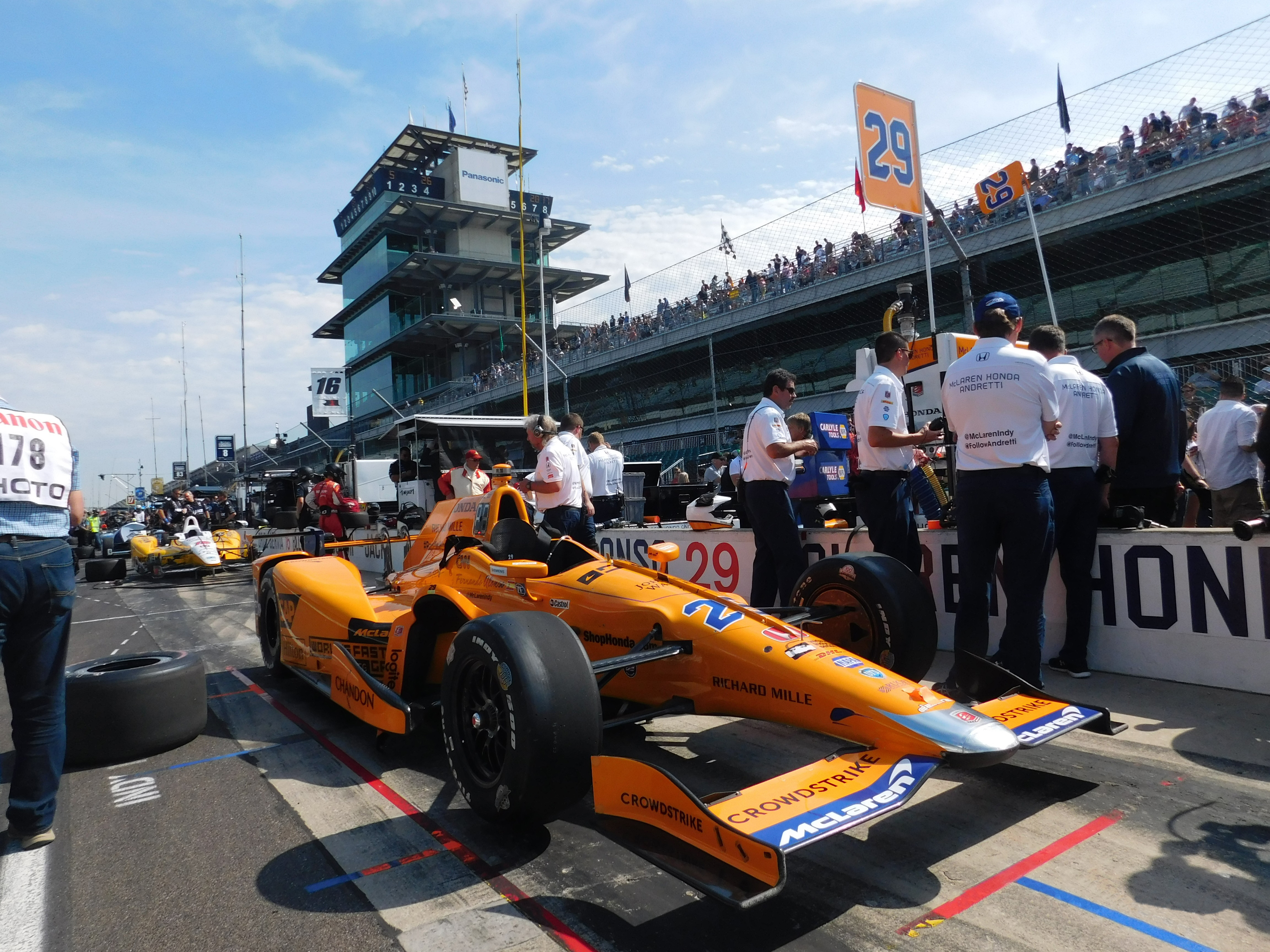
Alonso's car prior to the 2017 Indianapolis 500.

==== McLaren Honda Andretti (2017) ====
Before the 2017 Australian Grand Prix, Zak Brown said to Alonso they should enter the 2017 Indianapolis 500 to which Alonso suggested he was joking. The idea later re-emerged in a conversation in Los Angeles, when Alonso told Brown he was happy with the idea since McLaren had won it before. He and his manager Garcia Abad met Brown and Éric Boullier in China to talk more about the plan and said he would decide the next day. Alonso told Brown he wanted to race at Indianapolis and told him it was "a good decision for everyone: a win, win for myself, for F1, the fans, everyone'." Brown then spoke to the IndyCar Series chief executive officer Mark Miles and discovered that there were no Honda-powered cars. Miles met the Andretti Autosport owner Michael Andretti, who got driver Stefan Wilson to agree to forego his planned entry in partnership with Michael Shank Racing and allow Alonso to drive instead.

Driving the No. 29 McLaren-Honda-Andretti Dallara DW12, Alonso completed a three-stage rookie orientation programme at the Indianapolis Motor Speedway on 3 May. (Note: More than two million watched a livestream of the rookie orientation programme on social media.) Alonso advanced to the Fast Nine shootout in qualifying and set the fifth-fastest four-lap average speed; in the race, he led four times for a total of 27 laps before his engine failed with 21 laps to go. Alonso was classified 24th.

==== McLaren Racing (2019) ====
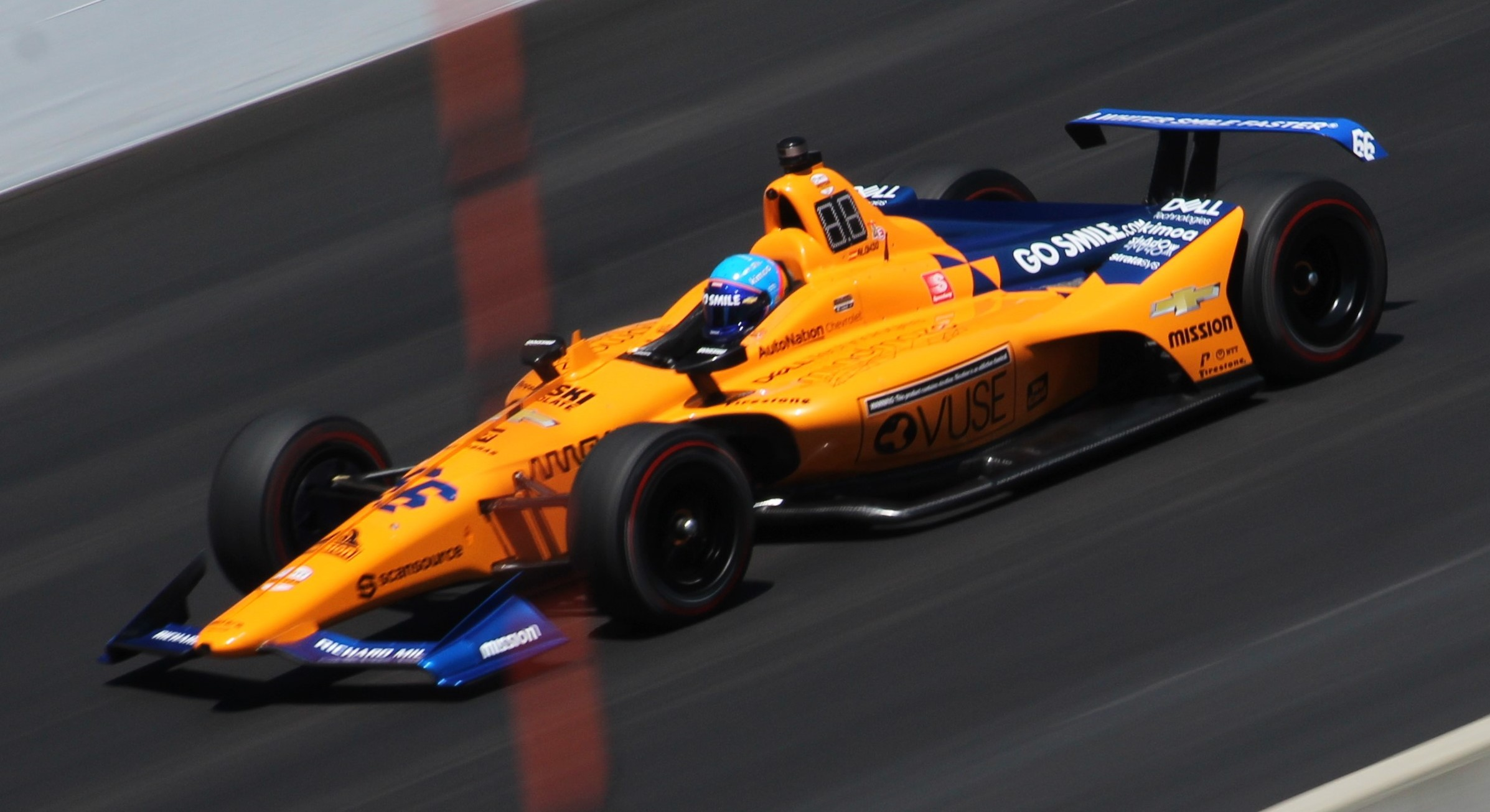
Alonso at the 2019 Indianapolis 500

McLaren began planning an entry for him in the 2019 IndyCar Series in August 2018 and would be supported by the series. Alonso tested a 2018-specification Andretti Autosport-entered Dallara DW12-Honda at the Barber Motorsports Park on 5 September. McLaren opted to enter just the 2019 Indianapolis 500 due to its focus on Formula One and collaborated with Carlin Motorsport in a logistical and technical partnership and signed an engine supply deal with Chevrolet. Alonso ventured to the McLaren Technology Centre in early March 2019 for a seat fitting to become comfortable in the No. 66 Dallara IR18-Chevrolet and its brake pedal was shifted away from his feet since it is used less in IndyCar than in Formula One. Andy Brown was Alonso's race engineer and his chief mechanic was Liam Dance. Alonso did not qualify after Juncos Racing's Kyle Kaiser demoted him to 34th. (Note: McLaren offered to purchase the Arrow Schmidt Peterson car of Oriol Servià to allow Alonso to enter the race and meet sponsorship obligations since the two teams were in a partnership. Alonso was against replacing a driver who had qualified and McLaren opted against doing so.) Reasons included a dismantled spare car needed to assembled and flown from Carlin's factory after Alonso crashed in practice. An error converting from the American imperial system to the British metric system caused his car to scrape along the tarmac surface and incorrect gear ratios slowed him.

==== Arrow McLaren SP (2020) ====
Alonso entered the 2020 Indianapolis 500 with Arrow McLaren SP after an agreement with Andretti Autosports fell through. He had a crash during practice and qualified 26th. He did manage to finish the race. He started 26th, was running fifteenth halfway through the race, and then ended up 21st and one lap down because of a clutch issue causing the team to manually start the car during every pit stop.

=== Off-road racing ===
Alonso entered the Dakar Rally with Toyota in 2020 following a five-month testing programme in Africa, Europe and the Middle East and driving a series of races to better himself. He raced in the Lichtenburg 400 in South Africa, the Rally du Maroc in Morocco and the Al Ula–Neom Rally in Saudi Arabia, with the five-time Dakar Rally bike class winner Marc Coma his co-driver. Alonso was third at the Al Ula-Neom Rally, which was his highest finish in three preparation events. With co-driver Coma, he finished the Dakar in thirteenth position with a best stage finish of second place. A stop for repairs on the second stage and a roll on the tenth lost him several hours in the general classification.

Alonso is scheduled to take part in the 2027 Dakar Rally with Aston Martin Racing.

== Driving style ==
The essence of his qualities is that he is very complete. You struggle to find a weak point, basically, in terms of high-level skills. The technical preparation in terms of driving. The ability to cope with a variety of situations. Intelligence – just [the] capacity to understand the situation while he is in or out of the car. Commitment... it is so difficult for Fernando to accept he is slower than someone else. It is very essential to his nature[,] which potentially might have created problems when he was not mature enough to manage this fundamental aspect of his identity... I have seen this with Michael [Schumacher]... This aspect of Fernando is certainly not less than Michael, but it expresses itself in different ways.

— Alonso's race engineer at Ferrari, Andrea Stella, on Alonso's ability and similarities to Michael Schumacher

Alonso is often regarded as one of the greatest F1 drivers in the history of the sport. Journalists and fellow drivers regarded Alonso as a fast and consistent driver who can extract additional pace from a car in all weathers and on all tracks. Fisichella said Alonso understands when to go faster and when to preserve his tyres in a race. Former racing driver and Sky Sports pundit Martin Brundle described Alonso as "Senna-like in his intimate feel for where the grip is" and cited the driver's knowledge on how much grip to use for the entry to a turn. He drives aggressively and uses a braking area to put a car into a corner without losing speed exiting it. This allows Alonso to keep it "on the edge of adhesion" and it has been observed during a qualifying session and the first laps of a race. 1979 world champion Jody Scheckter has criticised Alonso for causing problems in teams. This opinion is shared by Christian Horner, who ruled out signing Alonso for Red Bull, as he caused chaos in previous teams.

Alonso's experience increased his awareness of events around him and competitors in a race and adjusted his situation to focus on the drivers' championship. Alonso is an all-round driver who can mount an apex and correct a sliding car to go faster. He is careful in finding the ideal feeling with his brakes and can apply the maximum amount of force with a fast response time. Alonso's physical strength contrasts his braking skill and regularly exceeded that limit without overdoing it on multiple conditions. According to Jonathan Noble of Motorsport.com, this allows Alonso to "create a kind of natural ABS – fully exploiting tyre grip to achieve greater speeds while turning without locking the wheels."

== Helmet and career number ==
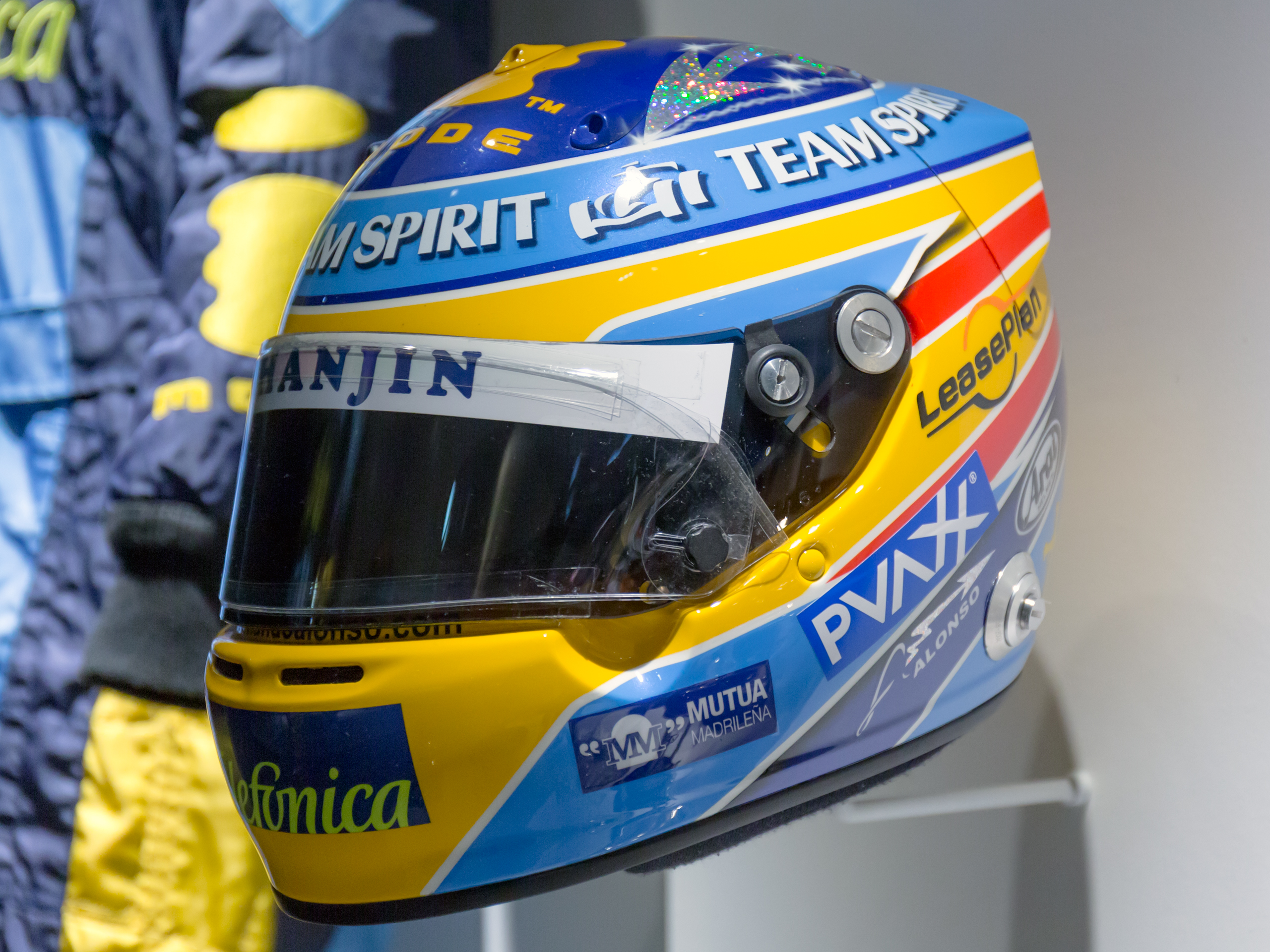
Alonso's Arai helmet used during the 2006 Formula One World Championship

Alonso's helmet manufactured by Bieffe (2001), Arai (2003–2009, 2016), Schuberth (2010–2015) Bell (2017–) sports the yellow and red colours of the flag of Spain with shades of blue from the Asturias flag and coupled with two silver thunderbolt arrows derived from a remote control car he received as a present in his childhood on top and a yellow Asturian cross (sometimes on the back, other times on the side). He changed its mainbase colour design when switching teams during his F1 career; in 2008 Alonso attached two pictures of a spade, ace and heart symbol to show he was a two-time world champion.

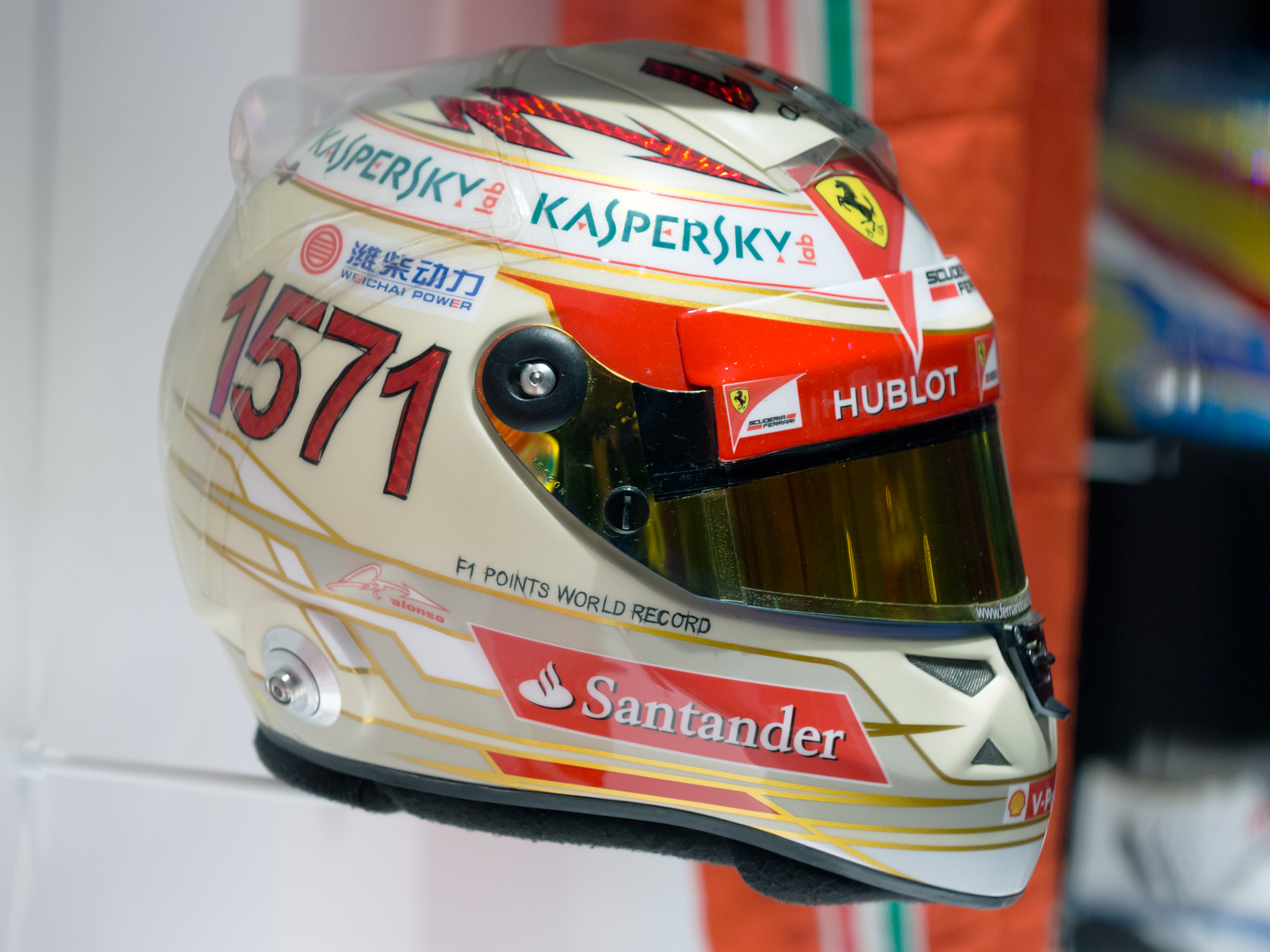
The racing helmet Alonso wore at the 2013 Indian Grand Prix to commemorate him scoring 1571 career points

For three successive Monaco Grand Prix from 2011 to 2013 and at the 2011 Singapore Grand Prix, he wore a gold and white coloured helmet to replace the blue and yellow. At the following 2013 Indian Grand Prix, Alonso sported a white helmet to celebrate his total number of career points scored up to the preceding Japanese Grand Prix of 1571 and with the words "F1 points World Record" accompanied with a thank you message in English, French and Italian.

Alonso's final event for Ferrari at the 2014 Abu Dhabi Grand Prix saw him wear a helmet with a picture depicting a pit stop in that year in the colour red, signature of various team members and the flag of Italy in the centre. At the 2017 Indianapolis 500 and the 2017 United States Grand Prix, Alonso sported a black helmet with red, yellow and blue stripes around it and his race number. He revised the livery for the 2018 24 Hours of Daytona to white instead of black and had no stripes around the front. The back had the layout of the Daytona International Speedway and continued to have his usual blue, red and yellow colours.

In 2018, Alonso changed its front livery to be predominantly blue with the back top lighter blue and the rear red and yellow. His helmet for the 2018 Abu Dhabi Grand Prix was divided equally between the flag of Spain on the right with a blue-checkered pattern around its side. The yellow on that area was replaced by gold between two horizontal stripes in red and a thick vertical strip was added with a list of Alonso's 32 F1 race victories.

For the 2014 season, the FIA created a new regulation allowing drivers to select specific car numbers for use throughout their F1 career. Alonso requested the number 14 for it has been his lucky number since his world karting championship victory in a kart with number 14, at the age of 14, on 14 July 1996.

== Driver management ==
Alonso operates a driver management company, A14 Management. A14 Management manages a portfolio of young drivers across several motorsport disciplines. As of 2025, this included Maximilian Günther, Clément Novalak, Nikola Tsolov, Gabriel Bortoleto, Pepe Martí, Sebastián Montoya, Chloe Chambers, Cenyu Han, Andrés Cárdenas, and Carl Bennett.

== Image and impact ==
Nate Saunders of ESPN writes that Alonso "is one of the most eloquent speakers in F1 and one of the best at interacting with the media". He occasionally uses press conferences with the press to cultivate particular narratives of a story, convey himself as controlling the F1 driver market or as the one with knowledge of facts of a situation. Alonso dislikes fame and prefers a private life, with Chris Jenkins of USA Today describing him as shy. He has been noted for refraining from expensive habits and possessions.

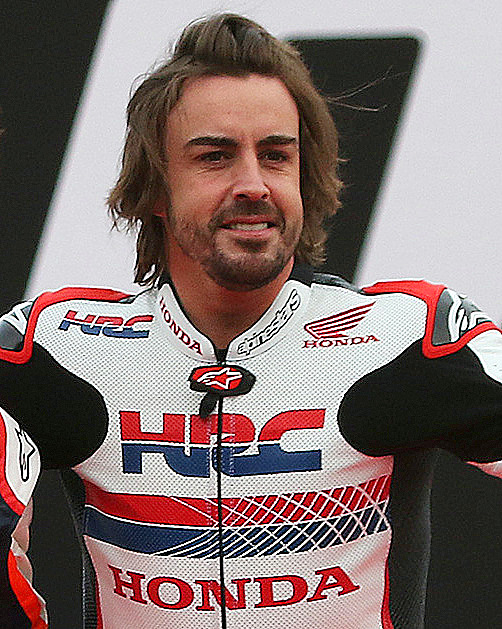
Alonso at the 2015 Honda Racing Thanks Day

Alonso's public persona has been noted as being different from his private personality. Fellow Spanish driver Carlos Sainz Jr. claimed "there are two Fernandos", alluding to Alonso's defensive nature when criticised because of his shyness, compared to his sense of humour, generosity and kind-nature when not racing. According to the Autosport journalist Ben Anderson, Alonso's success in F1 required him to behave egotistically and selfishly and to have a self-confidence, in order to cope with the consequences of "burst[ing] egotistical bubbles" to improve himself. Alonso acknowledged the façade and told Anderson "I know who I am outside of F1, but that remains a question mark for everybody because I like to separate my personal life from my professional life" and his different personality traits in public and private. Alonso made a voice cameo appearance as an anthropomorphic version of himself in the Spanish dub of Cars 2 (2011), and a voice command assistant in the Spanish dub of Cars 3 (2017).

Journalist Nigel Roebuck calls Alonso "the first world-class racing driver to come out of Spain", and is credited for popularising F1 in the country, where it was once considered a fringe sport and a lesser known form of motorsport than motorcycling and rallying. He was Personality Media's favourite male athlete with a 99 per cent recognition rating amongst the Spanish public in 2015; in the latter part of his F1 career, Alonso was within the top two most popular drivers in the Grand Prix Drivers' Association fan surveys of 2010, 2015 and 2017.

The Fernando Alonso Sports Complex in Oviedo was opened in June 2015 and features a CIK-FIA compliant karting track featuring 29 layouts. A museum dedicated to his racing career, the 'Museo y Circuito Fernando Alonso', opened in the same year, featuring Alonso's race cars, helmets, overalls, and memorabilia.

=== Endorsements and philanthropy ===
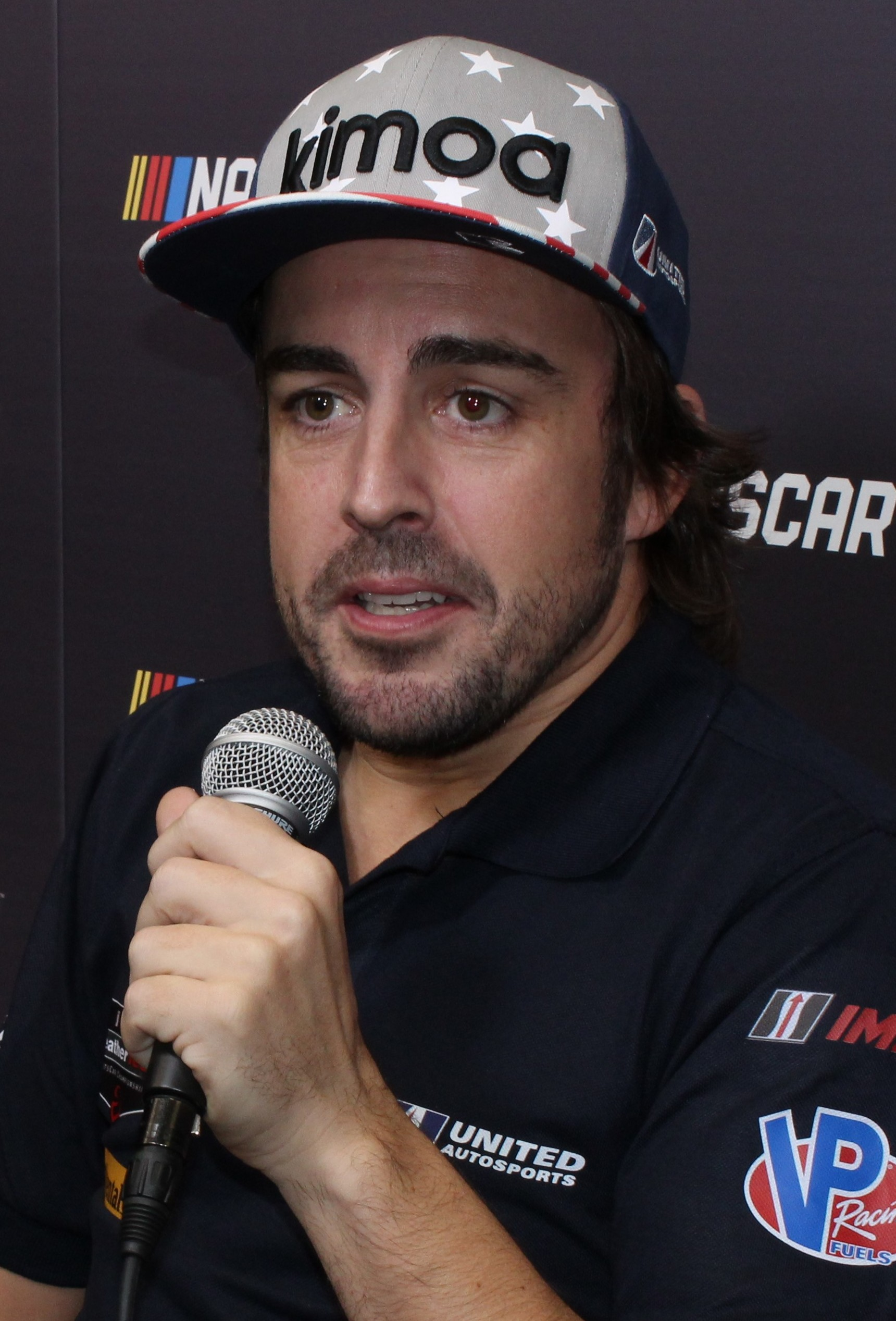
Alonso wearing a Kimoa hat at a NASCAR media tour in 2018

Alonso has done business with Banco Santander, Cajastur, TAG Heuer, Europcar, Silestone, Liberbank, ING, Chandon, Adidas, and Bang & Olufsen. He is the founder and brand ambassador of the fashion retailer Kimoa, and intended to establish the Fernando Alonso Cycling Team to compete in UCI events in 2015 before the project failed to materialise. (Note: The leaked Paradise Papers stated Alonso's manager Luis García Abad founded and constituted the Revolution Holdings Limited for the team on the Mediterranean island of Malta. Documents released to the Spanish media revealed the Directorate-General for the Treasury knew about its existence and accounts.) As a result of Alonso's endorsement money and F1 salary, he has been listed as one of the world's highest-paid athletes by Forbes every year from 2012 to 2018. The magazine named him motorsport's top-earning driver from June 2012 to June 2013, one of 2016's top earning international stars, and one of 2017's highest-paid international and European celebrities. Alonso also featured on the Forbes Celebrity 100 list in 2008 and 2017. In 2020, Alonso was sponsored by Ruoff Mortgage for his Indianapolis 500 attempt. In 2025, Alonso became brand ambassador for Flexicar, a Spanish used-vehicle retailer, as part of the company's corporate rebranding.

Alonso was appointed director of the Grand Prix Drivers' Association (GPDA) along with Mark Webber and Ralf Schumacher. He held that post from 2006 to 2010.

In November 2017, Alonso established the FA Racing G2 Logitech G eSports racing team of which he is the team principal and competes in virtual online racing championships on multiple platforms. The team dissolved in 2018 and launched another in partnership with FA Racing and Veloce Esports in March 2019. Alonso's team has also competed in the F4 Spanish Championship, Formula Renault Eurocup and karting. He is an investor and board member of the eSports multi-racing platform Motorsport Games.

The UNICEF Spanish Committee named Alonso a UNICEF Goodwill Ambassador in February 2005 to promote and defend children's rights and awareness of UNICEF. Alonso promoted India's efforts to eradicate polio in 2011 and handwashing with soap to school children in 2012, whilst he also supported UNICEF's anti-cyberbullying campaign in November 2017. Alonso founded the Fundación Fernando Alonso (transl. Fernando Alonso Foundation) in 2007 to promote motor racing and road safety education.

=== Awards and honours ===
Alonso received the 2003 Autosport Gregor Grant Award for winning the 2003 Hungarian Grand Prix. He also won the Princess Cristina National Sports Award for sporting newcomer in that year. Alonso was named the Lorenzo Bandini Trophy's recipient in April 2005. From October 2005 to May 2006, he received the Prince of Asturias Award for Sports, the Premios Nacionales del Deporte Sportsman of the Year Award and the Gold Medal of the Royal Order of Sports Merit for winning the 2005 F1 World Championship.

Alonso was named the 2006 Autosport International Racing Driver of the Year. Alonso was voted the Indianapolis 500 Rookie of the Year for his performance in the 2017 Indianapolis 500. He was inducted into the FIA Hall of Fame in 2017 for being a F1 World Champion and again as a FIA World Endurance Champion in 2019. This made Alonso the first driver to have been inducted into the FIA Hall of Fame twice.

== Personal life ==
From November 2006 to December 2011, Alonso was married to Raquel del Rosario, the lead singer of the Spanish pop band El Sueño de Morfeo. He was engaged to Spanish television presenter Lara Álvarez from 2015 to 2016. Alonso dated Italian model Linda Morselli from 2016 to 2021. His partner, journalist Melissa Jiménez, gave birth to his first child in March 2026.

Alonso supports the Real Madrid and Real Oviedo football teams, and is a cycling enthusiast. He is 171 cm (5 ft 7 in) tall. In addition to his native Spanish, Alonso speaks English, French, and Italian. His personal garage includes such cars as the McLaren P1, Ferrari 458 Italia, Nissan GT-R, and Honda NSX.

Alonso has been trained by Fabrizio Borra and Edoardo Bendinelli during his career.

== Karting record ==
=== Karting career summary ===
Season	Series	Position
1991	Spanish Championship — Cadet	2nd
1993	Spanish Championship — Junior	1st
1994	Torneo delle Industrie — 100 Junior	28th
1994	Spanish Championship — Junior	1st
1995	Andrea Margutti Trophy — 100 Junior	19th
1995	Rainbow Trophy — Cadets	3rd
1995	Spanish Championship — Junior	1st
1996	Torneo delle Industrie — 100 Nazionale	28th
1996	Five Continents Cup — Junior A	1st
1996	Andrea Margutti Trophy — 100 Junior	15th
1997	Andrea Margutti Trophy — ICA	4th
1998	Andrea Margutti Trophy — Formula A	7th
1998	European Championship — Formula A	2nd
1998	World Championship — Formula A	26th
1999	Andrea Margutti Trophy — Formula A	5th
1999	European Championship — Formula Super A	18th
1999	World Championship — Formula Super A	19th

== Racing record ==
=== Racing career summary ===
Season	Series	Team	Races	Wins	Poles	FLaps	Podiums	Points	Position
1999	Euro Open by Nissan	Campos Motorsport	15	6	6	5	8	164	**1st**
2000	International Formula 3000	Team Astromega	9	1	1	2	2	17	4th
2000	Formula One	European Minardi F1	Reserve driver						
2001	Formula One	European Minardi F1	17	0	0	0	0	0	23rd
2002	Formula One	Mild Seven Renault F1 Team	Test driver						
2003	Formula One	Mild Seven Renault F1 Team	16	1	2	1	4	55	6th
2004	Formula One	Mild Seven Renault F1 Team	18	0	1	0	4	59	4th
2005	Formula One	Mild Seven Renault F1 Team	19	7	6	2	15	133	**1st**
2006	Formula One	Mild Seven Renault F1 Team	18	7	6	5	14	134	**1st**
2007	Formula One	Vodafone McLaren Mercedes	17	4	2	3	12	109	**3rd**
2008	Formula One	ING Renault F1 Team	18	2	0	0	3	61	5th
2009	Formula One	ING Renault F1 Team	17	0	1	2	1	26	9th
2010	Formula One	Scuderia Ferrari Marlboro	19	5	2	5	10	252	**2nd**
2011	Formula One	Scuderia Ferrari	19	1	0	1	10	257	4th
2012	Formula One	Scuderia Ferrari	20	3	2	0	13	278	**2nd**
2013	Formula One	Scuderia Ferrari	19	2	0	2	9	242	**2nd**
2014	Formula One	Scuderia Ferrari	19	0	0	0	2	161	6th
2015	Formula One	McLaren Honda	18	0	0	0	0	11	17th
2016	Formula One	McLaren Honda	20	0	0	1	0	54	10th
2017	Formula One	McLaren Honda	19	0	0	1	0	17	15th
2017	IndyCar Series	McLaren-Honda-Andretti	1	0	0	0	0	47	29th
2018	Formula One	McLaren F1 Team	21	0	0	0	0	50	11th
2018	24 Hours of Le Mans	Toyota Gazoo Racing	1	1	1	0	1	N/A	**1st**
2018	IMSA SportsCar Championship	United Autosports	1	0	0	0	0	18	58th
2018–19	FIA World Endurance Championship	Toyota Gazoo Racing	8	5	4	0	7	198	**1st**
2019	IMSA SportsCar Championship	Konica Minolta Cadillac	1	1	0	0	1	35	27th
2019	24 Hours of Le Mans	Toyota Gazoo Racing	1	1	0	0	1	N/A	**1st**
2019	IndyCar Series	McLaren Racing	0	0	0	0	0	0	NC
2019	Formula One	McLaren F1 Team	Test driver						
2020	Dakar Rally	Toyota Gazoo Racing	1	0	N/A		0	N/A	13th
2020	IndyCar Series	Arrow McLaren SP	1	0	0	0	0	18	31st
2020	Formula One	Renault F1 Team	Test driver						
2021	Formula One	Alpine F1 Team	22	0	0	0	1	81	10th
2022	Formula One	BWT Alpine F1 Team	22	0	0	0	0	81	9th
2023	Formula One	Aston Martin Aramco Cognizant F1 Team	22	0	0	1	8	206	4th
2024	Formula One	Aston Martin Aramco F1 Team	24	0	0	2	0	70	9th
2025	Formula One	Aston Martin Aramco F1 Team	24	0	0	0	0	56	10th
2026	Formula One	Aston Martin Aramco F1 Team	20	0	0	0	0	7*	17th*
2027	Dakar Rally	Aston Martin Racing							

* Season still in progress.

=== Complete Euro Open by Nissan results ===
(key) (Races in bold indicate pole position; races in italics indicate fastest lap)

Year	Entrant	1	2	3	4	5	6	7	8	9	10	11	12	13	14	15	16	DC	Points
1999	Campos Motorsport	ALB; 1 Ret	ALB; 2; 1	JER; 1 Ret	JER; 2 DNS	**JAR**; **1** Ret	**JAR**; **2**; 1	**MNZ**; **1** Ret	MNZ; 2 Ret	**JAR**; **1**; 2	JAR; 2 Ret	**DON**; **1**; 1	**DON**; **2**; 1	CAT; 1; 7	CAT; 2; 1	VAL; 1; 2	VAL; 2; 1	1st	164

=== Complete International Formula 3000 results ===
(key) (Races in bold indicate pole position; races in italics indicate fastest lap)

Year	Entrant	1	2	3	4	5	6	7	8	9	10	DC	Points
2000	Team Astromega	IMO; 9	SIL; EX	CAT; 15	NÜR; Ret	MON; 8	MAG; Ret	A1R; 6	HOC; Ret	HUN; 2	**SPA**; 1	4th	17

=== Complete Formula One results ===
(key) (Races in bold indicate pole position; races in italics indicate fastest lap; small number indicates the finishing position)

Year	Entrant	Chassis	Engine	1	2	3	4	5	6	7	8	9	10	11	12	13	14	15	16	17	18	19	20	21	22	23	24	WDC	Points
2001	European Minardi F1	Minardi PS01	European (Cosworth) 3.0 V10	AUS; 12	MAL; 13	BRA; Ret	SMR; Ret	ESP; 13	AUT; Ret	MON; Ret	CAN; Ret	EUR; 14	FRA; 17^{†}	GBR; 16	GER; 10	HUN; Ret												23rd	0
2001	European Minardi F1	Minardi PS01B	European (Cosworth) 3.0 V10														BEL; DNS	ITA; 13	USA; Ret	JPN; 11								23rd	0
2003	Mild Seven Renault F1 Team	Renault R23	Renault RS23 3.0 V10	AUS; 7	**MAL**; 3	BRA; 3	SMR; 6	ESP; 2	AUT; Ret	MON; 5	CAN; 4	EUR; 4	FRA; Ret															6th	55
2003	Mild Seven Renault F1 Team	Renault R23B	Renault RS23 3.0 V10											GBR; Ret	GER; 4	**HUN**; 1	ITA; 8	USA; Ret	JPN; Ret									6th	55
2004	Mild Seven Renault F1 Team	Renault R24	Renault RS24 3.0 V10	AUS; 3	MAL; 7	BHR; 6	SMR; 4	ESP; 4	MON; Ret	EUR; 5	CAN; Ret	USA; Ret	**FRA**; 2	GBR; 10	GER; 3	HUN; 3	BEL; Ret	ITA; Ret	CHN; 4	JPN; 5	BRA; 4							4th	59
2005	Mild Seven Renault F1 Team	Renault R25	Renault RS25 3.0 V10	AUS; 3	**MAL**; 1	**BHR**; 1	SMR; 1	ESP; 2	MON; 4	EUR; 1	CAN; Ret	USA; DNS	**FRA**; 1	**GBR**; 2	GER; 1	HUN; 11	TUR; 2	ITA; 2	BEL; 2	**BRA**; 3	JPN; 3	**CHN**; 1						**1st**	**133**
2006	Mild Seven Renault F1 Team	Renault R26	Renault RS26 2.4 V8	BHR; 1	MAL; 2	AUS; 1	SMR; 2	**EUR**; 2	**ESP**; 1	**MON**; 1	**GBR**; 1	**CAN**; 1	USA; 5	FRA; 2	GER; 5	HUN; Ret	TUR; 2	ITA; Ret	**CHN**; 2	JPN; 1	BRA; 2							**1st**	**134**
2007	Vodafone McLaren Mercedes	McLaren MP4-22	Mercedes FO 108T 2.4 V8	AUS; 2	MAL; 1	BHR; 5	ESP; 3	**MON**; 1	CAN; 7	USA; 2	FRA; 7	GBR; 2	EUR; 1	HUN; 4	TUR; 3	**ITA**; 1	BEL; 3	JPN; Ret	CHN; 2	BRA; 3								**3rd**	**109**
2008	ING Renault F1 Team	Renault R28	Renault RS27 2.4 V8	AUS; 4	MAL; 8	BHR; 10	ESP; Ret	TUR; 6	MON; 10	CAN; Ret	FRA; 8	GBR; 6	GER; 11	HUN; 4	EUR; Ret	BEL; 4	ITA; 4	SIN; 1	JPN; 1	CHN; 4	BRA; 2							5th	61
2009	ING Renault F1 Team	Renault R29	Renault RS27 2.4 V8	AUS; 5	MAL; 11	CHN; 9	BHR; 8	ESP; 5	MON; 7	TUR; 10	GBR; 14	GER; 7	**HUN**; Ret	EUR; 6	BEL; Ret	ITA; 5												9th	26
2009	Renault F1 Team	Renault R29	Renault RS27 2.4 V8														SIN; 3	JPN; 10	BRA; Ret	ABU; 14								9th	26
2010	Scuderia Ferrari Marlboro	Ferrari F10	Ferrari 056 2.4 V8	BHR; 1	AUS; 4	MAL; 13^{†}	CHN; 4	ESP; 2	MON; 6	TUR; 8	CAN; 3	EUR; 8	GBR; 14	GER; 1	HUN; 2	BEL; Ret	**ITA**; 1	**SIN**; 1	JPN; 3	KOR; 1	BRA; 3	ABU; 7						**2nd**	**252**
2011	Scuderia Ferrari Marlboro	Ferrari 150º Italia	Ferrari 056 2.4 V8	AUS; 4	MAL; 6	CHN; 7	TUR; 3	ESP; 5	MON; 2	CAN; Ret	EUR; 2																	4th	257
2011	Scuderia Ferrari	Ferrari 150º Italia	Ferrari 056 2.4 V8									GBR; 1	GER; 2	HUN; 3	BEL; 4	ITA; 3	SIN; 4	JPN; 2	KOR; 5	IND; 3	ABU; 2	BRA; 4						4th	257
2012	Scuderia Ferrari	Ferrari F2012	Ferrari 056 2.4 V8	AUS; 5	MAL; 1	CHN; 9	BHR; 7	ESP; 2	MON; 3	CAN; 5	EUR; 1	**GBR**; 2	**GER**; 1	HUN; 5	BEL; Ret	ITA; 3	SIN; 3	JPN; Ret	KOR; 3	IND; 2	ABU; 2	USA; 3	BRA; 2					**2nd**	**278**
2013	Scuderia Ferrari	Ferrari F138	Ferrari 056 2.4 V8	AUS; 2	MAL; Ret	CHN; 1	BHR; 8	ESP; 1	MON; 7	CAN; 2	GBR; 3	GER; 4	HUN; 5	BEL; 2	ITA; 2	SIN; 2	KOR; 6	JPN; 4	IND; 11	ABU; 5	USA; 5	BRA; 3						**2nd**	**242**
2014	Scuderia Ferrari	Ferrari F14 T	Ferrari 059/3 1.6 V6 t	AUS; 4	MAL; 4	BHR; 9	CHN; 3	ESP; 6	MON; 4	CAN; 6	AUT; 5	GBR; 6	GER; 5	HUN; 2	BEL; 7	ITA; Ret	SIN; 4	JPN; Ret	RUS; 6	USA; 6	BRA; 6	ABU; 9						6th	161
2015	McLaren Honda	McLaren MP4-30	Honda RA615H 1.6 V6 t	AUS	MAL; Ret	CHN; 12	BHR; 11	ESP; Ret	MON; Ret	CAN; Ret	AUT; Ret	GBR; 10	HUN; 5	BEL; 13	ITA; 18^{†}	SIN; Ret	JPN; 11	RUS; 11	USA; 11	MEX; Ret	BRA; 15	ABU; 17						17th	11
2016	McLaren Honda	McLaren MP4-31	Honda RA616H 1.6 V6 t	AUS; Ret	BHR	CHN; 12	RUS; 6	ESP; Ret	MON; 5	CAN; 11	EUR; Ret	AUT; 18^{†}	GBR; 13	HUN; 7	GER; 12	BEL; 7	ITA; 14	SIN; 7	MAL; 7	JPN; 16	USA; 5	MEX; 13	BRA; 10	ABU; 10				10th	54
2017	McLaren Honda	McLaren MCL32	Honda RA617H 1.6 V6 t	AUS; Ret	CHN; Ret	BHR; 14^{†}	RUS; DNS	ESP; 12	MON	CAN; 16^{†}	AZE; 9	AUT; Ret	GBR; Ret	HUN; 6	BEL; Ret	ITA; 17^{†}	SIN; Ret	MAL; 11	JPN; 11	USA; Ret	MEX; 10	BRA; 8	ABU; 9					15th	17
2018	McLaren F1 Team	McLaren MCL33	Renault R.E.18 1.6 V6 t	AUS; 5	BHR; 7	CHN; 7	AZE; 7	ESP; 8	MON; Ret	CAN; Ret	FRA; 16^{†}	AUT; 8	GBR; 8	GER; 16^{†}	HUN; 8	BEL; Ret	ITA; Ret	SIN; 7	RUS; 14	JPN; 14	USA; Ret	MEX; Ret	BRA; 17	ABU; 11				11th	50
2021	Alpine F1 Team	Alpine A521	Renault E-Tech 20B 1.6 V6 t	BHR; Ret	EMI; 10	POR; 8	ESP; 17	MON; 13	AZE; 6	FRA; 8	STY; 9	AUT; 10	GBR; 7	HUN; 4	BEL; 11	NED; 6	ITA; 8	RUS; 6	TUR; 16	USA; Ret	MXC; 9	SAP; 9	QAT; 3	SAU; 13	ABU; 8			10th	81
2022	BWT Alpine F1 Team	Alpine A522	Renault E-Tech 22 1.6 V6 t	BHR; 9	SAU; Ret	AUS; 17	EMI; Ret	MIA; 11	ESP; 9	MON; 7	AZE; 7	CAN; 9	GBR; 5	AUT; 10	FRA; 6	HUN; 8	BEL; 5	NED; 6	ITA; Ret	SIN; Ret	JPN; 7	USA; 7	MXC; 19†	SAP; 5	ABU; Ret			9th	81
2023	Aston Martin Aramco Cognizant F1 Team	Aston Martin AMR23	Mercedes F1 M14 E Performance 1.6 V6 t	BHR; 3	SAU; 3	AUS; 3	AZE; 4^{6}	MIA; 3	MON; 2	ESP; 7	CAN; 2	AUT; 5^{5}	GBR; 7	HUN; 9	BEL; 5	NED; 2	ITA; 9	SIN; 15	JPN; 8	QAT; 6^{8}	USA; Ret	MXC; Ret	SAP; 3	LVG; 9	ABU; 7			4th	206
2024	Aston Martin Aramco F1 Team	Aston Martin AMR24	Mercedes F1 M15 E Performance 1.6 V6 t	BHR; 9	SAU; 5	AUS; 8	JPN; 6	CHN; 7	MIA; 9	EMI; 19	MON; 11	CAN; 6	ESP; 12	AUT; 18	GBR; 8	HUN; 11	BEL; 8	NED; 10	ITA; 11	AZE; 6	SIN; 8	USA; 13	MXC; Ret	SAP; 14	LVG; 11	QAT; 7	ABU; 9	9th	70
2025	Aston Martin Aramco F1 Team	Aston Martin AMR25	Mercedes-AMG F1 M16 E Performance 1.6 V6 t	AUS; Ret	CHN; Ret	JPN; 11	BHR; 15	SAU; 11	MIA; 15	EMI; 11	MON; Ret	ESP; 9	CAN; 7	AUT; 7	GBR; 9	BEL; 17	HUN; 5	NED; 8	ITA; Ret	AZE; 15	SIN; 7	USA; 10	MXC; Ret	SAP; 14^{6}	LVG; 11	QAT; 7^{7}	ABU; 6	10th	56
2026	Aston Martin Aramco F1 Team	Aston Martin AMR26	Honda RA626H 1.6 V6 t	AUS; Ret	CHN; Ret	JPN; 18	MIA; 15	CAN; Ret	MON; 10	BCN; Ret	AUT; 18	GBR; 18	BEL; 19	HUN; 14	NED; 9	ITA; Ret	ESP; 17	AZE; Ret	BHR; 8	SIN; 16	USA; 16	MXC; Ret	SAP; 12	LVG	QAT	ABU		17th*	7*

^{†} Did not finish, but was classified as he had completed more than 90% of the race distance.
* Season still in progress.

=== American open-wheel racing results ===
==== IndyCar Series ====
Year	Team	No.	Chassis	Engine	1	2	3	4	5	6	7	8	9	10	11	12	13	14	15	16	17	Rank	Points	Ref
2017	McLaren-Honda-Andretti	29	Dallara DW12	Honda	STP	LBH	ALA	PHX	IMS	INDY; 24	DET	DET	TXS	RDA	IOW	TOR	MDO	POC	GTW	WGL	SNM	29th	47	
2019	McLaren Racing	66	Dallara DW12	Chevrolet	STP	COA	ALA	LBH	IMS	INDY; DNQ	DET	DET	TXS	RDA	TOR	IOW	MDO	POC	GTW	POR	LAG	–	0	
2020	Arrow McLaren SP	66	Dallara DW12	Chevrolet	TXS	IMS	ROA	ROA	IOW	IOW	INDY; 21	GTW	GTW	MDO	MDO	IMS	IMS	STP				31st	18	

==== Indianapolis 500 ====
Year	Chassis	Engine	Start	Finish	Team
2017	Dallara	Honda	5	24	McLaren-Honda-Andretti
2019	Dallara	Chevrolet	DNQ		McLaren Racing
2020	Dallara	Chevrolet	26	21	Arrow McLaren SP

=== IMSA SportsCar Championship ===
(key) (Races in bold indicate pole position; races in italics indicate fastest lap)

Year	Team	Class	Make	Engine	1	2	3	4	5	6	7	8	9	10	Rank	Points
2018	United Autosports	P	Ligier JS P217	Gibson GK428 4.2 L V8	DAY; 13	SEB	LBH	MDO	DET	WGL	MOS	ELK	LGA	PET	58th	18
2019	Konica Minolta Cadillac	DPi	Cadillac DPi-V.R	Cadillac 5.5 L V8	DAY; 1	SEB	LBH	MDO	DET	WGL	MOS	ELK	LGA	PET	27th	35

==== 24 Hours of Daytona ====
Year	Team	Co-drivers	Car	Class	Laps	Pos.	Class Pos.
2018	(United States) United Autosports	(United Kingdom) Philip Hanson (United Kingdom) Lando Norris	Ligier JS P217-Gibson	P	718	38th	13th
2019	(United States) Konica Minolta Cadillac	(Japan) Kamui Kobayashi (United States) Jordan Taylor (Netherlands) Renger van der Zande	Cadillac DPi-V.R	DPi	593	**1st**	**1st**

=== Complete FIA World Endurance Championship results ===
(key) (Races in bold indicate pole position; races in italics indicate fastest lap)

Year	Entrant	Class	Chassis	Engine	1	2	3	4	5	6	7	8	Rank	Points
2018–19	Toyota Gazoo Racing	LMP1	Toyota TS050 Hybrid	Toyota 2.4 L Turbo V6 (Hybrid)	**SPA**; 1	**LMS**; 1	SIL; DSQ	**FUJ**; 2	SHA; 2	**SEB**; 1	SPA; 1	LMS; 1	1st	198

=== 24 Hours of Le Mans results ===
Year	Team	Co-Drivers	Car	Class	Laps	Pos.	Class Pos.
2018	(Japan) Toyota Gazoo Racing	(Switzerland) Sébastien Buemi (Japan) Kazuki Nakajima	Toyota TS050 Hybrid	LMP1	388	**1st**	**1st**
2019	(Japan) Toyota Gazoo Racing	(Switzerland) Sébastien Buemi (Japan) Kazuki Nakajima	Toyota TS050 Hybrid	LMP1	385	**1st**	**1st**

=== Dakar Rally results ===
Year	Class	Vehicle	Position	Stages won
2020	Car	(Japan) Toyota	13th	0

=== Formula One records ===
As of the 2026 São Paulo Grand Prix, Alonso holds the following Formula One records:

Record		Record held since	Ref
Total entries	448	2022 French Grand Prix	
Total starts	445	2022 Singapore Grand Prix	
Most classified finishes	366*	2023 Dutch Grand Prix	
Longest time between first and last starts	25 years, 249 days	2022 Monaco Grand Prix	
Longest time between first and last fastest laps	7,686 days	2023 Dutch Grand Prix	
Longest time between first and last points finishes	8,610 days	2024 Canadian Grand Prix	
Longest time between first and last podium finishes	7,532 days	2023 Dutch Grand Prix	
Most races between successive podium finishes	105	2021 Qatar Grand Prix	
Furthest distance driven in F1	120,355 km (74,785 mi)	2022 British Grand Prix	
Most laps driven in F1	24,028 laps	2023 Italian Grand Prix	

* Record shared with Lewis Hamilton

== Notes and references ==
=== References ===
Sporting positions
Preceded by Marc Gené	Euro Open Movistar by Nissan; Champion; 1999	Succeeded by Antonio García
Preceded by Régis Laconi; Yvan Muller; Gilles Panizzi	Race of Champions; Nations' Cup; 2001; With: Jesús Puras and Rubén Xaus	Succeeded by Colin Edwards; Jeff Gordon; Jimmie Johnson
Preceded by Michael Schumacher	Formula One World Champion; 2005–2006	Succeeded by Kimi Räikkönen
Preceded by Timo Bernhard; Brendon Hartley; Earl Bamber	Winner of the 24 Hours of Le Mans; 2018–2019; With: Sébastien Buemi and Kazuki Nakajima	Succeeded by Sébastien Buemi; Brendon Hartley; Kazuki Nakajima
Preceded by Timo Bernhard; Brendon Hartley; Earl Bamber	World Endurance Drivers Champion; 2018–19; With: Sébastien Buemi and Kazuki Nakajima	Succeeded by Mike Conway; Kamui Kobayashi; José María López
Awards
Preceded by Hicham El Guerrouj	Prince of Asturias Award for Sports; 2005	Succeeded by Spain national basketball team
Preceded by Kimi Räikkönen	Lorenzo Bandini Trophy; 2005	Succeeded by Mark Webber
Preceded by Kimi Räikkönen	Autosport Awards; International Driver of the Year; 2006	Succeeded by Lewis Hamilton
Preceded by Sebastian Vettel	DHL Fastest Lap Award; 2010	Succeeded by Mark Webber
Preceded by Alexander Rossi	Indianapolis 500; Rookie of the Year; 2017	Succeeded by Robert Wickens
Records
Preceded by Kimi Räikkönen; 353 entries, 349 starts (2001–2009, 2012–2021)	Most Grand Prix entries 448 entries, 445 starts (2001, 2003–2018, 2021–2025); 354th entry at the 2022 French Grand Prix; 350th start at the 2022 Singapore Grand Prix	Succeeded by Incumbent
Preceded by Rubens Barrichello; 22 years, 97 days (1994 Belgian GP)	Youngest Grand Prix polesitter 21 years, 236 days (2003 Malaysian Grand Prix)	Succeeded by Sebastian Vettel; 21 years, 72 days (2008 Italian GP)
Preceded by Jimmy Davies; 21 years, 285 days (1951 Indianapolis 500)	Youngest race leader, for at least one lap in Formula One; 21 years, 237 days (2003 Malaysian Grand Prix)	Succeeded by Sebastian Vettel; 20 years, 89 days (2007 Japanese GP)
Preceded by Ralf Schumacher; 21 years, 287 days (1997 Argentine GP)	Youngest driver to score a podium position in Formula One; 21 years, 237 days (2003 Malaysian Grand Prix)	Succeeded by Sebastian Vettel; 21 years, 73 days (2008 Italian GP)
Preceded by Bruce McLaren; 21 years, 322 days (1959 British GP)	Youngest driver to set fastest lap in Formula One; 21 years, 321 days (2003 Canadian Grand Prix)	Succeeded by Nico Rosberg; 20 years, 258 days (2006 Bahrain GP)
Preceded by Troy Ruttman; 22 years, 80 days (1952 Indianapolis 500)	Youngest Grand Prix race winner 22 years, 26 days (2003 Hungarian Grand Prix)	Succeeded by Sebastian Vettel; 21 years, 73 days (2008 Italian GP)
Preceded by Emerson Fittipaldi; 25 years, 273 days (1972 season)	Youngest Formula One; World Drivers' Champion; 24 years, 58 days (2005 season)	Succeeded by Lewis Hamilton; 23 years, 300 days (2008 season)
