= Matteo Bobbi =

Italian racing driver (born 1978)

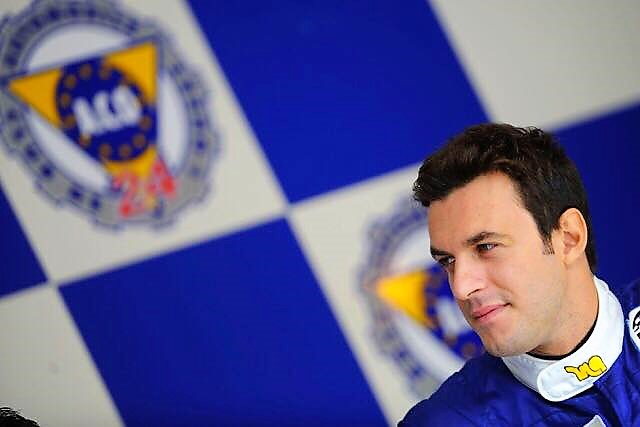
- Bobbi in 2011
- Nationality: (Italy) Italian
- Born: 2 July 1978 (age 48) Milan, Italy
- Categorisation: FIA Platinum (until 2013); FIA Gold (2014–)

Championship titles
- 2003: FIA GT Championship

24 Hours of Le Mans career
- Years: 2009
- Teams: Racing Box
- Best finish: DNF
- Class wins: 0

Matteo Bobbi (born 2 July 1978 in Milan) is an Italian racing driver with experience in several motor sport categories, including three years as a Minardi test driver in Formula One.

During a brief time with Formula One's Minardi as their test driver, Bobbi also began racing in sports cars, winning the 2003 FIA GT Championship with Thomas Biagi in a BMS Scuderia Italia Ferrari, and finishing as runner-up in 2004. In 2006, he won the GT2 class with Jaime Melo.

== Career ==
Bobbi began racing karts in 1995 and progressed to Formula Renault in 1998, where he finished on the podium several times. He tested a Formula One car for Minardi in 2000, and became their official test driver the following year. Also that year, he competed in the Spanish Formula Nissan Championship, in which he won at Valencia. He won six races in 2002, finishing as runner-up in the championship standings.

Bobbi continued to work with Minardi until mid-2003, including a Grand Prix weekend test session at the 2003 San Marino Grand Prix. Giovanni Minardi was his manager at the time. He also competed in the Rolex Sports Car Series for Cheever Racing.

Bobbi and Davide Valsecchi, who are currently working as Formula One commentators for Sky Italia, were temporarily suspended by the company for making sexist remarks during an on-air post-race analysis of the 2023 Spanish Grand Prix.

== Racing results ==
=== Complete Formula One participations ===
(key)

Year	Entrant	Chassis	Engine	1	2	3	4	5	6	7	8	9	10	11	12	13	14	15	16	WDC	Points
2003	European Minardi Cosworth	Minardi PS03	Cosworth V10	AUS	MAL	BRA	SMR; TD	ESP	AUT	MON	CAN	EUR	FRA	GBR	GER	HUN	ITA	USA	JPN	-	-

=== 24 Hours of Le Mans results ===
Year	Team	Co-Drivers	Car	Class	Laps	Pos.	Class Pos.
2009	(Italy) Racing Box	(Italy) Andrea Piccini (Italy) Thomas Biagi	Lola B08/80-Judd	LMP2	203	DNF	DNF

=== Complete GT1 World Championship results ===
Year	Team	Car	1	2	3	4	5	6	7	8	9	10	11	12	13	14	15	16	17	18	19	20	Pos	Points	Ref
2010	Triple H Team Hegersport	Maserati	ABU; QR; DNS	ABU; CR; 7	SIL; QR; 16	SIL; CR; 4	BRN; QR; 10	BRN; CR; 11	PRI; QR; 14	PRI; CR; 11													30th	19	
2010	Marc VDS Racing Team	Ford									SPA; QR	SPA; CR	NÜR; QR	NÜR; CR	ALG; QR	ALG; CR	NAV; QR; 12	NAV; CR; 10	INT; QR; 20	INT; CR; 15	SAN; QR; 15	SAN; CR; Ret	30th	19	
2011	DKR Engineering	Corvette	ABU; QR	ABU; CR	ZOL; QR	ZOL; CR	ALG; QR; 15	ALG; CR; Ret	SAC; QR	SAC; CR	SIL; QR	SIL; CR	NAV; QR	NAV; CR	PRI; QR	PRI; CR	ORD; QR	ORD; CR	BEI; QR	BEI; CR	SAN; QR	SAN; CR	43rd	0	

Sporting positions
Preceded by Christophe Bouchut	FIA GT Champion; 2003 with: Thomas Biagi	Succeeded by Fabrizio Gollin; Luca Cappellari
