= 2003 Formula One World Championship =

57th season of FIA Formula One motor racing

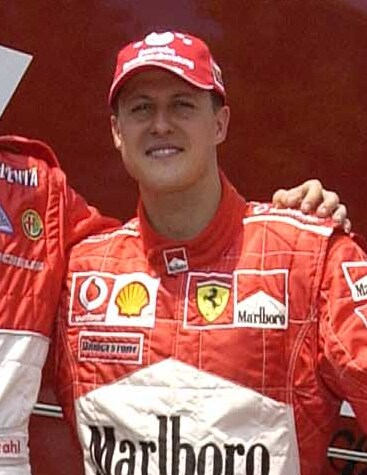
Michael Schumacher won a record-breaking sixth world title and his fourth consecutive world title for Ferrari with 93 points.

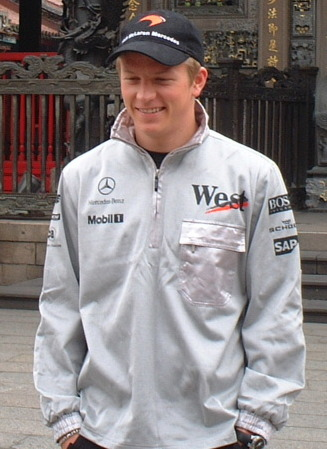
Kimi Räikkönen (pictured in 2002) finished second with 91 points, just two points behind Schumacher, for McLaren.

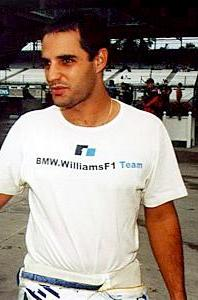
Juan Pablo Montoya (pictured in 2002) was third with 82 points for Williams.

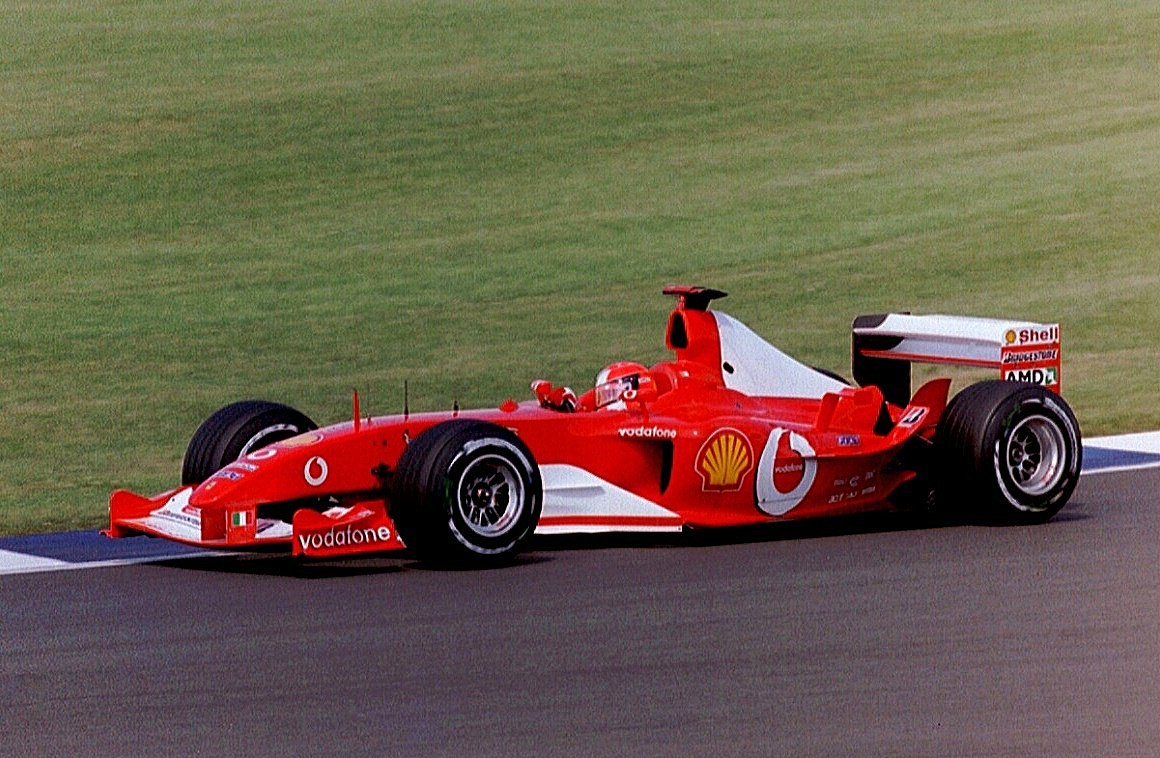
Ferrari won the 2003 FIA Formula One World Championship for Constructors.

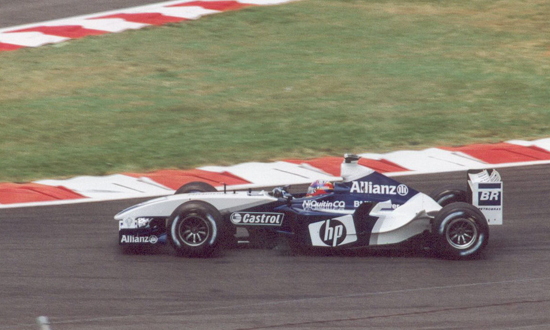
Williams-BMW placed second in the Constructors' Championship.

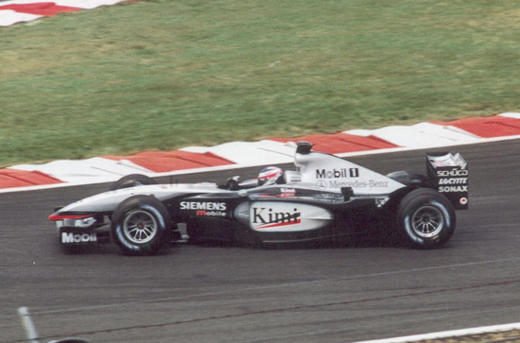
McLaren-Mercedes finished third in the Constructors' Championship, only two points behind Williams.

The 2003 FIA Formula One World Championship was the 57th season of FIA Formula One motor racing. It featured the 2003 Formula One World Championship for Drivers and the 2003 Formula One World Championship for Constructors, which were contested concurrently over a sixteen-race series that commenced on 9 March and ended on 12 October.

Defending champions Michael Schumacher and Scuderia Ferrari were again awarded the World Drivers' Championship and World Constructors' Championship, respectively. Schumacher's closest competitors were Kimi Räikkönen, driving for McLaren, and Juan Pablo Montoya, driving for Williams. It was Schumacher's sixth World Drivers' title overall, breaking Juan Manuel Fangio's 46-year-old record.

This was also the first season to introduce a new points system during which the points from Sunday's race were allocated to the top 8 drivers on a 10–8–6–5–4–3–2–1-basis, with the points system being valid until the end of 2009 ahead of another major overhaul in terms of the scoring system in 2010.

== Teams and drivers ==
The following teams and drivers competed in the 2003 FIA Formula One World Championship.

Entrant	Constructor	Chassis	Engine^{†}	Tyre	No.	Driver	Rounds
(Italy) Scuderia Ferrari Marlboro	Ferrari	F2002B; F2003-GA	Ferrari Tipo 051B; Ferrari Tipo 052	B	1	(Germany) Michael Schumacher	All
(Italy) Scuderia Ferrari Marlboro	Ferrari	F2002B; F2003-GA	Ferrari Tipo 051B; Ferrari Tipo 052	B	2	(Brazil) Rubens Barrichello	All
(United Kingdom) BMW WilliamsF1 Team	Williams-BMW	FW25	BMW P83	M	3	(Colombia) Juan Pablo Montoya	All
(United Kingdom) BMW WilliamsF1 Team	Williams-BMW	FW25	BMW P83	M	4	(Germany) Ralf Schumacher (Note: Ralf Schumacher was entered into the Italian Grand Prix, but later withdrew due to illness.)	All
(United Kingdom) BMW WilliamsF1 Team	Williams-BMW	FW25	BMW P83	M	4	(Spain) Marc Gené	14
(United Kingdom) West McLaren Mercedes	McLaren-Mercedes	MP4-17D	Mercedes FO110M; Mercedes FO110P	M	5	(United Kingdom) David Coulthard	All
(United Kingdom) West McLaren Mercedes	McLaren-Mercedes	MP4-17D	Mercedes FO110M; Mercedes FO110P	M	6	(Finland) Kimi Räikkönen	All
(France) Mild Seven Renault F1 Team	Renault	R23; R23B	Renault RS23	M	7	(Italy) Jarno Trulli	All
(France) Mild Seven Renault F1 Team	Renault	R23; R23B	Renault RS23	M	8	(Spain) Fernando Alonso	All
(Switzerland) Sauber Petronas	Sauber-Petronas	C22	Petronas 03A	B	9	(Germany) Nick Heidfeld	All
(Switzerland) Sauber Petronas	Sauber-Petronas	C22	Petronas 03A	B	10	(Germany) Heinz-Harald Frentzen	All
(Republic of Ireland) Benson & Hedges Jordan Ford	Jordan-Ford	EJ13	Ford RS1	B	11	(Italy) Giancarlo Fisichella	All
(Republic of Ireland) Benson & Hedges Jordan Ford	Jordan-Ford	EJ13	Ford RS1	B	12	(Republic of Ireland) Ralph Firman (Note: Ralph Firman was entered into the Hungarian Grand Prix, but later withdrew after he was injured during free practice.)	1–13, 15–16
(Republic of Ireland) Benson & Hedges Jordan Ford	Jordan-Ford	EJ13	Ford RS1	B	12	(Hungary) Zsolt Baumgartner	13–14
(United Kingdom) HSBC Jaguar Racing	Jaguar-Cosworth	R4	Cosworth CR-5	M	14	(Australia) Mark Webber	All
(United Kingdom) HSBC Jaguar Racing	Jaguar-Cosworth	R4	Cosworth CR-5	M	15	(Brazil) Antônio Pizzonia	1–11
(United Kingdom) HSBC Jaguar Racing	Jaguar-Cosworth	R4	Cosworth CR-5	M	15	(United Kingdom) Justin Wilson	12–16
(United Kingdom) Lucky Strike BAR Honda	BAR-Honda	005	Honda RA003E	B	16	(Canada) Jacques Villeneuve	1–15
(United Kingdom) Lucky Strike BAR Honda	BAR-Honda	005	Honda RA003E	B	16	(Japan) Takuma Sato	16
(United Kingdom) Lucky Strike BAR Honda	BAR-Honda	005	Honda RA003E	B	17	(United Kingdom) Jenson Button	All
(Italy) Trust Minardi Cosworth (Note: Minardi entered first six Grands Prix as "European Minardi Cosworth".)	Minardi-Cosworth	PS03	Cosworth CR-3	B	18	(United Kingdom) Justin Wilson	1–11
(Italy) Trust Minardi Cosworth	Minardi-Cosworth	PS03	Cosworth CR-3	B	18	(Denmark) Nicolas Kiesa	12–16
(Italy) Trust Minardi Cosworth	Minardi-Cosworth	PS03	Cosworth CR-3	B	19	(Netherlands) Jos Verstappen	All
(Japan) Panasonic Toyota Racing	Toyota	TF103	Toyota RVX-03	M	20	(France) Olivier Panis	All
(Japan) Panasonic Toyota Racing	Toyota	TF103	Toyota RVX-03	M	21	(Brazil) Cristiano da Matta	All

^{†} All engines were required to have ten cylinders and an engine capacity not exceeding 3000 cc, and all were of V10 configuration.

=== Friday drivers ===
Three constructors entered Friday-testing-only drivers over the course of the season.

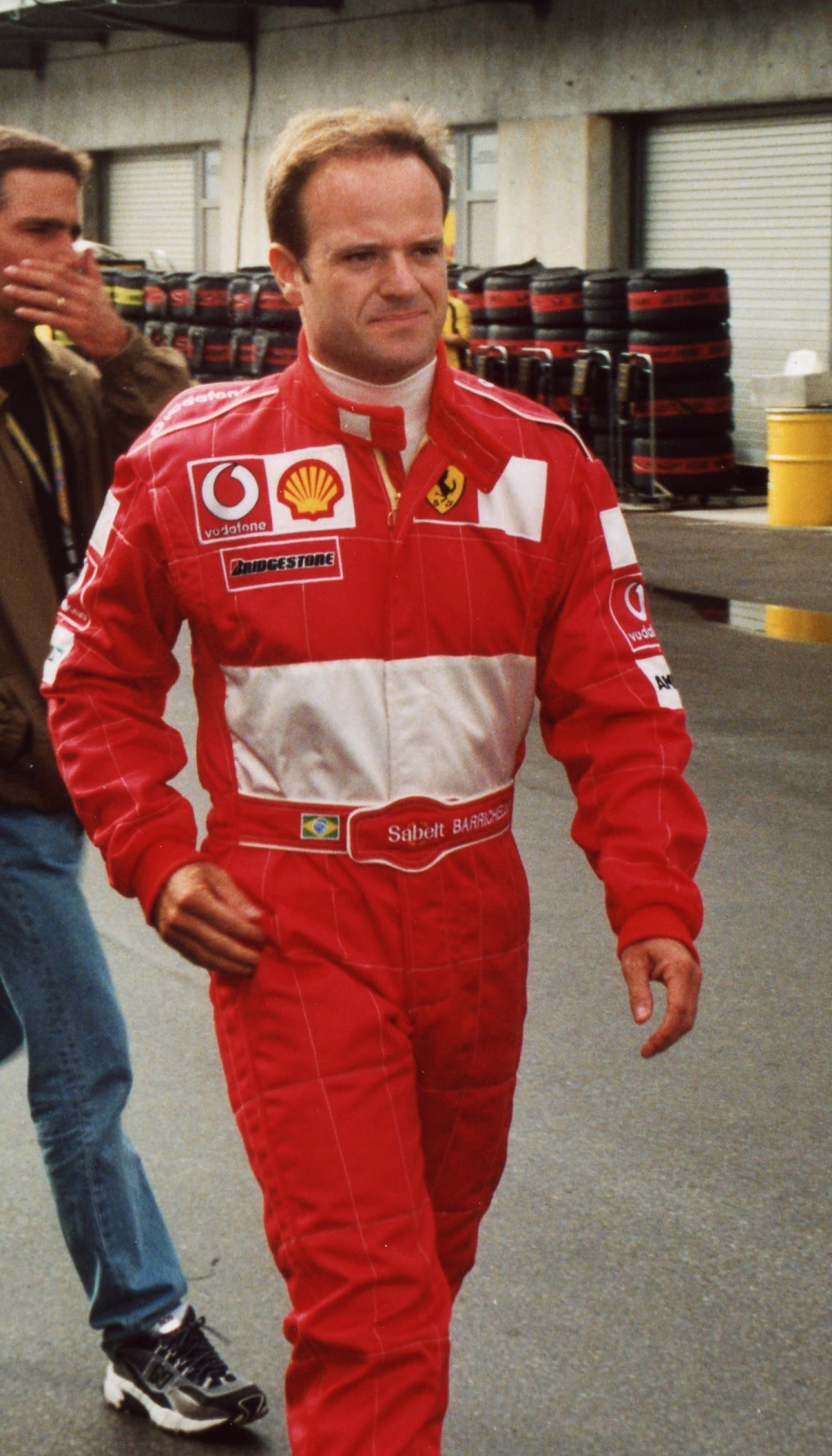
Rubens Barrichello (pictured in 2002) placed fourth.

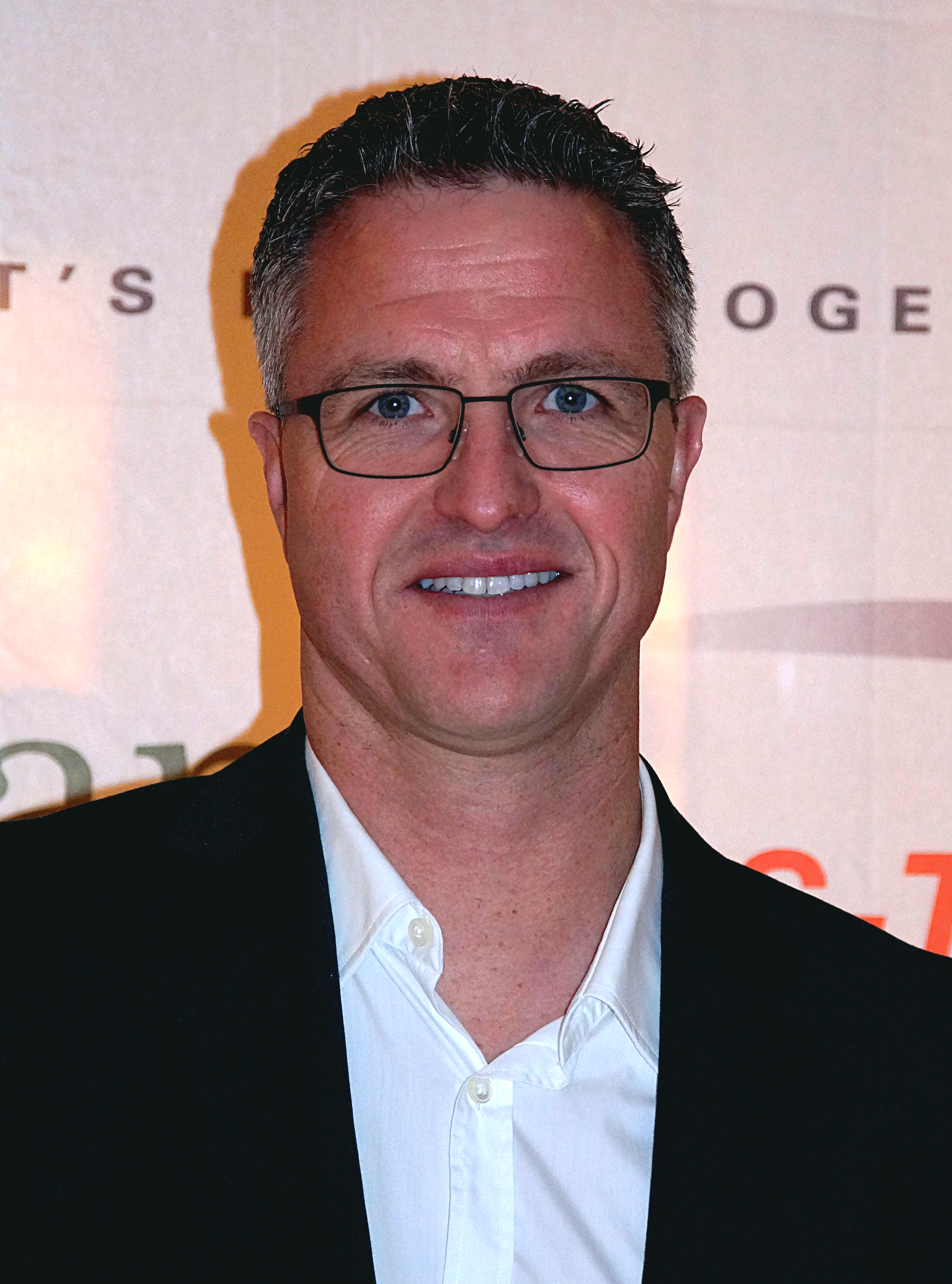
Ralf Schumacher (pictured in 2016) placed fifth, missing one race.

Drivers that took part in Friday testing sessions
Constructor	Friday drivers		
Constructor	No.	Driver name	Rounds
Renault	34	(United Kingdom) Allan McNish	1–9, 11–16
Renault	44	(France) Franck Montagny	10
Jordan–Ford	36	(Hungary) Zsolt Baumgartner (Sweden) Björn Wirdheim (Japan) Satoshi Motoyama	12–13; 15; 16
Minardi–Cosworth	39	(Italy) Matteo Bobbi (Italy) Gianmaria Bruni	4; 12–16

=== Team changes ===
- After failing to complete the 2002 season due to financial difficulties, the Arrows team had their application for admission to the 2003 championship rejected by the FIA prior to the season start date. No reason was publicly given by the FIA and Arrows subsequently folded after 25 years in Formula One since 1978.
- Jordan switched to Ford-branded Cosworth engines for 2003, after their previous suppliers, Honda, opted to focus on their partnership with BAR. Jordan's contract with the Japanese engine manufacturer was due to expire at the end of the 2003 season, but Honda were no longer willing to provide Jordan with free engines. A link-up with, and possible buy-out by, Asiatech was rumoured, although this did not prove to be the case, and, when funding was withdrawn from the company, Asiatech was wound down. Minardi, who had been using Asiatech engines in 2002, switched to Cosworth units for 2003.

=== Driver changes ===
- Fernando Alonso, the team's test driver in 2002, was promoted to a full-time drive at Renault, replacing Jenson Button. Button moved to BAR, where he took the seat vacated by the Toyota-bound Olivier Panis. Panis joined Formula One debutant, and reigning CART champion, Cristiano da Matta at the Japanese team, in an all-new lineup for 2003. Allan McNish, one of the drivers replaced at Toyota, signed with Renault as a test driver, while his teammate from 2002, Mika Salo, left Formula One altogether.
- Felipe Massa left his Sauber drive to assume the duties of test driver for Ferrari. His place at Sauber was taken by Heinz-Harald Frentzen, who had replaced Massa on a one-off basis for the United States Grand Prix (by which time Frentzen was already confirmed as a Sauber driver for 2003), after having driven for Arrows before the team's collapse.
- Takuma Sato left the Jordan team to take the place of several others (Anthony Davidson, Darren Manning, Ryo Fukuda and Patrick Lemarié) as the sole test driver for BAR, being replaced by 2002 Formula Nippon champion Ralph Firman.
- Jaguar replaced both Eddie Irvine and Pedro de la Rosa for 2003. Their new drivers were Mark Webber, who signed from Minardi, and debutant Antônio Pizzonia, who drove in the International Formula 3000 series in 2002 whilst also performing test driver duties for Williams. Webber's vacated seat at Minardi was filled by Justin Wilson, who had won the International Formula 3000 title in 2001. Alex Yoong's Minardi contract from 2002 was not renewed and he moved to the CART series, albeit only for a brief stint, in 2003. He was replaced at Minardi by Jos Verstappen, who had spent a season on the sidelines after losing his Arrows drive to Heinz-Harald Frentzen in 2002.

==== Mid-season changes ====
- Minardi's Justin Wilson joined Jaguar from the German Grand Prix onwards, filling in for the under-performing Antônio Pizzonia, who was offered a test driving role at the team but turned it down. He would later resurface as a test driver at Williams. Wilson's seat at Minardi was taken by the Danish driver Nicolas Kiesa, who joined Formula One from the International Formula 3000 series.
- Ralph Firman suffered injuries as a result of a crash during practice in Hungary. He was replaced by Zsolt Baumgartner for the Italian Grand Prix before returning to finish the season for Jordan. Baumgartner, another driver who had been competing in the International Formula 3000 series, was the first Hungarian driver to race in Formula One.
- Ralf Schumacher was unable to race in Italy, due to concussion. He was replaced at Williams by Marc Gené, the team's test driver, for that particular race, before returning for the following Grand Prix.
- After a string of disappointing results in 2003, Jacques Villeneuve elected to end his season one race early, and was replaced at BAR by test driver Takuma Sato for the Japanese Grand Prix. Villeneuve would later drive for Renault in 2004 as a replacement driver, and sign a multi-year contract at Sauber for 2005 (though he was replaced in 2006).

== Calendar ==
The 2003 FIA Formula One World Championship was contested over the following sixteen races:

Round	Grand Prix	Circuit	Date
1	Australian Grand Prix	(Australia) Albert Park Circuit, Melbourne	9 March
2	Malaysian Grand Prix	(Malaysia) Sepang International Circuit, Kuala Lumpur	23 March
3	Brazilian Grand Prix	(Brazil) Autódromo José Carlos Pace, São Paulo	6 April
4	San Marino Grand Prix	(Italy) Autodromo Enzo e Dino Ferrari, Imola	20 April
5	Spanish Grand Prix	(Spain) Circuit de Catalunya, Montmeló	4 May
6	Austrian Grand Prix	(Austria) A1-Ring, Spielberg	18 May
7	Monaco Grand Prix	Circuit de Monaco, Monte Carlo	1 June
8	Canadian Grand Prix	(Canada) Circuit Gilles Villeneuve, Montreal	15 June
9	European Grand Prix	(Germany) Nürburgring, Nürburg	29 June
10	French Grand Prix	(France) Circuit de Nevers Magny-Cours, Magny-Cours	6 July
11	British Grand Prix	(United Kingdom) Silverstone Circuit, Silverstone	20 July
12	German Grand Prix	(Germany) Hockenheimring, Hockenheim	3 August
13	Hungarian Grand Prix	(Hungary) Hungaroring, Mogyoród	24 August
14	Italian Grand Prix	(Italy) Autodromo Nazionale di Monza, Monza	14 September
15	United States Grand Prix	(United States) Indianapolis Motor Speedway, Speedway	28 September
16	Japanese Grand Prix	(Japan) Suzuka Circuit, Suzuka	12 October

The Belgian Grand Prix scheduled for 31 August was cancelled due to a row over tobacco advertising, despite multiple races taking place without such advertising.

== Regulation changes ==
=== Technical regulations ===
- On 26 June 2002, the World Motor Sport Council (WMSC) declared that the HANS ('Head and Neck Support') device would be made compulsory in Formula 1. This was not without controversy, as many drivers voiced their complaints, including Rubens Barrichello, Jacques Villeneuve, Justin Wilson and Nick Heidfeld.
- On 26 February 2003, the FIA decided that no fuel could be added to or removed from the cars between qualifying and race. This was decided based on safety grounds, as it would avoid the danger that, in a search for extra performance in qualifying, teams would run their cars in a manner which might be unsuitable or even dangerous at the start of the race.
- Hydraulic power-assisted rack and pinion steering system became mandatory for all Formula One entrants due to manual rack and pinion steering system deemed too difficult to cornering for drivers.

The 2003 season is notable for being the third and last season that fully-automatic gearboxes and launch control were allowed to be used. Both electronic driver aids had been used since the 2001 Spanish Grand Prix, but a change in the technical regulations saw the FIA banning both systems for 2004. The ban on traction control was ultimately delayed until the 2008 season.

=== Sporting regulations ===
- After Ferrari's infamous decision during the 2002 Austrian Grand Prix, ordering Rubens Barrichello to let Michael Schumacher by, any team orders which interfered with a race result were prohibited from the 2003 season onwards.
- Only one type of wet weather tyre was allowed to be used in wet weather races. This immediately raised concerns with the tyre suppliers. And after the chaotic Brazilian Grand Prix, in which drivers tried to call off the first qualifying session and which saw six drivers crash in the same corner, this rule was scrapped.

Furthermore, the 2003 season saw the introduction of new regulations intended to increase F1's excitement, to halt falling global television audiences that had occurred during the previous season, and to help alleviate the financial difficulties of the smaller teams:

- One-lap qualifying was introduced as a way for smaller teams to get more television exposure. In the qualifying session on Friday, drivers would go out in current championship order, to determine the running order on Saturday. A faster lap time on Friday would mean a later starting time for them on Saturday. On Saturday, drivers contested for their starting position in the race on Sunday, with the fastest driver awarded pole position. In both sessions, drivers could only do one timed lap.
- Optional Friday testing at Grand Prix events was introduced in exchange for fewer miles on stand-alone test days. This was intended to give smaller teams a cheaper alternative to these test days, which were to be banned in 2004.
- The points system for both the Constructors' and Drivers' titles was changed from 10–6–4–3–2–1 (used since 1991) for the first six finishers at each round to 10–8–6–5–4–3–2–1 for the first eight finishers in an attempt to make the title contests closer and provide better competition between midfield teams.

== Season summary ==
=== Rounds 1 to 3 ===
Going into the season, Ferrari was the team to beat, having won the previous four Constructors' Championships. There was a lot of speculation about the effect of the new regulations on their dominance and overall form.

In qualifying for the first race, the Australian Grand Prix, nothing seemed to have changed at the front. Reigning Drivers' Champion Michael Schumacher started in pole position, with his teammate Rubens Barrichello beside him. Juan Pablo Montoya in the Williams started in third, but the other Williams and McLaren drivers (Ferrari's main rivals in 2002) started way further down the grid. So the new qualifying format did shake up the order somewhat. After heavy rainfall, the race started in half-wet conditions. The Ferraris started on wet tyres, while Montoya started on dries, as did Kimi Räikkönen at the last minute when he pitted on the end of the formation lap and, thus, started in last place. While Schumacher led away, Barrichello jumped the start and received a drive-through penalty. The track was drying quickly and the changeable conditions took some by surprise: Barrichello crashed on lap five, followed by rookies Ralph Firman and Cristiano da Matta. After two safety car periods, it was last-starting Räikkönen that found himself in the lead of the race, followed by Schumacher and McLaren teammate David Coulthard. During the second round of pit stops, the Ferrari retook the lead and Räikkönen fell back to third, having sped in the pit lane and being served a drive-through penalty. Soon, however, Schumacher sustained damage from a curb stone and received a black-and-orange flag, forcing him to pit for repairs. He fell down to fourth behind Räikkönen, missing out on the podium for the first time since the 2001 Italian Grand Prix. (It also ended Ferrari's podium streak since the 1999 European Grand Prix.) It was Montoya who picked up the scraps, until he spun at the first corner and saw Coulthard pass him for the win. (This would be the Scot's last race victory.)

At the Malaysian Grand Prix, it was the Renault team that blocked out the first row. Fernando Alonso, being the then-youngest driver to achieve pole position, started ahead of Jarno Trulli. Michael Schumacher started in third and tried to pass Trulli into the first corner, but tapped him into a spin. The Italian rejoined in last place, but Schumacher had to pit for repairs and was given a driving-through penalty on top of that. His main rivals were just as unlucky: Montoya was rear-ended by Jaguar driver Antônio Pizzonia and lost two laps during a rear-wing replacement, while Coulthard had to retire on the second lap when his car's electronics failed. Räikkönen took the lead, ahead of Alonso and Barrichello. During the second round of pit stops, Barrichello took second place, but Räikkönen was unchallenged, scored his first career win and took the lead in the championship. Justin Wilson, driving for Minardi, had to retire when his HANS device got loose and pinched his shoulders, resulting in temporary paralysis of both his arms. (He recovered before the next race.)

Practice for the Brazilian Grand Prix was held in torrential weather conditions. For qualifying, it was no different, and the majority of drivers signed a petition, mandating the FIA to cancel the session if track conditions did not improve. When the rain eased off, however, the session went ahead as planned. The second qualifying session on Saturday was held in warm and dry conditions. Rubens Barrichello achieved pole position for Ferrari. Behind him stood David Coulthard for McLaren and a surprising Mark Webber for Jaguar. On Sunday, the rain was back and even under safety car conditions, drivers struggled to keep the car on track. When the field was released, Coulthard immediately overtook Barrichello, and in the next three laps, Räikkönen passed both of them to take the lead. The track began to dry, except for turn three, where a stream of water was running across the asphalt. Over the course of the race, six drivers crashed when going through that corner, including Michael Schumacher. This led to four safety car interventions. When a lot of drivers had to pit for fuel, Kimi Räikkönen and Giancarlo Fisichella became the leading pair and the Jordan driver overtook the McLaren when he ran wide. It was expected that Coulthard would win after those two had done their stops, but then, Webber and Alonso crashed heavily and the race was stopped. Alonso sustained bruises and was kept in hospital for observation. The sporting regulations said to take the order from two laps before the race suspension as the final result, and Räikkönen was declared the winner. When the FIA found a timekeeping error, however, this was corrected and Fisichella was awarded his first-ever win in an unofficial ceremony ahead of the next race.

After three eventful races, Räikkonen (McLaren) was leading the championship with 24 points, ahead of his teammate Coulthard (15 points) and Alonso (Renault, 14 points). Reigning champion Michael Schumacher was down in sixth place.

=== Rounds 4 to 8 ===
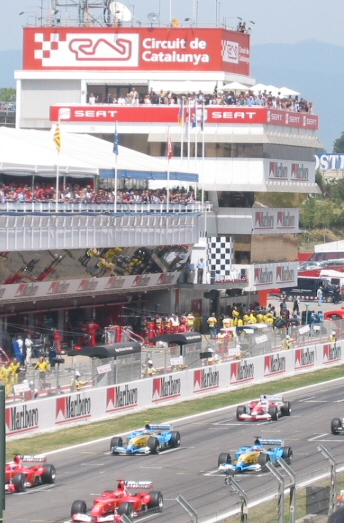
Drivers lining up for the start at the Spanish Grand Prix

For the San Marino Grand Prix, Michael Schumacher achieved pole position. His brother Ralf and his teammate Rubens Barrichello started behind him. At the start, Ralf overtook Michael but eventually fell back to fourth position. The Ferrari driver won the race, ahead of championship leader Räikkönen and Barrichello.

The next race in Spain saw Ferrari debut their new car and their drivers taking up the front row in qualifying. Behind them were the Renaults of Fernando Alonso and Jarno Trulli. At the start, Alonso overtook Barrichello for second and the top three went on to finish in this order. Trulli made contact with David Coulthard and retired. Räikkönen crashed into the stalled Jaguar of Antônio Pizzonia.

In Austria, Michael Schumacher started on pole and won the race. It was the third consecutive weekend that he achieved this. He did have to cope with a slow pit stop and small fire, but he was unchallenged by his rivals, as Räikkönen slowed down with engine-related performance problems and Montoya retired with a blown engine. The Finn held on to second, ahead of Barrichello in third.

The twisty track of Monaco favoured the Michelin runners: Ralf Schumacher (Williams) started on pole, ahead of Kimi Räikkönen (McLaren) and Juan Pablo Montoya (Williams). The race featured no on-track overtakes, so the order was decided by the start and the pit stops. Montoya took the win, just six tenths ahead of Räikkönen, and Michael Schumacher completed the podium. Ralf finished in fourth.

In Canada, Ralf Schumacher started on pole again, with his teammate beside him. Michael Schumacher started in third, but during the race, managed to get ahead of both Williams drivers. It was a race of attrition, where just nine drivers finished and Schumacher, too, had to nurse his ailing car home. But the German held on to take the win.

Recovering from his start to the season, Schumacher had taken the lead in the championship (54 points) and was now three points ahead of Kimi Räikkönen (51). A group of four drivers, led by Fernando Alonso (34 points), were fighting over third place.

=== Rounds 9 to 13 ===
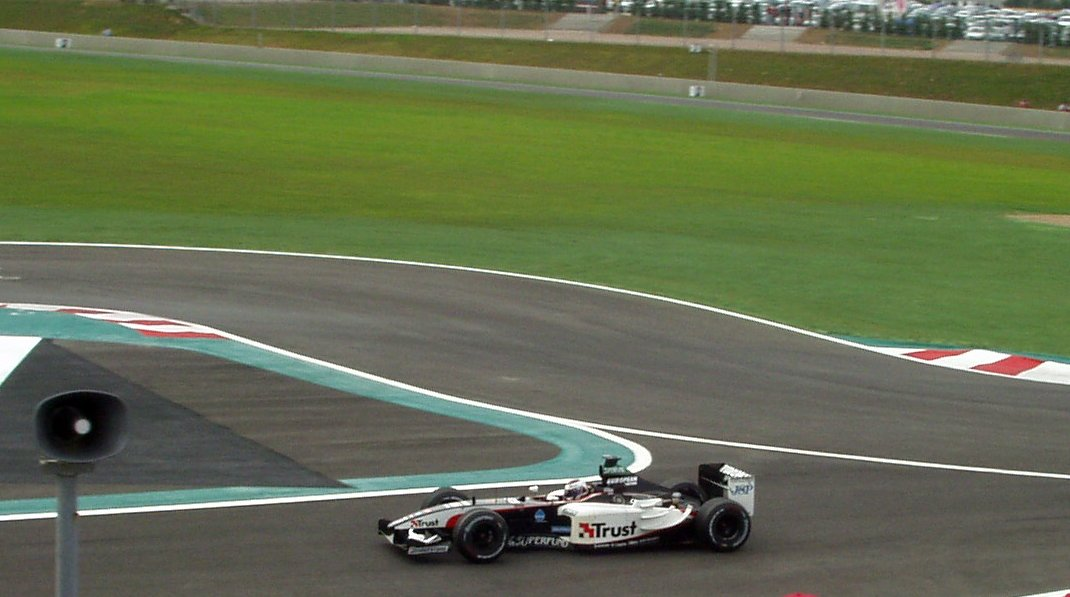
Jos Verstappen set the fastest time in Friday qualifying on a drying track

The European Grand Prix, held at the Nürburgring, saw Kimi Räikkönen take pole position and lead the race, until his McLaren's engine broke down on lap 25. Ralf Schumacher in the Williams came through to take a victory on home soil. His teammate Juan Pablo Montoya and his brother Michael Schumacher collided on lap 43, dropping the German down to sixth. Montoya held on to take second on the podium, ahead of Ferrari's Rubens Barrichello. Williams overtook McLaren for second position in the Constructors' Championship.

At the Circuit de Magny-Cours in France, Ralf Schumacher started from pole, with Montoya and Michael Schumacher behind him. This was also the order of the top three at the finish. This would be Ralf's last win in F1 and, as of 2025, Williams' last 1-2 finish.

For the British Grand Prix, it was Rubens Barrichello who achieved pole position, but Jarno Trulli in the Renault who led into the first corner. There was a brief safety car intervention to clear up debris from David Coulthard's McLaren, but the race was truly disrupted when, on lap 11, Neil Horan invaded the track. Wearing a kilt and waving religious banners, he ran towards the cars, who swerved to avoid him. A track marshal tackled him and pulled him to the side. The safety car was deployed and almost everyone pitted. Among others, Michael Schumacher, Fernando Alonso and Juan Pablo Montoya fell outside the top ten. The Toyota drivers Cristiano da Matta and Olivier Panis opted not to pit and took the lead, ahead of Coulthard. It was Räikkönen, eventually, who passed Da Matta for the lead. Under pressure from Rubens Barrichello, however, the Finn made a mistake and gave up the win. A further error allowed Montoya to get by into second position.

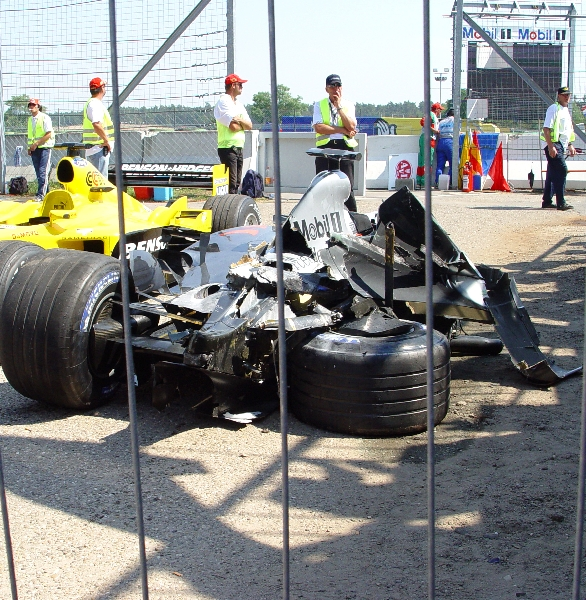
Kimi Räikkönen's McLaren after the German Grand Prix

The F1 circus was back in Germany, this time for the German Grand Prix in Hockenheim. Montoya achieved pole position, just 0.018 seconds ahead of his teammate. At the start, Ralf Schumacher squeezed Räikkönen and Barrichello, who hit each other and crashed out, with Ralf retiring a lap later. He was charged with a ten-place grid penalty, but this was reversed after a successful appeal. Montoya held on to win, ahead of Coulthard and Trulli, the Renault driver scoring his only podium of the season.

The last race of the summer was held on the revamped Hungaroring in Hungary. Alonso scored pole position and held on to win the race. It was his first victory and it made him the youngest winning driver in F1 history. Räikkönen and Montoya joined him on the podium, while Michael Schumacher could only manage eighth.

In the Drivers' Championship, Räikkönen (70 points) and Montoya (71 points) had closed up to Schumacher (72 points), leaving no room for error with just three races to go. In the Constructors' Championship, it was now the Williams team in the lead with 129 points, over Ferrari with 121 and McLaren with 115.

=== Rounds 14 to 16 ===
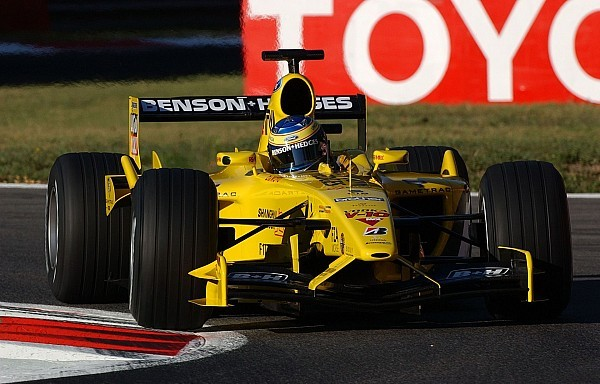
Zsolt Baumgartner drove two races for Jordan.

On home soil at Monza, with the support of the tifosi, the Scuderia Ferrari did what they had to do: Michael Schumacher qualified on pole and won. Juan Pablo Montoya for Williams and Michael's teammate Rubens Barrichello joined him on the podium. Up to the 2023 Italian Grand Prix, this was the shortest-duration (fully completed) race in F1 history, and it was a race with one of F1's highest-ever average speeds (247.6 km/h (153.9 mph)), dethroned only 22 years later by the 2025 Italian Grand Prix.

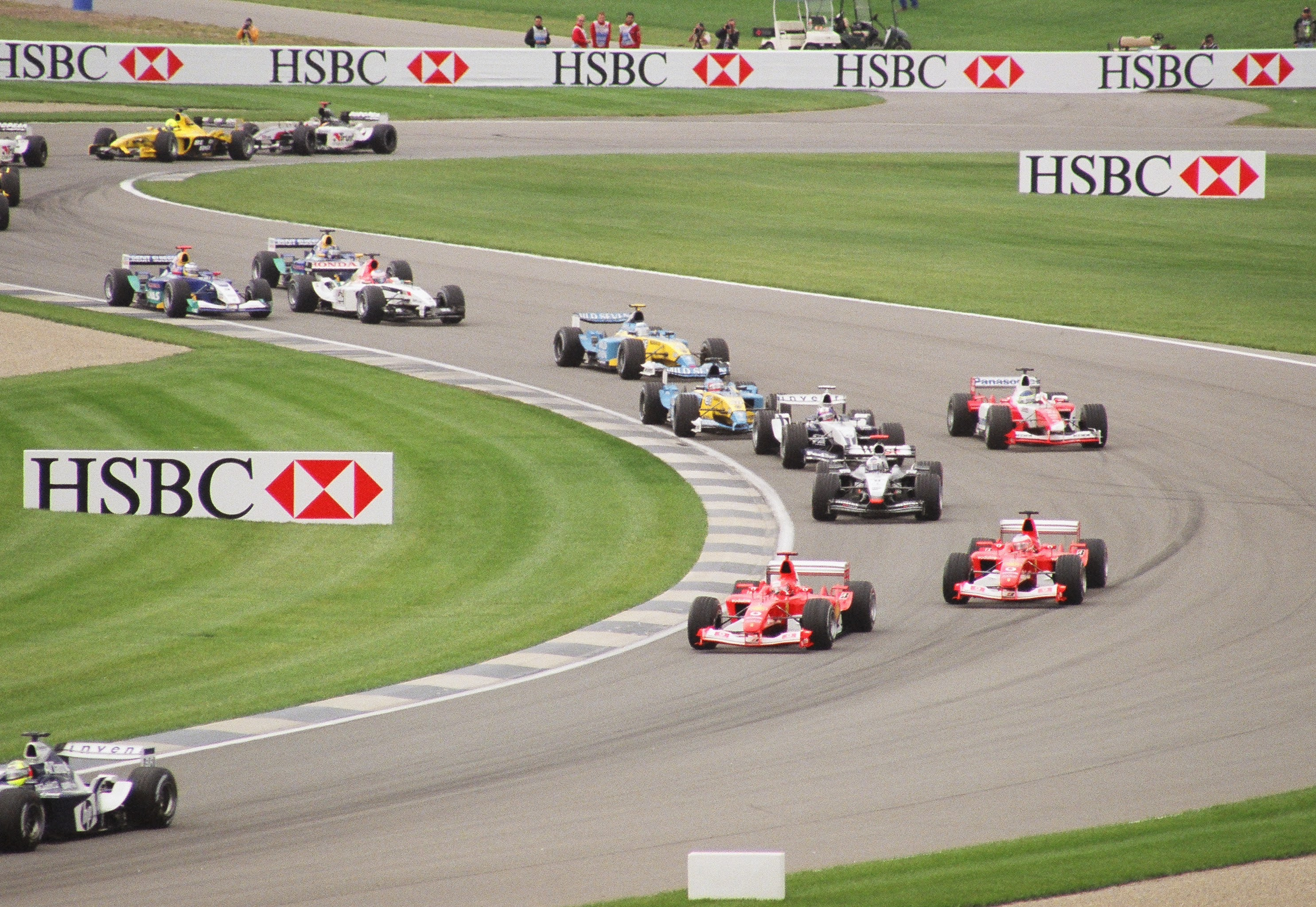
Start of the 2003 United States Grand Prix

Kimi Räikkönen had not given up his championship hopes and achieved pole position for the United States Grand Prix. Barrichello managed second and Olivier Panis scored Toyota's best qualifying result when he set the third-fastest time. Montoya and Schumacher started in fourth and seventh, respectively. Räikkönen made a clean start, but Barrichello was passed by Panis when his launch control failed to automatically shift up to second gear. Montoya was falling back and, on the third lap, collided with Barrichello, earning himself a drive-through penalty. Rain started falling and on lap 6, Panis was the first to switch to intermediate tyres. On the next lap, Montoya was back behind Schumacher and, on his second attempt, managed to overtake him. As the rain eased up, all drivers that had pitted, switched back to dry tyres, only for the rain to reappear on lap 18. Schumacher decided to pit and stay on dry tyres, but then came in again on lap 22 for intermediates. Mark Webber shortly led the race before crashing out, with the same happening to then-leader David Coulthard. On lap 38, Schumacher had passed all drivers in front of him and held on to take the win. Championship rival Räikkönen came home in second, followed by Heinz-Harald Frentzen in the Sauber.

Montoya finished sixth, which meant he was now out of contention for the championship. Räikkönen's only hope was to win the last race of the season and Schumacher failing to finish. In the Constructors' Championship, Ferrari was leading Williams with 147 over 144 points.

The Japanese Grand Prix saw Michael Schumacher qualify in 14th, his worst grid position in a Ferrari. Kimi Räikkönen started in 8th, so he faced an uphill battle to take the win that he needed. Räikkönen needed to win and Schumacher not to score a single point in order for him to become Drivers' Champion, since Schumacher held the tiebreaker on wins over Räikkönen, 6 to 1. Rubens Barrichello started on pole, with Montoya beside him. The Toyota's commenced their home race in third and fourth. On the first lap, Fernando Alonso in the Renault jumped up to third and Montoya took the lead. Schumacher was careful to stay out of trouble at the start, looking to score at least one point, but when trying to overtake Takuma Sato, he hit the local driver's rear wheel and lost his front wing. This forced him to pit and he rejoined in last place. This practically handed the Constructors' Championship to Williams, until Montoya suddenly retired with a hydraulics problem. Schumacher narrowly avoided a replication of his incident at the chicane, this time with Cristiano da Matta, but it led to his brother Ralf running into the back of him. All this left Räikkönen unchallenged to climb up to second position, but this was insufficient to overtake Schumacher on points. Barrichello took the win which was sufficient for Ferrari to win the Constructors' Champion.

Michael Schumacher ended the season on 93 points, ahead of Kimi Räikkönen with 91 and Juan Pablo Montoya with 82. It was a record sixth Drivers' Championship and Schumacher's fourth in a row. Ferrari were Constructors' Champions for the fifth consecutive year.

== Results and standings ==
=== Grands Prix ===
Round	Grand Prix	Pole position	Fastest lap	Winning driver	Winning constructor	Report
1	(Australia) Australian Grand Prix	(Germany) Michael Schumacher	(Finland) Kimi Räikkönen	(United Kingdom) David Coulthard	(United Kingdom) McLaren-Mercedes	Report
2	(Malaysia) Malaysian Grand Prix	(Spain) Fernando Alonso	(Germany) Michael Schumacher	(Finland) Kimi Räikkönen	(United Kingdom) McLaren-Mercedes	Report
3	(Brazil) Brazilian Grand Prix	(Brazil) Rubens Barrichello	(Brazil) Rubens Barrichello	(Italy) Giancarlo Fisichella	(Republic of Ireland) Jordan-Ford	Report
4	(Italy) San Marino Grand Prix	(Germany) Michael Schumacher	(Germany) Michael Schumacher	(Germany) Michael Schumacher	(Italy) Ferrari	Report
5	(Spain) Spanish Grand Prix	(Germany) Michael Schumacher	(Brazil) Rubens Barrichello	(Germany) Michael Schumacher	(Italy) Ferrari	Report
6	(Austria) Austrian Grand Prix	(Germany) Michael Schumacher	(Germany) Michael Schumacher	(Germany) Michael Schumacher	(Italy) Ferrari	Report
7	Monaco Grand Prix	(Germany) Ralf Schumacher	(Finland) Kimi Räikkönen	(Colombia) Juan Pablo Montoya	(United Kingdom) Williams-BMW	Report
8	(Canada) Canadian Grand Prix	(Germany) Ralf Schumacher	(Spain) Fernando Alonso	(Germany) Michael Schumacher	(Italy) Ferrari	Report
9	(Germany) European Grand Prix	(Finland) Kimi Räikkönen	(Finland) Kimi Räikkönen	(Germany) Ralf Schumacher	(United Kingdom) Williams-BMW	Report
10	(France) French Grand Prix	(Germany) Ralf Schumacher	(Colombia) Juan Pablo Montoya	(Germany) Ralf Schumacher	(United Kingdom) Williams-BMW	Report
11	(United Kingdom) British Grand Prix	(Brazil) Rubens Barrichello	(Brazil) Rubens Barrichello	(Brazil) Rubens Barrichello	(Italy) Ferrari	Report
12	(Germany) German Grand Prix	(Colombia) Juan Pablo Montoya	(Colombia) Juan Pablo Montoya	(Colombia) Juan Pablo Montoya	(United Kingdom) Williams-BMW	Report
13	(Hungary) Hungarian Grand Prix	(Spain) Fernando Alonso	(Colombia) Juan Pablo Montoya	(Spain) Fernando Alonso	(France) Renault	Report
14	(Italy) Italian Grand Prix	(Germany) Michael Schumacher	(Germany) Michael Schumacher	(Germany) Michael Schumacher	(Italy) Ferrari	Report
15	United States Grand Prix	(Finland) Kimi Räikkönen	(Germany) Michael Schumacher	(Germany) Michael Schumacher	(Italy) Ferrari	Report
16	(Japan) Japanese Grand Prix	(Brazil) Rubens Barrichello	(Germany) Ralf Schumacher	(Brazil) Rubens Barrichello	(Italy) Ferrari	Report

=== Scoring system ===
Points were awarded to the top eight finishing drivers and constructors as follows:

Position	1st	2nd	3rd	4th	5th	6th	7th	8th
Points	10	8	6	5	4	3	2	1

=== World Drivers' Championship standings ===
Pos.	Driver	AUS (Australia)	MAL (Malaysia)	BRA (Brazil)	SMR (Italy)	ESP (Spain)	AUT (Austria)	MON (Monaco)	CAN (Canada)	EUR (Germany)	FRA (France)	GBR (United Kingdom)	GER (Germany)	HUN (Hungary)	ITA (Italy)	USA (United States)	JPN (Japan)	Points
1	(Germany) Michael Schumacher	4^{P}	6^{F}	Ret	1^{P}^{F}	1^{P}	1^{P}^{F}	3	1	5	3	4	7	8	1^{P}^{F}	1^{F}	8	93
2	(Finland) Kimi Räikkönen	3^{F}	1	2	2	Ret	2	2^{F}	6	Ret^{P}^{F}	4	3	Ret	2	4	2^{P}	2	91
3	(Colombia) Juan Pablo Montoya	2	12	Ret	7	4	Ret	1	3	2	2^{F}	2	1^{P}^{F}	3^{F}	2	6	Ret	82
4	(Brazil) Rubens Barrichello	Ret	2	Ret^{P}^{F}	3	3^{F}	3	8	5	3	7	1^{P}^{F}	Ret	Ret	3	Ret	1^{P}	65
5	(Germany) Ralf Schumacher	8	4	7	4	5	6	4^{P}	2^{P}	1	1^{P}	9	Ret	4	WD	Ret	12^{F}	58
6	(Spain) Fernando Alonso	7	3^{P}	3	6	2	Ret	5	4^{F}	4	Ret	Ret	4	1^{P}	8	Ret	Ret	55
7	(United Kingdom) David Coulthard	1	Ret	4	5	Ret	5	7	Ret	15^{†}	5	5	2	5	Ret	Ret	3	51
8	(Italy) Jarno Trulli	5	5	8	13	Ret	8	6	Ret	Ret	Ret	6	3	7	Ret	4	5	33
9	(United Kingdom) Jenson Button	10	7	Ret	8	9	4	DNS	Ret	7	Ret	8	8	10	Ret	Ret	4	17
10	(Australia) Mark Webber	Ret	Ret	9^{†}	Ret	7	7	Ret	7	6	6	14	11^{†}	6	7	Ret	11	17
11	(Germany) Heinz-Harald Frentzen	6	9	5	11	Ret	DNS	Ret	Ret	9	12	12	Ret	Ret	13^{†}	3	Ret	13
12	(Italy) Giancarlo Fisichella	12^{†}	Ret	1	15^{†}	Ret	Ret	10	Ret	12	Ret	Ret	13^{†}	Ret	10	7	Ret	12
13	(Brazil) Cristiano da Matta	Ret	11	10	12	6	10	9	11^{†}	Ret	11	7	6	11	Ret	9	7	10
14	(Germany) Nick Heidfeld	Ret	8	Ret	10	10	Ret	11	Ret	8	13	17	10	9	9	5	9	6
15	(France) Olivier Panis	Ret	Ret	Ret	9	Ret	Ret	13	8	Ret	8	11	5	Ret	Ret	Ret	10	6
16	(Canada) Jacques Villeneuve	9	DNS	6	Ret	Ret	12	Ret	Ret	Ret	9	10	9	Ret	6	Ret		6
17	(Spain) Marc Gené														5			4
18	(Japan) Takuma Sato																6	3
19	(Republic of Ireland) Ralph Firman	Ret	10	Ret	Ret	8	11	12	Ret	11	15	13	Ret	WD		Ret	14	1
20	(United Kingdom) Justin Wilson	Ret	Ret	Ret	Ret	11	13	Ret	Ret	13	14	16	Ret	Ret	Ret	8	13	1
21	(Brazil) Antônio Pizzonia	13^{†}	Ret	Ret	14	Ret	9	Ret	10^{†}	10	10	Ret						0
22	(Netherlands) Jos Verstappen	11	13	Ret	Ret	12	Ret	Ret	9	14	16	15	Ret	12	Ret	10	15	0
23	(Denmark) Nicolas Kiesa												12	13	12	11	16	0
24	(Hungary) Zsolt Baumgartner													Ret	11			0
Pos.	Driver	AUS (Australia)	MAL (Malaysia)	BRA (Brazil)	SMR (Italy)	ESP (Spain)	AUT (Austria)	MON (Monaco)	CAN (Canada)	EUR (Germany)	FRA (France)	GBR (United Kingdom)	GER (Germany)	HUN (Hungary)	ITA (Italy)	USA (United States)	JPN (Japan)	Points

Key
Colour	Result
Gold	Winner
Silver	Second place
Bronze	Third place
Green	Other points position
Blue	Other classified position
Blue	Not classified, finished (NC)
Purple	Not classified, retired (Ret)
Red	Did not qualify (DNQ)
Black	Disqualified (DSQ)
White	Did not start (DNS)
White	Race cancelled (C)
Blank	Did not practice (DNP)
Blank	Excluded (EX)
Blank	Did not arrive (DNA)
Blank	Withdrawn (WD)
Blank	Did not enter (empty cell)
Annotation	Meaning
P	Pole position
F	Fastest lap

Notes:

- † – Driver did not finish the Grand Prix but was classified, as he completed more than 90% of the race distance.

=== World Constructors' Championship standings ===
Pos.	Constructor	No.	AUS (Australia)	MAL (Malaysia)	BRA (Brazil)	SMR (Italy)	ESP (Spain)	AUT (Austria)	MON (Monaco)	CAN (Canada)	EUR (Germany)	FRA (France)	GBR (United Kingdom)	GER (Germany)	HUN (Hungary)	ITA (Italy)	USA (United States)	JPN (Japan)	Points
1	(Italy) Ferrari	1	4^{P}	6^{F}	Ret	1^{P}^{F}	1^{P}	1^{P}^{F}	3	1	5	3	4	7	8	1^{P}^{F}	1^{F}	8	158
1	(Italy) Ferrari	2	Ret	2	Ret^{P}^{F}	3	3^{F}	3	8	5	3	7	1^{P}^{F}	Ret	Ret	3	Ret	1^{P}	158
2	(United Kingdom) Williams-BMW	3	2	12	Ret	7	4	Ret	1	3	2	2^{F}	2	1^{P}^{F}	3^{F}	2	6	Ret	144
2	(United Kingdom) Williams-BMW	4	8	4	7	4	5	6	4^{P}	2^{P}	1	1^{P}	9	Ret	4	5	Ret	12^{F}	144
3	(United Kingdom) McLaren-Mercedes	5	1	Ret	4	5	Ret	5	7	Ret	15^{†}	5	5	2	5	Ret	Ret	3	142
3	(United Kingdom) McLaren-Mercedes	6	3^{F}	1	2	2	Ret	2	2^{F}	6	Ret^{P}^{F}	4	3	Ret	2	4	2^{P}	2	142
4	(France) Renault	7	5	5	8	13	Ret	8	6	Ret	Ret	Ret	6	3	7	Ret	4	5	88
4	(France) Renault	8	7	3^{P}	3	6	2	Ret	5	4^{F}	4	Ret	Ret	4	1^{P}	8	Ret	Ret	88
5	(United Kingdom) BAR-Honda	16	9	DNS	6	Ret	Ret	12	Ret	Ret	Ret	9	10	9	Ret	6	Ret	6	26
5	(United Kingdom) BAR-Honda	17	10	7	Ret	8	9	4	DNS	Ret	7	Ret	8	8	10	Ret	Ret	4	26
6	(Switzerland) Sauber-Petronas	9	Ret	8	Ret	10	10	Ret	11	Ret	8	13	17	10	9	9	5	9	19
6	(Switzerland) Sauber-Petronas	10	6	9	5	11	Ret	DNS	Ret	Ret	9	12	12	Ret	Ret	13^{†}	3	Ret	19
7	(United Kingdom) Jaguar-Cosworth	14	Ret	Ret	9^{†}	Ret	7	7	Ret	7	6	6	14	11^{†}	6	7	Ret	11	18
7	(United Kingdom) Jaguar-Cosworth	15	13^{†}	Ret	Ret	14	Ret	9	Ret	10^{†}	10	10	Ret	Ret	Ret	Ret	8	13	18
8	(Japan) Toyota	20	Ret	Ret	Ret	9	Ret	Ret	13	8	Ret	8	11	5	Ret	Ret	Ret	10	16
8	(Japan) Toyota	21	Ret	11	10	12	6	10	9	11^{†}	Ret	11	7	6	11	Ret	9	7	16
9	(Republic of Ireland) Jordan-Ford	11	12^{†}	Ret	1	15^{†}	Ret	Ret	10	Ret	12	Ret	Ret	13^{†}	Ret	10	7	Ret	13
9	(Republic of Ireland) Jordan-Ford	12	Ret	10	Ret	Ret	8	11	12	Ret	11	15	13	Ret	Ret	11	Ret	14	13
10	(Italy) Minardi-Cosworth	18	Ret	Ret	Ret	Ret	11	13	Ret	Ret	13	14	16	12	13	12	11	16	0
10	(Italy) Minardi-Cosworth	19	11	13	Ret	Ret	12	Ret	Ret	9	14	16	15	Ret	12	Ret	10	15	0
Pos.	Constructor	No.	AUS (Australia)	MAL (Malaysia)	BRA (Brazil)	SMR (Italy)	ESP (Spain)	AUT (Austria)	MON (Monaco)	CAN (Canada)	EUR (Germany)	FRA (France)	GBR (United Kingdom)	GER (Germany)	HUN (Hungary)	ITA (Italy)	USA (United States)	JPN (Japan)	Points

Notes:

- † – Driver did not finish the Grand Prix but was classified, as he completed more than 90% of the race distance.
