= 2003 San Marino Grand Prix =

Coordinates: 44°20′38″N 11°43′00″E

Race 4 of 16 in the 2003 Formula One World Championship
← Previous race	Next race →
- Autodromo Enzo e Dino Ferrari circuit configuration

Race details
- Date: April 20, 2003
- Official name: Gran Premio Foster's di San Marino 2003
- Location: Autodromo Enzo e Dino Ferrari, Imola, Emilia-Romagna, Italy
- Course: Permanent racing facility
- Course length: 4.933 km (3.065 miles)
- Distance: 62 laps, 305.609 km (189.897 miles)
- Weather: Mostly cloudy with maximum ambient temperatures reaching 13 degrees during the day.

Pole position
Driver	(Germany) Michael Schumacher	Ferrari
- Time: 1:22.327

Fastest lap
Driver	(Germany) Michael Schumacher	Ferrari
- Time: 1:22.491 on lap 17

Podium
First	(Germany) Michael Schumacher	Ferrari
Second	(Finland) Kimi Räikkönen	McLaren-Mercedes
Third	(Brazil) Rubens Barrichello	Ferrari

The 2003 San Marino Grand Prix (formally the Gran Premio Foster's di San Marino 2003) was a Formula One motor race held on 20 April 2003 at the Autodromo Enzo e Dino Ferrari, Imola, Emilia-Romagna, Italy, with the race taking place on Easter Sunday. It was the fourth round of the 2003 Formula One World Championship. The 62-lap race was won by Ferrari driver Michael Schumacher for the Ferrari team after starting from pole position. Kimi Räikkönen, driving for McLaren, finished second with Rubens Barrichello third in the other Ferrari. The remaining points-scoring positions were filled by Ralf Schumacher (Williams), David Coulthard (McLaren), Fernando Alonso (Renault), Juan Pablo Montoya (Williams) and Jenson Button (BAR). Schumacher's victory for Ferrari was his and the team's first of the season.

Schumacher and his brother Ralf raced despite the death of their mother Elisabeth before the Grand Prix. The brothers led the field at the start with Ralf leading having overtaken Michael and held the lead until the first round of pit stops.

As a consequence of the race, Räikkönen increased his lead in the World Drivers' Championship, over teammate David Coulthard to 13 points with Michael Schumacher moving to third. In the World Constructors Championship, McLaren increased their lead to 19 points with Ferrari overtaking Renault for second.

== Background ==
Heading into the fourth race of the season, McLaren driver Kimi Räikkönen was leading the World Drivers' Championship with 24 points, teammate David Coulthard was second on 15 points, 9 points behind Räikkönen. Behind Räikkönen and Coulthard in the Drivers' Championship, Fernando Alonso was third on 14 points in a Renault, with Giancarlo Fisichella and Jarno Trulli on 10 and 9 points respectively. In the World Constructors' Championship, McLaren were leading on 39 points and Renault were second on 23 points, with Ferrari on 16 points.

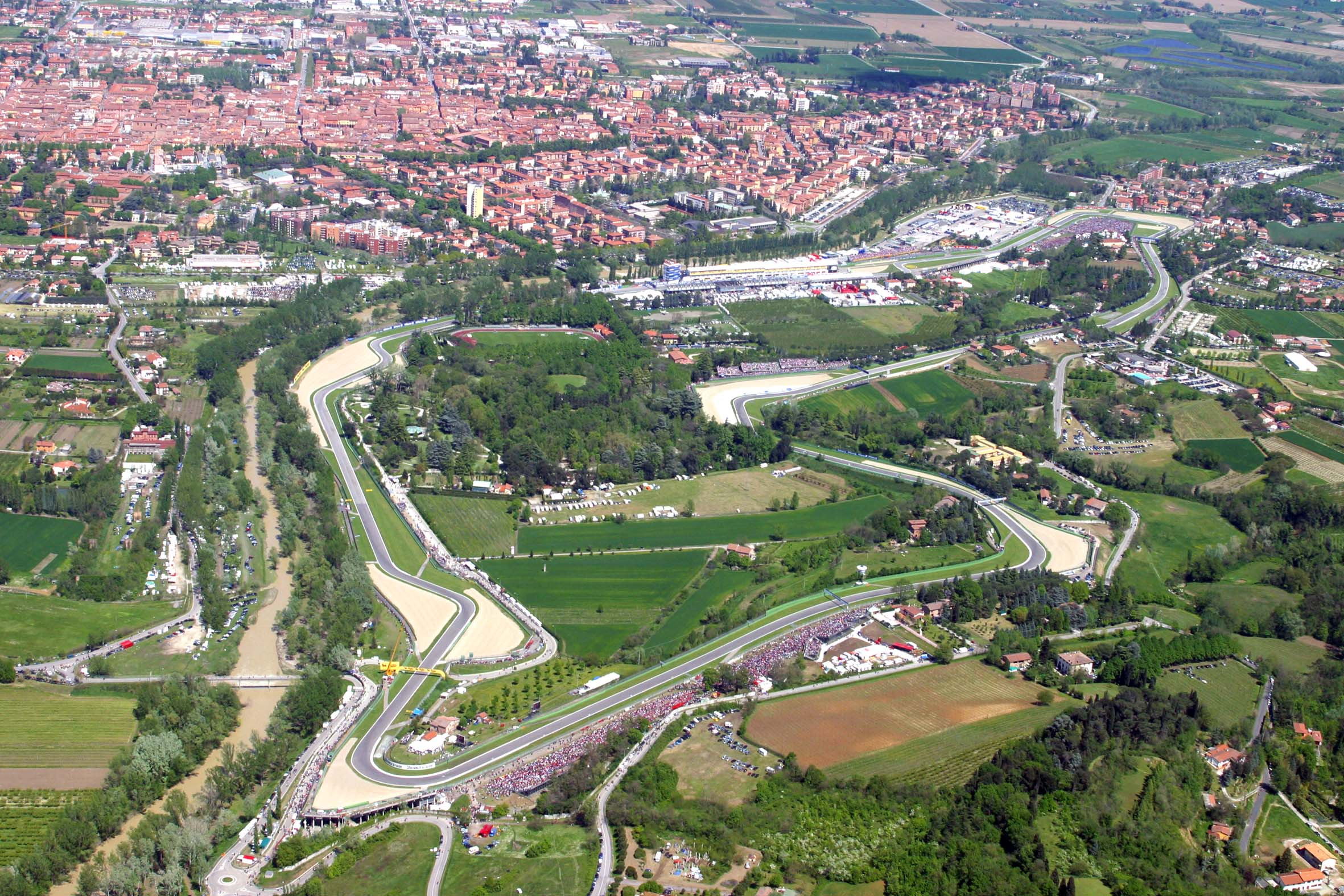
An aerial view of the Autodromo Enzo e Dino Ferrari.

At the preceding Brazilian Grand Prix, confusion caused by a red flag at the end of the race led to Räikkönen being declared the winner. An investigation by Formula One's governing body the FIA in the days following the race proved that Fisichella had been the actual victor. The investigation discovered that Fisichella started his 56th lap when the red flag was shown and the results were rolled back to 54 laps. Under the countback rule, the driver leading two laps before a race is stopped is declared the winner. During a meeting organised by the teams, the countback rule would be placed under review having highlighted potential problems. Fifteen minutes before the start of the first practice session, a ceremony was held in which Räikkönen and McLaren team principal Ron Dennis presented their winners' trophies to Fisichella and Jordan team principal Eddie Jordan, accompanied by the Italian national anthem (in honour to Fisichella) and by the Irish national anthem (in honour to Jordan).

Ferrari originally planned to debut its new car the F2003-GA at Imola. However, issues with reliability led to the decision to race the F2002. Ferrari stated the F2002 was still a competitive car and believed racing the F2003-GA would be "risky" despite testing the car at Mugello and Fiorano.

== Friday drivers ==
Three teams in the 2003 Constructors' Championship had the right to run a third car on Friday's additional testing. These drivers did not compete in qualifying or the race.

Constructor	Nat	Driver
Renault	(United Kingdom)	Allan McNish
Jordan-Ford		-
Minardi-Cosworth	(Italy)	Matteo Bobbi

== Practice ==
Three practice sessions were held before the race; the first was held from 11:00 to 12:00 local time on Friday, and two 45 minute timed sessions were also held on Saturday from 09:00 to 09:45 and 10:15 to 11:00 local time. The Qualifying session was run as a one-lap session and took place on Friday and Saturday afternoon. The cars were run one at a time; the Friday running order was determined with the Championship leading heading out first. The Saturday running order was determined by times set in Friday afternoon qualifying with the fastest heading out last and the slowest running first. The lap times from the Friday afternoon session did not determine the grid order.

Williams drivers Ralf Schumacher and Juan Pablo Montoya set the pace in the Friday free practice, which took place in dry and sunny conditions, with a time of 1:21.335. Montoya was less than sixth hundredths of a second behind, ahead of Jaguar driver Mark Webber, Coulthard, Alonso and BAR driver Jenson Button. Michael Schumacher clipped the kerb at the Variante Bassa chicane, damaging the Ferrari's left rear suspension.

== Qualifying ==
In the Saturday afternoon qualifying session, Schumacher clinched his second pole position of the season with a time of 1:22.327. He was joined on the front row by his brother Ralf Schumacher, who was 14 thousands of a seconds behind. Rubens Barrichello was third in the other Ferrari, with Montoya fourth. Webber took fifth, with Räikkönen taking sixth. Minardi driver Jos Verstappen crashed into the wall at the Variane Alta chicane becoming the first driver to not set a competitive lap time under the new qualifying format.

=== Qualifying classification ===
Pos	No	Driver	Constructor	Q1 Time	Q2 Time	Gap	Grid
1	1	(Germany) Michael Schumacher	Ferrari	1:20.628	1:22.327		1
2	4	(Germany) Ralf Schumacher	Williams-BMW	1:21.193	1:22.341	+0.014	2
3	2	(Brazil) Rubens Barrichello	Ferrari	1:21.082	1:22.557	+0.230	3
4	3	(Colombia) Juan Pablo Montoya	Williams-BMW	1:21.490	1:22.789	+0.462	4
5	14	(Australia) Mark Webber	Jaguar-Cosworth	1:21.669	1:23.015	+0.688	5
6	6	(Finland) Kimi Räikkönen	McLaren-Mercedes	1:22.147	1:23.148	+0.821	6
7	16	(Canada) Jacques Villeneuve	BAR-Honda	1:21.926	1:23.160	+0.833	7
8	8	(Spain) Fernando Alonso	Renault	1:22.809	1:23.169	+0.842	8
9	17	(United Kingdom) Jenson Button	BAR-Honda	1:21.891	1:23.381	+1.054	9
10	20	(France) Olivier Panis	Toyota	1:22.765	1:23.460	+1.133	10
11	9	(Germany) Nick Heidfeld	Sauber-Petronas	1:22.911	1:23.700	+1.373	11
12	5	(United Kingdom) David Coulthard	McLaren-Mercedes	1:22.326	1:23.818	+1.491	12
13	21	(Brazil) Cristiano da Matta	Toyota	1:24.854	1:23.838	+1.511	13
14	10	(Germany) Heinz-Harald Frentzen	Sauber-Petronas	1:22.531	1:23.932	+1.605	14
15	15	(Brazil) Antônio Pizzonia	Jaguar-Cosworth	1:22.919	1:24.147	+1.820	15
16	7	(Italy) Jarno Trulli	Renault	1:23.100	1:24.190	+1.863	16
17	11	(Italy) Giancarlo Fisichella	Jordan-Ford	1:22.724	1:24.317	+1.990	17
18	18	(United Kingdom) Justin Wilson	Minardi-Cosworth	1:25.195	1:25.826	+3.499	18
19	12	(Republic of Ireland) Ralph Firman	Jordan-Ford	1:24.360	1:26.357	+4.030	19
20	19	(Netherlands) Jos Verstappen	Minardi-Cosworth	1:24.990	2:01.007	+38.680	20

== Race ==
The race took place in the afternoon and started at 14:00 local time, in dry and clear weather. As usual, the race was broadcast worldwide, with the "World Feed" coverage being produced by host broadcaster RAI. Michael Schumacher, from pole position on the grid, lost the lead from Ralf Schumacher before the first corner. Webber, from fifth, made a poor start dropping down to eleventh. Räikkonen managed to gain one position for fifth with teammate Coulthard making the best start and gained four places to go into eighth position. Webber's teammate Antônio Pizzonia stalled on the grid. Trackside marshals pushed Pizzonia's car to the exit of the pitlane where Jaguar mechanics managed to restart the car's engine enabling Pizzonia rejoin at the back of the field.

=== Post-race ===
Ralf and Michael Schumacher raced despite the death of their mother Elisabeth just hours before the race with the pair flying on a private jet to Cologne to be at her side. They sported black armbands and no champagne was sprayed on the podium as a mark of respect. Ralf also sported a black stripe on his racing helmet. The Schumacher brothers left the circuit immediately after the podium celebrations and Ferrari team principal Jean Todt took Michael's place at the post-race press conference. Race stewards Tony Scott-Andrews, Roger Peart and Giuseppe Musiconi formally excused the Schumacher brothers from the pre and post-race formalities.

At the subsequent post-race press conference, Todt revealed that Schumacher made the decision to compete in the Grand Prix with Ferrari giving their full support to Schumacher. Mercedes motorsport vice-president Norbert Haug expressed sympathy for the Schumacher brothers while also praising them for their performance during the race.

As a consequence of the race, Räikkönen increased his lead in the World Drivers' Championship, over teammate David Coulthard to 13 points with Schumacher climbing to third. In the World Constructors Championship, McLaren increased their lead to 16 points with Ferrari overtaking Renault for second.

=== Race classification ===
Pos	No	Driver	Constructor	Tyre	Laps	Time/Retired	Grid	Points
1	1	(Germany) Michael Schumacher	Ferrari	B	62	1:28:12.058	1	10
2	6	(Finland) Kimi Räikkönen	McLaren-Mercedes	M	62	+1.882	6	8
3	2	(Brazil) Rubens Barrichello	Ferrari	B	62	+2.291	3	6
4	4	(Germany) Ralf Schumacher	Williams-BMW	M	62	+8.803	2	5
5	5	(United Kingdom) David Coulthard	McLaren-Mercedes	M	62	+9.411	12	4
6	8	(Spain) Fernando Alonso	Renault	M	62	+43.689	8	3
7	3	(Colombia) Juan Pablo Montoya	Williams-BMW	M	62	+45.271	4	2
8	17	(United Kingdom) Jenson Button	BAR-Honda	B	61	+1 Lap	9	1
9	20	(France) Olivier Panis	Toyota	M	61	+1 Lap	10	
10	9	(Germany) Nick Heidfeld	Sauber-Petronas	B	61	+1 Lap	11	
11	10	(Germany) Heinz-Harald Frentzen	Sauber-Petronas	B	61	+1 Lap	14	
12	21	(Brazil) Cristiano da Matta	Toyota	M	61	+1 Lap	13	
13	7	(Italy) Jarno Trulli	Renault	M	61	+1 Lap	16	
14	15	(Brazil) Antônio Pizzonia	Jaguar-Cosworth	M	60	+2 Laps	15	
15	11	(Italy) Giancarlo Fisichella	Jordan-Ford	B	57	Engine	17	
Ret	14	(Australia) Mark Webber	Jaguar-Cosworth	M	54	Driveshaft	5	
Ret	12	(Republic of Ireland) Ralph Firman	Jordan-Ford	B	51	Oil line	PL^{1}	
Ret	19	(Netherlands) Jos Verstappen	Minardi-Cosworth	B	38	Electrical	PL^{1}	
Ret	18	(United Kingdom) Justin Wilson	Minardi-Cosworth	B	23	Fuel rig	PL^{1}	
Ret	16	(Canada) Jacques Villeneuve	BAR-Honda	B	19	Engine	7	

Notes

- ^1 – Ralph Firman and Jos Verstappen and Justin Wilson started the race from the pitlane.

== Championship standings after the race ==
Drivers' Championship standings

+/–	Pos	Driver	Points
	1	(Finland) Kimi Räikkönen	32
	2	(United Kingdom) David Coulthard	19
5	3	(Germany) Michael Schumacher	18
1	4	(Spain) Fernando Alonso	17
2	5	(Brazil) Rubens Barrichello	14

Constructors' Championship standings

+/–	Pos	Constructor	Points
	1	(United Kingdom) McLaren-Mercedes	51
1	2	(Italy) Ferrari	32
1	3	(France) Renault	26
	4	(United Kingdom) Williams-BMW	23
	5	(Republic of Ireland) Jordan-Ford	10

- Note: Only the top five positions are included for both sets of standings.

Previous race: 2003 Brazilian Grand Prix	FIA Formula One World Championship; 2003 season	Next race: 2003 Spanish Grand Prix
Previous race: 2002 San Marino Grand Prix	San Marino Grand Prix	Next race: 2004 San Marino Grand Prix
