= 2003 Spanish Grand Prix =

Coordinates: 41°34′12″N 2°15′40″E

Race 5 of 16 in the 2003 Formula One World Championship
← Previous race	Next race →

Race details
- Date: 4 May 2003
- Official name: Gran Premio Marlboro de España 2003
- Location: Circuit de Catalunya, Montmeló, Catalonia, Spain
- Course: Permanent racing facility
- Course length: 4.730 km (2.939 miles)
- Distance: 65 laps, 307.324 km (190.962 miles)
- Weather: Clear. Track temperature: 35°C
- Attendance: 96,000

Pole position
Driver	(Germany) Michael Schumacher	Ferrari
- Time: 1:17.762

Fastest lap
Driver	(Brazil) Rubens Barrichello	Ferrari
- Time: 1:20.143 on lap 52

Podium
First	(Germany) Michael Schumacher	Ferrari
Second	(Spain) Fernando Alonso	Renault
Third	(Brazil) Rubens Barrichello	Ferrari

The 2003 Spanish Grand Prix (officially known as the Gran Premio Marlboro de España 2003) was a Formula One motor race that took place on 4 May 2003 at the Circuit de Catalunya in Montmeló, Spain. It was the fifth round of the 2003 Formula One World Championship.

Michael Schumacher of Scuderia Ferrari took pole position for the race and went on to win it, ahead of Fernando Alonso of Renault and teammate Rubens Barrichello. Ralph Firman scored his only career point by finishing eighth.

== Background ==
The Circuit de Catalunya in Montmeló hosted the Spanish Grand Prix for the thirteenth time in the circuit's history, across the weekend of 2–4 May. The Grand Prix was the fifth round of the 2003 Formula One World Championship and the 33rd running of the Spanish Grand Prix as a round of the Formula One World Championship.

=== Championship standings before the race ===
Going into the weekend, Kimi Räikkönen led the Drivers' Championship with 32 points, 13 points ahead of his teammate David Coulthard in second and 14 ahead of Michael Schumacher in third. McLaren-Mercedes, with 51 points, led the Constructors' Championship from Ferrari and Renault, who were second and third with 32 and 26 points, respectively.

=== Updated Ferrari ===
Ferrari debuted their new car, the F2003-GA, at this race. "GA" was added to the car's name as a tribute to Gianni Agnelli, head of Fiat, who died shortly before the car's unveiling.

== Practice ==
Three free practice sessions were held for the event. The first session on Friday was topped by Ralf Schumacher in the BMW Williams, ahead of the Renaults of Jarno Trulli and Fernando Alonso. First Saturday practice was led by championship leader Kimi Räikkönen, ahead of Antônio Pizzonia in the Jaguar and Rubens Barrichello in the Ferrari. Alonso then topped the final practice session, ahead of Rubens Barrichello in the Ferrari and Trulli in third.

== Qualifying ==
Qualiyfing consisted of two one-hour sessions, one on Friday and one on Saturday afternoons. The first session's running order was determined by the Drivers' Championship standings, with the leading driver going first. Each driver was allowed to set one lap time. The result determined the running order in the second session: the fastest driver in the first session was allowed to go last in the second session, which usually provided the benefit of a cleaner track. Drivers were again allowed to set one lap time, which determined the order on the grid for the race on Sunday, with the fastest driver scoring pole position.

Pos	No	Driver	Constructor	Q1 time	Q2 time	Gap	Grid
1	1	(Germany) Michael Schumacher	Ferrari	1:17.130	1:17.762		1
2	2	(Brazil) Rubens Barrichello	Ferrari	1:17.218	1:18.020	+0.258	2
3	8	(Spain) Fernando Alonso	Renault	1:18.100	1:18.233	+0.471	3
4	7	(Italy) Jarno Trulli	Renault	1:17.149	1:18.615	+0.853	4
5	17	(United Kingdom) Jenson Button	BAR-Honda	1:17.613	1:18.704	+0.942	5
6	20	(France) Olivier Panis	Toyota	1:17.746	1:18.881	+1.049	6
7	4	(Germany) Ralf Schumacher	Williams-BMW	1:18.409	1:19.006	+1.244	7
8	5	(United Kingdom) David Coulthard	McLaren-Mercedes	1:18.060	1:19.128	+1.366	8
9	3	(Colombia) Juan Pablo Montoya	Williams-BMW	1:18.607	1:19.377	+1.615	9
10	10	(Germany) Heinz-Harald Frentzen	Sauber-Petronas	1:18.909	1:19.427	+1.665	10
11	16	(Canada) Jacques Villeneuve	BAR-Honda	1:18.461	1:19.563	+1.801	11
12	14	(Australia) Mark Webber	Jaguar-Cosworth	1:17.793	1:19.615	+1.853	12
13	21	(Brazil) Cristiano da Matta	Toyota	1:17.443	1:19.623	+1.861	13
14	9	(Germany) Nick Heidfeld	Sauber-Petronas	1:19.050	1:19.646	+1.884	14
15	12	(Republic of Ireland) Ralph Firman	Jordan-Ford	1:19.195	1:20.215	+2.453	15
16	15	(Brazil) Antônio Pizzonia	Jaguar-Cosworth	1:18.528	1:20.308	+2.546	16
17	11	(Italy) Giancarlo Fisichella	Jordan-Ford	1:18.879	1:20.976	+3.214	17
18	18	(United Kingdom) Justin Wilson	Minardi-Cosworth	1:21.100	1:22.104	+4.342	18
19	19	(Netherlands) Jos Verstappen	Minardi-Cosworth	1:20.822	1:22.237	+4.475	19
20	6	(Finland) Kimi Räikkönen	McLaren-Mercedes	1:17.862	No time^{1}		20

Notes

- ^1 - Kimi Räikkönen did not set a time in the second session after he went off the circuit in turn seven.

== Race ==
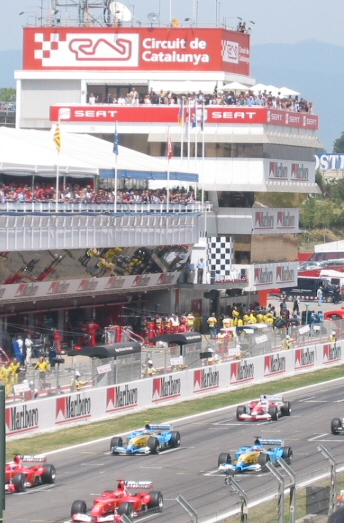
The start of the 2003 Spanish Grand Prix

The race was held on 4 May 2003 and was run for 65 laps.

=== Race report ===
At the start, third-starting Fernando Alonso was the fastest off the line, quickly overtaking Rubens Barrichello and pressuring Michael Schumacher, but coming to the first corner, Barrichello saw a chance round the outside. He re-overtook Alonso, while putting two wheels on the dirt to avoid clashing with his teammate. Jarno Trulli started fourth but fell back and was fighting with David Coulthard when the two touched in the first corner, leading to the Italian's immediate retirement and the Scot's need for an unscheduled pit stop. Looking back at the grid, Antônio Pizzonia had stalled his Jaguar and, while Justin Wilson had been able to avoid him, not so for championship leader Kimi Räikkönen. Both drivers retired with terminal damage.

After five laps behind the safety car, the race resumed and the top runners slowly spread out, but Alonso did manage to jump Barrichello during the first round of pit stops. Meanwhile, Coulthard had his second accident, this time with Jenson Button. The McLaren was now too damaged to continue and Button had to change his front wing.

All through the second half of the race and the final round of stops, Alonso kept pressuring Schumacher, reducing the gap to less than six seconds, but the German led his updated Ferrari to the win. Alonso became the first Spanish driver to score points at his home race. Behind Barrichello and both Williamses, Cristiano da Matta finished in sixth position to score his first points in Formula One, as did Ralph Firman, who finished in eighth position. Mark Webber in seventh scored his first points since his debut weekend more than a year ago.

=== Post-race ===
McLaren's first double failure to finish since the 2002 Malaysian Grand Prix saw Michael Schumacher elevated to second in the World Drivers' Championship, closing the gap to leader Räikkönen to four points, whilst Ferrari narrowed their disadvantage to McLaren to just three points. Alonso and Barrichello also moved up one place, while Coulthard was demoted from second to fifth.

=== Race classification ===
Pos	No	Driver	Constructor	Tyre	Laps	Time/Retired	Grid	Points
1	1	(Germany) Michael Schumacher	Ferrari	B	65	1:33:46.933	1	10
2	8	(Spain) Fernando Alonso	Renault	M	65	+5.716	3	8
3	2	(Brazil) Rubens Barrichello	Ferrari	B	65	+18.001	2	6
4	3	(Colombia) Juan Pablo Montoya	Williams-BMW	M	65	+1:02.022	9	5
5	4	(Germany) Ralf Schumacher	Williams-BMW	M	64	+1 lap	7	4
6	21	(Brazil) Cristiano da Matta	Toyota	M	64	+1 lap	13	3
7	14	(Australia) Mark Webber	Jaguar-Cosworth	M	64	+1 lap	12	2
8	12	(Republic of Ireland) Ralph Firman	Jordan-Ford	B	63	+2 laps	15	1
9	17	(United Kingdom) Jenson Button	BAR-Honda	B	63	+2 laps	5	
10	9	(Germany) Nick Heidfeld	Sauber-Petronas	B	63	+2 laps	14	
11	18	(United Kingdom) Justin Wilson	Minardi-Cosworth	B	63	+2 laps	18	
12	19	(Netherlands) Jos Verstappen	Minardi-Cosworth	B	62	+3 laps	19	
Ret	11	(Italy) Giancarlo Fisichella	Jordan-Ford	B	43	Engine	17	
Ret	20	(France) Olivier Panis	Toyota	M	41	Gearbox	6	
Ret	10	(Germany) Heinz-Harald Frentzen	Sauber-Petronas	B	38	Suspension	10	
Ret	5	(United Kingdom) David Coulthard	McLaren-Mercedes	M	17	Collision	8	
Ret	16	(Canada) Jacques Villeneuve	BAR-Honda	B	12	Electrical	11	
Ret	7	(Italy) Jarno Trulli	Renault	M	0	Collision	4	
Ret	15	(Brazil) Antônio Pizzonia	Jaguar-Cosworth	M	0	Launch control / collision	16	
Ret	6	(Finland) Kimi Räikkönen	McLaren-Mercedes	M	0	Collision	20	

== Championship standings after the race ==
Drivers' Championship standings

+/–	Pos	Driver	Points
	1	(Finland) Kimi Räikkönen	32
1	2	(Germany) Michael Schumacher	28
1	3	(Spain) Fernando Alonso	25
1	4	(Brazil) Rubens Barrichello	20
3	5	(United Kingdom) David Coulthard	19

Constructors' Championship standings

+/–	Pos	Constructor	Points
	1	(United Kingdom) McLaren-Mercedes	51
	2	(Italy) Ferrari	48
	3	(France) Renault	34
	4	(United Kingdom) Williams-BMW	32
	5	(Republic of Ireland) Jordan-Ford	11

- Note: Only the top five positions are included for both sets of standings.

Previous race: 2003 San Marino Grand Prix	FIA Formula One World Championship; 2003 season	Next race: 2003 Austrian Grand Prix
Previous race: 2002 Spanish Grand Prix	Spanish Grand Prix	Next race: 2004 Spanish Grand Prix
Awards
Preceded by 2002 Hungarian Grand Prix	Formula One Promotional Trophy for Race Promoter; 2003	Succeeded by 2004 Bahrain Grand Prix
