= 2003 European Grand Prix =

Coordinates: 50°20′08″N 6°56′51″E

Race 9 of 16 in the 2003 Formula One World Championship
← Previous race	Next race →
- The Nürburgring

Race details
- Date: 29 June 2003
- Official name: 2003 Allianz Grand Prix of Europe
- Location: Nürburgring, Nürburg, Germany
- Course: Permanent racing facility
- Course length: 5.148 km (3.2 miles)
- Distance: 60 laps, 308.88 km (192 miles)
- Weather: Mostly cloudy with maximum ambient temperatures reaching 25 degrees celsius during the day.
- Attendance: 123,000

Pole position
Driver	(Finland) Kimi Räikkönen	McLaren-Mercedes
- Time: 1:31.523

Fastest lap
Driver	(Finland) Kimi Räikkönen	McLaren-Mercedes
- Time: 1:32.621 on lap 14

Podium
First	(Germany) Ralf Schumacher	Williams-BMW
Second	(Colombia) Juan Pablo Montoya	Williams-BMW
Third	(Brazil) Rubens Barrichello	Ferrari

The 2003 European Grand Prix (formally the 2003 Allianz Grand Prix of Europe) was a Formula One motor race held on 29 June 2003 at the Nürburgring, Nürburg, Germany. It was the ninth race of the 2003 Formula One season. The 60-lap race was won Ralf Schumacher driving in a Williams car. Juan Pablo Montoya, also driving for Williams finished second, with Rubens Barrichello third in a Ferrari.

== Race report ==
Approximately 123,000 people attended the race. For 25 laps of the European Grand Prix, Kimi Räikkönen looked set to win from his first pole position and regain his championship lead. Then his McLaren’s Mercedes engine broke down and instead it was Ralf Schumacher who came through to score his first win of the year.

Having taken pole, Räikkönen soon built a lead over Ralf Schumacher. He was nine seconds clear when he made his first refuelling stop on the 16th lap, with Michael Schumacher another ten seconds further back. Ralf led briefly for Williams and ran until lap 21 before pitting, but this was still insufficient to keep Räikkönen out of the lead. Ralf Schumacher was still 4.8 seconds behind when Räikkönen's Mercedes engine blew up, making him the first retirement of the race.

On the 43rd lap Juan Pablo Montoya and Michael Schumacher collided while fighting for second place. Montoya had gradually reeled in Schumacher until they were side-by-side on the rundown to the Dunlop Kurve. Schumacher ran up the kerb and tagged Montoya’s Williams as it passed the German's Ferrari for second place. As Schumacher spun and sat stranded, his Ferrari’s rear wheels spinning in the gravel, Montoya continued. By the time three marshals and fireman pushed the Ferrari from its dangerous spot on the corner’s apex, Schumacher was down to sixth.

“Michael was quick on the straights, but in the corners he was very slow,” said Montoya. “He was on the inside and I was on the outside. I thought I gave him plenty of room. I wasn’t going to give him all the track, but I thought it was all right.”

Schumacher agreed that Montoya had given him enough room and after a stewards’ enquiry, no action was taken. Ferrari’s Ross Brawn was not content with the situation, but Williams technical director Patrick Head remarked that, had Montoya been penalised, it would effectively have been a declaration that overtaking was no longer allowed in Formula One racing.

Then, on the 57th lap, McLaren's David Coulthard suddenly had to swerve around Fernando Alonso approaching the chicane, and spun into retirement. “Alonso braked ten metres earlier than he had the lap before,” said Coulthard. “He was dealing inconsistently with problems, as his rear tyres looked completely worn out. But I just got caught out.” The Spaniard continued, and was very nearly caught on the final lap by the recovering world champion. The stewards investigated the incident after a report was filed to them by the FIA race director Charlie Whiting. They spoke to both Alonso and Coulthard and members of their respective teams. After a review of telemetry and video data, no driver was imposed a penalty.

== Classification ==
=== Qualifying ===
Pos	No	Driver	Constructor	Q1 Time	Q2 Time	Gap	Grid
1	6	(Finland) Kimi Räikkönen	McLaren-Mercedes	1:29.989	1:31.523		1
2	1	(Germany) Michael Schumacher	Ferrari	1:30.353	1:31.555	+0.032	2
3	4	(Germany) Ralf Schumacher	Williams-BMW	1:30.522	1:31.619	+0.096	3
4	3	(Colombia) Juan Pablo Montoya	Williams-BMW	1:30.378	1:31.765	+0.242	4
5	2	(Brazil) Rubens Barrichello	Ferrari	1:30.842	1:31.780	+0.257	5
6	7	(Italy) Jarno Trulli	Renault	1:31.143	1:31.976	+0.453	6
7	20	(France) Olivier Panis	Toyota	1:57.327	1:32.350	+0.827	7
8	8	(Spain) Fernando Alonso	Renault	1:31.533	1:32.424	+0.901	8
9	5	(United Kingdom) David Coulthard	McLaren-Mercedes	1:30.903	1:32.742	+1.219	9
10	21	(Brazil) Cristiano da Matta	Toyota	No time^{1}	1:32.949	+1.426	10
11	14	(Australia) Mark Webber	Jaguar-Cosworth	1:35.972	1:33.066	+1.543	11
12	17	(United Kingdom) Jenson Button	BAR-Honda	1:32.479	1:33.395	+1.872	12
13	11	(Italy) Giancarlo Fisichella	Jordan-Ford	1:32.196	1:33.553	+2.030	13
14	12	(Republic of Ireland) Ralph Firman	Jordan-Ford	1:53.893	1:33.827	+2.304	14
15	10	(Germany) Heinz-Harald Frentzen	Sauber-Petronas	1:32.201	1:34.000	+2.477	15
16	15	(Brazil) Antônio Pizzonia	Jaguar-Cosworth	1:57.435	1:34.159	+2.636	16
17	16	(Canada) Jacques Villeneuve	BAR-Honda	No time^{2}	1:34.596	+3.073	17
18	19	(Netherlands) Jos Verstappen	Minardi-Cosworth	1:55.921	1:36.318	+4.795	18
19	18	(United Kingdom) Justin Wilson	Minardi-Cosworth	1:54.546	1:36.485	+4.962	19
20	9	(Germany) Nick Heidfeld	Sauber-Petronas	1:52.300	No time^{3}		20

Notes

- ^1 – Cristiano da Matta was left without time in Q1 after spinning off the track and abandoning the attempt.
- ^2 – Jacques Villeneuve was left without a time in Q1 after driving off the track.
- ^3 – Nick Heidfeld was left without a time in Q2 after spinning in the first corner.

=== Race ===
Pos	No	Driver	Constructor	Tyre	Laps	Time/Retired	Grid	Points
1	4	(Germany) Ralf Schumacher	Williams-BMW	M	60	1:34:43.622	3	10
2	3	(Colombia) Juan Pablo Montoya	Williams-BMW	M	60	+16.821	4	8
3	2	(Brazil) Rubens Barrichello	Ferrari	B	60	+39.673	5	6
4	8	(Spain) Fernando Alonso	Renault	M	60	+1:05.731	8	5
5	1	(Germany) Michael Schumacher	Ferrari	B	60	+1:06.162	2	4
6	14	(Australia) Mark Webber	Jaguar-Cosworth	M	59	+1 Lap	11	3
7	17	(United Kingdom) Jenson Button	BAR-Honda	B	59	+1 Lap	12	2
8	9	(Germany) Nick Heidfeld	Sauber-Petronas	B	59	+1 Lap	PL^{4}	1
9	10	(Germany) Heinz-Harald Frentzen	Sauber-Petronas	B	59	+1 Lap	15	
10	15	(Brazil) Antônio Pizzonia	Jaguar-Cosworth	M	59	+1 Lap	16	
11	12	(Republic of Ireland) Ralph Firman	Jordan-Ford	B	58	+2 Laps	14	
12	11	(Italy) Giancarlo Fisichella	Jordan-Ford	B	58	+2 Laps	13	
13	18	(United Kingdom) Justin Wilson	Minardi-Cosworth	B	58	+2 Laps	19	
14	19	(Netherlands) Jos Verstappen	Minardi-Cosworth	B	57	+3 Laps	18	
15	5	(United Kingdom) David Coulthard	McLaren-Mercedes	M	56	Spun off	9	
Ret	21	(Brazil) Cristiano da Matta	Toyota	M	53	Engine	10	
Ret	16	(Canada) Jacques Villeneuve	BAR-Honda	B	51	Gearbox	17	
Ret	7	(Italy) Jarno Trulli	Renault	M	37	Fuel pressure	6	
Ret	20	(France) Olivier Panis	Toyota	M	37	Brakes	7	
Ret	6	(Finland) Kimi Räikkönen	McLaren-Mercedes	M	25	Engine	1	

Notes

- ^4 – Nick Heidfeld started the race from the pitlane.

== Championship standings after the race ==
It was the first time this season that the top two in the World Championship would fail to score a podium in the same race. However, Michael Schumacher was still able to increase his points advantage towards Räikkönen to seven points following the latter's retirement. Both Ralf Schumacher and Montoya were able to leapfrog Alonso in the standings by advancing one position each, trailing championship leader Michael Schumacher by fifteen and nineteen points, respectively. Williams’ haul of points from a race in which McLaren went home with none moved them up into second place in the constructors’ championship. Sir Frank Williams was careful to play down talk of a championship challenge for his team. But with Ferrari only 13 points ahead, everyone within the team believed that they had a chance of challenging before the season was over.

Drivers' Championship standings

+/–	Pos	Driver	Points
	1	(Germany) Michael Schumacher	58
	2	(Finland) Kimi Räikkönen	51
1	3	(Germany) Ralf Schumacher	43
1	4	(Colombia) Juan Pablo Montoya	39
2	5	(Spain) Fernando Alonso	39

Constructors' Championship standings

+/–	Pos	Constructor	Points
	1	(Italy) Ferrari	95
1	2	(United Kingdom) Williams-BMW	82
1	3	(United Kingdom) McLaren-Mercedes	76
	4	(France) Renault	52
1	5	(United Kingdom) BAR-Honda	13

- Note: Only the top five positions are included for both sets of standings.

Previous race: 2003 Canadian Grand Prix	FIA Formula One World Championship; 2003 season	Next race: 2003 French Grand Prix
Previous race: 2002 European Grand Prix	European Grand Prix	Next race: 2004 European Grand Prix
