= 2003 French Grand Prix =

Coordinates: 46°51′51″N 3°09′49″E

Race 10 of 16 in the 2003 Formula One World Championship
← Previous race	Next race →

Race details
- Date: 6 July 2003
- Official name: Mobil 1 Grand Prix de France 2003
- Location: Magny-Cours, France
- Course: Permanent racing facility
- Course length: 4.411 km (2.741 miles)
- Distance: 70 laps, 308.586 km (191.746 miles)
- Weather: Cloudy, Air: 26 °C (79 °F), Track 35 °C (95 °F)
- Attendance: 101,537

Pole position
Driver	(Germany) Ralf Schumacher	Williams-BMW
- Time: 1:15.019

Fastest lap
Driver	(Colombia) Juan Pablo Montoya	Williams-BMW
- Time: 1:15.512 on lap 36

Podium
First	(Germany) Ralf Schumacher	Williams-BMW
Second	(Colombia) Juan Pablo Montoya	Williams-BMW
Third	(Germany) Michael Schumacher	Ferrari

The 2003 French Grand Prix (officially known as the Mobil 1 Grand Prix de France 2003) was a Formula One motor race that took place on 6 July 2003 at the Circuit de Nevers Magny-Cours. It was the tenth round of the 2003 Formula One World Championship.

Ralf Schumacher of BMW Williams took pole position for the race and went on to take the race win. His teammate Juan Pablo Montoya finished second and his brother Michael Schumacher, driving for Ferrari, was third.

This was Ralf's second consecutive victory but it would turn out to be his last in Formula One. As of 2025, this is also the last 1–2 finish for Williams.

== Background ==
The event was held at the Circuit de Nevers Magny-Cours in Magny-Cours, France for the 13th time in the circuit's history, across the weekend of 4–6 July 2003. The Grand Prix was the tenth round of the 2003 Formula One World Championship and the 53rd running of the French Grand Prix as a round of the Formula One World Championship.

=== Circuit changes ===
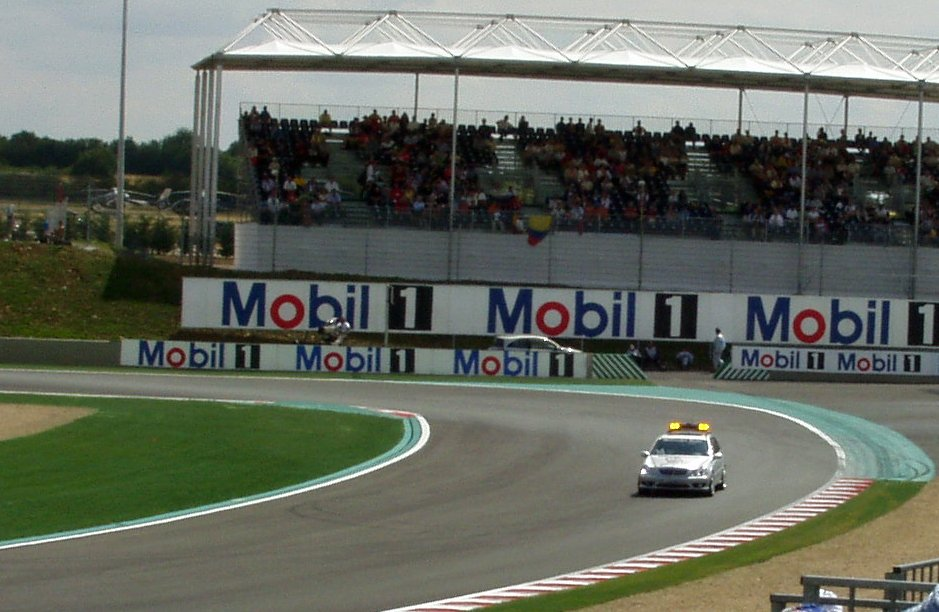
The Lycée section of the circuit was modified ahead of the 2003 event.

Earlier in the year, the circuit was upgraded. Château d'Eau a sharper right hand corner and the Lycée section were completely modified, now featuring a sharp right hand turn after the back straight, which then leads to a difficult final chicane next to the pit entrance. The pit lane was significantly shortened as a result of the upgrades.

=== Championship standings before the race ===
Going into the weekend, Michael Schumacher led the Drivers' Championship with 58 points, seven points ahead of Kimi Räikkönen in second and fifteen ahead of his brother Ralf Schumacher in third. Ferrari, with 95 points, led the Constructors' Championship from BMW Williams and McLaren, who were second and third with 82 and 76, respectively.

== Practice ==
Three free practice sessions were held for the event. Jaguar driver Mark Webber set the fastest time in the first session, more than a second quicker than Ralf Schumacher and Fernando Alonso, in second and third places respectively. The second session was topped by Alonso in the Renault ahead of Rubens Barrichello and Ralf Schumacher. Finally, the Williamses of Ralf Schumacher and Juan-Pablo Montoya led the third practice session, ahead of David Coulthard in third.

== Qualifying ==
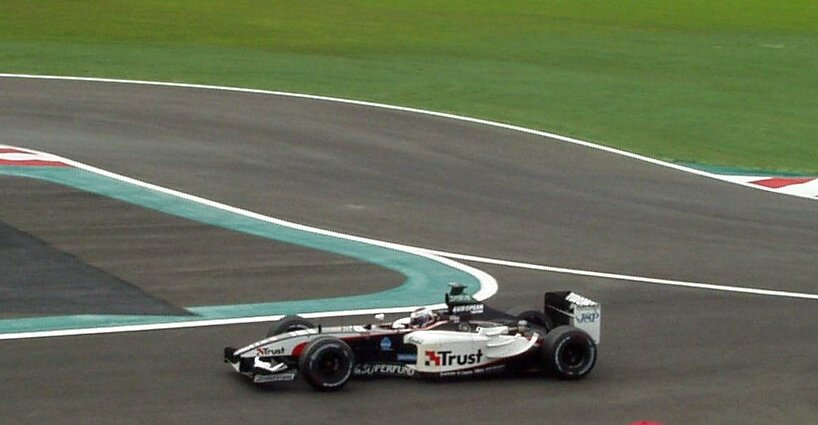
Jos Verstappen set the fastest time in Friday qualifying.

Qualiyfing consisted of two one-hour sessions, one on Friday and one on Saturday afternoon. The first session's running order was determined by the Drivers' Championship standings, with the leading driver going first. Each driver was allowed to set one lap time. The result determined the running order in the second session: the fastest driver in the first session was allowed to go last in the second session, which usually provided the benefit of a cleaner track. Drivers were again allowed to set one lap time, which determined the order on the grid for the race on Sunday, with the fastest driver scoring pole position.

=== Qualifying report ===
Courtesy of a drying track, Jos Verstappen ended up quickest in the first qualifying session, almost three seconds ahead of anyone else. This was the only time a Minardi topped the timesheets at a race weekend. His teammate Justin Wilson had set the second-fastest time but it was deleted after scrutineering found his car was 2.5 kg (5.5 lb) underweight.

Normal service resumed in second qualifying on a dry track, in which Williams teammates Ralf Schumacher and Juan-Pablo Montoya clinched the first row on the grid. It was Schumacher's third pole position in four races.

=== Qualifying classification ===
Pos	No	Driver	Constructor	Q1 Time	Q2 Time	Gap	Grid
1	4	(Germany) Ralf Schumacher	Williams-BMW	1:29.327	1:15.019		1
2	3	(Colombia) Juan Pablo Montoya	Williams-BMW	1:28.988	1:15.136	+0.117	2
3	1	(Germany) Michael Schumacher	Ferrari	1:27.929	1:15.480	+0.461	3
4	6	(Finland) Kimi Räikkönen	McLaren-Mercedes	1:29.120	1:15.533	+0.514	4
5	5	(United Kingdom) David Coulthard	McLaren-Mercedes	1:28.937	1:15.628	+0.609	5
6	7	(Italy) Jarno Trulli	Renault	1:29.024	1:15.967	+0.948	6
7	8	(Spain) Fernando Alonso	Renault	1:29.455	1:16.087	+1.068	7
8	2	(Brazil) Rubens Barrichello	Ferrari	1:27.095	1:16.166	+1.147	8
9	14	(Australia) Mark Webber	Jaguar-Cosworth	1:25.178	1:16.308	+1.289	9
10	20	(France) Olivier Panis	Toyota	1:24.175	1:16.345	+1.326	10
11	15	(Brazil) Antônio Pizzonia	Jaguar-Cosworth	1:24.642	1:16.965	+1.946	11
12	16	(Canada) Jacques Villeneuve	BAR-Honda	1:24.651	1:16.990	+1.971	12
13	21	(Brazil) Cristiano da Matta	Toyota	1:26.975	1:17.068	+2.049	13
14	17	(United Kingdom) Jenson Button	BAR-Honda	1:30.371	1:17.077	+2.058	14
15	9	(Germany) Nick Heidfeld	Sauber-Petronas	1:24.042	1:17.445	+2.426	15
16	10	(Germany) Heinz-Harald Frentzen	Sauber-Petronas	1:26.151	1:17.562	+2.543	16
17	11	(Italy) Giancarlo Fisichella	Jordan-Ford	1:28.502	1:18.431	+3.412	17
18	12	(Republic of Ireland) Ralph Firman	Jordan-Ford	1:23.496	1:18.514	+3.495	18
19	19	(Netherlands) Jos Verstappen	Minardi-Cosworth	1:20.817	1:18.709	+3.690	19
20	18	(United Kingdom) Justin Wilson	Minardi-Cosworth	1:20.968^{1}	1:19.619	+4.600	20

Notes

- ^1 – Justin Wilson drove a time of 1:20.968 but his time was removed because his car was underweight.

== Race ==
The race was held on 6 July 2003 and was run for 70 laps.

=== Race report ===
At the start, the Williamses of Ralf Schumacher and Juan Pablo Montoya kept their places in front, while Kimi Räikkönen managed to get by Michael Schumacher for third position. The German was also challenged by the second McLaren of David Coulthard but stood his ground. His teammate Rubens Barrichello was running eighth at the end of the first lap when he spun his Ferrari coming out of the newly designed final corner.

Ralf Schumacher took full advantage of running in clear air and stretched his lead to four seconds in ten laps. After the first round of pit stops, this was up to seven seconds. Coulthard had stopped earlier than his rivals and managed to jump Michael Schumacher. There were little changes in position up to and including the second round of pit stops. Afterwards, however, both the Renaults suddenly retired. Fernando Alonso's engine expired in a big cloud of smoke on lap 43 and Jarno Trulli pulled off with engine failure three laps later.

During the third round of stops, Ralf Schumacher was held up by backmarkers, but still rejoined ahead of his teammate and then steadily extended his lead to up to ten seconds at the finish. Coulthard left his box when the fuel hose was still attached to his McLaren. He left no one injured but lost a lot of time. This left third place open to Michael Schumacher, who passed Räikkönen when the Finn was suffering from issues with his rear brakes.

=== Post-race ===
Michael Schumacher's lead in the World Drivers' Championship slightly increased to eight points, while his brother Ralf remained third, reducing his deficit to just eleven points. Fourth-placed Montoya was only 17 points behind Schumacher. Following their second consecutive one–two finish, Williams narrowed the gap to Ferrari to three points, while McLaren was another 18 points behind Ferrari in third.

=== Race classification ===
Pos	No	Driver	Constructor	Tyre	Laps	Time/Retired	Grid	Points
1	4	(Germany) Ralf Schumacher	Williams-BMW	M	70	1:30:49.213	1	10
2	3	(Colombia) Juan Pablo Montoya	Williams-BMW	M	70	+13.813	2	8
3	1	(Germany) Michael Schumacher	Ferrari	B	70	+19.568	3	6
4	6	(Finland) Kimi Räikkönen	McLaren-Mercedes	M	70	+38.047	4	5
5	5	(United Kingdom) David Coulthard	McLaren-Mercedes	M	70	+40.289	5	4
6	14	(Australia) Mark Webber	Jaguar-Cosworth	M	70	+1:06.380	9	3
7	2	(Brazil) Rubens Barrichello	Ferrari	B	69	+1 lap	8	2
8	20	(France) Olivier Panis	Toyota	M	69	+1 lap	10	1
9	16	(Canada) Jacques Villeneuve	BAR-Honda	B	69	+1 lap	12	
10	15	(Brazil) Antônio Pizzonia	Jaguar-Cosworth	M	69	+1 lap	11	
11	21	(Brazil) Cristiano da Matta	Toyota	M	69	+1 lap	13	
12	10	(Germany) Heinz-Harald Frentzen	Sauber-Petronas	B	68	+2 laps	16	
13	9	(Germany) Nick Heidfeld	Sauber-Petronas	B	68	+2 laps	15	
14	18	(United Kingdom) Justin Wilson	Minardi-Cosworth	B	67	+3 laps	20	
15	12	(Republic of Ireland) Ralph Firman	Jordan-Ford	B	67	+3 laps	18	
16	19	(Netherlands) Jos Verstappen	Minardi-Cosworth	B	66	+4 laps	19	
Ret	7	(Italy) Jarno Trulli	Renault	M	45	Engine	6	
Ret	8	(Spain) Fernando Alonso	Renault	M	43	Engine	7	
Ret	11	(Italy) Giancarlo Fisichella	Jordan-Ford	B	42	Engine	17	
Ret	17	(United Kingdom) Jenson Button	BAR-Honda	B	21	Out of fuel	14	

== Championship standings after the race ==
Drivers' Championship standings

+/–	Pos	Driver	Points
	1	(Germany) Michael Schumacher	64
	2	(Finland) Kimi Räikkönen	56
	3	(Germany) Ralf Schumacher	53
	4	(Colombia) Juan Pablo Montoya	47
1	5	(Brazil) Rubens Barrichello	39

Constructors' Championship standings

+/–	Pos	Constructor	Points
	1	(Italy) Ferrari	103
	2	(United Kingdom) Williams-BMW	100
	3	(United Kingdom) McLaren-Mercedes	85
	4	(France) Renault	52
	5	(United Kingdom) BAR-Honda	13

- Note: Only the top five positions are included for both sets of standings.

Previous race: 2003 European Grand Prix	FIA Formula One World Championship; 2003 season	Next race: 2003 British Grand Prix
Previous race: 2002 French Grand Prix	French Grand Prix	Next race: 2004 French Grand Prix
