= 2003 Canadian Grand Prix =

Coordinates: 45°30′2.08″N 73°31′20.86″W

Race 8 of 16 in the 2003 Formula One World Championship
← Previous race	Next race →

Race details
- Date: 15 June 2003
- Official name: Grand Prix Air Canada 2003
- Location: Circuit Gilles Villeneuve, Montreal, Quebec, Canada
- Course: Street circuit
- Course length: 4.361 km (2.710 miles)
- Distance: 70 laps, 305.270 km (189.686 miles)
- Weather: Partly cloudy and mild with temperatures reaching a maximum of 19.3 °C (66.7 °F); Wind speeds up to 12.9 km/h (8.0 mph); Track 32 °C (90 °F)
- Attendance: 112,000

Pole position
Driver	(Germany) Ralf Schumacher	Williams-BMW
- Time: 1:15.529

Fastest lap
Driver	(Spain) Fernando Alonso	Renault
- Time: 1:16.040 on lap 53

Podium
First	(Germany) Michael Schumacher	Ferrari
Second	(Germany) Ralf Schumacher	Williams-BMW
Third	(Colombia) Juan Pablo Montoya	Williams-BMW

The 2003 Canadian Grand Prix (officially known as the Grand Prix Air Canada 2003) was a Formula One motor race that took place on 15 June 2003 at the Circuit Gilles Villeneuve in Montreal, Quebec. It was the eighth round of the 2003 Formula One World Championship.

Ralf Schumacher of BMW Williams took pole position for the race. His brother, World Champion Michael Schumacher, won the race, despite nursing an ailing car, ahead of Ralf and Juan Pablo Montoya in the other Williams.

This was the fourth time that the Schumacher brothers finished 1-2, having become the first siblings to do so at the 2001 Canadian Grand Prix.

== Background ==
The Circuit Gilles Villeneuve in Montreal hosted the Canadian Grand Prix for the 25th time in the circuit's history, across the weekend of 13–15 June. The Grand Prix was the eighth round of the 2003 Formula One World Championship and the 35th running of the Canadian Grand Prix as a round of the Formula One World Championship.

=== Championship standings before the race ===
Going into the weekend, McLaren driver Kimi Räikkönen led the Drivers' Championship with 48 points, ahead of Ferrari driver Michael Schumacher on 44 and Renault's Fernando Alonso on 29 points. In the Constructors' Championship, McLaren were leading with 73 points and Ferrari were second on 71 points, with BMW Williams third on 50 points.

== Practice ==
Three free practice sessions were held for the event. Jaguar driver Antônio Pizzonia set the fastest time in the first session, six tenths of a second quicker than Juan Pablo Montoya and Michael Schumacher, in second and third places respectively. The second session was topped by Rubens Barrichello in the Ferrari ahead of Michael Schumacher and Jacques Villeneuve in the BAR. Finally, the Ferraris of Schumacher and Barrichello led the third practice session, ahead of Giancarlo Fisichella in the Jordan.

== Qualifying ==
Qualiyfing consisted of two one-hour sessions, one on Friday and one on Saturday afternoon. The first session's running order was determined by the Drivers' Championship standings, with the leading driver going first. Each driver was allowed to set one lap time. The result determined the running order in the second session: the fastest driver in the first session was allowed to go last in the second session, which usually provided the benefit of a cleaner track. Drivers were again allowed to set one lap time, which determined the order on the grid for the race on Sunday, with the fastest driver scoring pole position.

Ralf Schumacher scored his second consecutive pole position, nearly four tenths ahead of teammate Juan Pablo Montoya and Michael Schumacher.

Pos	No	Driver	Constructor	Q1 Time	Q2 Time	Gap	Grid
1	4	(Germany) Ralf Schumacher	Williams-BMW	1:38.210	1:15.529		1
2	3	(Colombia) Juan Pablo Montoya	Williams-BMW	1:37.479	1:15.923	+0.394	2
3	1	(Germany) Michael Schumacher	Ferrari	1:31.969	1:16.047	+0.518	3
4	8	(Spain) Fernando Alonso	Renault	1:35.173	1:16.048	+0.519	4
5	2	(Brazil) Rubens Barrichello	Ferrari	1:30.925	1:16.143	+0.614	5
6	14	(Australia) Mark Webber	Jaguar-Cosworth	1:36.699	1:16.182	+0.653	6
7	20	(France) Olivier Panis	Toyota	1:37.313	1:16.598	+1.069	7
8	7	(Italy) Jarno Trulli	Renault	1:41.413	1:16.718	+1.189	8
9	21	(Brazil) Cristiano da Matta	Toyota	1:38.244	1:16.826	+1.297	9
10	10	(Germany) Heinz-Harald Frentzen	Sauber-Petronas	1:35.776	1:16.939	+1.410	10
11	5	(United Kingdom) David Coulthard	McLaren-Mercedes	1:36.463	1:17.024	+1.495	11
12	9	(Germany) Nick Heidfeld	Sauber-Petronas	1:32.778	1:17.086	+1.557	12
13	15	(Brazil) Antônio Pizzonia	Jaguar-Cosworth	1:38.255	1:17.337	+1.808	13
14	16	(Canada) Jacques Villeneuve	BAR-Honda	1:44.702	1:17.347	+1.818	14
15	19	(Netherlands) Jos Verstappen	Minardi-Cosworth	1:37.426	1:18.014	+2.485	15
16	11	(Italy) Giancarlo Fisichella	Jordan-Ford	1:38.617	1:18.036	+2.507	16
17	17	(United Kingdom) Jenson Button	BAR-Honda	1:38.109	1:18.205	+2.676	17
18	18	(United Kingdom) Justin Wilson	Minardi-Cosworth	1:38.088	1:18.560	+3.031	18
19	12	(Republic of Ireland) Ralph Firman	Jordan-Ford	1:34.759	1:18.692	+3.163	19
20	6	(Finland) Kimi Räikkönen	McLaren-Mercedes	1:35.373	No time^{1}	+19.844	20

Notes

- ^1 – Kimi Räikkönen spun off at the second corner and did not set a time in Q2.

== Race ==
The race was held on 15 June 2003 and was run for 70 laps.

=== Race report ===
At the start, Ralf Schumacher got away well and kept the lead. Michael Schumacher managed to come alongside of Juan Pablo Montoya, but the Colombian left his braking late and held on along the outside of the corner. Rubens Barrichello in fifth hit the back of Fernando Alonso before Antônio Pizzonia ran into the other Renault of Jarno Trulli. Barrichello and Pizzonia visited the pits for new front wings. At the end of the second lap, Montoya suddenly spun coming out of the final corner. He fell back to fifth position and after the race, admitted it was his own fault.

Montoya recovered quickly by passing Webber and Alonso, before the Williams driver opened the first round of regular pit stops on lap 19. Ralf Schumacher pitted on lap 20, leaving Michael in free air, who immediately set the fastest lap and managed to rejoin the track in what would be the lead after Alonso's stop on lap 26.

After the second round of pit stops, Michael Schumacher slowed down to save his tyres and brakes, which allowed Montoya to close up to him and Ralf, before Alonso joined the leading pack with five laps to go. Barrichello and Räikkönen had come up through the field and were fighting for fifth place. But however close the cars seemed to be, none of them managed to make a move and Michael Schumacher scored his fourth victory of the year, ahead of Ralf Schumacher, scoring just his first podium this season, and Juan Pablo Montoya.

=== Post-race ===
Michael Schumacher's fourth win in the last five races elevated him to the lead of the World Drivers' Championship for the first time this season, distancing Räikkönen by three points who fell to second. While Alonso remained third with 34 points, Ralf Schumacher's podium finish enabled him to improve from seventh to fourth in the championship ahead of teammate Montoya, just one behind Alonso. In the World Constructors' Championship, another change of lead occurred in favour of Ferrari, nine clear of McLaren, while Williams remained in third with a 21-point-deficit towards Ferrari.

=== Race classification ===
Pos	No	Driver	Constructor	Tyre	Laps	Time/Retired	Grid	Points
1	1	(Germany) Michael Schumacher	Ferrari	B	70	1:31:13.591	3	10
2	4	(Germany) Ralf Schumacher	Williams-BMW	M	70	+0.784	1	8
3	3	(Colombia) Juan Pablo Montoya	Williams-BMW	M	70	+1.355	2	6
4	8	(Spain) Fernando Alonso	Renault	M	70	+4.481	4	5
5	2	(Brazil) Rubens Barrichello	Ferrari	B	70	+1:04.261	5	4
6	6	(Finland) Kimi Räikkönen	McLaren-Mercedes	M	70	+1:10.502	PL^{2}	3
7	14	(Australia) Mark Webber	Jaguar-Cosworth	M	69	+1 Lap	6	2
8	20	(France) Olivier Panis	Toyota	M	69	+1 Lap	7	1
9	19	(Netherlands) Jos Verstappen	Minardi-Cosworth	B	68	+2 Laps	15	
10	15	(Brazil) Antônio Pizzonia	Jaguar-Cosworth	M	66	Brakes	13	
11	21	(Brazil) Cristiano da Matta	Toyota	M	64	Suspension	9	
Ret	18	(United Kingdom) Justin Wilson	Minardi-Cosworth	B	60	Gearbox	18	
Ret	17	(United Kingdom) Jenson Button	BAR-Honda	B	51	Gearbox	17	
Ret	5	(United Kingdom) David Coulthard	McLaren-Mercedes	M	47	Gearbox	11	
Ret	9	(Germany) Nick Heidfeld	Sauber-Petronas	B	47	Engine	12	
Ret	7	(Italy) Jarno Trulli	Renault	M	22	Collision damage	8	
Ret	11	(Italy) Giancarlo Fisichella	Jordan-Ford	B	20	Gearbox	16	
Ret	12	(Republic of Ireland) Ralph Firman	Jordan-Ford	B	20	Engine	PL^{2}	
Ret	16	(Canada) Jacques Villeneuve	BAR-Honda	B	14	Brakes	14	
Ret	10	(Germany) Heinz-Harald Frentzen	Sauber-Petronas	B	6	Electronics	10	

Notes

- ^2 – Kimi Räikkönen and Ralph Firman started from the pit lane.

== Championship standings after the race ==
Drivers' Championship standings

+/–	Pos	Driver	Points
1	1	(Germany) Michael Schumacher	54
1	2	(Finland) Kimi Räikkönen	51
	3	(Spain) Fernando Alonso	34
3	4	(Germany) Ralf Schumacher	33
	5	(Colombia) Juan Pablo Montoya	31

Constructors' Championship standings

+/–	Pos	Constructor	Points
1	1	(Italy) Ferrari	85
1	2	(United Kingdom) McLaren-Mercedes	76
	3	(United Kingdom) Williams-BMW	64
	4	(France) Renault	47
	5	(Republic of Ireland) Jordan-Ford	11

- Note: Only the top five positions are included for both sets of standings.

Previous race: 2003 Monaco Grand Prix	FIA Formula One World Championship; 2003 season	Next race: 2003 European Grand Prix
Previous race: 2002 Canadian Grand Prix	Canadian Grand Prix	Next race: 2004 Canadian Grand Prix
