= 2003 Monaco Grand Prix =

Formula One motor race held in 2003

Coordinates: 43°44′4.74″N 7°25′16.8″E

Race 7 of 16 in the 2003 Formula One World Championship
← Previous race	Next race →

Race details
- Date: 1 June 2003
- Official name: Grand Prix de Monaco 2003
- Location: Circuit de Monaco, Monaco
- Course: Street circuit
- Course length: 3.34 km (2.075 miles)
- Distance: 78 laps, 260.52 km (161.85 miles)
- Weather: Sunny at start, cloudy later

Pole position
Driver	(Germany) Ralf Schumacher	Williams-BMW
- Time: 1:15.259

Fastest lap
Driver	(Finland) Kimi Räikkönen	McLaren-Mercedes
- Time: 1:14.545 on lap 49

Podium
First	(Colombia) Juan Pablo Montoya	Williams-BMW
Second	(Finland) Kimi Räikkönen	McLaren-Mercedes
Third	(Germany) Michael Schumacher	Ferrari

The 2003 Monaco Grand Prix (officially known as the Grand Prix de Monaco 2003) was a Formula One motor race that took place on 1 June 2003 at the Circuit de Monaco in Monte Carlo, Monaco. It was the seventh round of the 2003 Formula One World Championship.

Ralf Schumacher of BMW Williams took pole position for the race, but his teammate Juan Pablo Montoya won the race ahead of championship leader Kimi Räikkönen of McLaren and current World Champion Michael Schumacher of Ferrari. It was Williams's first victory in Monaco since Keke Rosberg in 1983.

There were no recorded on-track overtakes during this race, one of the very few occasions in Formula One history where this has occurred. The other three races since 1981 not to feature any on-track overtakes were the controversial 2005 United States and 2021 Belgian Grands Prix, as well as the 2009 European Grand Prix.

== Background ==
Across the weekend of 29 May - 1 June, the Circuit de Monaco in Monte Carlo hosted a Formula One Grand Prix for the 50th time in the circuit's history, with it being the 50th Monaco Grand Prix as a round of the Formula One World Championship as well. The Grand Prix was the seventh round of the 2003 Formula One World Championship.

=== Championship standings before the race ===
Going into the weekend, McLaren driver Kimi Räikkönen led the Drivers' Championship with 40 points, ahead of Ferrari drivers Michael Schumacher and Rubens Barrichello on 38 and 26 points, respectively. In the Constructors' Championship, Ferrari were leading with 64 points and McLaren were second on 63 points, with Renault third on 35 points.

=== Entrants ===
The Grand Prix was contested by 20 drivers, in ten teams of two. The teams, also known as constructors, were Ferrari, Williams, McLaren, Renault, Sauber, Jordan, Jaguar, BAR, Minardi and Toyota.

== Practice ==
Three free practice sessions were held for the event. Jaguar driver Mark Webber set the fastest time in the first session, a tenth of a second quicker than Jenson Button and David Coulthard, in second and third places respectively. Webber was third in the second session, which was topped by Kimi Räikkönen in the McLaren ahead of Juan Pablo Montoya in the BMW Williams. Finally, Coulthard led the third practice session, ahead of Montoya and World Champion Michael Schumacher in the Ferrari.

Jenson Button suffered a heavy crash during Saturday morning practice and his resulting injuries meant that he took no further part in the weekend.

== Qualifying ==
Qualiyfing consisted of two one-hour sessions, one on Friday and one on Saturday afternoon. The first session's running order was determined by the Drivers' Championship standings, with the leading driver going first. Each driver was allowed to set one lap time. The result determined the running order in the second session: the fastest driver in the first session was allowed to go last in the second session, which usually provided the benefit of a cleaner track. Drivers were again allowed to set one lap time, which determined the order on the grid for the race on Sunday, with the fastest driver scoring pole position.

Ralf Schumacher scored his first pole position in nearly two years. In contrast, his brother Michael's fifth starting place was his worst qualifying performance at this circuit since he first competed there in 1992.

Pos	No	Driver	Constructor	Q1 Time	Q2 Time	Gap	Grid
1	4	(Germany) Ralf Schumacher	Williams-BMW	1:17.063	1:15.259		1
2	6	(Finland) Kimi Räikkönen	McLaren-Mercedes	1:17.926	1:15.295	+0.036	2
3	3	(Colombia) Juan Pablo Montoya	Williams-BMW	1:17.108	1:15.415	+0.156	3
4	7	(Italy) Jarno Trulli	Renault	1:16.905	1:15.500	+0.241	4
5	1	(Germany) Michael Schumacher	Ferrari	1:16.305	1:15.644	+0.385	5
6	5	(United Kingdom) David Coulthard	McLaren-Mercedes	1:17.059	1:15.700	+0.441	6
7	2	(Brazil) Rubens Barrichello	Ferrari	1:16.636	1:15.820	+0.561	7
8	8	(Spain) Fernando Alonso	Renault	1:18.370	1:15.884	+0.625	8
9	14	(Australia) Mark Webber	Jaguar-Cosworth	1:17.637	1:16.237	+0.978	9
10	21	(Brazil) Cristiano da Matta	Toyota	1:20.374	1:16.744	+1.485	10
11	16	(Canada) Jacques Villeneuve	BAR-Honda	1:18.109	1:16.755	+1.496	11
12	11	(Italy) Giancarlo Fisichella	Jordan-Ford	1:17.080	1:16.967	+1.708	12
13	15	(Brazil) Antônio Pizzonia	Jaguar-Cosworth	1:18.967	1:17.103	+1.844	13
14	9	(Germany) Nick Heidfeld	Sauber-Petronas	1:17.912	1:17.176	+1.917	14
15	10	(Germany) Heinz-Harald Frentzen	Sauber-Petronas	No time	1:17.402	+2.143	15
16	12	(Republic of Ireland) Ralph Firman	Jordan-Ford	1:18.286	1:17.452	+2.193	16
17	20	(France) Olivier Panis	Toyota	1:19.903	1:17.464	+2.205	17
18	19	(Netherlands) Jos Verstappen	Minardi-Cosworth	1:19.421	1:18.706	+3.447	18
19	18	(United Kingdom) Justin Wilson	Minardi-Cosworth	1:19.680	1:20.063	+4.804	19
20	17	(United Kingdom) Jenson Button	BAR-Honda	1:16.685	No time^{1}	—	20

Notes

- ^1 – Jenson Button was left without a time in Q2 after a spin in Saturday's practice.

== Race ==
The race was held on 1 June 2003 and was run for 78 laps.

=== Race report ===
Ralf Schumacher led the pack through the first corner without incidents. His teammate Juan Pablo Montoya was the first to follow, having overtaken Kimi Räikkönen in the McLaren. Behind them came Jarno Trulli, Michael Schumacher and Fernando Alonso, the Spaniard overtaking two drivers on the getaway. Heinz-Harald Frentzen did not finish the first lap, after going wide over the kerbs at the swimming pool chicane, losing control of his Sauber and crashing it hard into the armco barrier.

After four laps behind the safety car to let the marshals clear the track, the race continued and the top three escaped from the rest of the pack, mainly due to Trulli's cautious pace. Montoya put heavy pressure on his leading teammate, running less than half a second behind when Schumacher made his pit stop. The Colombian made use of the clean air on just one lap. He immediately set the fastest lap time of the race and after his stop, rejoined just in front of his teammate. To make matters worse for the German, Räikkönen also appeared ahead him after the Finn had pitted. Michael Schumacher overtook Trulli through the pit stop phase and David Coulthard got ahead of Alonso.

When Montoya made his second stop, Räikkönen set the fastest lap in an effort to jump his rival, but he rejoined just behind the Williams. Meanwhile, Ralf Schumacher had fallen back to fourth position, behind his brother, and almost crashed at Rascasse corner. Alonso on the other hand, took advantage of an alternative strategy to jump both Coulthard and teammate Trulli in the pit stops.

With fifteen laps to go, Montoya had Räikkönen continuously right behind him and Michael Schumacher closing in by seven tenths per lap, but he held on to take his first victory in nearly two years.

=== Post-race ===
Räikkönen outscored Michael Schumacher by two points, thus extending his points advantage to four points, while Alonso reclaimed third spot in the standings with 29 points, two ahead of Barrichello and four behind Montoya, who advanced to fifth following his first win of the season. Meanwhile, McLaren reclaimed their lead in the Constructors' Championship, leading Ferrari by two points, whilst Williams overtook Renault to enter the next round in third place with 50 points, 23 behind McLaren.

=== Race classification ===
Pos	No	Driver	Constructor	Tyre	Laps	Time/Retired	Grid	Points
1	3	(Colombia) Juan Pablo Montoya	Williams-BMW	M	78	1:42:19.010	3	10
2	6	(Finland) Kimi Räikkönen	McLaren-Mercedes	M	78	+ 0.602	2	8
3	1	(Germany) Michael Schumacher	Ferrari	B	78	+ 1.720	5	6
4	4	(Germany) Ralf Schumacher	Williams-BMW	M	78	+ 28.518	1	5
5	8	(Spain) Fernando Alonso	Renault	M	78	+ 36.251	8	4
6	7	(Italy) Jarno Trulli	Renault	M	78	+ 40.972	4	3
7	5	(United Kingdom) David Coulthard	McLaren-Mercedes	M	78	+ 41.227	6	2
8	2	(Brazil) Rubens Barrichello	Ferrari	B	78	+ 53.266	7	1
9	21	(Brazil) Cristiano da Matta	Toyota	M	77	+ 1 Lap	10	
10	11	(Italy) Giancarlo Fisichella	Jordan-Ford	B	77	+ 1 Lap	12	
11	9	(Germany) Nick Heidfeld	Sauber-Petronas	B	76	+ 2 Laps	14	
12	12	(Republic of Ireland) Ralph Firman	Jordan-Ford	B	76	+ 2 Laps	16	
13	20	(France) Olivier Panis	Toyota	M	74	+ 4 Laps	17	
Ret	16	(Canada) Jacques Villeneuve	BAR-Honda	B	63	Engine	11	
Ret	18	(United Kingdom) Justin Wilson	Minardi-Cosworth	B	29	Fuel system	19	
Ret	19	(Netherlands) Jos Verstappen	Minardi-Cosworth	B	28	Fuel system	18	
Ret	14	(Australia) Mark Webber	Jaguar-Cosworth	M	16	Hydraulics	9	
Ret	15	(Brazil) Antônio Pizzonia	Jaguar-Cosworth	M	10	Electrical	13	
Ret	10	(Germany) Heinz-Harald Frentzen	Sauber-Petronas	B	0	Accident	15	
DNS	17	(United Kingdom) Jenson Button	BAR-Honda	B	—	Driver injured	—	

== Championship standings after the race ==
Drivers' Championship standings

+/–	Pos	Driver	Points
	1	(Finland) Kimi Räikkönen	48
	2	(Germany) Michael Schumacher	44
1	3	(Spain) Fernando Alonso	29
1	4	(Brazil) Rubens Barrichello	27
2	5	(Colombia) Juan Pablo Montoya	25

Constructors' Championship standings

+/–	Pos	Constructor	Points
1	1	(United Kingdom) McLaren-Mercedes	73
1	2	(Italy) Ferrari	71
1	3	(United Kingdom) Williams-BMW	50
1	4	(France) Renault	42
	5	(Republic of Ireland) Jordan-Ford	11

- Note: Only the top five positions are included for both sets of standings.

== See also ==
- 2003 Monaco F3000 round

Previous race: 2003 Austrian Grand Prix	FIA Formula One World Championship; 2003 season	Next race: 2003 Canadian Grand Prix
Previous race: 2002 Monaco Grand Prix	Monaco Grand Prix	Next race: 2004 Monaco Grand Prix
