= 2003 Austrian Grand Prix =

Coordinates: 47°13′11″N 14°45′53″E

Race 6 of 16 in the 2003 Formula One World Championship
| ← Previous race | Next race → |

Race details
- Date: 18 May 2003
- Official name: A1 Grand Prix von Österreich 2003
- Location: A1-Ring, Spielberg, Austria
- Course: Permanent racing facility
- Course length: 4.326 km (2.684 miles)
- Distance: 69 laps, 298.494 km (185.196 miles)
- Scheduled distance: 71 laps, 307.146 km (190.564 miles)
- Weather: Mostly cloudy with isolated showers in the area

Pole position
| Driver | (Germany) Michael Schumacher | Ferrari |
- Time: 1:09.150

Fastest lap
| Driver | (Germany) Michael Schumacher | Ferrari |
- Time: 1:08.337 on lap 41 (lap record)

Podium
| First | (Germany) Michael Schumacher | Ferrari |
| Second | (Finland) Kimi Räikkönen | McLaren-Mercedes |
| Third | (Brazil) Rubens Barrichello | Ferrari |

The 2003 Austrian Grand Prix (formally known as A1 Grand Prix von Österreich 2003) was a Formula One motor race held on 18 May 2003 at the A1-Ring. It was the sixth round of the 2003 Formula One season and the 27th Austrian Grand Prix. The 69-lap race was won by Michael Schumacher driving a Ferrari car after starting from pole position. Kimi Räikkönen finished second driving for McLaren with Rubens Barrichello third in the other Ferrari. It was the last Austrian Grand Prix to be held until it returned to the renamed Red Bull Ring in 2014.

It was Ferrari's last win in Austria until 2022.

== Background ==
The Grand Prix was contested by ten teams with two drivers each. The teams (also known as constructors) were Ferrari, Williams, McLaren, Renault, Sauber, Jordan, Jaguar, BAR, Minardi and Toyota. It was announced in January 2003 that the Austrian Grand Prix would be dropped from the Formula One calendar in 2004, three years before the contract for the race was due to expire. This was because an exit clause was enabled in response to the European Union pushing forward a ban on tobacco advertising to 1 October 2005.

Before the race, McLaren driver Kimi Räikkönen led the Drivers' Championship with 32 points, ahead of Michael Schumacher (28) and Fernando Alonso (25). Rubens Barrichello was fourth with 20 points, while David Coulthard was a close fifth with 19 points. In the Constructors' Championship, McLaren was leading with 51 points, three points ahead of their rival Ferrari. Renault (34 points) and Williams (32 points) contended for fourth place and Jordan was fifth with 11 points.

== Qualifying ==
Qualifying was interesting, as there was no knowledge of what the weather would be for the race, making tyre and fuel strategy critical. Michael Schumacher qualified on pole despite a huge slide on his best qualifying lap. Championship leader Kimi Räikkönen qualified second, and was given special dispensation from the FIA to change his cracked valve, without incurring the usual penalty for changing an engine.

=== Qualifying classification ===
| Pos | No | Driver | Constructor | Q1 Time | Q2 Time | Gap | Grid |
|---|---|---|---|---|---|---|---|
| 1 | 1 | (Germany) Michael Schumacher | Ferrari | 1:07.908 | 1:09.150 | | 1 |
| 2 | 6 | (Finland) Kimi Räikkönen | McLaren-Mercedes | 1:08.978 | 1:09.189 | +0.039 | 2 |
| 3 | 3 | (Colombia) Juan Pablo Montoya | Williams-BMW | 1:08.839 | 1:09.391 | +0.241 | 3 |
| 4 | 9 | (Germany) Nick Heidfeld | Sauber-Petronas | 1:09.479 | 1:09.725 | +0.575 | 4 |
| 5 | 2 | (Brazil) Rubens Barrichello | Ferrari | 1:08.187 | 1:09.784 | +0.634 | 5 |
| 6 | 7 | (Italy) Jarno Trulli | Renault | 1:09.450 | 1:09.890 | +0.740 | 6 |
| 7 | 17 | (United Kingdom) Jenson Button | BAR-Honda | 1:08.831 | 1:09.935 | +0.785 | 7 |
| 8 | 15 | (Brazil) Antônio Pizzonia | Jaguar-Cosworth | 1:09.024 | 1:10.045 | +0.895 | 8 |
| 9 | 11 | (Italy) Giancarlo Fisichella | Jordan-Ford | 1:09.281 | 1:10.105 | +0.955 | 9 |
| 10 | 4 | (Germany) Ralf Schumacher | Williams-BMW | No time^{1} | 1:10.279 | +1.129 | 10 |
| 11 | 20 | (France) Olivier Panis | Toyota | 1:09.764 | 1:10.402 | +1.252 | 11 |
| 12 | 16 | (Canada) Jacques Villeneuve | BAR-Honda | 1:08.680 | 1:10.618 | +1.468 | 12 |
| 13 | 21 | (Brazil) Cristiano da Matta | Toyota | 1:10.370 | 1:10.834 | +1.684 | 13 |
| 14 | 5 | (United Kingdom) David Coulthard | McLaren-Mercedes | 1:08.947 | 1:10.893 | +1.743 | 14 |
| 15 | 10 | (Germany) Heinz-Harald Frentzen | Sauber-Petronas | 1:10.055 | 1:11.307 | +2.157 | 15 |
| 16 | 12 | (Republic of Ireland) Ralph Firman | Jordan-Ford | 1:11.171 | 1:11.505 | +2.355 | 16 |
| 17 | 14 | (Australia) Mark Webber | Jaguar-Cosworth | 1:08.512 | 1:11.662 | +2.512 | 17 |
| 18 | 18 | (United Kingdom) Justin Wilson | Minardi-Cosworth | 1:11.056 | 1:14.508 | +5.358 | 18 |
| 19 | 8 | (Spain) Fernando Alonso | Renault | 1:09.680 | 1:20.113 | +10.963 | 19 |
| 20 | 19 | (Netherlands) Jos Verstappen | Minardi-Cosworth | 1:10.894 | No time^{2} | | 20 |

Notes

- ^1 – Ralf Schumacher did not get any time in Q1 after going off the track at the fourth corner.
- ^2 – Jos Verstappen did not get time in Q2 due to gearbox problems.

== Race ==
Fernando Alonso chose to start from the pitlane in the spare car, and Mark Webber chose to start from the pitlane in his regular car. This meant Webber could not change tyres or add fuel until the race started, whereas Alonso could. His Jaguar broke this rule, and so Webber received a 10-second stop/go penalty.

Cristiano da Matta had a faulty launch control, which caused 2 aborted starts, reducing the race to 69 laps. On the third (and final) formation lap, Heinz-Harald Frentzen's Sauber did not start, and he did not have time to set up the team car.

At the start, Jos Verstappen's launch control broke, and he retired. This caused the safety car to be deployed. Michael eventually led Montoya and Räikkönen when the green flag came out at the end of lap 4. The field remained relatively stable for the next several laps.

After 11 laps, it started to rain lightly, although it was not enough to force cars into the pits. Moments later, Jarno Trulli's Renault spun at turn one and he rejoined without problems. On lap 23, Michael pitted and there was a problem with his fuel filler, possibly caused by the fact that the team had used it to fill up Rubens Barrichello's car, which had a very slow first stop. Some of the fuel that actually did come out of the nozzle hit the bodywork on the sidepods, causing a small fire. The fire was extinguished quickly, and Michael continued in the race, losing about 12 seconds and was now running in third position.

On lap 32, everything turned into Michael's favour. Räikkönen was having engine-related performance problems, and this allowed Schumacher to catch and eventually pass him. On the straight between turns two and three, leader Juan Pablo Montoya's engine blew up. He made it back to the garage, and Michael was back in the lead. Alonso was on a good run despite starting from the pit lane, and was running in the top five when he spun off course at turn one, on what turned out to be his own oil caused by a blown engine in his Renault. Michael eventually set the fastest lap of the day, at an average speed of 227.894 km/h.

After the second round of stops, Barrichello closed up on second-place Räikkönen, but was unable to pass him due to some good defensive moves by Kimi, despite his car being clearly faster. Michael eventually went on to win the race, his third successive of the season. Jenson Button finished fourth for BAR despite being disappointed in qualifying, and David Coulthard's race was uneventful in fifth place. Ralf Schumacher was sixth, Webber finished a brilliant seventh despite his penalties, and Trulli was eighth for the final point. Despite causing the aborted starts earlier in the day, da Matta finished the race, a lap down in tenth position.

=== Race classification ===
| Pos | No | Driver | Constructor | Tyre | Laps | Time/Retired | Grid | Points |
|---|---|---|---|---|---|---|---|---|
| 1 | 1 | (Germany) Michael Schumacher | Ferrari | B | 69 | 1:24:04.888 | 1 | 10 |
| 2 | 6 | (Finland) Kimi Räikkönen | McLaren-Mercedes | M | 69 | +3.362 | 2 | 8 |
| 3 | 2 | (Brazil) Rubens Barrichello | Ferrari | B | 69 | +3.951 | 5 | 6 |
| 4 | 17 | (United Kingdom) Jenson Button | BAR-Honda | B | 69 | +42.243 | 7 | 5 |
| 5 | 5 | (United Kingdom) David Coulthard | McLaren-Mercedes | M | 69 | +59.740 | 14 | 4 |
| 6 | 4 | (Germany) Ralf Schumacher | Williams-BMW | M | 68 | +1 Lap | 10 | 3 |
| 7 | 14 | (Australia) Mark Webber | Jaguar-Cosworth | M | 68 | +1 Lap | PL^{3} | 2 |
| 8 | 7 | (Italy) Jarno Trulli | Renault | M | 68 | +1 Lap | 6 | 1 |
| 9 | 15 | (Brazil) Antônio Pizzonia | Jaguar-Cosworth | M | 68 | +1 Lap | 8 | |
| 10 | 21 | (Brazil) Cristiano da Matta | Toyota | M | 68 | +1 Lap | 13 | |
| 11 | 12 | (Republic of Ireland) Ralph Firman | Jordan-Ford | B | 68 | +1 Lap | 16 | |
| 12 | 16 | (Canada) Jacques Villeneuve | BAR-Honda | B | 68 | +1 Lap | 12 | |
| 13 | 18 | (United Kingdom) Justin Wilson | Minardi-Cosworth | B | 67 | +2 Laps | 18 | |
| Ret | 11 | (Italy) Giancarlo Fisichella | Jordan-Ford | B | 60 | Fuel system | 9 | |
| Ret | 9 | (Germany) Nick Heidfeld | Sauber-Petronas | B | 46 | Engine | 4 | |
| Ret | 8 | (Spain) Fernando Alonso | Renault | M | 44 | Engine/Spin | PL^{3} | |
| Ret | 3 | (Colombia) Juan Pablo Montoya | Williams-BMW | M | 32 | Engine | 3 | |
| Ret | 20 | (France) Olivier Panis | Toyota | M | 6 | Suspension | 11 | |
| Ret | 19 | (Netherlands) Jos Verstappen | Minardi-Cosworth | B | 0 | Launch control | 20 | |
| DNS | 10 | (Germany) Heinz-Harald Frentzen | Sauber-Petronas | B | 0 | Clutch | 15 | |

Notes

- ^3 – Mark Webber and Fernando Alonso started from the pit lane.

== Championship standings after the race ==
While Schumacher reduced the gap to Räikkönen to just two points in the Drivers' Championship, Schumacher's teammate Barrichello overtook Alonso for third in the standings following the Spaniard's retirement. Barrichello moved to 26 points, twelve shy of Schumacher and a further two behind Räikkönen, respectively. As far as the Constructors' Championship was concerned, reigning quadruple champion Ferrari emerged as the new leaders by just a single point over McLaren following their third consecutive double podium.

Drivers' Championship standings

| +/– | Pos | Driver | Points |
|---|---|---|---|
| | 1 | (Finland) Kimi Räikkönen | 40 |
| | 2 | (Germany) Michael Schumacher | 38 |
| 1 | 3 | (Brazil) Rubens Barrichello | 26 |
| 1 | 4 | (Spain) Fernando Alonso | 25 |
| | 5 | (United Kingdom) David Coulthard | 23 |

Constructors' Championship standings

| +/– | Pos | Constructor | Points |
|---|---|---|---|
| 1 | 1 | (Italy) Ferrari | 64 |
| 1 | 2 | (United Kingdom) McLaren-Mercedes | 63 |
| | 3 | (France) Renault | 35 |
| | 4 | (United Kingdom) Williams-BMW | 35 |
| | 5 | (Republic of Ireland) Jordan-Ford | 11 |

- Note: Only the top five positions are included for both sets of standings.

| Previous race: 2003 Spanish Grand Prix | FIA Formula One World Championship; 2003 season | Next race: 2003 Monaco Grand Prix |
| Previous race: 2002 Austrian Grand Prix | Austrian Grand Prix | Next race: 2014 Austrian Grand Prix |
