= Jaguar R5 =

Formula One racing car

Jaguar R5 Jaguar R5B
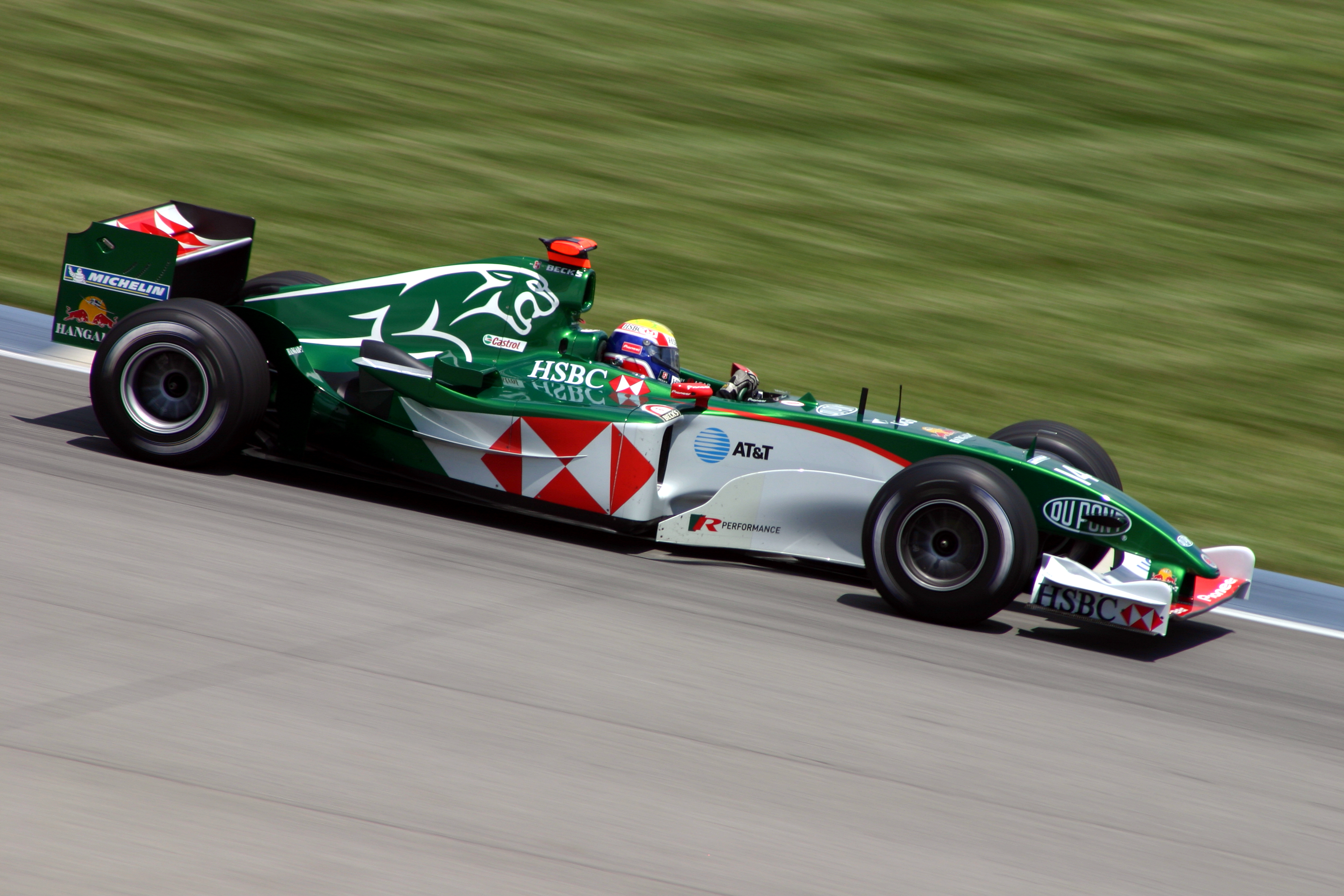
- Mark Webber driving the R5 at the 2004 United States Grand Prix
- Category: Formula One
- Constructor: Jaguar
- Designers: David Pitchforth (Managing Director - Technical); Ian Pocock (Engineering Director); Malcolm Oastler (Chief Engineer); Rob Taylor (Chief Designer); Chris Hammond (Head of Vehicle Science); Ben Agathangelou (Head of Aerodynamics); Nick Hayes (Engine Chief Designer - Cosworth)
- Predecessor: R4
- Successor: Red Bull RB1

Technical specifications
- Chassis: Carbon-fibre monocoque
- Engine: Cosworth CR-6 V10 (72°) naturally-aspirated mid-engine
- Transmission: Jaguar 7-speed longitudinal semi-automatic sequential
- Power: 900 hp @ 19,000 rpm
- Fuel: BP
- Lubricants: Castrol
- Tyres: Michelin

Competition history
- Notable entrants: Jaguar Racing
- Notable drivers: 14. (Australia) Mark Webber; 15. (Austria) Christian Klien
- Debut: 2004 Australian Grand Prix
- Last event: 2004 Brazilian Grand Prix
Races	Wins	Poles	F/Laps
18	0	0	0
- Constructors' Championships: 0
- Drivers' Championships: 0

The Jaguar R5 was a Formula One racing car used by Jaguar Racing to contest the 2004 Formula One season. The R5 was the last chassis made by Jaguar Racing, before they became Red Bull Racing in 2005. The car was driven by Mark Webber and rookie Christian Klien and its first 2004 Formula One outing was at the Circuit de Catalunya, Barcelona in pre-season testing.

Jaguar used an updated R5B chassis for two races. Klien gave the B spec chassis its debut in China and Webber used it in Brazil. The R5B had originally been taken to the Italian Grand Prix but was not used. Webber drove the R5B in Japan during Friday practice, but due to the lack of running have to revert to the old car for the race.

== History ==
The car was relatively successful, with Webber scoring four points finishes including a sixth place at Hockenheim. Klien also proved reliable, retiring on only four occasions and managing sixth place at Spa-Francorchamps.

Jaguar finished seventh in their final Constructors' Championship, with 10 points. Jaguar's successor, Red Bull Racing, retained Klien for 2005, while Webber moved to Williams (only to later return to Red Bull).

== Sponsorship and livery ==
As with the previous seasons, the car was painted in dark green with white accents. The team retained their long-tem sponsorship with HSBC during the Stewart Grand Prix period along with support from Hangar-7.

At the Monaco Grand Prix, Jaguar unveiled a special livery to promote the new film, Ocean's Twelve. The car's airbox and red-painted nose feature the movie's logo, and the car's nose features a diamond worth $300.000 owned by jewelry brand Steinmetz. Klien crashed into the guardrails at the Loews hairpin on the first lap. When Jaguar personnel arrived at the crash site, the diamond was gone. During the Chinese Grand Prix, the HSBC lettering was change to its Chinese acronym, 汇丰 (huìfēng).

At the Brazilian Grand Prix the team earned an odd form of publicity when two of its engineers adopted an inflatable donkey (acquired following a give-away on a soda can) from the movie Shrek as an impromptu team mascot. Bernie Ecclestone, Max Mosley, much of the sport's management, and every driver except Michael Schumacher signed the donkey, which the engineers promised to auction off for charity.

== Red Bull R5 ==
When Red Bull bought the Jaguar team in November 2004, they had just a few days to come up with an all new livery in time for their first pre season tests. The livery was light blue and grey and resembled an energy drink can in colour.

== BOSS GP ==
The R5 made a second racing debut in BOSS GP at the 2011 Hockenheim Historic driven by Klaas Zwart coming second in the first race and retiring in the second. Zwart would then go on to win the Open class title in 2011, 2012, and 2015. The car was later badly damaged in 2017 in a BOSS GP race at Assen TT circuit. This car was repaired and returned to racing in 2019.

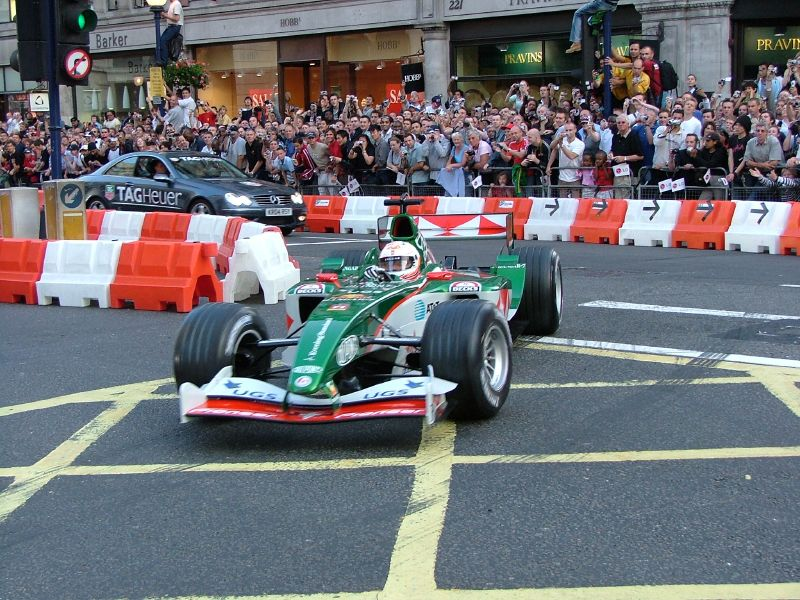
R5 presented in London on 6 July 2004

== Complete Formula One results ==
(key)

Year	Team	Engine	Tyres	Drivers	1	2	3	4	5	6	7	8	9	10	11	12	13	14	15	16	17	18	Points	WCC
2004	Jaguar	Cosworth V10	M		AUS	MAL	BHR	SMR	ESP	MON	EUR	CAN	USA	FRA	GBR	GER	HUN	BEL	ITA	CHN	JPN	BRA	10	7th
2004	Jaguar	Cosworth V10	M	(Australia) Mark Webber	Ret	Ret	8	13	12	Ret	7	Ret	Ret	9	8	6	10	Ret	9	10	Ret	Ret	10	7th
2004	Jaguar	Cosworth V10	M	(Austria) Christian Klien	11	10	14	14	Ret	Ret	12	9	Ret	11	14	10	13	6	13	Ret	12	14	10	7th
