= Jaguar R4 =

Formula One racing car

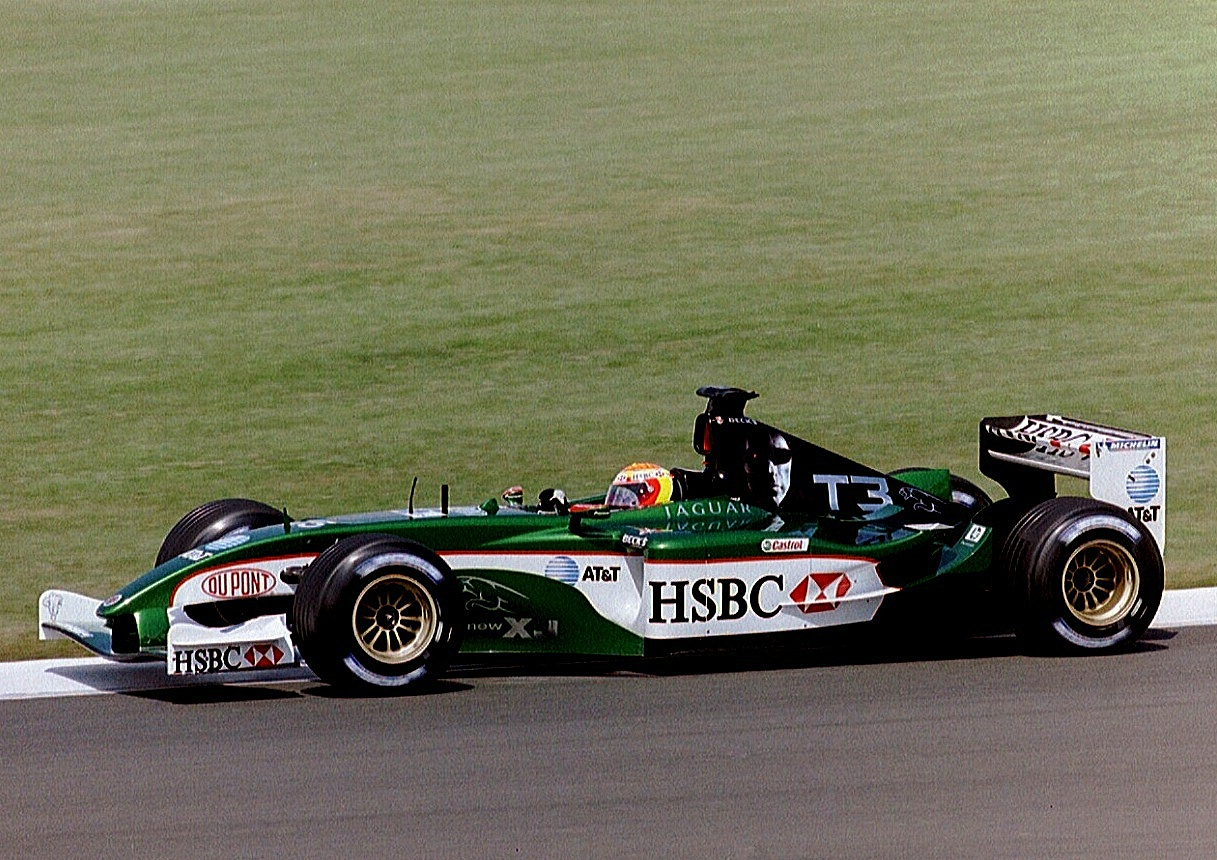
- Antônio Pizzonia driving the R4 at the 2003 British Grand Prix; his last race for Jaguar. Note the Terminator 3: Rise of the Machines promotion on the engine cover.
- Category: Formula One
- Constructor: Jaguar
- Designers: David Pitchforth (Managing Director - Technical); Malcolm Oastler (Chief Engineer); Rob Taylor (Chief Designer); Chris Hammond (Head of Vehicle Science); Ben Agathangelou (Head of Aerodynamics); Nick Hayes (Engine Chief Designer - Cosworth)
- Predecessor: Jaguar R3
- Successor: Jaguar R5

Technical specifications
- Chassis: Carbon-fibre monocoque
- Suspension (front): double wishbones, pushrods, torsion bars
- Suspension (rear): double wishbones, pushrods, torsion bars
- Engine: Cosworth CR-5 3.0-litre V10 naturally aspirated 90-degree
- Transmission: Jaguar 7-speed magnesium-cased longitudinal semi-automatic
- Power: 900 hp @ 19,000 rpm
- Fuel: BP
- Lubricants: Castrol
- Tyres: Michelin

Competition history
- Notable entrants: Jaguar Racing
- Notable drivers: 14. (Australia) Mark Webber; 15. (Brazil) Antônio Pizzonia; 15. (United Kingdom) Justin Wilson
- Debut: 2003 Australian Grand Prix
- Last event: 2003 Japanese Grand Prix
Races	Wins	Poles	F/Laps
16	0	0	0
- Constructors' Championships: 0
- Drivers' Championships: 0

The Jaguar R4 is a Formula One car with which Jaguar Racing competed in the 2003 Formula One season. It was driven by Mark Webber, Antônio Pizzonia and Justin Wilson.

After three years in Formula One, and amid a turbulent atmosphere that had claimed the leaderships of Niki Lauda and Bobby Rahal, Jaguar Racing became much more stable in 2003. Now led by Tony Purnell and David Pitchforth, results – previously elusive – were a priority. At the end of 2002 Eddie Irvine was out of contract and retired from Formula One, and Pedro de la Rosa was negotiated out of his standing contract. New drivers Mark Webber and Antônio Pizzonia were drafted into the team and the entirety of the management team was re-structured.

The car was also revamped, with the R4 representing a fresh approach compared to the previous season's R3. Its designers focused on producing a much stiffer chassis, and aimed to root out problems during the pre-season with a concerted programme of on-track testing and factory work.

== 2003 season ==
Despite the priority on testing, the new R4 was barely ready for the 2003 season, having covered comparatively few miles as a finished package. Reliability problems had caused delays, although engine suppliers Cosworth performed well by supplying the team with engines for the hybrid chassis and testing.

At the Brazilian Grand Prix Webber crashed heavily, triggering an incident that led to the race being red flagged. Webber's commitment and determination was a boost to the team, recording several sixth- and seventh-place finishes en-route to a Constructors' Championship finish of sixth. Pizzonia lagged far behind, despite his experience and the car's performance as demonstrated by Webber's results.

== Pizzonia issues ==
After the Spanish Grand Prix Antônio Pizzonia's seat was under threat and it was reported widely that Jaguar wanted to snap up experienced McLaren test driver Alexander Wurz. However this came to nothing, as McLaren wanted Wurz's experience in developing its new car and retained the Austrian as test driver. This left Jaguar in a tricky position, backtracking and apologising with Pizzônia remaining in the car until the British Grand Prix. Despite a lap 44 retirement due to gearbox issues, this was his most convincing drive of the season; however Jaguar replaced him with Justin Wilson from the Minardi team and thus for the first time in history Jaguar Racing fielded all-Minardi-alumni drivers.

== Livery ==
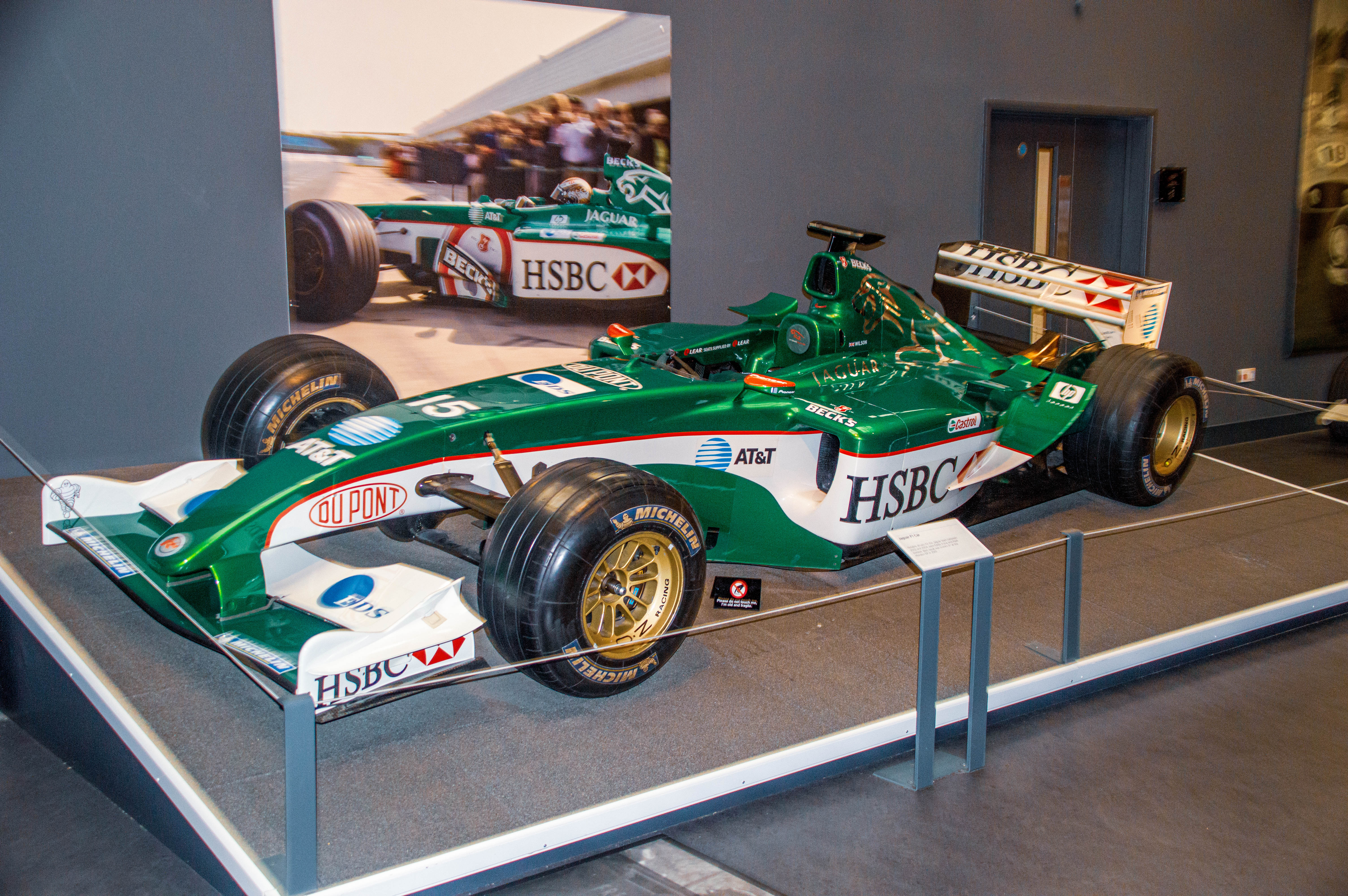
Jaguar R4 at the Coventry Transport Museum

The livery was similar to previous seasons with subtle changes. The bargeboard promoted an all-new XJ.

In Monaco Grand Prix, Jaguar took the unique decision to re-colour its signature-leaping cat pink in celebration of the Steinmetz Flawless Diamond Collection and the presentation of the Steinmetz Pink - a 59.60 carat natural, pink diamond. At the British Grand Prix, both cars had the Terminator 3: Rise of the Machines livery on its air box.

== Complete Formula One results ==
(key)

Year	Team	Engine	Tyres	Drivers	1	2	3	4	5	6	7	8	9	10	11	12	13	14	15	16	Points	WCC
2003	Jaguar	Cosworth V10	M		AUS	MAL	BRA	SMR	ESP	AUT	MON	CAN	EUR	FRA	GBR	GER	HUN	ITA	USA	JPN	18	7th
2003	Jaguar	Cosworth V10	M	Webber	Ret	Ret	9^{†}	Ret	7	7	Ret	7	6	6	14	11^{†}	6	7	Ret	11	18	7th
2003	Jaguar	Cosworth V10	M	Pizzonia	13^{†}	Ret	Ret	14	Ret	9	Ret	10^{†}	10	10	Ret						18	7th
2003	Jaguar	Cosworth V10	M	Wilson												Ret	Ret	Ret	8	13	18	7th
