= Tim Malyon =

British engineer

- Born: August 18, 1978 (age 48); Kentville, Nova Scotia, Canada
- Citizenship: British
- Education: University of Leeds
- Occupation: Engineer
- Employer: FIA
- Title: Sporting Director

Tim Malyon (born 18 August 1978) is a British Formula One and motorsport engineer. He is currently the Sporting Director for the FIA.

== Career ==
Malyon studied at the University of Leeds, graduating with a master's degree in mechatronics in 2001. He began his career with Avante Concepts as a vehicle dynamics engineer before joining Jaguar Racing. In 2004 he became assistant race engineer to Christian Klien, remaining with the Austrian driver when the team transitioned into Red Bull Racing, and also working with Vitantonio Liuzzi. After the 2005 season he moved to the test team as a test engineer, responsible for the build, operation, and performance of the car at test events and for the spare car at race weekends.

In 2008 he rejoined the race team as Race Engineer – Car Performance for David Coulthard, supporting the Scot in his final Formula One season. For 2009, Malyon was part of Sebastian Vettel’s race engineering group, working to optimise car performance and manage set-up throughout race events, contributing to the team’s run of four consecutive Drivers’ Championships from 2010 to 2013. Following Vettel's departure from Red Bull, Malyon moved into a project engineering role coordinating multidisciplinary performance development activities across Red Bull and its power-unit partner Renault.

Malyon joined Sauber Motorsport as Head of Trackside Engineering in 2016, although he remained with the Swiss team only for the opening rounds of the season as it faced significant financial difficulties. He subsequently joined BMW Motorsport as chief engineer in its DTM programme, providing technical leadership to BMW's partner teams competing in the series. In January 2017 he was promoted to Head of Track Engineering, assuming wider responsibility across BMW's motorsport activities, including Formula E, LM GTE, and Group GT3 programmes.

In March 2019, Malyon became Head of Research at the FIA, overseeing an expanding portfolio of safety research projects and focusing on accident-prevention initiatives. He was promoted to Safety Director in September 2021 and later became Sporting Director at the start of 2024, with responsibility for supporting the sporting direction of the FIA's championships, including Formula One.
