= 2003 British Grand Prix =

Coordinates: 52°04′43″N 1°01′01″W

Race 11 of 16 in the 2003 Formula One World Championship
← Previous race	Next race →
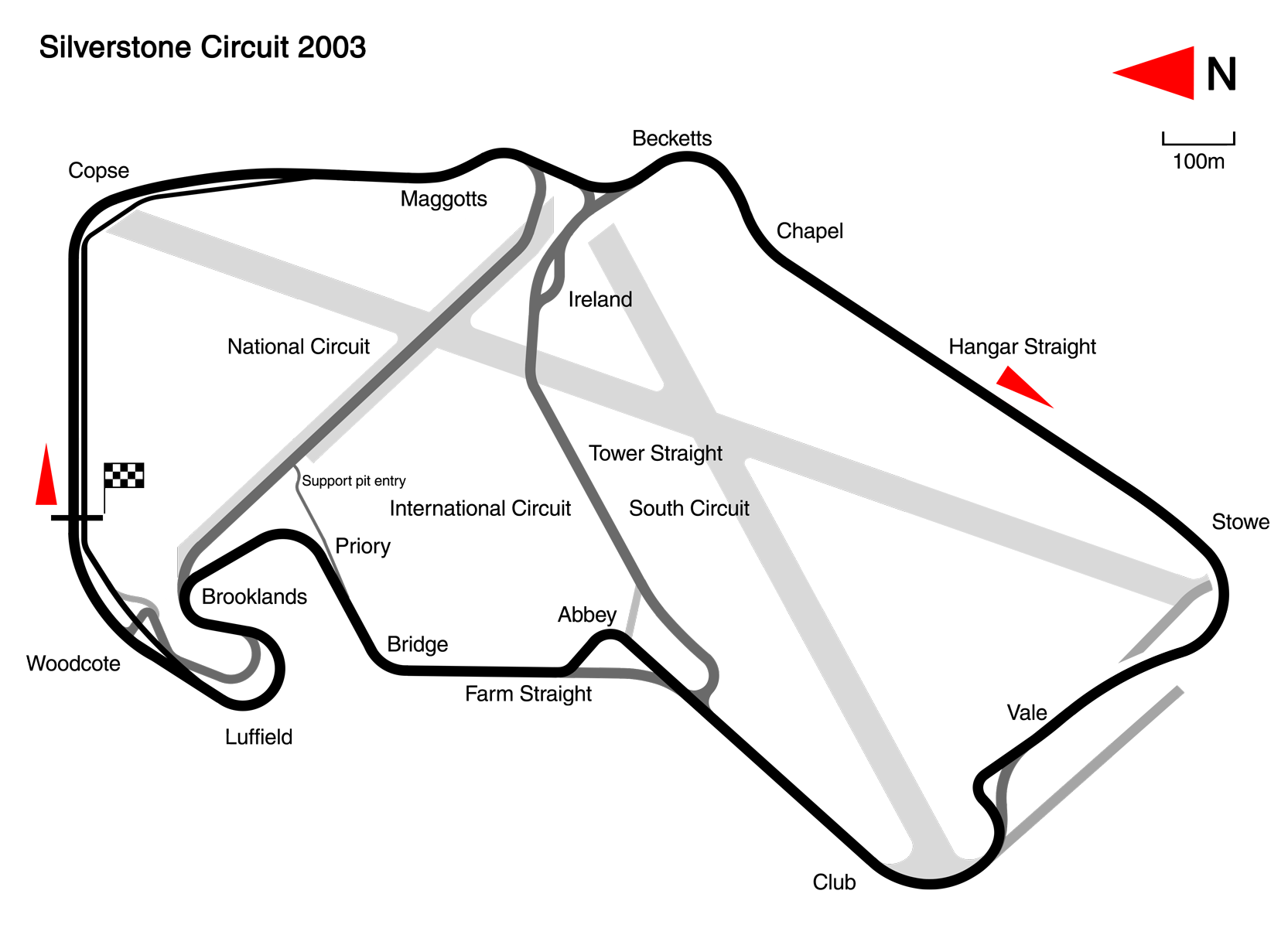
- Silverstone Circuit in its 2003 configuration

Race details
- Date: 20 July 2003
- Official name: 2003 Foster's British Grand Prix
- Location: Silverstone Circuit, Silverstone, Northamptonshire and Buckinghamshire, England
- Course: Permanent Road Facility
- Course length: 5.141 km (3.194 miles)
- Distance: 60 laps, 308.355 km (191.603 miles)
- Weather: Sunny at start, cloudy later, Air: 24 °C (75 °F), Track 29 °C (84 °F)

Pole position
Driver	(Brazil) Rubens Barrichello	Ferrari
- Time: 1:21.209

Fastest lap
Driver	(Brazil) Rubens Barrichello	Ferrari
- Time: 1:22.236 on lap 38

Podium
First	(Brazil) Rubens Barrichello	Ferrari
Second	(Colombia) Juan Pablo Montoya	Williams-BMW
Third	(Finland) Kimi Räikkönen	McLaren-Mercedes

The 2003 British Grand Prix (formally the 2003 Foster's British Grand Prix) was a Formula One motor race held on 20 July 2003 at the Silverstone Circuit, Silverstone, Northamptonshire, England. It was the eleventh round of the 2003 Formula One season. The 60-lap race was won by Rubens Barrichello driving for Ferrari after starting from pole position. Juan Pablo Montoya finished second in a Williams car, and Kimi Räikkönen third driving for McLaren.

Jarno Trulli, driving for Renault, started alongside Barrichello on the front row and led the first eleven laps of the race, until a track invasion by a later-to-be-defrocked priest, who ran along Hangar straight, running opposite to the 170 mph (280 km/h) train of cars, wearing a saffron kilt and waving religious banners. As a result, the vast majority of cars pitted under safety car conditions, which led to the Toyota drivers Cristiano da Matta and Olivier Panis, who had elected not to pit, leading the field until Räikkönen assumed the lead on lap 30 when Da Matta pitted.

== Race report ==
The race began with Ferrari's Rubens Barrichello on pole, alongside Renault's Jarno Trulli. Kimi Räikkönen of McLaren-Mercedes started from third, while world champion and championship leader Michael Schumacher started from fifth. Barrichello made a poor start, allowing both Trulli and Räikkönen past on an incident-free first lap. Ralf and Michael Schumacher retained their starting positions of fourth and fifth. On the sixth lap, the headrest of David Coulthard dislodged while traversing the first corner (Copse), forcing him to pit for a replacement under safety regulations, and causing a safety car period to allow marshals to clear the track. Upon the resumption of green flag racing, Barrichello closed the gap to Räikkönen before passing him on lap 11. On the following lap, a man invaded the circuit and another safety car period was necessitated. As it was close to the period when the drivers would be making their scheduled pit stops, the vast majority of cars decided to pit under the safety car. The second placed cars from the respective teams were forced to queue up in the pit lane waiting for service, causing them to drop many places. Michael Schumacher, Fernando Alonso and Juan Pablo Montoya were all outside of the top ten. Of the leading contenders, Trulli was in fourth place while both Räikkönen and Ralf Schumacher had jumped Barrichello when in the pits.

The Toyotas of Cristiano da Matta and Olivier Panis – who had opted not to pit – were leading, while Coulthard was in third, having not required a pit stop after his earlier unscheduled headrest replacement. Räikkönen passed Trulli immediately after the restart before clearing team-mate Coulthard on the same lap. Barrichello then passed a slowing Ralf Schumacher on the 17th lap while Räikkönen also passed Panis before chasing down the leading da Matta. Ralf Schumacher was forced to pit after encountering difficulties, while at the same time Michael Schumacher was unable to pass Alonso. By the 26th lap Barrichello was still trying to pass Trulli, and the two leaders continued to extend their lead. Barrichello and Montoya eventually passed Trulli by the end of the 27th lap, before Panis fell victim to both on the 29th. Da Matta eventually ceded the lead after pitting on the 30th lap to Räikkönen. Barrichello then set the fastest lap after being cleared of traffic, taking the lead after Räikkönen pitted for the second time. Barrichello continued to cut the advantage, but Räikkönen regained the lead with a reduced margin following the Brazilian's second stop. After closing in, Barrichello passed Räikkönen after pressuring him into a mistake. Michael Schumacher eventually passed Trulli on the 46th lap, but an unforced error by Räikkönen allowed Montoya to seize second position. In the closing phase of the race, Coulthard passed both da Matta and Trulli to earn fifth place.

=== Post-race ===
With Räikkönen outscoring Michael Schumacher in the race, the championship gap closed to seven points, while Montoya was a further seven points behind Räikkönen in third, overtaking teammate Ralf Schumacher as the latter failed to score points for the first time in the season. The result enabled Ferrari to outscore Williams by seven points, to be ten points ahead, with McLaren on 95 points a further 13 points behind in third.

== Track invasion ==
Horan runs onto the track into the path of Antônio Pizzonia's Jaguar R4. Caption on this television screenshot indicates deployment of safety car as a result.

On the 11th lap, as the procession of cars exited the Becketts corner onto the Hangar straight, Neil Horan cleared the fence wearing a kilt, waving banners with statements "Read the bible" and "The Bible is always right", and ran towards the sequence of cars, forcing several cars to swerve to avoid him. He eventually returned to the grass runoff area at the side of the track after the cars had passed for the lap, and was tackled by a track marshal. He was later charged with aggravated trespass and pleaded guilty in a Northampton court, stating that he took the open gate as a sign from God, although the prosecution contended that his act was premeditated as he had already prepared the banners prior to attending the Grand Prix. He was later jailed for two months. Although the incident was broadcast to a worldwide audience, it was not shown live in the UK, as the British broadcaster ITV1 had cut away to a commercial break just as it occurred.

The incident prompted comparisons to the events at the 1977 South African Grand Prix, where volunteer track marshal, Frederick Jansen van Vuuren, ran across the main straight to aid a car and was hit at 170 mph by Tom Pryce, who could not see him until it was too late because of the steep crest on the straight. Both Van Vuuren and Pryce were killed by the impact. A similar incident occurred at the 2000 German Grand Prix (coincidentally won by Barrichello) when a disgruntled ex-Mercedes employee walked along part of the circuit in protest before being arrested. This caused a safety car, forcing drivers to pit, under safety car conditions, which eliminated the lead of Mika Häkkinen, driving for McLaren-Mercedes. Unlike the German protester, Horan ran directly down the middle of the track, and intentionally towards oncoming cars and lurching towards some of them. Stephen Green, the marshal who handled Horan, was later awarded the BARC Browning Medal for "outstanding bravery in tackling a track invader during the 2003 British Grand Prix at Silverstone", the second recipient after David Purley 30 years previously.

The race led to fears that Formula One bosses Max Mosley and Bernie Ecclestone, who had been highly critical of the media and corporate facilities of Silverstone, would use the incident to drop the race from the Formula One calendar, with Ecclestone saying: "It wasn't necessary – the race was exciting enough without it. But the security wasn't good enough." Drivers and team officials defended the circuit, with Montoya stating: "This was one of the best races of the year, even with the spectator. It was so much fun today." Sauber boss Peter Sauber stated: "When a man sets himself on fire in the street in Paris, no one blames Paris". McLaren-Mercedes boss Ron Dennis said: "There is no way you can prevent it happening."

== Classification ==
=== Qualifying ===
Pos	No	Driver	Constructor	Q1 Time	Q2 Time	Gap	Grid
1	2	(Brazil) Rubens Barrichello	Ferrari	No time^{1}	1:21.209	—	1
2	7	(Italy) Jarno Trulli	Renault	1:19.963	1:21.381	+0.172	2
3	6	(Finland) Kimi Räikkönen	McLaren-Mercedes	1:21.065	1:21.695	+0.486	3
4	4	(Germany) Ralf Schumacher	Williams-BMW	1:19.788	1:21.727	+0.518	4
5	1	(Germany) Michael Schumacher	Ferrari	1:19.474	1:21.867	+0.658	5
6	21	(Brazil) Cristiano da Matta	Toyota	1:20.765	1:22.081	+0.872	6
7	3	(Colombia) Juan Pablo Montoya	Williams-BMW	1:19.749	1:22.214	+1.005	7
8	8	(Spain) Fernando Alonso	Renault	1:19.907	1:22.404	+1.195	8
9	16	(Canada) Jacques Villeneuve	BAR-Honda	1:21.084	1:22.591	+1.382	9
10	15	(Brazil) Antônio Pizzonia	Jaguar-Cosworth	1:20.877	1:22.634	+1.425	10
11	14	(Australia) Mark Webber	Jaguar-Cosworth	1:20.171	1:22.647	+1.438	11
12	5	(United Kingdom) David Coulthard	McLaren-Mercedes	1:19.968	1:22.811	+1.602	12
13	20	(France) Olivier Panis	Toyota	1:19.959	1:23.042	+1.833	13
14	10	(Germany) Heinz-Harald Frentzen	Sauber-Petronas	1:21.363	1:23.187	+1.978	14
15	11	(Italy) Giancarlo Fisichella	Jordan-Ford	1:21.500	1:23.574	+2.365	15
16	9	(Germany) Nick Heidfeld	Sauber-Petronas	1:21.211	1:23.844	+2.635	16
17	12	(Republic of Ireland) Ralph Firman	Jordan-Ford	1:22.335	1:24.385	+3.176	17
18	18	(United Kingdom) Justin Wilson	Minardi-Cosworth	No time^{2}	1:25.468	+4.259	18
19	19	(Netherlands) Jos Verstappen	Minardi-Cosworth	1:23.418	1:25.759	+4.550	19
20	17	(United Kingdom) Jenson Button	BAR-Honda	1:20.569	No time^{3}	—	20

Notes

- ^1 – Rubens Barrichello was left without a time in Q1 after driving off the track at turn 15.
- ^2 – Justin Wilson was left without a time in Q1 due to technical problems.
- ^3 – Jenson Button was left without a time in Q2 after hitting the curb at the wrong angle and damaging his left front suspension.

=== Race ===
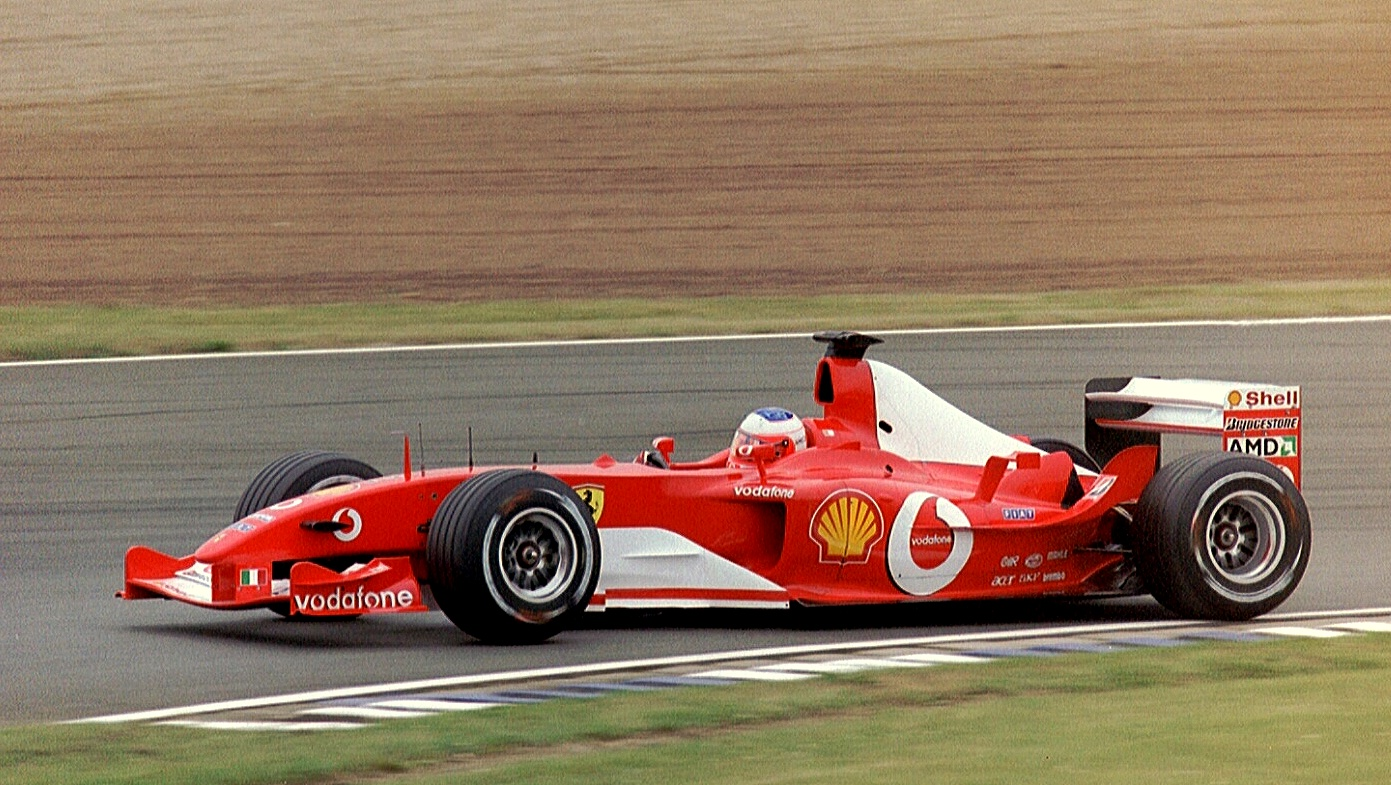
Rubens Barrichello won the race for Scuderia Ferrari.

Pos	No	Driver	Constructor	Tyre	Laps	Time/Retired	Grid	Points
1	2	(Brazil) Rubens Barrichello	Ferrari	B	60	1:28:37.554	1	10
2	3	(Colombia) Juan Pablo Montoya	Williams-BMW	M	60	+5.462	7	8
3	6	(Finland) Kimi Räikkönen	McLaren-Mercedes	M	60	+10.656	3	6
4	1	(Germany) Michael Schumacher	Ferrari	B	60	+25.648	5	5
5	5	(United Kingdom) David Coulthard	McLaren-Mercedes	M	60	+36.827	12	4
6	7	(Italy) Jarno Trulli	Renault	M	60	+43.067	2	3
7	21	(Brazil) Cristiano da Matta	Toyota	M	60	+45.085	6	2
8	17	(United Kingdom) Jenson Button	BAR-Honda	B	60	+45.478	20	1
9	4	(Germany) Ralf Schumacher	Williams-BMW	M	60	+58.032	4	
10	16	(Canada) Jacques Villeneuve	BAR-Honda	B	60	+1:03.569	9	
11	20	(France) Olivier Panis	Toyota	M	60	+1:05.207	13	
12	10	(Germany) Heinz-Harald Frentzen	Sauber-Petronas	B	60	+1:05.564	14	
13	12	(Republic of Ireland) Ralph Firman	Jordan-Ford	B	59	+1 Lap	17	
14	14	(Australia) Mark Webber	Jaguar-Cosworth	M	59	+1 Lap	11	
15	19	(Netherlands) Jos Verstappen	Minardi-Cosworth	B	58	+2 Laps	19	
16	18	(United Kingdom) Justin Wilson	Minardi-Cosworth	B	58	+2 Laps	18	
17	9	(Germany) Nick Heidfeld	Sauber-Petronas	B	58	+2 Laps	16	
Ret	8	(Spain) Fernando Alonso	Renault	M	52	Gearbox	8	
Ret	11	(Italy) Giancarlo Fisichella	Jordan-Ford	B	44	Suspension	15	
Ret	15	(Brazil) Antônio Pizzonia	Jaguar-Cosworth	M	32	Engine	10	

== Championship standings after the race ==
Drivers' Championship standings

+/–	Pos	Driver	Points
	1	(Germany) **Michael Schumacher***	69
	2	(Finland) **Kimi Räikkönen***	62
1	3	(Colombia) **Juan Pablo Montoya***	55
1	4	(Germany) **Ralf Schumacher***	53
	5	(Brazil) **Rubens Barrichello***	49

Constructors' Championship standings

+/–	Pos	Constructor	Points
	1	(Italy) **Ferrari***	118
	2	(United Kingdom) **Williams-BMW***	108
	3	(United Kingdom) **McLaren-Mercedes***	95
	4	(France) **Renault***	55
	5	(United Kingdom) BAR-Honda	14

- Note: Only the top five positions are included for both sets of standings.
- Competitors in bold and marked with an asterisk still had a theoretical chance of becoming World Champion.

Previous race: 2003 French Grand Prix	FIA Formula One World Championship; 2003 season	Next race: 2003 German Grand Prix
Previous race: 2002 British Grand Prix	British Grand Prix	Next race: 2004 British Grand Prix
