= Tony Purnell =

British businessman (born 1958)

- Born: 23 May 1958 (age 68); Carshalton, Surrey, England
- Citizenship: United Kingdom
- Education: Manchester University, MIT Sloan School of Management
- Occupation: businessman

Anthony John Purnell (born 23 May 1958 in Carshalton, Surrey) is an English engineering entrepreneur, and former principal of the Jaguar and Red Bull Formula One teams.

== Pre-motorsport career ==
Before entering motorsports, Purnell had a lengthy academic career in England and the United States. A pupil of The John Fisher School, he gained a scholarship to study mechanical engineering at Manchester University in the 1970s: then won the Kennedy Scholarship at the MIT School of Engineering where he completed his master's degree. His dissertation was on the subject of Formula One aerodynamics.

After MIT, Purnell returned to the United Kingdom as a researcher at Cambridge University working on whole field continuous velocity determination in fluid flow. He did not complete his PhD, but began work on wind tunnel hardware and analysis software for the Lola organisation and consulted for the short-lived FORCE F1 team.

Purnell went on to found Pi Research (and its later spin-off Pi Technology) and by the late 1990s had built the company into a highly successful global electronics business. In 1999 this company was purchased by the Ford Motor Company making Purnell a multi-millionaire. Still under Purnell's management, Pi Research was made part of Ford's Premiere Performance Division alongside Cosworth and the Jaguar Formula One team.

== Motorsport career ==
By 2002 the Jaguar team had failed to live up to its early promise under the direction of Neil Ressler, Bobby Rahal and finally Niki Lauda. In late 2002 the Austrian was unceremoniously dumped by Ford who now required a new principal for their flagship motor sport brand. Purnell was given the job, and alongside fellow countryman David Pitchforth, immediately set about restoring the team's fortunes.

The next two seasons saw a gradual improvement in results as Australian Mark Webber was signed to replace Eddie Irvine, and management stability began to pay dividends, but with parent company Ford needing to make financial savings the team's future was uncertain. By late 2004, after a series of budget cuts, Ford announced their withdrawal from Formula One placing Jaguar Racing, Pi Research and Cosworth up for sale.

With Jaguar's future now in serious doubt Purnell set about trying to locate a new owner, and on 15 November 2004 Red Bull announced that they had purchased the team. Red Bull Racing was born and new team owner Dietrich Mateschitz appeared to give his backing for Purnell to continue in his role of team principal.

The period of stability which Purnell had striven to achieve at Jaguar was short-lived however. By 7 January 2005 it had been announced that F3000 team owner Christian Horner would succeed him as principal and he left the team.

Numerous rumors surfaced linking Purnell to other Formula One teams, but in December 2006 it was announced that Purnell would return to the sport as a technical consultant to the governing body, the FIA. In addition to his FIA role he held the position of Royal Academy of Engineering Visiting Professor at the Engineering Department of Cambridge University and became a Fellow Commoner of Trinity Hall College.

In 2010, Purnell left the FIA and became part of the IndyCar Series' ICONIC committee which chose new engine and chassis specifications for the 2012 season.

== Cycling career ==
In May 2013 Purnell joined British Cycling as head of its much-vaunted "Secret Squirrel Club" responsible for technical development, succeeding Chris Boardman. At the time he was a keen racing cyclist competing in UK events.

The 2016 Rio Olympic Games was a notable success for the GB cycling team with six gold, four silver and two bronze medals. Perhaps more significantly (from a technical point of view) was the tally of World and Olympic records for all velodrome events against the clock.

In September 2017 the Royal Academy of Engineering announced that Purnell had been elected a Fellow.

== Personal life ==
Purnell is married to Alison and has two children, Lucy and Oliver.
