= 2004 United States Grand Prix =

Coordinates: 39°47′42″N 86°14′05″W

Race 9 of 18 in the 2004 Formula One World Championship
← Previous race	Next race →

Race details
- Date: June 20, 2004
- Official name: 2004 Formula 1 United States Grand Prix
- Location: Indianapolis Motor Speedway; Speedway, Indiana
- Course: Permanent racing facility
- Course length: 4.195 km (2.606 miles)
- Distance: 73 laps, 306.016 km (190.238 miles)
- Weather: Fine with temperatures reaching up to 24 °C (75 °F); Wind speeds up to 20.55 km/h (12.77 mph)
- Attendance: 92,000

Pole position
Driver	(Brazil) Rubens Barrichello	Ferrari
- Time: 1:10.223

Fastest lap
Driver	(Brazil) Rubens Barrichello	Ferrari
- Time: 1:10.399 on lap 7 (lap record)

Podium
First	(Germany) Michael Schumacher	Ferrari
Second	(Brazil) Rubens Barrichello	Ferrari
Third	(Japan) Takuma Sato	BAR-Honda

The 2004 United States Grand Prix (officially the 2004 Formula 1 United States Grand Prix) was a Formula One motor race held on June 20, 2004, at the Indianapolis Motor Speedway in Speedway, Indiana. It was Race 9 of 18 in the 2004 FIA Formula One World Championship.

Rubens Barrichello started from pole position in his Ferrari ahead of teammate Michael Schumacher. However, following a start-line incident between five cars, four of whom retired as a result, Schumacher overtook Barrichello on the safety car restart on lap six, and despite a threat from Barrichello after the final pit stops, Schumacher held on to take his eighth win of the season. Takuma Sato became only the second Japanese driver to achieve a podium finish after Aguri Suzuki. This was Takumo Sato's only podium finish in F1.

The race saw two serious accidents caused by Michelin tyre failures in what would be a precedent for the 2005 United States Grand Prix, at which all Michelin-shod cars withdrew over safety concerns. First, Fernando Alonso's Renault crashed into the barriers alongside the end of the pit straight on lap nine. Later, Ralf Schumacher's Williams suffered the same fate, but in the most dangerous part of the track, causing him to hit the wall at a ninety-degree angle rearwards. The impact left Schumacher with spinal fractures and a concussion, which prevented him from racing until the 2004 Chinese Grand Prix, three months later.

This was the last US Grand Prix race that featured a US-owned Formula One team until 2016 when Haas debuted as newly-formed US Formula One team.

== Report ==
=== Background ===
Heading into round nine, the season had so far belonged to Michael Schumacher, driving for Ferrari, winning all but one race, in Monaco, owing to a crash with Juan Pablo Montoya, and so had 70 points out of a possible 80. However, Rubens Barrichello, Schumacher's teammate at Ferrari, was only 16 points behind him, having taken six podiums and two other points finishes. In the Constructors' Championship, however, Ferrari were dominating, with 124 points: more than double that of second-placed Renault, the only other team to win a Grand Prix that year so far, with Jarno Trulli triumphing in Monaco. Third-placed BAR had a quick car, but suffered reliability problems. Lead driver Jenson Button, like his future teammate Barrichello, picking up six podiums and two other points finishes. However, of the eight races so far, Takuma Sato, in the other BAR, had suffered five engine failures, three of which had occurred in the preceding three Grands Prix in Monaco, Europe, and Canada.

Williams and Toyota had been disqualified from the last event in Canada for illegal brake ducts, even though, in Williams's case, this proved to be a manufacturing error and had not given them any aerodynamic or cooling gain.

=== Friday drivers ===
The bottom 6 teams in the 2003 Constructors' Championship were entitled to run a third car in free practice on Friday. These drivers drove on Friday but did not compete in qualifying or the race.

Constructor	Nat	Driver
BAR-Honda	(United Kingdom)	Anthony Davidson
Sauber-Petronas		-
Jaguar-Cosworth	(Sweden)	Björn Wirdheim
Toyota	(Brazil)	Ricardo Zonta
Jordan-Ford	(Germany)	Timo Glock
Minardi-Cosworth	(Belgium)	Bas Leinders

=== Practice ===
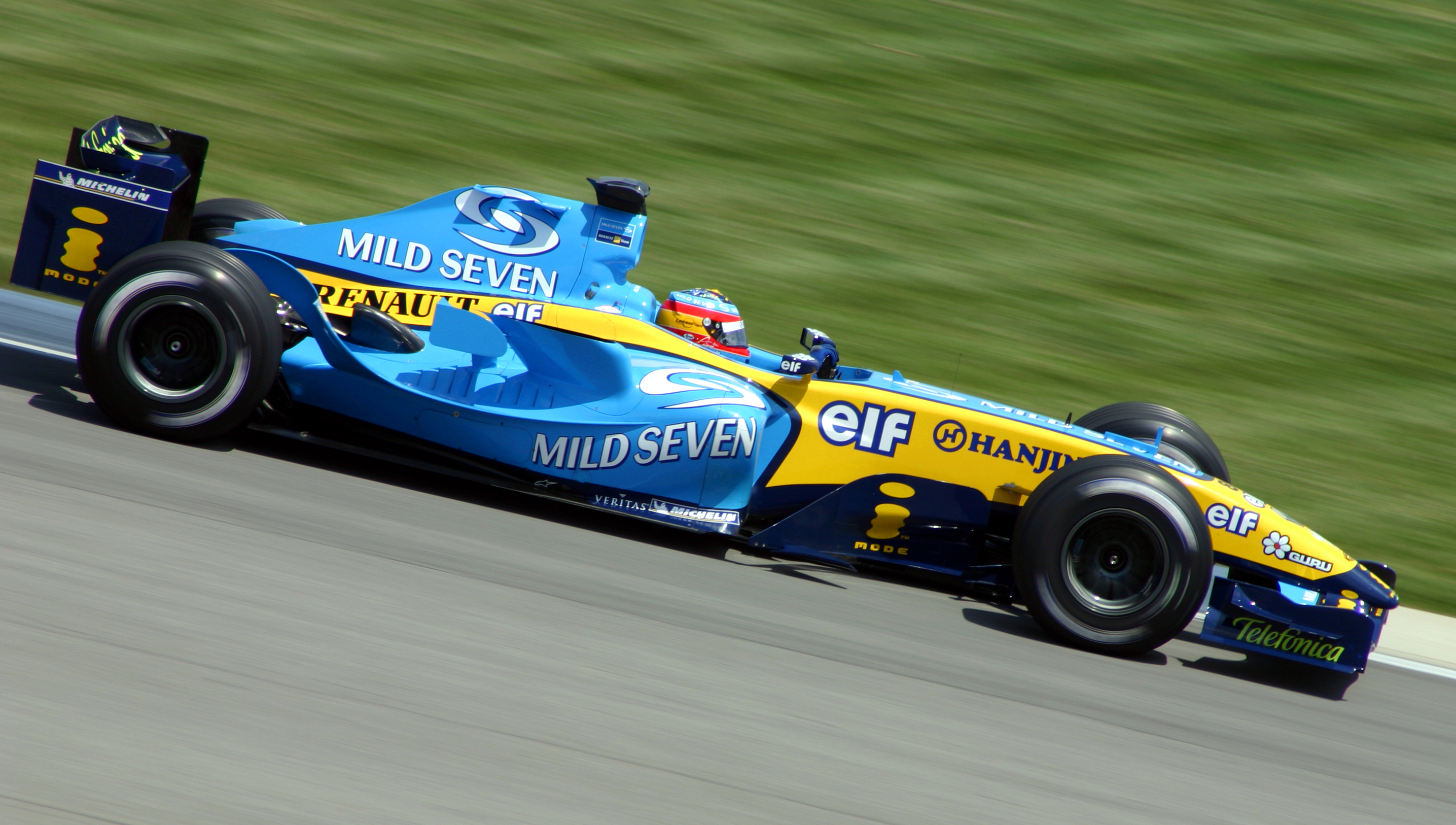
Fernando Alonso during free practice.

Four practice sessions were held before qualifying - two 60-minute sessions on Friday and two 45-minute sessions on Saturday. All of the teams, with the exception of Ferrari, Williams, McLaren, and Renault, were permitted to run three drivers on Friday. Rubens Barrichello topped the timesheets in practices one, two, and three, with times of 1:11.354, 1:10.365, and 1:10.911 respectively. Jenson Button, driving for BAR, however, prevented Barrichello from a clean sweep in the second Saturday session: his time of 1:10.056 was 0.143 quicker than second-placed Michael Schumacher. Third was Takuma Sato, Button's teammate, whilst Barrichello languished in fourth. However, despite the pace of the Ferraris, their Bridgestone tires had grained in the long runs, meaning that balls of rubber would form on the surface of the tire, reducing mechanical grip.

=== Qualifying ===
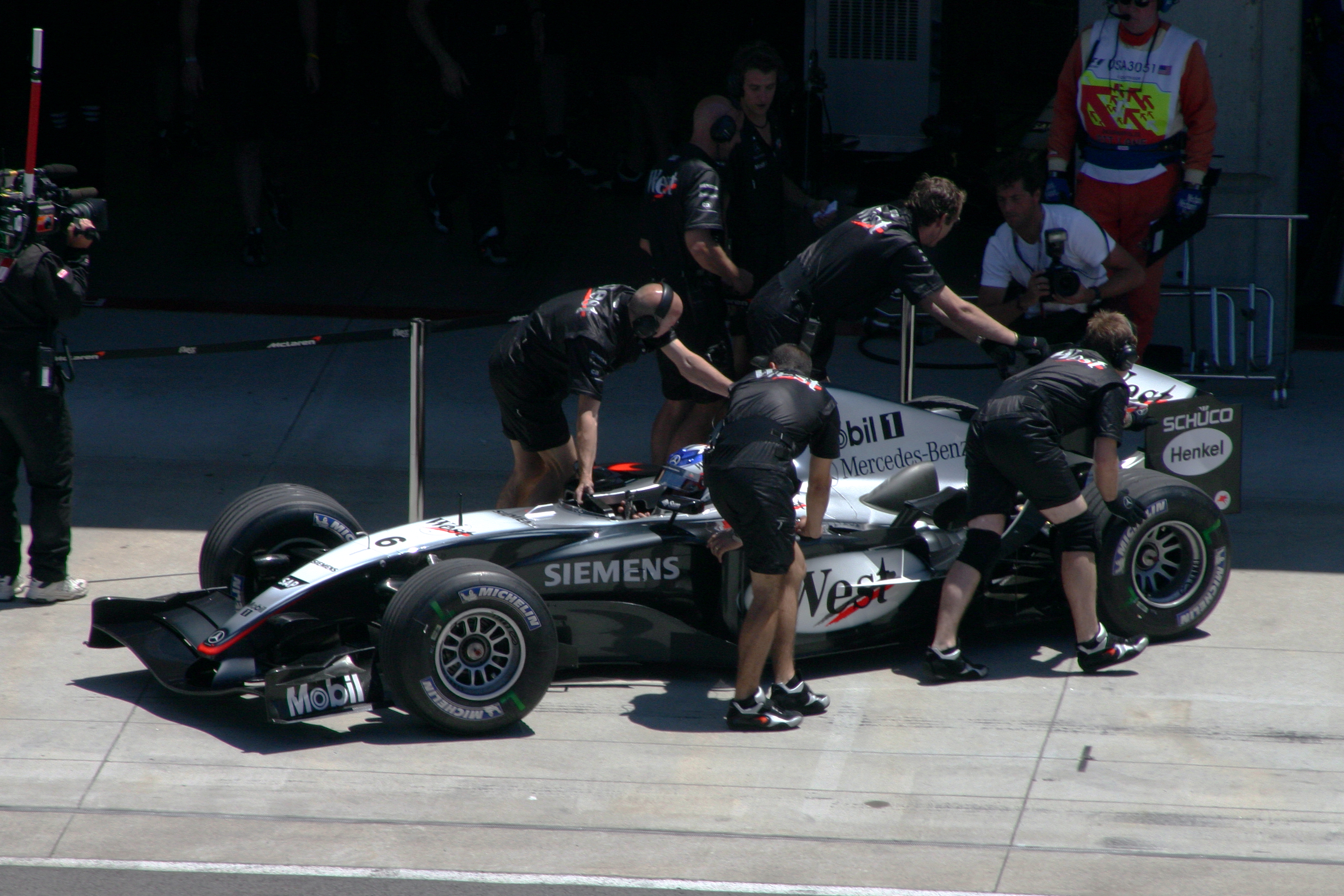
The McLaren mechanics push Kimi Räikkönen's MP4-19 into the garage during qualifying.

Qualifying was split into two sections. In the first session, dubbed "pre-qualifying", each driver took turns to record one lap at a time. The order the cars ran in was the reverse order to the classified results at the 2004 Canadian Grand Prix. For example, Michael Schumacher won the race, so would be the last car to run in pre-qualifying. The second qualifying session (dubbed "qualifying") repeated this process (with the drivers running in reverse order to the pre-qualifying results), but with the caveat that the drivers would not be allowed to alter their fuel loads between then and the race. The fastest time in the second session would take pole. As in 2003, setups and fuel loads could not be altered between the end of the second qualifying session and the race. Rubens Barrichello started from pole from teammate Michael Schumacher after setting a time of 1:10:223. Michael Schumacher started second, making it an all-Ferrari front row. BAR locked out the second row, with Takuma Sato lining up ahead of team leader Jenson Button. Williams locked out row three, with Juan Pablo Montoya in fifth, ahead of Ralf Schumacher. A gearbox issue prevented Jarno Trulli in the Renault from setting a lap, meaning he started last. Jean Todt had told the media that Barrichello would be allowed to race Schumacher and would not be forced to concede to him, as in the 2002 Austrian Grand Prix.

=== Race ===
As the formation lap began, Montoya's Williams failed to start. Montoya jumped out of the car and ran to the pits to use the spare car; it was set up for him as he was higher up on the grid than his teammate. Montoya started the race from the pit lane.

Rubens Barrichello led into the first corner from pole position ahead of team-mate Michael Schumacher. Fernando Alonso started in ninth place on the grid, but went around the outside of the similarly fast-starting Kimi Räikkönen in the McLaren, and then used the inside line at turn two to pass Takuma Sato and move into third place. Jenson Button dropped from fourth to sixth, whilst Ralf Schumacher dropped to seventh. Jarno Trulli moved up to eleventh place, having started last, partially helped by a big crash in turn two. A gear selection issue for Cristiano da Matta meant that he lost momentum, and an unsighted Christian Klien ploughed into the back of him and speared across the track, hitting Giorgio Pantano's Jordan and Felipe Massa's Sauber. Nick Heidfeld in the other Jordan attempted to avoid the chaos, and squeezed Gianmaria Bruni's Minardi onto the kerb, terminally damaging the suspension of the Minardi. The safety car was deployed, and remained out until the end of lap five.

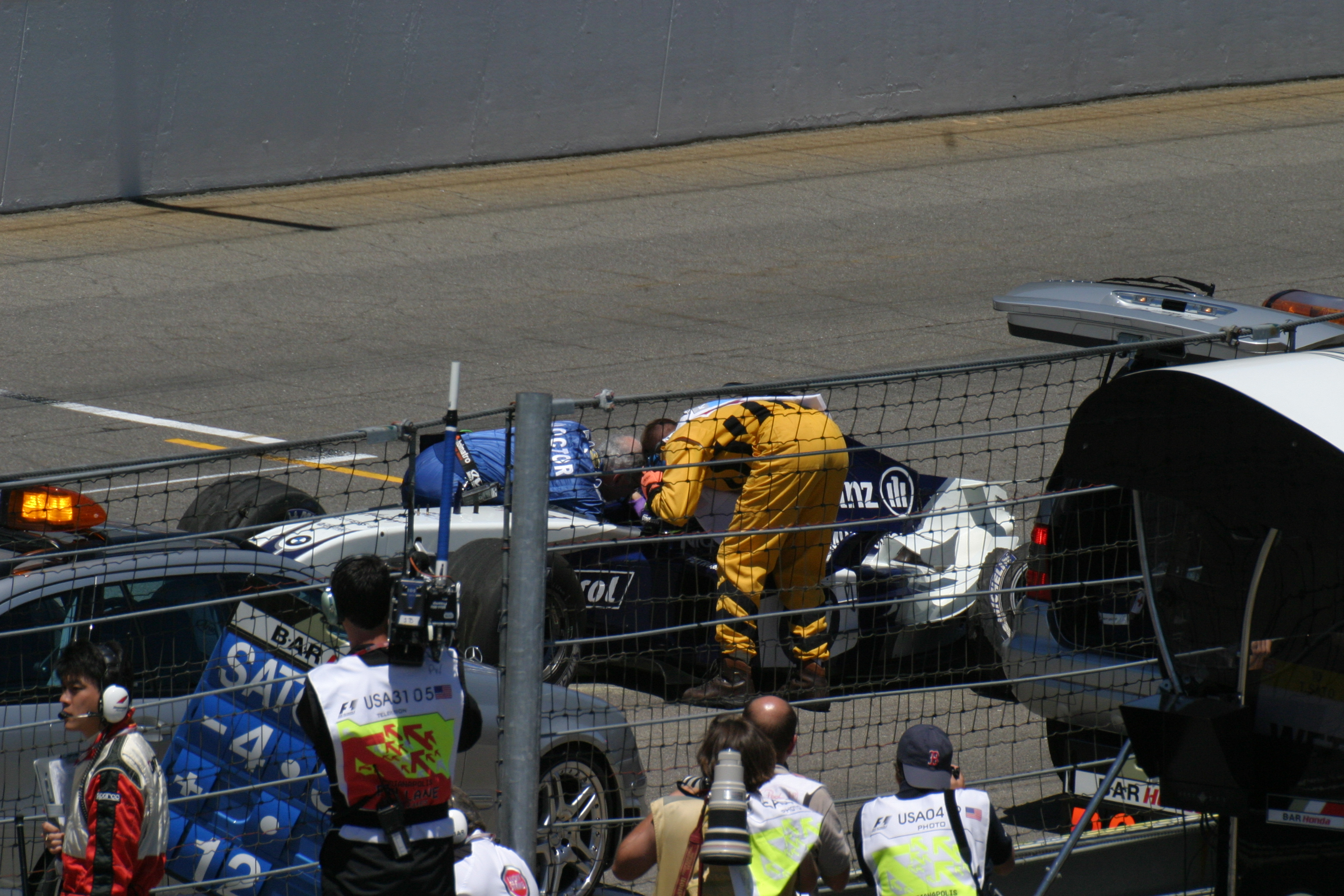
Ralf Schumacher is attended to by Gary Hartstein after impacting the wall out the outside of turn thirteen on lap ten.

As the safety car came in, Michael Schumacher overtook Barrichello for the lead of the race. On lap nine, Fernando Alonso, in a Michelin-shod Renault, crashed out from third place at the end of the main straight after his right rear tyre deflated under braking. He lost control of the car and it crashed nose-first into the barriers along the track, destroying the front end of the Renault and some polystyrene boards at turn one. Double yellow flags were deployed, meaning the drivers were not allowed to overtake in that zone. At the end of lap ten, the Williams of Ralf Schumacher, also on Michelin tyres, suffered a tyre failure in turn thirteen, the only banked corner at the time in Formula One, backing the car into the wall at a ninety-degree angle. The car skidded several hundred metres down the race track before coming to rest. Schumacher sat motionless in the car for two minutes, unable to talk to his team over the radio, as the radio had been smashed in the incident. The safety car was deployed, and most of the drivers opted to make an early pit stop. Michael Schumacher pitted, as did his teammate Barrichello, but Barrichello had to queue behind Schumacher, and also struggled to get going from the stop, costing him track position to Kimi Räikkönen, who also pitted. As he left the pit lane, David Coulthard ran over a piece of debris from Alonso's Renault. Michael Schumacher now led the race from Takuma Sato, Jenson Button, and Juan Pablo Montoya, none of whom had made a pit stop. Kimi Räikkönen was now fifth, ahead of Barrichello in sixth, Trulli in seventh place, and Olivier Panis in the last points position in eighth.

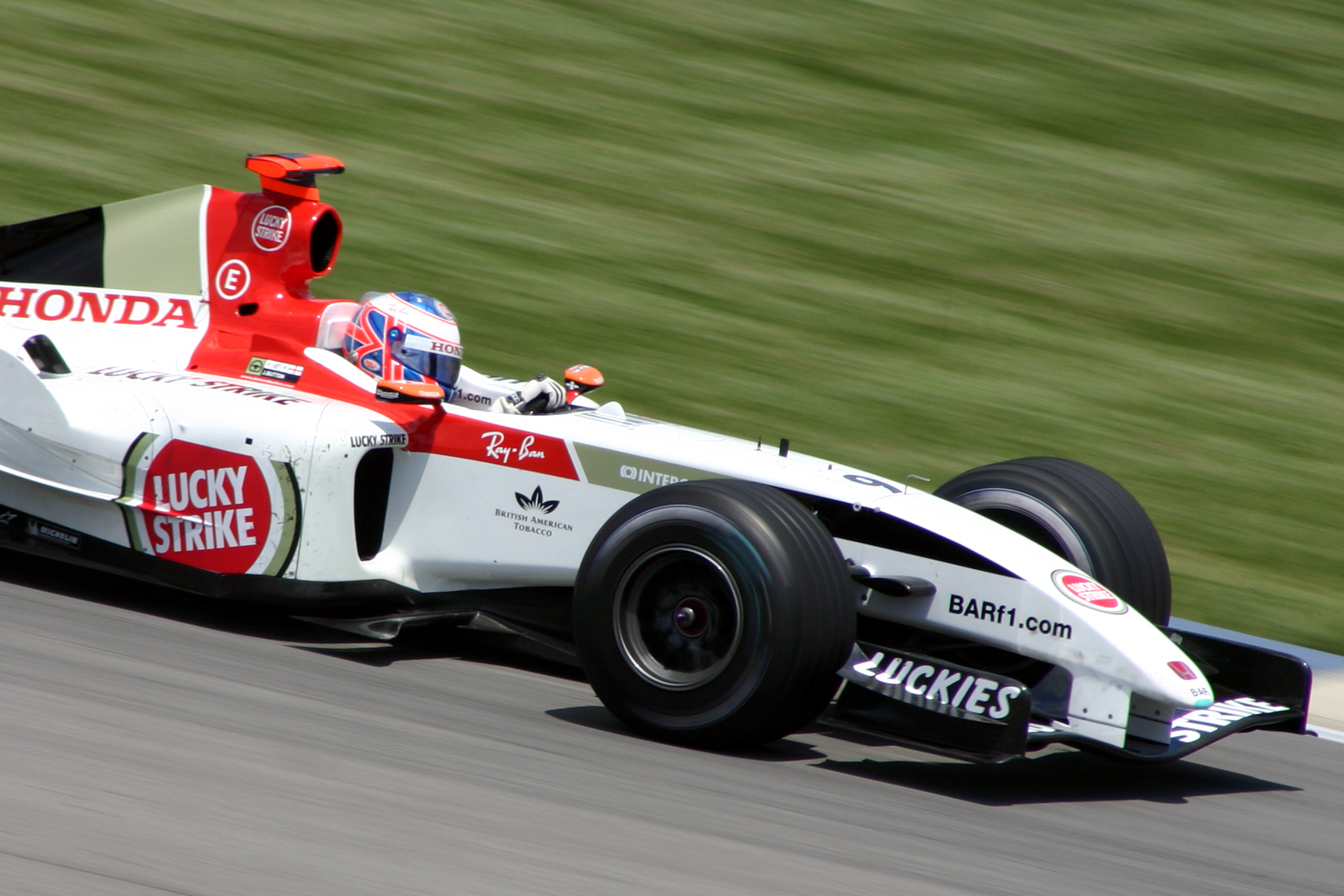
Jenson Button's BAR retired due to a gearbox problem.

The safety car pulled in at the end of lap nineteen, and as the BARs had not stopped, they were pressuring Michael Schumacher's much heavier Ferrari: the top three were within two seconds of each other for a long period of time. Takuma Sato was very quick through the first and second sectors of the lap, but Michael Schumacher's Ferrari had good traction out of turn eleven, the only overtaking opportunity, and so Sato was unable to pass. On lap 24, Button was the first BAR to make a pit stop. Button's arrival in his pit box was messy, causing him to lose a couple of seconds whilst his mechanics readjusted their positions. Sato pitted one lap later, and had a clean stop, rejoining in eleventh place, just in front of Button in twelfth. Sato had good traction, however, out of turn seven on his out lap, and overtook Mark Webber's Jaguar to move up to tenth. On the same lap, he overtook Coulthard through turn thirteen, finishing off the move into turn one on lap twenty seven. Mark Webber ran wide at turn one, gifting a place to Button. However, BAR's reliability problems continued: Button retired at the end of lap 27 with a gearbox issue. On lap 29, Sato repeated his move on Webber on Giancarlo Fisichella, and moved into a points position. A few corners later, he passed Nick Heidfeld and moved into seventh.

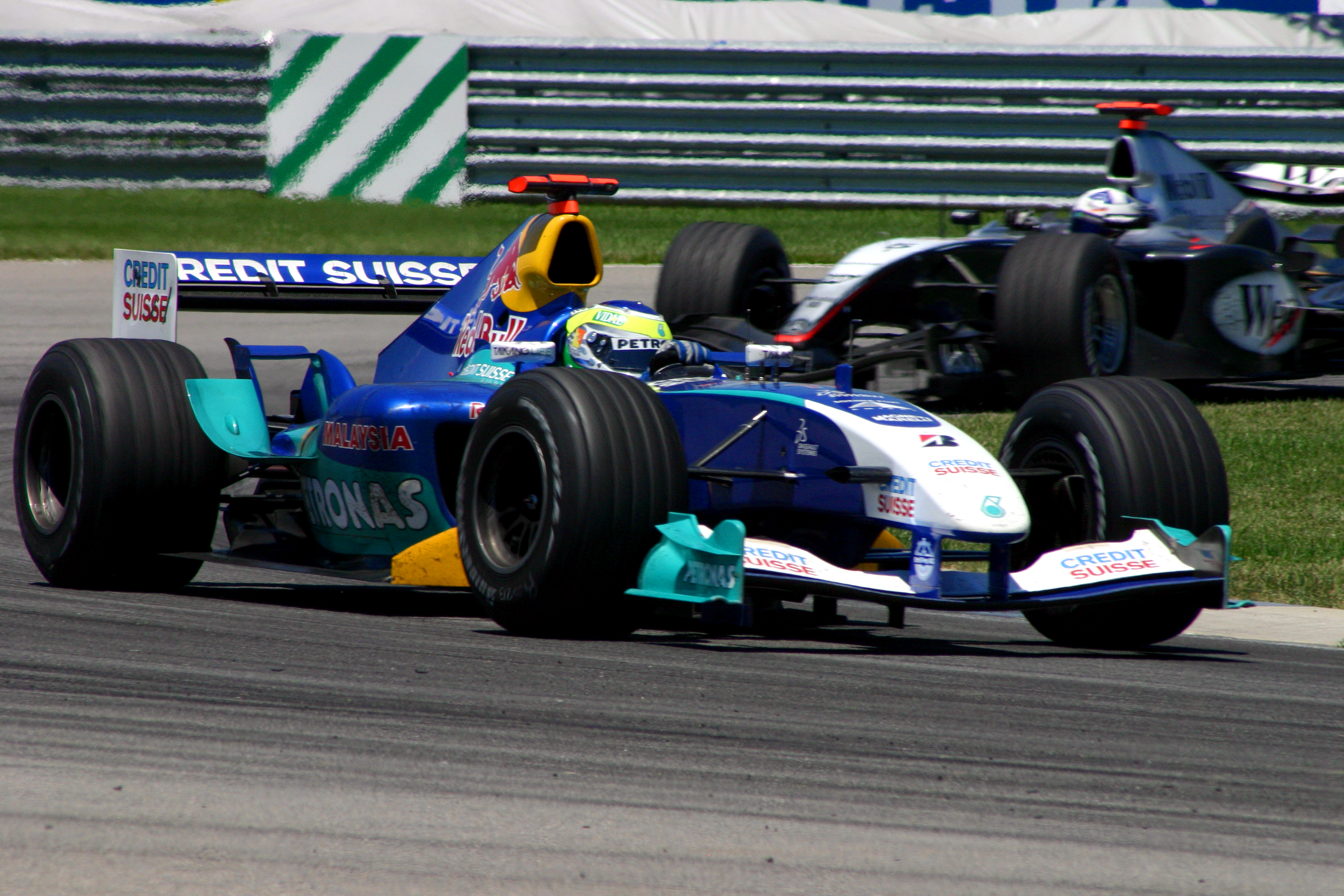
David Coulthard battles Giancarlo Fisichella for eighth place.

Räikkönen made his second stop of the race at the end of lap 29, rejoining in eleventh place, behind Webber. On lap 31, he moved past Webber, and into tenth place, behind Coulthard. One lap later, the McLarens swapped positions, as Räikkönen moved into ninth. However, Räikkönen had to make yet another pit stop at the end of lap 34 due to an electronics problem on his car. The stop lasted fifteen seconds and he rejoined last. Montoya made his first pit stop at the end of lap 35, rejoining in sixth.

Michael Schumacher now led the race by thirteen seconds from Rubens Barrichello, and continued to pull away. Trulli, now in third place, drove sharply over the kerb at turn eight and lost a piece of his car on lap 38. Nick Heidfeld pitted at the end of lap 38 and rejoined the race in eleventh. Sato, meanwhile, had caught Panis' Toyota, and overtook him on lap 40 for fourth place. Schumacher pitted at the end of lap 42 with a fifteen-second gap to his teammate, and Barrichello assumed the lead. Schumacher's 10.3-second stop fuelled him to get to the end of the race. Barrichello then pushed hard, attempting to leapfrog Schumacher. Heidfeld retired on lap 45, and Sato pitted on the same lap for his second and final pit stop. Sato rejoined in sixth place, behind Montoya. Jarno Trulli pitted on lap 46 and rejoined in fifth place, behind Olivier Panis, although that quickly changed when Panis pitted at the end of lap 47. Panis rejoined behind Sato, and Coulthard pitted on the same lap for McLaren, rejoining in ninth.

Fisichella, on Bridgestone tyres, then suffered a left rear puncture on lap 49. He took the opportunity to make his final fuel stop, rejoining near the back of the field. Barrichello had been pushing hard, and so when he finally stopped for fuel on lap 51, the gap between the two Ferraris had been cut to approximately two seconds - Barrichello had cut the gap by approximately thirteen seconds. On lap 52, Barrichello went up the inside of Schumacher in turn four, but Schumacher cut across the front of his teammate. The two cars nearly collided, and Barrichello then, contrary to Todt's earlier statements, was told to remain behind Schumacher. The battle between the two Ferraris meant that Montoya and Trulli were catching them. Sato was, in turn, catching Trulli for fourth place. David Coulthard pitted on lap 55, and, similarly to Button, had a messy arrival. Montoya pitted on lap 56, but as he left the pit lane, he was disqualified from the race due to him changing cars too late on the grid; it was his second consecutive disqualification. Mark Webber's engine expired on lap 60, and he coasted down the pit straight, pulling off at turn one. Takuma Sato went down the inside of Jarno Trulli on lap 61, and although they both ran on the grass, Sato moved up into third position. In attempting to recover from the excursion, Trulli spun. With eight laps to go, Fisichella retired with a hydraulics problem.

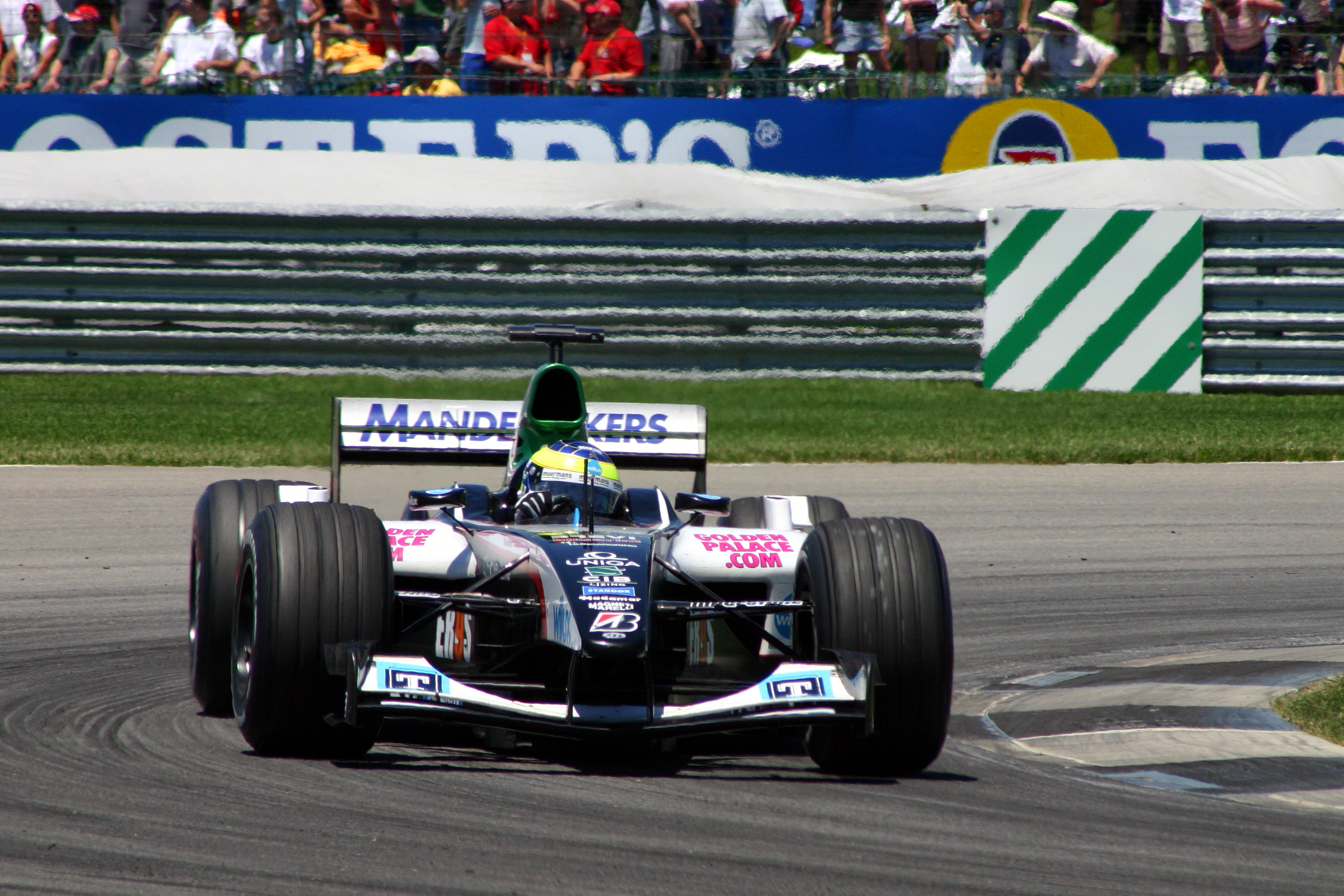
Zsolt Baumgartner became the first, and only Hungarian driver in Formula One to score a point.

Michael Schumacher held off the threat of Barrichello to win the race, his eighth win of 2004. Barrichello finished second, and Takuma Sato became only the second Japanese driver to achieve a podium finish after Aguri Suzuki, a feat not repeated until Kamui Kobayashi in the 2012 Japanese Grand Prix. Jarno Trulli finished fourth, Panis fifth, Räikkönen sixth, and Coulthard seventh; finally, Zsolt Baumgartner became the first, and as of 2025, only Hungarian driver to score a point in a Formula One race by finishing eighth.

=== Post-race ===
Christian Klien did not claim responsibility for the crash on lap one, claiming that he had "nowhere to go". Barrichello was disappointed to have conceded the lead on the safety car restart and criticised the Ferrari technicians for indecision regarding his first pit stop, which lost him position to Kimi Räikkönen.

Juan Pablo Montoya was frustrated to have lost points for the second race running due to a disqualification beyond his control. However, he said that the pace of the car was positive and allowed Williams to push on for the rest of the season.

== Classification ==
=== Qualifying ===
Pos	No	Driver	Constructor	Q1 Time	Q2 Time	Gap	Grid
1	2	(Brazil) Rubens Barrichello	Ferrari	1:09.454	1:10.223	—	1
2	1	(Germany) Michael Schumacher	Ferrari	1:10.129	1:10.400	+0.177	2
3	10	(Japan) Takuma Sato	BAR-Honda	1:10.002	1:10.601	+0.378	3
4	9	(United Kingdom) Jenson Button	BAR-Honda	1:10.115	1:10.820	+0.597	4
5	3	(Colombia) Juan Pablo Montoya	Williams-BMW	1:09.824	1:11.062	+0.839	5
6	4	(Germany) Ralf Schumacher	Williams-BMW	1:10.003	1:11.106	+0.883	6
7	6	(Finland) Kimi Räikkönen	McLaren-Mercedes	1:11.415	1:11.137	+0.914	7
8	17	(France) Olivier Panis	Toyota	1:09.923	1:11.167	+0.944	8
9	8	(Spain) Fernando Alonso	Renault	1:10.078	1:11.185	+0.962	9
10	14	(Australia) Mark Webber	Jaguar-Cosworth	1:11.444	1:11.286	+1.063	10
11	16	(Brazil) Cristiano da Matta	Toyota	1:10.108	1:11.691	+1.468	11
12	5	(United Kingdom) David Coulthard	McLaren-Mercedes	1:11.068	1:12.026	+1.803	12
13	15	(Austria) Christian Klien	Jaguar-Cosworth	1:11.777	1:12.170	+1.947	13
14	11	(Italy) Giancarlo Fisichella	Sauber-Petronas	1:10.997	1:12.470	+2.247	14
15	12	(Brazil) Felipe Massa	Sauber-Petronas	1:11.315	1:12.721	+2.498	15
16	18	(Germany) Nick Heidfeld	Jordan-Ford	1:12.329	1:13.147	+2.924	16
17	19	(Italy) Giorgio Pantano	Jordan-Ford	1:12.017	1:13.375	+3.152	17
18	20	(Italy) Gianmaria Bruni	Minardi-Cosworth	1:13.776	1:14.010	+3.787	18
19	21	(Hungary) Zsolt Baumgartner	Minardi-Cosworth	1:14.396	1:14.812	+4.589	19
20	7	(Italy) Jarno Trulli	Renault	1:10.559	No time^{1}		20

Notes

- ^1 – Jarno Trulli was left without a time in Q2 due to a gearbox failure.

=== Race ===
Pos	No	Driver	Constructor	Tyre	Laps	Time/Retired	Grid	Points
1	1	(Germany) Michael Schumacher	Ferrari	B	73	1:40:29.914	2	10
2	2	(Brazil) Rubens Barrichello	Ferrari	B	73	+2.950	1	8
3	10	(Japan) Takuma Sato	BAR-Honda	M	73	+22.036	3	6
4	7	(Italy) Jarno Trulli	Renault	M	73	+34.544	20	5
5	17	(France) Olivier Panis	Toyota	M	73	+37.534	8	4
6	6	(Finland) Kimi Räikkönen	McLaren-Mercedes	M	72	+1 Lap	7	3
7	5	(United Kingdom) David Coulthard	McLaren-Mercedes	M	72	+1 Lap	12	2
8	21	(Hungary) Zsolt Baumgartner	Minardi-Cosworth	B	70	+3 Laps	19	1
9	11	(Italy) Giancarlo Fisichella	Sauber-Petronas	B	65	Hydraulics	14	
Ret	14	(Australia) Mark Webber	Jaguar-Cosworth	M	60	Oil leak	10	
Ret	18	(Germany) Nick Heidfeld	Jordan-Ford	B	43	Engine	16	
Ret	9	(United Kingdom) Jenson Button	BAR-Honda	M	26	Gearbox	4	
Ret	16	(Brazil) Cristiano da Matta	Toyota	M	17	Gearbox	11	
Ret	4	(Germany) Ralf Schumacher	Williams-BMW	M	9	Puncture/Accident	6	
Ret	8	(Spain) Fernando Alonso	Renault	M	8	Puncture	9	
Ret	15	(Austria) Christian Klien	Jaguar-Cosworth	M	0	Collision	13	
Ret	12	(Brazil) Felipe Massa	Sauber-Petronas	B	0	Collision	15	
Ret	19	(Italy) Giorgio Pantano	Jordan-Ford	B	0	Collision	17	
Ret	20	(Italy) Gianmaria Bruni	Minardi-Cosworth	B	0	Collision	18	
DSQ	3	(Colombia) Juan Pablo Montoya	Williams-BMW	M	57	Illegal car change^{3}	PL^{2}	

Notes

- ^2 – Juan Pablo Montoya started the race from the pitlane.
- ^3 – Montoya was disqualified from the Grand Prix for changing cars after the formation lap had started.

== Championship standings after the race ==
Drivers' Championship standings

Pos	Driver	Points
1	(Germany) Michael Schumacher	80
2	(Brazil) Rubens Barrichello	62
3	(United Kingdom) Jenson Button	44
4	(Italy) Jarno Trulli	41
5	(Spain) Fernando Alonso	25

Constructors' Championship standings

Pos	Constructor	Points
1	(Italy) Ferrari	142
2	(France) Renault	66
3	(United Kingdom) BAR-Honda	58
4	(United Kingdom) Williams-BMW	36
5	(United Kingdom) McLaren-Mercedes	17

- Note: Only the top five positions are included for both sets of standings.

Previous race: 2004 Canadian Grand Prix	FIA Formula One World Championship; 2004 season	Next race: 2004 French Grand Prix
Previous race: 2003 United States Grand Prix	United States Grand Prix	Next race: 2005 United States Grand Prix
