= Jaguar Racing (Formula One) =

Motorsports racing team

Jaguar
- Full name: Jaguar Racing F1 Team
- Base: Milton Keynes, United Kingdom
- Noted staff: David Pitchforth; Tony Purnell; Niki Lauda; Bobby Rahal; Guenther Steiner
- Noted drivers: (United Kingdom) Eddie Irvine (Spain) Pedro de la Rosa (Australia) Mark Webber (United Kingdom) Justin Wilson (Austria) Christian Klien
- Previous name: Stewart Grand Prix
- Next name: Red Bull Racing

Formula One World Championship career
- First entry: 2000 Australian Grand Prix
- Races entered: 85
- Engines: Cosworth
- Constructors' Championships: 0 (best finish: 7th place 3 times, in 2002, 2003, and 2004)
- Drivers' Championships: 0 (best finish: 9th, Irvine, in 2002)
- Race victories: 0 (best finish: 3rd, 2001 Monaco Grand Prix and 2002 Italian Grand Prix)
- Podiums: 2
- Points: 49
- Pole positions: 0
- Fastest laps: 0
- Final entry: 2004 Brazilian Grand Prix

Jaguar as a Formula One engine manufacturer
Formula One World Championship career
- First entry: 1950 Italian Grand Prix
- Last entry: 1957 Indianapolis 500
- Races entered: 2 (1 start)
- Chassis: Ferrari, Mercedes
- Constructors' Championships: 0
- Drivers' Championships: 0
- Race victories: 0
- Podiums: 0
- Points: 0
- Pole positions: 0
- Fastest laps: 0

Jaguar Racing logo from 2000-2002

In June 1999, Jaguar's then-parent company, American automaker Ford, purchased Jackie Stewart's Stewart Grand Prix Formula One team for a price variously reported at £65 or £100 million. Ford was already a minority investor in the Stewart outfit and supplied the team with free of charge engines through its then-subsidiary Cosworth. It renamed the team to Jaguar in September 1999. Ford announced a $400 million project to build a unified facility in Silverstone for its engine and constructor operations, but these plans never came to fruition, and Jaguar remained in Milton Keynes.

The team operated for five seasons, from 2000 to 2004. During this period, The Times estimated that Ford spent £500 million on the team and incurred significant operating losses. Due to Jaguar's combination of works-team backing and limited success, it was deemed a major flop. Looking back in 2023, Motor Sport wrote that Jaguar was "one of the most high-profile failures in F1," with "a revolving door of management that made Jaguar Racing look like an employment bureau rather than a slick F1 team."

At the end of the 2004 season, Ford sold the team to Red Bull for £1. The Austrian company concurrently pledged to invest at least £200 million in the team over three years. Ford also sold Cosworth to the owners of Champ Car, thus effecting its complete operational withdrawal from F1 after 35 years as a competitor and/or engine supplier. Elements within the Ford organisation made a last-ditch attempt to save the team by rebranding it from Jaguar to Ford, but company leadership in Detroit went ahead with the sale; it was estimated that Ford was losing $50 million/year on F1. Formula One Group CEO Bernie Ecclestone regretted the loss but emphasized that Jaguar as a whole was in poor shape, explaining that with the parent company "closing a factory ... it would have been a bit cheeky to keep the Formula One factory going in those circumstances."

== Early involvements (1950, 1957) ==
At the 1950 Italian Grand Prix, privateer Clemente Biondetti entered the event with a self-built Jaguar-engined Ferrari chassis. This has been the first and only time that a Ferrari chassis entered a Grand Prix with a non-Ferrari engine.

In 1957, Danny Kladis entered the Indianapolis 500 with a Jaguar-engined Mercedes-Benz W154 chassis but failed to qualify.

== Constructor ==
=== 2000 season ===
For 2000, Jaguar retained Stewart driver Johnny Herbert and partnered him with 1999 world championship runner-up Eddie Irvine, who reportedly received a $15m contract. However, the team fell short of Stewart's 1999 results, finishing ninth in the Constructors' Championship, with Irvine scoring all four of the team's points. The only teams Jaguar beat were Minardi and Prost, which both failed to score any points. The highlight of the year was Irvine's fourth-place finish at Monaco.

Jaguar's rookie year introduced a common theme: the struggle for control between Ford headquarters in Detroit and Jaguar Racing's headquarters in Milton Keynes. The team was overseen by Wolfgang Reitzle, the head of Ford's Premier Automotive Group, whose remit included both Jaguar Racing and Ford's various luxury marques. Although Jackie Stewart initially stayed on as chairman and CEO, he stepped down in January 2000. Neil Ressler, Ford's chief technical officer, was appointed chairman and interim CEO in January, and became full-time CEO in May. Paul Stewart remained as COO but stepped down in the middle of the season due to colon cancer.

Ressler planned to fill the CEO role until Ford procured the services of Ferrari's Ross Brawn, a veteran of Jaguar's title-winning sports car operation, but this did not happen and Brawn stayed with Ferrari. In the meantime, he clashed with some of Jaguar's UK-based personnel. It was reported that during the Malaysian Grand Prix, Ressler nearly came to blows with technical director Gary Anderson, a holdover from Stewart GP who resented the Ford bureaucracy's intrusion on his turf. Anderson also complained that the England-based team was forced to use a wind tunnel in California (albeit the same wind tunnel that Stewart had previously used) and that Cosworth got more attention than Jaguar from Ford leadership in Detroit.

=== 2001 season ===
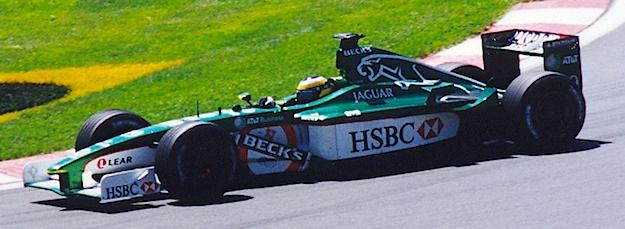
Pedro de la Rosa driving the Jaguar R2 at the 2001 Canadian Grand Prix.

For 2001, Jaguar retained Irvine and replaced Herbert with Luciano Burti, who was himself replaced by Pedro de la Rosa after four races. Irvine scored the team's first podium in Monaco, finishing third. This allowed Jaguar to finish eighth in the Constructors' Championship, with nine points, including four points-scoring performances.

The year was marked by continued management turmoil. In September 2000, Ressler appointed three-time CART champion Bobby Rahal as team principal for 2001. Ressler then stepped down as CEO before the season began. As part of a broader management shakeup, Ford created a "Ford Premier Performance Division" to oversee Jaguar and its other racing operations. Reitzle was named chairman and three-time Drivers' Champion Niki Lauda was named CEO, with a reported salary of $3 million/year. However, following financial turmoil at Jaguar, Ford redirected its efforts towards auto production and capped the racing team's budget at $150 million, of which $50 million went to the engine department.

Rahal recruited McLaren's former technical director Adrian Newey, but although Newey reportedly signed a contract with Jaguar, he refused to join the team, citing its fractured internal politics. Rahal also signed decorated chassis designer Steve Nichols. However, following Ressler's exit, Reitzle assumed overall control of the team and gave Lauda more authority. Following the Hungarian Grand Prix, Lauda ousted Rahal and appointed himself team principal.

=== 2002 season ===
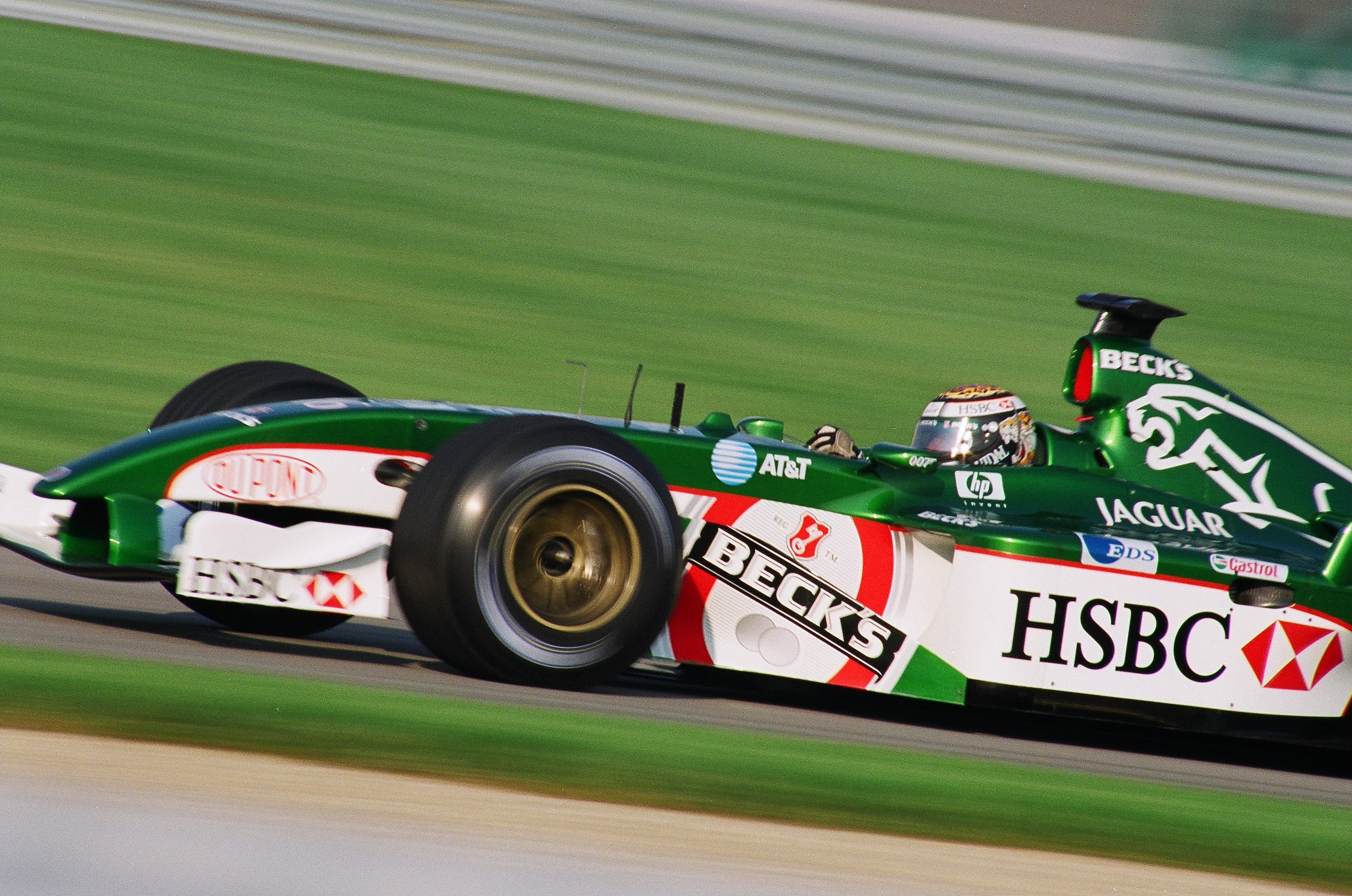
Eddie Irvine driving the R3 at the 2002 United States Grand Prix.

At the end of the 2001 season, Ford moved Guenther Steiner from its rally team to serve as Jaguar's managing director. John Allison took responsibility for the commercial and administrative aspects of the business. More broadly, the team's budget and performance came under closer scrutiny after Ford CEO Jacques Nasser retired and was replaced by William Clay Ford Jr. Although Nasser was enthusiastic about Formula One, Ford Jr. questioned why the company was spending so much money on a team that did not bear the Ford name.

Jaguar retained the Irvine-de la Rosa pairing for 2002 and were rewarded with another improvement in the Constructors' Championship, finishing seventh, scoring eight points, all from Irvine. Irvine recorded another podium at Monza, which would ultimately be Jaguar's last podium in Formula One. However, the team was held back by a disappointing car; at one point it was reported that Lauda was considering reusing the 2001 season's car. Lauda blamed the R3's poor aerodynamics on the lack of an on-site wind tunnel. Nichols left the team after the R3 performed badly in pre-season testing. Mark Gillan was appointed as technical director.

In mid-2002, Wolfgang Reitzle left Ford as part of a broader corporate reorganisation, declining an offer to take a reshaped role that did not include motorsports. At the end of the season, Ford stripped Lauda of the team principal role and laid off over 60 personnel. Although Lauda was asked to stay in an advisory role, he opted to leave the company, and Ford paid him to sit out the 2003 season.

=== 2003 season ===
To replace Lauda and Steiner, the team hired a new triumvirate of Ford overseer Tony Purnell (replacing Lauda at the Premier Performance Division), managing director David Pitchforth, and sporting and commercial director John Hogan. No team principal was appointed. Hogan complained that he was being "pulled all over the place because Ford in America wanted control," and left the team at the end of the season. He added that Ford continued to underinvest in the team, and questioned the wisdom of "run[ning] an F1 team on £150m a season." However, the team benefited from earlier investments in facility upgrades, including the long-awaited wind tunnel.

For 2003, Irvine and de la Rosa were replaced by Mark Webber and Antônio Pizzonia, a decision made by Lauda shortly before his ouster. In addition, Pizzonia was replaced in mid-season by Justin Wilson. The team jumped from eight to 18 points in the Constructors' Championship, but remained in seventh place. Webber scored seven times in seventeen races, and Wilson scored an additional point at Indianapolis.

=== 2004 season ===
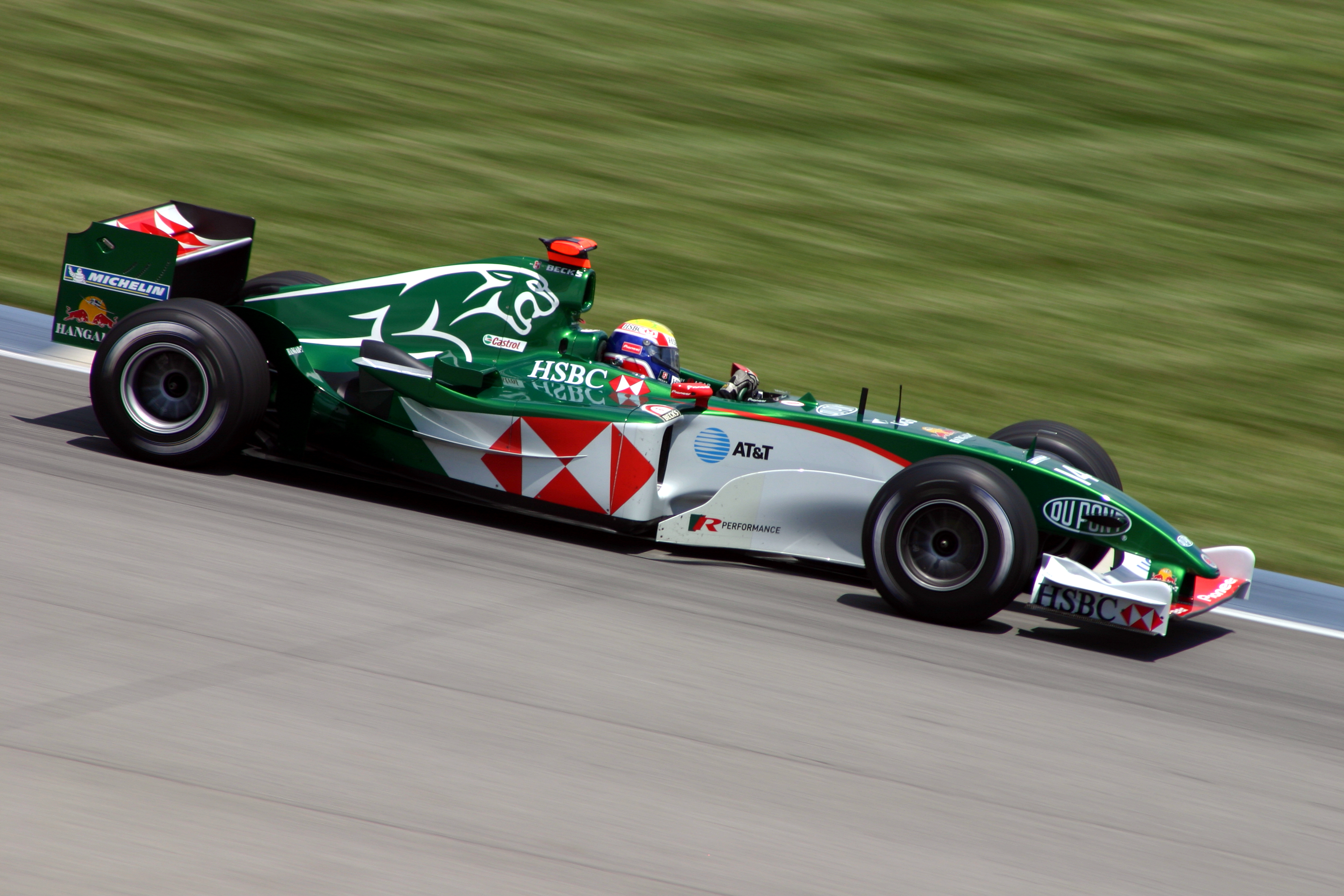
Mark Webber driving the R5 at the 2004 United States Grand Prix.

2004 marked Jaguar's final season in Formula One. The team retained Webber and replaced Wilson with Austrian driver Christian Klien, who reportedly brought in over £10m in sponsorship money from Thai-Austrian energy drink manufacturer Red Bull. Although the team took a step back on track, scoring only ten points in eighteen races, it nonetheless finished seventh in the Constructors' Championship for a third straight year. At the end of the year, Red Bull bought the team and renamed it Red Bull Racing.

The team earned an odd form of publicity when two of its engineers adopted an inflatable donkey (acquired following a give-away on a soda can) from the movie Shrek as an impromptu team mascot. After the 2004 Brazilian Grand Prix, Bernie Ecclestone, Max Mosley, much of the sport's management, and every driver except Michael Schumacher signed the donkey, which the engineers promised to auction off for charity.

In addition, the team set a $300,000 diamond into the nose cone of each car to promote the film Ocean's Twelve during the 2004 Monaco Grand Prix. However, Klien crashed on the first lap, and his car's diamond was never found.

== Complete Formula One results ==
=== As an engine supplier ===
(key) (results in bold indicate pole position; results in italics indicate fastest lap)

Year	Entrant	Chassis	Engine	Tyres	Drivers	1	2	3	4	5	6	7	8
1950	Clemente Biondetti	Ferrari 166S	XK 3.4 L6	**P**		GBR	MON	500	SUI	BEL	FRA	ITA	
1950	Clemente Biondetti	Ferrari 166S	XK 3.4 L6	**P**	(Italy) Clemente Biondetti							Ret	
1957	Safety Auto Glass	Mercedes W154	3.4 L6	**F**		ARG	MON	500	FRA	GBR	GER	PES	ITA
1957	Safety Auto Glass	Mercedes W154	3.4 L6	**F**	(United States) Danny Kladis			DNQ					

=== As a constructor ===
(key) (results in bold indicate pole position; results in italics indicate fastest lap)

Year	Entrant	Chassis	Engine	Tyres	Drivers	1	2	3	4	5	6	7	8	9	10	11	12	13	14	15	16	17	18	Points	WCC
2000	HSBC Jaguar Racing	R1	Cosworth CR-2 3.0 V10	B		AUS	BRA	SMR	GBR	ESP	EUR	MON	CAN	FRA	AUT	GER	HUN	BEL	ITA	USA	JPN	MAL		4	9th
2000	HSBC Jaguar Racing	R1	Cosworth CR-2 3.0 V10	B	(United Kingdom) Eddie Irvine	Ret	Ret	7	13	11	Ret	4	13	13	PO	10	8	10	Ret	7	8	6		4	9th
2000	HSBC Jaguar Racing	R1	Cosworth CR-2 3.0 V10	B	(Brazil) Luciano Burti										11									4	9th
2000	HSBC Jaguar Racing	R1	Cosworth CR-2 3.0 V10	B	(United Kingdom) Johnny Herbert	Ret	Ret	10	12	13	11^{†}	9	Ret	Ret	7	Ret	Ret	8	Ret	11	7	Ret		4	9th
2001	HSBC Jaguar Racing	R2	Cosworth CR-3 3.0 V10	M		AUS	MAL	BRA	SMR	ESP	AUT	MON	CAN	EUR	FRA	GBR	GER	HUN	BEL	ITA	USA	JPN		9	8th
2001	HSBC Jaguar Racing	R2	Cosworth CR-3 3.0 V10	M	(United Kingdom) Eddie Irvine	11	Ret	Ret	Ret	Ret	7	3	Ret	7	Ret	9	Ret	Ret	DNS	Ret	5	Ret		9	8th
2001	HSBC Jaguar Racing	R2	Cosworth CR-3 3.0 V10	M	(Brazil) Luciano Burti	8	10	Ret	11															9	8th
2001	HSBC Jaguar Racing	R2	Cosworth CR-3 3.0 V10	M	(Spain) Pedro de la Rosa					Ret	Ret	Ret	6	8	14	12	Ret	11	Ret	5	12	Ret		9	8th
2002	HSBC Jaguar Racing	R3; R3B	Cosworth CR-3 3.0 V10; Cosworth CR-4 3.0 V10	M		AUS	MAL	BRA	SMR	ESP	AUT	MON	CAN	EUR	GBR	FRA	GER	HUN	BEL	ITA	USA	JPN		8	7th
2002	HSBC Jaguar Racing	R3; R3B	Cosworth CR-3 3.0 V10; Cosworth CR-4 3.0 V10	M	(United Kingdom) Eddie Irvine	4	Ret	7	Ret	Ret	Ret	9	Ret	Ret	Ret	Ret	Ret	Ret	6	3	10	9		8	7th
2002	HSBC Jaguar Racing	R3; R3B	Cosworth CR-3 3.0 V10; Cosworth CR-4 3.0 V10	M	(Spain) Pedro de la Rosa	8	10	8	Ret	Ret	Ret	10	Ret	11	11	9	Ret	13	Ret	Ret	Ret	Ret		8	7th
2003	HSBC Jaguar Racing	R4	Cosworth CR-5 3.0 V10	M		AUS	MAL	BRA	SMR	ESP	AUT	MON	CAN	EUR	FRA	GBR	GER	HUN	ITA	USA	JPN			18	7th
2003	HSBC Jaguar Racing	R4	Cosworth CR-5 3.0 V10	M	(Australia) Mark Webber	Ret	Ret	9^{†}	Ret	7	7	Ret	7	6	6	14	11^{†}	6	7	Ret	11			18	7th
2003	HSBC Jaguar Racing	R4	Cosworth CR-5 3.0 V10	M	(Brazil) Antônio Pizzonia	13^{†}	Ret	Ret	14	Ret	9	Ret	10^{†}	10	10	Ret								18	7th
2003	HSBC Jaguar Racing	R4	Cosworth CR-5 3.0 V10	M	(United Kingdom) Justin Wilson												Ret	Ret	Ret	8	13			18	7th
2004	HSBC Jaguar Racing	R5; R5B	Cosworth CR-6 3.0 V10	M		AUS	MAL	BHR	SMR	ESP	MON	EUR	CAN	USA	FRA	GBR	GER	HUN	BEL	ITA	CHN	JPN	BRA	10	7th
2004	HSBC Jaguar Racing	R5; R5B	Cosworth CR-6 3.0 V10	M	(Australia) Mark Webber	Ret	Ret	8	13	12	Ret	7	Ret	Ret	9	8	6	10	Ret	9	10	Ret	Ret	10	7th
2004	HSBC Jaguar Racing	R5; R5B	Cosworth CR-6 3.0 V10	M	(Austria) Christian Klien	11	10	14	14	Ret	Ret	12	9	Ret	11	14	10	13	6	13	Ret	12	14	10	7th

Notes

- ^{†} – Driver did not finish the Grand Prix, but was classified as he completed over 90% of the race distance.

== Jaguar Junior Team ==
Jaguar competed in the 2001 British Formula Three Championship and the 2001 Masters of Formula 3 with test drivers James Courtney and André Lotterer.

=== Complete British Formula Three Championship results ===
(key) (Races in bold indicate pole position; races in italics indicate fastest lap)

Year	Entrant	Chassis	Engine	Drivers	1	2	3	4	5	6	7	8	9	10	11	12	13	14	15	16	17	18	19	20	21	22	23	24	25	26	27	DC	Points
2001	Jaguar Junior Team	Dallara F301	Mugen-Honda		SIL		SNE		DON		OUL		CRO		ROC		CAS		BRH		DON		KNO		THR			BRH		SIL			
2001	Jaguar Junior Team	Dallara F301	Mugen-Honda	(Australia) James Courtney	1	8	6	6	7	2	7	Ret	3	9	6	4	3	3	2	**2**	Ret	8	3	C	4	5	2	10	**2**	4	4	4th	227
2001	Jaguar Junior Team	Dallara F301	Mugen-Honda	(Germany) André Lotterer	Ret	9	7	9	**2**	**1**	Ret	16	6	7	5	3	6	6	3	7	2	4	Ret	C	8	13	7	DNS	6	**20**	8	7th	143

== See also ==
- Jaguar Cars
- Jaguar in motorsport
- Ford in Formula One
