= 2004 Australian Grand Prix =

First round of the 2004 Formula One season

Coordinates: 37°50′59″S 144°58′06″E

Race 1 of 18 in the 2004 Formula One World Championship
← Previous race	Next race →

Race details
- Date: 7 March 2004
- Official name: 2004 Foster's Australian Grand Prix
- Location: Albert Park Circuit, Albert Park, Melbourne, Victoria, Australia
- Course: Temporary street circuit
- Course length: 5.303 km (3.295 miles)
- Distance: 58 laps, 307.574 km (191.118 miles)
- Weather: Dry and cloudy Air temperature 20 °C (68 °F)
- Attendance: 121,500

Pole position
Driver	(Germany) Michael Schumacher	Ferrari
- Time: 1:24.408

Fastest lap
Driver	(Germany) Michael Schumacher	Ferrari
- Time: 1:24.125 on lap 29 (lap record)

Podium
First	(Germany) Michael Schumacher	Ferrari
Second	(Brazil) Rubens Barrichello	Ferrari
Third	(Spain) Fernando Alonso	Renault

The 2004 Australian Grand Prix (officially the 2004 Foster's Australian Grand Prix) was a Formula One motor race held on 7 March 2004 at the Albert Park Circuit. It was Race 1 of 18 in the 2004 FIA Formula One World Championship. Michael Schumacher won the race for Ferrari from pole position in dominant fashion, (Note: Michael Schumacher had his fourth career grand slam and his second for Ferrari, having taken pole position, the fastest lap, and won the race by leading every lap.) with his teammate Rubens Barrichello finishing behind him in second. This 1–2 finish gave Ferrari a strong 9-point lead in the constructors' standings after just one race. Williams and Renault each had both cars finish in the points while McLaren, a team that had enjoyed success in years preceding this, only managed one point, with David Coulthard finishing a lapped 8th. The 1-2 finish for Schumacher and Barrichello was the first one-two finish for their Ferrari team since the 2002 Japanese Grand Prix.

This race marked the first time since the 2001 San Marino Grand Prix that cars competed without using fully-automatic gearboxes and launch control, which were both banned by the FIA after the 2003 season. The use of traction control was still permitted by the FIA, and would continue to be used over the next three seasons, until being banned for the 2008 season.

This race also marked the 150th Grand Prix race for the McLaren and Mercedes engine partnership since 1995 and the F1 debut of Jaguar driver Christian Klien.

== Report ==
=== Background ===
The 2004 Australian Grand Prix took place at the 5.303 km (3.295 mi) Albert Park Circuit in Albert Park, Melbourne, Victoria on 7 March 2004; it was the first round of eighteen in the 2004 Formula One World Championship and the ninth staging of the World Championship Australian Grand Prix at Albert Park. The Porsche Michelin Carrera Cup, the Cleanevent Nations Cup, the Formula Ford Track Attack, the Cleanevent Historic Touring Cars, the REV GT Kart Challenge and V8 Supercars held support races during the weekend.

The event included ten constructors, each with two race drivers. Anthony Davidson (British American Racing; BAR), Björn Wirdheim (Jaguar), Ricardo Zonta (Toyota), Timo Glock (Jordan) were the four drivers who drove a third car in only the Friday practice sessions. Bas Leinders was entered as Minardi's third driver but was denied an FIA Super Licence by the FIA for his lack of running in a Formula One car. Ferrari brought their new F2004 car to the race, unlike what the marque had done in the previous two years. Renault focused on reducing the size of the asymmetrically-mounted radiating masses on its R24 car.

=== Friday drivers ===
The bottom six teams in the 2003 Constructors' Championship were entitled to run a third car in free practice on Friday. These drivers drove on Friday but did not compete in qualifying or the race.

Constructor	Nat	Driver
BAR-Honda	(United Kingdom)	Anthony Davidson
Sauber-Petronas		-
Jaguar-Cosworth	(Sweden)	Björn Wirdheim
Toyota	(Brazil)	Ricardo Zonta
Jordan-Ford	(Germany)	Timo Glock
Minardi-Cosworth	(Belgium)	Bas Leinders

=== Qualifying ===
Qualifying resulted in a Ferrari one-two, with Juan Pablo Montoya third on the grid for Williams. Gianmaria Bruni, Christian Klien and Olivier Panis all failed to set a qualifying time.

=== Race ===
At the start, Alonso was up and away and ahead of Button and looking for a way to deal with Montoya while Jarno Trulli went from ninth on the grid to be fifth out of the first corner. He was aided in his task by Montoya, who went howling down to Turn 1, braked just a hint too late and Montoya was jumped by the Renault of Fernando Alonso as he tried to stay ahead of the surging Alonso. He went off and Alonso had to put some wheels on the grass to avoid a disaster. Montoya went back to seventh. That condemned the Colombian to an afternoon stuck in traffic and put paid to any challenge there might have been for Alonso. Behind all this there were a few wheels off the grass as others sorted themselves out (notably both Saubers) while Takuma Sato bumped the rear end of Trulli's Renault, slightly (but significantly) damaging both cars.

The Ferraris were gone already and as the afternoon developed all that Fernando Alonso could do was to watch the rears of the two red cars as they disappeared from his view. It did not take long. By the fourth lap they were two seconds ahead. By the eighth lap they were five seconds clear and after that Alonso had nothing to do. No one else could keep up with him. Sauber's Giancarlo Fisichella had a long battle for position in the midfield with Jordan's Nick Heidfeld. Fisichella passed Heidfeld, who later dropped out of the race with a transmission failure. Heidfeld was involved in an incident in the pit lane where the mechanic Matt Deane and refueller Mick Gomme were hit by the car and suffered some bruising. Montoya attempted to regain the place by going around the outside of the Spaniard into the first turn, but outbraked himself and ran wide. This dropped him behind his teammate Ralf Schumacher, who'd qualified 8th. Despite repassing Ralf Schumacher on-track, the Colombian ended up behind him again by the race's end in fifth place. The race proved that Ferrari once again had a dominant car, with Michael Schumacher winning from teammate Rubens Barrichello in Ferrari's first one-two since Japan 2002, while the rest of the field was over 20 seconds behind. Schumacher led every one of the 58 race laps. At the start, Montoya was jumped by the Renault of Fernando Alonso.

Fernando Alonso gave Renault a podium with third place, while Jenson Button got BAR off the mark with sixth. Jarno Trulli finished 7th in the Renault and was the first lapped runner. McLaren seemed to be less competitive than in recent years, with Kimi Räikkönen becoming the first retirement of the year, dropping out with an engine problem, and with David Coulthard picking up just 1 point in eighth place.

== Classification ==
=== Qualifying ===
Pos	No	Driver	Constructor	Q1 Time	Q2 Time	Gap	Grid
1	1	(Germany) Michael Schumacher	Ferrari	1:25.301	1:24.408	—	1
2	2	(Brazil) Rubens Barrichello	Ferrari	1:25.992	1:24.482	+0.074	2
3	3	(Colombia) Juan Pablo Montoya	Williams-BMW	1:25.226	1:24.998	+0.590	3
4	9	(United Kingdom) Jenson Button	BAR-Honda	1:25.898	1:24.998	+0.590	4
5	8	(Spain) Fernando Alonso	Renault	1:25.928	1:25.669	+1.261	5
6	14	(Australia) Mark Webber	Jaguar-Cosworth	1:26.232	1:25.805	+1.397	6
7	10	(Japan) Takuma Sato	BAR-Honda	1:26.737	1:25.851	+1.443	7
8	4	(Germany) Ralf Schumacher	Williams-BMW	1:25.445	1:25.925	+1.517	8
9	7	(Italy) Jarno Trulli	Renault	1:27.357	1:26.290	+1.882	9
10	6	(Finland) Kimi Räikkönen	McLaren-Mercedes	1:25.592	1:26.297	+1.889	10
11	12	(Brazil) Felipe Massa	Sauber-Petronas	1:26.833	1:27.065	+2.657	11
12	5	(United Kingdom) David Coulthard	McLaren-Mercedes	1:25.652	1:27.294	+2.886	12
13	16	(Brazil) Cristiano da Matta	Toyota	1:28.274	1:27.823	+3.415	13
14	11	(Italy) Giancarlo Fisichella	Sauber-Petronas	1:26.286	1:27.845	+3.437	14
15	18	(Germany) Nick Heidfeld	Jordan-Ford	1:27.469	1:28.178	+3.770	15
16	19	(Italy) Giorgio Pantano	Jordan-Ford	1:29.156	1:30.140	+5.732	16
17	21	(Hungary) Zsolt Baumgartner	Minardi-Cosworth	1:32.606	1:30.681	+6.273	17
18	17	(France) Olivier Panis	Toyota	1:27.253	No time^{1}		18
19	15	(Austria) Christian Klien	Jaguar-Cosworth	1:27.258	No time^{2}		19
20	20	(Italy) Gianmaria Bruni	Minardi-Cosworth	1:30.912	No time^{2}		20

Notes

- ^1 – Olivier Panis did not get time in Q2 due to electronics problems.
- ^2 – Christian Klien and Gianmaria Bruni did not get time in Q2 due to hydraulics problems.

=== Race ===
Pos	No	Driver	Constructor	Tyre	Laps	Time/Retired	Grid	Points
1	1	(Germany) Michael Schumacher	Ferrari	B	58	1:24:15.757	1	10
2	2	(Brazil) Rubens Barrichello	Ferrari	B	58	+13.605	2	8
3	8	(Spain) Fernando Alonso	Renault	M	58	+34.673	5	6
4	4	(Germany) Ralf Schumacher	Williams-BMW	M	58	+1:00.423	8	5
5	3	(Colombia) Juan Pablo Montoya	Williams-BMW	M	58	+1:08.536	3	4
6	9	(United Kingdom) Jenson Button	BAR-Honda	M	58	+1:10.598	4	3
7	7	(Italy) Jarno Trulli	Renault	M	57	+1 Lap	9	2
8	5	(United Kingdom) David Coulthard	McLaren-Mercedes	M	57	+1 Lap	12	1
9	10	(Japan) Takuma Sato	BAR-Honda	M	57	+1 Lap	7	
10	11	(Italy) Giancarlo Fisichella	Sauber-Petronas	B	57	+1 Lap	14	
11	15	(Austria) Christian Klien	Jaguar-Cosworth	M	56	+2 Laps	19	
12	16	(Brazil) Cristiano da Matta	Toyota	M	56	+2 Laps	13	
13	17	(France) Olivier Panis	Toyota	M	56	+2 Laps	18	
14	19	(Italy) Giorgio Pantano	Jordan-Ford	B	55	+3 Laps	16	
Ret	12	(Brazil) Felipe Massa	Sauber-Petronas	B	44	Engine	11	
Ret	18	(Germany) Nick Heidfeld	Jordan-Ford	B	43	Transmission	15	
NC	20	(Italy) Gianmaria Bruni	Minardi-Cosworth	B	43	+15 Laps	20	
Ret	14	(Australia) Mark Webber	Jaguar-Cosworth	M	29	Transmission	6	
Ret	21	(Hungary) Zsolt Baumgartner	Minardi-Cosworth	B	13	Electrical	17	
Ret	6	(Finland) Kimi Räikkönen	McLaren-Mercedes	M	9	Engine/Spin	10	

== Championship standings after the race ==
Drivers' Championship standings

Pos	Driver	Points
1	(Germany) Michael Schumacher	10
2	(Brazil) Rubens Barrichello	8
3	(Spain) Fernando Alonso	6
4	(Germany) Ralf Schumacher	5
5	(Colombia) Juan Pablo Montoya	4

Constructors' Championship standings

Pos	Constructor	Points
1	(Italy) Ferrari	18
2	(United Kingdom) Williams-BMW	9
3	(France) Renault	8
4	(United Kingdom) BAR-Honda	3
5	(United Kingdom) McLaren-Mercedes	1

- Note: Only the top five positions are included for both sets of standings.

== Footnotes ==
Previous race: 2003 Japanese Grand Prix	FIA Formula One World Championship; 2004 season	Next race: 2004 Malaysian Grand Prix
Previous race: 2003 Australian Grand Prix	Australian Grand Prix	Next race: 2005 Australian Grand Prix
