= 2003 Japanese Grand Prix =

Coordinates: 34°50′35″N 136°32′26″E

Race 16 of 16 in the 2003 Formula One World Championship
← Previous race	Next race →
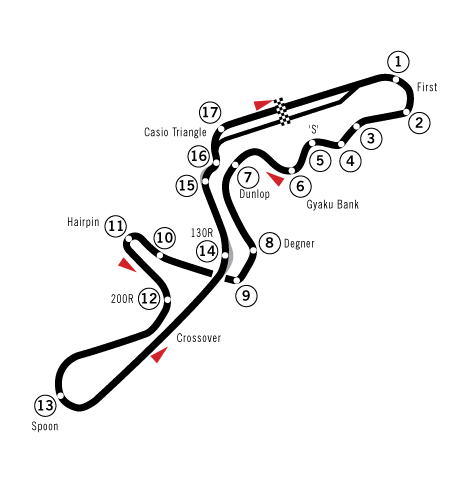

Race details
- Date: 12 October 2003
- Official name: 2003 Fuji Television Japanese Grand Prix
- Location: Suzuka Circuit, Suzuka, Mie, Japan
- Course: Permanent racing facility
- Course length: 5.807 km (3.608 miles)
- Distance: 53 laps, 307.573 km (191.117 miles)
- Weather: Cloudy, Air: 22 °C (72 °F), Track 25 °C (77 °F)
- Attendance: 329,000

Pole position
Driver	(Brazil) Rubens Barrichello	Ferrari
- Time: 1:31.713

Fastest lap
Driver	(Germany) Ralf Schumacher	Williams-BMW
- Time: 1:33.408

Podium
First	(Brazil) Rubens Barrichello	Ferrari
Second	(Finland) Kimi Räikkönen	McLaren-Mercedes
Third	(United Kingdom) David Coulthard	McLaren-Mercedes

The 2003 Japanese Grand Prix (officially known as the 2003 Fuji Television Japanese Grand Prix) was a Formula One motor race that took place on 12 October 2003 at the Suzuka Circuit in Suzuka, Mie, Japan. It was the sixteenth and final round of the 2003 Formula One World Championship. Rubens Barrichello took pole position for the race in the Ferrari and went on to take the race win, ahead of the McLarens of Kimi Räikkönen and David Coulthard.

Michael Schumacher finished in eighth place, enough to secure his record-breaking sixth World Drivers' Championship, surpassing the record set by Juan Manuel Fangio in 1957. This was also Schumacher's fourth consecutive title, matching the record set by Fangio in 1957. Barrichello's win saw Ferrari clinch their thirteenth Constructors' Championship, the team's fifth title in a row.

This event also notably marked the last race for cars using launch control and fully-automatic gearboxes, since their reintroduction at the 2001 Spanish Grand Prix. The FIA banned these two electronic driver aid systems ahead of the 2004 season. This was also the final Grand Prix for 3-time race winner Heinz-Harald Frentzen and 2-time podium finisher Jos Verstappen. As of 2025, this is the last occasion where the Japanese Grand Prix in general and the Suzuka Circuit hosted the final race of a Formula One World Championship season.

== Background ==
The event was held at the Suzuka International Racing Course in Suzuka, Mie for the 17th time in the circuit's history, across the weekend of 10–12 October. The Grand Prix was the sixteenth and final round of the 2003 Formula One World Championship and the 19th running of the Japanese Grand Prix as part of the Formula One World Championship.

=== Championship standings before the race ===
Heading into the final race of the season, Ferrari driver Michael Schumacher was leading the Drivers' Championship with 92 points, 9 points ahead of McLaren driver Kimi Räikkönen and 10 ahead of Juan Pablo Montoya. A maximum of 10 points were available, which meant that Räikkönen could still win the title. Schumacher only needed an eighth-place finish to secure the championship, seeing as he held the tiebreaker on wins over Räikkönen, 6 to 1. Räikkönen needed to win and for Schumacher not to score a single point, in order for him to become champion. Montoya could still finish equal on points with Schumacher, but was out of contention for the title due to the tiebreaker on wins (6 to 2).

=== Driver changes ===
Jacques Villeneuve pulled out of the Grand Prix after asking to be released by the BAR team. He was replaced by the team's test driver Takuma Sato. Sato had already been confirmed as their driver for the 2004 season in the days running up to the race, along with Jenson Button staying at the team.

== Practice ==
Three free practice sessions were held for the event. Renault driver Jarno Trulli set the fastest time in the first session, ahead of Michael Schumacher and David Coulthard, in second and third places respectively. The second session was topped by Ralf Schumacher in the BMW Williams, ahead of his brother Michael and Rubens Barrichello. Ralf also led the third practice session, this time ahead of Juan Pablo Montoya and then Michael.

=== Friday drivers ===
Three teams in the 2003 Constructors' Championship had the right to run a third car on Friday's additional testing. These drivers did not compete in qualifying or the race.

Constructor	Nat	Driver
Renault	(United Kingdom)	Allan McNish
Jordan-Ford	(Japan)	Satoshi Motoyama
Minardi-Cosworth	(Italy)	Gianmaria Bruni

== Qualifying ==
Qualifying consisted of two one-hour sessions, one on Friday and one on Saturday afternoon. The first session's running order was determined by the Drivers' Championship standings, with the leading driver going first. Each driver was allowed to set one lap time. The result determined the running order in the second session: the fastest driver in the first session was allowed to go last in the second session, which usually provided the benefit of a cleaner track. Drivers were again allowed to set one lap time, which determined the order on the grid for the race on Sunday, with the fastest driver scoring pole position.

=== Qualifying report ===
Rain fell at the end of second qualifying, giving the advantage to the drivers that went out earlier, like the Toyotas, who finished third and fourth, and Mark Webber taking sixth position on the grid. Jarno Trulli and Ralf Schumacher, the fastest drivers on Friday, did not finish their timed lap, as the rain was too heavy, and were assigned 19th and 20th position on the grid, respectively.

=== Qualifying classification ===
Pos	No	Driver	Constructor	Q1 Time	Q2 Time	Gap	Grid
1	2	(Brazil) Rubens Barrichello	Ferrari	1:30.758	1:31.713		1
2	3	(Colombia) Juan Pablo Montoya	Williams-BMW	1:31.201	1:32.412	+0.699	2
3	21	(Brazil) Cristiano da Matta	Toyota	1:32.256	1:32.419	+0.706	3
4	20	(France) Olivier Panis	Toyota	1:31.908	1:32.862	+1.149	4
5	8	(Spain) Fernando Alonso	Renault	1:30.624	1:33.044	+1.331	5
6	14	(Australia) Mark Webber	Jaguar-Cosworth	1:31.305	1:33.106	+1.393	6
7	5	(United Kingdom) David Coulthard	McLaren-Mercedes	1:30.482	1:33.137	+1.424	7
8	6	(Finland) Kimi Räikkönen	McLaren-Mercedes	1:30.558	1:33.272	+1.559	8
9	17	(United Kingdom) Jenson Button	BAR-Honda	1:32.374	1:33.474	+1.761	9
10	15	(United Kingdom) Justin Wilson	Jaguar-Cosworth	1:32.291	1:33.558	+1.845	10
11	9	(Germany) Nick Heidfeld	Sauber-Petronas	1:31.783	1:33.632	+1.919	11
12	10	(Germany) Heinz-Harald Frentzen	Sauber-Petronas	1:31.892	1:33.896	+2.183	12
13	16	(Japan) Takuma Sato	BAR-Honda	1:31.832	1:33.924	+2.211	13
14	1	(Germany) Michael Schumacher	Ferrari	1:30.464	1:34.302	+2.589	14
15	12	(Republic of Ireland) Ralph Firman	Jordan-Ford	1:33.057	1:34.771	+3.058	15
16	11	(Italy) Giancarlo Fisichella	Jordan-Ford	1:33.313	1:34.912	+3.199	16
17	19	(Netherlands) Jos Verstappen	Minardi-Cosworth	1:34.836	1:34.975	+3.262	17
18	18	(Denmark) Nicolas Kiesa	Minardi-Cosworth	1:36.181	1:37.226	+5.513	18
19	4	(Germany) Ralf Schumacher	Williams-BMW	1:30.343	No time^{1}		19
20	7	(Italy) Jarno Trulli	Renault	1:30.281	No time^{2}		20

Notes

- ^1 – Ralf Schumacher did not set a time in Q2 because he spun in the final corner and did not complete his flying lap.
- ^2 – Jarno Trulli did not set a time in Q2 because Renault decided to save fuel when the track was wet and he did not even complete his flying lap.

== Race ==
The race was held on 12 October 2003 and was run for 53 laps.

=== Race report ===
With parts of the race track still damp from overnight rain, Rubens Barrichello took advantage of his start on the dry line and easily held off second-starting Juan Pablo Montoya. However, he had trouble getting his tyres up to temperature and he was passed by Montoya in Spoon corner. Fernando Alonso had passed both Toyotas to get up to third position and was now right behind Barrichello. Ralf Schumacher had climbed up to fourteenth position but spun his Williams at the final chicane and rejoined in second-to-last place. Michael Schumacher and Jarno Trulli were running twelfth and thirteenth, respectively, by the end of the first lap.

On lap seven, the championship leader tried to dive down the inside of Takuma Sato, but the BAR driver close the door, clipped Schumacher's front wing and forcing the Ferrari driver to make a pit stop. His teammate had more luck when Montoya suffered a hydraulics issue and limped back to the pits, where he retired the car. Alonso's engine gave up on lap 18, which left Barrichello under pressure from both McLarens. The Brazilian played a key role in the Drivers' Championship, as Kimi Räikkönen needed to win the race to have a shot at clinching the title.

The Schumacher brothers were fighting with Cristiano da Matta over eighth place when the trio arrived at the final chicane and Michael locked his wheels. This caught out Ralf, who hit the back of the Ferrari and spun off. Michael continued without damage but stayed away from Da Matta, effectively settling for the necessary eighth place. Barrichello won the race, 11 seconds ahead of the Räikkönen, earning the Constructors' Championship for his Ferrari team and giving the Drivers' Championship to his teammate Michael Schumacher.

=== Race classification ===
Pos	No	Driver	Constructor	Tyre	Laps	Time/Retired	Grid	Points
1	2	(Brazil) Rubens Barrichello	Ferrari	B	53	1:25:11.743	1	10
2	6	(Finland) Kimi Räikkönen	McLaren-Mercedes	M	53	+11.085	8	8
3	5	(United Kingdom) David Coulthard	McLaren-Mercedes	M	53	+11.614	7	6
4	17	(United Kingdom) Jenson Button	BAR-Honda	B	53	+33.106	9	5
5	7	(Italy) Jarno Trulli	Renault	M	53	+34.269	20	4
6	16	(Japan) Takuma Sato	BAR-Honda	B	53	+51.692	13	3
7	21	(Brazil) Cristiano da Matta	Toyota	M	53	+56.794	3	2
8	1	(Germany) Michael Schumacher	Ferrari	B	53	+59.487	14	1
9	9	(Germany) Nick Heidfeld	Sauber-Petronas	B	53	+1:00.159	11	
10	20	(France) Olivier Panis	Toyota	M	53	+1:01.844	4	
11	14	(Australia) Mark Webber	Jaguar-Cosworth	M	53	+1:11.005	6	
12	4	(Germany) Ralf Schumacher	Williams-BMW	M	52	+1 Lap	19	
13	15	(United Kingdom) Justin Wilson	Jaguar-Cosworth	M	52	+1 Lap	10	
14	12	(Republic of Ireland) Ralph Firman	Jordan-Ford	B	51	+2 Laps	15	
15	19	(Netherlands) Jos Verstappen	Minardi-Cosworth	B	51	+2 Laps	17	
16	18	(Denmark) Nicolas Kiesa	Minardi-Cosworth	B	50	+3 Laps	18	
Ret	11	(Italy) Giancarlo Fisichella	Jordan-Ford	B	33	Out of fuel	16	
Ret	8	(Spain) Fernando Alonso	Renault	M	17	Engine	5	
Ret	10	(Germany) Heinz-Harald Frentzen	Sauber-Petronas	B	9	Engine	12	
Ret	3	(Colombia) Juan Pablo Montoya	Williams-BMW	M	9	Hydraulics	2	

== Final Championship standings ==
- Bold text and an asterisk indicates the World Champions.

Drivers' Championship standings

+/–	Pos	Driver	Points
	1	(Germany) Michael Schumacher*	93
	2	(Finland) Kimi Räikkönen	91
	3	(Colombia) Juan Pablo Montoya	82
1	4	(Brazil) Rubens Barrichello	65
1	5	(Germany) Ralf Schumacher	58

Constructors' Championship standings

+/–	Pos	Constructor	Points
	1	(Italy) Ferrari*	158
	2	(United Kingdom) Williams-BMW	144
	3	(United Kingdom) McLaren-Mercedes	142
	4	(France) Renault	88
1	5	(United Kingdom) BAR-Honda	26

- Note: Only the top five positions are included for both sets of standings.

Previous race: 2003 United States Grand Prix	FIA Formula One World Championship; 2003 season	Next race: 2004 Australian Grand Prix
Previous race: 2002 Japanese Grand Prix	Japanese Grand Prix	Next race: 2004 Japanese Grand Prix
