= 2004 French Grand Prix =

Coordinates: 46°51′51″N 3°09′49″E

Race 10 of 18 in the 2004 Formula One World Championship
← Previous race	Next race →

Race details
- Date: 4 July 2004
- Official name: Formula 1 Mobil 1 Grand Prix de France 2004
- Location: Magny-Cours, France
- Course: Permanent racing facility
- Course length: 4.411 km (2.741 miles)
- Distance: 70 laps, 308.586 km (191.746 miles)
- Weather: Sunny, 28°C

Pole position
Driver	(Spain) Fernando Alonso	Renault
- Time: 1:13.698

Fastest lap
Driver	(Germany) Michael Schumacher	Ferrari
- Time: 1:15.377 on lap 32 (lap record)

Podium
First	(Germany) Michael Schumacher	Ferrari
Second	(Spain) Fernando Alonso	Renault
Third	(Brazil) Rubens Barrichello	Ferrari

The 2004 French Grand Prix (officially known as the Formula 1 Mobil 1 Grand Prix de France 2004) was a Formula One motor race that took place on 4 July 2004 at the Circuit de Nevers Magny-Cours in Nevers, France. It was the tenth round of the 2004 FIA Formula One World Championship.

Famously, championship leader Michael Schumacher employed a four-stop strategy to beat Renault's Fernando Alonso and Ferrari teammate Rubens Barrichello.

== Background ==
The event was held at the Circuit de Nevers Magny-Cours in Nevers for the fourteenth time in the circuit's history across the weekend of 2–4 July. The Grand Prix was the tenth round of the 2004 Formula One World Championship and the 54th running of the French Grand Prix as a round of the Formula One World Championship.

=== Championship standings before the race ===
Going into the weekend, Michael Schumacher led the Drivers' Championship with 80 points, 16 points ahead of his teammate Rubens Barrichello in second, and 36 ahead of BAR's Jenson Button in third. Ferrari, with 142 points, led the Constructors' Championship from Renault with 66 and BAR-Honda with 58 points.

=== Driver changes ===
Williams reserve driver Marc Gené replaced Ralf Schumacher, following the German's back injury at the previous round. He would also drive in the next Grand Prix.

== Practice ==
Four free practice sessions were held for the event. On Friday it rained, but the first session was unsurprisingly topped by the Ferraris of Rubens Barrichello and Michael Schumacher. The second session, however, saw Toyota's Cristiano da Matta on top, six tenths ahead of Jarno Trulli in the Renault, with Schumacher down in fifth.

On Saturday, the sky was clear and Michael Schumacher topped the third session, ahead of David Coulthard in the McLaren. The German dropped down to third place in the fourth and final session, behind Coulthard's teammate Kimi Räikkönen and BAR's Jenson Button.

=== Friday drivers ===
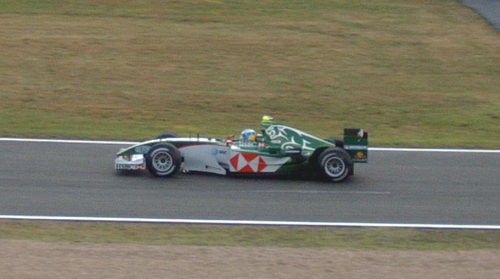
Björn Wirdheim driving for Jaguar

The bottom 6 teams in the 2003 Constructors' Championship were entitled to run a third car in free practice on Friday. These drivers drove on Friday but did not compete in qualifying or the race.

Constructor	Nat	Driver
BAR-Honda	(United Kingdom)	Anthony Davidson
Sauber-Petronas	N/A	N/A
Jaguar-Cosworth	(Sweden)	Björn Wirdheim
Toyota	(Brazil)	Ricardo Zonta
Jordan-Ford	(Germany)	Timo Glock
Minardi-Cosworth	(Belgium)	Bas Leinders

== Qualifying ==
Qualifying on Saturday consisted of two sessions. In the first session, drivers went out one by one in the order in which they classified at the previous race. Each driver was allowed to set one lap time. The result determined the running order in the second session: the fastest driver in the first session was allowed to go last in the second session, which usually provided the benefit of a cleaner track. In the second session, drivers were again allowed to set one lap time, which determined the order on the grid for the race on Sunday, with the fastest driver scoring pole position.

Pos	No	Driver	Constructor	Q1 Time	Q2 Time	Gap	Grid
1	8	(Spain) Fernando Alonso	Renault	1:13.750	1:13.698	—	1
2	1	(Germany) Michael Schumacher	Ferrari	1:13.541	1:13.971	+0.273	2
3	5	(United Kingdom) David Coulthard	McLaren-Mercedes	1:13.649	1:13.987	+0.289	3
4	9	(United Kingdom) Jenson Button	BAR-Honda	1:13.772	1:13.995	+0.297	4
5	7	(Italy) Jarno Trulli	Renault	1:13.949	1:14.070	+0.372	5
6	3	(Colombia) Juan Pablo Montoya	Williams-BMW	1:13.377	1:14.172	+0.474	6
7	10	(Japan) Takuma Sato	BAR-Honda	1:14.130	1:14.240	+0.542	7
8	4	(Spain) Marc Gené	Williams-BMW	1:14.133	1:14.275	+0.577	8
9	6	(Finland) Kimi Räikkönen	McLaren-Mercedes	1:13.736	1:14.346	+0.648	9
10	2	(Brazil) Rubens Barrichello	Ferrari	No time^{1}	1:14.478	+0.780	10
11	16	(Brazil) Cristiano da Matta	Toyota	1:14.245	1:14.553	+0.855	11
12	14	(Australia) Mark Webber	Jaguar-Cosworth	1:15.332	1:14.798	+1.100	12
13	15	(Austria) Christian Klien	Jaguar-Cosworth	1:15.205	1:15.065	+1.367	13
14	17	(France) Olivier Panis	Toyota	1:14.540	1:15.130	+1.432	14
15	11	(Italy) Giancarlo Fisichella	Sauber-Petronas	1:15.793	1:16.177	+2.479	15
16	12	(Brazil) Felipe Massa	Sauber-Petronas	1:14.627	1:16.200	+2.502	16
17	18	(Germany) Nick Heidfeld	Jordan-Ford	1:16.366	1:16.807	+3.109	17
18	19	(Italy) Giorgio Pantano	Jordan-Ford	1:15.913	1:17.462	+3.764	18
19	20	(Italy) Gianmaria Bruni	Minardi-Cosworth	1:18.070	1:17.913	+4.215	19
20	21	(Hungary) Zsolt Baumgartner	Minardi-Cosworth	1:18.108	1:18.247	+4.549	20

Notes

- ^1 – Rubens Barrichello was left without a time in Q1 due to a hydraulic problem.

== Race ==
=== Race report ===
Fernando Alonso and Michael Schumacher kept their positions at the start, while Jarno Trulli took advantage of a slow-starting David Coulthard and managed to pass Jenson Button to take third position. Schumacher kept with Alonso as they traded fastest laps, until the German pitted on the end of lap 11. The leading Renault managed to continue three more laps and, after his stop, had grown his lead to three seconds.

Schumacher stopped for a second time on lap 28 and then set a series of fastest laps, which led to Alonso falling behind him after his stop four laps later. Another stop by the Ferrari on lap 42 was a sign of low fuel levels, which explained his superior pace. After Alonso made his third and final stop on lap 45, he rejoined in second place but never managed to match Schumacher's lap times. The gap had opened up to over 20 seconds by lap 57, when the World Champion pitted for a fourth time and returned to the track, still seven seconds ahead of his nearest rival. Schumacher scored his ninth win of the season.

Behind the leading duo, David Coulthard had started third but trouble with the fuel hose on his second stop, dropped him down to eighth, which became sixth at the finish. Jenson Button had started fourth but nearly stalled his engine at the third stop. This left Rubens Barrichello and Jarno Trulli fighting over third place, with the Brazilian getting the upper hand with an audacious overtaking manoeuvre just two corners from the finish line.

=== Race classification ===
Pos	No	Driver	Constructor	Tyre	Laps	Time/Retired	Grid	Points
1	1	(Germany) Michael Schumacher	Ferrari	B	70	1:30:18.133	2	10
2	8	(Spain) Fernando Alonso	Renault	M	70	+8.329	1	8
3	2	(Brazil) Rubens Barrichello	Ferrari	B	70	+31.622	10	6
4	7	(Italy) Jarno Trulli	Renault	M	70	+32.082	5	5
5	9	(United Kingdom) Jenson Button	BAR-Honda	M	70	+32.482	4	4
6	5	(United Kingdom) David Coulthard	McLaren-Mercedes	M	70	+35.520	3	3
7	6	(Finland) Kimi Räikkönen	McLaren-Mercedes	M	70	+36.230	9	2
8	3	(Colombia) Juan Pablo Montoya	Williams-BMW	M	70	+43.419	6	1
9	14	(Australia) Mark Webber	Jaguar-Cosworth	M	70	+52.394	12	
10	4	(Spain) Marc Gené	Williams-BMW	M	70	+58.166	8	
11	15	(Austria) Christian Klien	Jaguar-Cosworth	M	69	+1 lap	13	
12	11	(Italy) Giancarlo Fisichella	Sauber-Petronas	B	69	+1 lap	15	
13	12	(Brazil) Felipe Massa	Sauber-Petronas	B	69	+1 lap	16	
14	16	(Brazil) Cristiano da Matta	Toyota	M	69	+1 lap	11	
15	17	(France) Olivier Panis	Toyota	M	68	+2 laps	14	
16	18	(Germany) Nick Heidfeld	Jordan-Ford	B	68	+2 laps	17	
17	19	(Italy) Giorgio Pantano	Jordan-Ford	B	67	+3 laps	18	
18	20	(Italy) Gianmaria Bruni	Minardi-Cosworth	B	65	Gearbox	19	
Ret	21	(Hungary) Zsolt Baumgartner	Minardi-Cosworth	B	31	Spin	20	
Ret	10	(Japan) Takuma Sato	BAR-Honda	M	15	Engine	7	

== Championship standings after the race ==
Drivers' Championship standings

Pos	Driver	Points
1	(Germany) Michael Schumacher	90
2	(Brazil) Rubens Barrichello	68
3	(United Kingdom) Jenson Button	48
4	(Italy) Jarno Trulli	46
5	(Spain) Fernando Alonso	33

Constructors' Championship standings

Pos	Constructor	Points
1	(Italy) Ferrari	158
2	(France) Renault	79
3	(United Kingdom) BAR-Honda	62
4	(United Kingdom) Williams-BMW	37
5	(United Kingdom) McLaren-Mercedes	22

- Note: Only the top five positions are included for both sets of standings.

== See also ==
- 2004 Magny-Cours F3000 round

Previous race: 2004 United States Grand Prix	FIA Formula One World Championship; 2004 season	Next race: 2004 British Grand Prix
Previous race: 2003 French Grand Prix	French Grand Prix	Next race: 2005 French Grand Prix
