= David Pitchforth =

English engineer

- Born: April 21, 1965 (age 61)
- Citizenship: British citizen

David John Pitchforth (born 21 April 1965 in Huddersfield, West Yorkshire) is an English engineer, and former managing director Jaguar Racing Formula One team.

== Career ==
Pitchforth is an alumnus of the Huddersfield Polytechnic. Before he graduated, he had worked for a turbocharger company called Schwitzer Europe, Ltd. in 1981. Then he was appointed as a technical applications engineer, before finally concentrating more on the turbocharger and automobile cooling systems.

In 1994, he worked for Schwitzer AS, as head of design and application for engine cooling fans, fan drives, data validity, as well as operational wind tunnels and other test rigs.

In 1997, he was appointed as General Manager (GM) of the Auto Research Center (ARC). He handles design, construction, and runs Reynard Motorsports R&D facilities in the US, as well as a seven-post rig wind tunnel.

In 2000, he was appointed as managing director of ARC Reynard Motorsport. His job was to handle Reynard's test facilities and the engineering consulting business.

In 2002, he was employed by Ford Motor Company to become the managing director of the Jaguar Racing Formula 1 team. This position lasted until February 2005, when the team was bought by Red Bull.
