= Björn Wirdheim =

Swedish professional racing driver (born 1980)

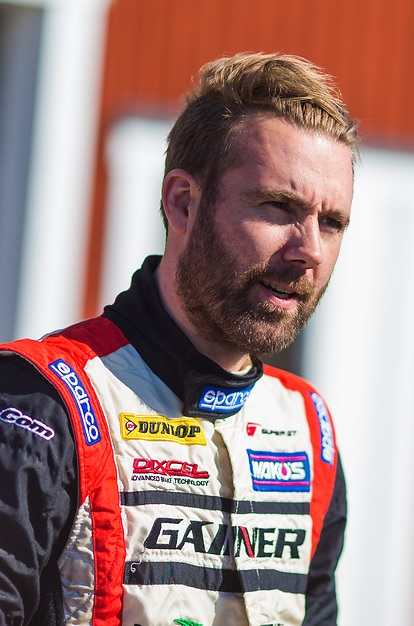
- Wirdheim in 2016
- Nationality: (Sweden) Swedish
- Born: Björn Karl Mikael Wirdheim; 4 April 1980 (age 46) Växjö, Sweden

Super GT career
- Debut season: 2006
- Current team: R'Qs Motor Sports
- Categorisation: FIA Platinum
- Car number: 22
- Former teams: Team LeMans, Kondo Racing, Gainer
- Starts: 92
- Wins: 4
- Podiums: 22
- Poles: 2
- Fastest laps: 5
- Best finish: 2nd in 2013, 2014

Previous series
- 1996 1996–97 1998 1998–99 2000–01 2002–03 2003–04 2005 2006 2006–07 2016: Formula Ford Sweden SSK; Sweden Formula Ford 1600; Formula Three Nordic; Formula Palmer Audi; German Formula Three Championship; International Formula 3000; Formula One testing Champ Car World Series; Camaro Cup Sweden; Formula Nippon; Scandinavian Touring Car Championship

Championship titles
- 2015 2003 1997: European Le Mans Series; International Formula 3000; Swedish Formula Ford 1600

Björn Karl Mikael Wirdheim (born 4 April 1980) is a Swedish professional racing driver. His main achievement to date is becoming the European Le Mans Series champion in 2015. He previously won the International Formula 3000 title in 2003, tested for the Jaguar F1 Team, and twice finished runner-up in Super GT's GT300 class.

Wirdheim is the son of Örnulf Wirdheim, also a racing driver.

== Career ==
Born in Växjö, Wirdheim began racing karts at age ten, until the age of fifteen, winning the Southern Swedish Karting Championship. In 1996, he progressed to single-seaters in Swedish Formula Ford 1600 Junior Championship where he took the championship title in 1997 with 17 wins. In 1998 and 1999, he raced in the Formula Palmer Audi Championship, achieving two podium finishes.

=== International Formula 3000 ===
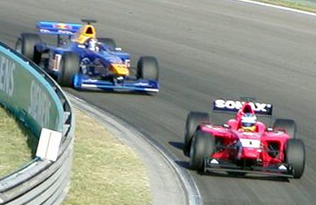
Wirdheim driving for Arden at the Hungary round of the 2003 International Formula 3000 season.

In 2000, Wirdheim switched to the German Formula Three Championship. Then, during 2001 in addition to winning at Nürburgring and A1-Ring, he took three pole positions including one at Macau Grand Prix. For the season of 2002 Wirdheim switched, this time to International Formula 3000, joining Arden International. He finished fourth overall, in addition to being named Rookie of the Year, and helping Arden to win the team title in the championship.

Wirdheim stayed with Arden in the following season of 2003 that would prove successful both for the team and driver. He dominated the championship so much that an obligatory pit stop for tire change was introduced at the end of the season in an attempt to level the advantage, but Arden managed to do better pit-stops overall than other teams and still came out on top. Wirdheim became the first Swede to win the championship in its 19-year history, breaking Justin Wilson's previous record of most points won in one season of the series. However, at Monaco, when driving to an easy win on the streets of Monte Carlo, Wirdheim slowed down to wave at his pit-crew believing he already had taken the chequered flag and was overtaken by Nicolas Kiesa, metres away from the actual finish line.

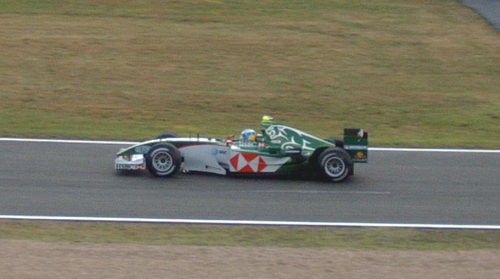
Wirdheim as Jaguar's third driver at the 2004 French Grand Prix.

At the end of 2003, Wirdheim had been noticed by several Formula One team bosses, giving him opportunity to test with both Jordan and BAR. After turning down an offer to drive Champ Car, Wirdheim signed with Jaguar as third driver performing the Friday testing for the team at Formula One Grand Prix weekends during the 2004 season.

=== Champ Car ===
For the 2005 season, Wirdheim turned to the Champ Car World Series to join the HVM racing team. Run by former Pacific F1 team boss Keith Wiggins, the team was underfunded after losing its previous Herdez backing, and a lack of testing made it difficult for the team to be competitive. After mediocre results, Wirdheim and the team decided to part ways after 11 races into the season.

=== Recent career ===
Wirdheim has since competed in the Japanese Formula Nippon series. Driving for Team Dandelion, a team with two constructors' championships and one drivers' title, Wirdheim finished sixth in the 2006 championship, with one second place as best and continued with the team in 2007. He has raced in Super GT since 2006, finishing second in the championship in 2013 and 2014. In 2016 he would dovetail his Super GT commitments with a drive for Flash Engineering in the Scandinavian Touring Car Championship.

While taking up a new challenge in 2018 as a Formula 1 TV-commentator for Viasat, Wirdheim has made guest appearances in Porsche Carrera Cup Scandinavia. In 2018, Wirdheim also won the 1966-1972 class of the Historic Grand Prix of Monaco in a March 711.

== Racing record ==
=== Complete International Formula 3000 results ===
(key) (Races in bold indicate pole position; races in italics indicate fastest lap.)

| Year | Entrant | 1 | 2 | 3 | 4 | 5 | 6 | 7 | 8 | 9 | 10 | 11 | 12 | DC | Points |
|---|---|---|---|---|---|---|---|---|---|---|---|---|---|---|---|
| 2002 | Arden Team Russia | INT; 5 | IMO; 7 | CAT; 8 | A1R; 2 | MON; Ret | NÜR; 6 | SIL; 6 | MAG; Ret | HOC; 2 | HUN; 4 | SPA; Ret | **MNZ**; 1 | 4th | 29 |
| 2003 | Arden International | **IMO**; 1 | CAT; 2 | A1R; 2 | **MON**; 2 | **NÜR**; 13 | MAG; 2 | **SIL**; 1 | HOC; 2 | HUN; 2 | **MNZ**; 1 | | | **1st** | **78** |

=== Complete Formula One participations ===
(key)

| Year | Entrant | Chassis | Engine | 1 | 2 | 3 | 4 | 5 | 6 | 7 | 8 | 9 | 10 | 11 | 12 | 13 | 14 | 15 | 16 | 17 | 18 | WDC | Points |
|---|---|---|---|---|---|---|---|---|---|---|---|---|---|---|---|---|---|---|---|---|---|---|---|
| 2003 | Jordan Ford | Jordan EJ13 | Ford V10 | AUS | MAL | BRA | SMR | ESP | AUT | MON | CAN | EUR | FRA | GBR | GER | HUN | ITA | USA; TD | JPN | | | - | - |
| 2004 | Jaguar Racing | Jaguar R5 | Cosworth V10 | AUS; TD | MAL; TD | BHR; TD | SMR; TD | ESP; TD | MON; TD | EUR; TD | CAN; TD | USA; TD | FRA; TD | GBR; TD | GER; TD | HUN; TD | BEL; TD | ITA; TD | CHN; TD | JPN; TD* | BRA; TD | – | – |

* Was entered as third driver, but did not run due to bad weather.

=== Complete Champ Car results ===
(key)

| Year | Team | No. | 1 | 2 | 3 | 4 | 5 | 6 | 7 | 8 | 9 | 10 | 11 | 12 | 13 | Rank | Points | Ref |
|---|---|---|---|---|---|---|---|---|---|---|---|---|---|---|---|---|---|---|
| 2005 | HVM Racing | 4 | LBH; 12 | MTY; 8 | MIL; 15 | POR; 9 | CLE; 15 | TOR; 15 | EDM; 15 | SJO; 8 | DEN; 11 | MTL; 13 | LVG; 6 | SRF | MXC | **14th** | **115** | |

=== Complete Formula Nippon results ===
(key) (Races in bold indicate pole position)

| Year | Entrant | 1 | 2 | 3 | 4 | 5 | 6 | 7 | 8 | 9 | DC | Points |
|---|---|---|---|---|---|---|---|---|---|---|---|---|
| 2006 | Dandelion Racing | FUJ; 4 | SUZ; 2 | MOT; 4 | SUZ; Ret | AUT; 6 | FUJ; 6 | SUG; 6 | MOT; 11 | SUZ; 9 | 6th | 13.5 |
| 2007 | Dandelion Racing | FUJ; 4 | SUZ; 13 | MOT; 11 | OKA; 11 | SUZ; 2 | FUJ; 8 | SUG; Ret | MOT; 7 | SUZ; 8 | 9th | 17 |

=== Complete Super GT results ===
| Year | Team | Car | Class | 1 | 2 | 3 | 4 | 5 | 6 | 7 | 8 | 9 | DC | Points |
|---|---|---|---|---|---|---|---|---|---|---|---|---|---|---|
| 2006 | Team LeMans | Lexus SC430 | GT500 | SUZ | OKA | FUJ | SEP | SUG | SUZ; Ret | MOT | AUT | FUJ | 29th | 0 |
| 2007 | Team LeMans | Lexus SC430 | GT500 | SUZ; 4 | OKA; 14 | FUJ; 3 | SEP; 9 | SUG; DNS | SUZ; 9 | MOT; 3 | AUT; 8 | FUJ; 16 | 9th | 38 |
| 2008 | Team LeMans | Lexus SC430 | GT500 | SUZ; 9 | OKA; 13 | FUJ; 6 | SEP; 8 | SUG; 7 | SUZ; 6 | MOT; 4 | AUT; 14 | FUJ; 3 | 13th | 39 |
| 2009 | Team LeMans | Lexus SC430 | GT500 | OKA; 10 | SUZ; 4 | FUJ; 6 | SEP; 14 | SUG; 5 | SUZ; Ret | FUJ; 5 | AUT; 10 | MOT; 4 | 12th | 35 |
| 2010 | Team LeMans | Lexus SC430 | GT500 | SUZ; 2 | OKA; 5 | FUJ; 3 | SEP; 4 | SUG; 3 | SUZ; 11 | FUJ; C | MOT; 12 | | 4th | 51 |
| 2011 | Kondo Racing | Nissan GT-R | GT500 | OKA; 9 | FUJ; 7 | SEP; 4 | SUG; 4 | SUZ; 10 | FUJ; 11 | AUT; 5 | MOT; 12 | | 10th | 29 |
| 2012 | Kondo Racing | Nissan GT-R | GT500 | OKA; 11 | FUJ; 14 | SEP; Ret | SUG; 10 | SUZ; 3 | FUJ; 13 | AUT; 4 | MOT; 11 | | 15th | 22 |
| 2013 | Gainer | Mercedes-Benz SLS AMG GT3 | GT300 | OKA; 1 | FUJ; 6 | SEP; 3 | SUG; 13 | SUZ; 6 | FUJ; 7 | FUJ; 2 | AUT; 4 | MOT; 1 | 2nd | 80 |
| 2014 | Gainer | Mercedes-Benz SLS AMG GT3 | GT300 | OKA; 3 | FUJ; 2 | AUT; 3 | SUG; Ret | FUJ; 2 | SUZ; 10 | BUR; 8 | **MOT**; 1 | | 2nd | 78 |
| 2015 | Gainer | Mercedes-Benz SLS AMG GT3 | GT300 | OKA; 12 | FUJ; 3 | CHA; 4 | FUJ; 3 | SUZ; 11 | SUG; 3 | AUT; Ret | MOT; 3 | | 5th | 52 |
| 2016 | Gainer | Mercedes-AMG GT | GT300 | OKA; 4 | FUJ; Ret | SUG; 4 | FUJ; 7 | SUZ; Ret | CHA; 9 | **MOT**; 4 | MOT; 10 | | 9th | 32 |
| 2017 | Gainer | Mercedes-AMG GT3 | GT300 | OKA; 18 | FUJ; 2 | AUT; 22 | SUG; 1 | FUJ; 17 | SUZ; 9 | CHA; 8 | MOT; 7 | | 6th | 45 |
| 2019 | R'Qs Motor Sports | Mercedes-AMG GT3 | GT300 | OKA | FUJ | SUZ | CHA | FUJ; 23 | AUT | SUG | MOT | | 49th | 0 |

=== Complete FIA World Endurance Championship results ===
| Year | Entrant | Class | Car | Engine | 1 | 2 | 3 | 4 | 5 | 6 | 7 | 8 | Rank | Points |
|---|---|---|---|---|---|---|---|---|---|---|---|---|---|---|
| 2013 | Greaves Motorsport | LMP2 | Zytek Z11SN | Nissan VK45DE 4.5 L V8 | SIL | SPA | LMS | SÃO; 4 | COA | | SHA; 5 | BHR; 3 | 17th | 18 |
| 2013 | GAINER International | LMP2 | Zytek Z11SN | Nissan VK45DE 4.5 L V8 | | | | | | FUJ; 3 | | | 17th | 18 |

=== Complete European Le Mans Series results ===
| Year | Entrant | Class | Chassis | Engine | 1 | 2 | 3 | 4 | 5 | 6 | Rank | Points |
|---|---|---|---|---|---|---|---|---|---|---|---|---|
| 2015 | Greaves Motorsport | LMP2 | Gibson 015S | Nissan VK45DE 4.5 L V8 | **SIL**; 1 | IMO; 4 | RBR; 4 | LEC; 1 | EST; 2 | | 1st | 93 |
| 2016 | Krohn Racing | LMP2 | Ligier JS P2 | Nissan VK45DE 4.5 L V8 | SIL; 4 | IMO; 6 | RBR | LEC | SPA | EST | 16th | 20 |

=== Complete Scandinavian Touring Car Championship results ===
(key) (Races in bold indicate pole position) (Races in italics indicate fastest lap)

| Year | Team | Car | 1 | 2 | 3 | 4 | 5 | 6 | 7 | 8 | 9 | 10 | 11 | 12 | 13 | 14 | DC | Points |
|---|---|---|---|---|---|---|---|---|---|---|---|---|---|---|---|---|---|---|
| 2016 | Flash Engineering | Saab 9-3 | SKÖ; 1 | SKÖ; 2 | MAN; 1; 2 | MAN; 2; 4 | AND; 1; 5 | AND; 2; 4 | FAL; 1; 4 | FAL; 2 Ret | KAR; 1; 5 | KAR; 2; 1 | **SOL**; **1**; 2 | SOL; 2 Ret | KNU; 1; 4 | KNU; 2; 3 | 4th | 220 |

Sporting positions
| Preceded by Sébastien Bourdais | International Formula 3000; Champion; 2003 | Succeeded by Vitantonio Liuzzi |
| Preceded by Oliver Webb; Nelson Panciatici; Paul-Loup Chatin | European Le Mans Series; Champion; 2015; With: Jon Lancaster & Gary Hirsch | Succeeded by Harry Tincknell; Giedo van der Garde; Simon Dolan |
