= 2003 Hungaroring F3000 round =

- Race 9 of 10 in the 2003 International Formula 3000 Championship

Race details
- Date: 23 August 2003
- Course: Permanent racing facility
- Course length: 4.381 km (2.722 miles)
- Distance: 35 laps, 153.440 km (95.347 miles)

Pole position
| Driver | (Italy) Vitantonio Liuzzi | Red Bull Junior Team F3000 |
- Time: 1:36.092

Fastest lap
| Driver | (Austria) Patrick Friesacher | Red Bull Junior Team F3000 |
- Time: 1:36.809 on lap 20

Podium
| First | (Austria) Patrick Friesacher | Red Bull Junior Team F3000 |
| Second | (Sweden) Björn Wirdheim | Arden International |
| Third | (United States) Townsend Bell | Arden International |

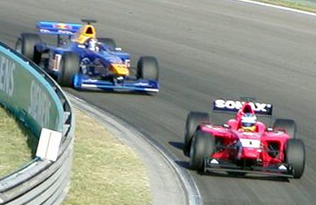
Björn Wirdheim and Patrick Friesacher

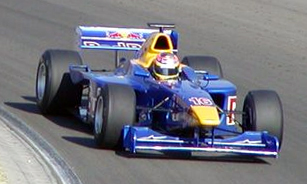
Vitantonio Liuzzi

The 2003 Hungaroring F3000 round was a motor racing event held on 23 August 2003 at the Hungaroring, Mogyoród, Hungary. It was the penultimate round of the 2003 International Formula 3000 Championship, and was held in support of the 2003 Hungarian Grand Prix.

This was the first Formula 3000 race to feature been introduced mandatory pit stop.

== Classification ==
=== Qualifying ===
| Pos. | No. | Driver | Team | Time | Gap | Grid |
|---|---|---|---|---|---|---|
| 1 | 16 | (Italy) Vitantonio Liuzzi | Red Bull Junior Team F3000 | 1:36.092 | | 1 |
| 2 | 9 | (Italy) Giorgio Pantano | Durango | 1:36.563 | +0.471 | 2 |
| 3 | 17 | (Austria) Patrick Friesacher | Red Bull Junior Team F3000 | 1:36.614 | +0.522 | 3 |
| 4 | 2 | (United States) Townsend Bell | Arden International | 1:36.621 | +0.529 | 4 |
| 5 | 1 | (Sweden) Björn Wirdheim | Arden International | 1:36.649 | +0.557 | 5 |
| 6 | 3 | (Brazil) Ricardo Sperafico | Coloni Motorsport | 1:36.655 | +0.563 | 6 |
| 7 | 14 | (Czech Republic) Jaroslav Janiš | Superfund ISR - Charouz | 1:36.656 | +0.564 | 7 |
| 8 | 6 | (Italy) Enrico Toccacelo | Super Nova Racing | 1:36.879 | +0.787 | 8 |
| 9 | 4 | (Hungary) Zsolt Baumgartner | Coloni Motorsport | 1:36.881 | +0.789 | 9 |
| 10 | 11 | (Germany) Tony Schmidt | Team Astromega | 1:37.272 | +1.180 | 10 |
| 11 | 10 | (Italy) Raffaele Giammaria | Durango | 1:37.828 | +1.736 | 11 |
| 12 | 19 | (Italy) Giovanni Berton | BCN F3000 | 1:38.788 | +2.696 | 12 |
| 13 | 5 | (United Kingdom) Sam Hancock | Super Nova Racing | 1:38.833 | +2.741 | 13 |
| 14 | 18 | (Italy) Ferdinando Monfardini | BCN F3000 | 1:39.358 | +3.266 | 14 |
Lähde:

=== Race ===
| Pos | No | Driver | Team | Laps | Time/Retired | Grid | Points |
|---|---|---|---|---|---|---|---|
| 1 | 17 | (Austria) Patrick Friesacher | Red Bull Junior Team F3000 | 35 | 58:02.294 | 3 | 10 |
| 2 | 1 | (Sweden) Björn Wirdheim | Arden International | 35 | +23.745 | 5 | 8 |
| 3 | 2 | (United States) Townsend Bell | Arden International | 35 | +24.306 | 4 | 6 |
| 4 | 9 | (Italy) Giorgio Pantano | Durango | 35 | +26.440 | 2 | 5 |
| 5 | 14 | (Czech Republic) Jaroslav Janiš | Superfund ISR - Charouz | 35 | +27.081 | 7 | 4 |
| 6 | 10 | (Italy) Raffaele Giammaria | Durango | 35 | +32.089 | 11 | 3 |
| 7 | 6 | (Italy) Enrico Toccacelo | Super Nova Racing | 35 | +37.500 | 8 | 2 |
| 8 | 11 | (Germany) Tony Schmidt | Team Astromega | 35 | +39.963 | 10 | 1 |
| 9 | 16 | (Italy) Vitantonio Liuzzi | Red Bull Junior Team F3000 | 35 | +51.899 | 1 | |
| 10 | 19 | (Italy) Giovanni Berton | BCN F3000 | 34 | +1 lap | 12 | |
| 11 | 5 | (United Kingdom) Sam Hancock | Super Nova Racing | 34 | +1 lap | 13 | |
| Ret | 18 | (Italy) Ferdinando Monfardini | BCN F3000 | 30 | Retired | 14 | |
| Ret | 3 | (Brazil) Ricardo Sperafico | Coloni Motorsport | 11 | Retired | 6 | |
| DNS | 4 | (Hungary) Zsolt Baumgartner | Coloni Motorsport | 0 | Did not start | 9 | |
Lähde:

== Standings after the event ==
Drivers' Championship standings

| | Pos. | Driver | Points |
|---|---|---|---|
| | 1 | (Sweden) Björn Wirdheim | 68 |
| 1 | 2 | (Italy) Giorgio Pantano | 41 |
| 1 | 3 | (Brazil) Ricardo Sperafico | 37 |
| | 4 | (Italy) Vitantonio Liuzzi | 34 |
| | 5 | (Italy) Enrico Toccacelo | 29 |

Teams' Championship standings

| Pos. | Team | Points |
|---|---|---|
| 1 | (United Kingdom) Arden International | 85 |
| 2 | (Austria) Red Bull Junior Team F3000 | 62 |
| 3 | (Italy) Durango | 55 |
| 4 | (Italy) Coloni Motorsport | 43 |
| 5 | (Czech Republic) Superfund ISR - Charouz | 31 |

- Note: Only the top five positions are included for both sets of standings.

== See also ==
- 2003 Hungarian Grand Prix

| Previous round: 2003 Hockenheimring F3000 round | International Formula 3000 Championship; 2003 season | Next round: 2003 Monza F3000 round |
| Previous round: 2002 Hungaroring F3000 round | Hungaroring F3000 round | Next round: 2004 Hungaroring F3000 round |
