= 2004 Chinese Grand Prix =

Coordinates: 31°20′20″N 121°13′11″E

Race 16 of 18 in the 2004 Formula One World Championship
← Previous race	Next race →

Race details
- Date: 26 September 2004
- Official name: 2004 Formula 1 Sinopec Chinese Grand Prix
- Location: Shanghai International Circuit; Shanghai, China
- Course: Permanent Racing Facility
- Course length: 5.451 km (3.387 miles)
- Distance: 56 laps, 305.066 km (189.559 miles)
- Weather: Sunny with temperatures reaching up to 27 °C (81 °F)

Pole position
Driver	(Brazil) Rubens Barrichello	Ferrari
- Time: 1:34.012

Fastest lap
Driver	(Germany) Michael Schumacher	Ferrari
- Time: 1:32.238 on lap 55 (lap record)

Podium
First	(Brazil) Rubens Barrichello	Ferrari
Second	(United Kingdom) Jenson Button	BAR-Honda
Third	(Finland) Kimi Räikkönen	McLaren-Mercedes

The 2004 Chinese Grand Prix (officially the 2004 Formula 1 Sinopec Chinese Grand Prix) was a Formula One motor race held on 26 September 2004 at the Shanghai International Circuit. It was Race 16 of 18 in the 2004 FIA Formula One World Championship and was the inaugural Chinese Grand Prix.

The 56-lap race was won by Rubens Barrichello for the Ferrari team, from a pole position start. Jenson Button finished second for the BAR team, with Kimi Räikkönen third in a McLaren. It was Barrichello's last win for Ferrari and his last until the 2009 European Grand Prix for Brawn GP.

== Friday drivers ==
The bottom 6 teams in the 2003 Constructors' Championship were entitled to run a third car in free practice on Friday. These drivers drove on Friday but did not compete in qualifying or the race.

Constructor	No	Driver
BAR-Honda	35	(United Kingdom) Anthony Davidson
Sauber-Petronas		-
Jaguar-Cosworth	37	(Sweden) Björn Wirdheim
Toyota	38	(Australia) Ryan Briscoe
Jordan-Ford	39	(Netherlands) Robert Doornbos
Minardi-Cosworth	40	(Belgium) Bas Leinders

== Report ==
=== Background ===
Michael Schumacher and Ferrari were already the drivers' and constructors' world champions. After the 2004 Italian Grand Prix, Schumacher unassailably led the drivers' standings with 38 points ahead of Rubens Barrichello and 65 points ahead of Jenson Button. Ferrari led the constructors' championship by 140 points, unassailable ahead of BAR and 143 points ahead of Renault.

Renault fired Jarno Trulli after the Italian Grand Prix and was replaced by Jacques Villeneuve, who returned to driving a single-seater after almost a year of inactivity. The dismissal of the Italian driver was due to disagreements with team manager Flavio Briatore, who also dominated the Italian driver's career and who the previous week had signed a contract with Toyota for 2005. This was the first race back for Ralf Schumacher after injuries in the 2004 United States Grand Prix three months prior. At Jordan, Timo Glock replaced Giorgio Pantano, who will give up participation in the last three Grand Prix races of the season without paying the last installment according to the contract.

The race was the first where radio conversations between teams and drivers were broadcast to television viewers.

=== Practice ===
The BAR of test driver Anthony Davidson takes to the track in friday free practice with a special yellow-blue livery, inspired by that of the Subaru Impreza 555 and which replaces the main seasonal sponsor Lucky Strike with State Express 555. The intention was to use it throughout the weekend. However, this was suspended by the federation so that for qualifying and the race, while retaining the temporary 555 sponsorship, the season's canonical white livery was more or less restored.

=== Qualifying ===
Barrichello set the fastest lap and took pole position ahead of Räikkönen and Button. The Bridgestone tyres worked particularly well in this section and Sauber driver Massa managed to achieve the best starting position of his career up to that point with fourth place.

=== Race ===
After changing the engine during the night, Michael Schumacher started from the pit lane and started the race with a full tank. Barrichello maintained his lead at the start ahead of Räikkönen. Alonso took third place ahead of Massa and Button. The Briton regained position from the Sauber driver on the third lap after an intense duel. A lap later, Massa was also overtaken by Fisichella and Ralf Schumacher. Meanwhile, Michael Schumacher was struggling to get himself back together and was stuck in seventeenth behind the Toyota of Panis, which got off to a terrible start due to a launch control problem. On lap six, Button also overtook Alonso and moved up to third place, the BAR driver immediately setting the fastest lap of the race. After ten laps of the race, Massa opened the first series of pit stops. Shortly afterwards, Michael Schumacher touched Klien while trying to overtake the Austrian. While Michael Schumacher was able to continue driving, Klien's race was over due to damaged suspension.

Barrichello and Räikkönen refuelled together on lap 12. The Brazilian kept the Finn behind him. Alonso and Button stayed on the track one and two laps longer respectively and retained fourth and third place. Further back in the field Michael Schumacher spun, losing further time. The German driver was the last to refuel on the 20th lap after overtaking both Fisichella and his brother.

At the head of the race, Barrichello struggled to contain Räikkönen; the Ferrari driver's margin over the Finn remained firmly under one second. In third position followed, a little further behind, Button; However, the British driver started with a two-stop strategy, compared to his rivals' three. Alonso retained his fourth place, ahead of Ralf Schumacher, Fisichella and Coulthard. Räikkönen refuelled for the second time on lap 27; when Barrichello also made his second pit stop, two laps later, his advantage over the Finn increased. Button then took the lead, refuelling on lap 35. At the same moment, Michael Schumacher punctured a tyre, losing even more ground to the lead. Toyota driver Zonta retired with gearbox damage.

On lap 36, Räikkönen made his third and final pit stop, anticipating it in an attempt to overtake Barrichello; However, the Finn returned to the track behind Button, in third place. One lap later, Coulthard and Ralf Schumacher came into contact while fighting for seventh place; the Briton rammed the Williams driver and both were forced into the pits, Coulthard to replace a punctured tyre and Ralf Schumacher to carry out checks. However, the German driver returned to the pits just as his team was waiting for Montoya; Schumacher therefore lost two laps and, after carrying out a test lap, returned to the pits definitively. A little later, Minardi driver Bruni, who had lost a wheel, also retired.

Meanwhile, Barrichello pushed hard to increase his lead over Button as much as possible; when the Brazilian refuelled during the 42nd lap, the BAR driver remained behind him. In the final laps Barrichello managed his advantage over his pursuers, who approached the Ferrari driver but never seriously threatened him.

Barrichello then obtained his second consecutive victory, ahead of Button, Räikkönen, Alonso, Montoya, Sato, Fisichella and Massa; Villeneuve, returning after a year of inactivity, took only eleventh place, finishing ahead of Michael Schumacher. In the fight for second place in the Constructors' Championship, BAR gained further points over Renault, having overtaken it in the standings in the previous Grand Prix.

== Classification ==
=== Qualifying ===
Pos	No	Driver	Constructor	Q1 Time	Q2 Time	Gap	Grid
1	2	(Brazil) Rubens Barrichello	Ferrari	1:33.787	1:34.012	—	1
2	6	(Finland) Kimi Räikkönen	McLaren-Mercedes	1:33.499	1:34.178	+0.166	2
3	9	(United Kingdom) Jenson Button	BAR-Honda	1:34.273	1:34.295	+0.283	3
4	12	(Brazil) Felipe Massa	Sauber-Petronas	1:33.816	1:34.759	+0.747	4
5	4	(Germany) Ralf Schumacher	Williams-BMW	1:33.849	1:34.891	+0.879	5
6	8	(Spain) Fernando Alonso	Renault	1:34.599	1:34.917	+0.905	6
7	11	(Italy) Giancarlo Fisichella	Sauber-Petronas	1:33.738	1:34.951	+0.939	7
8	17	(France) Olivier Panis	Toyota	1:34.153	1:34.975	+0.962	8
9	10	(Japan) Takuma Sato	BAR-Honda	1:34.051	1:34.993	+0.981	18^{3}
10	5	(United Kingdom) David Coulthard	McLaren-Mercedes	1:34.355	1:35.029	+1.017	9
11	3	(Colombia) Juan Pablo Montoya	Williams-BMW	1:34.016	1:35.245	+1.233	10
12	14	(Australia) Mark Webber	Jaguar-Cosworth	1:34.334	1:35.286	+1.274	11
13	7	(Canada) Jacques Villeneuve	Renault	1:34.425	1:35.384	+1.372	12
14	16	(Brazil) Ricardo Zonta	Toyota	1:34.958	1:35.410	+1.398	13
15	18	(Germany) Nick Heidfeld	Jordan-Ford	1:34.808	1:36.507	+2.495	14
16	15	(Austria) Christian Klien	Jaguar-Cosworth	1:35.447	1:36.535	+2.523	15
17	19	(Germany) Timo Glock	Jordan-Ford	1:37.143	1:37.410	+3.398	16
18	21	(Hungary) Zsolt Baumgartner	Minardi-Cosworth	1:37.510	1:40.240	+6.228	19^{3}
19	1	(Germany) Michael Schumacher	Ferrari	1:33.185	No time^{1}		20^{3}
20	20	(Italy) Gianmaria Bruni	Minardi-Cosworth	1:36.623	No time^{2}		17

Notes

- ^1 – Michael Schumacher did not get a time in Q2 after spinning off the track at turn 1.
- ^2 – Gianmaria Bruni did not get a time in Q2 after spinning off the track at turn 1.
- ^3 – Takuma Sato, Zsolt Baumgartner and Michael Schumacher received a 10-place grid penalty for engine changes.

=== Race ===
Pos	No	Driver	Constructor	Tyre	Laps	Time/Retired	Grid	Points
1	2	(Brazil) Rubens Barrichello	Ferrari	B	56	1:29:12.420	1	10
2	9	(United Kingdom) Jenson Button	BAR-Honda	M	56	+ 1.035	3	8
3	6	(Finland) Kimi Räikkönen	McLaren-Mercedes	M	56	+ 1.469	2	6
4	8	(Spain) Fernando Alonso	Renault	M	56	+ 32.510	6	5
5	3	(Colombia) Juan Pablo Montoya	Williams-BMW	M	56	+ 45.193	10	4
6	10	(Japan) Takuma Sato	BAR-Honda	M	56	+ 54.791	18	3
7	11	(Italy) Giancarlo Fisichella	Sauber-Petronas	B	56	+ 1:05.454	7	2
8	12	(Brazil) Felipe Massa	Sauber-Petronas	B	56	+ 1:20.080	4	1
9	5	(United Kingdom) David Coulthard	McLaren-Mercedes	M	56	+ 1:20.619	9	
10	14	(Australia) Mark Webber	Jaguar-Cosworth	M	55	+ 1 Lap	11	
11	7	(Canada) Jacques Villeneuve	Renault	M	55	+ 1 Lap	12	
12	1	(Germany) Michael Schumacher	Ferrari	B	55	+ 1 Lap	PL^{4}	
13	18	(Germany) Nick Heidfeld	Jordan-Ford	B	55	+ 1 Lap	14	
14	17	(France) Olivier Panis	Toyota	M	55	+1 Lap	8	
15	19	(Germany) Timo Glock	Jordan-Ford	B	55	+1 Lap	16	
16	21	(Hungary) Zsolt Baumgartner	Minardi-Cosworth	B	53	+3 Laps	19	
Ret	20	(Italy) Gianmaria Bruni	Minardi-Cosworth	B	38	Mechanical	17	
Ret	4	(Germany) Ralf Schumacher	Williams-BMW	M	37	Collision damage	5	
Ret	16	(Brazil) Ricardo Zonta	Toyota	M	35	Transmission	13	
Ret	15	(Austria) Christian Klien	Jaguar-Cosworth	M	11	Suspension	15	

Notes

- ^4 – Michael Schumacher started the race from the pitlane.

== Championship standings after the race ==
- Bold text and an asterisk indicates the World Champions.

Drivers' Championship standings

	Pos	Driver	Points
	1	(Germany) Michael Schumacher*	136
	2	(Brazil) Rubens Barrichello	108
	3	(United Kingdom) Jenson Button	79
1	4	(Spain) Fernando Alonso	50
1	5	(Italy) Jarno Trulli	46

Constructors' Championship standings

Pos	Constructor	Points
1	(Italy) Ferrari*	244
2	(United Kingdom) BAR-Honda	105
3	(France) Renault	96
4	(United Kingdom) Williams-BMW	64
5	(United Kingdom) McLaren-Mercedes	58

- Note: Only the top five positions are included for both sets of standings.

Previous race: 2004 Italian Grand Prix	FIA Formula One World Championship; 2004 season	Next race: 2004 Japanese Grand Prix
Previous race: None	Chinese Grand Prix	Next race: 2005 Chinese Grand Prix
