= Jordan EJ13 =

Formula One racing car

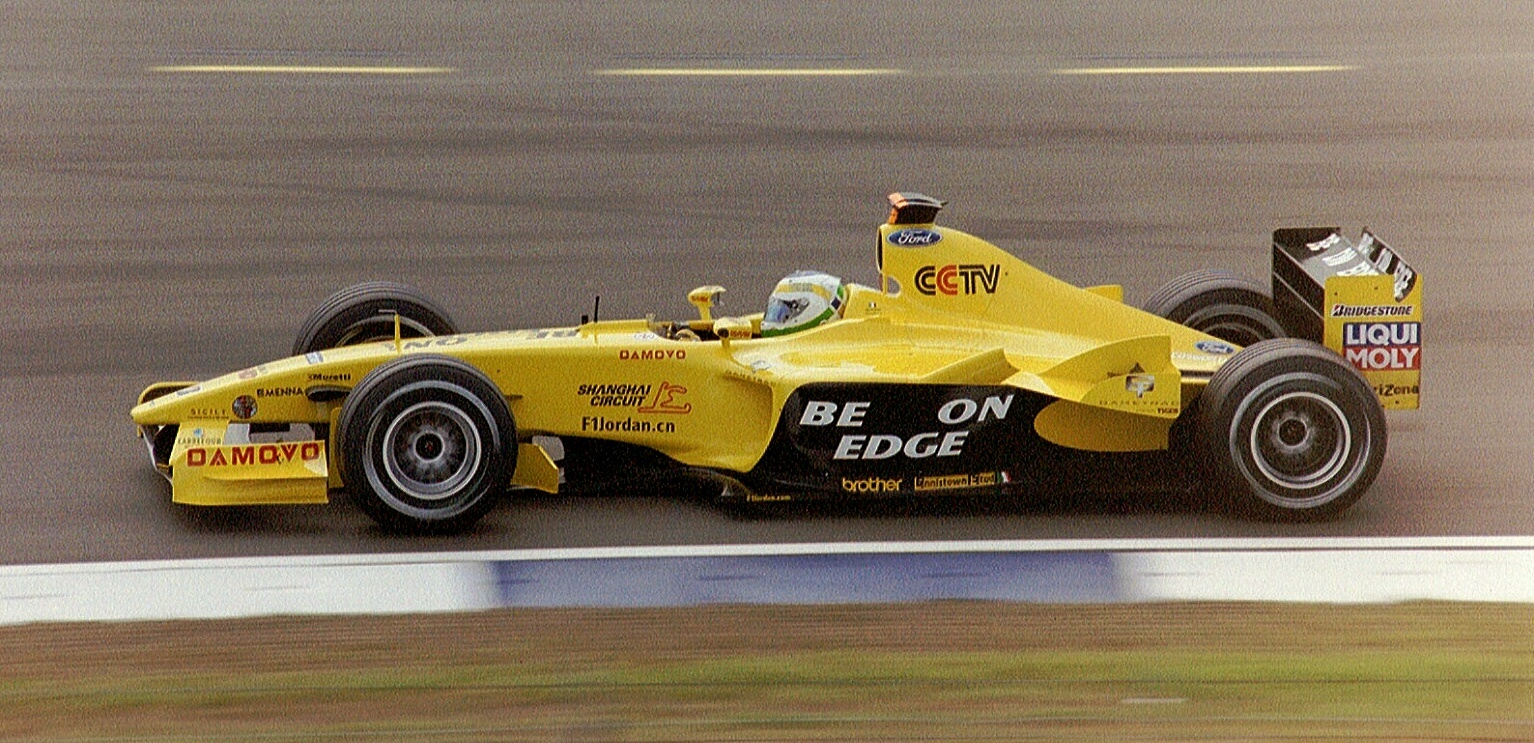
- Giancarlo Fisichella driving the EJ13 at the 2003 British Grand Prix
- Category: Formula One
- Constructor: Jordan
- Designers: Gary Anderson (Technical Director); Henri Durand (Design and Development Director); John McQuilliam (Chief Designer); Stephen Taylor (Head of Composite Design); Ian Hall (Head of Transmission Design); Mike Wroe (Head of Electronics); Nicolò Petrucci (Head of Aerodynamics)
- Predecessor: EJ12
- Successor: EJ14

Technical specifications
- Engine: Ford RS1 (Cosworth CR-4) 90° V10, NA, mid-engine, longitudinally-mounted
- Transmission: Jordan, 7-speed, longitudinal, semi-automatic
- Power: 810 hp @ 17,500 rpm
- Fuel: BP
- Lubricants: Castrol
- Tyres: Bridgestone

Competition history
- Notable entrants: Benson and Hedges Jordan Ford
- Notable drivers: 11. (Italy) Giancarlo Fisichella; 12. (Republic of Ireland) Ralph Firman; 12. (Hungary) Zsolt Baumgartner
- Debut: 2003 Australian Grand Prix
- First win: 2003 Brazilian Grand Prix
- Last win: 2003 Brazilian Grand Prix
- Last event: 2003 Japanese Grand Prix
Races	Wins	Podiums	Poles	F/Laps
16	1	1	0	0
- Constructors' Championships: 0
- Drivers' Championships: 0

The Jordan EJ13 was the car with which the Jordan team competed in the 2003 Formula One World Championship. The car was designed by Gary Anderson and Nicolò Petrucci and driven by Giancarlo Fisichella, Ralph Firman and Zsolt Baumgartner who replaced Firman who was injured for two races.

== Overview ==
The team slumped due to lack of sponsorship and Honda left Jordan to concentrate on their partnership with BAR. Jordan had to make do with 2002-specification Cosworth CR-4 engines badged as Ford RS1, and the season was not regarded as a success. The EJ13 debuted in January 2003 in Barcelona.

Despite beating only Minardi to rank 9th in the standings, Jordan won in 2003. The victory came under extraordinary circumstances in the 2003 Brazilian Grand Prix which took place in torrential weather conditions. Following a massive accident on the start / finish straight, the race was red flagged and stopped. After some initial confusion, Giancarlo Fisichella was initially ruled to have finished a still remarkable second behind Kimi Räikkönen who took the top step on the podium. However, an FIA inquiry several days later led to Fisichella being officially declared the winner of his first F1 race. Fisichella was, therefore, unable to celebrate his first career victory on the top step of the podium, although he and Räikkönen swapped trophies in a presentation at the following Grand Prix. Aside from the unlikely win, neither Fisichella or new teammate Ralph Firman were able to have any sort of success in their Jordans. After Firman was injured in practice for the 2003 Hungarian Grand Prix Jordan fielded the first ever Hungarian Formula One driver, Zsolt Baumgartner. Firman returned for the final two events, but was unable to add to the point he won in Spain. Fisichella only managed two points on top of his victory and unhappy at the team's slump he departed for Sauber.

== Sponsorship and livery ==
As in previous years, the basic color of the car was yellow; The front and rear wings, T-cam and side pods were black. The main sponsor remained the tobacco brand Benson & Hedges, which was replaced by the Benson + Hedges variation which advertised on both wings, the nose, the side pods and on the driver's helmets, even if it only provided a fraction of the funds that, for example, were available for 2000 and 2001. Other sponsors including Liqui Moly, CCTV and Brother. Eddie Jordan launched their own vodka drink V-10, named after V-10 engine and his rock band.

Jordan used the Benson & Hedges logos, except at the French, British and United States Grands Prix; which was replaced with text "Be on Edge" (Benson & Hedges minus the 'n', 's','&', 'H' and 's').

In Brazilian, Jordan celebrated their 200th Grand Prix, and their cars had a sticker on the side pontoon commemorating the achievement, reading "Jordan 200".

In June 2003 Jordan sued mobile phone company Vodafone for £150 million, claiming that the company had made a verbal contract for a three-year sponsorship, then gave it to Ferrari instead. Jordan withdrew the action two months later, agreeing to pay Vodafone's costs. This was a double financial blow from which the team did not recover. The judge was highly critical of Eddie Jordan, branding the allegations against Vodafone "without foundation and false".

Jordan used an alternative livery with Sobranie logos during a demonstration run by Firman at the Macau Grand Prix.

== Later use ==
The chassis driven by Giancarlo Fisichella in his debut win at Interlagos is currently hanging in the wall of Brazilian TV show host Otávio Mesquita's living room. According to Mesquita, he acquired the model, which was sold without the engine and gearbox, from a deceased Jordan ex-director in 2007. In that same year, Fisichella autographed the front nose of the car during a house party for the inauguration of Mesquita's mansion.

Another EJ13 chassis was occasionally used in BOSS GP, especially in 2018 and 2019.

== Complete Formula One results ==
(key) (results in bold indicate pole position)

Year	Team	Engine	Tyres	Drivers	1	2	3	4	5	6	7	8	9	10	11	12	13	14	15	16	Points	WCC
2003	Jordan	Ford Cosworth V10	**B**		AUS	MAL	BRA	SMR	ESP	AUT	MON	CAN	EUR	FRA	GBR	GER	HUN	ITA	USA	JPN	13	9th
2003	Jordan	Ford Cosworth V10	**B**	(Italy) Giancarlo Fisichella	12^{†}	Ret	1	15^{†}	Ret	Ret	10	Ret	12	Ret	Ret	13^{†}	Ret	10	7	Ret	13	9th
2003	Jordan	Ford Cosworth V10	**B**	(Republic of Ireland) Ralph Firman	Ret	10	Ret	Ret	8	11	12	Ret	11	15	13	Ret	WD		Ret	14	13	9th
2003	Jordan	Ford Cosworth V10	**B**	(Hungary) Zsolt Baumgartner													Ret	11			13	9th
