= 2004 Brazilian Grand Prix =

Coordinates: 23°42′13″S 46°41′59″W

Race 18 of 18 in the 2004 Formula One World Championship
← Previous race	Next race →

Race details
- Date: 24 October 2004
- Official name: Formula 1 Grande Prêmio do Brasil 2004
- Location: Autódromo José Carlos Pace, São Paulo, Brazil
- Course: Permanent racing facility
- Course length: 4.309 km (2.677 miles)
- Distance: 71 laps, 305.909 km (190.083 miles)
- Weather: Dry/Wet

Pole position
Driver	(Brazil) Rubens Barrichello	Ferrari
- Time: 1:10.646

Fastest lap
Driver	(Colombia) Juan Pablo Montoya	Williams-BMW
- Time: 1:11.473 on lap 49

Podium
First	(Colombia) Juan Pablo Montoya	Williams-BMW
Second	(Finland) Kimi Räikkönen	McLaren-Mercedes
Third	(Brazil) Rubens Barrichello	Ferrari

The 2004 Brazilian Grand Prix (officially the Formula 1 Grande Prêmio do Brasil 2004) was a Formula One motor race held on 24 October 2004 at the Autódromo José Carlos Pace. It was Race 18 of 18 in the 2004 FIA Formula One World Championship. It marked the first time that a GP in Brazil was held at the end of the F1 season. Juan Pablo Montoya won the race after starting from second on the grid, Kimi Räikkönen finished second after starting third and Rubens Barrichello finished third, his only podium finish at his home event.

== Friday drivers ==
The bottom 6 teams in the 2003 Constructors' Championship were entitled to run a third car in free practice on Friday. These drivers drove on Friday but did not compete in qualifying or the race.

Constructor	Nat	Driver
BAR-Honda	(United Kingdom)	Anthony Davidson
Sauber-Petronas		-
Jaguar-Cosworth	(Sweden)	Björn Wirdheim
Toyota	(Australia)	Ryan Briscoe
Jordan-Ford	(Netherlands)	Robert Doornbos
Minardi-Cosworth	(Belgium)	Bas Leinders

== Report ==
=== Background ===
Ricardo Zonta returned to his home race for the Toyota team, replacing Olivier Panis, who had retired from the sport after the previous race. It was the last race for Gianmaria Bruni and Zsolt Baumgartner and the Jaguar team. It was also the last race in which Sid Watkins took part in the role of medical officer.

=== Qualifying ===
In qualifying, Barrichello also achieved the fastest lap and secured pole position ahead of Montoya and Räikkönen. It was Barrichello's 13th career pole and his last until the 2009 Brazilian Grand Prix.

=== Race ===
The race started with a damp track. Most drivers began on intermediate tyres, with only Alonso, Villeneuve and Coulthard opting for dry tyres. At the start, Barrichello maintained the lead, but the Brazilian driver was overtaken after a few corners by Räikkönen. Montoya, however, got off to a bad start and was relegated to fourth place. The intermediate tires soon proved to be unsuitable for the track, which began to dry out. The first to mount dry tires was Ralf Schumacher, during the 4th lap, and he was followed by every other driver still on intermediate tires, handing Alonso the lead of the race. Meanwhile, Räikkönen and Montoya engaged in an intense duel exiting the pit lane, with the Colombian getting the better of his rival. After tire changes, Alonso led ahead of Montoya, Räikkönen, Ralf Schumacher, Sato, Barrichello, Villeneuve and Coulthard. Alonso gave up first place to Montoya at the end of the 18th lap when he returned to the pits to refuel.

On lap 23, Webber attempted to overtake his teammate Klien, but the two came into contact. Webber was forced to retire, while Klien returned to the pits to repair his car. At the head of the race, Räikkönen followed Montoya closely, but the Williams driver managed to control him without any particular problems. Further back, Barrichello tries to recover from Sato. The second series of pit stops brings no changes in position between these four drivers, but allows Alonso to move up to third place, ahead of Ralf Schumacher. On lap 32, however, Sato makes a mistake at the first braking, giving up fifth place to Barrichello. Montoya had a good lead over Räikkönen and was driving a car with more fuel.

The third series of pit stops proved decisive. Alonso, the only one among the leading drivers to make two stops, refueled on lap 47, followed in sequence by Ralf Schumacher, Barrichello, Montoya and Michael Schumacher, who returned to the pits at the same time on lap 50. Räikkönen, leading the race, pushed hard to try to overtake his rival, but when the Finn also made his pit stop, on lap 55, he returned to the track just one second behind Montoya. Behind him, Barrichello prevailed against his direct competitors in the duel for third place. A queue of cars formed behind him, with Alonso a few tenths ahead of Sato, Ralf Schumacher and Michael Schumacher. At the front of the race, Räikkönen tried in vain to put pressure on Montoya, but the Colombian was not distracted and took his first win of the season ahead of Räikkönen, Barrichello, Alonso and Ralf Schumacher. For Montoya it was the 4th victory of his career, and for Williams it was the last victory until the 2012 Spanish Grand Prix. It would be Barrichello's first finish at Interlagos in ten years and his only podium, with third place; his previous finish at the circuit being at the season opening in 1994 (a fourth place).

== Classification ==
=== Qualifying ===
Pos	No	Driver	Constructor	Q1 Time	Q2 Time	Gap	Grid
1	2	(Brazil) Rubens Barrichello	Ferrari	1:09.822	1:10.646	—	1
2	3	(Colombia) Juan Pablo Montoya	Williams-BMW	1:09.862	1:10.850	+0.204	2
3	6	(Finland) Kimi Räikkönen	McLaren-Mercedes	1:10.440	1:10.892	+0.246	3
4	12	(Brazil) Felipe Massa	Sauber-Petronas	1:09.930	1:10.922	+0.276	4
5	9	(United Kingdom) Jenson Button	BAR-Honda	1:10.607	1:11.092	+0.446	5
6	10	(Japan) Takuma Sato	BAR-Honda	1:10.373	1:11.120	+0.474	6
7	4	(Germany) Ralf Schumacher	Williams-BMW	1:10.258	1:11.131	+0.485	7
8	1	(Germany) Michael Schumacher	Ferrari	1:10.192	1:11.386	+0.740	18^{1}
9	8	(Spain) Fernando Alonso	Renault	1:10.637	1:11.454	+0.808	8
10	16	(Italy) Jarno Trulli	Toyota	1:10.478	1:11.483	+0.837	9
11	11	(Italy) Giancarlo Fisichella	Sauber-Petronas	1:10.467	1:11.571	+0.925	10
12	14	(Australia) Mark Webber	Jaguar-Cosworth	1:11.230	1:11.665	+1.019	11
13	5	(United Kingdom) David Coulthard	McLaren-Mercedes	1:10.418	1:11.750	+1.104	12
14	7	(Canada) Jacques Villeneuve	Renault	1:10.708	1:11.836	+1.190	13
15	17	(Brazil) Ricardo Zonta	Toyota	1:11.315	1:11.974	+1.328	14
16	15	(Austria) Christian Klien	Jaguar-Cosworth	1:11.912	1:12.211	+1.565	15
17	18	(Germany) Nick Heidfeld	Jordan-Ford	1:11.394	1:12.829	+2.183	16
18	19	(Germany) Timo Glock	Jordan-Ford	1:12.242	1:13.502	+2.856	17
19	21	(Hungary) Zsolt Baumgartner	Minardi-Cosworth	1:13.032	1:13.550	+2.904	19^{2}
20	20	(Italy) Gianmaria Bruni	Minardi-Cosworth	1:12.916	No time^{1}		20^{2}

Notes

- ^1 – Gianmaria Bruni did not get time in Q2 due to suspension problems.
- ^2 – Michael Schumacher, Zsolt Baumgartner and Gianmaria Bruni received a 10-place grid penalty for engine changes.

=== Race ===
Pos	No	Driver	Constructor	Tyre	Laps	Time/Retired	Grid	Points
1	3	(Colombia) Juan Pablo Montoya	Williams-BMW	M	71	1:28:01.451	2	10
2	6	(Finland) Kimi Räikkönen	McLaren-Mercedes	M	71	+1.022	3	8
3	2	(Brazil) Rubens Barrichello	Ferrari	B	71	+24.099	1	6
4	8	(Spain) Fernando Alonso	Renault	M	71	+48.508	8	5
5	4	(Germany) Ralf Schumacher	Williams-BMW	M	71	+49.740	7	4
6	10	(Japan) Takuma Sato	BAR-Honda	M	71	+50.248	6	3
7	1	(Germany) Michael Schumacher	Ferrari	B	71	+50.626	18	2
8	12	(Brazil) Felipe Massa	Sauber-Petronas	B	71	+1:02.310	4	1
9	11	(Italy) Giancarlo Fisichella	Sauber-Petronas	B	71	+1:03.842	10	
10	7	(Canada) Jacques Villeneuve	Renault	M	70	+1 Lap	13	
11	5	(United Kingdom) David Coulthard	McLaren-Mercedes	M	70	+1 Lap	12	
12	16	(Italy) Jarno Trulli	Toyota	M	70	+1 Lap	9	
13	17	(Brazil) Ricardo Zonta	Toyota	M	70	+1 Lap	14	
14	15	(Austria) Christian Klien	Jaguar-Cosworth	M	69	+2 Laps	15	
15	19	(Germany) Timo Glock	Jordan-Ford	B	69	+2 Laps	17	
16	21	(Hungary) Zsolt Baumgartner	Minardi-Cosworth	B	67	+4 Laps	PL^{3}	
17	20	(Italy) Gianmaria Bruni	Minardi-Cosworth	B	67	+4 Laps	PL^{3}	
Ret	14	(Australia) Mark Webber	Jaguar-Cosworth	M	23	Collision	11	
Ret	18	(Germany) Nick Heidfeld	Jordan-Ford	B	15	Clutch	16	
Ret	9	(United Kingdom) Jenson Button	BAR-Honda	M	3	Engine	5	

Notes

- ^3 – Zsolt Baumgartner and Gianmaria Bruni started the race from the pitlane.

== Championship standings after the race ==
- Bold text and an asterisk indicates the World Champions.

Drivers' Championship standings

Pos	Driver	Points
1	(Germany) Michael Schumacher*	148
2	(Brazil) Rubens Barrichello	114
3	(United Kingdom) Jenson Button	85
4	(Spain) Fernando Alonso	59
5	(Colombia) Juan Pablo Montoya	58

Constructors' Championship standings

Pos	Constructor	Points
1	(Italy) Ferrari*	262
2	(United Kingdom) BAR-Honda	119
3	(France) Renault	105
4	(United Kingdom) Williams-BMW	88
5	(United Kingdom) McLaren-Mercedes	69

- Note: Only the top five positions are included for both sets of standings.

== Footnotes ==
Previous race: 2004 Japanese Grand Prix	FIA Formula One World Championship; 2004 season	Next race: 2005 Australian Grand Prix
Previous race: 2003 Brazilian Grand Prix	Brazilian Grand Prix	Next race: 2005 Brazilian Grand Prix
