= 2004 Italian Grand Prix =

Coordinates: 45°36′56″N 9°16′52″E

Race 15 of 18 in the 2004 Formula One World Championship
← Previous race	Next race →
- Autodromo Nazionale di Monza

Race details
- Date: 12 September 2004
- Official name: Formula 1 Gran Premio Vodafone d'Italia 2004
- Location: Autodromo Nazionale di Monza, Monza, Italy
- Course: Permanent racing facility
- Course length: 5.793 km (3.600 miles)
- Distance: 53 laps, 306.720 km (190.587 miles)
- Weather: Wet track at the start, dry later on

Pole position
Driver	(Brazil) Rubens Barrichello	Ferrari
- Time: 1:20.089

Fastest lap
Driver	(Brazil) Rubens Barrichello	Ferrari
- Time: 1:21.046 on lap 41

Podium
First	(Brazil) Rubens Barrichello	Ferrari
Second	(Germany) Michael Schumacher	Ferrari
Third	(United Kingdom) Jenson Button	BAR-Honda

The 2004 Italian Grand Prix (officially the Formula 1 Gran Premio Vodafone d'Italia 2004) was a Formula One motor race held on 12 September 2004 at the Autodromo Nazionale di Monza. It was Race 15 of 18 in the 2004 FIA Formula One World Championship.

== Friday drivers ==
The bottom 6 teams in the 2003 Constructors' Championship were entitled to run a third car in free practice on Friday. These drivers drove on Friday but did not compete in qualifying or the race.

Constructor	Nat	Driver
BAR-Honda	(United Kingdom)	Anthony Davidson
Sauber-Petronas		-
Jaguar-Cosworth	(Sweden)	Björn Wirdheim
Toyota	(Australia)	Ryan Briscoe
Jordan-Ford	(Germany)	Timo Glock
Minardi-Cosworth	(Belgium)	Bas Leinders

== Report ==
=== Background ===
After the Belgian Grand Prix, Michael Schumacher was already crowned driver world champion. He led the drivers' championship unassailably with 40 points ahead of Rubens Barrichello and 63 points ahead of Jenson Button. After the Hungarian Grand Prix, Ferrari was confirmed as constructors' world champion. They held an unassailable lead in the constructors' championship with 125 points ahead of Renault and 131 points ahead of BAR-Honda.

This race was Scuderia Ferrari's 700th start in a World Championship event as a team. This was the last race for Giorgio Pantano.

=== Qualifying ===
In the first qualifying, in which the starting positions for the second qualifying were determined, Montoya achieved the fastest time. Barrichello was fastest in qualifying and secured pole position with a time of 1:20.089 minutes. Montoya came second ahead of Michael Schumacher.

In the first part of qualifying (which did not count towards grid positions), Montoya lapped Monza in his Williams FW26 at an average speed of 262.242 km/h (162.950 mph), which at the time, was the fastest lap recorded at Monza, and the highest average speed over one lap in Formula One. These records would stand until the 2018 edition.

=== Race ===
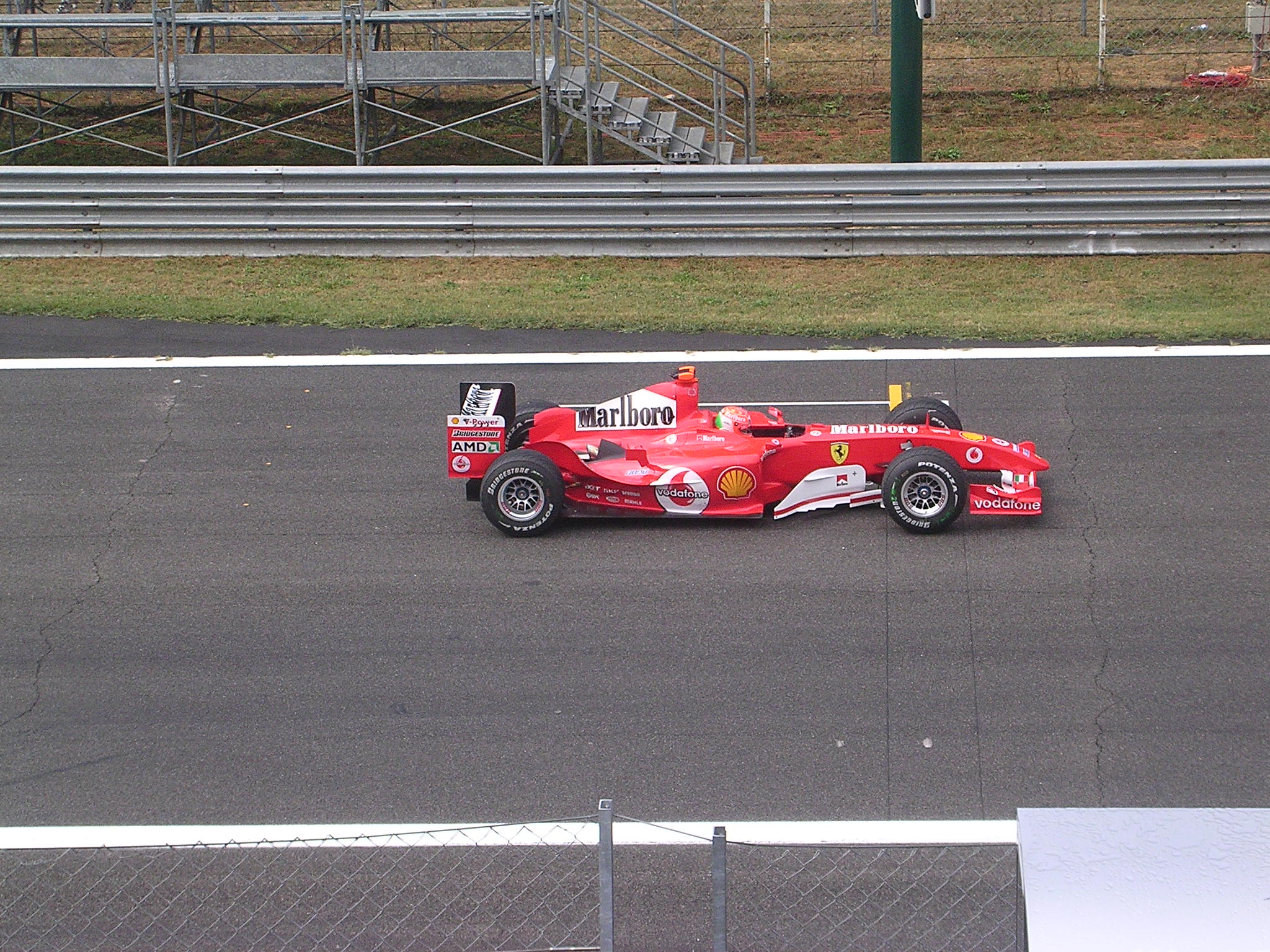
Michael Schumacher finished second, driving for Ferrari.

The morning of the race was quite rainy and at the time of departure there were still wet parts of the circuit, which made tire selection difficult. At the beginning of the race, Alonso overtakes Barrichello; while Schumacher drops to 15th position after an incident. However, against all odds, Barrichello manages to regain third position after stopping on lap 5 to put on dry tires and Barrichello climbs back into first place.

In the Minardi pit garage, the car of Gianmaria Bruni caught fire after fuel escaped from the hose onto the hot bodywork during a routine pit-stop, and it was put out without any serious injury. Bruni inhaled some of the extinguishant and was having trouble breathing and so the team decided to retire the car.

Montoya's teammate Antônio Pizzonia reached a top speed of 369.9 km/h (229.8 mph), the fastest speed recorded in Formula One at the time (it was to be exceeded by Montoya at the 2005 edition).

Ferrari took a 1–2 in front of the delighted Tifosi, with Rubens Barrichello ahead of teammate Michael Schumacher.

== Classification ==
=== Qualifying ===
Pos	No	Driver	Constructor	Q1 Time	Q2 Time	Gap	Grid
1	2	(Brazil) Rubens Barrichello	Ferrari	1:20.552	1:20.089	—	1
2	3	(Colombia) Juan Pablo Montoya	Williams-BMW	1:19.525	1:20.620	+0.531	2
3	1	(Germany) Michael Schumacher	Ferrari	1:20.528	1:20.637	+0.548	3
4	8	(Spain) Fernando Alonso	Renault	1:20.341	1:20.645	+0.556	4
5	10	(Japan) Takuma Sato	BAR-Honda	1:19.733	1:20.715	+0.626	5
6	9	(United Kingdom) Jenson Button	BAR-Honda	1:19.856	1:20.786	+0.697	6
7	6	(Finland) Kimi Räikkönen	McLaren-Mercedes	1:20.501	1:20.877	+0.788	7
8	4	(Brazil) Antônio Pizzonia	Williams-BMW	1:19.671	1:20.888	+0.799	8
9	7	(Italy) Jarno Trulli	Renault	1:21.011	1:21.027	+0.938	9
10	5	(United Kingdom) David Coulthard	McLaren-Mercedes	1:20.414	1:21.049	+0.960	10
11	16	(Brazil) Ricardo Zonta	Toyota	1:21.829	1:21.520	+1.431	11
12	14	(Australia) Mark Webber	Jaguar-Cosworth	1:21.783	1:21.602	+1.513	12
13	17	(France) Olivier Panis	Toyota	1:22.169	1:21.841	+1.752	13
14	15	(Austria) Christian Klien	Jaguar-Cosworth	1:22.114	1:21.989	+1.900	14
15	11	(Italy) Giancarlo Fisichella	Sauber-Petronas	1:20.357	1:22.239	+2.150	15
16	12	(Brazil) Felipe Massa	Sauber-Petronas	1:20.571	1:22.287	+2.198	16
17	18	(Germany) Nick Heidfeld	Jordan-Ford	No time^{1}	1:22.301	+2.212	20^{2}
18	19	(Italy) Giorgio Pantano	Jordan-Ford	1:23.264	1:23.239	+3.150	17
19	21	(Hungary) Zsolt Baumgartner	Minardi-Cosworth	1:25.082	1:25.808^{3}	+4.719	19
20	20	(Italy) Gianmaria Bruni	Minardi-Cosworth	1:23.963	1:24.910	+4.821	18

Notes

- ^1 – Nick Heidfeld did not get time in Q1 due to gearbox problems.
- ^2 – Nick Heidfeld received a 10-place grid penalty for an engine change.
- ^3 – Zsolt Baumgartner initially set a lap time in Q2 (1:24.808), but received a one-second time penalty for cutting the first chicane on his flying lap.

=== Race ===
Pos	No	Driver	Constructor	Tyre	Laps	Time/Retired	Grid	Points
1	2	(Brazil) Rubens Barrichello	Ferrari	B	53	1:15:18.448	1	10
2	1	(Germany) Michael Schumacher	Ferrari	B	53	+1.347	3	8
3	9	(United Kingdom) Jenson Button	BAR-Honda	M	53	+10.197	6	6
4	10	(Japan) Takuma Sato	BAR-Honda	M	53	+15.370	5	5
5	3	(Colombia) Juan Pablo Montoya	Williams-BMW	M	53	+32.352	2	4
6	5	(United Kingdom) David Coulthard	McLaren-Mercedes	M	53	+33.439	PL^{4}	3
7	4	(Brazil) Antônio Pizzonia	Williams-BMW	M	53	+33.752	8	2
8	11	(Italy) Giancarlo Fisichella	Sauber-Petronas	B	53	+35.431	15	1
9	14	(Australia) Mark Webber	Jaguar-Cosworth	M	53	+56.761	12	
10	7	(Italy) Jarno Trulli	Renault	M	53	+1:06.316	9	
11	16	(Brazil) Ricardo Zonta	Toyota	M	53	+1:22.531	11	
12	12	(Brazil) Felipe Massa	Sauber-Petronas	B	52	+1 Lap	16	
13	15	(Austria) Christian Klien	Jaguar-Cosworth	M	52	+1 Lap	14	
14	18	(Germany) Nick Heidfeld	Jordan-Ford	B	52	+1 Lap	PL^{4}	
15	21	(Hungary) Zsolt Baumgartner	Minardi-Cosworth	B	50	+3 Laps	19	
Ret	8	(Spain) Fernando Alonso	Renault	M	40	Spun off	4	
Ret	19	(Italy) Giorgio Pantano	Jordan-Ford	B	33	Accident	17	
Ret	20	(Italy) Gianmaria Bruni	Minardi-Cosworth	B	29	Fire	18	
Ret	6	(Finland) Kimi Räikkönen	McLaren-Mercedes	M	13	Overheating	7	
Ret	17	(France) Olivier Panis	Toyota	M	0	Spun off	13	

Notes

- ^4 – David Coulthard and Nick Heidfeld started the race from the pitlane.

== Championship standings after the race ==
- Bold text and an asterisk indicates the World Champions.

Drivers' Championship standings

Pos	Driver	Points
1	(Germany) Michael Schumacher*	136
2	(Brazil) Rubens Barrichello	98
3	(United Kingdom) Jenson Button	71
4	(Italy) Jarno Trulli	46
5	(Spain) Fernando Alonso	45

Constructors' Championship standings

	Pos	Constructor	Points
	1	(Italy) Ferrari*	234
1	2	(United Kingdom) BAR-Honda	94
1	3	(France) Renault	91
	4	(United Kingdom) Williams-BMW	60
	5	(United Kingdom) McLaren-Mercedes	52

- Note: Only the top five positions are included for both sets of standings.

== See also ==
- 2004 Monza F3000 round

== Footnotes ==
Previous race: 2004 Belgian Grand Prix	FIA Formula One World Championship; 2004 season	Next race: 2004 Chinese Grand Prix
Previous race: 2003 Italian Grand Prix	Italian Grand Prix	Next race: 2005 Italian Grand Prix
