= 2004 Hungarian Grand Prix =

Coordinates: 47°34′44″N 19°14′55″E

Race 13 of 18 in the 2004 Formula One World Championship
← Previous race	Next race →
- The Hungaroring after being modified in 2003.

Race details
- Date: 15 August 2004
- Official name: Formula 1 Marlboro Magyar Nagydíj 2004
- Location: Hungaroring, Mogyoród, Pest, Hungary
- Course: Permanent racing facility
- Course length: 4.381 km (2.722 miles)
- Distance: 70 laps, 306.663 km (190.552 miles)
- Weather: Warm, dry and sunny, Air: 26 °C (79 °F), Track 42 °C (108 °F)

Pole position
Driver	(Germany) Michael Schumacher	Ferrari
- Time: 1:19.146

Fastest lap
Driver	(Germany) Michael Schumacher	Ferrari
- Time: 1:19.071 on lap 29

Podium
First	(Germany) Michael Schumacher	Ferrari
Second	(Brazil) Rubens Barrichello	Ferrari
Third	(Spain) Fernando Alonso	Renault

The 2004 Hungarian Grand Prix (officially known as the Formula 1 Marlboro Magyar Nagydíj 2004) was a Formula One motor race that took place on 15 August 2004 at the Hungaroring, Mogyoród, Pest, Hungary. It was the thirteenth round of the 2004 FIA Formula One World Championship.

Michael Schumacher of Scuderia Ferrari took pole position for the race and went on to take the race win ahead of teammate Rubens Barrichello and Fernando Alonso of Renault. It was Schumacher's twelfth win of the season and his seventh in succession, equalling Alberto Ascari's record. Ferrari's one-two finish meant that they secured their sixth consecutive Constructors' Championship.

== Background ==
Across the weekend of 13–15 August, the Hungaroring in Mogyoród hosted a Formula One Grand Prix for the nineteenth time in the circuit's history, with it being the nineteenth Hungarian Grand Prix as a round of the Formula One World Championship as well. It was the thirteenth round of the 2004 Formula One World Championship.

=== Championship standings before the race ===
Going into the weekend, Michael Schumacher led the Drivers' Championship with 110 points, ahead of Scuderia Ferrari teammate Rubens Barrichello on 74 points and BAR's Jenson Button on 65. Ferrari were leading the Constructors' Championship with 184 points, from Renault (85 points) and BAR (76).

=== Driver changes ===
Cristiano da Matta was dropped by the Toyota team because of his poor performance relative to teammate Olivier Panis. He was replaced by the team's third driver Ricardo Zonta but would stay on to perform marketing work while Toyota test driver Ryan Briscoe assumed Zonta's former position.

== Practice ==
Four free practice sessions were held for the event. The first session on Friday was topped by the Ferraris of Michael Schumacher and Rubens Barrichello, ahead of Anthony Davidson, third driver for BAR. McLaren's Kimi Räikkönen set the fastest time in the second session, ahead of Michael Schumacher and Juan Pablo Montoya of Williams.

On Saturday, Schumacher again set the quickest time in the third practice session, ahead of Williams drivers Antônio Pizzonia and Montoya. Finally, Jenson Button was fastest in the fourth session in his BAR, ahead of Schumacher and Barrichello.

=== Friday drivers ===
The bottom 6 teams in the 2003 Constructors' Championship were entitled to run a third car in free practice on Friday. These drivers drove on Friday but did not compete in qualifying or the race.

Constructor	Nat	Driver
BAR-Honda	(United Kingdom)	Anthony Davidson
Sauber-Petronas		-
Jaguar-Cosworth	(Sweden)	Björn Wirdheim
Toyota	(Australia)	Ryan Briscoe
Jordan-Ford	(Germany)	Timo Glock
Minardi-Cosworth	(Belgium)	Bas Leinders

== Qualifying ==
Qualifying on Saturday consisted of two sessions. In the first session, drivers went out one by one in the order in which they classified at the previous race. Each driver was allowed to set one lap time. The result determined the running order in the second session: the fastest driver in the first session was allowed to go last in the second session, which usually provided the benefit of a cleaner track. In the second session, drivers were again allowed to set one lap time, which determined the order on the grid for the race on Sunday, with the fastest driver scoring pole position.

Despite lower track temperatures and a few drops of the rain, the front of the field saw little surprises. Michael Schumacher scored his seventh pole position of the season and the 62nd of his career, ahead of Ferrari teammate Rubens Barrichello and over half a second ahead of the BARs of Takuma Sato and Jenson Button.

Pos	No	Driver	Constructor	Q1 Time	Q2 Time	Gap	Grid
1	1	(Germany) Michael Schumacher	Ferrari	1:19.107	1:19.146	—	1
2	2	(Brazil) Rubens Barrichello	Ferrari	1:18.436	1:19.323	+0.177	2
3	10	(Japan) Takuma Sato	BAR-Honda	1:19.695	1:19.693	+0.547	3
4	9	(United Kingdom) Jenson Button	BAR-Honda	1:19.878	1:19.700	+0.554	4
5	8	(Spain) Fernando Alonso	Renault	1:20.135	1:19.996	+0.850	5
6	4	(Brazil) Antônio Pizzonia	Williams-BMW	1:20.019	1:20.170	+1.024	6
7	3	(Colombia) Juan Pablo Montoya	Williams-BMW	1:19.821	1:20.199	+1.053	7
8	11	(Italy) Giancarlo Fisichella	Sauber-Petronas	1:19.668	1:20.324	+1.178	8
9	7	(Italy) Jarno Trulli	Renault	1:19.879	1:20.411	+1.265	9
10	6	(Finland) Kimi Räikkönen	McLaren-Mercedes	1:20.066	1:20.570	+1.424	10
11	14	(Australia) Mark Webber	Jaguar-Cosworth	1:21.452	1:20.730	+1.584	11
12	5	(United Kingdom) David Coulthard	McLaren-Mercedes	1:21.192	1:20.897	+1.751	12
13	17	(France) Olivier Panis	Toyota	1:20.491	1:21.068	+1.922	13
14	15	(Austria) Christian Klien	Jaguar-Cosworth	1:21.510	1:21.118	+1.972	14
15	16	(Brazil) Ricardo Zonta	Toyota	1:20.199	1:21.135	+1.989	15
16	18	(Germany) Nick Heidfeld	Jordan-Ford	1:20.439	1:22.180	+3.034	16
17	19	(Italy) Giorgio Pantano	Jordan-Ford	1:21.187	1:22.356	+3.210	17
18	21	(Hungary) Zsolt Baumgartner	Minardi-Cosworth	1:24.656	1:24.329	+5.183	18
19	20	(Italy) Gianmaria Bruni	Minardi-Cosworth	1:23.362	1:24.679	+5.533	19
20	12	(Brazil) Felipe Massa	Sauber-Petronas	1:19.658	No time^{1}		20^{2}

Notes

- ^1 – Multiple engine issues during practice, Sauber decided to save the Petronas engine and abort Massa's effort in the second qualifying session.
- ^2 – Felipe Massa received a 10-place grid penalty for an engine change.

== Race ==
=== Race report ===
At the start, Michael Schumacher comfortably kept his lead, while second-starting Rubens Barrichello was under pressure from Fernando Alonso, who had jumped up from fifth position. Both BARs had a slow getaway: Takuma Sato fell down to eighth, Jenson Button to fifth behind Juan Pablo Montoya. Ricardo Zonta's first race for Toyota got off to a rocky start: he was pushed by one of the Jordans and could not avoid hitting the back of Mark Webber's Jaguar. Zonta spun and rejoined in last place. He would later retire from the race.

The Hungaroring's configuration had been altered over the winter, the organisers hoping to create more overtaking opportunities, but the layout still caused the field to spread out and there were very little overtakes. On lap 14, Kimi Räikkönen retired due to mechanical problems for the eighth time this season and on lap 43, the engine on Jarno Trulli's Renault failed. There were no other changes in the points-scoring positions for the remainder of the race. Button pressured Montoya for fourth place but never came closer than three seconds behind. Their respective teammates were fighting over sixth place but never went wheel-to-wheel.

Schumacher scored a dominant victory over Barrichello and Alonso. The German only needed to score two more points than Barrichello to clinch a record-breaking seventh World Championship. The 1-2 finish was enough for Scuderia Ferrari to clinch their sixth consecutive Constructors' Championship.

=== Race classification ===
Pos	No	Driver	Constructor	Tyre	Laps	Time/Retired	Grid	Points
1	1	(Germany) Michael Schumacher	Ferrari	B	70	1:35:26.131	1	10
2	2	(Brazil) Rubens Barrichello	Ferrari	B	70	+ 4.696	2	8
3	8	(Spain) Fernando Alonso	Renault	M	70	+ 44.599	5	6
4	3	(Colombia) Juan Pablo Montoya	Williams-BMW	M	70	+ 1:02.613	7	5
5	9	(United Kingdom) Jenson Button	BAR-Honda	M	70	+ 1:07.439	4	4
6	10	(Japan) Takuma Sato	BAR-Honda	M	69	+ 1 Lap	3	3
7	4	(Brazil) Antônio Pizzonia	Williams-BMW	M	69	+ 1 Lap	6	2
8	11	(Italy) Giancarlo Fisichella	Sauber-Petronas	B	69	+ 1 Lap	8	1
9	5	(United Kingdom) David Coulthard	McLaren-Mercedes	M	69	+ 1 Lap	12	
10	14	(Australia) Mark Webber	Jaguar-Cosworth	M	69	+ 1 Lap	11	
11	17	(France) Olivier Panis	Toyota	M	69	+ 1 Lap	13	
12	18	(Germany) Nick Heidfeld	Jordan-Ford	B	68	+ 2 Laps	16	
13	15	(Austria) Christian Klien	Jaguar-Cosworth	M	68	+ 2 Laps	14	
14	20	(Italy) Gianmaria Bruni	Minardi-Cosworth	B	66	+ 4 Laps	19	
15	21	(Hungary) Zsolt Baumgartner	Minardi-Cosworth	B	65	+ 5 Laps	18	
Ret	19	(Italy) Giorgio Pantano	Jordan-Ford	B	48	Gearbox	17	
Ret	7	(Italy) Jarno Trulli	Renault	M	41	Engine	9	
Ret	16	(Brazil) Ricardo Zonta	Toyota	M	31	Electronics	15	
Ret	12	(Brazil) Felipe Massa	Sauber-Petronas	B	21	Brakes	20	
Ret	6	(Finland) Kimi Räikkönen	McLaren-Mercedes	M	13	Electrical	10	

== Championship standings after the race ==
- Bold text and an asterisk indicates the World Champions.

Drivers' Championship standings

Pos	Driver	Points
1	(Germany) Michael Schumacher	120
2	(Brazil) Rubens Barrichello	82
3	(United Kingdom) Jenson Button	65
4	(Italy) Jarno Trulli	46
5	(Spain) Fernando Alonso	45

Constructors' Championship standings

Pos	Constructor	Points
1	(Italy) Ferrari*	202
2	(France) Renault	91
3	(United Kingdom) BAR-Honda	83
4	(United Kingdom) Williams-BMW	54
5	(United Kingdom) McLaren-Mercedes	37

- Note: Only the top five positions are included for both sets of standings.

== See also ==
- 2004 Hungaroring F3000 round

Previous race: 2004 German Grand Prix	FIA Formula One World Championship; 2004 season	Next race: 2004 Belgian Grand Prix
Previous race: 2003 Hungarian Grand Prix	Hungarian Grand Prix	Next race: 2005 Hungarian Grand Prix
