= 2004 Japanese Grand Prix =

Coordinates: 34°50′35″N 136°32′26″E

Race 17 of 18 in the 2004 Formula One World Championship
← Previous race	Next race →
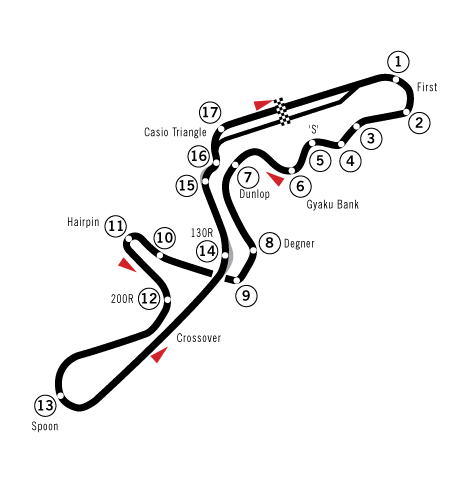

Race details
- Date: 10 October 2004
- Official name: 2004 Formula 1 Fuji Television Japanese Grand Prix
- Location: Suzuka Circuit, Suzuka, Mie, Japan
- Course: Permanent racing facility
- Course length: 5.807 km (3.608 miles)
- Distance: 53 laps, 307.573 km (191.117 miles)
- Weather: Sunny
- Attendance: 204,000

Pole position
Driver	(Germany) Michael Schumacher	Ferrari
- Time: 1:33.542

Fastest lap
Driver	(Brazil) Rubens Barrichello	Ferrari
- Time: 1:32.730 on lap 30

Podium
First	(Germany) Michael Schumacher	Ferrari
Second	(Germany) Ralf Schumacher	Williams-BMW
Third	(United Kingdom) Jenson Button	BAR-Honda

The 2004 Japanese Grand Prix (officially the 2004 Formula 1 Fuji Television Japanese Grand Prix) was a Formula One motor race held on 10 October 2004 at the Suzuka Circuit. It was Race 17 of 18 in the 2004 FIA Formula One World Championship.

== Friday drivers ==
The bottom 6 teams in the 2003 Constructors' Championship were entitled to run a third car in free practice on Friday. These drivers drove on Friday but did not compete in qualifying or the race.

Wirdheim and Briscoe could not got to drive any single lap Friday training sessions. Teams confirmed it as a reason for not driving the drivers that they had a limited number of tyres for very wet weather, and were therefore not sufficient for the cars of the third drivers.

Constructor	No	Driver
BAR-Honda	35	(United Kingdom) Anthony Davidson
Sauber-Petronas		-
Jaguar-Cosworth	37	(Sweden) Björn Wirdheim
Toyota	38	(Australia) Ryan Briscoe
Jordan-Ford	39	(Netherlands) Robert Doornbos
Minardi-Cosworth	40	(Belgium) Bas Leinders

== Report ==
=== Background ===
This was Jarno Trulli's first race with the Toyota team after missing the previous race. This was Olivier Panis's last race as he decided to retire from the race seat. But he stayed with the Toyota team, as the test driver.

=== Qualifying ===
All the running on Saturday was cancelled due to Typhoon Ma-on, meaning that both the qualifying sessions were run on Sunday morning. Qualifying took place on a track that was still damp but is drying out; Michael Schumacher took advantage of this and, taking to the track among the last thanks to an excellent performance in the first session, won pole position, with a large advantage over his rivals. Second was Ralf Schumacher, while Webber surprisingly took third place, still a full second behind the pole position time. The two BARs of Sato and Button followed, preceding Trulli, Fisichella, Coulthard and Villeneuve. The difficult conditions of the track put several drivers in difficulty: Alonso, Räikkönen, Montoya and Barrichello made mistakes, relegated to the second half of the grid.

=== Race ===
After some testing plagued by bad weather, the race started in dry conditions and sunshine. At the start, Michael and Ralf Schumacher had no difficulty maintaining the lead. Webber on the other hand, started poorly and was overtaken by Button, Sato and Trulli. Michael Schumacher immediately gained a clear advantage over his opponents. The only one who drove a similar pace was his brother Ralf, who also went into the pits first on the 9th lap. When Michael Schumacher refueled four laps later, he rejoined the track as the leader, ahead of Button (who started with a two-stop strategy and therefore had not yet pitted). The race for first place was practically over. While the BAR duo fought for third place (Sato with a three-stop strategy against Button's), the race is livened up by the comeback of Barrichello, Montoya, Räikkönen and Alonso; Trulli, however, is relegated and, having started with little petrol on board, has to deal with a Toyota that is very difficult to manage with a full tank of fuel.

On lap 20, Webber retired for a rather unusual reason: the cockpit of his Jaguar inexplicably overheated to such an extent that the Australian driver suffered minor burns on his thigh. After the first series of stops, Trulli, Montoya, Barrichello and Fisichella gave rise to an intense duel, with the Sauber driver having difficulty with the tyres, having to give way to the Brazilian from Ferrari, but managing to defend himself from the other two until his second refueling, on the 24th lap. Michael Schumacher continued to lead undisturbed and didn't relinquish the lead for one lap. His brother Ralf also had no particular difficulties defending his second place from the two BAR drivers. Coulthard climbs sharply up the overall standings and initially only makes two stops. With around twenty laps to go, the Scot was in fifth place, having refueled for the second time.

Behind him, however, Barrichello quickly recovered. On lap 38, the Brazilian attempted an attack, but the McLaren driver came out of the corner and the two subsequently touched each other. The two cars were damaged beyond repair and both had to give up. Alonso moved up to fifth place. Meanwhile, Button prevailed against his teammate in the duel for the podium. Sato got off to a slow start and pain from an old shoulder injury returned during the race and had to go without liquid for much of the race when a water bottle stopped working. BAR virtually secured second place in the Constructors' Championship. The team increased its advantage over Renault to 16 points with one race remaining.

There were no more surprises in the final laps and Michael Schumacher won ahead of Ralf Schumacher, Button, Sato, Alonso, Räikkönen, Montoya and Fisichella. It was Ferrari's fifteenth victory of the season. In doing so, they equaled the previous record of the McLaren, which won fifteen out of sixteen Grands Prix victories in 1988, and the Ferrari, which won fifteen out of seventeen in 2002.

It was the last time the Schumacher brothers finished in 1–2 formation (having done so on four other occasions: 2001 Canadian Grand Prix, 2001 French Grand Prix, 2002 Brazilian Grand Prix, 2003 Canadian Grand Prix). It was also the last 1-2 finish between German drivers until the 2013 Indian Grand Prix.

== Classification ==
=== Qualifying ===
Qualifying was held on Sunday morning due to weather conditions on Saturday.

Pos	No	Driver	Constructor	Q1 Time	Q2 Time	Gap	Grid
1	1	(Germany) Michael Schumacher	Ferrari	1:38.397	1:33.542	—	1
2	4	(Germany) Ralf Schumacher	Williams-BMW	1:38.864	1:34.032	+0.490	2
3	14	(Australia) Mark Webber	Jaguar-Cosworth	1:39.170	1:34.571	+1.029	3
4	10	(Japan) Takuma Sato	BAR-Honda	1:40.135	1:34.897	+1.355	4
5	9	(United Kingdom) Jenson Button	BAR-Honda	1:41.423	1:35.157	+1.615	5
6	16	(Italy) Jarno Trulli	Toyota	1:37.716	1:35.213	+1.671	6
7	11	(Italy) Giancarlo Fisichella	Sauber-Petronas	1:40.151	1:36.136	+2.594	7
8	5	(United Kingdom) David Coulthard	McLaren-Mercedes	1:41.126	1:36.156	+2.614	8
9	7	(Canada) Jacques Villeneuve	Renault	1:41.857	1:36.274	+2.732	9
10	17	(France) Olivier Panis	Toyota	1:40.029	1:36.420	+2.878	10
11	8	(Spain) Fernando Alonso	Renault	1:42.056	1:36.663	+3.121	11
12	6	(Finland) Kimi Räikkönen	McLaren-Mercedes	1:41.517	1:36.820	+3.278	12
13	3	(Colombia) Juan Pablo Montoya	Williams-BMW	1:44.370	1:37.653	+4.111	13
14	15	(Austria) Christian Klien	Jaguar-Cosworth	1:42.054	1:38.258	+4.716	14
15	2	(Brazil) Rubens Barrichello	Ferrari	1:41.001	1:38.637	+5.095	15
16	18	(Germany) Nick Heidfeld	Jordan-Ford	1:42.434	1:41.953	+8.411	16
17	19	(Germany) Timo Glock	Jordan-Ford	1:43.682	1:43.533	+9.991	17
18	20	(Italy) Gianmaria Bruni	Minardi-Cosworth	1:45.415	1:48.069	+14.527	18
19	12	(Brazil) Felipe Massa	Sauber-Petronas	1:41.707	No time^{1}		19
20	21	(Hungary) Zsolt Baumgartner	Minardi-Cosworth	No time^{2}	No time^{3}		20^{4}

Notes

- ^1 – Felipe Massa did not get a time in Q2 after spinning off the track.
- ^2 – Zsolt Baumgartner did not get a time in Q1 after spinning off the track at turn 9.
- ^3 – Zsolt Baumgartner did not get a time in Q2 after driving off the track in Q1.
- ^4 – Zsolt Baumgartner received a 10-place grid penalty for an engine change.

=== Race ===
Pos	No	Driver	Constructor	Tyre	Laps	Time/Retired	Grid	Points
1	1	(Germany) Michael Schumacher	Ferrari	B	53	1:24:26.985	1	10
2	4	(Germany) Ralf Schumacher	Williams-BMW	M	53	+14.098	2	8
3	9	(United Kingdom) Jenson Button	BAR-Honda	M	53	+19.662	5	6
4	10	(Japan) Takuma Sato	BAR-Honda	M	53	+31.781	4	5
5	8	(Spain) Fernando Alonso	Renault	M	53	+37.767	11	4
6	6	(Finland) Kimi Räikkönen	McLaren-Mercedes	M	53	+39.362	12	3
7	3	(Colombia) Juan Pablo Montoya	Williams-BMW	M	53	+55.347	13	2
8	11	(Italy) Giancarlo Fisichella	Sauber-Petronas	B	53	+56.276	7	1
9	12	(Brazil) Felipe Massa	Sauber-Petronas	B	53	+1:29.656	19	
10	7	(Canada) Jacques Villeneuve	Renault	M	52	+1 Lap	9	
11	16	(Italy) Jarno Trulli	Toyota	M	52	+1 Lap	6	
12	15	(Austria) Christian Klien	Jaguar-Cosworth	M	52	+1 Lap	14	
13	18	(Germany) Nick Heidfeld	Jordan-Ford	B	52	+1 Lap	16	
14	17	(France) Olivier Panis	Toyota	M	51	+2 Laps	10	
15	19	(Germany) Timo Glock	Jordan-Ford	B	51	+2 Laps	17	
16	20	(Italy) Gianmaria Bruni	Minardi-Cosworth	B	50	+3 Laps	18	
Ret	21	(Hungary) Zsolt Baumgartner	Minardi-Cosworth	B	41	Spin	PL^{4}	
Ret	5	(United Kingdom) David Coulthard	McLaren-Mercedes	M	38	Collision	8	
Ret	2	(Brazil) Rubens Barrichello	Ferrari	B	38	Collision	15	
Ret	14	(Australia) Mark Webber	Jaguar-Cosworth	M	20	Overheating	3	

Notes

- ^5 – Zsolt Baumgartner started the race from the pitlane.

== Championship standings after the race ==
- Bold text and an asterisk indicates the World Champions.

Drivers' Championship standings

	Pos	Driver	Points
	1	(Germany) Michael Schumacher*	146
	2	(Brazil) Rubens Barrichello	108
	3	(United Kingdom) Jenson Button	85
	4	(Spain) Fernando Alonso	54
1	5	(Colombia) Juan Pablo Montoya	48

Constructors' Championship standings

Pos	Constructor	Points
1	(Italy) Ferrari*	254
2	(United Kingdom) BAR-Honda	116
3	(France) Renault	100
4	(United Kingdom) Williams-BMW	74
5	(United Kingdom) McLaren-Mercedes	61

- Note: Only the top five positions are included for both sets of standings.

Previous race: 2004 Chinese Grand Prix	FIA Formula One World Championship; 2004 season	Next race: 2004 Brazilian Grand Prix
Previous race: 2003 Japanese Grand Prix	Japanese Grand Prix	Next race: 2005 Japanese Grand Prix
