= 2004 Belgian Grand Prix =

Coordinates: 50°26′14″N 5°58′17″E

Race 14 of 18 in the 2004 Formula One World Championship
← Previous race	Next race →
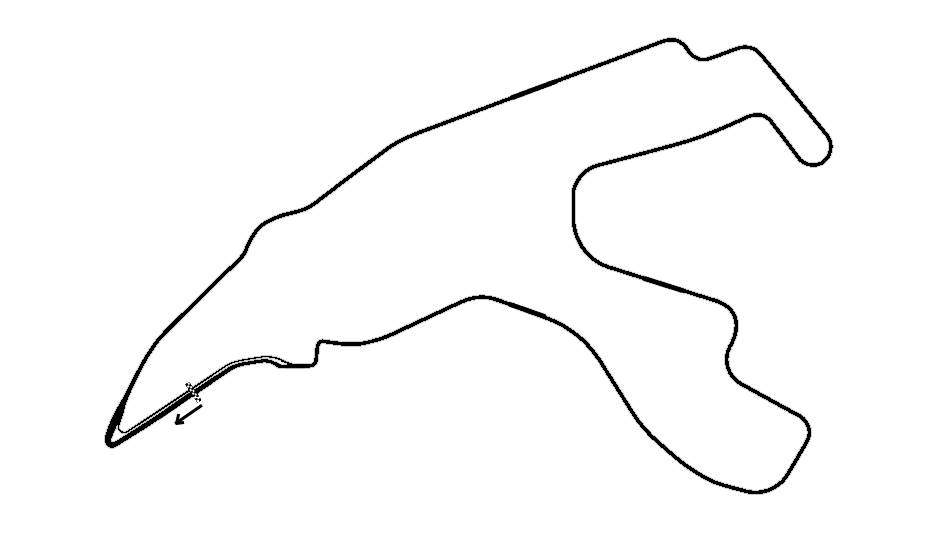

Race details
- Date: 29 August 2004
- Official name: Formula 1 Belgian Grand Prix 2004
- Location: Circuit de Spa-Francorchamps, Francorchamps, Wallonia, Belgium
- Course: Permanent racing facility
- Course length: 6.976 km (4.335 miles)
- Distance: 44 laps, 306.927 km (190.716 miles)
- Weather: Dry with temperatures reaching up to 15 °C (59 °F)

Pole position
Driver	(Italy) Jarno Trulli	Renault
- Time: 1:56.232

Fastest lap
Driver	(Finland) Kimi Räikkönen	McLaren-Mercedes
- Time: 1:45.108 on lap 42 (lap record)

Podium
First	(Finland) Kimi Räikkönen	McLaren-Mercedes
Second	(Germany) Michael Schumacher	Ferrari
Third	(Brazil) Rubens Barrichello	Ferrari

The 2004 Belgian Grand Prix (formally the Formula 1 Belgian Grand Prix 2004) was a Formula One motor race held on 29 August 2004, at the Circuit de Spa-Francorchamps, near the village of Francorchamps, Wallonia, Belgium. It was Race 14 of 18 in the 2004 FIA Formula One World Championship.

The race was contested over 44 laps and was won by Kimi Räikkönen, taking his and McLaren's only race win of the season from tenth place on the grid. Second place went to Michael Schumacher, who won his seventh and final world championship, after beating third-placed Rubens Barrichello.

Jarno Trulli started from pole position alongside Schumacher. The race saw many changes of the lead, but following several fortuitous safety cars, Räikkönen was leading the race for the final few laps. Mark Webber triggered a pile-up at the start, eliminating four cars and damaging several others, although he did admit his mistake later. The race saw Christian Klien score his first championship points, and Olivier Panis and the Jaguar team their last.

== Report ==
=== Background ===
Heading into the 14th race of the season, Michael Schumacher, driving for the Ferrari team, was leading the Drivers' Championship by 38 points from teammate Rubens Barrichello. Jenson Button, driving for BAR, was in third place, but only Schumacher and Barrichello could mathematically win the championship. Ferrari had sealed the Constructors' Championship at the previous race, but the battle for second in the Championship, between Renault and BAR, was still fierce.

However, the biggest story was the controversy surrounding Button's drive for 2005. Ten days before the Hungarian Grand Prix, Button chose to leave BAR and signed a two-year contract to return to Williams. This was surprising, as Button was enjoying his best season to date, while Williams had been struggling. BAR, however, insisted they had the right to exercise their option to keep Button. Button's management argued that the BAR option was not valid because it contained a clause allowing him to leave if BAR risked losing their Honda engines. They felt the new contract signed in the summer for Honda to supply engines to BAR was not definitive, and thus Button was free to move.

With regard to the Spa circuit itself, the race did not take place in 2003 so that modifications to the Bus Stop chicane could be completed. Pundits were very critical of the changes to the chicane: namely, a sweeping right-hand bend has been introduced just before it. This left a huge piece of green-coloured tarmac, causing Martin Brundle to be very scathing of it during qualifying, stating "you could hold an entire kart meeting in there, including transporters and trucks!"

=== Friday drivers ===
The bottom 6 teams in the 2003 Constructors' Championship were entitled to run a third car in free practice on Friday. These drivers drove on Friday but did not compete in qualifying or the race.

Constructor	Nat	Driver
BAR-Honda	(United Kingdom)	Anthony Davidson
Sauber-Petronas		-
Jaguar-Cosworth	(Sweden)	Björn Wirdheim
Toyota	(Australia)	Ryan Briscoe
Jordan-Ford	(Germany)	Timo Glock
Minardi-Cosworth	(Belgium)	Bas Leinders

=== Practice ===
Four practice sessions were held before qualifying – two 60-minute sessions on Friday, 27 August, and two 45-minute sessions on Saturday, 28 August. All teams, with the exception of Ferrari, Williams, McLaren, and Renault, were permitted to run three drivers on Friday. Anthony Davidson, the third driver for BAR, set the quickest time in the first practice session, 1:45.104. Räikkönen set the fastest time in practice two. Saturday practice one was cancelled due to fog, and Barrichello set the quickest time in Saturday practice two, shortened from 45 to 30 minutes as a result of the fog that had cancelled practice one. Saturday's second practice session saw two major excursions from Antônio Pizzonia and Gianmaria Bruni, the latter causing the session to be red-flagged.

=== Qualifying ===
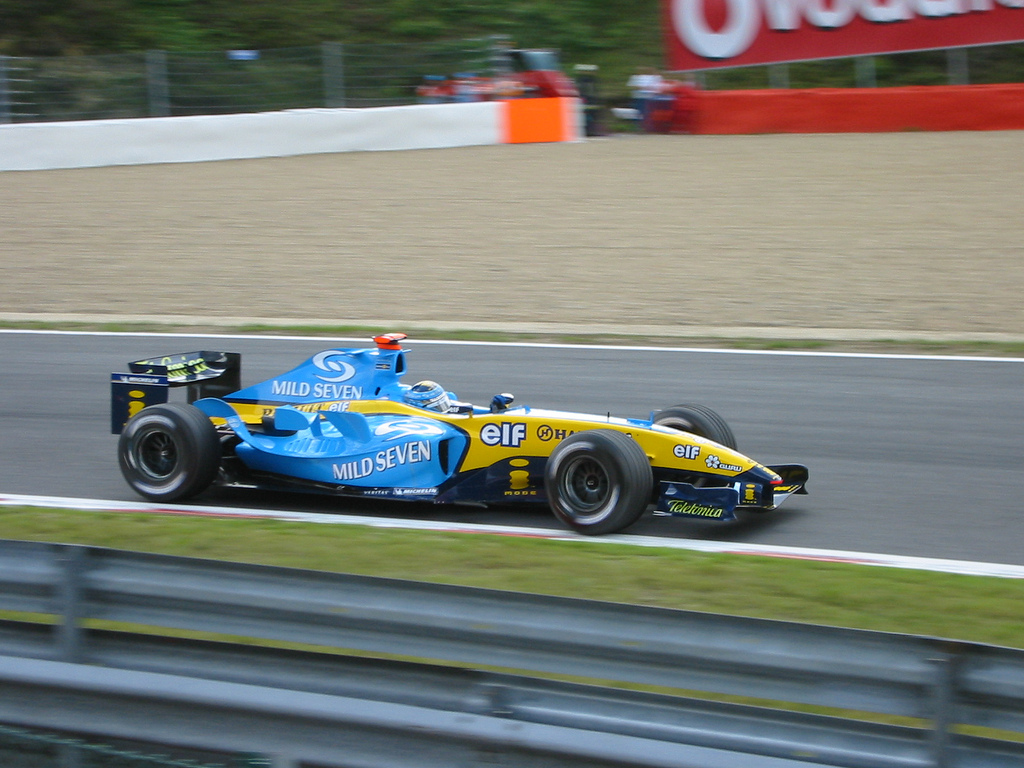
Jarno Trulli took pole position for the Renault team.

Qualifying was split into two sections. In the first session, dubbed "pre-qualifying", each driver took turns to record one lap at a time. The order the cars ran in was the reverse order to the classified results at the 2004 Hungarian Grand Prix. For example, Michael Schumacher won the race, so would be the last car to run in pre-qualifying. The second qualifying session (dubbed "qualifying") repeated this process (with the drivers running in reverse order to the pre-qualifying results), but with the caveat that the drivers would not be allowed to alter their fuel loads between then and the race. The fastest time in the second session would take pole. As in 2003, setups and fuel loads could not be altered between the end of the second qualifying session and the race. In pre-qualifying, Ricardo Zonta, driving for Toyota, spun off at Pouhon corner, leading him to collide with the tyre wall. The second part of qualifying started as being very wet but quickly dried out, enabling Jarno Trulli to switch to intermediate tyres, enabling him to set the fastest lap time. Schumacher qualified second. The conditions did not suit Jenson Button, who had run on wet tyres when the track was ready for intermediates, and Juan Pablo Montoya, who did his qualifying lap on intermediates as it began to rain.

=== Race ===
Trulli's Renault had a good start from pole position, but second-placed Schumacher's Ferrari did not, and he lost positions to Fernando Alonso's Renault and David Coulthard's McLaren. At La Source, Mark Webber's Jaguar collided with Barrichello's Ferrari, causing Webber to lose his front wing and Barrichello to suffer rear wing damage. In a separate incident, Räikkönen's McLaren made contact with Felipe Massa's Sauber, which caused Massa to lose his front wing. In a third incident, Nick Heidfeld's Jordan and Olivier Panis's Toyota made contact. Going into Eau Rouge, Webber was side-by-side with Takuma Sato's BAR, and they collided in the middle of the corner whilst they were overtaken by Montoya's Williams. The contact broke Sato's left rear suspension and Webber's front right suspension. Sato consequently spun in the middle of the track. The rest of the field attempted to avoid the spinning BAR, but in doing so, Zsolt Baumgartner and Gianmaria Bruni, both driving for Minardi, made contact, putting Bruni out of the race and getting him hit by Giorgio Pantano's Jordan. Sato, Webber, Bruni, and Pantano were out of the race. A small fire on Bruni's car, caused by the contact with Pantano, forced the safety car to come out. During this time, Button, Massa, Barrichello, Heidfeld, Baumgartner, and Olivier Panis stopped for repairs caused by debris. Massa and Barrichello stopped twice.

The safety car came in at the end of lap four and Trulli led Alonso and Coulthard. Räikkönen overtook Schumacher for fifth position and Button overtook Ricardo Zonta's Toyota. Schumacher continued to be slow, losing 1.1 seconds to Räikkönen in the middle sector on lap five, enabling Montoya to overtake him around the outside of the Bus Stop chicane on lap five. On lap six, Räikkönen overtook his teammate, Coulthard, for third, going up the inside at the Les Combes chicane. On lap eight, Barrichello overtook Baumgartner and Heidfeld, putting him into 14th place. Christian Klien, in the sole remaining Jaguar, was the first driver to make a scheduled pit stop, on lap nine, and race leader Trulli made a pit stop on lap 10, rejoining in ninth place. Alonso now led the race, but on lap 12 he had an oil leak and spun twice at Les Combes, losing the lead to Räikkönen. He managed to rejoin, but he then had a further spin at Rivage for the same reason and could not rejoin. On the same lap Coulthard had a rear tyre de-lamination, but he made it back to pit lane. Räikkönen stopped at the end of lap 13. Montoya now led the race from Schumacher, until Montoya pitted on lap 15. Montoya left the pit lane behind Massa, losing time while overtaking him. Schumacher pitted one lap later and leapfrogged Montoya. New leader Pizzonia came into the pits on lap 17. Räikkönen now led from Button in second, Trulli in third, and Schumacher in fourth, but Schumacher was able to overcome Trulli on lap 19.

Giancarlo Fisichella's Sauber ran wide on lap 20 and lost parts of his front wing. On the same lap, Montoya attempted to repeat his earlier overtake on Trulli, but the pair collided, putting Trulli into a spin. Trulli lost several places, and Montoya lost fourth place to his teammate, Pizzonia. Button pitted on lap 21, rejoining in seventh, behind the battling Fischella and Barrichello. Barrichello then took fifth place on lap 22, as Trulli made a second pit stop, having been passed by Panis. Button was also able to pass Fisichella for sixth position on lap 23, as Barrichello pitted. Räikkönen pitted on lap 29, rejoining in second position, while Schumacher still had to stop. Montoya pitted on the same lap as Räikkönen. On lap 31, Button suffered a right rear tyre de-lamination similar to Coulthard's, at approximately 205 mph (330 km/h), pitching him into a spin. As a result, he crashed into the Minardi of Baumgartner, who was being lapped, putting both drivers out of the race and bringing out a safety car. Schumacher, Pizzonia, and Heidfeld took the opportunity to pit behind the safety car.

Still behind the safety car, on lap 32, Pizzonia retired due to a gearbox problem. Räikkönen led the race from Schumacher, Montoya, Barrichello, and Zonta, who started last. At the restart on lap 34, Klien overtook Panis for eighth place and one point, as Coulthard overtook Trulli for tenth place. One lap later, Coulthard overtook Panis for ninth. On lap 36, Montoya's rear right tyre de-laminated, forcing him to retire.

On lap 38, Coulthard attempted to overtake Klien for seventh place, but contact between the two drivers meant Coulthard needed a new front wing after it broke loose, with parts of it becoming stuck in the rear of the McLaren's bodywork. The resulting debris caused the safety car to come out again. The safety car came in at the end of lap 41, but just four corners later, fourth-placed Zonta's engine blew up spectacularly, putting him out of the race. On the penultimate lap, Coulthard overtook Panis for seventh.

Räikkönen won the race, his first and only victory of 2004. Schumacher finished second, with teammate Barrichello third. The result gave Schumacher his seventh and last World Drivers' Championship.

=== Post-race ===
At the 2005 British Grand Prix, Daily Express editor Bob McKenzie honoured a pledge that he would run naked around Silverstone if McLaren won a race in 2004.

== Classification ==
=== Qualifying ===
Pos	No	Driver	Constructor	Q1 Time	Q2 Time	Gap	Grid
1	7	(Italy) Jarno Trulli	Renault	1:58.606	1:56.232	—	1
2	1	(Germany) Michael Schumacher	Ferrari	1:53.755	1:56.304	+0.072	2
3	8	(Spain) Fernando Alonso	Renault	1:58.242	1:56.686	+0.454	3
4	5	(United Kingdom) David Coulthard	McLaren-Mercedes	1:56.994	1:57.990	+1.758	4
5	11	(Italy) Giancarlo Fisichella	Sauber-Petronas	1:56.068	1:58.040	+1.808	5
6	2	(Brazil) Rubens Barrichello	Ferrari	1:54.913	1:58.175	+1.943	6
7	14	(Australia) Mark Webber	Jaguar-Cosworth	1:59.437	1:58.729	+2.497	7
8	12	(Brazil) Felipe Massa	Sauber-Petronas	1:56.057	1:59.008	+2.776	8
9	17	(France) Olivier Panis	Toyota	2:01.472	1:59.552	+3.320	9
10	6	(Finland) Kimi Räikkönen	McLaren-Mercedes	1:55.371	1:59.635	+3.403	10
11	3	(Colombia) Juan Pablo Montoya	Williams-BMW	1:56.842	1:59.681	+3.449	11
12	9	(United Kingdom) Jenson Button	BAR-Honda	1:58.837	2:00.237	+4.005	12
13	15	(Austria) Christian Klien	Jaguar-Cosworth	1:59.997	2:01.246	+5.014	13
14	4	(Brazil) Antônio Pizzonia	Williams-BMW	1:59.100	2:01.447	+5.215	14
15	10	(Japan) Takuma Sato	BAR-Honda	1:58.929	2:01.813	+5.581	15
16	18	(Germany) Nick Heidfeld	Jordan-Ford	2:00.166	2:02.645	+6.413	16
17	20	(Italy) Gianmaria Bruni	Minardi-Cosworth	2:03.226	2:02.651	+6.419	17
18	21	(Hungary) Zsolt Baumgartner	Minardi-Cosworth	2:01.195	2:03.303	+7.071	18
19	19	(Italy) Giorgio Pantano	Jordan-Ford	1:59.442	2:03.833	+7.601	19
20	16	(Brazil) Ricardo Zonta	Toyota	No time^{1}	2:03.895	+7.663	20

Notes

- ^1 – Ricardo Zonta did not get any time in Q1 after going off the track at the eleventh corner.

=== Race ===
Pos	No	Driver	Constructor	Tyre	Laps	Time/Retired	Grid	Points
1	6	(Finland) Kimi Räikkönen	McLaren-Mercedes	M	44	1:32:35.274	10	10
2	1	(Germany) Michael Schumacher	Ferrari	B	44	+3.132	2	8
3	2	(Brazil) Rubens Barrichello	Ferrari	B	44	+4.371	6	6
4	12	(Brazil) Felipe Massa	Sauber-Petronas	B	44	+12.504	8	5
5	11	(Italy) Giancarlo Fisichella	Sauber-Petronas	B	44	+14.104	5	4
6	15	(Austria) Christian Klien	Jaguar-Cosworth	M	44	+14.614	13	3
7	5	(United Kingdom) David Coulthard	McLaren-Mercedes	M	44	+17.970	4	2
8	17	(France) Olivier Panis	Toyota	M	44	+18.693	9	1
9	7	(Italy) Jarno Trulli	Renault	M	44	+22.115	1	
10	16	(Brazil) Ricardo Zonta	Toyota	M	41	Engine	20	
11	18	(Germany) Nick Heidfeld	Jordan-Ford	B	40	+4 laps	16	
Ret	3	(Colombia) Juan Pablo Montoya	Williams-BMW	M	37	Tyre	11	
Ret	4	(Brazil) Antônio Pizzonia	Williams-BMW	M	31	Gearbox	14	
Ret	9	(United Kingdom) Jenson Button	BAR-Honda	M	29	Tyre/collision	12	
Ret	21	(Hungary) Zsolt Baumgartner	Minardi-Cosworth	B	28	Collision	18	
Ret	8	(Spain) Fernando Alonso	Renault	M	11	Engine/spin	3	
Ret	14	(Australia) Mark Webber	Jaguar-Cosworth	M	0	Collision damage	7	
Ret	10	(Japan) Takuma Sato	BAR-Honda	M	0	Collision	15	
Ret	20	(Italy) Gianmaria Bruni	Minardi-Cosworth	B	0	Collision/fire	17	
Ret	19	(Italy) Giorgio Pantano	Jordan-Ford	B	0	Collision	19	

== Championship standings after the race ==
- Bold text and an asterisk indicates the World Champions.

Drivers' Championship standings

Pos	Driver	Points
1	(Germany) Michael Schumacher*	128
2	(Brazil) Rubens Barrichello	88
3	(United Kingdom) Jenson Button	65
4	(Italy) Jarno Trulli	46
5	(Spain) Fernando Alonso	45

Constructors' Championship standings

Pos	Constructor	Points
1	(Italy) Ferrari*	216
2	(France) Renault	91
3	(United Kingdom) BAR-Honda	83
4	(United Kingdom) Williams-BMW	54
5	(United Kingdom) McLaren-Mercedes	49

- Note: Only the top five positions are included for both sets of standings.

== See also ==
- 2004 Spa-Francorchamps F3000 round

Previous race: 2004 Hungarian Grand Prix	FIA Formula One World Championship; 2004 season	Next race: 2004 Italian Grand Prix
Previous race: 2002 Belgian Grand Prix	Belgian Grand Prix	Next race: 2005 Belgian Grand Prix
