= Sauber Petronas Engineering =

Swiss F1 engine manufacturer

Sauber Petronas Engineering AG
- Type: Private company
- Industry: Automotive
- Founded: Hinwil, 1996
- Founder: Peter Sauber and Willy Rampf
- Defunct: 2005 (due to BMW purchase)
- Headquarters: Hinwil, Switzerland
- Area served: Worldwide
- Key people: Peter Sauber, Willy Rampf and Osamu Goto
- Products: Engines and hydraulic manifolds
- Services: High performance engineering
- Parent: Sauber F1 Team and Petronas

Petronas as a Formula One engine manufacturer
Formula One World Championship career
- First entry: 1997 Australian Grand Prix
- Last entry: 2005 Chinese Grand Prix
- Races entered: 153 (151 starts)
- Chassis: Sauber
- Constructors' Championships: 0 (Best result: 4th, 2001)
- Drivers' Championships: 0 (Best result: 8th, 2001, Nick Heidfeld)
- Race victories: 0
- Podiums: 4
- Points: 142
- Pole positions: 0
- Fastest laps: 0

Sauber Petronas Engineering AG (SPE) was a company owned by the Swiss racing car manufacturer Sauber (60%) and the Malaysian oil company Petronas (40%). It was founded in 1996 for the purpose of supplying engines to the Sauber Formula One team, though at the same time the company began work on the design of production car engines for the Malaysian national car company Proton. The company also helped develop racing motorcycles like Petronas GP1.

Former Honda and Ferrari engineer Osamu Goto was in charge of the Powertrain Division, including the F1 engine program.

The engines were for many years nearly identical to the ones used by Ferrari but were branded Petronas. Sauber licensed nearly every legally licensable part from Ferrari and even had several Ferrari engineers on staff. Many pointed out suspicious similarities between the Ferrari and Sauber chassis, but no formal accusations were ever made, even as FIA rules require each team to design their own chassis.

The long-term aim of Sauber Petronas was to design and build its own F1 engines for the 1999 season but the programme was abandoned, choosing instead to continue with the Ferrari units.

In 1998, Petronas commissioned the Powertrain Division of SPE to design their own first commercial automotive engine, the Petronas E01e engine.

After the 2005 season, Sauber was bought by BMW and the co-operation with Ferrari ended.

== Formula One engine results ==
(key; results in bold indicate pole position; results in italics indicate fastest lap)

Year	Entrant	Chassis	Engine	Tyres	Drivers	1	2	3	4	5	6	7	8	9	10	11	12	13	14	15	16	17	18	19	Points	WCC
1997	Red Bull Sauber Petronas	Sauber C16	Petronas SPE-01 3.0 V10	G		AUS	BRA	ARG	SMR	MON	ESP	CAN	FRA	GBR	GER	HUN	BEL	ITA	AUT	LUX	JPN	EUR			16	7th
1997	Red Bull Sauber Petronas	Sauber C16	Petronas SPE-01 3.0 V10	G	(United Kingdom) Johnny Herbert	Ret	7	4	Ret	Ret	5	5	8	Ret	Ret	3	4	Ret	8	7	6	8			16	7th
1997	Red Bull Sauber Petronas	Sauber C16	Petronas SPE-01 3.0 V10	G	(Italy) Nicola Larini	6	11	Ret	7	Ret															16	7th
1997	Red Bull Sauber Petronas	Sauber C16	Petronas SPE-01 3.0 V10	G	(Italy) Gianni Morbidelli						14	10				Ret	9	12	9	9	DNS				16	7th
1997	Red Bull Sauber Petronas	Sauber C16	Petronas SPE-01 3.0 V10	G	(Argentina) Norberto Fontana								Ret	9	9							14			16	7th
1998	Red Bull Sauber Petronas	Sauber C17	Petronas SPE-01D V10	G		AUS	BRA	ARG	SMR	ESP	MON	CAN	FRA	GBR	AUT	GER	HUN	BEL	ITA	LUX	JPN				10	6th
1998	Red Bull Sauber Petronas	Sauber C17	Petronas SPE-01D V10	G	(France) Jean Alesi	Ret	9	5	6	10	12^{†}	Ret	7	Ret	Ret	10	7	3	5	10	7				10	6th
1998	Red Bull Sauber Petronas	Sauber C17	Petronas SPE-01D V10	G	(United Kingdom) Johnny Herbert	6	11^{†}	Ret	Ret	7	7	Ret	8	Ret	8	Ret	10	Ret	Ret	Ret	10				10	6th
1999	Red Bull Sauber Petronas	Sauber C18	Petronas SPE-03A 3.0 V10	B		AUS	BRA	SMR	MON	ESP	CAN	FRA	GBR	AUT	GER	HUN	BEL	ITA	EUR	MAL	JPN				5	8th
1999	Red Bull Sauber Petronas	Sauber C18	Petronas SPE-03A 3.0 V10	B	(France) Jean Alesi	Ret	Ret	6	Ret	Ret	Ret	Ret	14	Ret	8	16^{†}	9	9	Ret	7	6				5	8th
1999	Red Bull Sauber Petronas	Sauber C18	Petronas SPE-03A 3.0 V10	B	(Brazil) Pedro Diniz	Ret	Ret	Ret	Ret	Ret	6	Ret	6	6	Ret	Ret	Ret	Ret	Ret	Ret	11				5	8th
2000	Red Bull Sauber Petronas	Sauber C19	Petronas SPE 04A 3.0 V10	B		AUS	BRA	SMR	GBR	ESP	EUR	MON	CAN	FRA	AUT	GER	HUN	BEL	ITA	USA	JPN	MAL			6	8th
2000	Red Bull Sauber Petronas	Sauber C19	Petronas SPE 04A 3.0 V10	B	(Brazil) Pedro Diniz	Ret	DNS	8	11	Ret	7	Ret	10	11	9	Ret	Ret	11	8	8	11	Ret			6	8th
2000	Red Bull Sauber Petronas	Sauber C19	Petronas SPE 04A 3.0 V10	B	(Finland) Mika Salo	DSQ	DNS	6	8	7	Ret	5	Ret	10	6	5	10	9	7	Ret	10	8			6	8th
2001	Red Bull Sauber Petronas	Sauber C20	Petronas 01A 3.0 V10	B		AUS	MAL	BRA	SMR	ESP	AUT	MON	CAN	EUR	FRA	GBR	GER	HUN	BEL	ITA	USA	JPN			21	4th
2001	Red Bull Sauber Petronas	Sauber C20	Petronas 01A 3.0 V10	B	(Germany) Nick Heidfeld	4	Ret	3	7	6	9	Ret	Ret	Ret	6	6	Ret	6	Ret	11	6	9			21	4th
2001	Red Bull Sauber Petronas	Sauber C20	Petronas 01A 3.0 V10	B	(Finland) Kimi Räikkönen	6	Ret	Ret	Ret	8	4	10	4	10	7	5	Ret	7	DNS	7	Ret	Ret			21	4th
2002	Red Bull Sauber Petronas	Sauber C21	Petronas 02A 3.0 V10	B		AUS	MAL	BRA	SMR	ESP	AUT	MON	CAN	EUR	GBR	FRA	GER	HUN	BEL	ITA	USA	JPN			11	5th
2002	Red Bull Sauber Petronas	Sauber C21	Petronas 02A 3.0 V10	B	(Germany) Nick Heidfeld	Ret	5	Ret	10	4	Ret	8	12	7	6	7	6	9	10	10	9	7			11	5th
2002	Red Bull Sauber Petronas	Sauber C21	Petronas 02A 3.0 V10	B	(Brazil) Felipe Massa	Ret	6	Ret	8	5	Ret	Ret	9	6	9	Ret	7	7	Ret	Ret		Ret			11	5th
2002	Red Bull Sauber Petronas	Sauber C21	Petronas 02A 3.0 V10	B	(Germany) Heinz-Harald Frentzen																13				11	5th
2003	Red Bull Sauber Petronas	Sauber C22	Petronas 03A 3.0 V10	B		AUS	MAL	BRA	SMR	ESP	AUT	MON	CAN	EUR	FRA	GBR	GER	HUN	ITA	USA	JPN				19	6th
2003	Red Bull Sauber Petronas	Sauber C22	Petronas 03A 3.0 V10	B	(Germany) Nick Heidfeld	Ret	8	Ret	10	10	Ret	11	Ret	8	13	17	10	9	9	5	9				19	6th
2003	Red Bull Sauber Petronas	Sauber C22	Petronas 03A 3.0 V10	B	(Germany) Heinz-Harald Frentzen	6	9	5	11	Ret	DNS	Ret	Ret	9	12	12	Ret	Ret	13^{†}	3	Ret				19	6th
2004	Red Bull Sauber Petronas	Sauber C23	Petronas 04A 3.0 V10	B		AUS	MAL	BHR	SMR	ESP	MON	EUR	CAN	USA	FRA	GBR	GER	HUN	BEL	ITA	CHN	JPN	BRA		34	6th
2004	Red Bull Sauber Petronas	Sauber C23	Petronas 04A 3.0 V10	B	(Italy) Giancarlo Fisichella	10	11	11	9	7	Ret	6	4	9^{†}	12	6	9	8	5	8	7	8	9		34	6th
2004	Red Bull Sauber Petronas	Sauber C23	Petronas 04A 3.0 V10	B	(Brazil) Felipe Massa	Ret	8	12	10	9	5	9	Ret	Ret	13	9	13	Ret	4	12	8	9	8		34	6th
2005	Sauber Petronas	Sauber C24	Petronas 05A 3.0 V10	MI		AUS	MAL	BHR	SMR	ESP	MON	EUR	CAN	USA	FRA	GBR	GER	HUN	TUR	ITA	BEL	BRA	JPN	CHN	20	8th
2005	Sauber Petronas	Sauber C24	Petronas 05A 3.0 V10	MI	(Canada) Jacques Villeneuve	13	Ret	11^{†}	4	Ret	11	13	9	DNS	8	14	15	Ret	11	11	6	12	12	10	20	8th
2005	Sauber Petronas	Sauber C24	Petronas 05A 3.0 V10	MI	(Brazil) Felipe Massa	10	10	7	10	11^{†}	9	14	4	DNS	Ret	10	8	14	Ret	9	10	11	10	6	20	8th
