= Zsolt Baumgartner =

Hungarian racing driver (born 1981)

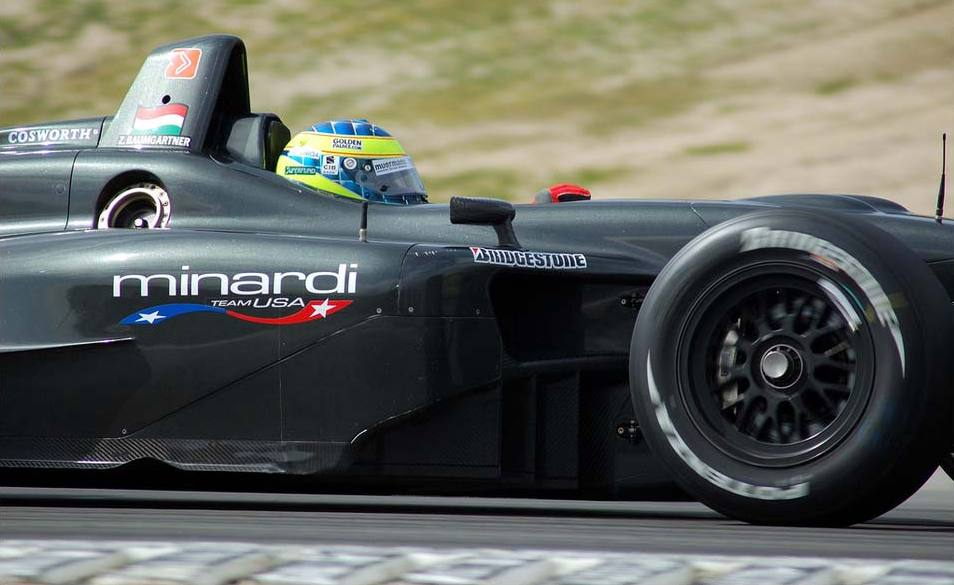
- Baumgartner testing in 2007
- Born: 1 January 1981 (age 45); Debrecen, Hungary

Formula One World Championship career
- Nationality: (Hungary) Hungarian
- Active years: 2003–2004
- Team(s): Jordan, Minardi
- Entries: 20
- Championships: 0
- Wins: 0
- Podiums: 0
- Career points: 1
- Pole positions: 0
- Fastest laps: 0
- First entry: 2003 Hungarian Grand Prix
- Last entry: 2004 Brazilian Grand Prix

Zsolt Baumgartner (born 1 January 1981) is a Hungarian former racing driver who raced for the Jordan and Minardi teams in Formula One. He remains the only Hungarian driver to have competed and to have scored a point in Formula One.

== Junior racing career ==
Zsolt Baumgartner was born in Debrecen, Hungary on 1 January 1981. His father was a Renault dealer. He started karting at the age of 13 and moved into single seaters in 1997, driving in German Formula Ford. He subsequently had stints in German Formula 3, Formula Renault and Formula 3000.

In 2002, Eddie Jordan signed Baumgartner as the reserve and test driver of Jordan Grand Prix, and that same year he conducted a test run at the Hungaroring prior to the 2002 Hungarian Grand Prix.

== Career ==
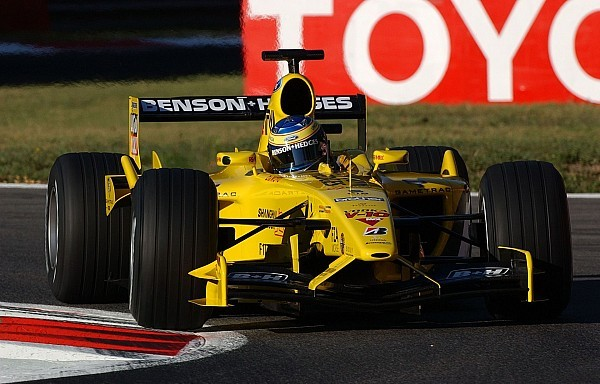
Baumgartner at the 2003 Italian Grand Prix

Baumgartner made his Formula One race debut at the 2003 Hungarian Grand Prix, substituting for the injured Ralph Firman in the Jordan team; he also took part in the Italian Grand Prix that year.

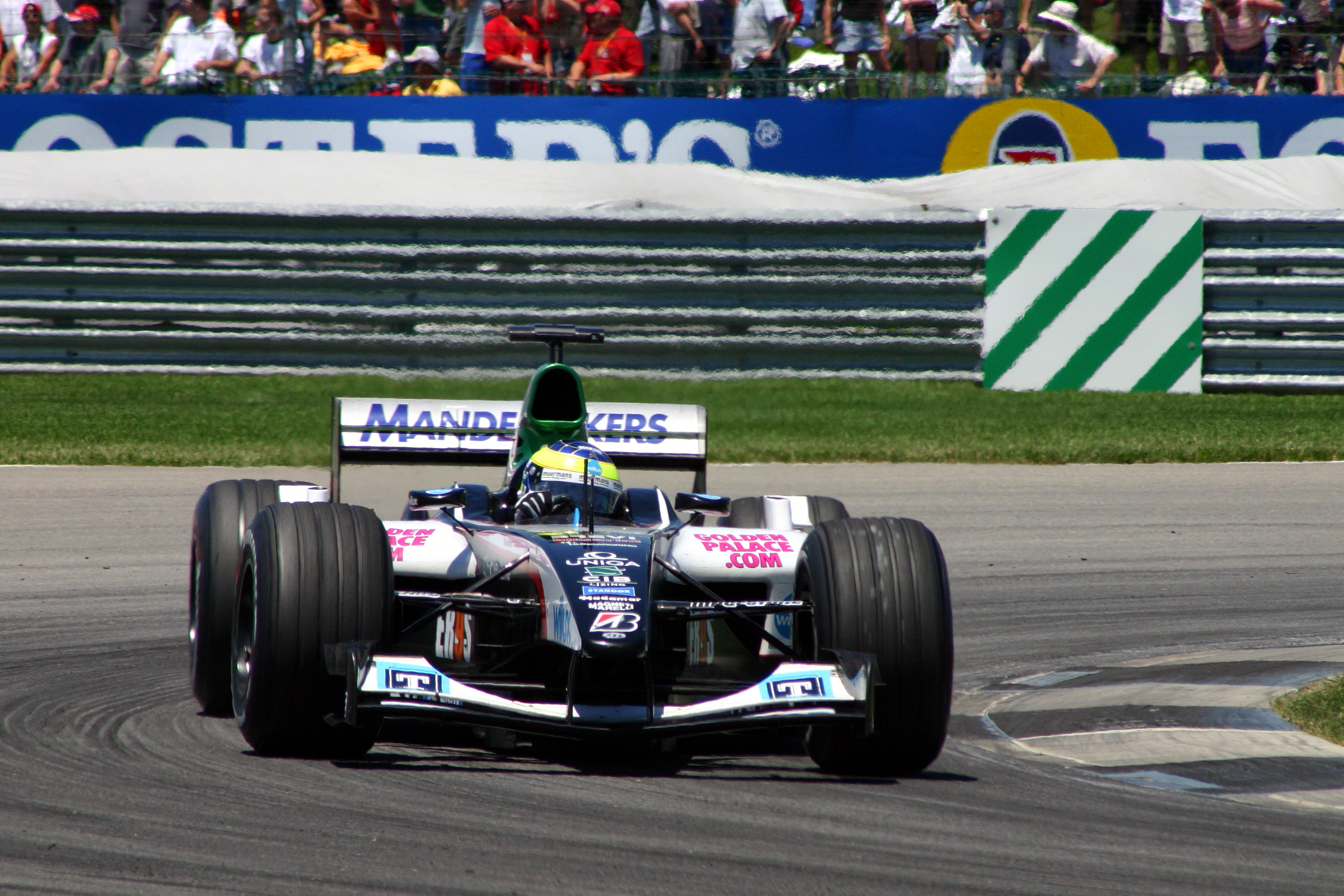
Baumgartner at the 2004 United States Grand Prix.

Plans were made for Baumgartner to drive for Jordan again in 2004 with sponsorship from oil company MOL Rt. However, he failed to agree terms with Jordan and was signed by Minardi instead. This caused MOL Rt. to decrease its sponsorship amount, leading Baumgartner and his management to set up a "Zsolt Baumgartner Supporter's Club", a plan similar to that employed by Justin Wilson in 2003.

Baumgartner raced throughout the 2004 Formula One season, and after two near-misses (ninth in Monaco and tenth in Canada) he managed to take Minardi's first point in over two years by finishing eighth (classified second last and the last car to take the chequered flag) in the United States Grand Prix held at Indianapolis Motor Speedway.

== Champ Car World Series ==
In March 2007, Baumgartner was confirmed as the test and reserve driver for Minardi Team USA, former boss Paul Stoddart's recently acquired Champ Car World Series team. He only participated in a handful of tests for the team and made no race starts. Prior to the 2008 season, Champ Car unified with the rival IndyCar Series and Stoddart and the Minardi name left the sport.

== Superleague Formula ==
In 2008, Baumgartner became the test driver for team Tottenham Hotspur F.C. in Superleague Formula.

== Racing record ==
=== Racing career summary ===
Season	Series	Team	Races	Poles	Wins	FLaps	Podiums	Points	Position
1998	Championnat de France Formule Renault	La Filière	21	0	0	0	0	0	NC
1998	Formula Renault 2.0 UK Winter Series		4	?	0	?	?	44	6th
1999	Eurocup Formula Renault	Cram Competition	9	?	0	?	?	108	3rd
1999	Formula Renault Germany		4	4	3	?	4	N/A	NC
2000	German Formula Three Championship	GM Motorsport	18	0	0	0	1	41	13th
2000	Macau Grand Prix	GM Motorsport	1	0	0	0	0	N/A	14th
2000	Korea Super Prix	GM Motorsport	1	0	0	0	0	N/A	NC
2001	German Formula Three Championship	MOL-Trella Motorsport	18	0	0	0	0	25	17th
2001	International Formula 3000 Championship	F3000 Prost Junior Team	7	0	0	0	0	0	29th
2001	Masters of Formula 3	MOL-Trella Motorsport	1	0	0	0	0	N/A	28th
2002	International Formula 3000 Championship	Coca-Cola Nordic Racing	12	0	0	0	0	1	15th
2003	International Formula 3000 Championship	Coloni Motorsport	8	0	0	0	0	6	14th
2003	Formula One	Benson & Hedges Jordan Ford	2	0	0	0	0	0	24th
2004	Formula One	Minardi Cosworth	18	0	0	0	0	1	20th
2007	Champ Car World Series	Minardi Team USA	Test Driver						
2008	Superleague Formula	Tottenham Hotspur F.C.	Test Driver						

=== Complete German Formula Three Championship results ===
(key)

Year	Entrant	Chassis	Engine	1	2	3	4	5	6	7	8	9	10	11	12	13	14	15	16	17	18	19	20	DC	Points
2000	GM Motorsport	Dallara F399	Opel	ZOL; 1; 7	ZOL; 2; 5	HOC1; 1; 4	HOC1; 2 Ret	OSC1; 1; 22	OSC1; 2; 8	NOR; 1; 9	NOR; 2; 4	SAC; 1	SAC; 2	NÜR1; 1; 7	NÜR1; 2; 14	LAU; 1; 18	LAU; 2; 19	OSC2; 1; 12	OSC2; 2 Ret	NÜR2; 1 Ret	NÜR2; 2 Ret	HOC2; 1; 15	HOC2; 2; 11	13th	41
2001	MOL — Trella Motorsport	Dallara F300	Opel	HOC1; 1; 11	HOC1; 2; 7	NÜR1; 1; 9	NÜR1; 2; 8	OSC; 1; 18	OSC; 2; 18	SAC; 1; 9	SAC; 2; 6	NOR; 1; 9	NOR; 2; 13	HOC2; 1 Ret	HOC2; 2; 13	LAU; 1; 9	LAU; 2; 13	NÜR2; 1 Ret	NÜR2; 2; 10	A1R; 1; 8	A1R; 2 Ret	HOC3; 1	HOC3; 2	17th	25

=== Complete International Formula 3000 results ===
(key)

Year	Entrant	1	2	3	4	5	6	7	8	9	10	11	12	DC	Points
2001	F3000 Prost Junior Team	INT	IMO	CAT	A1R	MON	NUR; 19	MAG; Ret	SIL; 18	HOC; 16	HUN; Ret	SPA; 13	MNZ; 17	29th	0
2002	Coca-Cola Nordic Racing	INT; Ret	IMO; 9	CAT; Ret	A1R; 11	MON; Ret	NUR; 12	SIL; 14	MAG; 12	HOC; 8	HUN; 7	SPA; 8	MNZ; 6	15th	1
2003	Coloni Motorsport	IMO; 10	CAT; 7	A1R; 10	MON; 5	NUR; 11	MAG; 9	SIL; 11	HOC; 9	HUN; DNS	MNZ			14th	6

=== Complete Formula One results ===
(key)

Year	Entrant	Chassis	Engine	1	2	3	4	5	6	7	8	9	10	11	12	13	14	15	16	17	18	WDC	Pts
2003	Benson & Hedges Jordan Ford	Jordan EJ13	Ford V10	AUS	MAL	BRA	SMR	ESP	AUT	MON	CAN	EUR	FRA	GBR	GER; TD	HUN; Ret	ITA; 11	USA	JPN			24th	0
2004	Wilux Minardi Cosworth	Minardi PS04B	Cosworth V10	AUS; Ret	MAL; 16	BHR; Ret	SMR; 15	ESP; Ret	MON; 9	EUR; 15	CAN; 10	USA; 8	FRA; Ret	GBR; Ret	GER; 16							20th	1
2004	Minardi Cosworth	Minardi PS04B	Cosworth V10													HUN; 15	BEL; Ret	ITA; 15	CHN; 16	JPN; Ret	BRA; 16	20th	1

Sporting positions
Preceded by Hugo van der Ham	German Formula Renault; Champion; 1999	Succeeded by Marcel Lasée
