= 2003 Italian Grand Prix =

Coordinates: 45°36′56″N 9°16′52″E

Race 14 of 16 in the 2003 Formula One World Championship
← Previous race	Next race →

Race details
- Date: September 14, 2003
- Official name: Gran Premio Vodafone d'Italia 2003
- Location: Autodromo Nazionale di Monza, Monza, Italy
- Course: Permanent racing facility
- Course length: 5.793 km (3.600 miles)
- Distance: 53 laps, 306.720 km (190.587 miles)
- Weather: Sunny

Pole position
Driver	(Germany) Michael Schumacher	Ferrari
- Time: 1:20.963

Fastest lap
Driver	(Germany) Michael Schumacher	Ferrari
- Time: 1:21.832 on lap 14

Podium
First	(Germany) Michael Schumacher	Ferrari
Second	(Colombia) Juan Pablo Montoya	Williams-BMW
Third	(Brazil) Rubens Barrichello	Ferrari

The 2003 Italian Grand Prix (officially known as the Gran Premio Vodafone d'Italia 2003) was a Formula One motor race that took place on 14 September 2003 at the Autodromo Nazionale di Monza in Monza, Italy. It was the fourteenth round of the 2003 Formula One World Championship. Michael Schumacher took pole position for the race in the Ferrari and went on to take the race win, ahead of Juan Pablo Montoya for Williams and Rubens Barrichello in the other Ferrari.

With an average speed of 247.585 km/h (153.842 mph), this race stood as the fastest-ever Formula One race for 22 years, until the 2025 Italian Grand Prix at Monza.

== Background ==
The event was held at the Autodromo Nazionale di Monza for the 53rd time in the circuit's history, across the weekend of 12–14 September. The Grand Prix was the fourteenth round of the 2003 Formula One World Championship and the 54th running of the Italian Grand Prix as part of the Formula One World Championship.

=== Championship standings before the race ===
Going into the weekend, Michael Schumacher led the Drivers' Championship with 72 points, 1 point ahead of Juan Pablo Montoya in second and 2 ahead of Kimi Räikkönen in third. Williams, with 129 points, led the Constructors' Championship for the first time since their title in 1997, from Ferrari and McLaren, who were second and third with 121 and 115 points, respectively.

== Practice ==
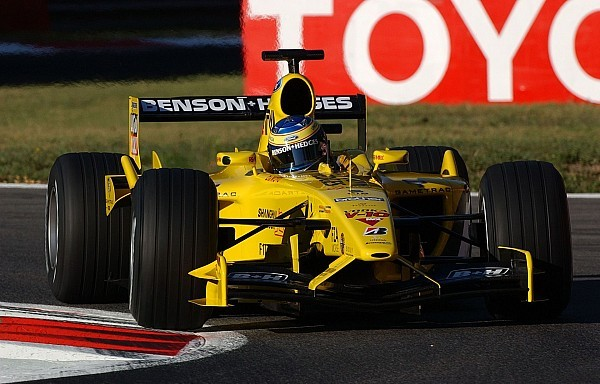
Like in Hungary, Zsolt Baumgartner stood in for Ralph Firman at Jordan

Three free practice sessions were held for the event. Ferrari driver Rubens Barrichello set the fastest time in the first session, ahead of teammate Michael Schumacher and McLaren's Kimi Räikkönen, in second and third places respectively. In the second session, Schumacher was ahead of Barrichello, and David Coulthard was the McLaren in third. Juan Pablo Montoya led the third practice session in his Williams, ahead of Michael Schumacher and stand-in teammate Marc Gené.

=== Friday drivers ===
Three teams in the 2003 Constructors' Championship had the right to run a third car on Friday's additional testing. These drivers did not compete in qualifying or the race.

Constructor	Nat	Driver
Renault	(United Kingdom)	Allan McNish
Jordan-Ford		-
Minardi-Cosworth	(Italy)	Gianmaria Bruni

== Qualifying ==
Qualiyfing consisted of two one-hour sessions, one on Friday and one on Saturday afternoon. The first session's running order was determined by the Drivers' Championship standings, with the leading driver going first. Each driver was allowed to set one lap time. The result determined the running order in the second session: the fastest driver in the first session was allowed to go last in the second session, which usually provided the benefit of a cleaner track. Drivers were again allowed to set one lap time, which determined the order on the grid for the race on Sunday, with the fastest driver scoring pole position.

Pos	No	Driver	Constructor	Q1 Time	Q2 Time	Gap	Grid
1	1	(Germany) Michael Schumacher	Ferrari	1:21.268	1:20.963		1
2	3	(Colombia) Juan Pablo Montoya	Williams-BMW	1:20.656	1:21.014	+0.051	2
3	2	(Brazil) Rubens Barrichello	Ferrari	1:20.784	1:21.242	+0.279	3
4	6	(Finland) Kimi Räikkönen	McLaren-Mercedes	1:21.966	1:21.466	+0.503	4
5	4	(Spain) Marc Gené	Williams-BMW	-^{1}	1:21.834	+0.871	5
6	7	(Italy) Jarno Trulli	Renault	1:22.034	1:21.944	+0.981	6
7	17	(United Kingdom) Jenson Button	BAR-Honda	1:22.495	1:22.301	+1.338	7
8	5	(United Kingdom) David Coulthard	McLaren-Mercedes	1:23.154	1:22.471	+1.508	8
9	20	(France) Olivier Panis	Toyota	1:22.372	1:22.488	+1.525	9
10	16	(Canada) Jacques Villeneuve	BAR-Honda	1:22.858	1:22.717	+1.754	10
11	14	(Australia) Mark Webber	Jaguar-Cosworth	1:21.966	1:22.754	+1.791	11
12	21	(Brazil) Cristiano da Matta	Toyota	1:21.829	1:22.914	+1.951	12
13	11	(Italy) Giancarlo Fisichella	Jordan-Ford	1:24.179	1:22.992	+2.029	13
14	10	(Germany) Heinz-Harald Frentzen	Sauber-Petronas	1:22.203	1:23.216	+2.253	14
15	15	(United Kingdom) Justin Wilson	Jaguar-Cosworth	1:23.609	1:23.484	+2.521	15
16	9	(Germany) Nick Heidfeld	Sauber-Petronas	1:22.547	1:23.803	+2.840	16
17	19	(Netherlands) Jos Verstappen	Minardi-Cosworth	No Time^{2}	1:25.078	+4.115	17
18	12	(Hungary) Zsolt Baumgartner	Jordan-Ford	1:24.872	1:25.881	+4.918	18
19	18	(Denmark) Nicolas Kiesa	Minardi-Cosworth	1:26.299	1:26.778	+5.815	19
20	8	(Spain) Fernando Alonso	Renault	1:22.103	1:40.405^{3}	+19.442	20
	4	(Germany) Ralf Schumacher	Williams-BMW	No time^{4}	-^{1}		

Notes

- ^1 - Earlier in September, Ralf Schumacher had crashed during a private test session at Monza. He was cleared by Formula One's race doctor Sid Watkins and participated in Friday testing and qualifying, but together with his team, the German decided to step back and let third driver Marc Gené stand in, ahead of the sessions on Saturday.
- ^2 - Jos Verstappen did not set a time in Q1 due to engine problems.
- ^3 - Fernando Alonso spun coming out of the first corner due to a problem with his traction control.
- ^4 - Ralf Schumacher initially set a lap time in Q1 (1:21.965), but his time was removed after cutting the first chicane on his flying lap.

== Race ==
The race was held on 13 September 2003 and was run for 53 laps.

=== Race report ===
At the start, Michael Schumacher almost braked too late for the first chicane but was just able to make the first corner and hold on to his lead, ahead of Juan Pablo Montoya and Jarno Trulli, who had made a very fast start from sixth on the grid. The other Renault of Fernando Alonso hit the back of Justin Wilson, who had stalled on the grid. He lost his front wing but was able to continue after making a pit stop. Attempting a pass around the outside into the second chicane, Montoya got alongside and even momentarily ahead of Schumacher, but he was slower exiting the corner and came under pressure from Trulli behind him. The Renault, however, suddenly lost hydraulic pressure and Trulli was out of the race before the first lap was over.

Montoya remained close to Schumacher but never close enough to launch an attack. When Schumacher rejoined after his second pit stop, however, he saw a Williams going past. The Ferrari team, as well as the TV commentators, thought Schumacher had lost the lead, until they realized that it was the Williams of Marc Gené, who still had to pit. In the second half of the race, Montoya lost time due to backmarkers and finished more than five seconds behind Schumacher. Rubens Barrichello and Kimi Räikkönen had been fighting over third place, with the Ferrari driver holding on to take the last podium place. Gené by finishing 5th secured his first points finish since the 1999 European Grand Prix.

=== Post-race ===
Michael Schumacher's first win since Canada saw him increasing his gap to Montoya to three points. Räikkönen was seven points behind in third. Ralf Schumacher's withdrawal from the race, coupled with the result, ended his chances of winning his first drivers' title as he was officially eliminated from championship contention alongside Barrichello and Alonso. Ferrari reduced the gap to Williams to four points in the Constructors' Championship; McLaren remained third with a 21-points-deficit to overcome heading into the last two races of the season.

=== Race classification ===
Pos	No	Driver	Constructor	Tyre	Laps	Time/Retired	Grid	Points
1	1	(Germany) Michael Schumacher	Ferrari	B	53	1:14:19.838	1	10
2	3	(Colombia) Juan Pablo Montoya	Williams-BMW	M	53	+5.294	2	8
3	2	(Brazil) Rubens Barrichello	Ferrari	B	53	+11.835	3	6
4	6	(Finland) Kimi Räikkönen	McLaren-Mercedes	M	53	+12.834	4	5
5	4	(Spain) Marc Gené	Williams-BMW	M	53	+27.891	5	4
6	16	(Canada) Jacques Villeneuve	BAR-Honda	B	52	+1 Lap	10	3
7	14	(Australia) Mark Webber	Jaguar-Cosworth	M	52	+1 Lap	11	2
8	8	(Spain) Fernando Alonso	Renault	M	52	+1 Lap	20	1
9	9	(Germany) Nick Heidfeld	Sauber-Petronas	B	52	+1 Lap	16	
10	11	(Italy) Giancarlo Fisichella	Jordan-Ford	B	52	+1 Lap	PL^{5}	
11	12	(Hungary) Zsolt Baumgartner	Jordan-Ford	B	51	+2 Laps	18	
12	18	(Denmark) Nicolas Kiesa	Minardi-Cosworth	B	51	+2 Laps	19	
13	10	(Germany) Heinz-Harald Frentzen	Sauber-Petronas	B	50	Transmission	14	
Ret	5	(United Kingdom) David Coulthard	McLaren-Mercedes	M	45	Fuel pressure	8	
Ret	20	(France) Olivier Panis	Toyota	M	35	Brakes	9	
Ret	19	(Netherlands) Jos Verstappen	Minardi-Cosworth	B	27	Oil leak	17	
Ret	17	(United Kingdom) Jenson Button	BAR-Honda	B	24	Gearbox	7	
Ret	21	(Brazil) Cristiano da Matta	Toyota	M	3	Tyre/Spun off	12	
Ret	15	(United Kingdom) Justin Wilson	Jaguar-Cosworth	M	2	Gearbox	15	
Ret	7	(Italy) Jarno Trulli	Renault	M	0	Hydraulics	6	

Notes

- ^5 - Giancarlo Fisichella started the race from the pitlane.

== Championship standings after the race ==
Drivers' Championship standings

+/–	Pos	Driver	Points
	1	(Germany) **Michael Schumacher***	82
	2	(Colombia) **Juan Pablo Montoya***	79
	3	(Finland) **Kimi Räikkönen***	75
	4	(Germany) Ralf Schumacher	58
1	5	(Brazil) Rubens Barrichello	55

Constructors' Championship standings

+/–	Pos	Constructor	Points
	1	(United Kingdom) **Williams-BMW***	141
	2	(Italy) **Ferrari***	137
	3	(United Kingdom) **McLaren-Mercedes***	120
	4	(France) Renault	79
	5	(United Kingdom) BAR-Honda	18

- Note: Only the top five positions are included for both sets of standings.
- Competitors in bold and marked with an asterisk still had a theoretical chance of becoming World Champion.

Previous race: 2003 Hungarian Grand Prix	FIA Formula One World Championship; 2003 season	Next race: 2003 United States Grand Prix
Previous race: 2002 Italian Grand Prix	Italian Grand Prix	Next race: 2004 Italian Grand Prix
