= 2004 Monza F3000 round =

- Race 10 of 10 in the 2004 International Formula 3000 Championship

Race details
- Date: 11 September 2004
- Location: Autodromo Nazionale di Monza, Monza, Italy
- Course: Permanent racing facility
- Course length: 5.793 km (3.600 miles)
- Distance: 26 laps, 150.353 km (93.429 miles)

Pole position
Driver	(Italy) Vitantonio Liuzzi	Arden International
- Time: 1:38.647

Fastest lap
Driver	(Italy) Vitantonio Liuzzi	Arden International
- Time: 1:39.775 on lap 23

Podium
First	(Italy) Vitantonio Liuzzi	Arden International
Second	(Czech Republic) Tomáš Enge	Ma-Con Engineering
Third	(Monaco) Robert Doornbos	Arden International

The 2004 Monza F3000 round was a motor racing event held on 11 September 2004 at the Autodromo Nazionale di Monza, Italy. It was the tenth round of the 2004 International Formula 3000 Championship, and was held in support of the 2004 Italian Grand Prix.

== Classification ==
=== Qualifying ===
Pos.	No.	Driver	Team	Time	Gap	Grid
1	1	(Italy) Vitantonio Liuzzi	Arden International	1:38.647		1
2	11	(Italy) Raffaele Giammaria	Team Astromega	1:39.062	+0.415	2
3	2	(Monaco) Robert Doornbos	Arden International	1:39.203	+0.556	3
4	3	(Argentina) José María López	CMS Performance	1:39.268	+0.621	4
5	7	(Austria) Patrick Friesacher	Coloni Motorsport	1:39.288	+0.641	5
6	17	(Czech Republic) Tomáš Enge	Ma-Con Engineering	1:39.394	+0.747	6
7	15	(Argentina) Esteban Guerrieri	BCN Competicion	1:39.850	+1.203	7
8	16	(Germany) Tony Schmidt	Ma-Con Engineering	1:39.889	+1.242	8
9	14	(Italy) Enrico Toccacelo	BCN Competicion	1:39.984	+1.337	9
10	18	(Italy) Matteo Grassotto	AEZ Racing	1:40.012	+1.365	10
11	19	(Italy) Ferdinando Monfardini	AEZ Racing	1:40.130	+1.483	11
12	5	(Italy) Michele Rugolo	Durango	1:40.357	+1.710	12
13	9	(Belgium) Jeffrey van Hooydonk	Super Nova Racing	1:40.452	+1.805	13
14	4	(Austria) Mathias Lauda	CMS Performance	1:40.542	+1.895	14
15	6	(Venezuela) Ernesto Viso	Durango	1:41.046	+2.399	15
16	10	(Turkey) Can Artam	Super Nova Racing	1:41.476	+2.829	16
17	12	(Netherlands) Olivier Tielemans	Team Astromega	1:42.116	+3.469	17
18	8	(Israel) Chanoch Nissany	Coloni Motorsport	1:43.800	+5.153	18
Lähde:

=== Race ===
Pos	No	Driver	Team	Laps	Time/Retired	Grid	Points
1	1	(Italy) Vitantonio Liuzzi	Arden International	26	44:20.747	1	10
2	17	(Czech Republic) Tomáš Enge	Ma-Con Engineering	26	+9.412	6	8
3	2	(Monaco) Robert Doornbos	Arden International	26	+15.480	3	6
4	11	(Italy) Raffaele Giammaria	Team Astromega	26	+23.446	2	5
5	15	(Argentina) Esteban Guerrieri	BCN Competicion	26	+23.688	7	4
6	4	(Austria) Mathias Lauda	CMS Performance	26	+45.552	14	3
7	9	(Belgium) Jeffrey van Hooydonk	Super Nova Racing	26	+45.785	13	2
8	6	(Venezuela) Ernesto Viso	Durango	26	+1:07.860	15	1
9	10	(Turkey) Can Artam	Super Nova Racing	26	+1:42.646	16	
10	16	(Germany) Tony Schmidt	Ma-Con Engineering	25	DNF	8	
11	12	(Netherlands) Olivier Tielemans	Team Astromega	25	+1 lap	17	
12	8	(Israel) Chanoch Nissany	Coloni Motorsport	25	+1 lap	18	
Ret	19	(Italy) Ferdinando Monfardini	AEZ Racing	17	Retired	11	
Ret	7	(Austria) Patrick Friesacher	Coloni Motorsport	17	Retired	5	
Ret	3	(Argentina) José María López	CMS Performance	2	Retired	4	
Ret	18	(Italy) Matteo Grassotto	AEZ Racing	2	Retired	10	
Ret	14	(Italy) Enrico Toccacelo	BCN Competicion	0	Retired	9	
Ret	5	(Italy) Michele Rugolo	Durango	0	Retired	12	
Lähde:

== Standings after the event ==
Drivers' Championship standings

	Pos.	Driver	Points
	1	(Italy) Vitantonio Liuzzi	86
	2	(Italy) Enrico Toccacelo	56
	3	(Monaco) Robert Doornbos	44
1	4	(Czech Republic) Tomáš Enge	38
1	5	(Austria) Patrick Friesacher	33

Teams' Championship standings

	Pos.	Team	Points
	1	(United Kingdom) Arden International	130
	2	(Spain) BCN Competicion	84
	3	(Germany) Ma-Con Engineering	49
1	4	(Italy) CMS Performance	33
1	5	(Italy) Coloni Motorsport	30

- Note: Only the top five positions are included for both sets of standings.

== See also ==
- 2004 Italian Grand Prix

Previous round: 2004 Spa-Francorchamps F3000 round	International Formula 3000 Championship; 2004 season	Next round: 2005 Imola GP2 Series round
Previous round: 2003 Monza F3000 round	Monza F3000 round	Next round: 2005 Monza GP2 Series round
