= 2004 Spa-Francorchamps F3000 round =

- Race 9 of 10 in the 2004 International Formula 3000 Championship
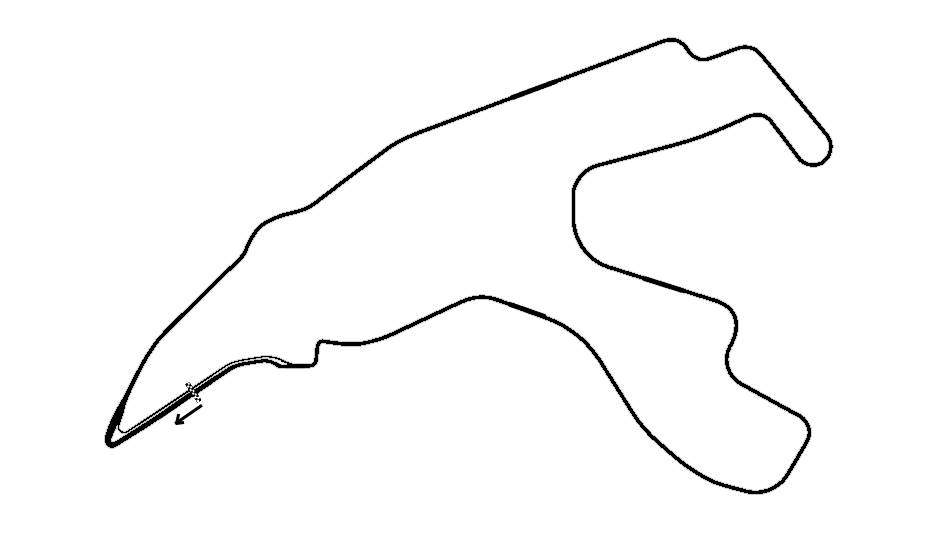

Race details
- Date: 28 August 2004
- Location: Circuit de Spa-Francorchamps, Francorchamps, Wallonia, Belgium
- Course: Permanent racing facility
- Course length: 6.976 km (4.335 miles)
- Distance: 22 laps, 153.296 km (95.260 miles)

Pole position
Driver	(Italy) Vitantonio Liuzzi	Arden International
- Time: 2:06.896

Fastest lap
Driver	(Monaco) Robert Doornbos	Arden International
- Time: 2:29.524 on lap 21

Podium
First	(Monaco) Robert Doornbos	Arden International
Second	(Italy) Vitantonio Liuzzi	Arden International
Third	(Argentina) José María López	CMS Performance

The 2004 Spa-Francorchamps F3000 round was a motor racing event held on 28 August 2004 at the Circuit de Spa-Francorchamps, Belgium. It was the ninth round of the 2004 International Formula 3000 Championship, and was held in support of the 2004 Belgian Grand Prix.

== Classification ==
=== Qualifying ===
Pos.	No.	Driver	Team	Time	Gap	Grid
1	1	(Italy) Vitantonio Liuzzi	Arden International	2:06.896		1
2	2	(Monaco) Robert Doornbos	Arden International	2:06.969	+0.073	2
3	17	(Czech Republic) Tomáš Enge	Ma-Con Engineering	2:07.470	+0.574	3
4	3	(Argentina) José María López	CMS Performance	2:07.718	+0.822	4
5	15	(Argentina) Esteban Guerrieri	BCN Competicion	2:07.824	+0.928	5
6	18	(Italy) Matteo Grassotto	AEZ Racing	2:08.010	+1.114	6
7	14	(Italy) Enrico Toccacelo	BCN Competicion	2:08.052	+1.156	7
8	16	(Germany) Tony Schmidt	Ma-Con Engineering	2:08.656	+1.760	8
9	4	(Austria) Mathias Lauda	CMS Performance	2:08.666	+1.770	9
10	7	(Austria) Patrick Friesacher	Coloni Motorsport	2:08.844	+1.948	10
11	19	(Italy) Ferdinando Monfardini	AEZ Racing	2:09.127	+2.231	11
12	6	(Venezuela) Ernesto Viso	Durango	2:09.238	+2.342	12
13	9	(Belgium) Jeffrey van Hooydonk	Super Nova Racing	2:09.562	+2.666	13
14	11	(Belgium) Nico Verdonck	Team Astromega	2:09.834	+2.938	14
15	10	(Turkey) Can Artam	Super Nova Racing	2:10.179	+3.283	15
16	8	(Israel) Chanoch Nissany	Coloni Motorsport	2:14.866	+7.970	16
17	5	(Italy) Matteo Meneghello	Durango	2:15.166	+8.270	17
18	12	(Netherlands) Olivier Tielemans	Team Astromega	No time		18
Lähde:

=== Race ===
Pos	No	Driver	Team	Laps	Time/Retired	Grid	Points
1	2	(Monaco) Robert Doornbos	Arden International	22	58:14.019	2	10
2	1	(Italy) Vitantonio Liuzzi	Arden International	22	+27.877	1	8
3	3	(Argentina) José María López	CMS Performance	22	+29.319	4	6
4	17	(Czech Republic) Tomáš Enge	Ma-Con Engineering	22	+38.368	3	5
5	7	(Austria) Patrick Friesacher	Coloni Motorsport	22	+38.494	10	4
6	16	(Germany) Tony Schmidt	Ma-Con Engineering	22	+56.876	8	3
7	15	(Argentina) Esteban Guerrieri	BCN Competicion	22	+58.621	5	2
8	18	(Italy) Matteo Grassotto	AEZ Racing	22	+1:06.870	6	1
9	9	(Belgium) Jeffrey van Hooydonk	Super Nova Racing	22	+1:09.762	13	
10	6	(Venezuela) Ernesto Viso	Durango	22	+1:37.353	12	
11	11	(Belgium) Nico Verdonck	Team Astromega	22	+1:38.531	14	
12	14	(Italy) Enrico Toccacelo	BCN Competicion	22	+1:44.291	7	
13	10	(Turkey) Can Artam	Super Nova Racing	22	+1:55.136	15	
14	4	(Austria) Mathias Lauda	CMS Performance	22	+1:59.448	9	
15	5	(Italy) Matteo Meneghello	Durango	22	+2:17.143	17	
16	19	(Italy) Ferdinando Monfardini	AEZ Racing	21	+1 lap	11	
Ret	8	(Israel) Chanoch Nissany	Coloni Motorsport	7	Retired	16	
Ret	12	(Netherlands) Olivier Tielemans	Team Astromega	6	Retired	18	
Lähde:

== Standings after the event ==
Drivers' Championship standings

	Pos.	Driver	Points
	1	(Italy) Vitantonio Liuzzi	76
	2	(Italy) Enrico Toccacelo	56
1	3	(Monaco) Robert Doornbos	38
1	4	(Austria) Patrick Friesacher	33
	5	(Czech Republic) Tomáš Enge	30

Teams' Championship standings

Pos.	Team	Points
1	(United Kingdom) Arden International	114
2	(Spain) BCN Competicion	80
3	(Germany) Ma-Con Engineering	41
4	(Italy) Coloni Motorsport	30
5	(Italy) CMS Performance	30

- Note: Only the top five positions are included for both sets of standings.

== See also ==
- 2004 Belgian Grand Prix

Previous round: 2004 Hungaroring F3000 round	International Formula 3000 Championship; 2004 season	Next round: 2004 Monza F3000 round
Previous round: 2002 Spa-Francorchamps F3000 round	Spa-Francorchamps F3000 round	Next round: 2005 Spa-Francorchamps GP2 Series round
