= 2004 Hungaroring F3000 round =

- Race 8 of 10 in the 2004 International Formula 3000 Championship

Race details
- Date: 14 August 2004
- Location: Hungaroring, Mogyoród, Pest, Hungary
- Course: Permanent racing facility
- Course length: 4.381 km (2.722 miles)
- Distance: 35 laps, 153.440 km (95.347 miles)

Pole position
| Driver | (Italy) Vitantonio Liuzzi | Arden International |
- Time: 1:35.003

Fastest lap
| Driver | (Czech Republic) Tomáš Enge | Ma-Con Engineering |
- Time: 1:37.927 on lap 34

Podium
| First | (Austria) Patrick Friesacher | Coloni Motorsport |
| Second | (Italy) Vitantonio Liuzzi | Arden International |
| Third | (Italy) Enrico Toccacelo | BCN Competicion |

The 2004 Hungaroring F3000 round was a motor racing event held on 14 August 2004 at the Hungaroring, Mogyoród, Hungary. It was the eighth round of the 2004 International Formula 3000 Championship, and was held in support of the 2004 Hungarian Grand Prix.

== Classification ==
=== Qualifying ===
| Pos. | No. | Driver | Team | Time | Gap | Grid |
|---|---|---|---|---|---|---|
| 1 | 1 | (Italy) Vitantonio Liuzzi | Arden International | 1:35.003 | | 1 |
| 2 | 14 | (Italy) Enrico Toccacelo | BCN Competicion | 1:35.305 | +0.302 | 2 |
| 3 | 7 | (Austria) Patrick Friesacher | Coloni Motorsport | 1:35.460 | +0.457 | 3 |
| 4 | 17 | (Czech Republic) Tomáš Enge | Ma-Con Engineering | 1:35.537 | +0.534 | 4 |
| 5 | 2 | (Monaco) Robert Doornbos | Arden International | 1:35.762 | +0.759 | 5 |
| 6 | 6 | (Venezuela) Ernesto Viso | Durango | 1:35.804 | +0.801 | 6 |
| 7 | 15 | (Argentina) Esteban Guerrieri | BCN Competicion | 1:36.038 | +1.035 | 7 |
| 8 | 18 | (Italy) Raffaele Giammaria | AEZ Racing | 1:36.455 | +1.452 | 8 |
| 9 | 5 | (France) Yannick Schroeder | Durango | 1:36.499 | +1.496 | 9 |
| 10 | 16 | (Germany) Tony Schmidt | Ma-Con Engineering | 1:36.582 | +1.579 | 10 |
| 11 | 3 | (Argentina) José María López | CMS Performance | 1:36.594 | +1.591 | 11 |
| 12 | 19 | (Italy) Ferdinando Monfardini | AEZ Racing | 1:36.988 | +1.985 | 12 |
| 13 | 9 | (Belgium) Jeffrey van Hooydonk | Super Nova Racing | 1:37.029 | +2.026 | 13 |
| 14 | 4 | (Austria) Mathias Lauda | CMS Performance | 1:37.428 | +2.425 | 14 |
| 15 | 10 | (Turkey) Can Artam | Super Nova Racing | 1:38.062 | +3.059 | 15 |
| 16 | 11 | (Belgium) Nico Verdonck | Team Astromega | 1:38.396 | +3.393 | 16 |
| 17 | 8 | (Israel) Chanoch Nissany | Coloni Motorsport | 1:39.162 | +4.159 | 17 |
| 18 | 12 | (Netherlands) Olivier Tielemans | Team Astromega | 1:40.206 | +5.203 | 18 |
Lähde:

=== Race ===
| Pos | No | Driver | Team | Laps | Time/Retired | Grid | Points |
|---|---|---|---|---|---|---|---|
| 1 | 7 | (Austria) Patrick Friesacher | Coloni Motorsport | 35 | 1:08.38.544 | 3 | 10 |
| 2 | 1 | (Italy) Vitantonio Liuzzi | Arden International | 35 | +2.513 | 1 | 8 |
| 3 | 14 | (Italy) Enrico Toccacelo | BCN Competicion | 35 | +20.188 | 2 | 6 |
| 4 | 17 | (Czech Republic) Tomáš Enge | Ma-Con Engineering | 35 | +21.543 | 4 | 5 |
| 5 | 15 | (Argentina) Esteban Guerrieri | BCN Competicion | 35 | +42.359 | 7 | 4 |
| 6 | 6 | (Venezuela) Ernesto Viso | Durango | 35 | +48.551 | 6 | 3 |
| 7 | 2 | (Monaco) Robert Doornbos | Arden International | 35 | +1:01.456 | 5 | 2 |
| 8 | 3 | (Argentina) José María López | CMS Performance | 35 | +1:17.992 | 11 | 1 |
| 9 | 9 | (Belgium) Jeffrey van Hooydonk | Super Nova Racing | 35 | +1:33.366 | 13 | |
| 10 | 18 | (Italy) Raffaele Giammaria | AEZ Racing | 35 | +1:35.593 | 8 | |
| 11 | 16 | (Germany) Tony Schmidt | Ma-Con Engineering | 35 | +1:38.527 | 10 | |
| 12 | 11 | (Belgium) Nico Verdonck | Team Astromega | 34 | +1 lap | 16 | |
| 13 | 19 | (Italy) Ferdinando Monfardini | AEZ Racing | 34 | +1 lap | 12 | |
| 14 | 10 | (Turkey) Can Artam | Super Nova Racing | 34 | +1 lap | 15 | |
| 15 | 12 | (Netherlands) Olivier Tielemans | Team Astromega | 33 | +2 laps | 18 | |
| 16 | 4 | (Austria) Mathias Lauda | CMS Performance | 31 | DNF | 14 | |
| Ret | 8 | (Israel) Chanoch Nissany | Coloni Motorsport | 23 | Retired | 17 | |
| Ret | 5 | (France) Yannick Schroeder | Durango | 13 | Retired | 9 | |
Lähde:

== Standings after the event ==
Drivers' Championship standings

| | Pos. | Driver | Points |
|---|---|---|---|
| | 1 | (Italy) Vitantonio Liuzzi | 68 |
| | 2 | (Italy) Enrico Toccacelo | 56 |
| 4 | 3 | (Austria) Patrick Friesacher | 29 |
| 1 | 4 | (Monaco) Robert Doornbos | 28 |
| 1 | 5 | (Czech Republic) Tomáš Enge | 25 |

Teams' Championship standings

| | Pos. | Team | Points |
|---|---|---|---|
| | 1 | (United Kingdom) Arden International | 96 |
| | 2 | (Spain) BCN Competicion | 78 |
| | 3 | (Germany) Ma-Con Engineering | 33 |
| 3 | 4 | (Italy) Coloni Motorsport | 26 |
| 1 | 5 | (Italy) CMS Performance | 24 |

- Note: Only the top five positions are included for both sets of standings.

== See also ==
- 2004 Hungarian Grand Prix

| Previous round: 2004 Hockenheimring F3000 round | International Formula 3000 Championship; 2004 season | Next round: 2004 Spa-Francorchamps F3000 round |
| Previous round: 2003 Hungaroring F3000 round | Hungaroring F3000 round | Next round: 2005 Hungaroring GP2 Series round |
