= 2004 Nürburgring F3000 round =

- Race 4 of 10 in the 2004 International Formula 3000 Championship

Race details
- Date: 29 May 2004
- Location: Nürburgring, Nürburg, Germany
- Course: Permanent racing facility
- Course length: 5.148 km (3.199 miles)
- Distance: 30 laps, 154.423 km (95.958 miles)

Pole position
Driver	(Italy) Vitantonio Liuzzi	Arden International
- Time: 1:47.734

Fastest lap
Driver	(Argentina) José María López	CMS Performance
- Time: 1:49.453 on lap 11

Podium
First	(Italy) Enrico Toccacelo	BCN Competicion
Second	(Monaco) Robert Doornbos	Arden International
Third	(France) Yannick Schroeder	Durango

The 2004 Nürburgring F3000 round was a motor racing event held on 29 May 2004 at the Nürburgring, Germany. It was the fourth round of the 2004 International Formula 3000 Championship, and was held in support of the 2004 European Grand Prix.

== Classification ==
=== Qualifying ===
Pos.	No.	Driver	Team	Time	Gap	Grid
1	1	(Italy) Vitantonio Liuzzi	Arden International	1:47.734		1
2	14	(Italy) Enrico Toccacelo	BCN Competicion	1:48.082	+0.348	2
3	17	(Czech Republic) Tomáš Enge	Ma-Con Engineering	1:48.215	+0.481	3
4	3	(Argentina) José María López	CMS Performance	1:48.298	+0.564	4
5	9	(Belgium) Jeffrey van Hooydonk	Super Nova Racing	1:48.437	+0.703	5
6	18	(Italy) Raffaele Giammaria	AEZ Racing	1:48.555	+0.821	6
7	15	(Argentina) Esteban Guerrieri	BCN Competicion	1:48.743	+1.009	7
8	2	(Monaco) Robert Doornbos	Arden International	1:48.854	+1.120	8
9	5	(France) Yannick Schroeder	Durango	1:48.903	+1.169	9
10	7	(Austria) Patrick Friesacher	Coloni Motorsport	1:49.071	+1.337	10
11	12	(Belgium) Jan Heylen	Team Astromega	1:49.350	+1.616	11
12	16	(Germany) Tony Schmidt	Ma-Con Engineering	1:49.377	+1.643	12
13	10	(South Africa) Alan van der Merwe	Super Nova Racing	1:49.498	+1.764	13
14	11	(Belgium) Nico Verdonck	Team Astromega	1:49.884	+2.150	14
15	4	(Austria) Mathias Lauda	CMS Performance	1:50.002	+2.268	15
16	6	(Brazil) Rodrigo Ribeiro	Durango	1:50.335	+2.601	16
17	8	(Turkey) Can Artam	Coloni Motorsport	1:50.395	+2.661	17
18	19	(Italy) Ferdinando Monfardini	AEZ Racing	1:50.814	+3.080	18
Lähde:

=== Race ===
Pos	No	Driver	Team	Laps	Time/Retired	Grid	Points
1	14	(Italy) Enrico Toccacelo	BCN Competicion	30	56:22.535	2	10
2	2	(Monaco) Robert Doornbos	Arden International	30	+9.957	8	8
3	5	(France) Yannick Schroeder	Durango	30	+10.583	9	6
4	15	(Argentina) Esteban Guerrieri	BCN Competicion	30	+12.230	7	5
5	3	(Argentina) José María López	CMS Performance	30	+12.375	4	4
6	18	(Italy) Raffaele Giammaria	AEZ Racing	30	+12.782	6	3
7	17	(Czech Republic) Tomáš Enge	Ma-Con Engineering	30	+14.962	3	2
8	7	(Belgium) Jeffrey van Hooydonk	Coloni Motorsport	30	+30.386	5	1
9	12	(Belgium) Jan Heylen	Team Astromega	30	+31.362	11	
10	4	(Austria) Mathias Lauda	CMS Performance	30	+39.204	15	
11	1	(Italy) Vitantonio Liuzzi	Arden International	30	+39.548	1	
12	11	(Belgium) Nico Verdonck	Team Astromega	30	+42.042	14	
13	8	(Turkey) Can Artam	Coloni Motorsport	30	+1:26.548	17	
14	16	(Germany) Tony Schmidt	Ma-Con Engineering	30	+1.26.691	12	
15	19	(Italy) Ferdinando Monfardini	AEZ Racing	30	+1:29.837	18	
16	6	(Brazil) Rodrigo Ribeiro	Durango	29	+1 lap	16	
Ret	10	(South Africa) Alan van der Merwe	Super Nova Racing	18	Retired	13	
Ret	9	(Austria) Patrick Friesacher	Super Nova Racing	15	Retired	10	
Lähde:

== Standings after the event ==
Drivers' Championship standings

	Pos.	Driver	Points
1	1	(Italy) Enrico Toccacelo	34
1	2	(Italy) Vitantonio Liuzzi	30
	3	(Italy) Raffaele Gianmaria	19
	4	(Monaco) Robert Doornbos	17
	5	(Argentina) José María López	13

Teams' Championship standings

Pos.	Team	Points
1	(United Kingdom) Arden International	47
2	(Spain) BCN Competicion	43
3	(Italy) AEZ Racing	19
4	(Italy) CMS Performance	15
5	(United Kingdom) Super Nova Racing	10

- Note: Only the top five positions are included for both sets of standings.

== See also ==
- 2004 European Grand Prix

Previous round: 2004 Monaco F3000 round	International Formula 3000 Championship; 2004 season	Next round: 2004 Magny-Cours F3000 round
Previous round: 2003 Nürburgring F3000 round	Nürburgring F3000 round	Next round: 2005 Nürburgring GP2 Series round
