= 2004 Barcelona F3000 round =

- Race 2 of 10 in the 2004 International Formula 3000 Championship

Race details
- Date: 8 May 2004
- Location: Circuit de Catalunya, Montmeló, Catalonia, Spain
- Course: Permanent racing facility
- Course length: 4.627 km (2.875 miles)
- Distance: 33 laps, 148.064 km (92.006 miles)

Pole position
Driver	(Italy) Enrico Toccacelo	BCN Competicion
- Time: 1:32.300

Fastest lap
Driver	(Italy) Vitantonio Liuzzi	Arden International
- Time: 1:34.233 on lap 2

Podium
First	(Italy) Vitantonio Liuzzi	Arden International
Second	(Italy) Enrico Toccacelo	BCN Competicion
Third	(Italy) Raffaele Giammaria	AEZ Racing

The 2004 Barcelona F3000 round was a motor racing event held on 8 May 2004 at the Circuit de Catalunya, Spanish. It was the second round of the 2004 International Formula 3000 Championship, and was held in support of the 2004 Spanish Grand Prix.

== Race report ==
Enrico Toccacelo claimed his first pole position in qualifying, having set his lap early in the session before rain started to fall, with Vitantonio Liuzzi joining him on the front row.

Liuzzi, who had saved a set of new tyres for the race, made the better start and overtook Toccaleco before turn one. Liuzzi's teammate Robert Doornbos struggled with the handling of his car, however, and fell down the order, ultimately retiring three laps before the end of the race. On lap eighteen, Yannick Schroeder collided with Tomáš Enge, with both drivers retiring from the race.

A four-way battle for third place ensued after the mandatory pitstops. Jeffrey van Hooydonk led the group, with the faster Alan van der Merwe behind him, followed by Raffaele Giammaria and Patrick Friesacher. Giammaria passed van der Merwe for fourth, but lost the position a few laps later. Van der Merwe then made a move on van Hooydonk for third, but the two collided, leaving van Hooydonk stranded in the gravel. Van der Merwe had to change his front wing and therefore fell out of the points positions too, giving third place to Giammaria.

Liuzzi took his second consecutive win, giving him a lead of four points in the championship, with Toccacelo and Giammaria joining him on the podium.

== Classification ==
=== Qualifying ===
Pos.	No.	Driver	Team	Time	Gap	Grid
1	14	(Italy) Enrico Toccacelo	BCN Competicion	1:32.300		1
2	1	(Italy) Vitantonio Liuzzi	Arden International	1:32.590	+0.290	2
3	5	(France) Yannick Schroeder	Durango	1:32.664	+0.364	3
4	2	(Monaco) Robert Doornbos	Arden International	1:32.667	+0.367	4
5	10	(South Africa) Alan van der Merwe	Super Nova Racing	1:32.794	+0.494	5
6	17	(Czech Republic) Tomáš Enge	Ma-Con Engineering	1:32.922	+0.622	6
7	3	(Argentina) José María López	CMS Performance	1:32.959	+0.659	7
8	9	(Belgium) Jeffrey van Hooydonk	Super Nova Racing	1:33.003	+0.703	8
9	7	(Austria) Patrick Friesacher	Coloni Motorsport	1:33.082	+0.782	9
10	18	(Italy) Raffaele Giammaria	AEZ Racing	1:33.161	+0.861	10
11	15	(Argentina) Esteban Guerrieri	BCN Competicion	1:33.351	+1.051	11
12	4	(Austria) Mathias Lauda	CMS Performance	1:33.448	+1.148	12
13	12	(Belgium) Jan Heylen	Team Astromega	1:33.466	+1.166	13
14	11	(Belgium) Nico Verdonck	Team Astromega	1:34.346	+2.046	14
15	19	(Italy) Ferdinando Monfardini	AEZ Racing	1:34.572	+2.272	15
16	6	(Brazil) Rodrigo Ribeiro	Durango	1:34.633	+2.333	16
17	8	(Turkey) Can Artam	Coloni Motorsport	1:35.077	+2.777	17
18	16	(Germany) Tony Schmidt	Ma-Con Engineering			18

=== Race ===
Pos	No	Driver	Team	Laps	Time/Retired	Grid	Points
1	1	(Italy) Vitantonio Liuzzi	Arden International	33	53:22.107	2	10
2	14	(Italy) Enrico Toccacelo	BCN Competicion	33	+11.664	1	8
3	18	(Italy) Raffaele Giammaria	AEZ Racing	33	+49.014	10	6
4	9	(Austria) Patrick Friesacher	Super Nova Racing	33	+52.595	9	5
5	15	(Argentina) Esteban Guerrieri	BCN Competicion	33	+52.977	11	4
6	3	(Argentina) José María López	CMS Performance	33	+56.049	7	3
7	4	(Austria) Mathias Lauda	CMS Performance	33	+1:05.295	12	2
8	6	(Brazil) Rodrigo Ribeiro	Durango	33	+1:17.517	16	1
9	11	(Belgium) Nico Verdonck	Team Astromega	33	+1.18.174	14	
10	8	(Turkey) Can Artam	Coloni Motorsport	33	+1:26.812	17	
11	12	(Belgium) Jan Heylen	Team Astromega	33	+1:30.546	13	
12	10	(South Africa) Alan van der Merwe	Super Nova Racing	32	+1 lap	5	
13	19	(Italy) Ferdinando Monfardini	AEZ Racing	32	+1 lap	15	
14	2	(Monaco) Robert Doornbos	Arden International	30	+3 laps	4	
Ret	7	(Belgium) Jeffrey van Hooydonk	Coloni Motorsport	28	Retired	8	
Ret	17	(Czech Republic) Tomáš Enge	Ma-Con Engineering	18	Retired	6	
Ret	5	(France) Yannick Schroeder	Durango	18	Retired	3	
DNQ	16	(Germany) Tony Schmidt	Ma-Con Engineering	0	107% rule	18	

== Standings after the event ==
Drivers' Championship standings

	Pos.	Driver	Points
	1	(Italy) Vitantonio Liuzzi	20
	2	(Italy) Enrico Toccacelo	16
1	3	(Italy) Raffaele Gianmaria	11
1	4	(Monaco) Robert Doornbos	6
4	5	(Austria) Patrick Friesacher	5

Teams' Championship standings

	Pos.	Team	Points
	1	(United Kingdom) Arden International	26
	2	(Spain) BCN Competicion	20
	3	(Italy) AEZ Racing	11
3	4	(United Kingdom) Super Nova Racing	6
	5	(Italy) CMS Performance	5

- Note: Only the top five positions are included for both sets of standings.

== See also ==
- 2004 Spanish Grand Prix

Previous round: 2004 Imola F3000 round	International Formula 3000 Championship; 2004 season	Next round: 2004 Monaco F3000 round
Previous round: 2003 Barcelona F3000 round	Barcelona F3000 round	Next round: 2005 Catalunya GP2 Series round
