= 2004 Imola F3000 round =

- Race 1 of 10 in the 2004 International Formula 3000 Championship

Race details
- Date: 24 April 2004
- Location: Autodromo Enzo e Dino Ferrari, Imola, Emilia-Romagna, Italy
- Course: Permanent racing facility
- Course length: 4.933 km (3.065 miles)
- Distance: 31 laps, 152.686 km (94.879 miles)

Pole position
Driver	(Italy) Vitantonio Liuzzi	Arden International
- Time: 1:38.153

Fastest lap
Driver	(Argentina) José María López	CMS Performance
- Time: 1:39.847 on lap 17

Podium
First	(Italy) Vitantonio Liuzzi	Arden International
Second	(Italy) Enrico Toccacelo	BCN Competicion
Third	(Monaco) Robert Doornbos	Arden International

The 2004 Imola F3000 round was a motor racing event held on 24 April 2004 at the Autodromo Enzo e Dino Ferrari, Imola. It was the first round of the 2004 International Formula 3000 Championship, and was held in support of the 2004 San Marino Grand Prix.

== Classification ==
=== Qualifying ===
Pos.	No.	Driver	Team	Time	Gap	Grid
1	1	(Italy) Vitantonio Liuzzi	Arden International	1:38.153		1
2	14	(Italy) Enrico Toccacelo	BCN Competicion	1:38.725	+0.572	2
3	7	(Belgium) Jeffrey van Hooydonk	Coloni Motorsport	1:38.832	+0.679	3
4	3	(Argentina) José María López	CMS Performance	1:39.214	+1.061	4
5	17	(Czech Republic) Tomáš Enge	Ma-Con Engineering	1:39.321	+1.168	5
6	2	(Monaco) Robert Doornbos	Arden International	1:39.388	+1.235	6
7	18	(Italy) Raffaele Giammaria	AEZ Racing	1:39.453	+1.340	7
8	9	(Austria) Patrick Friesacher	Super Nova Racing	1:39.508	+1.355	8
9	5	(France) Yannick Schroeder	Durango	1:39.768	+1.615	9
10	15	(Argentina) Esteban Guerrieri	BCN Competicion	1:39.800	+1.647	10
11	16	(Germany) Tony Schmidt	Ma-Con Engineering	1:39.847	+1.694	11
12	10	(South Africa) Alan van der Merwe	Super Nova Racing	1:39.900	+1.747	12
13	12	(Belgium) Jan Heylen	Team Astromega	1:40.153	+2.000	13
14	6	(Brazil) Rodrigo Ribeiro	Durango	1:40.343	+2.190	14
15	4	(Austria) Mathias Lauda	CMS Performance	1:40.466	+2.313	15
16	11	(Belgium) Nico Verdonck	Team Astromega	1:40.762	+2.609	16
17	8	(Turkey) Can Artam	Coloni Motorsport	1:41.243	+3.090	17
18	19	(Italy) Ferdinando Monfardini	AEZ Racing	1:41.344	+3.191	18
Lähde:

=== Race ===
Pos	No	Driver	Team	Laps	Time/Retired	Grid	Points
1	1	(Italy) Vitantonio Liuzzi	Arden International	31	52:46.960	1	10
2	14	(Italy) Enrico Toccacelo	BCN Competicion	31	+8.853	2	8
3	2	(Monaco) Robert Doornbos	Arden International	31	+31.088	6	6
4	18	(Italy) Raffaele Giammaria	AEZ Racing	31	+33.505	7	5
5	17	(Czech Republic) Tomáš Enge	Ma-Con Engineering	31	+34.515	5	4
6	7	(Belgium) Jeffrey van Hooydonk	Coloni Motorsport	31	+44.061	3	3
7	5	(France) Yannick Schroeder	Durango	31	+45.822	9	2
8	10	(South Africa) Alan van der Merwe	Super Nova Racing	31	+46.037	12	1
9	9	(Austria) Patrick Friesacher	Super Nova Racing	31	+46.361	8	
10	16	(Germany) Tony Schmidt	Ma-Con Engineering	31	+59.158	11	
11	12	(Belgium) Jan Heylen	Team Astromega	31	+1:14.991	13	
12	4	(Austria) Mathias Lauda	CMS Performance	31	+1:27.143	15	
13	6	(Brazil) Rodrigo Ribeiro	Durango	31	+1:39.200	14	
14	19	(Italy) Ferdinando Monfardini	AEZ Racing	30	+1 lap	18	
15	11	(Belgium) Nico Verdonck	Team Astromega	30	+1 lap	16	
Ret	3	(Argentina) José María López	CMS Performance	17	Retired	4	
Ret	15	(Argentina) Esteban Guerrieri	BCN Competicion	10	Retired	10	
Ret	8	(Turkey) Can Artam	Coloni Motorsport	3	Retired	17	
Lähde:

== Standings after the event ==
Drivers' Championship standings

Pos.	Driver	Points
1	(Italy) Vitantonio Liuzzi	10
2	(Italy) Enrico Toccacelo	8
3	(Monaco) Robert Doornbos	6
4	(Italy) Raffaele Giammaria	5
5	(Czech Republic) Tomáš Enge	4

Teams' Championship standings

Pos.	Team	Points
1	(United Kingdom) Arden International	16
2	(Spain) BCN Competicion	8
3	(Italy) AEZ Racing	5
4	(Germany) Ma-Con Engineering	4
5	(Italy) Coloni Motorsport	3

- Note: Only the top five positions are included for both sets of standings.

== See also ==
- 2004 San Marino Grand Prix

Previous round: 2003 Monza F3000 round	International Formula 3000 Championship; 2004 season	Next round: 2004 Barcelona F3000 round
Previous round: 2003 Imola F3000 round	Imola F3000 round	Next round: 2005 Imola GP2 Series round
