= 2004 Monaco F3000 round =

- Race 3 of 10 in the 2004 International Formula 3000 Championship

Race details
- Date: 22 May 2004
- Location: Circuit de Monaco, Monaco
- Course: Street circuit
- Course length: 3.340 km (2.075 miles)
- Distance: 45 laps, 150.300 km (93.396 miles)

Pole position
Driver	(Italy) Vitantonio Liuzzi	Arden International
- Time: 1:25.619

Fastest lap
Driver	(Czech Republic) Tomáš Enge	Ma-Con Engineering
- Time: 1:36.911 on lap 41

Podium
First	(Italy) Vitantonio Liuzzi	Arden International
Second	(Italy) Enrico Toccacelo	BCN Competicion
Third	(Argentina) José María López	CMS Performance

The 2004 Monaco F3000 round was a motor racing event held on 22 May 2004 at the Circuit de Monaco, Monaco. It was the threth round of the 2004 International Formula 3000 Championship, and was held in support of the 2004 Monaco Grand Prix.

== Classification ==
=== Qualifying ===
Pos.	No.	Driver	Team	Time	Gap	Grid
1	1	(Italy) Vitantonio Liuzzi	Arden International	1:25.619		1
2	14	(Italy) Enrico Toccacelo	BCN Competicion	1:25.884	+0.265	2
3	3	(Argentina) José María López	CMS Performance	1:26.166	+0.547	3
4	9	(Belgium) Jeffrey van Hooydonk	Super Nova Racing	1:26.419	+0.800	4
5	2	(Monaco) Robert Doornbos	Arden International	1:26.606	+0.987	5
6	7	(Austria) Patrick Friesacher	Coloni Motorsport	1:26.656	+1.037	6
7	18	(Italy) Raffaele Giammaria	AEZ Racing	1:26.709	+1.090	7
8	17	(Czech Republic) Tomáš Enge	Ma-Con Engineering	1:26.859	+1.240	8
9	15	(Argentina) Esteban Guerrieri	BCN Competicion	1:27.101	+1.482	9
10	10	(South Africa) Alan van der Merwe	Super Nova Racing	1:27.364	+1.745	10
11	12	(Belgium) Jan Heylen	Team Astromega	1:27.445	+1.826	11
12	6	(Brazil) Rodrigo Ribeiro	Durango	1:28.076	+2.457	12
13	4	(Austria) Mathias Lauda	CMS Performance	1:28.107	+2.488	13
14	5	(France) Yannick Schroeder	Durango	1:28.201	+2.582	14
15	19	(Italy) Ferdinando Monfardini	AEZ Racing	1:28.349	+2.730	15
16	11	(Belgium) Nico Verdonck	Team Astromega	1:28.383	+2.764	16
17	16	(Germany) Tony Schmidt	Ma-Con Engineering	1:28.445	+2.826	17
18	8	(Turkey) Can Artam	Coloni Motorsport	1:29.564	+3.945	18
Lähde:

=== Race ===
Pos	No	Driver	Team	Laps	Time/Retired	Grid	Points
1	1	(Italy) Vitantonio Liuzzi	Arden International	45	1:08.07.431	1	10
2	14	(Italy) Enrico Toccacelo	BCN Competicion	45	+2.580	2	8
3	3	(Argentina) José María López	CMS Performance	45	+10.916	3	6
4	18	(Italy) Raffaele Giammaria	AEZ Racing	45	+28.852	7	5
5	9	(Austria) Patrick Friesacher	Super Nova Racing	45	+29.273	6	4
6	2	(Monaco) Robert Doornbos	Arden International	45	+45.853	5	3
7	7	(Belgium) Jeffrey van Hooydonk	Coloni Motorsport	45	+46.204	4	2
8	12	(Belgium) Jan Heylen	Team Astromega	45	+1:04.169	11	1
9	10	(South Africa) Alan van der Merwe	Super Nova Racing	45	+1:05.039	10	
10	5	(France) Yannick Schroeder	Durango	44	+1 lap	14	
11	17	(Germany) Tony Schmidt	Ma-Con Engineering	44	+1 lap	17	
12	11	(Belgium) Nico Verdonck	Team Astromega	44	+1 lap	16	
13	19	(Italy) Ferdinando Monfardini	AEZ Racing	44	+1 lap	15	
14	17	(Czech Republic) Tomáš Enge	Ma-Con Engineering	44	+1 lap	8	
Ret	6	(Brazil) Rodrigo Ribeiro	Durango	30	Retired	12	
Ret	4	(Austria) Mathias Lauda	CMS Performance	18	Retired	13	
Ret	8	(Turkey) Can Artam	Coloni Motorsport	1	Retired	18	
Ret	15	(Argentina) Esteban Guerrieri	BCN Competicion	0	Retired	9	
Lähde:

== Standings after the event ==
Drivers' Championship standings

	Pos.	Driver	Points
	1	(Italy) Vitantonio Liuzzi	30
	2	(Italy) Enrico Toccacelo	24
	3	(Italy) Raffaele Gianmaria	16
	4	(Monaco) Robert Doornbos	9
4	5	(Argentina) José María López	9

Teams' Championship standings

	Pos.	Team	Points
	1	(United Kingdom) Arden International	39
	2	(Spain) BCN Competicion	28
	3	(Italy) AEZ Racing	16
1	4	(Italy) CMS Performance	11
1	5	(United Kingdom) Super Nova Racing	10

- Note: Only the top five positions are included for both sets of standings.

== See also ==
- 2004 Monaco Grand Prix

Previous round: 2004 Barcelona F3000 round	International Formula 3000 Championship; 2004 season	Next round: 2004 Nürburgring F3000 round
Previous round: 2003 Monaco F3000 round	Monaco F3000 round	Next round: 2005 Monaco GP2 Series round
