= 2004 Magny-Cours F3000 round =

- Race 5 of 10 in the 2004 International Formula 3000 Championship

Race details
- Date: 3 July 2004
- Location: Circuit de Nevers Magny-Cours, Magny-Cours, France
- Course: Permanent racing facility
- Course length: 4.411 km (2.741 miles)
- Distance: 35 laps, 154.199 km (95.819 miles)

Pole position
Driver	(Italy) Vitantonio Liuzzi	Arden International
- Time: 1:30.273

Fastest lap
Driver	(Italy) Vitantonio Liuzzi	Arden International
- Time: 1:31.791 on lap 5

Podium
First	(Italy) Vitantonio Liuzzi	Arden International
Second	(Czech Republic) Tomáš Enge	Ma-Con Engineering
Third	(Austria) Patrick Friesacher	Coloni Motorsport

The 2004 Magny-Cours F3000 round was a motor racing event held on 3 July 2004 at the Circuit de Nevers Magny-Cours, France. It was the fiveth round of the 2004 International Formula 3000 Championship, and was held in support of the 2004 French Grand Prix.

== Classification ==
=== Qualifying ===
Pos.	No.	Driver	Team	Time	Gap	Grid
1	1	(Italy) Vitantonio Liuzzi	Arden International	1:30.273		1
2	5	(France) Yannick Schroeder	Durango	1:30.615	+0.342	2
3	7	(Austria) Patrick Friesacher	Coloni Motorsport	1:30.704	+0.431	3
4	2	(Monaco) Robert Doornbos	Arden International	1:30.706	+0.433	4
5	3	(Argentina) José María López	CMS Performance	1:30.709	+0.436	5
6	15	(Argentina) Esteban Guerrieri	BCN Competicion	1:30.733	+0.460	6
7	17	(Czech Republic) Tomáš Enge	Ma-Con Engineering	1:30.750	+0.477	7
8	14	(Italy) Enrico Toccacelo	BCN Competicion	1:30.852	+0.579	8
9	16	(Germany) Tony Schmidt	Ma-Con Engineering	1:31.032	+0.759	9
10	6	(Venezuela) Ernesto Viso	Durango	1:31.290	+1.017	10
11	4	(Austria) Mathias Lauda	CMS Performance	1:31.693	+1.420	11
12	19	(Italy) Ferdinando Monfardini	AEZ Racing	1:31.713	+1.440	12
13	9	(Belgium) Jeffrey van Hooydonk	Super Nova Racing	1:31.873	+1.600	13
14	18	(Italy) Raffaele Giammaria	AEZ Racing	1:32.045	+1.772	14
15	10	(South Africa) Alan van der Merwe	Super Nova Racing	1:32.096	+1.823	15
16	11	(Belgium) Nico Verdonck	Team Astromega	1:32.192	+1.919	16
17	8	(Turkey) Can Artam	Coloni Motorsport	1:33.640	+3.367	17
Lähde:

=== Race ===
Pos	No	Driver	Team	Laps	Time/Retired	Grid	Points
1	1	(Italy) Vitantonio Liuzzi	Arden International	35	56:18.071	1	10
2	17	(Czech Republic) Tomáš Enge	Ma-Con Engineering	35	+6.498	7	8
3	7	(Austria) Patrick Friesacher	Coloni Motorsport	35	+22.073	3	6
4	5	(France) Yannick Schroeder	Durango	35	+22.371	2	5
5	2	(Monaco) Robert Doornbos	Arden International	35	+24.416	4	4
6	15	(Argentina) Esteban Guerrieri	BCN Competicion	35	+37.476	6	3
7	16	(Germany) Tony Schmidt	Ma-Con Engineering	35	+38.170	9	2
8	6	(Venezuela) Ernesto Viso	Durango	35	+39.531	10	1
9	10	(South Africa) Alan van der Merwe	Super Nova Racing	35	+49.169	15	
10	19	(Italy) Ferdinando Monfardini	AEZ Racing	35	+55.709	12	
11	11	(Belgium) Nico Verdonck	Team Astromega	35	+56.111	16	
12	14	(Italy) Enrico Toccacelo	BCN Competicion	35	+1:00.326	8	
13	9	(Belgium) Jeffrey van Hooydonk	Super Nova Racing	35	+1:22.586	13	
14	18	(Italy) Raffaele Giammaria	AEZ Racing	32	+3 laps	14	
Ret	3	(Argentina) José María López	CMS Performance	22	Retired	5	
Ret	8	(Turkey) Can Artam	Coloni Motorsport	22	Retired	17	
Ret	4	(Austria) Mathias Lauda	CMS Performance	1	Retired	11	
Lähde:

== Standings after the event ==
Drivers' Championship standings

	Pos.	Driver	Points
1	1	(Italy) Vitantonio Liuzzi	40
1	2	(Italy) Enrico Toccacelo	34
1	3	(Monaco) Robert Doornbos	21
1	4	(Italy) Raffaele Gianmaria	19
1	5	(Austria) Patrick Friesacher	15

Teams' Championship standings

	Pos.	Team	Points
	1	(United Kingdom) Arden International	61
	2	(Spain) BCN Competicion	46
	3	(Italy) AEZ Racing	19
3	4	(Germany) Ma-Con Engineering	16
1	5	(Italy) Durango	15

- Note: Only the top five positions are included for both sets of standings.

== See also ==
- 2004 French Grand Prix

Previous round: 2004 Nürburgring F3000 round	International Formula 3000 Championship; 2004 season	Next round: 2004 Silverstone F3000 round
Previous round: 2003 Magny-Cours F3000 round	Magny-Cours F3000 round	Next round: 2005 Magny-Cours GP2 Series round
