= 2004 Silverstone F3000 round =

- Race 6 of 10 in the 2004 International Formula 3000 Championship
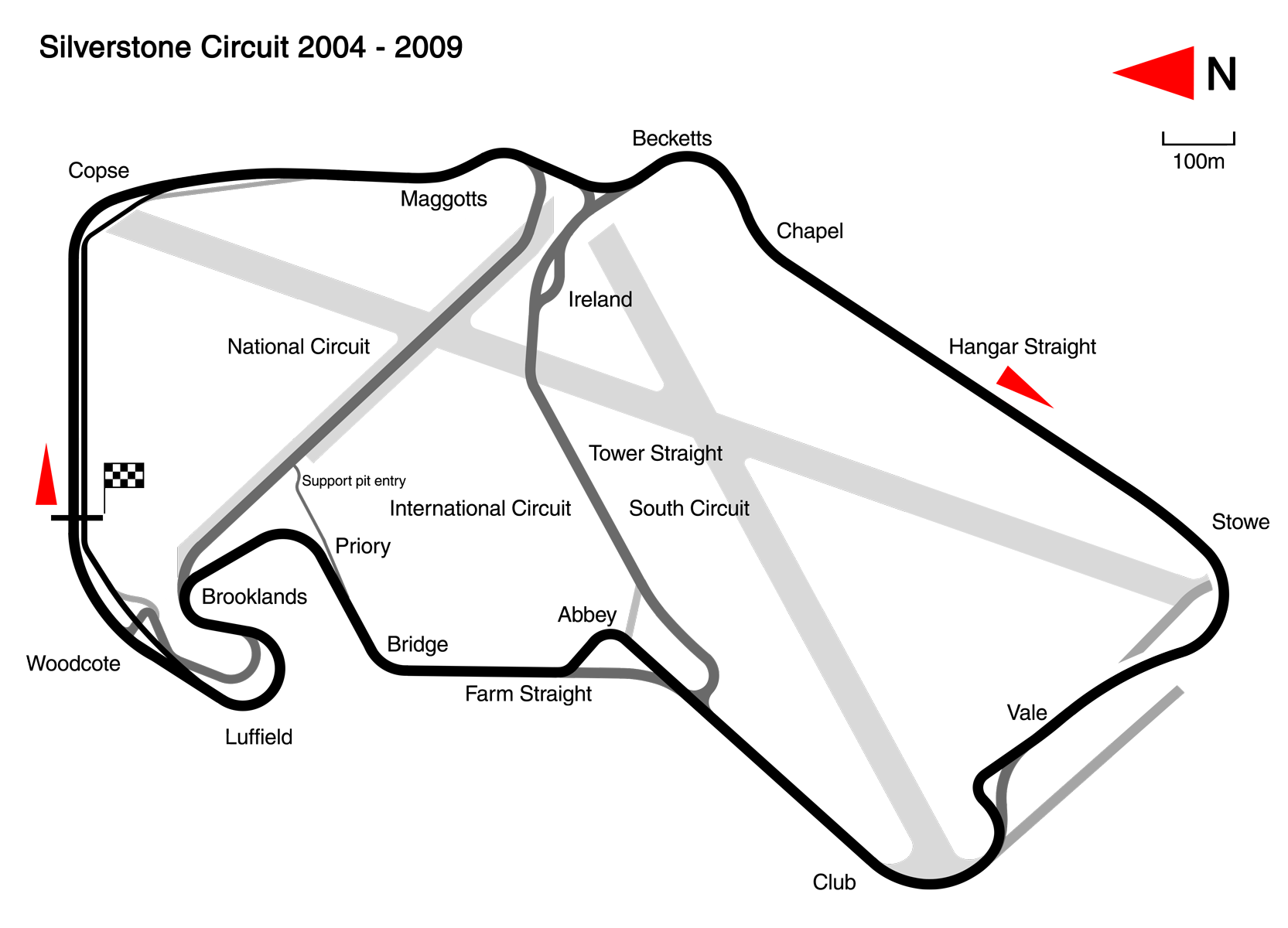

Race details
- Date: 10 July 2004
- Location: Silverstone Circuit, Silverstone, Northamptonshire and Buckinghamshire, England
- Course: Permanent racing facility
- Course length: 5.141 km (3.194 miles)
- Distance: 30 laps, 154.126 km (95.773 miles)

Pole position
Driver	(Italy) Vitantonio Liuzzi	Arden International
- Time: 1:36.902

Fastest lap
Driver	(Czech Republic) Tomáš Enge	Ma-Con Engineering
- Time: 1:38.384 on lap 15

Podium
First	(Italy) Vitantonio Liuzzi	Arden International
Second	(Italy) Enrico Toccacelo	BCN Competicion
Third	(Czech Republic) Tomáš Enge	Ma-Con Engineering

The 2004 Silverstone F3000 round was a motor racing event held on 10 July 2004 at the Silverstone Circuit, United Kingdom. It was the sixth round of the 2004 International Formula 3000 Championship, and was held in support of the 2004 British Grand Prix.

== Classification ==
=== Qualifying ===
Pos.	No.	Driver	Team	Time	Gap	Grid
1	1	(Italy) Vitantonio Liuzzi	Arden International	1:36.902		1
2	14	(Italy) Enrico Toccacelo	BCN Competicion	1:36.984	+0.082	2
3	3	(Argentina) José María López	CMS Performance	1:37.212	+0.310	3
4	17	(Czech Republic) Tomáš Enge	Ma-Con Engineering	1:37.254	+0.352	4
5	7	(Austria) Patrick Friesacher	Coloni Motorsport	1:37.271	+0.369	5
6	18	(Italy) Raffaele Giammaria	AEZ Racing	1:37.498	+0.596	6
7	15	(Argentina) Esteban Guerrieri	BCN Competicion	1:37.606	+0.704	7
8	16	(Germany) Tony Schmidt	Ma-Con Engineering	1:37.951	+1.049	8
9	2	(Monaco) Robert Doornbos	Arden International	1:37.978	+1.076	9
10	10	(South Africa) Alan van der Merwe	Super Nova Racing	1:38.015	+1.113	10
11	9	(Belgium) Jeffrey van Hooydonk	Super Nova Racing	1:38.066	+1.164	11
12	19	(Italy) Ferdinando Monfardini	AEZ Racing	1:38.145	+1.243	12
13	4	(Austria) Mathias Lauda	CMS Performance	1:38.338	+1.436	13
14	6	(Venezuela) Ernesto Viso	Durango	1:38.358	+1.456	14
15	11	(Belgium) Nico Verdonck	Team Astromega	1:39.058	+2.156	15
16	12	(Netherlands) Olivier Tielemans	Team Astromega	1:43.083	+6.181	16
17	5	(France) Yannick Schroeder	Durango	1:46.249	+9.347	17
Lähde:

=== Race ===
Pos	No	Driver	Team	Laps	Time/Retired	Grid	Points
1	1	(Italy) Vitantonio Liuzzi	Arden International	30	50:22.548	1	10
2	14	(Italy) Enrico Toccacelo	BCN Competicion	30	+1.088	2	8
3	17	(Czech Republic) Tomáš Enge	Ma-Con Engineering	30	+2.988	4	6
4	3	(Argentina) José María López	CMS Performance	30	+18.892	3	5
5	7	(Austria) Patrick Friesacher	Coloni Motorsport	30	+21.769	5	4
6	18	(Italy) Raffaele Giammaria	AEZ Racing	30	+26.902	6	3
7	16	(Germany) Tony Schmidt	Ma-Con Engineering	30	+35.925	8	2
8	10	(South Africa) Alan van der Merwe	Super Nova Racing	30	+42.330	10	1
9	19	(Italy) Ferdinando Monfardini	AEZ Racing	30	+45.368	12	
10	2	(Monaco) Robert Doornbos	Arden International	30	+47.241	9	
11	6	(Venezuela) Ernesto Viso	Durango	30	+47.454	14	
12	11	(Belgium) Nico Verdonck	Team Astromega	30	+1:04.814	15	
13	4	(Austria) Mathias Lauda	CMS Performance	30	+1.05.657	13	
14	5	(France) Yannick Schroeder	Durango	30	+1:07.254	17	
15	15	(Argentina) Esteban Guerrieri	BCN Competicion	30	+1:25.200	7	
Ret	9	(Belgium) Jeffrey van Hooydonk	Super Nova Racing	5	Retired	11	
Ret	12	(Netherlands) Olivier Tielemans	Team Astromega	1	Retired	16	
Lähde:

== Standings after the event ==
Drivers' Championship standings

	Pos.	Driver	Points
	1	(Italy) Vitantonio Liuzzi	50
	2	(Italy) Enrico Toccacelo	42
1	3	(Italy) Raffaele Gianmaria	22
1	4	(Monaco) Robert Doornbos	21
1	5	(Czech Republic) Tomáš Enge	20

Teams' Championship standings

	Pos.	Team	Points
	1	(United Kingdom) Arden International	71
	2	(Spain) BCN Competicion	54
1	3	(Germany) Ma-Con Engineering	24
1	4	(Italy) AEZ Racing	22
1	5	(Italy) CMS Performance	20

- Note: Only the top five positions are included for both sets of standings.

== See also ==
- 2004 British Grand Prix

Previous round: 2004 Magny-Cours F3000 round	International Formula 3000 Championship; 2004 season	Next round: 2004 Hockenheimring F3000 round
Previous round: 2003 Silverstone F3000 round	Silverstone F3000 round	Next round: 2005 Silverstone GP2 Series round
