= Nissany =

Nissany is a Hebrew surname. Notable people with the surname include:

- Chanoch Nissany (born 1963), Israeli-Hungarian racing driver
- Roy Nissany (born 1994), French-Israeli racing driver, son of Chanoch
