= Rodrigo Ribeiro =

Rodrigo Ribeiro may refer to:

- Rodrigo Ribeiro (footballer, born 1978), Brazilian football centre-back
- Rodrigo Ribeiro (racing driver) (born 1979), Brazilian racing driver
- Rodrigo Ribeiro (footballer, born 2005), Portuguese football forward for Sporting
