= 2005 Imola GP2 Series round =

(San Marino) 2005 Imola GP2 round
Round details
- Round 1 of 12 rounds in the 2005 GP2 Series
- Circuit de Imola
- Location: Autodromo Enzo e Dino Ferrari; Imola, Italy
- Course: Permanent racing facility 4.933 km (3.065 mi)

GP2 Series

Feature race
- Date: 23 April 2005
- Laps: 37

Pole position
Driver	(France) Nicolas Lapierre	Arden International
- Time: 1:33.505

Podium
First	(Finland) Heikki Kovalainen	Arden International
Second	(France) José María López	DAMS
Third	(United States) Scott Speed	iSport International

Fastest lap
Driver	(Venezuela) Ernesto Viso	BCN Competición
- Time: 1:35.257 (on lap 35)

Sprint race
- Date: 24 April 2005
- Laps: 17

Podium
First	(United Kingdom) Adam Carroll	Super Nova International
Second	(France) Alexandre Prémat	ART Grand Prix
Third	(Finland) Heikki Kovalainen	Arden International

Fastest lap
Driver	(France) Nicolas Lapierre	Arden International
- Time: 1:33.871 (on lap 2)

The 2005 San Marino GP2 round was a GP2 Series motor race held on 23 and 24 April 2005 at the Autodromo Enzo e Dino Ferrari in Imola, Italy. It was the first race of the 2005 GP2 Series season. The race was used to support the 2005 San Marino Grand Prix.

The first race was won by Heikki Kovalainen for Arden International, with José María López second for DAMS and Scott Speed finishing third for iSport International. Polesitter Nicolas Lapierre did not start.

The second race was won by Adam Carroll for Super Nova International, with Alexandre Prémat for ART Grand Prix and Heikki Kovalainen also on the podium.

== Classification ==
=== Qualifying ===
Pos	No	Driver	Team	Time	Gap	Grid
1	23	(France) Nicolas Lapierre	Arden International	1:33.505		1
2	7	(Italy) Giorgio Pantano	Super Nova International	1:33.510	+0.005	2
3	14	(France) José María López	DAMS	1:33.577	+0.072	3
4	5	(Venezuela) Ernesto Viso	BCN Competición	1:33.852	+0.347	4
5	22	(Finland) Heikki Kovalainen	Arden International	1:33.927	+0.422	5
6	1	(United States) Scott Speed	iSport International	1:33.984	+0.479	6
7	8	(United Kingdom) Adam Carroll	Super Nova International	1:34.122	+0.617	7
8	3	(Brazil) Nelson Piquet Jr.	Hitech Piquet Sports	1:34.183	+0.678	8
9	17	(Italy) Gianmaria Bruni	Coloni Motorsport	1:34.187	+0.682	9
10	20	(Spain) Juan Cruz Álvarez	Campos Racing	1:34.658	+1.153	10
11	9	(Germany) Nico Rosberg	ART Grand Prix	1:34.763	+1.258	11
12	18	(Switzerland) Neel Jani	Racing Engineering	1:35.020	+1.515	12
13	12	(United Kingdom) Ryan Sharp	DPR	1:35.101	+1.596	13
14	25	(Italy) Ferdinando Monfardini	Durango	1:35.129	+1.624	14
15	11	(France) Olivier Pla	DPR	1:35.303	+1.798	15
16	4	(Brazil) Alexandre Negrão	Hitech Piquet Sports	1:35.672	+2.167	16
17	10	(France) Alexandre Prémat	ART Grand Prix	1:35.704	+2.199	17
18	2	(Turkey) Can Artam	iSport International	1:36.016	+2.511	18
19	19	(Spain) Borja García	Racing Engineering	1:36.162	+2.657	19
20	16	(Austria) Mathias Lauda	Coloni Motorsport	1:36.380	+2.875	20
21	15	(United Kingdom) Fairuz Fauzy	DAMS	1:37.591	+4.086	21
22	21	(Spain) Sergio Hernández	Campos Racing	1:38.739	+5.234	22
23	24	(Monaco) Clivio Piccione	Durango	1:39.148	+5.643	23
24	6	(Japan) Hiroki Yoshimoto	BCN Competición	1:57.446	+23.941	24
107% time: 1:40.050

=== Feature race ===
Pos	No	Driver	Team	Laps	Time/Retired	Grid	Points
1	22	(Finland) Heikki Kovalainen	Arden International	37	1:02.15.934	5	10
2	14	(France) José María López	DAMS	37	+6.802	3	8
3	1	(United States) Scott Speed	iSport International	37	+17.742	6	6
4	17	(Italy) Gianmaria Bruni	Coloni Motorsport	37	+18.438	9	5
5	8	(United Kingdom) Adam Carroll	Super Nova International	37	+21.571	7	4
6	18	(Switzerland) Neel Jani	Racing Engineering	37	+43.007	12	3
7	10	(France) Alexandre Prémat	ART Grand Prix	37	+46.919	17	2
8	9	(Germany) Nico Rosberg	ART Grand Prix	37	+48.672	11	1
9	11	(France) Olivier Pla	DPR	37	+56.079	15	
10	5	(Venezuela) Ernesto Viso	BCN Competición	37	+1:21.028	4	2
11	21	(Spain) Sergio Hernández	Campos Racing	37	+1:30.550	22	
12	16	(Austria) Mathias Lauda	Coloni Motorsport	36	+1 lap	20	
13	7	(Italy) Giorgio Pantano	Super Nova International	35	+2 laps	2	
14	3	(Brazil) Nelson Piquet Jr.	Hitech Piquet Sports	35	+2 laps	8	
15	24	(Monaco) Clivio Piccione	Durango	35	+2 laps	23	
16	2	(Turkey) Can Artam	iSport International	34	+3 laps	18	
17	15	(United Kingdom) Fairuz Fauzy	DAMS	33	+4 laps	21	
Ret	19	(Spain) Borja García	Racing Engineering	30	+7 laps	19	
Ret	25	(Italy) Ferdinando Monfardini	Durango	30	+7 laps	14	
Ret	20	(Spain) Juan Cruz Álvarez	Campos Racing	23	+14 laps	10	
Ret	12	(United Kingdom) Ryan Sharp	DPR	11	+26 laps	13	
Ret	6	(Japan) Hiroki Yoshimoto	BCN Competición	11	+26 laps	24	
Ret	4	(Brazil) Alexandre Negrão	Hitech Piquet Sports	4	+33 laps	16	
DNS	23	(France) Nicolas Lapierre	Arden International	0	+37 laps	1	2
Fastest lap: Ernesto Viso (BCN Competición) 1:35.257 (on lap 35)

=== Sprint race ===
Pos	No	Driver	Team	Laps	Time/Retired	Grid	Points
1	8	(United Kingdom) Adam Carroll	Super Nova International	17	28:31.314	4	6
2	10	(France) Alexandre Prémat	ART Grand Prix	17	+5.460	2	5
3	22	(Finland) Heikki Kovalainen	Arden International	17	+6.715	8	4
4	17	(Italy) Gianmaria Bruni	Coloni Motorsport	17	+9.964	5	3
5	11	(France) Olivier Pla	DPR	17	+11.519	9	2
6	3	(Brazil) Nelson Piquet Jr.	Hitech Piquet Sports	17	+13.580	14	1
7	20	(Spain) Juan Cruz Álvarez	Campos Racing	17	+25.769	20	
8	21	(Spain) Sergio Hernández	Campos Racing	17	+27.737	11	
9	6	(Japan) Hiroki Yoshimoto	BCN Competición	17	+29.741	22	
10	19	(Spain) Borja García	Racing Engineering	17	+37.248	18	
11	14	(France) José María López	DAMS	17	+37.482	7	
12	15	(United Kingdom) Fairuz Fauzy	DAMS	17	+37.965	17	
13	4	(Brazil) Alexandre Negrão	Hitech Piquet Sports	17	+45.909	23	
14	12	(United Kingdom) Ryan Sharp	DPR	17	+57.807	21	
15	18	(Switzerland) Neel Jani	Racing Engineering	16	+1 lap	3	
Ret	7	(Italy) Giorgio Pantano	Super Nova International	14	+3 laps	13	
Ret	9	(Germany) Nico Rosberg	ART Grand Prix	12	+5 laps	1	
Ret	23	(France) Nicolas Lapierre	Arden International	5	+12 laps	24	2
Ret	16	(Austria) Mathias Lauda	Coloni Motorsport	3	+14 laps	12	
Ret	2	(Turkey) Can Artam	iSport International	3	+14 laps	16	
Ret	1	(United States) Scott Speed	iSport International	2	+15 laps	6	
Ret	24	(Monaco) Clivio Piccione	Durango	1	+16 laps	15	
DNS	5	(Venezuela) Ernesto Viso	BCN Competición	0	+17 laps	10	
DNS	25	(Italy) Ferdinando Monfardini	Durango	0	+17 laps	19	
Fastest lap: Nicolas Lapierre (Arden International) 1:33.871 (on lap 2)

== Standings after the round ==
Drivers' Championship standings

Pos	Driver	Points
1	(Finland) Heikki Kovalainen	14
2	(United Kingdom) Adam Carroll	10
3	(France) José María López	8
4	(Italy) Gianmaria Bruni	8
5	(France) Alexandre Prémat	7

Teams' Championship standings

Pos	Team	Points
1	(Netherlands) Arden International	18
2	(United Kingdom) Super Nova International	10
3	(France) ART Grand Prix	8
4	(France) DAMS	8
5	(Italy) Coloni Motorsport	8

- Note: Only the top five positions are included for both sets of standings.

Previous round: 2004 Monza F3000 round	GP2 Series; 2005 season	Next round: 2005 Catalunya GP2 Series round
Previous round: 2004 Imola F3000 round	Imola GP2 round	Next round: 2006 San Marino GP2 Series round
