= 2003 British Formula 3 International Series =

Seasons
- ← 2002 2004 →

The 2003 British Formula Three season was the 53rd British Formula Three Championship season. It commenced on 6 April, and ended on 28 September after twenty-four races.

The scoring system was 20-15-12-10-8-6-4-3-2-1 points awarded to the first ten finishers, with one extra point added to the driver who set the fastest lap of the race. If a Class B driver finished among the top finishers, he would not score points for the main championship, and the points would be awarded to the next driver in the standings.

== Drivers and teams ==
The following teams and drivers were competitors in the 2003 British Formula Three Championship. The Scholarship class is for older Formula Three cars. Teams in the Invitation class are not series regulars, and do not compete for championship points.

Team	Chassis	Engine	No	Driver	Rounds
Championship Class
(United Kingdom) Alan Docking Racing	Dallara F303	Mugen-Honda	1	(Australia) Will Davison	1-9
(United Kingdom) Alan Docking Racing	Dallara F303	Mugen-Honda	1	(United Kingdom) Adam Carroll	10
(United Kingdom) Alan Docking Racing	Dallara F303	Mugen-Honda	1	(Brazil) João Paulo de Oliveira	11
(United Kingdom) Alan Docking Racing	Dallara F303	Mugen-Honda	1	(United Kingdom) Robbie Kerr	12
(United Kingdom) Alan Docking Racing	Dallara F303	Mugen-Honda	2	(United States) Scott Speed	1-8, 12
(United Kingdom) Alan Docking Racing	Dallara F303	Mugen-Honda	2	(United States) Joel Nelson	9-10
(United Kingdom) Alan Docking Racing	Dallara F303	Mugen-Honda	2	(Austria) Reinhard Kofler	11
(United Kingdom) Carlin Motorsport	Dallara F303	Mugen-Honda	3	(United States) Richard Antinucci	1-8
(United Kingdom) Carlin Motorsport	Dallara F303	Mugen-Honda	3	(Republic of Ireland) Michael Keohane	9, 11-12
(United Kingdom) Carlin Motorsport	Dallara F303	Mugen-Honda	3	(Portugal) Álvaro Parente	10
(United Kingdom) Carlin Motorsport	Dallara F303	Mugen-Honda	4	(United Kingdom) Jamie Green	All
(United Kingdom) Carlin Motorsport	Dallara F303	Mugen-Honda	21	(South Africa) Alan van der Merwe	All
(United Kingdom) Carlin Motorsport	Dallara F303	Mugen-Honda	22	(Denmark) Ronnie Bremer	All
(United Kingdom) Fortec Motorsport	Dallara F303	Renault Sodemo	5	(Australia) Will Power	6-12
(United Kingdom) Fortec Motorsport	Dallara F303	Renault Sodemo	6	(Sweden) Robert Dahlgren	All
(United Kingdom) Promatecme UK	Dallara F303	Mugen-Honda	7	(Republic of Ireland) Michael Keohane	1-5
(United Kingdom) Promatecme UK	Dallara F303	Mugen-Honda	7	(United States) Richard Antinucci	9-12
(United Kingdom) Promatecme UK	Dallara F303	Mugen-Honda	8	(Brazil) Ernani Judice	1-5
(United Kingdom) Promatecme UK	Dallara F303	Mugen-Honda	8	(Malaysia) Fairuz Fauzy	7-12
(United Kingdom) Manor Motorsport	Dallara F303	Mugen-Honda	9	(Monaco) Clivio Piccione	All
(United Kingdom) Manor Motorsport	Dallara F303	Mugen-Honda	10	(Italy) Stefano Fabi	1-9
(United Kingdom) Manor Motorsport	Dallara F303	Mugen-Honda	23	(United Kingdom) Tor Graves	All
(United Kingdom) Manor Motorsport	Dallara F303	Mugen-Honda	35	(United Kingdom) Lewis Hamilton	12
(Switzerland) Menu F3 Motorsport	Dallara F303	Opel Spiess	11	(United Kingdom) Rob Austin	1-7
(Switzerland) Menu F3 Motorsport	Dallara F303	Opel Spiess	11	(Netherlands) Robert Doornbos	10, 12
(Switzerland) Menu F3 Motorsport	Dallara F303	Opel Spiess	12	(United Kingdom) Adam Carroll	5-9
(Switzerland) Menu F3 Motorsport	Dallara F303	Opel Spiess	12	(Australia) Will Davison	10-12
(United Kingdom) Lola Cars	Lola-Dome F106-03	Opel Spiess	15	(United Kingdom) Adam Carroll	1-2
(United Kingdom) Hitech Racing	Dallara F303	Renault Sodemo	16	(United Kingdom) Andrew Thompson	All
(United Kingdom) Hitech Racing	Dallara F303	Renault Sodemo	17	(United Kingdom) Danny Watts	All
(United Kingdom) Hitech Racing	Dallara F303	Renault Sodemo	24	(Brazil) Fabio Carbone	1
(United Kingdom) Hitech Racing	Dallara F303	Renault Sodemo	24	(France) Eric Salignon	2-12
(United Kingdom) Team SYR	Dallara F303	Opel Spiess	18	(Malaysia) Rizal Ramli	All
(United Kingdom) Team SYR	Dallara F303	Opel Spiess	19	(Malaysia) Fairuz Fauzy	1-6
(United Kingdom) Team SYR	Dallara F303	Opel Spiess	19	(Denmark) Jesper Carlsen	7
(United Kingdom) Team SYR	Dallara F303	Opel Spiess	19	(Brazil) Tuka Rocha	8
(United Kingdom) Team SYR	Dallara F303	Opel Spiess	19	(Japan) Masato Shimoyama	9-12
(United Kingdom) Team SYR	Dallara F303	Opel Spiess	26	(Malaysia) Farriz Fauzy	1-6
(United Kingdom) Team SYR	Dallara F303	Opel Spiess	26	(United Kingdom) Katherine Legge	7-8
(United Kingdom) Diamond Racing	Ralt F303	Mugen-Honda	25	(Australia) Will Power	1-5
(United Kingdom) P1 Motorsport	Dallara F303	Opel Spiess	27	(Canada) Billy Asaro	3-12
(Brazil) Piquet Sports	Dallara F303	Mugen-Honda	33	(Brazil) Nelson Ângelo Piquet	All
Scholarship Class
(United Kingdom) P1 Motorsport	Dallara F301	Mugen-Honda	51	(Venezuela) Ernesto Viso	All
(Malaysia) Meritus Racing	Dallara F301	Mugen-Honda	56	(United Kingdom) Ivor McCullough	1-5
(United Kingdom) Promatecme UK	Dallara F301	Mugen-Honda	57	(United Kingdom) Christian England	1-5
(United Kingdom) Promatecme UK	Dallara F301	Mugen-Honda	57	(Turkey) Can Artam	7-9
(United Kingdom) T-Sport	Dallara F301	Mugen-Honda	58	(United Kingdom) Steven Kane	All
(United Kingdom) T-Sport	Dallara F301	Mugen-Honda	59	(India) Karun Chandhok	All
(United Kingdom) Essential Motorsport	Dallara F301	Toyota	61	(Brazil) Alex Pozzobon	1-3
(Spain) Azteca Motorsport	Dallara F301	Opel Spiess	62	(Spain) Sergio Hernández	1-2, 5
(Sweden) Performance Racing Europe	Dallara F301	Opel Spiess	63	(United Kingdom) Justin Sherwood	1-3, 5-6, 9-12
(Sweden) Performance Racing Europe	Dallara F301	Opel Spiess	64	(Canada) Jesse Mason	1, 3, 5
Invitation Entries
(Italy) Lucidi Motors	Dallara F302	Opel Spiess	43	(Belgium) Gregory Franchi	10
(Italy) Prema Powerteam	Dallara F303	Opel Spiess	44	(Australia) Ryan Briscoe	10
(Italy) Prema Powerteam	Dallara F303	Opel Spiess	45	(Japan) Katsuyuki Hiranaka	10
(Italy) Prema Powerteam	Dallara F303	Opel Spiess	46	(Poland) Robert Kubica	10
(Belgium) JB Motorsports	Dallara F302	Opel Spiess	47	(Brazil) João Paulo de Oliveira	10

== Results ==
Round	Circuit	Date	Pole Position	Fastest Lap	Winning driver	Winning team	Scholarship Class Winner
1	(United Kingdom) Donington Park	6 April	(United Kingdom) Jamie Green	(South Africa) Alan van der Merwe	(United Kingdom) Jamie Green	Carlin Motorsport	(India) Karun Chandhok
2	(United Kingdom) Donington Park	6 April	(United Kingdom) Jamie Green	(United Kingdom) Jamie Green	(United Kingdom) Jamie Green	Carlin Motorsport	(United Kingdom) Steven Kane
3	(United Kingdom) Snetterton	20 April	(South Africa) Alan van der Merwe	(United States) Richard Antinucci	(South Africa) Alan van der Merwe	Carlin Motorsport	(Venezuela) Ernesto Viso
4	(United Kingdom) Snetterton	20 April	(South Africa) Alan van der Merwe	(United States) Richard Antinucci	(South Africa) Alan van der Merwe	Carlin Motorsport	(United Kingdom) Steven Kane
5	(United Kingdom) Croft	4 May	(Australia) Will Davison	(Australia) Will Davison	(Australia) Will Davison	Alan Docking Racing	(India) Karun Chandhok
6	(United Kingdom) Croft	4 May	(South Africa) Alan van der Merwe	(South Africa) Alan van der Merwe	(South Africa) Alan van der Merwe	Carlin Motorsport	(United Kingdom) Christian England
7	(United Kingdom) Knockhill	11 May	(Monaco) Clivio Piccione	(Monaco) Clivio Piccione	(Monaco) Clivio Piccione	Manor Motorsport	(United Kingdom) Steven Kane
8	(United Kingdom) Knockhill	11 May	(Brazil) Nelson Ângelo Piquet	(Brazil) Nelson Ângelo Piquet	(Brazil) Nelson Ângelo Piquet	Piquet Sports	(United Kingdom) Steven Kane
9	(United Kingdom) Silverstone	25 May	(Brazil) Nelson Ângelo Piquet	(Brazil) Nelson Ângelo Piquet	(Brazil) Nelson Ângelo Piquet	Piquet Sports	(India) Karun Chandhok
10	(United Kingdom) Silverstone	26 May	(Brazil) Nelson Ângelo Piquet	(South Africa) Alan van der Merwe	(South Africa) Alan van der Merwe	Carlin Motorsport	(India) Karun Chandhok
11	(United Kingdom) Castle Combe	22 June	(United Kingdom) Danny Watts	(United Kingdom) Adam Carroll	(South Africa) Alan van der Merwe	Carlin Motorsport	(Venezuela) Ernesto Viso
12	(United Kingdom) Castle Combe	22 June	(United Kingdom) Danny Watts	(United Kingdom) Danny Watts	(United Kingdom) Danny Watts	Hitech Racing	(Venezuela) Ernesto Viso
13	(United Kingdom) Oulton Park	13 July	(Brazil) Nelson Ângelo Piquet	(United Kingdom) Danny Watts	(South Africa) Alan van der Merwe	Carlin Motorsport	(India) Karun Chandhok
14	(United Kingdom) Oulton Park	13 July	(Brazil) Nelson Ângelo Piquet	(South Africa) Alan van der Merwe	(South Africa) Alan van der Merwe	Carlin Motorsport	(India) Karun Chandhok
15	(United Kingdom) Rockingham	3 August	(Brazil) Nelson Ângelo Piquet	(Brazil) Nelson Ângelo Piquet	(Brazil) Nelson Ângelo Piquet	Piquet Sports	(India) Karun Chandhok
16	(United Kingdom) Rockingham	3 August	(United Kingdom) Jamie Green	(Brazil) Nelson Ângelo Piquet	(United Kingdom) Jamie Green	Carlin Motorsport	(Venezuela) Ernesto Viso
17	(United Kingdom) Thruxton	17 August	(United Kingdom) Danny Watts	(Sweden) Robert Dahlgren	(Sweden) Robert Dahlgren	Fortec Motorsport	(United Kingdom) Steven Kane
18	(United Kingdom) Thruxton	17 August	(France) Eric Salignon	(France) Eric Salignon	(United Kingdom) Jamie Green	Carlin Motorsport	(Venezuela) Ernesto Viso
19*	(Belgium) Spa-Francorchamps	30 August	(South Africa) Alan van der Merwe	(United Kingdom) Jamie Green	(South Africa) Alan van der Merwe	Carlin Motorsport	(Venezuela) Ernesto Viso
20	(Belgium) Spa-Francorchamps	31 August	(Netherlands) Robert Doornbos	(United Kingdom) Jamie Green	(South Africa) Alan van der Merwe	Carlin Motorsport	(Venezuela) Ernesto Viso
21	(United Kingdom) Donington Park	6 September	(South Africa) Alan van der Merwe	(Brazil) Nelson Ângelo Piquet	(Brazil) Nelson Ângelo Piquet	Piquet Sports	(United Kingdom) Steven Kane
22	(United Kingdom) Donington Park	7 September	(United Kingdom) Rob Austin	(United Kingdom) Jamie Green	(United Kingdom) Rob Austin	Menu Motorsport	(Venezuela) Ernesto Viso
23	(United Kingdom) Brands Hatch	28 September	(Brazil) Nelson Ângelo Piquet	(Netherlands) Robert Doornbos	(Brazil) Nelson Ângelo Piquet	Piquet Sports	(Venezuela) Ernesto Viso
24	(United Kingdom) Brands Hatch	28 September	(Brazil) Nelson Ângelo Piquet	(Brazil) Nelson Ângelo Piquet	(Brazil) Nelson Ângelo Piquet	Piquet Sports	(India) Karun Chandhok

- * Round 19 stopped after 5 of 11 laps, half points awarded.

== Standings ==
Pos	Driver	DON (United Kingdom)		SNE (United Kingdom)		CRO (United Kingdom)		KNO (United Kingdom)		SIL (United Kingdom)		CAS (United Kingdom)		OUL (United Kingdom)		ROC (United Kingdom)		THR (United Kingdom)		SPA (Belgium)		DON (United Kingdom)		BRH (United Kingdom)		Pts
1	(South Africa) Alan van der Merwe	2	2	1	1	3	1	6	4	7	1	1	4	1	1	4	3	2	Ret	1	1	Ret	2	11	4	308
2	(United Kingdom) Jamie Green	1	1	5	2	Ret	2	Ret	2	11	4	7	10	4	3	7	1	3	1	2	3	7	4	Ret	3	236,5
3	(Brazil) Nelson Ângelo Piquet	EX	3	2	5	8	12	2	1	1	6	9	8	Ret	4	1	2	Ret	12	3	7	1	6	1	1	231
4	(United States) Richard Antinucci	5	11	NC	4	5	3	3	11	5	2	Ret	9	7	5	Ret	9	Ret	6	9	Ret	2	8	8	9	125.5
5	(United Kingdom) Danny Watts	13	8	4	7	6	DNS	17	10	3	5	Ret	1	2	7	19	DNS	6	13	12	6	15	3	3	12	125
6	(Denmark) Ronnie Bremer	6	5	3	Ret	4	6	4	8	10	10	4	5	8	15	3	Ret	7	4	5	Ret	DNS	5	9	10	121
7	(United Kingdom) Rob Austin	4	4	16	3	2	5	Ret	Ret	6	3	20	7	10	11							3	1			110
8	(Australia) Will Davison	12	12	22	Ret	1	Ret	5	5	4	7	Ret	16	5	8	9	Ret	Ret	7	14	11	4	7	2	7	103
9	(Sweden) Robert Dahlgren	11	7	6	Ret	12	7	18	6	19	16	3	2	6	Ret	Ret	6	1	Ret	18	9	6	17	6	6	102
10	(United Kingdom) Adam Carroll	Ret	6	12	Ret					2	12	2	3	3	2	10	Ret	Ret	3	10	Ret					90
11	(Monaco) Clivio Piccione	8	14	7	9	14	Ret	1	14	9	9	6	6	Ret	6	2	4	12	19	27	12	9	Ret	12	19	84
12	(France) Eric Salignon			14	11	22	17	16	16	16	13	8	14	16	14	11	Ret	5	11	8	2	Ret	13	5	8	43
13	(Republic of Ireland) Michael Keohane	3	17	Ret	8	Ret	4	11	3	Ret	Ret							10	Ret			Ret	22	10	21	42
14	(Australia) Will Power	17	23	Ret	19							5	12	12	9	5	15	Ret	2	4	17	Ret	11	23	17	39
15	(Canada) Billy Asaro					18	8	9	21	18	22	13	Ret	9	19	8	8	18	Ret	19	22	Ret	Ret	4	5	34
16	(Malaysia) Fairuz Fauzy	7	13	8	Ret	10	Ret	10	15	15	18	16	17	11	10	20	5	4	18	11	15	11	Ret	17	13	30.5
17	(Netherlands) Robert Doornbos																			15	5			Ret	2	26
18	(United Kingdom) Andrew Thompson	16	16	11	Ret	11	11	Ret	13	20	20	11	22	Ret	16	21	DNS	13	5	23	23	10	10	7	11	19
19	(Italy) Stefano Fabi	20	20	15	Ret	7	10	8	Ret	13	27	15	13	Ret	Ret	6	Ret	Ret	9							19
20	(Brazil) Ernani Judice	9	9	Ret	6	9	Ret	12	Ret	Ret	8															15
21	(Malaysia) Rizal Ramli	21	24	Ret	DNS	Ret	18	20	20	21	21	17	Ret	17	18	18	14	14	16	25	24	5	18	21	16	9
22	(Portugal) Álvaro Parente																			7	8					7
23	(United States) Scott Speed	26	27	9	Ret	13	16	14	18	14	11	10	18	13	17	DNS	DNS							16	Ret	3
24	(Brazil) Tuka Rocha															15	11									2
25	(Brazil) Fabio Carbone	15	10																							1
26	(Brazil) João Paulo de Oliveira																			17	10	17	12			0
27	(Austria) Reinhard Kofler																					12	16			0
28	(United States) Joel Nelson																	Ret	17	Ret	13					0
29	(United Kingdom) Robbie Kerr																							14	14	0
30	(United Kingdom) Tor Graves	Ret	22	Ret	14	Ret	Ret	21	19	Ret	Ret	Ret	19	15	Ret	17	Ret	Ret	15	Ret	19	Ret	19	20	Ret	0
31	(Japan) Masato Shimoyama																	17	21	DNS	25	16	20	22	20	0
32	(United Kingdom) Katherine Legge													19	Ret	16	Ret									0
33	(Malaysia) Farriz Fauzy	24	Ret	20	18	Ret	19	Ret	22	27	25	19	Ret													0
	(Denmark) Jesper Carlsen													Ret	Ret											0
	(United Kingdom) Lewis Hamilton																							Ret	Ret	0
guest drivers ineligible for championship points
	(Australia) Ryan Briscoe																			6	4					0
	(Poland) Robert Kubica																			13	Ret					0
	(Belgium) Gregory Franchi																			22	14					0
	(Japan) Katsuyuki Hiranaka																			16	20					0
Scholarship Class
1	(Venezuela) Ernesto Viso	Ret	Ret	10	12	16	14	13	9	22	26	12	11	Ret	13	13	7	9	8	20	16	13	9	13	Ret	323
2	(United Kingdom) Steven Kane	18	15	18	10	17	Ret	7	7	12	15	14	15	20	Ret	14	13	8	10	26	21	8	21	15	Ret	316.5
3	(India) Karun Chandhok	10	18	13	15	15	Ret	15	Ret	8	14	Ret	20	14	12	12	10	11	14	21	18	Ret	14	18	15	314.5
4	(United Kingdom) Justin Sherwood	19	21	17	17	20	15			25	19	18	21					15	20	24	26	14	15	19	18	176
5	(United Kingdom) Christian England	14	26	Ret	16	19	9	19	12	17	Ret															94
6	(United Kingdom) Ivor McCullough	25	19	Ret	13	21	13	Ret	17	23	17															79
7	(Turkey) Can Artam													18	DNS	Ret	12	16	Ret							35
8	(Spain) Sergio Hernández	22	Ret	19	Ret					24	23															30
9	(Brazil) Alex Pozzobon	23	DNS	21	Ret	DNS	20																			20
10	(Canada) Jesse Mason	Ret	25			Ret	Ret			26	24															17
Pos	Driver	DON (United Kingdom)		SNE (United Kingdom)		CRO (United Kingdom)		KNO (United Kingdom)		SIL (United Kingdom)		CAS (United Kingdom)		OUL (United Kingdom)		ROC (United Kingdom)		THR (United Kingdom)		SPA (Belgium)		DON (United Kingdom)		BRH (United Kingdom)		Pts

Colour	Result
Gold	Winner
Silver	Second place
Bronze	Third place
Green	Points classification
Blue	Non-points classification
Blue	Non-classified finish (NC)
Purple	Retired, not classified (Ret)
Red	Did not qualify (DNQ)
Red	Did not pre-qualify (DNPQ)
Black	Disqualified (DSQ)
White	Did not start (DNS)
White	Withdrew (WD)
White	Race cancelled (C)
Blank	Did not practice (DNP)
Blank	Did not arrive (DNA)
Blank	Excluded (EX)
