= 2004 International Formula 3000 Championship =

Motor racing competition

The 2004 International Formula 3000 season was the thirty-eight season of the second-tier of Formula One feeder championship and also twentieth and final season under the International Formula 3000 Championship moniker. It featured the 2004 FIA Formula 3000 International Championship, which was contested over ten rounds from 24 April to 11 September 2004. Two titles were awarded, a Championship for Drivers and a Championship for Teams. This was the final FIA Formula 3000 International Championship before it was replaced by the GP2 Series in 2005.

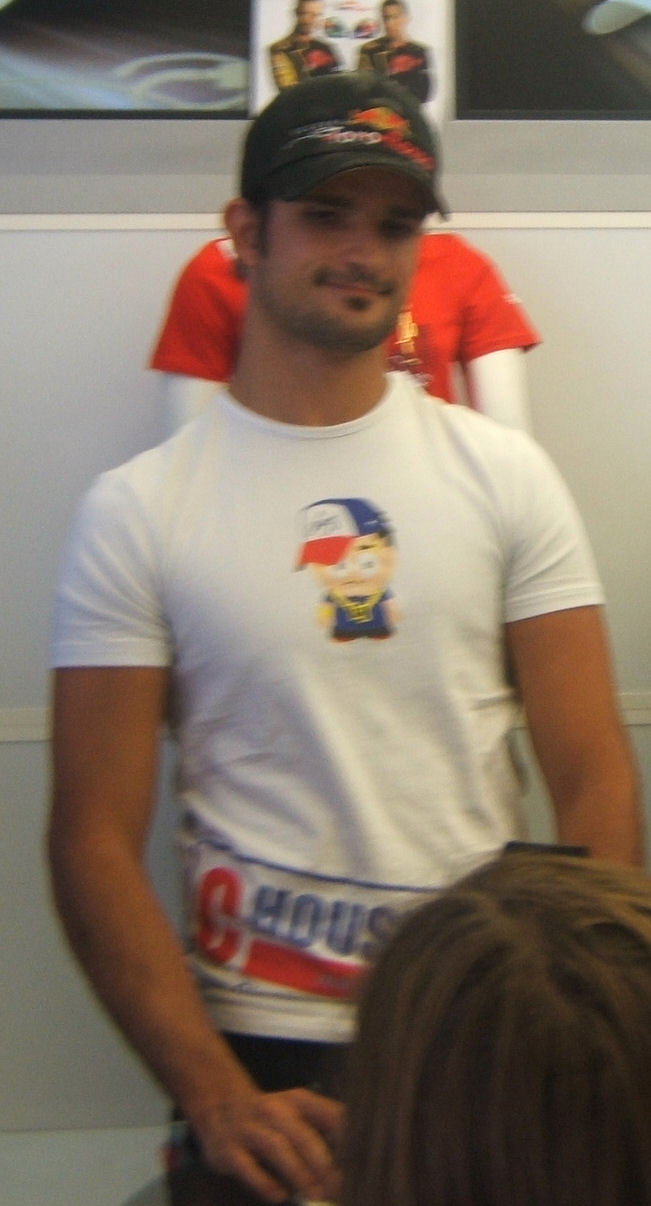
Vitantonio Liuzzi (pictured in 2007), won the final Formula 3000 championship

== Drivers and teams ==
The following drivers and teams contested the 2004 FIA Formula 3000 International Championship.

Team	No.	Driver	Rounds
(United Kingdom) Arden International	1	(Italy) Vitantonio Liuzzi	All
(United Kingdom) Arden International	2	(Monaco) Robert Doornbos (Note: Doornbos is a Dutch driver who competed under a Monaco racing licence.)	All
(Italy) CMS Performance	3	(Argentina) José María López	All
(Italy) CMS Performance	4	(Austria) Mathias Lauda	All
(Italy) Durango Corse	5	(France) Yannick Schroeder	1–8
(Italy) Durango Corse	5	(Italy) Matteo Meneghello	9
(Italy) Durango Corse	5	(Italy) Michele Rugolo	10
(Italy) Durango Corse	6	(Brazil) Rodrigo Ribeiro	1–4
(Italy) Durango Corse	6	(Venezuela) Ernesto Viso	5–10
(Italy) Coloni Motorsport	7	(Belgium) Jeffrey van Hooydonk	1–4
(Italy) Coloni Motorsport	7	(Austria) Patrick Friesacher	5–10
(Italy) Coloni Motorsport	8	(Turkey) Can Artam	1–5, 7
(Italy) Coloni Motorsport	8	(Israel) Chanoch Nissany	8–10
(United Kingdom) Super Nova Racing	9	(Austria) Patrick Friesacher	1–4
(United Kingdom) Super Nova Racing	9	(Belgium) Jeffrey van Hooydonk	5–10
(United Kingdom) Super Nova Racing	10	(South Africa) Alan van der Merwe	1–7
(United Kingdom) Super Nova Racing	10	(Turkey) Can Artam	8–10
(Belgium) Team Astromega	11	(Belgium) Nico Verdonck	1–9
(Belgium) Team Astromega	11	(Italy) Raffaele Giammaria	10
(Belgium) Team Astromega	12	(Belgium) Jan Heylen	1–4
(Belgium) Team Astromega	12	(Netherlands) Olivier Tielemans	6–10
(Spain) BCN F3000	14	(Italy) Enrico Toccacelo	All
(Spain) BCN F3000	15	(Argentina) Esteban Guerrieri	All
(Germany) Ma-Con Engineering	16	(Germany) Tony Schmidt	All
(Germany) Ma-Con Engineering	17	(Czech Republic) Tomáš Enge	All
(Italy) AEZ Racing	18	(Italy) Raffaele Giammaria	1–8
(Italy) AEZ Racing	18	(Italy) Matteo Grassotto	9–10
(Italy) AEZ Racing	19	(Italy) Ferdinando Monfardini	All

All entries used Lola B02/50 chassis with Zytek-Judd KV engines and Avon tyres.

== Calendar ==
Round	Circuit	Date	Distance	Pole position	Fastest lap	Winning driver	Winning team	Report
1	(Italy) Autodromo Enzo e Dino Ferrari	24 April	31 laps / 152.686 km	(Italy) Vitantonio Liuzzi	(Argentina) José María López	(Italy) Vitantonio Liuzzi	(United Kingdom) Arden International	Report
2	(Spain) Circuit de Catalunya	8 May	33 laps / 152.565 km	(Italy) Enrico Toccacelo	(Italy) Vitantonio Liuzzi	(Italy) Vitantonio Liuzzi	(United Kingdom) Arden International	Report
3	Circuit de Monaco	22 May	45 laps / 150.3 km	(Italy) Vitantonio Liuzzi	(Czech Republic) Tomáš Enge	(Italy) Vitantonio Liuzzi	(United Kingdom) Arden International	Report
4	(Germany) Nürburgring	29 May	30 laps / 154.423 km	(Italy) Vitantonio Liuzzi	(Argentina) José María López	(Italy) Enrico Toccacelo	(Spain) BCN Competicion	Report
5	(France) Circuit de Nevers Magny-Cours	3 July	35 laps / 154.201 km	(Italy) Vitantonio Liuzzi	(Italy) Vitantonio Liuzzi	(Italy) Vitantonio Liuzzi	(United Kingdom) Arden International	Report
6	(United Kingdom) Silverstone Circuit	10 July	30 laps / 154.125 km	(Italy) Vitantonio Liuzzi	(Czech Republic) Tomáš Enge	(Italy) Vitantonio Liuzzi	(United Kingdom) Arden International	Report
7	(Germany) Hockenheimring	24 July	33 laps / 150.942 km	(Italy) Vitantonio Liuzzi	(Italy) Enrico Toccacelo	(Italy) Vitantonio Liuzzi	(United Kingdom) Arden International	Report
8	(Hungary) Hungaroring	14 August	35 laps / 153.440 km	(Italy) Vitantonio Liuzzi	(Czech Republic) Tomáš Enge	(Austria) Patrick Friesacher	(Italy) Coloni Motorsport	Report
9	(Belgium) Circuit de Spa-Francorchamps	28 August	22 laps / 153.296 km	(Italy) Vitantonio Liuzzi	(Monaco) Robert Doornbos	(Monaco) Robert Doornbos	(United Kingdom) Arden International	Report
10	(Italy) Autodromo Nazionale Monza	11 September	26 laps / 150.353 km	(Italy) Vitantonio Liuzzi	(Italy) Vitantonio Liuzzi	(Italy) Vitantonio Liuzzi	(United Kingdom) Arden International	Report

== Drivers' Championship ==
Pos	Driver	IMO (Italy)	CAT (Spain)	MON (Monaco)	NÜR (Germany)	MAG (France)	SIL (United Kingdom)	HOC (Germany)	HUN (Hungary)	SPA (Belgium)	MNZ (Italy)	Points
1	(Italy) Vitantonio Liuzzi	**1**	1	**1**	**11**	**1**	**1**	**1**	**2**	**2**	**1**	86
2	(Italy) Enrico Toccacelo	2	**2**	2	1	12	2	2	3	12	Ret	56
3	(Monaco) Robert Doornbos	3	14	6	2	5	10	4	7	1	3	44
4	(Czech Republic) Tomáš Enge	5	Ret	14	7	2	3	Ret	4	4	2	38
5	(Austria) Patrick Friesacher	9	4	5	Ret	3	5	DNS	1	5	Ret	33
6	(Argentina) José María López	Ret	6	3	5	Ret	4	6	8	3	Ret	28
7	(Argentina) Esteban Guerrieri	Ret	5	Ret	4	6	15	3	5	7	5	28
8	(Italy) Raffaele Giammaria	4	3	4	6	Ret	6	Ret	10		4	27
9	(France) Yannick Schroeder	7	Ret	10	3	4	14	Ret	Ret			13
10	(Germany) Tony Schmidt	10		11	14	7	7	5	11	6	Ret	11
11	(Belgium) Jeffrey van Hooydonk	6	Ret	7	8	13	Ret	9	9	9	7	8
12	(Venezuela) Ernesto Viso					8	11	7	6	10	8	7
13	(Austria) Mathias Lauda	12	7	Ret	10	Ret	13	Ret	Ret	14	6	5
14	(South Africa) Alan van der Merwe	8	12	9	Ret	9	8	Ret				2
15	(Belgium) Nico Verdonck	15	9	12	12	11	12	8	12	11		1
16	(Belgium) Jan Heylen	11	11	8	9							1
17	(Brazil) Rodrigo Ribeiro	13	8	Ret	16							1
18	(Italy) Matteo Grassotto									8	Ret	1
19	(Turkey) Can Artam	Ret	10	Ret	13	Ret		10	14	13	9	0
20	(Italy) Ferdinando Monfardini	14	13	13	15	10	9	Ret	13	16	14	0
21	(Netherlands) Olivier Tielemans						Ret	12	15	Ret	11	0
22	(Israel) Chanoch Nissany								Ret	Ret	12	0
23	(Italy) Matteo Meneghello									15		0
–	(Italy) Michele Rugolo										Ret	0
Pos	Driver	IMO (Italy)	CAT (Spain)	MON (Monaco)	NÜR (Germany)	MAG (France)	SIL (United Kingdom)	HOC (Germany)	HUN (Hungary)	SPA (Belgium)	MNZ (Italy)	Points

Colour	Result
Gold	Winner
Silver	Second place
Bronze	Third place
Green	Points classification
Blue	Non-points classification
Blue	Non-classified finish (NC)
Purple	Retired, not classified (Ret)
Red	Did not qualify (DNQ)
Red	Did not pre-qualify (DNPQ)
Black	Disqualified (DSQ)
White	Did not start (DNS)
White	Withdrew (WD)
White	Race cancelled (C)
Blank	Did not practice (DNP)
Blank	Did not arrive (DNA)
Blank	Excluded (EX)

**Bold** — Pole
Italics — Fastest lap

- Points towards the 2004 FIA Formula 3000 International Championship for Drivers were awarded on a 10-8-6-5-4-3-2-1 basis for the first eight places at each round. The Sporting Regulations provided that if two or more drivers had the same number of points (including 0 points), their positions in the Championship was fixed according to the quality of their places. Under this system one first place was better than any number of second places, one second place was better than any number of third places, and so on.
- All drivers used Lola B02/50 chassis with Zytek-Judd KV engines and Avon tyres.

== Teams' Championship ==
Position	Team	IMO (Italy)	CAT (Spain)	MON (Monaco)	NUR (Germany)	MAG (France)	SIL (United Kingdom)	HOC (Germany)	HUN (Hungary)	SPA (Belgium)	MNZ (Italy)	Points
1	Arden International Ltd	16	10	13	8	14	10	15	10	18	16	130
2	BCN Competicion	8	12	8	15	3	8	14	10	2	4	84
3	Ma-Con Engineering	4	0	0	2	10	8	4	5	8	8	49
4	CMS Performance	0	5	6	4	0	5	3	1	6	3	33
5	Coloni Motorsport	3	0	2	1	6	4	0	10	4	0	30
6	AEZ I.E. Engineering	5	6	5	3	0	3	0	0	1	0	23
7	Durango	2	1	0	6	6	0	2	3	0	1	21
8	Super Nova Racing Ltd	1	5	4	0	0	1	0	0	0	2	13
9	Team Astromega	0	0	1	0	0	0	1	0	0	5	7

- Points towards the 2004 FIA Formula 3000 International Championship for Teams were awarded on a 10-8-6-5-4-3-2-1 basis for the first eight places at each round. The Sporting Regulations provided that if two or more teams had the same number of points (including 0 points), their positions in the Championship was fixed according to the quality of their places. Under this system one first place was better than any number of second places, one second place was better than any number of third places, and so on.
