= Matteo Grassotto =

Italian racing driver (born 1980)

- Nationality: (Italy) Italian
- Born: March 14, 1980 (age 46) Asolo, Veneto, Italy

Championship titles
- 2003: Bologna Motorshow F3000 Sprint

Matteo Grassotto (born 14 March 1980 in Asolo, Veneto) is an Italian former race car driver.

== Career ==
=== Formula Renault ===
Grassotto finished as runner-up in the 1998 Formula Renault Campus Italy series and then moved up to FRenault 2000 for 2000. In the European-wide series, he finished a competitive third in the final standings, and he also drove a handful of races in the Italian series, achieving one podium finish.

=== Formula Three ===
Grassotto graduated to German Formula Three in 2001, and finished 11th in the final drivers' standings.

=== Formula 3000 ===
Grassoto spent 2002 and 2003 in the Euro Formula 3000 series, in which he was a frontrunner, before moving to the more competitive FIA-backed series for the final two races of 2004 as a replacement for compatriot Raffaele Giammaria. He scored a point for eighth place on his début but retired from the next race. Unable to get a drive in the new GP2 Series for 2005, he went back to country level and competed in one race in Italian F3000.

== Racing record ==
=== Complete International Formula 3000 results ===
(key) (Races in bold indicate pole position; races in italics indicate fastest lap.)

Year	Entrant	1	2	3	4	5	6	7	8	9	10	DC	Points
2004	AEZ Racing	IMO	CAT	MON	NUR	MAG	SIL	HOC	HUN	SPA; 8	MNZ; Ret	18th	1
