= Olivier Tielemans =

Dutch racing driver (born 1984)

- Nationality: Dutch
- Born: 1 June 1984 (age 42) Weert, Netherlands
- Categorisation: FIA Silver

Previous series
- 2011 2010 2007-2008 2006 2005 2004 2003 2002 2002: Blancpain Endurance Series; Porsche Carrera Cup Germany; FIA World Touring Car Championship; Deutsche Tourenwagen Masters; 3000 Pro Series; FIA Formula 3000 Championship; Formula Renault 2000 Masters; Formula Renault 2000 Eurocup; Italian Formula Renault Championship

Olivier Tielemans (born June 1, 1984 in Weert) is a Dutch racing driver.

== Career ==
Tielemans' career started back in 1991 when he came fourth in the Dutch Kart Championship. Between 1995 and 1997, he raced in the Belgian Kart Championship and became Rookie of The Year.

In 2002, Tielemans moved into open-wheel racing competing in the Formula Renault 2000 Eurocup and Italian Formula Renault Championship for Tomcat Racing. For 2003, Tielemans moved to Dutch team MP Motorsport competing in the Formula Renault 2000 Masters. In 2004, he was signed to German FIA Formula 3000 Championship team ma-con, although did not drive for them, instead competing in the final six races of the season with Team Astromega. For the 2005 season he raced in the 3000 ProSeries.

In 2006, Tielemans switched from open-wheel racing to touring cars, securing a seat with the Futurecom TME team under direction from Colin Kolles, at the time part of Midland F1, in DTM, driving an Audi A4 alongside Vanina Ickx. He left the team after three races, being replaced by Jeroen Bleekemolen. For 2007, Tielemans moved into the World Touring Car Championship driving an Alfa Romeo 156 GTA for N.Technology, and in 2008 moving to Wiechers Motorsport driving a BMW 320Si. He finished the 2008 season in 20th place, scoring one overall championship point, but winning several races in the independent constructor category contesting for the title.

Following this, Tielemans largely disappeared from professional motor racing. In 2010, he drove at Zandvoort for MRS Team PZ Aschaffenburg in the Porsche Carrera Cup Germany as a guest driver, and in 2011 a single round of the 2011 Blancpain Endurance Series in a Lamborghini Gallardo LP560.

== Racing record ==
=== Complete International Formula 3000 results ===
(key) (Races in bold indicate pole position; races in italics indicate fastest lap.)

Year	Team	1	2	3	4	5	6	7	8	9	10	DC	Points
2004	Team Astromega	IMO	CAT	MON	NUR	MAG	SIL; Ret	HOC; 12	HUN; 15	SPA; Ret	MNZ; 11	NC	0

=== Complete 3000 Pro Series results ===
(key) (Races in bold indicate pole position; races in italics indicate fastest lap.)

Year	Team	1	2	3	4	5	6	7	8	DC	Points
2005	Scuderia Famà	VLL; 5	IMO; 15	SPA; 5	MUG; 5	MIS; 5	LAU; Ret	ADR	MNZ; 9	8th	16

=== Complete DTM results ===
(key)

Year	Team	Car	1	2	3	4	5	6	7	8	9	10	Pos	Points
2006	Futurecom TME	Audi A4 DTM 2004	HOC; 13	LAU; 17	OSC; 19	BRH	NOR	NÜR	ZAN	CAT	BUG	HOC	21st	0

=== Complete World Touring Car Championship results ===
key) (Races in bold indicate pole position) (Races in italics indicate fastest lap)

Year	Team	Car	1	2	3	4	5	6	7	8	9	10	11	12	13	14	15	16	17	18	19	20	21	22	23	24	DC	Points
2007	N.Technology	Alfa Romeo 156 GTA	BRA; 1 Ret	BRA; 2; 14	NED; 1; 16	NED; 2; 17	ESP; 1; 14	ESP; 2; 11	FRA; 1 Ret	FRA; 2; 16	CZE; 1; 19	CZE; 2; 16	POR; 1 Ret	POR; 2 DNS	SWE; 1; 13	SWE; 2; 21	GER; 1; 9	GER; 2 Ret	GBR; 1; 20	GBR; 2; 14	ITA; 1 Ret	ITA; 2; 11					NC	0
2008	Wiechers Motorsport	BMW 320si	BRA; 1; 8	BRA; 2; 14	MEX; 1; 19	MEX; 2; 17	ESP; 1; 15	ESP; 2 Ret	FRA; 1	FRA; 2	CZE; 1; 19	CZE; 2 Ret	POR; 1 Ret	POR; 2 DNS	GBR; 1	GBR; 2	GER; 1; 22	GER; 2; 18	EUR; 1	EUR; 2	ITA; 1	ITA; 2	JPN; 1	JPN; 2	MAC; 1	MAC; 2	20th	1
