= Chanoch Nissany =

Israeli and Hungarian racing driver (born 1963)

- חנוך ניסני
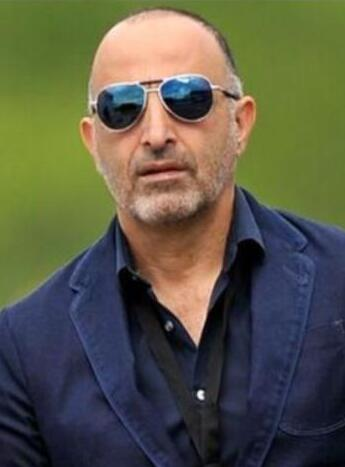
- Nissany in 2022
- Born: 29 July 1963 (age 63); Tel Aviv, Gush Dan, Israel
- Children: Roy
- Nationality: (Israel) Israeli; (Hungary) Hungarian; via dual nationality

Previous series
- International Formula 3000 (2004); World Series Lights (2003); Formula 2000 Hungarian National Championship (2002–2014)

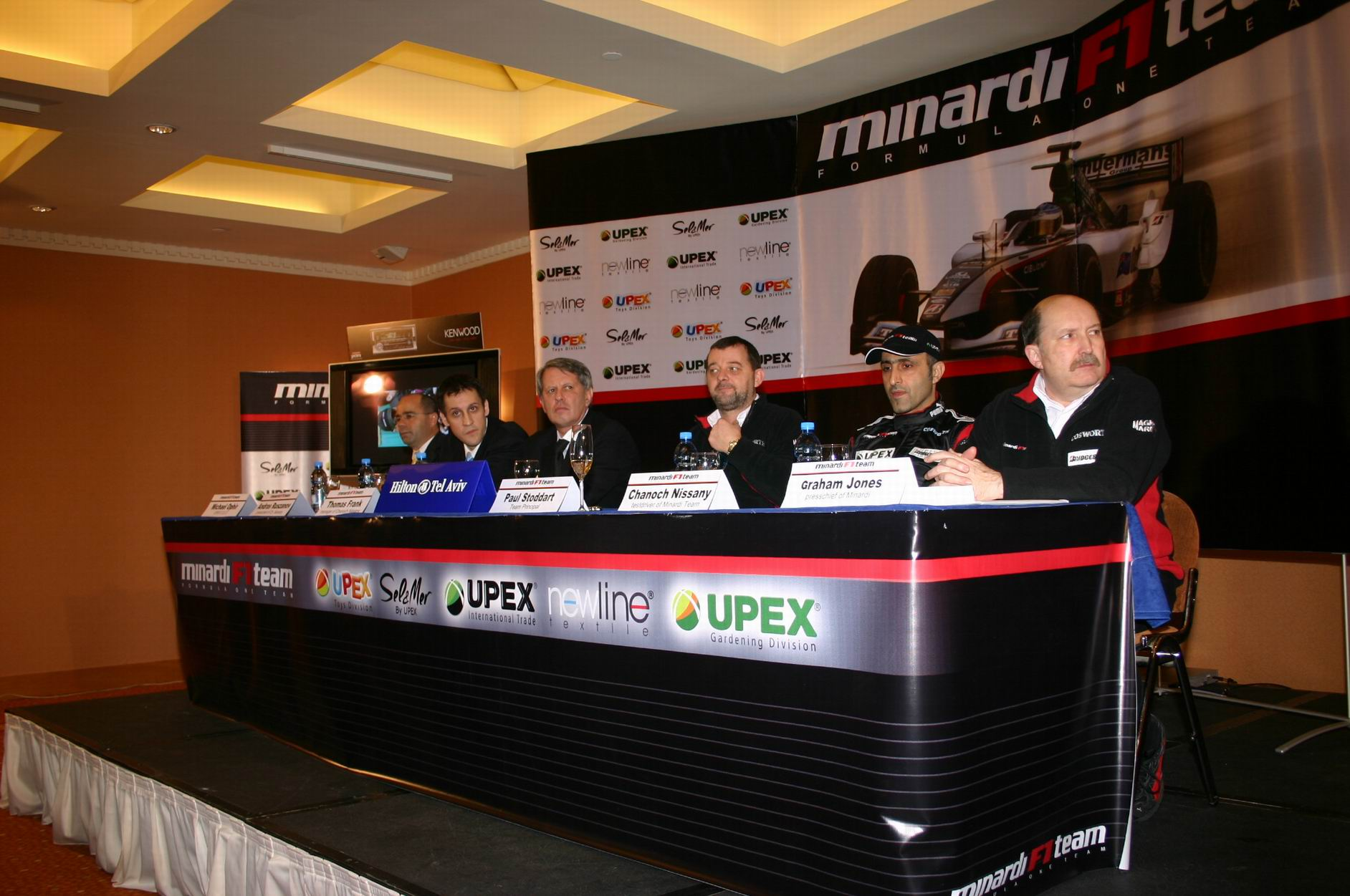
Press conference in Tel-Aviv to announce that Nissany had signed a test driver contract for the Minardi Formula One team for 2005.

Chanoch Nissany (Hebrew: חנוך ניסני; born 29 July 1963) is an Israeli and Hungarian former racing driver and real estate developer.

Nissany is the first Israeli racing driver to compete in some of the higher levels of the international racing sports, such as International Formula 3000 and World Series Lights. He is also the first Israeli who participated at a Formula One Grand Prix weekend, on his birthday, 29 July 2005, in the first free practice session of the 2005 Hungarian Grand Prix, when he drove at the Hungaroring as one of the official test drivers of the Minardi F1 Team. He was 6.8 seconds slower than teammate Christijan Albers in free practice at the event. After spinning the car, he was unable to take the steering wheel out of his Minardi so he was recovered with the car.

Nissany is the main investor in the Balaton Park Circuit, a motorsports venue opened in 2023.

Nissany's son, Roy Nissany, is also a racing driver.

== Career ==
Nissany started racing in 2002, at the relatively late age of 38. He began his career in the 2002 Formula 2000 Hungarian National Championship, and was runner-up in his first season. In the following year, he won the same competition racing for Szasz Motorsport at the wheel of a Coloni CN-98. From 2003, he started to compete at more international events such as FIA Central European Zone and World Series Lights. In 2004, he defended his title in the Formula 2000 Hungarian National Championship. Furthermore, Nissany signed a contract with Coloni Motorsport for 2004 and he competed in Formula 3000. Since he has progressed at Coloni, Nissany completed four tests – two with Jordan Grand Prix and two with Minardi.

On 2 February 2005, Paul Stoddart, the owner of the Minardi Formula One racing team made an announcement at the Hilton Hotel in Tel-Aviv. At this international press conference, Stoddart announced that Nissany had become the official test driver for the team for the 2005 season.

On his 42nd birthday, Nissany drove in the first practice session for the Hungarian Grand Prix, although his fastest time was 12.9 seconds slower than the fastest driver in the field, McLaren test driver Alexander Wurz. His only Formula One session ended in a gravel trap after a spin. Despite this, he initially complained that the car had too much grip. Nissany reportedly forgot how to remove the steering wheel from his cockpit, and would remain seated in his beached car while marshals removed it with a crane. At subsequent Grands Prix, he was replaced by Enrico Toccacelo.

In 2005, since Nissany focused on his international obligations with Minardi, he had to miss a couple of crucial races at the Formula 2000 Hungarian National Championship which cost him the title by six points. One year later, he regained the title and in 2007, he defended his title at the Formula 2000 Hungarian National Championship. He won all of his titles as Formula 2000 Hungarian National champion, except his last one in 2009, with Laszlo Szasz's racing team.

== Racing record ==
=== Formula 2000 Hungarian National Championship ===
Year	Team	Car	Position	Points
2002	Szasz Motorsport	Coloni CN-98	2nd	72
2003	Szasz Motorsport	Coloni CN-98	1st	142.5
2004	Szasz Racing Team	Coloni CN-98	1st	196
2005	Szasz Racing Team	Coloni CN-98	2nd	78
2006	Szasz Motorsport	Coloni Nissan	1st	98
2007	Szasz Motorsport	Coloni Nissan	1st	198
2008	Fonix Motorsport	Nissan	4th	66
2009	Fonix Motorsport	Formula Master	1st	112.5
2010	Fonix Motorsport	Formula Master	3rd	44
2011	Fonix Motorsport	Formula Master	5th	26
2013	G-Kart Team	Formula Master	5th	45
2014	G-Kart Team	Tatuus	8th	25

=== Complete World Series Lights results ===
(key) (Races in bold indicate pole position; races in italics indicate fastest lap.)

Year	Entrant	1	2	3	4	5	6	7	8	9	10	11	12	13	14	15	16	DC	Points
2003	Szasz Motorsport	MNZ; 1; 10	MNZ; 2; 12	LAU; 1; 7	LAU; 2; 11	MAG; 1	MAG; 2	A1R; 1; 10	A1R; 2; 9	CAT; 1	CAT; 2	VAL; 1 Ret	VAL; 2; 10	ALB; 1; 13	ALB; 2; 12	JAR; 1 Ret	JAR; 2; 11	14th	9

=== Complete International Formula 3000 results ===
(key) (Races in bold indicate pole position; races in italics indicate fastest lap.)

Year	Entrant	1	2	3	4	5	6	7	8	9	10	DC	Points
2004	Coloni Motorsport	IMO	CAT	MON	NUR	MAG	SIL	HOC	HUN; Ret	SPA; Ret	MNZ; 12	22nd	0

=== Complete Formula One participations ===
(key)

Year	Entrant	Chassis	Engine	1	2	3	4	5	6	7	8	9	10	11	12	13	14	15	16	17	18	19	WDC	Points
2005	Minardi Cosworth	Minardi PS05	Cosworth V10	AUS	MAL	BHR	SMR	ESP	MON	EUR	CAN	USA	FRA	GBR	GER	HUN; TD	TUR	ITA	BEL	BRA	JPN	CHN	–	–

== See also ==
- List of Israeli racing drivers
- List of Jewish racing drivers
