= Rodrigo Ribeiro (racing driver) =

Brazilian racing driver (born 1979)

Rodrigo Ribeiro (born January 25, 1979, in Rio de Janeiro) is a Brazilian racing driver.

== Career ==
=== Start ===
Ribeiro started his career in Fórmula Turismo, a popular touring race category, winning three races in his first year in 2000. He moved to the top category in 2001 named "Turismo N" where he was able to win four more races finishing in the top three positions. In the same year, he moved from touring to formula cars entering in the Formula Ford championship winning two races. He raced two Formula Chevrolet races in this year achieving one second place and a retire.

=== Formula Three ===
Ribeiro competed in Formula Three Sudamericana from 2002 to 2003, winning the title at his second attempt.

In his first year in 2002, Ribeiro stopped in the middle of the championship to make tests in European F3000. Raced twelve of eighteen races with his own team. He was in second position in the F3 championship. After he left the championship Ribeiro dropped to fifth place.

In 2002, in his first test for European F3000 Draco team, he was able to be the third one in Vallelunga circuit (Italy) when all the teams were testing new pilots.

In his second year, Ribeiro raced for Cesario F3 team winning 12 of 14 races to be the champion. He left the F3 Sulamericana with the championship title and four races to finish. He moved to Italy to be ready for the International F3000 pre-season.

=== Formula 3000 ===
Ribeiro stepped up to Formula 3000 for 2004, where he competed in four races, scoring one point in the process, before being dropped in favour of Ernesto Viso. He has since returned to racing in his native Brazil.

== Racing record ==
=== Complete International Formula 3000 results ===
(key)

Year	Entrant	1	2	3	4	5	6	7	8	9	10	DC	Points
2004	Durango Corse	IMO; 13	CAT; 8	MON; Ret	NUR; 16	MAG	SIL	HOC	HUN	SPA	MNZ	17th	1
