= Alan van der Merwe =

South African racing driver (born 1980)

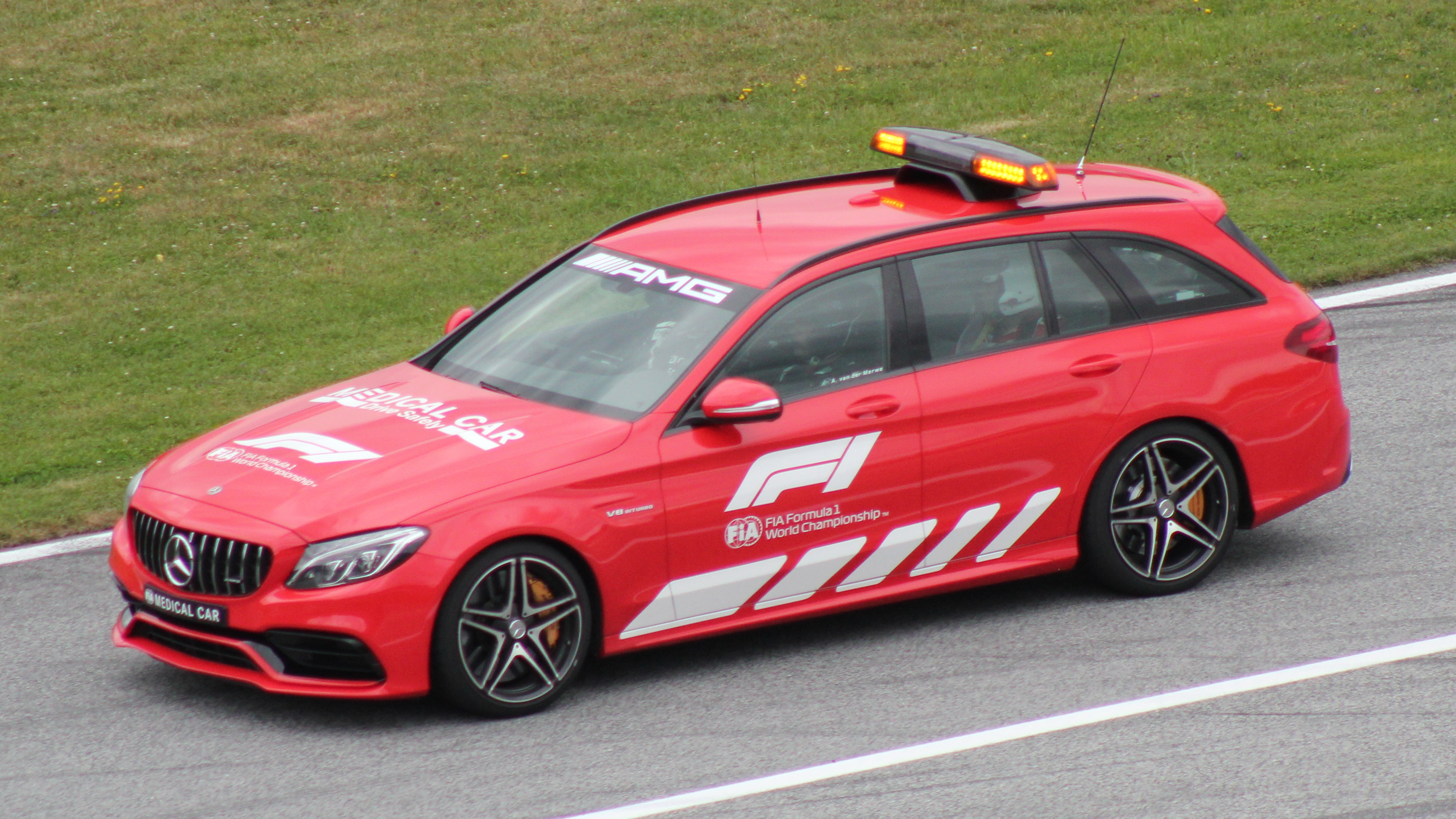
- Van der Merwe driving the medical car during the 2021 Austrian Grand Prix
- Nationality: (South Africa) South African
- Born: 31 January 1980 (age 46) Johannesburg, Transvaal, South Africa

Previous series
- 2008–09; 2008; 2006–07; 2004; 2002–03; 2001; 2001: A1 Grand Prix; Le Mans Series LMP2; A1 Grand Prix; Formula 3000; British Formula 3; British Formula Ford; Formula Ford Festival

Championship titles
- 2003: British Formula 3 Championship

Alan van der Merwe (born 31 January 1980) is a South African former racing driver. From 2009 to 2021, van der Merwe served as the medical car driver in Formula One.

== Racing career ==
Van der Merwe won the 2001 Formula Ford Festival. In 2003, he was the British Formula 3 Champion, and drove for Super Nova Racing in Formula 3000 in 2004. His sponsorship money ran out mid-season and he took a contract as a part-time tester for BAR–Honda.

In 2005 and 2006, van der Merwe raced in the A1 Grand Prix series for A1 Team South Africa, with a best placed finish of 7th in New Zealand. In 2006, he joined the Bonneville 200 MPH Club, driving a modified BAR–Honda 007 car to speeds in excess of 400 kilometres per hour (250 mph) for their Bonneville 400 project; an attempt to set an official land speed record for a Formula One car on the famous Bonneville Salt Flats. In 2008, he drove for James Watt Automotive in the 1000 km of Silverstone, part of the 2008 Le Mans Series, finishing in 33rd place and completing 159 laps. He returned to A1 Grand Prix in 2009 in the final round at Brands Hatch.

== FIA role ==
Van der Merwe was the official driver of the FIA medical car in Formula One events from 2009 until the end of the 2021 season, when he was replaced due to his refusal to be vaccinated against COVID-19.

== Racing record ==
Season	Series	Team name	Races	Poles	Wins	Points	Position
2001	Formula Ford Festival	Haywood Racing	1	0	1	NC	**1st**
2001	British Formula Ford Championship	Haywood Racing	14	2	1	?	**2nd**
2002	British Formula 3	Carlin Motorsport	30	0	1	98	8th
2003	British Formula 3	Carlin Motorsport	24	5	9	308	**1st**
2004	Formula 3000	Super Nova Racing	7	0	0	2	14th
2005	Formula One	BAR	Test driver				
2006–07	A1 Grand Prix	A1 Team South Africa	8	0	0	24	14th
2008	Le Mans Series	James Watt Automotive	1	0	0	2	37th
2008–09	A1 Grand Prix	A1 Team South Africa	2	0	0	19	14th

=== Complete International Formula 3000 results ===
(key) (Races in bold indicate pole position; races in italics indicate fastest lap.)

Year	Entrant	1	2	3	4	5	6	7	8	9	10	DC	Points	Ref
2004	Super Nova Racing	IMO; 8	CAT; 12	MON; 9	NUR; Ret	MAG; 9	SIL; 8	HOC; Ret	HUN	SPA	MNZ	14th	2	

=== Complete A1 Grand Prix results ===
(key) (Races in bold indicate pole position) (Races in italics indicate fastest lap)

Year	Entrant	1	2	3	4	5	6	7	8	9	10	11	12	13	14	15	16	17	18	19	20	21	22	DC	Points	Ref
2006–07	A1 Team South Africa	NED; SPR	NED; FEA	CZE; SPR	CZE; FEA	BEI; SPR	BEI; FEA	MYS; SPR	MYS; FEA	IDN; SPR; 9	IDN; FEA; Ret	NZL; SPR; 7	NZL; FEA; 16	AUS; SPR; 16	AUS; FEA; Ret	RSA; SPR	RSA; FEA	MEX; SPR	MEX; FEA	SHA; SPR; 8	SHA; FEA; 12	GBR; SPR	GBR; SPR	14th	24	
2008–09	A1 Team South Africa	NED; SPR	NED; FEA	CHN; SPR	CHN; FEA	MYS; SPR	MYS; FEA	NZL; SPR	NZL; FEA	RSA; SPR	RSA; FEA	POR; SPR	POR; FEA	GBR; SPR; 15	GBR; SPR; 11									14th	19	

Sporting positions
Preceded by Anthony Davidson	Formula Ford Festival; Winner; 2001	Succeeded by Jan Heylen
Preceded by Robbie Kerr	British Formula Three Champion; 2003	Succeeded by Nelson Piquet Jr.
