= Team Astromega =

Former Belgian racing team

(Belgium) Team Astromega
- Founded: 1995
- Team principal(s): (Belgium) Mikke Van Hool (Belgium) Werner Gillis
- Current series: A1 Grand Prix; Formula Renault 1.6 Belgium
- Former series: Superleague Formula; Euro Formula 3000; International Formula 3000
- Drivers' Championships: 2006 FR1.6 Belgium (Dolby); 2007 FR1.6 Belgium (Štāla)

Team Astromega was a racing team from Belgium, headquartered in Heist-op-den-Berg and created in 1995 by Mikke Van Hool. The team has competed in A1 Grand Prix, Formula Renault 1.6 Belgium and International Formula 3000.

== History ==
Team Astromega was created in 1995 by Belgian International Formula 3000 driver Mikke Van Hool, who wanted to drive in his own team. Since 1996, Sam Boyle has been the team manager.

In 2003, Werner Gillis, an expert in financial management, became co-team owner. The same year, Robby Arnott joined the team as chief engineer after working with DAMS racing team.

In 2003, a Belgian Formula Renault 1.6 championship was created and Astromega was selected to organise the technical assistance for the series rookie test with assistance of two drivers from normal and Indoor Karting. Later, in the 2006 championship, Astromega ran a car with British driver Craig Dolby who became champion. In 2007, Briton Jack Piper and Latvian Karlīne Štāla (who became the first ever woman to win a single seaters championship), were the team drivers.

Astromega has been involved in A1 Grand Prix since the inaugural season in 2005–06, managing A1 Team China and later A1 Team Portugal.

== Complete series results ==
A1 Grand Prix results
Year	Car	Team	Races	Wins	Poles	Fast laps	Points	T.C.
2005–06	Lola A1GP-Zytek	A1 Team China	22	0	0	0	6	22nd
2006–07	Lola A1GP-Zytek	A1 Team China	22	0	0	0	22	15th
2006–07	Lola A1GP-Zytek	A1 Team Portugal	8	0	0	0	10	17th
2007–08	Lola A1GP-Zytek	A1 Team China	20	0	0	4	55	13th
2008–09	A1GP-Ferrari	A1 Team China	14	0	0	0	18	7th

International Formula 3000 Championship Results
Year	Car	Drivers	Races	Wins	Poles	Fast laps	Points	D.C.	T.C.
1995	Reynard-Zytek Judd	(Belgium) Mikke van Hool	7	0	0	0	0	23rd	NC
1996	Lola-Zytek Judd	(Belgium) Marc Goossens	10	2	1	0	28	3rd	3rd
1996	Lola-Zytek Judd	(France) Guillaume Gomez	8	0	0	0	0	NC	3rd
1997	Lola-Zytek Judd	(France) Soheil Ayari	10	1	0	0	12	8th	7th
1997	Lola-Zytek Judd	(France) Boris Derichebourg		0	0	0	4	14th	7th
1998	Lola-Zytek Judd	(Uruguay) Gonzalo Rodríguez	12	2	0	2	33	3rd	4th
1998	Lola-Zytek Judd	(Argentina) Gastón Mazzacane	11	0	0	0	2	19th	4th
1999	Lola-Zytek	(Uruguay) Gonzalo Rodríguez	8	1	0	1	27	3rd	4th
1999	Lola-Zytek	(United Kingdom) Justin Wilson	10	0	0	0	2	18th	4th
2000	Lola-Zytek	(Spain) Fernando Alonso	10	1	1	2	17	4th	4th
2000	Lola-Zytek	(Belgium) Marc Goossens	4	0	0	1	6	11th	4th
2000	Lola-Zytek	(France) Fabrice Walfisch	6	0	0	0	0	NC	4th
2001	Lola-Zytek	(Italy) Giorgio Pantano	12	1	0	3	12	9th	7th
2001	Lola-Zytek	(United Kingdom) Dino Morelli	5	0	0	0	0	NC	7th
2001	Lola-Zytek	(Italy) Enrico Toccacelo	4	0	0	0	0	NC	7th
2001	Lola-Zytek	(Indonesia) Ananda Mikola	3	0	0	0	0	NC	7th
2002	Lola-Zytek Judd	(Brazil) Mario Haberfeld	12	0	0	0	18	7th	6th
2002	Lola-Zytek Judd	(Australia) Rob Nguyen	12	0	0	0	2	13th	6th
2003	Lola-Zytek Judd	(Germany) Tony Schmidt	10	0	0	0	14	10th	7th
2003	Lola-Zytek Judd	(Belgium) Jeffrey van Hooydonk	5	0	0	0	9	13th	7th
2003	Lola-Zytek Judd	(Republic of Ireland) Michael Keohane	2	0	0	0	0	NC	7th
2004	Lola-Zytek Judd	(Italy) Raffaele Giammaria	9	0	0	0	27	8th	9th
2004	Lola-Zytek Judd	(Belgium) Jan Heylen	4	0	0	0	1	15th	9th
2004	Lola-Zytek Judd	(Belgium) Nico Verdonck	9	0	0	0	1	15th	9th
2004	Lola-Zytek Judd	(Netherlands) Olivier Tielemans	5	0	0	0	0	NC	9th

Euro Formula 3000 results
Year	Car	Drivers	Races	Wins	Poles	Fast laps	Points	D.C.	T.C.
2005	Lola B02/50-Zytek	(Italy) Giacomo Ricci	8	0	0	1	33	3rd	4th
2005	Lola B02/50-Zytek	(Finland) Toni Vilander	10	1	1	1	12	4th †	4th
2006	Lola B02/50-Zytek	(Italy) Oliver Martini	2	0	0	0	6	9th †	7th
2006	Lola B02/50-Zytek	(Turkey) Jason Tahinci	2	0	0	0	4	16th	7th
2006	Lola B02/50-Zytek	(Brazil) Tuka Rocha	2	0	0	0	0	4th †	

Formula Renault 1.6 Belgium results
Year	Car	Drivers	Races	Wins	Poles	Fast laps	Points	D.C.	T.C.
2006	Tatuus-Renault	(United Kingdom) Craig Dolby	12	7	4		204	1st	6th
2007	Tatuus-Renault	(Latvia) Karline Stala	12	2	0	2	178	1st	2nd
2007	Tatuus-Renault	(United Kingdom) Jack Piper	12	0	0	1	89	8th	2nd

- † These drivers also drove for other teams during the season and their final positions include all team results.
- D.C. = Drivers' Championship position, T.C. = Teams' Championship position.

== Timeline ==
Type	1990s					2000s
Type	95	96	97	98	99	00	01	02	03	04	05	06	07	08
Formulas	International Formula 3000										Euro F3000
Formulas											A1 Grand Prix
Formulas												FR 1.6 Belgium
