= Can Artam =

Turkish racecar driver (born 1981)

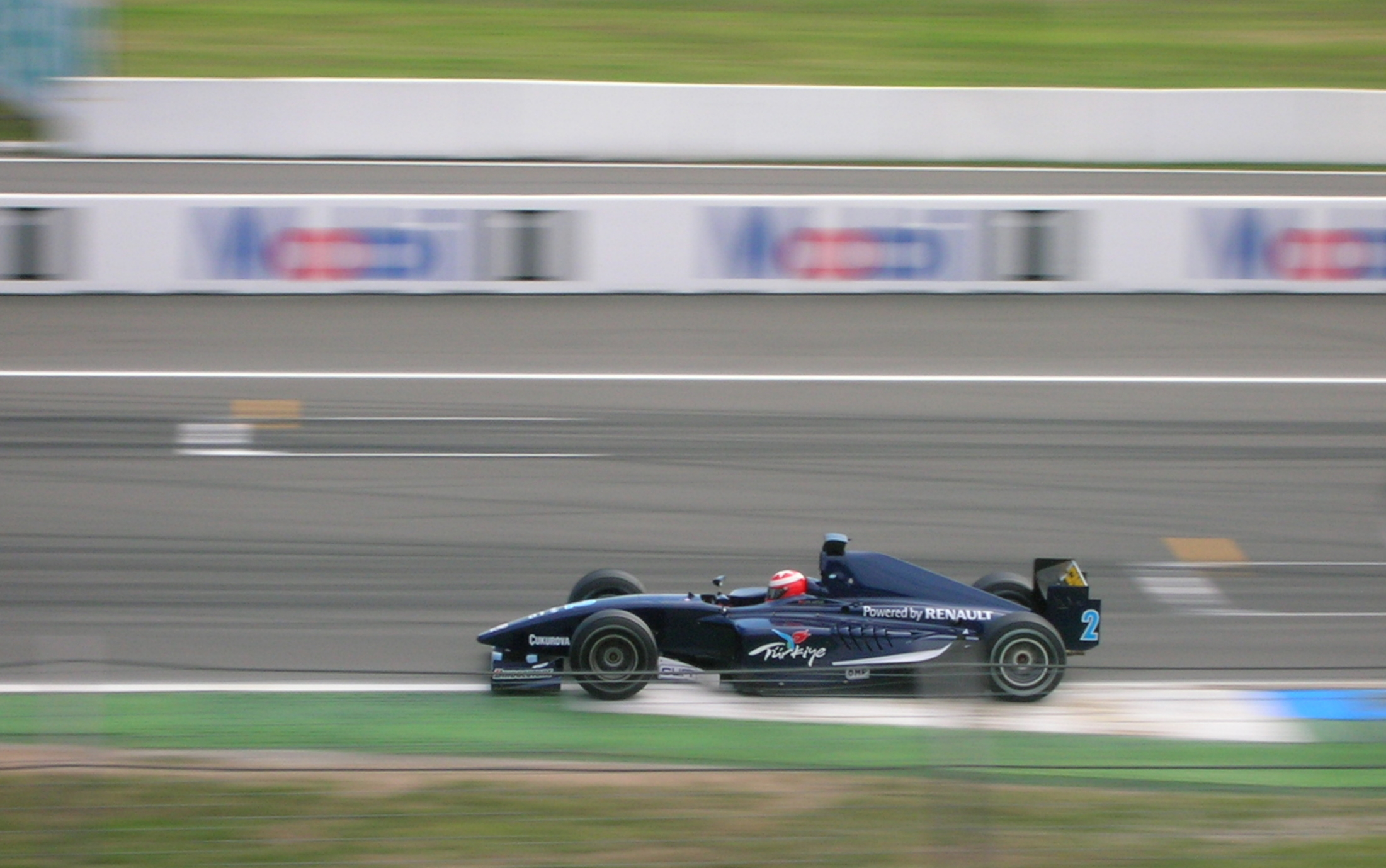
- Can Artam during the 2005 Hockenheimring GP2 Series round
- Nationality: Turkish
- Born: 30 June 1981 (age 45) Istanbul, Turkey

Can Artam (born 30 June 1981, in Istanbul) is a Turkish race car driver born into a car racing family. He raced in the 2005 GP2 Series for the iSport team and was the 2001 US Barber Formula Dodge champion.

== Career ==
Artam's career begun in karting in 1999, and he moved up to the Turkish Touring Car Championship in 2001. Later in the year he also raced in US Barber Formula Dodge, winning the title.

Artam remained in the TTCC in 2002, also racing in North American Fran Am 2000 Pro Championship and some races of Turkish Formula Three Championship, whilst returning to karting for some events. The Formula Renault would be the only series he would compete in during 2003, though with the new year seeing part seasons in both British Formula 3's National-Class and Formula Renault V6 Eurocup.

On 29 May 2004, Artam got his shot in Formula 3000 in Imola as the first Turkish driver racing in this category, driving part of the season for the Coloni team, and later driving some races for Super Nova. In 2005, he drove in GP2, the replacement series for F3000, for the iSport International team alongside Scott Speed, although without much success, scoring just two points with seventh place at the Monaco round of the inaugural GP2 championship. Until 2013, he did not in any major championships.

In 2013, Artam started racing again in the Turkish Touring Car Championship with Borusan Otomotiv Motorsport. He finished the first race of the season 3rd despite a flat tire.

== Racing record ==
=== Career summary ===
Season	Series	Team	Races	Wins	Poles	F/laps	Points	Position
2002	North American Fran Am 2000 Pro Championship	AutoTechnica	2	0	0	0	20	14th
2003	Formula Renault V6 Eurocup	EuroInternational	3	0	0	0	6	19th
2003	British Formula 3 International Series - Scholarship	Promatecme UK	5	0	0	0	35	7th
2004	International Formula 3000 Championship	Coloni Motorsport	9	0	0	0	0	19th
2005	GP2 Series	iSport International	24	0	0	0	2	22nd

=== Complete Formula Renault V6 Eurocup results ===
(key) (Races in bold indicate pole position; races in italics indicate fastest lap.)

Year	Entrant	1	2	3	4	5	6	7	8	9	10	11	12	13	14	15	16	17	18	DC	Points
2003	EuroInternational	CAT; 1	CAT; 2	MAG; 1	MAG; 2	MON	DON; 1	DON; 2	SPA1; 15	SPA2; 1; 8	SPA2; 2; 11	SCA; 1	SCA; 2	OSC; 1	OSC; 2	EST; 1	EST; 2	MNZ; 1	MNZ; 2	19th	6

=== Complete British Formula Three Championship results ===
(key) (Races in bold indicate pole position; races in italics indicate fastest lap.)

Year	Entrant	Chassis	Engine	Class	1	2	3	4	5	6	7	8	9	10	11	12	13	14	15	16	17	18	19	20	21	22	23	24	DC	Points
2003	Promatecme UK	Dallara F301	Mugen-Honda	Scholarship	DON; 1	DON; 2	SNE; 1	SNE; 2	CRO; 1	CRO; 2	KNO; 1	KNO; 2	SIL; 1	SIL; 2	CAS; 1	CAS; 2	OUL; 1; 18	OUL; 2 DNS	ROC; 1 Ret	ROC; 2; 12	THR; 1; 16	THR; 2 Ret	SPA; 1	SPA; 2	DON; 1	DON; 2	BRH; 1	BRH; 2	7th	35

=== Complete International Formula 3000 results ===
(key) (Races in bold indicate pole position; races in italics indicate fastest lap.)

Year	Entrant	1	2	3	4	5	6	7	8	9	10	DC	Points
2004	Coloni Motorsport	IMO; Ret	CAT; 10	MON; Ret	NUR; 13	MAG; Ret	SIL	HOC; 10				NC	0
2004	Super Nova Racing								HUN; 14	SPA; 13	MNZ; 9	NC	0

=== Complete GP2 Series results ===
(key) (Races in bold indicate pole position) (Races in italics indicate fastest lap)

Year	Entrant	1	2	3	4	5	6	7	8	9	10	11	12	13	14	15	16	17	18	19	20	21	22	23	DC	Points
2005	iSport International	IMO; FEA; 16	IMO; SPR; Ret	CAT; FEA; Ret	CAT; SPR; Ret	MON; FEA; 7	NÜR; FEA; 17	NÜR; SPR; Ret	MAG; FEA; 17	MAG; SPR; 16	SIL; FEA; 18	SIL; SPR; 14	HOC; FEA; Ret	HOC; SPR; 20	HUN; FEA; 14	HUN; SPR; 12	IST; FEA; 11	IST; SPR; 16	MNZ; FEA; 9	MNZ; SPR; 9	SPA; FEA; Ret	SPA; SPR; 22	BHR; FEA; 17	BHR; SPR; 16	22nd	2
