= Ma-con =

German racing team

(Germany) ma-con
- Founded: 2001; 25 years ago
- Team principal(s): Otto Schwadtke
- Former series: Formula Renault 2000 Eurocup; Formula Renault 2000 Germany; FIA Formula 3000; Italian F3000 Championship; German Formula 3 Formula 3 Euro Series; Austria Formula 3 Cup; ADAC Formel Masters; FIA Formula 3 European Championship
- Teams' Championships: ADAC Formel Masters: 2010
- Drivers' Championships: German Formula 3: 2012: André Rudersdorf (Trophy); Austria Formula 3 Cup: 2012: André Rudersdorf; ADAC Formel Masters: 2010: Richie Stanaway

ma-con is a German motor racing team. It was founded in 2001 by Marian Hamprecht. The team started racing in the Formula Renault 2000 Eurocup and Formula Renault 2000 Germany in 2002. Currently the team competes in the FIA Formula 3 European Championship. The team always focussed on regional and continental championships in Germany and Europe.

Over time, the team entered using different names, namely ma-con Motorsport, ma-con Racing and ma-con Engineering alongside the common ma-con name. For the 2011 ADAC Formel Masters season the team run a second entry named Krafft Walzen.

== History ==
Founded in 2001 by successful German F3 team manager Marian Hamprecht, the team run in multiple Formula 1 feeder series and gained multiple success in the lower categories of open-wheel racing. After an early campaign in the 2002 and 2003 Formula Renault 2000 Eurocup seasons, the team bought out the Den Blå Avis outfit and thus appeared on the grid of the 2004 FIA F3000 Championship. Despite finishing third in the team's standings in their rookie season and pushing series veteran Tomáš Enge to fourth in the driver's championship, the team discontinued their entry and rather supported Enge's 2005 IRL entry, while joining the Italian F3000 grid with an all-Czech team. Despite even more success in the Italian F3000, the team took a break from racing after 2005.

In 2008 the team joined the ADAC Formel Masters to build up a junior team spanning different tiers of feeder series, leading into the graduation of André Rudersdorf and Sven Müller within their team onto higher levels of open-wheel racing.

In order to re-gain momentum of their 2012 FIA Formula 3 European Championship campaign the team closed down their ADAC Formel Masters operation despite one driver's and one team's title. The team signed British drivers Emil Bernstorff and Tom Blomqvist. Blomqvist had two podiums, while Bernstorff had only one. The team finished fourth in the teams' championship of 2012 Formula 3 Euro Series. The team also participated with Rudersdorf in Austrian Formula 3 Cup and in the Trophy Class of the German Formula Three Championship. He won both titles.

This, however, didn't bring the success the team hoped for and stopped operating after the 2013 season. The team operated Christopher Höher's car in the Most round of the 2015 Remus F3 Cup in order to test Oreca F3 engine in the race conditions. He took one podium, but it was the only weekend for the ma-con crew, as in the Brno round Höher returned to Franz Wöss Racing's Dallara F308 Opel-Spiess.

In 2018 ma-con made the announcement to re-join FIA Formula 3 European Championship with German driver Julian Hanses after four-year break.

== Former series results ==
=== FIA European Formula 3 Championship ===
FIA Formula 3 European Championship
Year	Car	Drivers	Races	Wins	Poles	F/Laps	Points	D.C.	T.C.
2012	Dallara F312-Volkswagen	(United Kingdom) Tom Blomqvist	20	0	0	0	117	7th	N/A
2012	Dallara F312-Volkswagen	(United Kingdom) Emil Bernstorff	20	0	0	0	66	10th	N/A
2013	Dallara F312-Volkswagen	(Germany) Sven Müller	21	0	0	0	122	9th†	8th
2013	Dallara F312-Volkswagen	(Germany) André Rudersdorf	30	0	0	0	3	24th	8th
2013	Dallara F312-Volkswagen	(Monaco) Stefano Coletti	3	0	0	0	0	36th	8th
2018	Dallara F312-Volkswagen	(Germany) Julian Hanses	15	0	0	0	6	19th†	6th

† Shared results with Van Amersfoort Racing

* Season still in progress.

=== Formula Renault 2000 Eurocup/Masters ===
Formula Renault 2000 Eurocup
Year	Car	Drivers	Races	Wins	Poles	F/Laps	Points	D.C.	T.C.
2002	Tatuus-Renault	(Austria) Hannes Lachinger	9	0	0	1	20	14th	10th
2002	Tatuus-Renault	(Netherlands) Jos Menten	2	0	0	0	0	NC	10th
2002	Tatuus-Renault	(Greece) Alexandros Margaritis	2	0	0	0	0	NC	10th
2002	Tatuus-Renault	(Brazil) Andre Nicastro	2	0	0	0	0	NC	10th
2002	Tatuus-Renault	(Netherlands) Ross Zwolsman	2	0	0	0	0	NC	10th
Formula Renault 2000 Masters
2003	Tatuus-Renault	(Netherlands) Ross Zwolsman	4	0	0	0	16	16th	11th
2003	Tatuus-Renault	(Germany) Marcel Engels	3	0	0	1	4	25th	11th
2003	Tatuus-Renault	(Japan) Takuya Izawa	8	0	0	0	0	27th	11th
2003	Tatuus-Renault	(Germany) Thomas Weiss	2	0	0	0	0	52nd	11th

=== Formula Renault 2000 Germany ===
Formula Renault 2000 Germany
Year	Car	Drivers	Races	Wins	Poles	F/Laps	Points	D.C.
2002	Tatuus-Renault	(Netherlands) Ross Zwolsman	12	1	0	2	199	4th
2002	Tatuus-Renault	(Austria) Hannes Lachinger	14	1	1	0	159	6th
2002	Tatuus-Renault	(Germany) Thomas Westarp	12	0	0	0	64	20th
2002	Tatuus-Renault	(Netherlands) Jos Menten	14	0	0	0	71	18th
2002	Tatuus-Renault	(Japan) Takuya Izawa	2	0	0	0	2	37th
2002	Tatuus-Renault	(Switzerland) Benjamin Leuenberger	2	0	0	0	2	38th
2003	Tatuus-Renault	(Netherlands) Ross Zwolsman	8	0	0	0	76	15th
2003	Tatuus-Renault	(Japan) Takuya Izawa	14	0	0	2	145	7th

=== International Formula 3000 Series ===
International Formula 3000
Year	Car	Drivers	Races	Wins	Poles	F/Laps	Points	D.C.	T.C.
2004	Lola B02/50-Zytek Judd	(Czech Republic) Tomáš Enge	10	0	0	2	38	4th	3rd
2004	Lola B02/50-Zytek Judd	(Germany) Tony Schmidt	9	0	0	0	11	10th	3rd

=== Italian Formula 3000 Championship ===
Italian Formula 3000 Championship
Year	Car	Drivers	Races	Wins	Poles	F/Laps	Points	D.C.	T.C.
2005	Lola B99/50-Zytek Judd	(Czech Republic) Jarek Janis	7	1	2	0	43	2nd	2nd
2005	Lola B99/50-Zytek Judd	(Czech Republic) Jan Charouz	6	0	0	0	10	11th	2nd
2005	Lola B99/50-Zytek Judd	(Germany) Michael Vorba	2	0	0	0	1	22nd†	2nd

† Shared results with Sighinolfi

=== ADAC Formel Masters ===
ADAC Formel Masters
Year	Car	Drivers	Races	Wins	Poles	F/Laps	Points	D.C.	T.C.
2008	Dallara Formulino-Volkswagen	(Denmark) Marco Sørensen	8	4	5	3	125	4th	5th
2008	Dallara Formulino-Volkswagen	(United States) Liam Kenney	1	0	0	0	4	20th	5th
2008	Dallara Formulino-Volkswagen	(India) Ashwin Sundar	14	0	0	0	3	22nd	5th
2009	Dallara Formulino-Volkswagen	(United Kingdom) Adrian Campfield	16	4	3	2	187	3rd	2nd
2009	Dallara Formulino-Volkswagen	(New Zealand) Richie Stanaway	6	0	1	0	52	8th	2nd
2009	Dallara Formulino-Volkswagen	(United States) Liam Kenney	10	0	2	0	44	9th	2nd
2010	Dallara Formulino-Volkswagen	(New Zealand) Richie Stanaway	18	12	2	8	315	1st	1st
2010	Dallara Formulino-Volkswagen	(Germany) Mario Farnbacher	21	3	1	1	231	3rd	1st
2010	Dallara Formulino-Volkswagen	(France) William Vermont	21	0	1	1	165	4th	1st
2010	Dallara Formulino-Volkswagen	(Denmark) Christina Nielsen	6	0	0	0	1	17th	1st
2011	Dallara Formulino-Volkswagen	(Germany) Sven Müller	24	4	1	1	296	3rd	2nd
2011	Dallara Formulino-Volkswagen	(Germany) Mario Farnbacher	24	1	0	3	173	6th†	2nd
2011	Dallara Formulino-Volkswagen	(Germany) Maximilian Buhk	24	0	0	1	87	9th†	2nd
2011	Dallara Formulino-Volkswagen	(Denmark) Dennis Lind	10	0	0	0	83	10th	2nd
2011	Dallara Formulino-Volkswagen	(Germany) André Rudersdorf	24	0	0	0	12	19th	2nd
2011	Dallara Formulino-Volkswagen	(Germany) Niklas Brinkmann	12	0	0	0	9	21st	2nd
2011	Dallara Formulino-Volkswagen	(New Zealand) Nick Cassidy	3	0	0	0	8	22nd	2nd
2011	Dallara Formulino-Volkswagen	(Denmark) Christina Nielsen	24	0	0	0	4	24th	2nd

- Notes: Brinkmann, Rudersdorf and Nielsen competed for ma-con's second entry, Krafft Walzen. However, they had to switch to ma-con's main team for the Austrian round, as the deal with Krafft Walzen didn't include races in another country and thus are all included in ma-con's statistics.

† Shared results with other teams

=== Formula 3 Euro Series ===
Formula 3 Euro Series
Year	Car	Drivers	Races	Wins	Poles	F/Laps	Points	D.C.	T.C.
2012	Dallara F312-Volkswagen	(United Kingdom) Tom Blomqvist	24	0	0	0	157.5	7th	4th
2012	Dallara F312-Volkswagen	(United Kingdom) Emil Bernstorff	24	0	0	0	91	10th	4th

=== German Formula 3 Trophy Class ===
German Formula Three Championship Trophy Class
Year	Car	Drivers	Races	Wins	Poles	F/Laps	Points	D.C.
2012	Dallara F305-Volkswagen	(Germany) André Rudersdorf	24	14	0	0	377	1st

=== Austria Formula 3 Cup/Remus F3 Cup ===
Austria Formula 3 Cup
Year	Car	Drivers	Races	Wins	Poles	F/Laps	Points	D.C.
2012	Dallara F305-Volkswagen	(Germany) André Rudersdorf	12	7	7	0	212	1st
Remus F3 Cup
2015	Dallara F312-Oreca	(Austria) Christopher Höher	8	2	1	1	113	5th†

† Shared results with the other team

== Timeline ==
Former series
Formula Renault 2000 Eurocup	2002–2003
Formula Renault 2.0 Germany	2002–2003
International Formula 3000	2004
Italian Formula 3000	2005
ADAC Formel Masters	2008–2011
Formula 3 Euro Series	2012
German Formula Three Championship	2012
Austria Formula 3 Cup	2012, 2015
FIA Formula 3 European Championship	2012–2013, 2018
