= BAR 006 =

Formula One racing car

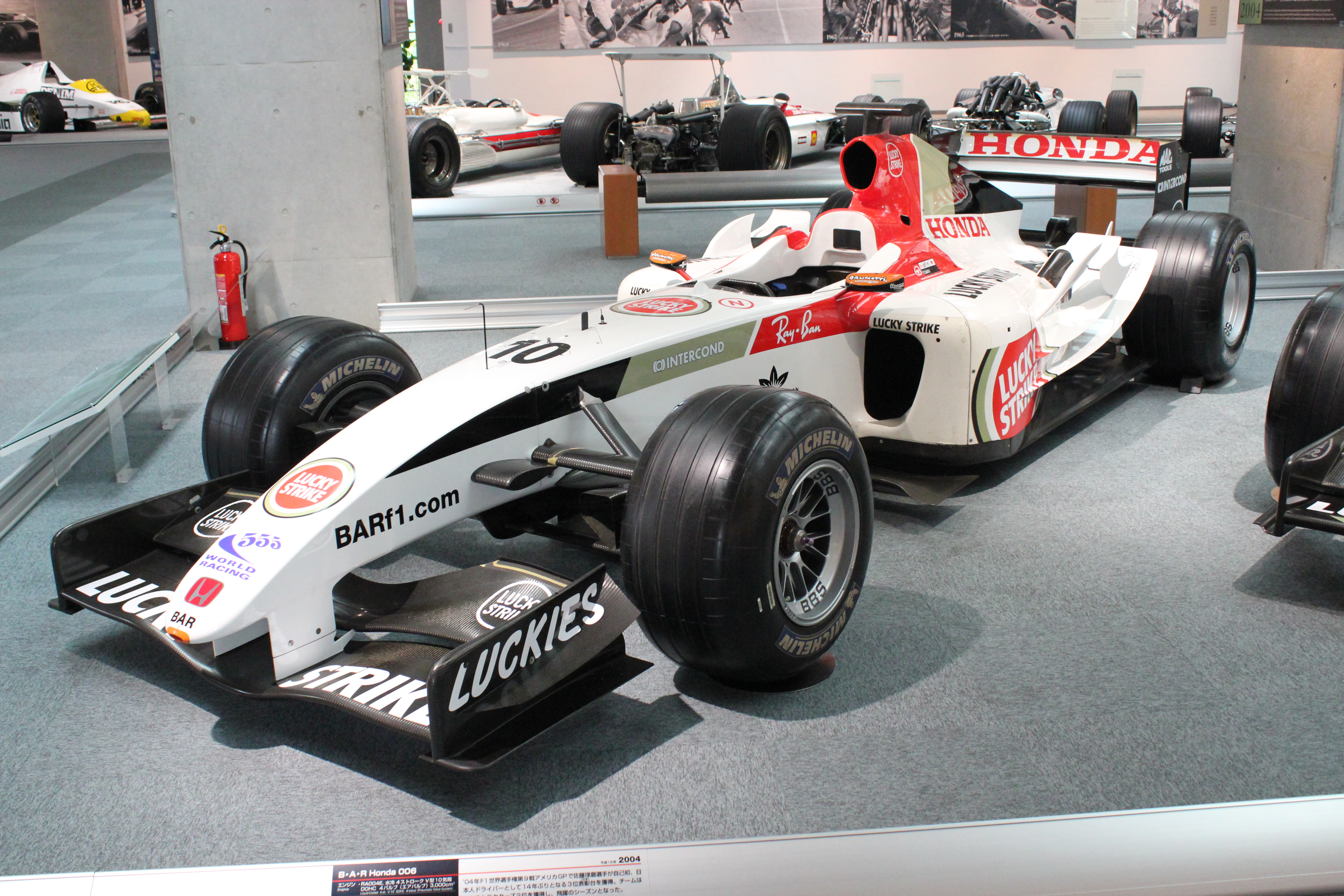
- The BAR 006 of Takuma Sato
- Category: Formula One
- Constructor: BAR-Honda
- Designers: Geoff Willis (Technical Director); Gary Savage (Deputy Technical Director); Kevin Taylor (Chief Engineer, Composites and Structures); Willem Toet (Chief Engineer, Aerodynamics and Development); Mark Ellis (Chief Engineer, Vehicle Performance); Ian Wright (Chief Engineer, Vehicle Dynamics); Jörg Zander (Chief Engineer, Transmission and Mechanical); Simon Lacey (Head of Aerodynamics); Mariano Alperin (Chief Aerodynamicist); Takeo Kiuchi (Engine Project Leader - Honda)
- Predecessor: 005
- Successor: 007

Technical specifications
- Chassis: Composite monocoque
- Suspension (front): Double wishbones, push rod-operated torsion springs and dampers
- Suspension (rear): Double wishbones, push rod-operated torsion springs and dampers
- Engine: Honda RA004E 3,000 cc (183.1 cu in) 90° V10, naturally aspirated, mid-mounted
- Transmission: X-Trac 7-speed sequential semi-automatic
- Power: 940-960 hp @ 18,700 RPM
- Fuel: Elf
- Lubricants: ENEOS
- Tyres: Michelin

Competition history
- Notable entrants: Lucky Strike BAR Honda
- Notable drivers: 9. (United Kingdom) Jenson Button; 10. (Japan) Takuma Sato
- Debut: 2004 Australian Grand Prix
- Last event: 2004 Brazilian Grand Prix
Races	Wins	Podiums	Poles	F/Laps
18	0	11	1	0
- Constructors' Championships: 0
- Drivers' Championships: 0

The BAR 006 was a Formula One car that competed in the 2004 Formula One season. The car was driven by Jenson Button and Takuma Sato, and the official test driver was Anthony Davidson. The car scored 11 podiums and a single pole position, with the BAR-Honda team finishing second in the 2004 championship. The BAR-Honda 006 was officially launched at Circuit de Catalunya, Spain on 1 February.

== Season ==
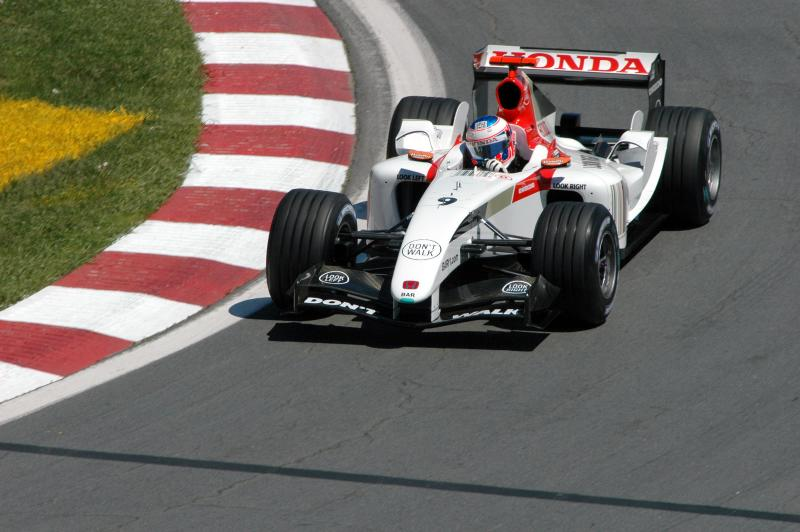
Button driving the 006 at the Canadian Grand Prix

From the onset of the season, the car proved to be very competitive with Jenson Button scoring six podiums from the first eight races, including his first podium in Malaysia as well as his first pole position in Imola. The podiums continued with Takuma Sato becoming the first Japanese driver to score a podium since 1990 at Indianapolis and Button taking four further podiums in the latter stages of the season. Overall the car scored 11 podiums and one pole position.

After a close fight with Renault, BAR-Honda finished second in the Constructors' Championship, beating every team except Ferrari. Button, who many tipped as driver of the year, finished third in the Drivers' Championship. Despite some reliability problems for Sato, he finished eighth in the Drivers' Championship, the best-ever result for a Japanese and Asian driver in Formula One.

Launch control and fully-automatic gearboxes were also banned for 2004, which had been used by the team for the previous three seasons, since their reintroduction at the 2001 Spanish Grand Prix.

== Sponsorship and livery ==
The team's third driver, Anthony Davidson, drove the Spanish, Italian and Brazilian friday practice sessions with a new colouring. FIA regulations allowed the third car to have a different livery from the race cars; the task was to create a design for title sponsor Lucky Strike that showed the progression of the livery over the last few years, and also to come up with a new concept. In Spain, a black and white colour scheme appeared on Davidson's car. In Italy, Davidson's car had an x-ray effect that incorrectly showed the driver's feet. In Brazil, there was a "graffiti"-style paint job that included Davidson's own face, and on the side of the car the words "Brazil 04".

In China, team owner British American Tobacco wanted to promote its 555 branding and thus all team members, including all three drivers, wore special blue-yellow overalls and clothing throughout the weekend. Davidson drove a blue-yellow 555-coloured car in Friday's practice. Button and Sato drove all weekend with the traditional red and white Lucky Strike-coloured car.

BAR used the 'Lucky Strike' logos, except at the Canadian, French, and British Grands Prix, and '555' logos in China.

At the Japanese Grand Prix, BAR celebrated their 100th Grand Prix, and their cars had a sticker on the nose cone commemorating the achievement, reading "one hundred grands prix".

== BAR 05 Concept Car ==
During the 2004-2005 offseason, BAR used the 05 Concept Car, a modified version of the 006, notably featuring a black and gray livery, the Honda RA005E engine from the following season, as well as the rear end of the future 007.

== Complete Formula One results ==
(key) (results in bold indicate pole position, results in italics indicate fastest lap)

Year	Entrant	Engine	Tyres	Drivers	1	2	3	4	5	6	7	8	9	10	11	12	13	14	15	16	17	18	Points	WCC
2004	Lucky Strike BAR Honda	Honda RA004E V10	**MI**		AUS	MAL	BHR	SMR	ESP	MON	EUR	CAN	USA	FRA	GBR	GER	HUN	BEL	ITA	CHN	JPN	BRA	119	2nd
2004	Lucky Strike BAR Honda	Honda RA004E V10	**MI**	(United Kingdom) Jenson Button	6	3	3	**2**	8	2	3	3	Ret	5	4	2	5	Ret	3	2	3	Ret	119	2nd
2004	Lucky Strike BAR Honda	Honda RA004E V10	**MI**	(Japan) Takuma Sato	9	15^{†}	5	16^{†}	5	Ret	Ret	Ret	3	Ret	11	8	6	Ret	4	6	4	6	119	2nd
