= BAR 007 =

Formula One racing car

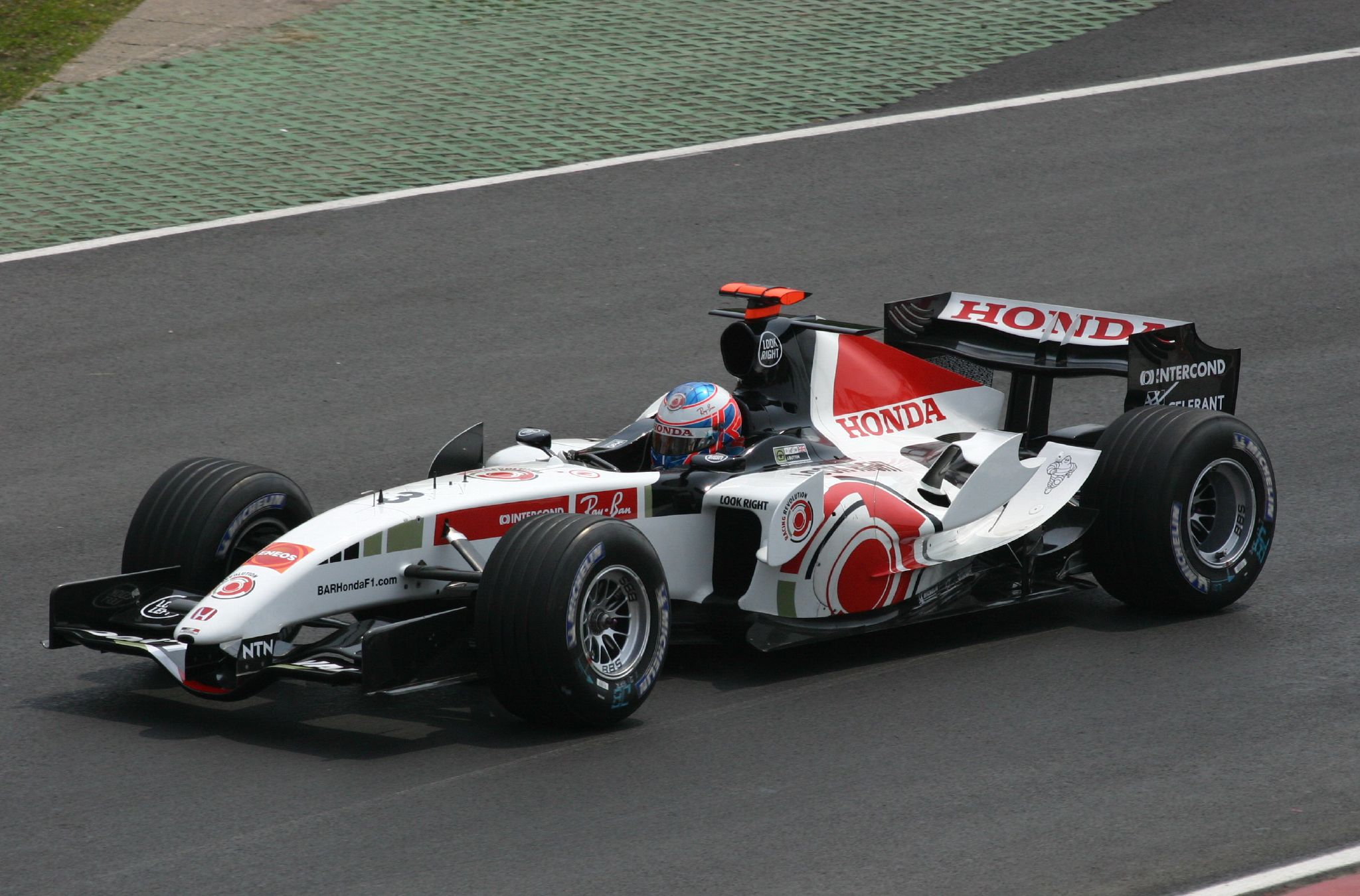
- Jenson Button driving the BAR 007 at the 2005 Canadian Grand Prix
- Category: Formula One
- Constructor: BAR-Honda
- Designers: Geoff Willis (Technical Director); Gary Savage (Deputy Technical Director); Kevin Taylor (Chief Engineer, Composites and Structures); Willem Toet (Chief Engineer, Aerodynamics and Development); Mark Ellis (Chief Engineer, Vehicle Performance); Ian Wright (Chief Engineer, Vehicle Dynamics); Jörg Zander (Chief Engineer, Transmission and Mechanical); Simon Lacey (Head of Aerodynamics); Mariano Alperin (Chief Aerodynamicist); Takeo Kiuchi (Engine Project Leader - Honda)
- Predecessor: BAR 006
- Successor: Honda RA106

Technical specifications
- Chassis: Carbon Fibre Monocoque
- Suspension (front): Double wishbone with pushrod-activated torsion springs and rockers, Showa dampers
- Suspension (rear): Double wishbone with pushrod-activated torsion springs and rockers, Showa dampers
- Length: 4,675 mm (184.1 in)
- Width: 1,800 mm (70.9 in)
- Height: 950 mm (37.4 in)
- Axle track: Front : 1,460 mm (57.5 in); Rear : 1,420 mm (55.9 in)
- Wheelbase: 3,140 mm (123.6 in)
- Engine: Honda RA005E 3.0 L (183.1 cu in) V10 (90°). Naturally-aspirated, mid-mounted.
- Transmission: Honda-Xtrac 7-speed seamless-shift sequential semi-automatic paddle-shift
- Power: 965-1000 hp @ 19,000 rpm
- Weight: 600 kg (1,322.8 lb) or more
- Fuel: ENEOS
- Lubricants: ENEOS
- Brakes: Caliper : alcon Disc : Brembo Carbon Industrie
- Tyres: Michelin; BBS Wheels

Competition history
- Notable entrants: Lucky Strike BAR Honda
- Notable drivers: 3. (United Kingdom) Jenson Button; 4. (Japan) Takuma Sato; 4. (United Kingdom) Anthony Davidson
- Debut: 2005 Australian Grand Prix
- Last event: 2005 Chinese Grand Prix
Races	Wins	Podiums	Poles	F/Laps
17	0	2	1	0
- Constructors' Championships: 0
- Drivers' Championships: 0

The BAR 007 was a Formula One car developed and used by British American Racing for the 2005 Formula One season. The car was driven by Jenson Button and Takuma Sato, but Sato was replaced by test driver Anthony Davidson for the Malaysian Grand Prix when he caught the flu. Enrique Bernoldi shared Davidson's test driver role throughout the season.

== Design and history ==
The 007 was a clear evolution of the BAR 006, which had been highly successful for the team, leading to their second place in the 2004 championship behind Ferrari. The new 007 car was a much tighter design and overall it was smaller than the previous 006. BAR designers also managed to save significant weight over the 006 car, despite greater safety testing being required for the 2005 season.

The engine and gearbox were not left untouched either. For the 2005 season, engines had to last 2 races. Honda created a brand new V10 unit, which was smaller, lighter, and had a better centre of gravity than the 2004 engine. The gearbox was also an evolution of the 2004 unit, with some modifications to allow it to fit in better with the new tight design. Halfway through the 2005 season, BAR introduced a multi-profile front wing.

At the end of the 2005 season, Honda, the engine partner since 2000, secured 100% team ownership, purchasing it from British American Tobacco, the long term sponsor of the team. The cars would remain with the BAT sponsorship throughout 2006.

The BAR 007 was also the first Formula One car to use a seamless-shift gearbox.

== Racing history ==
The team had a poor start to the season, and were involved in controversy over the minimum weight of their cars (see below), and were disqualified from one race, banned from another two, and also did not start in Indianapolis due to use of Michelin tyres. The team failed to score a point until the French Grand Prix. However, the team's fortunes were turning slightly, and Jenson Button scored points in all of the last 10 races, including two podium finishes. However, Takuma Sato only scored one point in the entire season and was subsequently fired from the team.

== Controversy ==
Both BAR-Hondas were disqualified from the San Marino Grand Prix after it was found the cars could run below the minimum weight, stated by the FIA regulations of 605 kg. BAR disagreed with the report, claiming the cars could not run with less than 6 kg of fuel, therefore that pushed them over the minimum weight. They also claimed that they thought it was during race weight the rules meant, not in post-race scrutineering. The FIA decided to punish the team, banning them from two races, including the Monaco Grand Prix. Unable to compete in Monaco, Jenson Button commentated for ITV F1's broadcast of the Grand Prix. BAR were going to contest the disqualification, but later changed their minds. Max Mosley wanted to have the team disqualified from the entire season.

Following the controversy, the team also did not start the United States Grand Prix as the team was asked by tyre supplier Michelin to withdraw from the race due to tyre problems affecting all Michelin-based teams; BAR had not scored a point at this point.

== Sponsorship and livery ==
BAR used the Lucky Strike logos, except in countries that had a ban on tobacco advertising (Canadian, United States, French, British, Turkish, Italian and Belgian Grands Prix; in these competitions they were replaced with the "Racing Revolution" logo). At the Hungarian Grand Prix, BAR ran with the Lucky Strike livery on Friday and Saturday, but removed it for the race. In China, it had 555 logos on the car in place of Lucky Strike.

At the Italian and Belgian Grand Prix, the cars featured the Bonneville 400 and Speed Freek logos.

== BAR 007B ==
During the 2005-2006 off-season, Honda, having purchased BAR, entered a B version of the 007 to test the 2006 Honda RA806E V8 engine. The car was driven by Anthony Davidson.

== Speed record attempt ==
On 21 July 2006, Honda used the car to achieve a top speed of 397.481 km/h (246.983 mph) at the Bonneville Salt Flats. Driving the car was test driver and former Formula One medical car driver Alan van der Merwe.

== Gallery ==
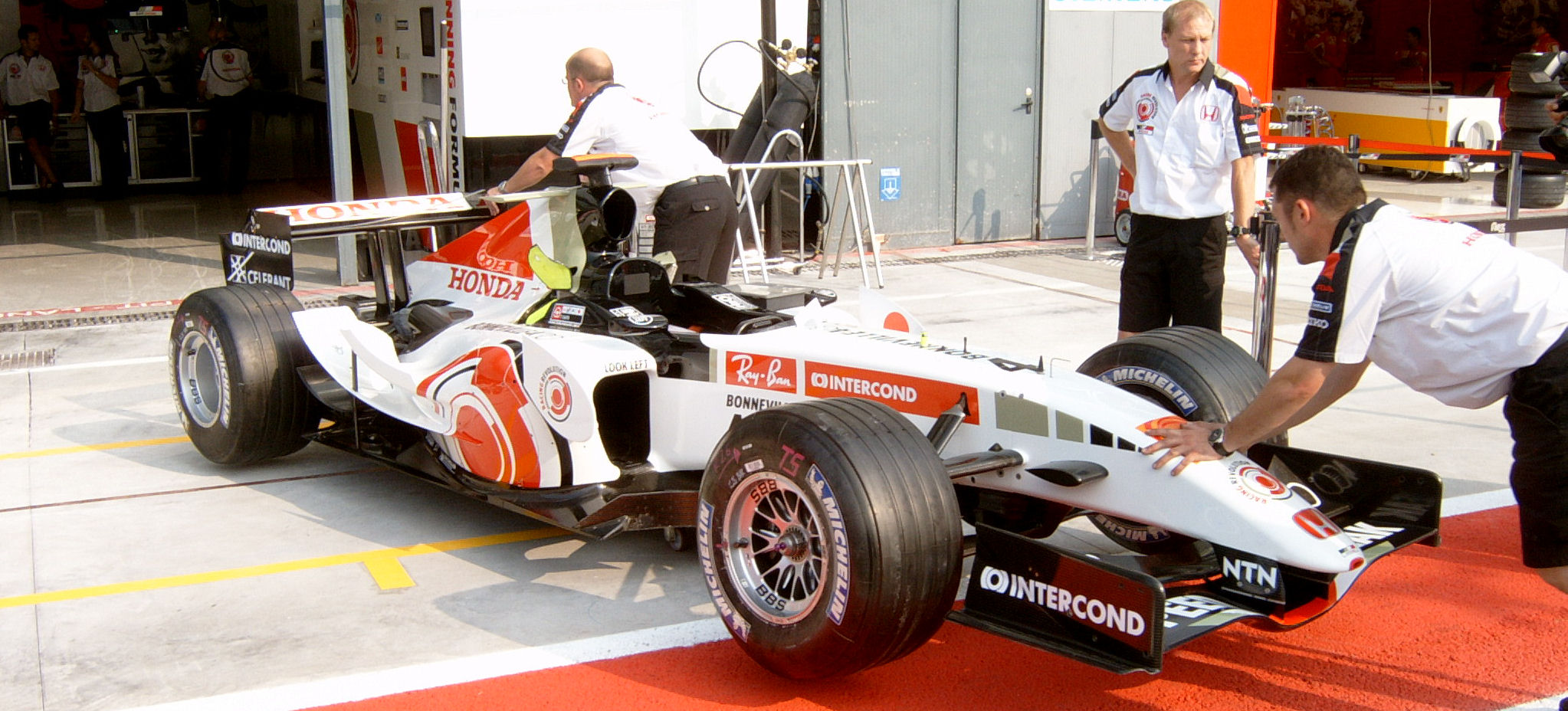
The BAR 007.

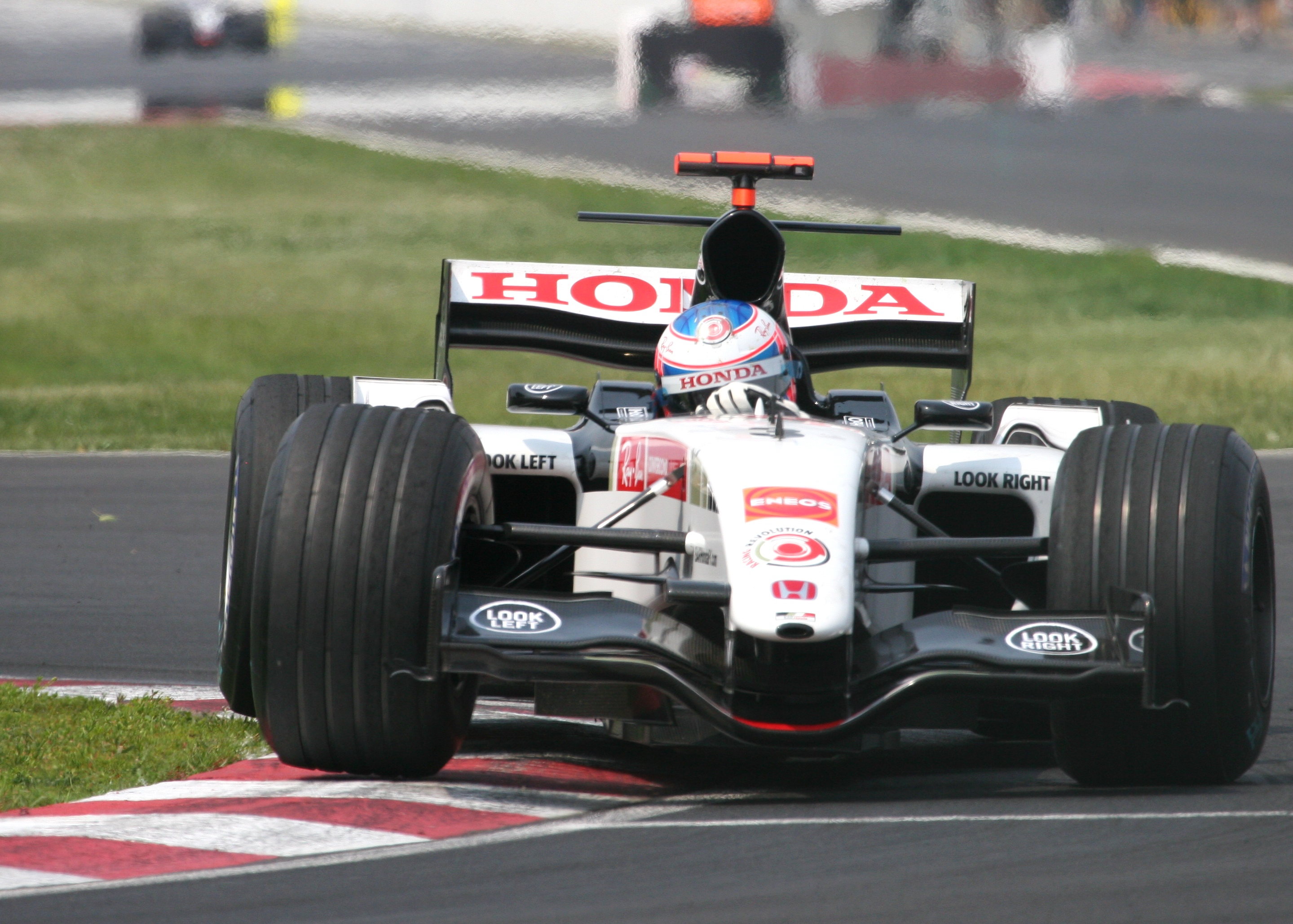
Jenson Button driving the 007 at the 2005 Canadian Grand Prix.

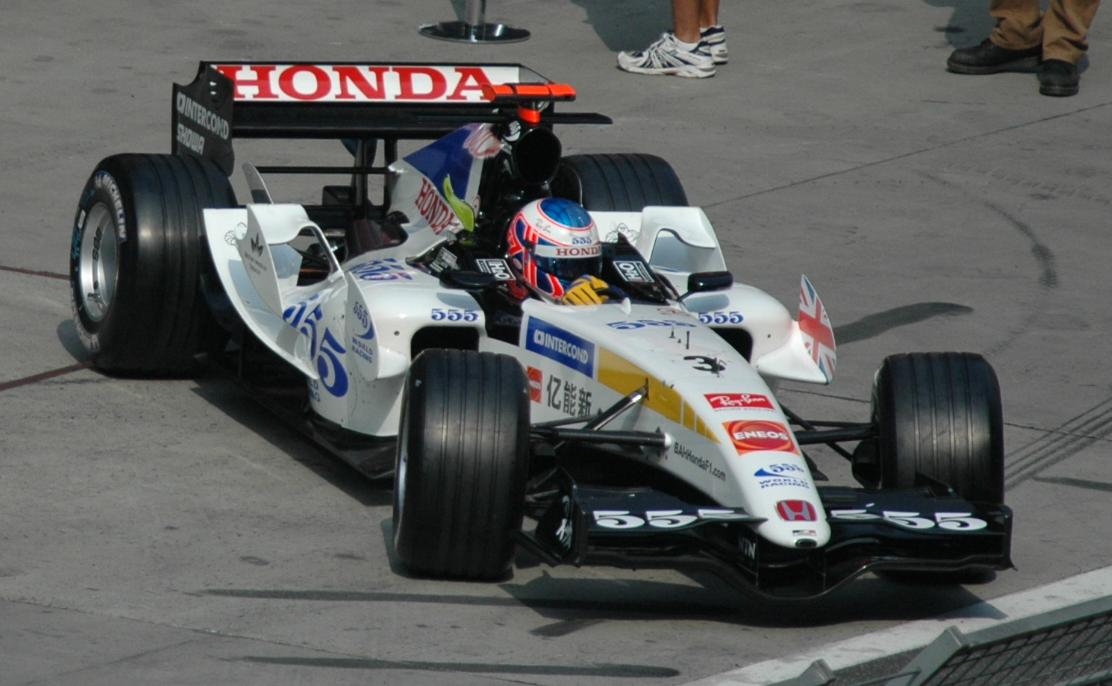
Jenson Button in the 2005 Chinese Grand Prix with 555 livery.

== Complete Formula One results ==
(key) (results in bold indicate pole position, results in italics indicate fastest lap)

Year	Chassis	Engine	Tyres	Drivers	1	2	3	4	5	6	7	8	9	10	11	12	13	14	15	16	17	18	19	Points	WCC
2005	BAR 007	Honda RA005E V10	**M**		AUS	MAL	BHR	SMR	ESP	MON	EUR	CAN	USA	FRA	GBR	GER	HUN	TUR	ITA	BEL	BRA	JPN	CHN	38	6th
2005	BAR 007	Honda RA005E V10	**M**	(United Kingdom) Jenson Button	11	Ret	Ret	DSQ			10	**Ret**	DNS	4	5	3	5	5	8	3	7	5	8	38	6th
2005	BAR 007	Honda RA005E V10	**M**	(Japan) Takuma Sato	14	PO	Ret	DSQ			12	Ret	DNS	11	16	12	8	9	16	Ret	10	DSQ	Ret	38	6th
2005	BAR 007	Honda RA005E V10	**M**	(United Kingdom) Anthony Davidson	TD	Ret	TD	TD			TD	TD	TD	TD	TD	TD	TD	TD	TD	TD	TD	TD	TD	38	6th
