= BAR 003 =

2001 Formula One season car

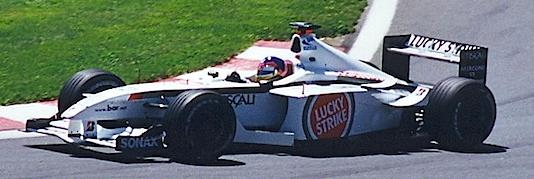
- Jacques Villeneuve driving the BAR 003 at the 2001 Canadian Grand Prix
- Category: Formula One
- Constructor: BAR
- Designers: Adrian Reynard (Executive Engineer); Malcolm Oastler (Technical Director); Gary Savage (Head of Design - Composites); Andrew Green (Head of Design - Mechanical); Jason Rees (Head of Electronics); Willem Toet (Senior Aerodynamicist); Simon Lacey (Senior Aerodynamicist)
- Predecessor: 002
- Successor: 004

Technical specifications
- Chassis: Carbon-fibre monocoque
- Suspension (front): independent, pushrod-activated, inboard spring
- Suspension (rear): independent, pushrod-activated, inboard spring
- Engine: Honda RA001E 3.0-litre V10 (80°) naturally aspirated mid-engine
- Transmission: BAR/Xtrac 6-speed longitudinal semi-automatic sequential
- Power: 800 hp @ 17,000 rpm
- Fuel: ENEOS
- Lubricants: Nisseki Mitsubishi
- Tyres: Bridgestone

Competition history
- Notable entrants: Lucky Strike BAR Honda
- Notable drivers: 9. (France) Olivier Panis; 10. (Canada) Jacques Villeneuve
- Debut: 2001 Australian Grand Prix
- Last event: 2001 Japanese Grand Prix
Races	Wins	Poles	F/Laps
17	0	0	0
- Constructors' Championships: 0
- Drivers' Championships: 0

The BAR 003 was the car with which the British American Racing team competed in the 2001 Formula One season. It was driven by Jacques Villeneuve, who was in his third year with the team, and Olivier Panis, who joined from a year out of racing as McLaren's test driver. The team had four test drivers who were Anthony Davidson, Darren Manning, Patrick Lemarié and Takuma Sato. The BAR 003 was officially launched at London, England on 26 January.

== Design ==
The car was designed by Malcolm Oastler, who made use of the collaboration of Andrew Green of Reynard, an engineer with whom Jacques Villeneuve and Craig Pollock had already triumphed in the Indianapolis 500 and the 1995 American Formula Cart. In the field of aerodynamic development, the person responsible was Willem Toet, already at BAR since 1999. The project was conservative and the car was adapted to the new regulations: a curious spoon-shaped nose was introduced, with very thick and rounded profiles in the junction of the central part.

Small horizontal fins were thus positioned on the nose, with the aim of moving part of the aerodynamic load onto the rear axle: these small wing supports were not only present on the sides of the nose, but also between the suspensions and the steering rods. In the upper part of the nose, the fins took on an arrow shape pointing backwards and this also created some small assembly problems for the technicians. The other two small aerofoils, housed between the front suspension triangles and the steering rods, appeared to be similar to those on the nose, but in this case the arrow tips were facing forward. The rear wing was renewed and characterized by the bulkheads cut in the upper part.

The bellies, due to the new crash tests, became even more robust compared to the already voluminous ones of the 002: the air inlets on the sides were modified, with more rounded and less squared shapes, allowing greater generosity for cooling of the Honda RA001E engine, credited with approximately 815 HP. The air intake on the roof for feeding the engine was modified: it became triangular and no longer round like on the 002, while the exhausts were kept in the traditional low position above the side channels. In the winter tests the car proved to be reliable, but Villeneuve found it slower and unstable than the 002: in particular, the Canadian driver's doubts were linked to the excessive rigidity of the rear axle; on the contrary, Panis judged the car to be a success, maintaining however that the engine would have needed a few more horsepower to be able to play a leading role; the car was equipped with Bridgestone tyres. On the eve of the season, BAR's hope was to become the third force in the championship behind Ferrari and McLaren and to win some Grand Prix, while the more immediate objective was to beat Jordan who used the same engines, although Honda technicians would have guaranteed greater technical assistance to Craig Pollock's team.

== Racing history ==
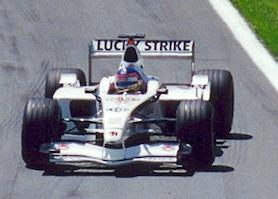
Jacques Villeneuve driving the 003 at the 2001 Canadian Grand Prix.

The best results were Villeneuve's two surprising third places in Spain and Germany. Fourth place in Monaco and a sixth in Monza by Villeneuve, and a fourth and fifth place obtained by Panis in Brazil and Austria. The BAR 003 with Villeneuve was also the protagonist of a terrible accident in Australia, which caused the former Canadian world champion to shift a vertebra and above all the death of a track marshal, struck by a wheel that detached from the single-seater.

During the season the car proved to be reasonably reliable, but in terms of speed it offered few high points and generally settled in positions ranging from seventh to eleventh. The BAR 003 paid above all for the poor speed on a single lap in qualifying, due to an engine that tended to cool down too quickly and which forced the team to start far away from the first six places too many times, nullifying a fairly solid behavior in the race. In fact, the year that was expected by many as the year of consolidation at the top of Formula 1 was not satisfactory. The BAR, despite the prestigious podiums signed by Villeneuve, lost, albeit slightly, the direct comparison with the Jordan powered by the same Honda engine. 2001 was the last year of Pollock, within the team.

The team eventually finished sixth in the Constructors' Championship, with 17 points.

== Sponsorship and livery ==
After the two-tone livery of 1999 and the ice white paint of 2000, the BAR colors for 2001 settled on a strong and classic white color. The car was also decorated, on both sides, with a line composed mostly of black and a minority of red and dark khaki, which extended from the nose to the rear axle, also incorporating the rear-view mirrors. The side bulkheads of the two ailerons were painted black. As in 2000, the main sponsor was the cigarette brand Lucky Strike followed by 555, while the new sponsorship of Tiscali was to be registered. As for the race numbers, the team's first driver Villeneuve chose the number ten instead of nine, which thus went to Panis.

BAR used Lucky Strike logos, except at the French and British Grands Prix where in France and Britain Lucky Strike was covered up and replaced with half a barcode and in the United States with the "British American Racing" logo and the cars were also adorned with the "USA 2001" logo. At the same event, BAR remembered Alex Zanardi who was injured in the Lausitz race with a logo featuring a coconut pineapple and the text "Alex our thoughts and prayers are with you!".

EA Sports logos were added to the cars at the United States and Japanese Grands Prix.

== Complete Formula One results ==
(key) (results in bold indicate pole position, results in italics indicate fastest lap)

Year	Team	Engine	Tyres	Drivers	1	2	3	4	5	6	7	8	9	10	11	12	13	14	15	16	17	Points	WCC
2001	BAR	Honda V10	**B**		AUS	MAL	BRA	SMR	ESP	AUT	MON	CAN	EUR	FRA	GBR	GER	HUN	BEL	ITA	USA	JPN	17	6th
2001	BAR	Honda V10	**B**	(France) Olivier Panis	7	Ret	4	8	7	5	Ret	Ret	Ret	9	Ret	7	Ret	11	9	11	13	17	6th
2001	BAR	Honda V10	**B**	(Canada) Jacques Villeneuve	Ret	Ret	7	Ret	3	8	4	Ret	9	Ret	8	3	9	8	6	Ret	10	17	6th
