= Adrian Reynard =

British businessman and astronaut

- Born: 23 March 1951 (age 75); Welwyn, England
- Occupation: Founder of Reynard Motorsport
- Spouse: Gill Reynard
- Children: 5

Adrian John Reynard (born 23 March 1951 in Welwyn, England) is a businessman and commercial astronaut. He is the founder of Reynard Motorsport, which was a successful racing car manufacturer before it went bankrupt in 2002.

== Career ==
As a student, Reynard was keenly interested in motorsport, particularly in the production of record-breaking motorcycles. He attended Oxford Polytechnic (now Oxford Brookes University) and then Cranfield University – in place of the strain gauge he had been expected to present as a final-year project he turned up for his viva voce examination in Mechanical Engineering with a brand new self-designed Formula Ford chassis (which he had to disguise as a Formula Three as he was sponsored by a rival car manufacturer) on a trailer. At Cranfield Reynard was a classmate of Pat Symonds. Teaming up with the experienced mechanic Bill Stone, Reynard set up Sabre Automotive which later became Reynard Motorsport. Reynard's cars were originally built so he could go racing himself; he was successful in Formula Ford and Formula Ford 2000 but the company he built rapidly became successful in many other formulae.

Adrian Reynard had several brushes with Formula One early in his career—he was commissioned to design a Hawke Formula One car for Rupert Keegan in the mid-1970s (this was not seen through—Reynard had never designed a monocoque before), and later became Chief Engineer for RAM-March in 1982 when the team was struggling with overweight copies of the Williams FW07. He claims to have engineered the cars to the state they should have been in at the start of the 1981 season, but little was achieved. While Reynard was undertaking these contracts, other hands continued to run his firm.

A Reynard F1 project went sour in 1991 and took the company to the brink of bankruptcy—Reynard had to sell many of his personal assets—but the firm fought back, continuing to dominate Formula 3000 until it became a single-chassis formula at the end of the 1995 season and entering Champ Car very successfully in 1994. Overly ambitious attempts to expand the company (and, possibly, Adrian Reynard's increasing involvement with British American Racing) led to financial difficulties.

Oxford Brookes university made up for Reynard's lack of a degree by awarding him an honorary doctorate. Adrian Reynard maintains his links with Cranfield University where he is Visiting Professor and serves on the advisory panel for both the Advanced Motorsport Engineering and Advanced Motorsport Mechatronics MSc. He makes an annual award for the best motorsport thesis project at Cranfield.

He received the Queen's Awards for Export Achievement in 1990 and 1996.

In 2004, Reynard has signed up to join the "Founders" of Virgin Galactic, an elite group of civilians who will be among the first people to ride into space for a price.

In 2009, Reynard has partnered with Andre Brown to relaunch Reynard Racing Cars with a new street legal trackday/race car.

In February 2009, he was linked with Richard Branson's Virgin Group, regarding a takeover of the Honda Racing F1 Team.

Reynard continues to work as a consultant on particular engineering topics within his vehicle engineering skill set. He is also the Chairman of the Auto Research Centre, which has its world headquarters in Indianapolis, Indiana, United States.

Reynard was hired by Ginetta Cars to develop the aerodynamics for their 2018 LMP1 racecar Ginetta G60-LT-P1.

On 8 September 2023, Reynard flew on Galactic flight 03 as Astronaut 016. This comes after originally joining the "Founders" of Virgin Galactic in 2004.

== Personal life ==
Reynard is married to Gill and has five children, two granddaughters and a grandson.

== Car collection ==
Model year	Car	#	Class	Note
1986	Reynard 863	034	Formula 3	The car in which Andy Wallace won the 1986 British Formula Three Championship.
1987	Reynard 873	054	Formula 3	The car in which Johnny Herbert won the 1987 British Formula Three Championship.
1988	Reynard 883	024	Formula 3	The car in which JJ Lehto won the 1988 British Formula Three Championship.
1988	Reynard 88D	007	International Formula 3000	The car in which Roberto Moreno won the 1988 International Formula 3000 Championship.
1989	Reynard 89D	017	International Formula 3000	The car in which Jean Alesi won the 1989 International Formula 3000 Championship.
1996	Reynard 96I	004	CART	Raced by Bryan Herta in the 1996 PPG Indy Car World Series.
2002	BAR 004	02	Formula One	Raced by Jacques Villeneuve in the 2002 Formula One season.
2003	BAR 005	01	Formula One	Raced by Jenson Button in the 2003 Formula One season.
