= BAR 004 =

Formula One racing car

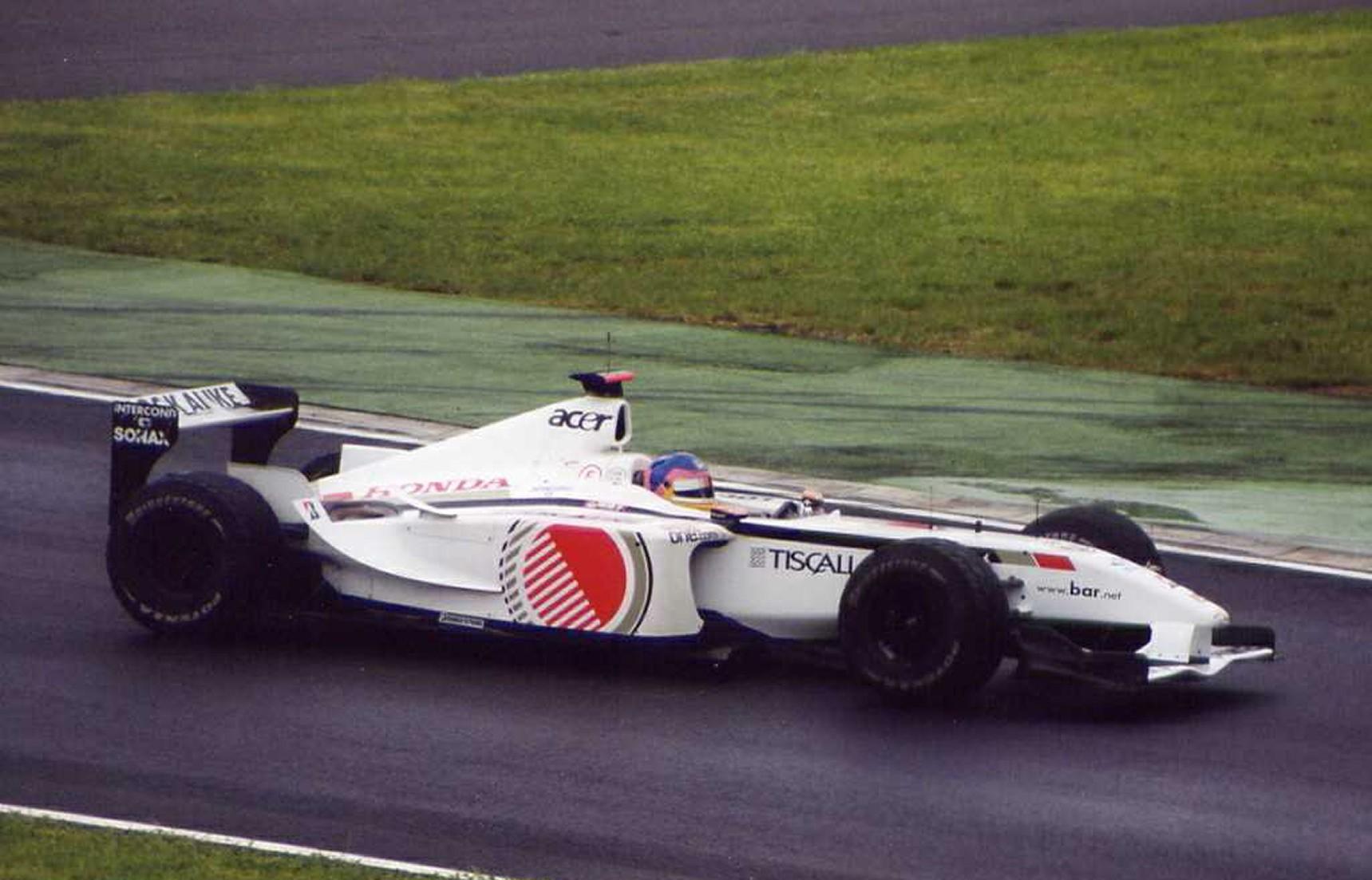
- Jacques Villeneuve driving the BAR 004 at the 2002 Italian Grand Prix
- Category: Formula One
- Constructor: BAR
- Designers: Malcolm Oastler (Technical Director); Gary Savage (Head of Design - Composites); Andrew Green (Head of Design - Mechanical); Jason Rees (Head of Electronics); Willem Toet (Senior Aerodynamicist); Simon Lacey (Senior Aerodynamicist)
- Predecessor: 003
- Successor: 005

Technical specifications
- Chassis: Carbon-fibre monocoque
- Suspension (front): independent, pushrod-activated, inboard spring
- Suspension (rear): independent, pushrod-activated, inboard spring
- Engine: Honda RA002E 2,994 cc (182.7 cu in) V10 (94°) naturally aspirated mid-engine
- Transmission: BAR/Xtrac 7-speed longitudinal semi-automatic sequential
- Power: 835 hp @ 18,200 rpm
- Fuel: Elf
- Tyres: Bridgestone

Competition history
- Notable entrants: Lucky Strike BAR Honda
- Notable drivers: 11. (Canada) Jacques Villeneuve; 12. (France) Olivier Panis
- Debut: 2002 Australian Grand Prix
- Last event: 2002 Japanese Grand Prix
Races	Wins	Poles	F/Laps
17	0	0	0
- Constructors' Championships: 0
- Drivers' Championships: 0

The BAR 004 was the car with which the British American Racing Formula One team competed in the 2002 Formula One season.

== Overview ==
The BAR 004 was launched on 18 December, 2001 at the teams headquarters in Brackley. The day after brand new team, Toyota. The launch event also confirmed new team boss David Richards taking over from Craig Pollock, and his Prodrive business taking on management of the team. The 004 was the first car designed solely in house by British American Racing technical director Malcolm Oastler following the end of a three year design agreement with Reynard. Before the season began, engine supplier Honda confirmed a new contract to continue supplying engines to British American Racing until 2004. This announcement at the cars launch also demonstrated the new Honda RA002E engine.

At the first test in Barcelona in January, both Villeneuve and Panis tested the car alongside reserve driver Anthony Davidson. All were outside the top 10 in their respective times. By the time testing reached Valencia later in the month, Panis and Villeneuve finished 8th and 9th fastest respectively.

However the season itself was a dismal one. By the British Grand Prix, they were rock bottom as the only team not to have scored any points. In that race, the team took full advantage of the mixed wet-dry conditions to score a double points finish, with Villeneuve in 4th and Panis in 5th. The team would score just a further two points that season with Panis in 6th in Monza and Villeneuve in 6th at Indianapolis. The team chalked up 17 retirements, including 5 races where both cars failed to finish. Olivier Panis did not complete a Grand Prix until the 8th round of the season in Canada. Whilst some retirements were due to accidents, such as for Panis in Australia and Monte-Carlo, primarily the retirements were due to unreliability. In season testing at Valencia was completed by Panis and Davidson in an attempt to resolve some of the issues.

The BAR 004 would see the team finish 8th in the constructors championship with 7 points.

== Drivers ==
Jacques Villeneuve and Olivier Panis were the race team drivers for the whole season. Villeneuve was completing his fourth season with the team, meanwhile Panis his second. The team had four reserve drivers who were Anthony Davidson, Darren Manning, Patrick Lemarie and Ryo Fukuda.

Davidson was allowed to be temporarily released of duties for the team so he could race for Minardi whilst Alex Yoong took a two race break.

== Sponsorship and livery ==
The livery was similar to the previous season with subtle changes. The team retained sponsors including Tiscali and Sonax.

BAR used the Lucky Strike logos, except at the British, French and United States Grand Prix where in Britain and France Lucky Strike was covered up and replaced with half a barcode and in the United States with the "British American Racing" logo and the cars were also adorned with the "USA 2002" logo.

== Complete Formula One results ==
(key) (results in bold indicate pole position, results in italics indicate fastest lap)

Year	Team	Engine	Tyres	Drivers	1	2	3	4	5	6	7	8	9	10	11	12	13	14	15	16	17	Points	WCC
2002	British American Racing	Honda RA002E V10	**B**		AUS	MAL	BRA	SMR	ESP	AUT	MON	CAN	EUR	GBR	FRA	GER	HUN	BEL	ITA	USA	JPN	**7**	**8th**
2002	British American Racing	Honda RA002E V10	**B**	(Canada) Jacques Villeneuve	Ret	8	10^{†}	7	7	10^{†}	Ret	Ret	12	4	Ret	Ret	Ret	8	9	6	Ret	**7**	**8th**
2002	British American Racing	Honda RA002E V10	**B**	(France) Olivier Panis	Ret	Ret	Ret	Ret	Ret	Ret	Ret	8	9	5	Ret	Ret	12	12	6	12	Ret	**7**	**8th**
