= BAR 005 =

Formula One racing car

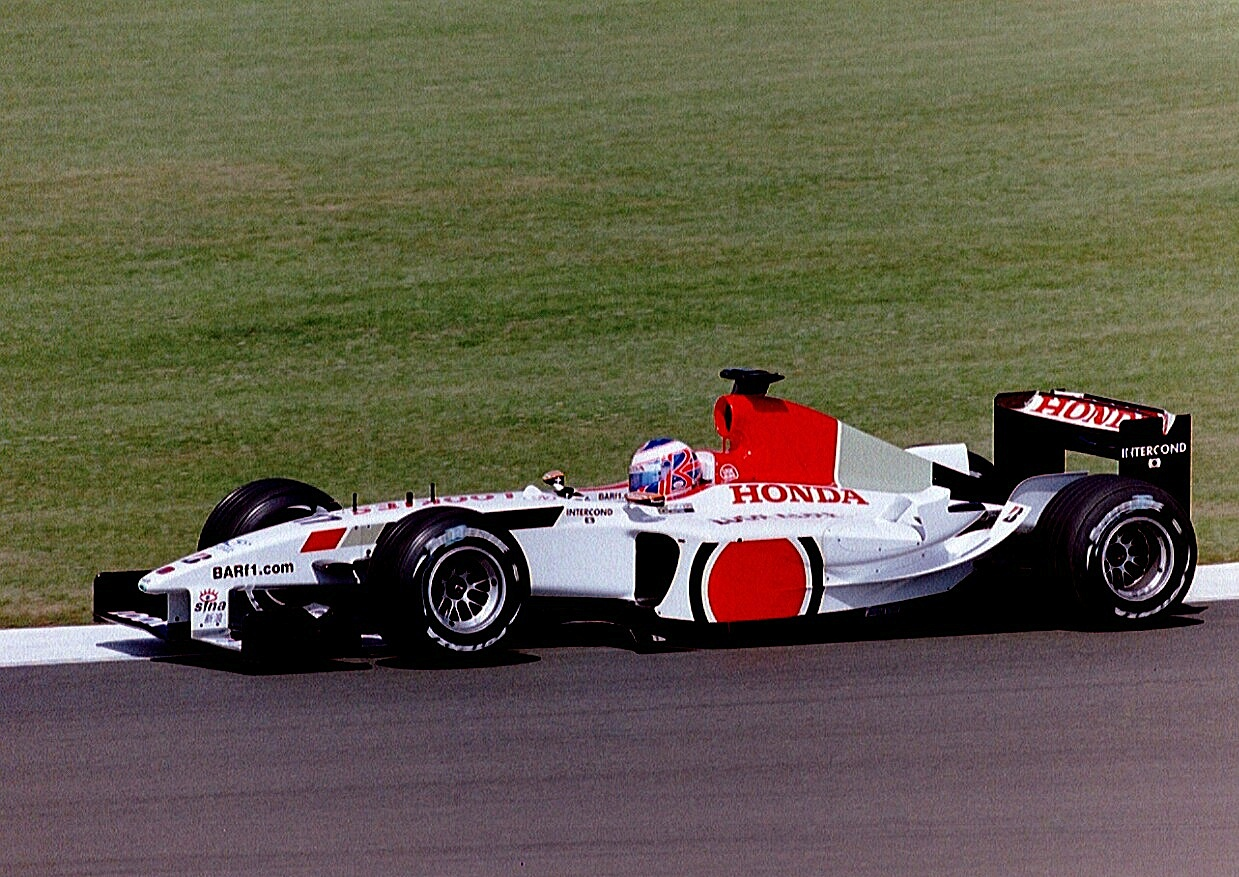
- Jenson Button driving the BAR 005 at the 2003 British Grand Prix
- Category: Formula One
- Constructor: BAR-Honda
- Designers: Geoff Willis (Technical Director); Jörg Zander (Chief Engineer); Willem Toet (Director of Aerodynamics and Design); Simon Lacey (Head of Aerodynamics); Kazutoshi Nishizawa (Engine Project Leader - Honda)
- Predecessor: 004
- Successor: 006

Technical specifications
- Chassis: Carbon fiber composite monocoque
- Suspension (front): Double wishbones, push rod operated torsion springs and dampers
- Suspension (rear): As front
- Engine: Honda RA003E 2,994 cc (182.7 cu in), V10 90°, naturally aspirated, mid-mounted
- Transmission: X-Trac, 7 forward gears + 1 reverse, sequential semi-automatic
- Power: 835 hp @ 18,200 rpm
- Fuel: Castrol
- Tyres: Bridgestone

Competition history
- Notable entrants: Lucky Strike BAR Honda
- Notable drivers: 16. (Canada) Jacques Villeneuve; 16. (Japan) Takuma Sato; 17. (United Kingdom) Jenson Button
- Debut: 2003 Australian Grand Prix
- Last event: 2003 Japanese Grand Prix
Races	Wins	Poles	F/Laps
16	0	0	0
- Constructors' Championships: 0
- Drivers' Championships: 0

The BAR 005 was the car with which the British American Racing Formula One team competed in the 2003 Formula One season. The car was driven by Jacques Villeneuve and Jenson Button, the former being replaced by test driver Takuma Sato for the last race of the season. The team's test driver was Anthony Davidson along with Sato. The BAR 005 was officially launched at Circuit de Catalunya, Spain on 14 January.

== Overview ==
The 005 was developed mainly by Geoff Willis, who had transferred from Williams, and became a machine that dispelled the Reynard lineage of the 004.

The design was conventional in the Williams style, and the performance was improved over the 004, but issues such as a smaller gearbox, engine reliability, aerodynamic efficiency, and matching with Bridgestone tyres were still being resolved.

Honda's V10 engine continued to be upgraded with lighter weight and higher rpm, but to compensate for the lack of downforce, the cars ran with wings, which offset the engine's much-vaunted power.

At the British Grand Prix, an aero package designed for the second half of the race was introduced. The engine intake has been changed from triangular to pentagonal. In addition, a unique design was adopted in which an additional fairing was added to the side of the side pontoon and connected to the mini wing on the top.

== Racing history ==
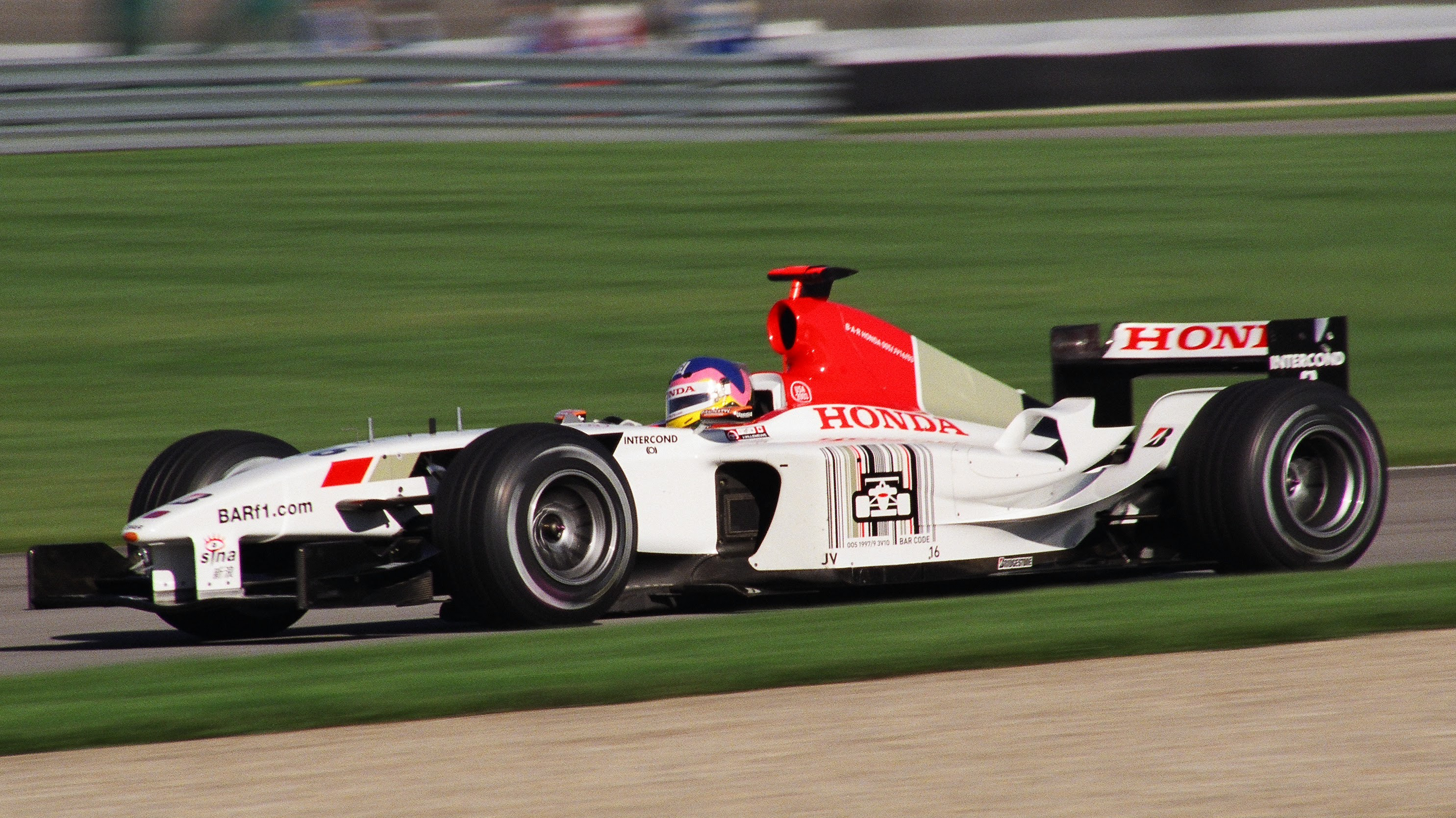
Jacques Villeneuve driving the 005 at the 2003 United States Grand Prix.

The 2003 season was a turning point in the relationship between Jacques Vileneuve, who had competed with the team since the beginning, and BAR, as the young talent Jenson Button showed better performance. While Villeneuve was either eliminated in the first few races of the season or did not score any points, Button was able to finish fourth in Austria. In Monaco, he suffered a serious accident during free practice on Saturday morning, so he was unable to start. He also led the United States Grand Prix for a while, until he was forced to stop.

Villeneuve's relationship with the team deteriorated so much that his contract was terminated before the season-ending Japanese Grand Prix. Takuma Sato took his place for the last race, who took sixth place, while Button finished fourth.

The team finished fifth in the Constructors' Championship with 26 points.

== Sponsorship and livery ==
For 2003, the livery was changed with the addition of black, red and gold stripes on the engine cover.

BAR used the 'Lucky Strike' logos, except at the French, British and United States Grands Prix, which were replaced with a barcode and random words "Look Alike" and "Don't Walk".

== BAR 04 Concept Car ==
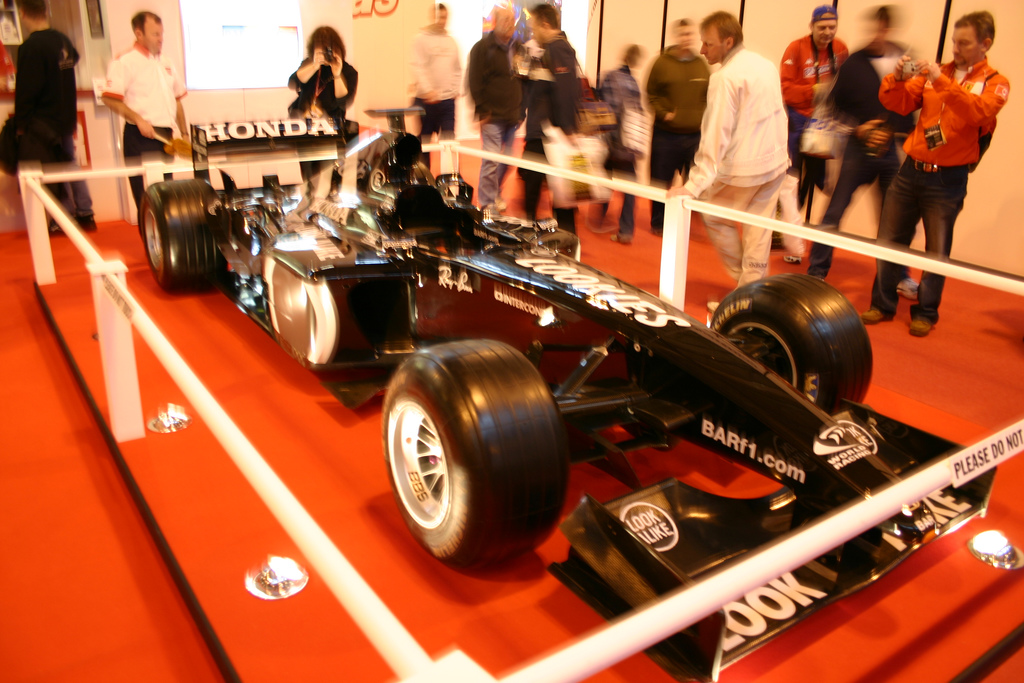
The BAR 04 Concept Car on display at the Autosport International car show in January 2004.

During the 2003-2004 offseason, BAR used the 04 Concept Car, a modified version of the 005, notably featuring a black and gray livery and the Honda RA004E engine from the following season.

== Complete Formula One results ==
(key) (results in bold indicate pole position, results in italics indicate fastest lap)

Year	Entrant	Engine	Tyres	Drivers	1	2	3	4	5	6	7	8	9	10	11	12	13	14	15	16	Points	WCC
2003	Lucky Strike BAR Honda	Honda RA003E V10	**B**		AUS	MAL	BRA	SMR	ESP	AUT	MON	CAN	EUR	FRA	GBR	GER	HUN	ITA	USA	JPN	**26**	**5th**
2003	Lucky Strike BAR Honda	Honda RA003E V10	**B**	(Canada) Jacques Villeneuve	9	DNS	6	Ret	Ret	12	Ret	Ret	Ret	9	10	9	Ret	6	Ret		**26**	**5th**
2003	Lucky Strike BAR Honda	Honda RA003E V10	**B**	(Japan) Takuma Sato																6	**26**	**5th**
2003	Lucky Strike BAR Honda	Honda RA003E V10	**B**	(United Kingdom) Jenson Button	10	7	Ret	8	9	4	DNS	Ret	7	Ret	8	8	10	Ret	Ret	4	**26**	**5th**
