= 2004 Malaysian Grand Prix =

Coordinates: 2°45′39″N 101°44′18″E

Race 2 of 18 in the 2004 Formula One World Championship
| ← Previous race | Next race → |

Race details
- Date: 21 March 2004
- Official name: 2004 Petronas Malaysian Grand Prix
- Location: Sepang International Circuit, Sepang, Malaysia
- Course: Permanent race circuit
- Course length: 5.543 km (3.444 miles)
- Distance: 56 laps, 310.408 km (192.879 miles)
- Weather: Dry, light rain at the start Air Temp 34 °C (93 °F)
- Attendance: 84,010 (Weekend)

Pole position
| Driver | (Germany) Michael Schumacher | Ferrari |
- Time: 1:33.074

Fastest lap
| Driver | (Colombia) Juan Pablo Montoya | Williams-BMW |
- Time: 1:34.223 on lap 28

Podium
| First | (Germany) Michael Schumacher | Ferrari |
| Second | (Colombia) Juan Pablo Montoya | Williams-BMW |
| Third | (United Kingdom) Jenson Button | BAR-Honda |

The 2004 Malaysian Grand Prix (officially the 2004 Petronas Malaysian Grand Prix) was a Formula One motor race held on 21 March 2004 at the Sepang International Circuit. It was Race 2 of 18 in the 2004 FIA Formula One World Championship. The race was won by Michael Schumacher for Ferrari. This was also the first podium for future World Champion Jenson Button, who finished in 3rd place.

== Friday drivers ==
The bottom 6 teams in the 2003 Constructors' Championship were entitled to run a third car in free practice on Friday. These drivers drove on Friday but did not compete in qualifying or the race.

| Constructor | No | Driver |
|---|---|---|
| BAR-Honda | 35 | (United Kingdom) Anthony Davidson |
| Sauber-Petronas | | - |
| Jaguar-Cosworth | 37 | (Sweden) Björn Wirdheim |
| Toyota | 38 | (Brazil) Ricardo Zonta |
| Jordan-Ford | 39 | (Germany) Timo Glock |
| Minardi-Cosworth | 40 | (Belgium) Bas Leinders |

== Race report ==
With all drivers starting on dry tyres, the action started sooner than expected as on the parade lap Kimi Räikkönen spun but was able to retake his grid position. Mark Webber, starting from P2, made a woeful start and slid down the field to be 9th by the 1st lap. Fernando Alonso on the other hand, made a brilliant start from 19th (2nd last) and was up behind Webber in 10th after lap 1. Michael Schumacher led from the start while drivers behind jostled for position. By the second lap, rain started to fall and cars were starting to lose traction on the dry tyres. Jarno Trulli overtook Button but the Brit promptly took the place back again. Alonso barreled past Webber for eighth and closed in on the McLaren of David Coulthard. From the back to a points position within four laps was an outstanding performance from Alonso but it was the best he got all race. By this time Michael Schumacher had already built up quite an advantage, but this was quickly eroded by the hard-charging Juan Pablo Montoya. It was to prove to be just a brief shower as soon the precipitation passed and Schumacher was back on his way.

Webber managed to get past Ralf but the Williams retaliated and got ahead again, puncturing the Jaguar's rear right tyre on his way. Takuma Sato spun into the gravel but recovered the BAR smartly and Webber had to pit for a tyre change. To add insult to injury he got a drive-through penalty for speeding in the pit lane and finally compounded his misery by spinning out of the race a few laps later.

A string of cars in the midfield were jostling for position, starting with Nick Heidfeld's Jordan in 11th, then Cristiano da Matta's Toyota, the second Jaguar of Christian Klien, Sauber's Giancarlo Fisichella and da Matta's teammate Olivier Panis. In the first round of pit stops Heidfeld's fuel rig failed and he had to go out and back in again. He eventually pulled into the pits to retire with a gearbox problem.

Trulli got ahead of Coulthard in the first stops and running order at the front, where not much was happening, was Michael, Montoya, Räikkönen. Montoya was falling away from the Ferrari in the second stint of the race but not letting him get too far ahead. Alonso took Coulthard for sixth but then the pair pitted for the second time and the McLaren got out ahead.

Alonso swapped to a two-stop strategy but it gave him no advantage and he seemed resigned to staying behind Coulthard, while Trulli, who had been on quite an early charge, also seemed to lose momentum. Ralf's engine unexpectedly gave up midway through the race, the first failure for BMW for 17 races. Felipe Massa, who was having a pretty good race, got held up by a Minardi and did a bit of agitated hand waving as he went by. The gap between Michael and Montoya was holding at around four seconds and Button moved up to third, jumping Räikkönen in the second pit stops. Both of the Finn's stops seemed quite long and eventually he pulled off to the side of the track with a transmission failure. Disappointing for Räikkönen and McLaren as Kimi was showing good pace until then.

Panis ducked into the pits only to find no crew ready for him and had to go straight back out. Then next lap he was back in again to serve a drive-through for speeding on his previous effort. Not a good day for Panis, or Toyota in general. Da Matta finished ninth after a fairly anonymous race.

In the final laps the BAR crew froze as one of the cars pulled off with an engine failure but it was Sato rather than third placed Button. Bad luck for Sato but the relief that it wasn't his teammate was palpable. Barrichello was gaining ground on Button but with only a few laps to go, he was not in a position to challenge.

Michael took the win with Montoya five seconds behind. BAR and Button were by far the happiest of the lot and the Englishman got the biggest cheer from the crowd as he lifted his first trophy on the third step of the podium.

== Classification ==
=== Qualifying ===
| Pos | No | Driver | Constructor | Q1 Time | Q2 Time | Gap | Grid |
|---|---|---|---|---|---|---|---|
| 1 | 1 | (Germany) Michael Schumacher | Ferrari | 1:33.865 | 1:33.074 | — | 1 |
| 2 | 14 | (Australia) Mark Webber | Jaguar-Cosworth | 1:34.016 | 1:33.715 | +0.641 | 2 |
| 3 | 2 | (Brazil) Rubens Barrichello | Ferrari | 1:34.132 | 1:33.756 | +0.682 | 3 |
| 4 | 3 | (Colombia) Juan Pablo Montoya | Williams-BMW | 1:34.941 | 1:34.054 | +0.980 | 4 |
| 5 | 6 | (Finland) Kimi Räikkönen | McLaren-Mercedes | 1:33.452 | 1:34.164 | +1.090 | 5 |
| 6 | 9 | (United Kingdom) Jenson Button | BAR-Honda | 1:34.528 | 1:34.221 | +1.147 | 6 |
| 7 | 4 | (Germany) Ralf Schumacher | Williams-BMW | 1:34.777 | 1:34.235 | +1.161 | 7 |
| 8 | 7 | (Italy) Jarno Trulli | Renault | 1:33.264 | 1:34.413 | +1.339 | 8 |
| 9 | 5 | (United Kingdom) David Coulthard | McLaren-Mercedes | 1:34.321 | 1:34.602 | +1.528 | 9 |
| 10 | 16 | (Brazil) Cristiano da Matta | Toyota | 1:35.684 | 1:34.917 | +1.843 | 10 |
| 11 | 12 | (Brazil) Felipe Massa | Sauber-Petronas | 1:35.132 | 1:35.039 | +1.965 | 11 |
| 12 | 11 | (Italy) Giancarlo Fisichella | Sauber-Petronas | 1:34.877 | 1:35.061 | +1.987 | 12 |
| 13 | 15 | (Austria) Christian Klien | Jaguar-Cosworth | 1:35.618 | 1:35.158 | +2.084 | 13 |
| 14 | 17 | (France) Olivier Panis | Toyota | 1:35.247 | 1:35.617 | +2.543 | 14 |
| 15 | 18 | (Germany) Nick Heidfeld | Jordan-Ford | 1:36.769 | 1:36.569 | +3.495 | 15 |
| 16 | 20 | (Italy) Gianmaria Bruni | Minardi-Cosworth | 1:38.729 | 1:38.577 | +5.503 | 16 |
| 17 | 21 | (Hungary) Zsolt Baumgartner | Minardi-Cosworth | 1:39.805 | 1:39.272 | +6.198 | 17 |
| 18 | 19 | (Italy) Giorgio Pantano^{5} | Jordan-Ford | No time^{1} | 1:39.902 | +6.828 | 18^{4} |
| 19 | 8 | (Spain) Fernando Alonso | Renault | 1:33.193 | No time^{2} | | 19^{4} |
| 20 | 10 | (Japan) Takuma Sato | BAR-Honda | 1:34.971 | No time^{3} | | 20^{4} |

Notes

- ^1 – Giorgio Pantano did not get time in Q1 due to gearbox problems.
- ^2 – Fernando Alonso did not get a time in Q2 after spinning off the track at turn 14.
- ^3 – Takuma Sato did not get a time in Q2 after spinning off the track at turn 11.
- ^4 – Giorgio Pantano, Fernando Alonso and Takuma Sato received a 10-place grid penalty for engine changes.
- ^5 – Giorgio Pantano became the first driver to experience the new penalty for using the spare car and as such a different engine during a Grand Prix weekend.

=== Race ===
| Pos | No | Driver | Constructor | Tyre | Laps | Time/Retired | Grid | Points |
|---|---|---|---|---|---|---|---|---|
| 1 | 1 | (Germany) Michael Schumacher | Ferrari | B | 56 | 1:31:07.490 | 1 | 10 |
| 2 | 3 | (Colombia) Juan Pablo Montoya | Williams-BMW | M | 56 | +5.022 | 4 | 8 |
| 3 | 9 | (United Kingdom) Jenson Button | BAR-Honda | M | 56 | +11.568 | 6 | 6 |
| 4 | 2 | (Brazil) Rubens Barrichello | Ferrari | B | 56 | +13.615 | 3 | 5 |
| 5 | 7 | (Italy) Jarno Trulli | Renault | M | 56 | +37.360 | 8 | 4 |
| 6 | 5 | (United Kingdom) David Coulthard | McLaren-Mercedes | M | 56 | +53.098 | 9 | 3 |
| 7 | 8 | (Spain) Fernando Alonso | Renault | M | 56 | +1:07.877 | 19 | 2 |
| 8 | 12 | (Brazil) Felipe Massa | Sauber-Petronas | B | 55 | +1 Lap | 11 | 1 |
| 9 | 16 | (Brazil) Cristiano da Matta | Toyota | M | 55 | +1 Lap | 10 | |
| 10 | 15 | (Austria) Christian Klien | Jaguar-Cosworth | M | 55 | +1 Lap | 13 | |
| 11 | 11 | (Italy) Giancarlo Fisichella | Sauber-Petronas | B | 55 | +1 Lap | 12 | |
| 12 | 17 | (France) Olivier Panis | Toyota | M | 55 | +1 Lap | 14 | |
| 13 | 19 | (Italy) Giorgio Pantano | Jordan-Ford | B | 54 | +2 Laps | PL^{6} | |
| 14 | 20 | (Italy) Gianmaria Bruni | Minardi-Cosworth | B | 53 | +3 Laps | 16 | |
| 15 | 10 | (Japan) Takuma Sato | BAR-Honda | M | 52 | Engine | 20 | |
| 16 | 21 | (Hungary) Zsolt Baumgartner | Minardi-Cosworth | B | 52 | +4 Laps | 17 | |
| Ret | 6 | (Finland) Kimi Räikkönen | McLaren-Mercedes | M | 40 | Hydraulics/Engine | 5 | |
| Ret | 18 | (Germany) Nick Heidfeld | Jordan-Ford | B | 34 | Transmission | 15 | |
| Ret | 4 | (Germany) Ralf Schumacher | Williams-BMW | M | 27 | Engine | 7 | |
| Ret | 14 | (Australia) Mark Webber | Jaguar-Cosworth | M | 23 | Spun off | 2 | |

Notes

- ^6 – Giorgio Pantano started the race from the pitlane.

== Championship standings after the race ==
Drivers' Championship standings

| +/– | Pos | Driver | Points |
|---|---|---|---|
| | 1 | (Germany) Michael Schumacher | 20 |
| | 2 | (Brazil) Rubens Barrichello | 13 |
| 2 | 3 | (Colombia) Juan Pablo Montoya | 12 |
| 2 | 4 | (United Kingdom) Jenson Button | 9 |
| 2 | 5 | (Spain) Fernando Alonso | 8 |

Constructors' Championship standings

| +/– | Pos | Constructor | Points |
|---|---|---|---|
| | 1 | (Italy) Ferrari | 33 |
| | 2 | (United Kingdom) Williams-BMW | 17 |
| | 3 | (France) Renault | 14 |
| | 4 | (United Kingdom) BAR-Honda | 9 |
| | 5 | (United Kingdom) McLaren-Mercedes | 4 |

- Note: Only the top five positions are included for both sets of standings.

| Previous race: 2004 Australian Grand Prix | FIA Formula One World Championship; 2004 season | Next race: 2004 Bahrain Grand Prix |
| Previous race: 2003 Malaysian Grand Prix | Malaysian Grand Prix | Next race: 2005 Malaysian Grand Prix |
