= Kevin Taylor (engineer) =

British engineer

- Occupation: Engineer
- Years active: 1988 - 2021
- Known for: Formula One engineer

Kevin Taylor is a retired British Formula One engineer. He is best known for holding senior engineering roles at British American Racing, Honda Racing F1 Team and Mercedes-AMG F1 Team.

== Career ==
Taylor trained in mechanical engineering at City College Norwich, completing ONC and HNC qualifications in Mechanical and Production Engineering between 1985 and 1989. He began his Formula One career with Team Lotus in 1988 as a junior design engineer, before moving to Benetton Formula in 1990 and Scuderia Ferrari in 1992, where he contributed to chassis and monocoque design programmes during a five-year tenure at their technical centre in Guildford.

In 1997 he joined Arrows Grand Prix as a senior design engineer, playing a central role in monocoque and gearbox structural design. Taylor later became Head of Composite Design at British American Racing (BAR) in 2002, overseeing composite structures and manufacturing development during the team’s expansion phase. He was promoted to chief designer at in 2005, leading the chassis design group responsible for the team’s Formula One car projects as the team transitioned into Honda Racing F1 Team.

Seeking a new challenge, Taylor joined Toyota Racing in 2009 as Head of Mechanical Design, managing suspension, braking, and steering system development while coordinating advanced concept studies. In 2010 he moved to Mercedes-AMG F1 Team, where he served as Head of Composite Design and later Head of Engineering Efficiency, helping to develop organisational and production processes during the team’s formative years in the modern hybrid era. He retired from the sport in 2021.
