= 2004 Bahrain Grand Prix =

Coordinates: 26°01′57″N 50°30′38″E

Race 3 of 18 in the 2004 Formula One World Championship
← Previous race	Next race →

Race details
- Date: 4 April 2004
- Official name: 2004 Gulf Air Bahrain Grand Prix
- Location: Bahrain International Circuit, Sakhir, Bahrain
- Course: Permanent racing facility
- Course length: 5.417 km (3.366 miles)
- Distance: 57 laps, 308.523 km (191.860 miles)
- Weather: Warm, dry and overcast
- Attendance: 68,000 (Weekend)

Pole position
Driver	(Germany) Michael Schumacher	Ferrari
- Time: 1:30.139

Fastest lap
Driver	(Germany) Michael Schumacher	Ferrari
- Time: 1:30.252 on lap 7 (lap record)

Podium
First	(Germany) Michael Schumacher	Ferrari
Second	(Brazil) Rubens Barrichello	Ferrari
Third	(United Kingdom) Jenson Button	BAR-Honda

The 2004 Bahrain Grand Prix (officially known as the 2004 Gulf Air Bahrain Grand Prix) was a Formula One motor race that took place on 4 April 2004 at the Bahrain International Circuit in Sakhir, Bahrain. It was the third round of the 2004 FIA Formula One World Championship.

It was the first Formula One race to be held in the Kingdom of Bahrain and the Middle East. The 57-lap race was won by Ferrari driver Michael Schumacher ahead of his teammate Rubens Barrichello and with Jenson Button completing the podium for the BAR team.

== Background ==
=== Championship standings before the race ===
With two wins in two races, both starting from pole position, Michael Schumacher was the early favourite for the championship. The German had gathered 20 points, ahead of Ferrari teammate Rubens Barrichello (13) and Williams driver Juan Pablo Montoya (12). In the Constructors' Championship, Ferrari was leading with 33 points, almost double that of Williams (17), with Renault in third position (14).

=== Weather ===
The sessions on Friday and Saturday were run under clear skies and high temperatures. Early on Sunday morning, a desert storm hit the circuit, which first brought rain and then sand. With the circuit now even more slippery than the new asphalt already had been the days before, and with the rain having brought the air temperature down, the Bridgestone runners, among which most notably Ferrari, were expected to have the upper hand.

== Practice ==
Four free practice sessions were held for the event. On Friday, the first session was topped by the Ferraris of Michael Schumacher and Rubens Barrichello. The second session saw Barrichello on top, one thousands of a second ahead of Juan Pablo Montoya, with Schumacher in fourth.

On Saturday, Jenson Button topped the third session in his BAR-Honda, ahead of Montoya and Schumacher. The Brit repeated this feat in the fourth session, with both Williamses, Ralf Schumacher ahead of Montoya, completing the top three.

=== Friday drivers ===
The bottom 6 teams in the 2003 Constructors' Championship were entitled to run a third car in free practice on Friday. These drivers drove on Friday but did not compete in qualifying or the race.

Constructor	Nat	Driver
BAR-Honda	35	(United Kingdom) Anthony Davidson
Sauber-Petronas		-
Jaguar-Cosworth	37	(Sweden) Björn Wirdheim
Toyota	38	(Brazil) Ricardo Zonta
Jordan-Ford	39	(Germany) Timo Glock
Minardi-Cosworth	40	(Belgium) Bas Leinders

== Qualifying ==
Qualifying on Saturday consisted of two sessions. In the first session, drivers went out one by one in the order in which they classified at the previous race. Each driver was allowed to set one lap time. The result determined the running order in the second session: the fastest driver in the first session was allowed to go last in the second session, which usually provided the benefit of a cleaner track. In the second session, drivers were again allowed to set one lap time, which determined the order on the grid for the race on Sunday, with the fastest driver scoring pole position.

Pos	No	Driver	Constructor	Q1 Time	Q2 Time	Gap	Grid
1	1	(Germany) Michael Schumacher	Ferrari	1:30.751	1:30.139	—	1
2	2	(Brazil) Rubens Barrichello	Ferrari	1:31.283	1:30.530	+0.391	2
3	3	(Colombia) Juan Pablo Montoya	Williams-BMW	1:30.247	1:30.581	+0.442	3
4	4	(Germany) Ralf Schumacher	Williams-BMW	1:29.968	1:30.633	+0.494	4
5	10	(Japan) Takuma Sato	BAR-Honda	1:31.135	1:30.827	+0.688	5
6	9	(United Kingdom) Jenson Button	BAR-Honda	1:31.131	1:30.856	+0.717	6
7	7	(Italy) Jarno Trulli	Renault	1:31.103	1:30.971	+0.832	7
8	17	(France) Olivier Panis	Toyota	1:31.001	1:31.686	+1.547	8
9	16	(Brazil) Cristiano da Matta	Toyota	1:31.329	1:31.717	+1.578	9
10	5	(United Kingdom) David Coulthard	McLaren-Mercedes	1:31.364	1:31.719	+1.580	10
11	11	(Italy) Giancarlo Fisichella	Sauber-Petronas	1:31.203	1:31.731	+1.592	11
12	15	(Austria) Christian Klien	Jaguar-Cosworth	1:31.868	1:32.332	+2.193	12
13	12	(Brazil) Felipe Massa	Sauber-Petronas	1:32.152	1:32.536	+2.397	13
14	14	(Australia) Mark Webber	Jaguar-Cosworth	1:31.945	1:32.625	+2.486	14
15	18	(Germany) Nick Heidfeld	Jordan-Ford	1:32.640	1:33.506	+3.367	18^{1}
16	19	(Italy) Giorgio Pantano	Jordan-Ford	1:33.598	1:34.105	+3.966	15
17	8	(Spain) Fernando Alonso	Renault	1:31.040	1:34.130	+3.991	16
18	20	(Italy) Gianmaria Bruni	Minardi-Cosworth	1:34.879	1:34.584	+4.445	17
19	21	(Hungary) Zsolt Baumgartner	Minardi-Cosworth	1:35.632	1:35.787	+5.648	20^{1}
20	6	(Finland) Kimi Räikkönen	McLaren-Mercedes	1:30.353	No time^{1}		19^{2}

Notes

- ^1 – After multiple engine issues during practice, McLaren decided to save the Mercedes engine and abort Räikkönen's effort in the second qualifying session.
- ^2 – Nick Heidfeld, Zsolt Baumgartner and Kimi Räikkönen received a 10-place grid penalty for engine changes.

== Race ==
=== Race report ===
At the start, Rubens Barrichello was slightly faster off the line than Michael Schumacher, but the German turned aggressively into the first corner to retain his position. Juan Pablo Montoya stayed in third place, while Takuma Sato passed Ralf Schumacher for fourth. A couple of laps later, Ralf Schumacher dived down the inside at the first corner, but Sato stayed side-by-side. When Schumacher turned in for the next corner, his rear wheel touched his rival's front wheel and he was sent into a spin. Ralf was issued a warning for leaving too little racing room for his competitor. On lap eight, Kimi Räikkönen suffered his third retirement in three races when his Mercedes engine exploded.

At the end of that lap, leader Michael Schumacher opened the first round of pit stops. He rejoined in sixth but regained the lead when others pitted. Teammate Rubens Barrichello stalled his engine when leaving his pit box. He rejoined over 14 seconds behind Schumacher but still retained second place over Juan Pablo Montoya. Renault's Jarno Trulli had climbed up to fourth, while his teammate Fernando Alonso, who had started down in sixteenth, incurred damage on lap 1 and had to make an unscheduled pit stop, was now pressuring Mark Webber for eighth place. When the Australian overshot the first corner, Alonso went through on the inside, the Spaniard on his way to a sixth place in the end. Ralf Schumacher had another coming-together, this time with Giancarlo Fisichella, sending the Italian spinning.

The order at the front remained unchanged through the second and third round of pit stops, but on lap 47, Montoya slowed down due to a problem with his gearbox. Jenson Button in the BAR had overtaken Trulli and could now pass Montoya to score his second consecutive podium. Montoya's Williams slowed further and the Colombian dropped down to thirteenth place at the finish. Schumacher and Barrichello merely had to complete the race to score another dominant 1-2 finish.

=== Race classification ===
Pos	No	Driver	Constructor	Tyre	Laps	Time/Retired	Grid	Points
1	1	(Germany) Michael Schumacher	Ferrari	B	57	1:28:34.875	1	10
2	2	(Brazil) Rubens Barrichello	Ferrari	B	57	+1.367	2	8
3	9	(United Kingdom) Jenson Button	BAR-Honda	M	57	+26.687	6	6
4	7	(Italy) Jarno Trulli	Renault	M	57	+32.214	7	5
5	10	(Japan) Takuma Sato	BAR-Honda	M	57	+52.460	5	4
6	8	(Spain) Fernando Alonso	Renault	M	57	+53.156	16	3
7	4	(Germany) Ralf Schumacher	Williams-BMW	M	57	+58.155	4	2
8	14	(Australia) Mark Webber	Jaguar-Cosworth	M	56	+1 Lap	14	1
9	17	(France) Olivier Panis	Toyota	M	56	+1 Lap	8	
10	16	(Brazil) Cristiano da Matta	Toyota	M	56	+1 Lap	9	
11	11	(Italy) Giancarlo Fisichella	Sauber-Petronas	B	56	+1 Lap	11	
12	12	(Brazil) Felipe Massa	Sauber-Petronas	B	56	+1 Lap	13	
13	3	(Colombia) Juan Pablo Montoya	Williams-BMW	M	56	Gearbox	3	
14	15	(Austria) Christian Klien	Jaguar-Cosworth	M	56	+1 Lap	12	
15	18	(Germany) Nick Heidfeld	Jordan-Ford	B	56	+1 Lap	18	
16	19	(Italy) Giorgio Pantano	Jordan-Ford	B	55	+2 Laps	15	
17	20	(Italy) Gianmaria Bruni	Minardi-Cosworth	B	52	+5 Laps	PL^{1}	
Ret	5	(United Kingdom) David Coulthard	McLaren-Mercedes	M	50	Pneumatics	10	
Ret	21	(Hungary) Zsolt Baumgartner	Minardi-Cosworth	B	44	Engine	20	
Ret	6	(Finland) Kimi Räikkönen	McLaren-Mercedes	M	7	Engine	19	

Notes

- ^1 – Gianmaria Bruni started the race from the pitlane.

== Championship standings after the race ==
Drivers' Championship standings

+/–	Pos	Driver	Points
	1	(Germany) Michael Schumacher	30
	2	(Brazil) Rubens Barrichello	21
1	3	(United Kingdom) Jenson Button	15
1	4	(Colombia) Juan Pablo Montoya	12
	5	(Spain) Fernando Alonso	11

Constructors' Championship standings

+/–	Pos	Constructor	Points
	1	(Italy) Ferrari	51
1	2	(France) Renault	22
1	3	(United Kingdom) Williams-BMW	19
	4	(United Kingdom) BAR-Honda	19
	5	(United Kingdom) McLaren-Mercedes	4

- Note: Only the top five positions are included for both sets of standings.

Previous race: 2004 Malaysian Grand Prix	FIA Formula One World Championship; 2004 season	Next race: 2004 San Marino Grand Prix
Previous race: N/A	Bahrain Grand Prix	Next race: 2005 Bahrain Grand Prix
Awards
Preceded by 2003 Spanish Grand Prix	Formula One Promotional Trophy for Race Promoter; 2004	Succeeded by 2005 Monaco Grand Prix
