= British American Racing =

British Formula One motor racing team

BAR
- Full name: British American Racing (1999); Lucky Strike BAR Honda (2000–2005)
- Base: Brackley, Northamptonshire, United Kingdom
- Founder(s): Craig Pollock
- Noted staff: Adrian Reynard; David Richards; Nick Fry; Geoff Willis; Ron Meadows; Jörg Zander; Willem Toet; Andrew Shovlin; Jock Clear
- Noted drivers: List: (Canada) Jacques Villeneuve; (United Kingdom) Jenson Button; (Brazil) Ricardo Zonta; (Finland) Mika Salo; (France) Olivier Panis; (Japan) Takuma Sato; (United Kingdom) Anthony Davidson
- Previous name: Tyrrell Racing
- Next name: Honda Racing F1 Team

Formula One World Championship career
- First entry: 1999 Australian Grand Prix
- Races entered: 118 (117 starts)
- Engines: Supertec, Honda
- Constructors' Championships: 0 (best finish: 2nd, 2004)
- Drivers' Championships: 0 (best finish: 3rd, 2004, Jenson Button)
- Race victories: 0 (best finish: 2nd, 2004 San Marino, Monaco, German and Chinese Grands Prix)
- Podiums: 15
- Points: 227
- Pole positions: 2
- Fastest laps: 0
- Final entry: 2005 Chinese Grand Prix

British American Racing (BAR) was a Formula One constructor that competed in the sport from 1999 to 2005. BAR began by acquiring Tyrrell, and used Supertec engines for their first year. Subsequently, they formed a partnership with Honda which lasted for the next six years.

The team was named after British American Tobacco plc (BAT), which owned and sponsored it in order to display its Lucky Strike and 555 brands. The headquarters were in Brackley, Northamptonshire, United Kingdom.

In mid-November 2004, Japanese automobile manufacturer Honda purchased 45% of the team, and in September 2005, purchased the remaining 55% share to become the sole owner. Consequently, BAR Honda became Honda Racing F1 Team for the 2006 Formula One season. BAT continued as title sponsor with the Lucky Strike brand, but due to new tobacco advertising regulations worldwide, pulled its sponsorship from Formula One entirely at the end of the 2006 season.

Honda ran the team for the 2006, 2007 and 2008 seasons. During 2008, the Honda RA109 was being developed for the following year while Honda attempted to sell the team. A management buy-out by team principal Ross Brawn and an engine supply deal with Mercedes-Benz resulted in a remarkable 2009 season in which Brawn GP team won the Constructors' Championship with Jenson Button winning the Drivers' Championship. Mercedes bought the team in November 2009 and as of 2026, the team competes as Mercedes-AMG Petronas Formula One Team.

== History ==
British American Tobacco (BAT) had been involved in Formula One for many years, with several of its brands being displayed on F1 cars run by various teams.

In 1997, the corporation was convinced by Craig Pollock to provide most of the equity to purchase the Tyrrell Formula One team for £30 million. Pollock, Adrian Reynard and Rick Gorne were the minority partners. The deal was announced on 2 December 1997. The team was still officially known as Tyrrell in 1998, before it became BAR the following year.

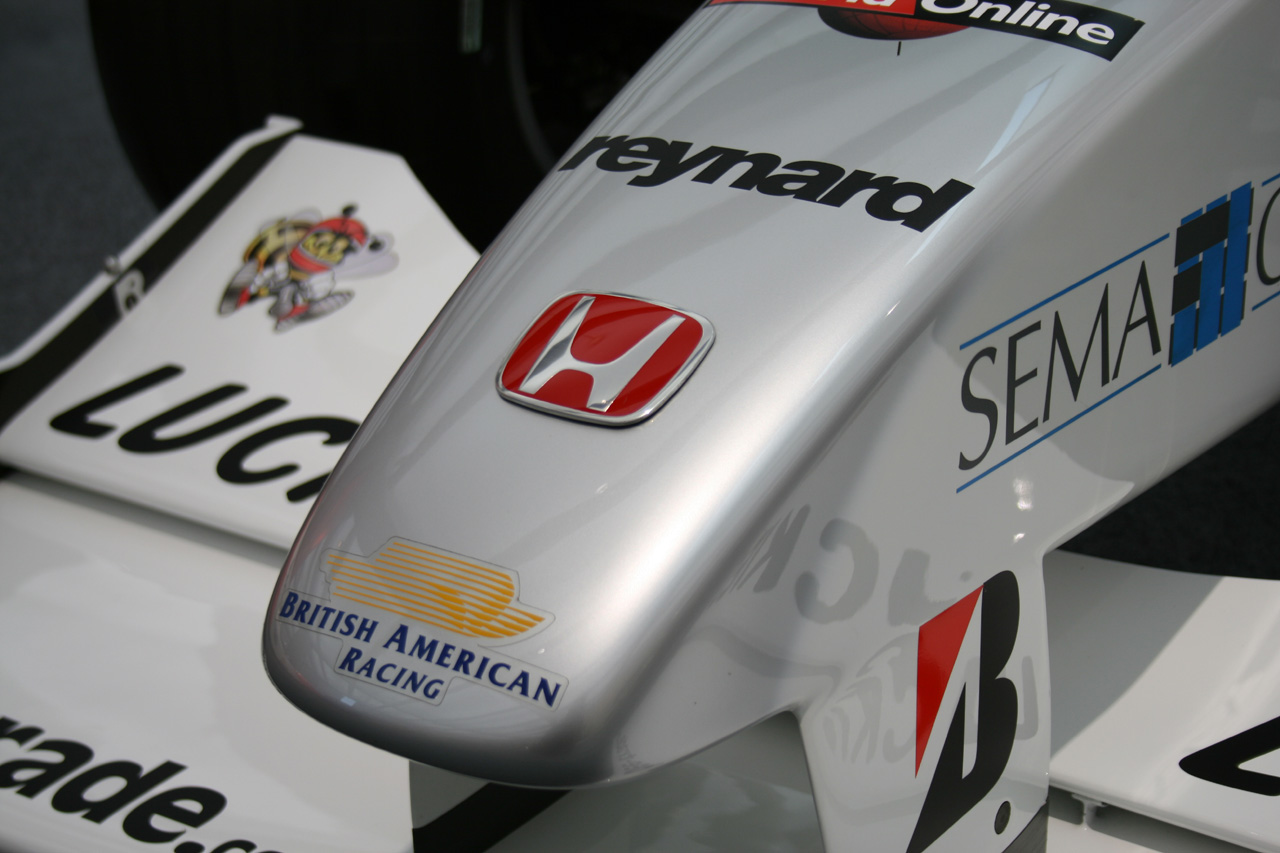
The team had Reynard chassis and Honda engines (although in the maiden season they used Supertecs instead)

=== Preparations ===
On 23 July 1998, BAR announced the signing of 1997 World Champion Jacques Villeneuve away from Williams with a lucrative contract for the 1999 season. Pollock had managed Villeneuve throughout his racing career. Villeneuve was joined by F1 rookie Ricardo Zonta. The car's chassis was built by Reynard Motorsport at a new factory in Brackley and was powered by Supertec (rebadged Renault) engines.

At the launch of their new car, BAR unveiled separate liveries for their cars; Villeneuve's car painted in a white and red Lucky Strike livery and Zonta's carrying a blue and yellow 555 livery. The FIA deemed the dual liveries illegal under F1 regulations which state that a team's cars must carry largely identical liveries. BAR lodged a complaint with the International Chamber of Commerce (as permitted under F1's regulations) but simultaneously lodged a complaint with the European Commission. Pollock was summoned to the World Motor Sport Council to explain the team's behaviour. A potential fine and/or ban was averted when Pollock agreed to abide by the F1 arbitration process, admitted that in filing the complaint to the EC his lawyers had acted independently and that declarations made in the claim did not reflect his personal views. He also apologised to the Council and reiterated his acceptance of the FIA's authority. To get around the ban, BAR ran one side of their cars painted in the Lucky Strike colours, and the other side in the blue and yellow of 555. BAR reverted to a more traditional style of livery for 2000 onwards.

BAR had the slogan of "A tradition of excellence", which was viewed as humorous by pundits as the team had no history and therefore no such tradition at all. Adrian Reynard also made an ambitious claim that the team would win a race in their debut season.

=== Customer Supertec era (1999) ===
==== 1999 ====
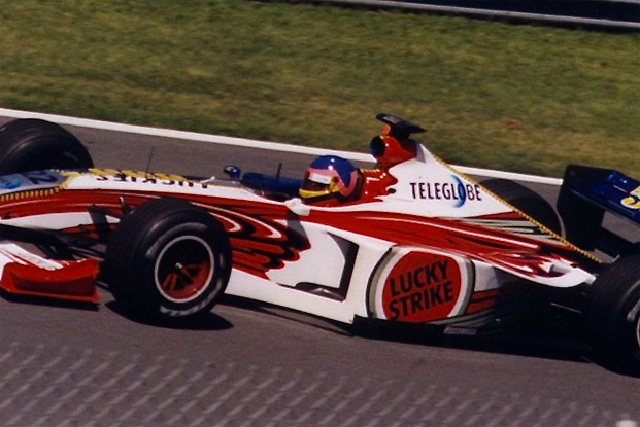
Jacques Villeneuve driving the BAR 01 at the 1999 Canadian Grand Prix

In a disastrous maiden season, BAR failed to score a single point in the Constructors' Championship, being the only one of the eleven teams that season not to do so. The car was relatively quick and often qualified in the midfield, as seen especially in the Spanish Grand Prix, where Villeneuve had briefly been in third place ahead of the Ferraris before pitting in.

However, the car suffered from chronic reliability issues, resulting in many instances of the car failing to finish the race. This was especially the case of Villeneuve, who started the season with 11 straight retirements before his first race finish of the season at Belgium, only to twice more fail to finish the race in the European and Malaysian Grands Prix later on. The Belgian event was notable also for both Villeneuve and Zonta having similar serious crashes during qualifying sessions, reportedly as a result of the drivers betting they could take the famous Eau Rouge corner flat.

Zonta sustained an injury during practice for the Brazilian Grand Prix and was unable to participate in qualifying for the race. He was also forced to miss out on the next three races due to that injury. Mika Salo, who filled in for Zonta in those three races, provided the team with its season best finish of 7th at San Marino (although Salo himself did not reach the chequered flag at the end of the race).

=== Works Honda era (2000-2005) ===
==== 2000 ====
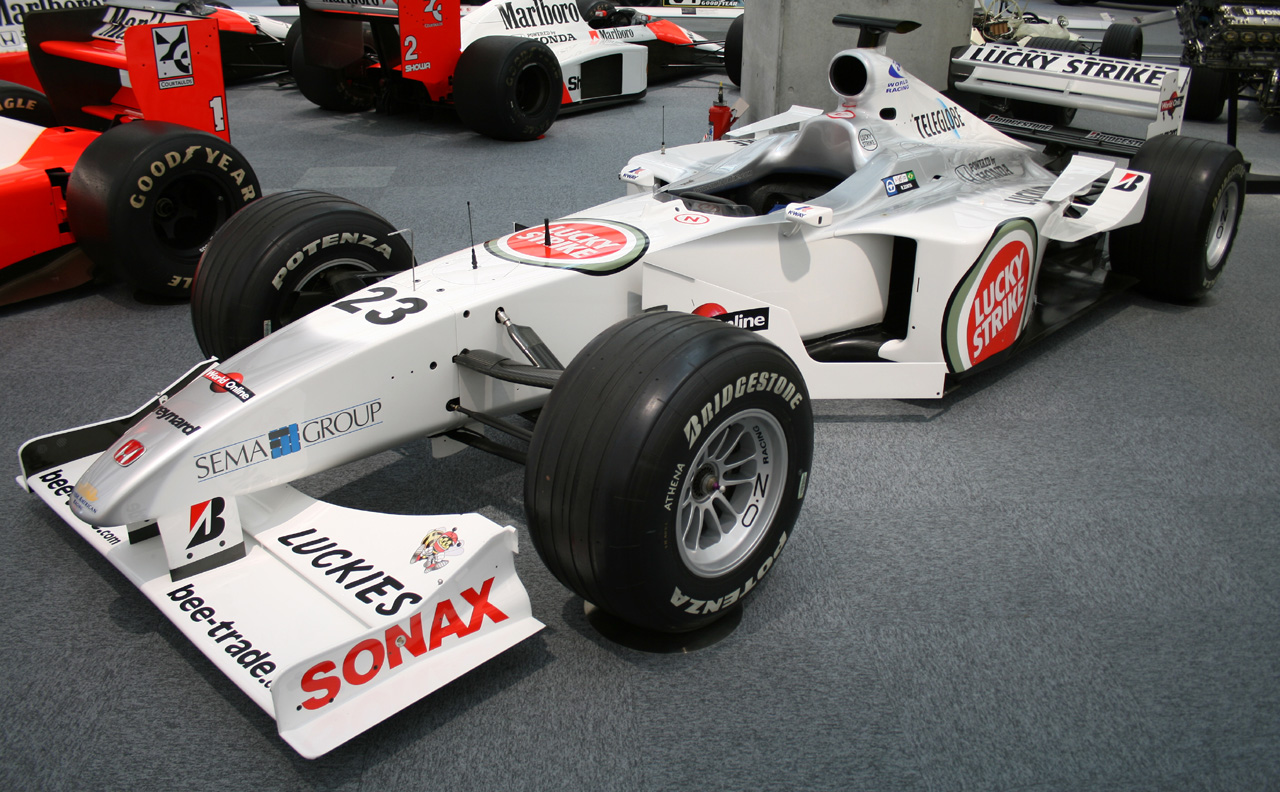
The BAR 002 brought the team its first points at the 2000 Australian Grand Prix

During the 1999 season, BAR announced that Honda had become their engine supplier beginning in 2000. The Honda deal not only meant they would supply engines, but that Honda staff would work with the team at their Brackley base as well as received full-factory support from Honda including official team vehicles and free engines. Honda had planned to enter Formula One as a factory team, but relented due to Harvey Postlethwaite's untimely death at the beginning of the previous year. It was the first time Honda had been directly involved in Formula One since 1992. BAR did not have exclusive use of Honda engines though, as Jordan Grand Prix also used Mugen Honda power units. The following year, Jordan were given factory Honda engines, but the engine manufacturers could not supply two teams forever. This prompted a battle between BAR and Jordan for the use of Honda engines in the long term.

The car was once again designed in co-operation with Adrian Reynard despite talk of tension between him and team principal Craig Pollock. At the launch of the 002 car, Pollock himself described the 2000 season as a chance to "wipe the slate clean" following their awful first season and admitted that the team had made many mistakes in their first season.

In 2000, the new Honda powered BAR did show a significant improvement. It proved to be considerably more reliable than the team's previous effort, but the team still only had a best finish of 4th and the victory they had promised in 1999 still eluded them. At the end of the season, the team finished 5th in the Constructors' Championship. The progression and improvement of the team was enough to convince Villeneuve to remain at the team.

==== 2001 ====
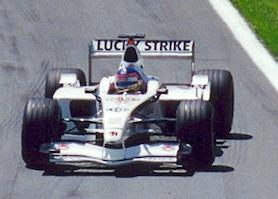
Villeneuve driving the BAR 003 at the 2001 Canadian Grand Prix

Villeneuve reached the podium twice in 2001 for BAR, but neither he nor his new teammate Olivier Panis's results were consistent enough. Panis was only able to score points at Brazil and Austria while Villeneuve combined with his 2 podiums was able to score points in Monaco and Italy, BAR ultimately finished 2001 in 6th place which was 1 place below their 5th place finish in 2000.

==== 2002 ====
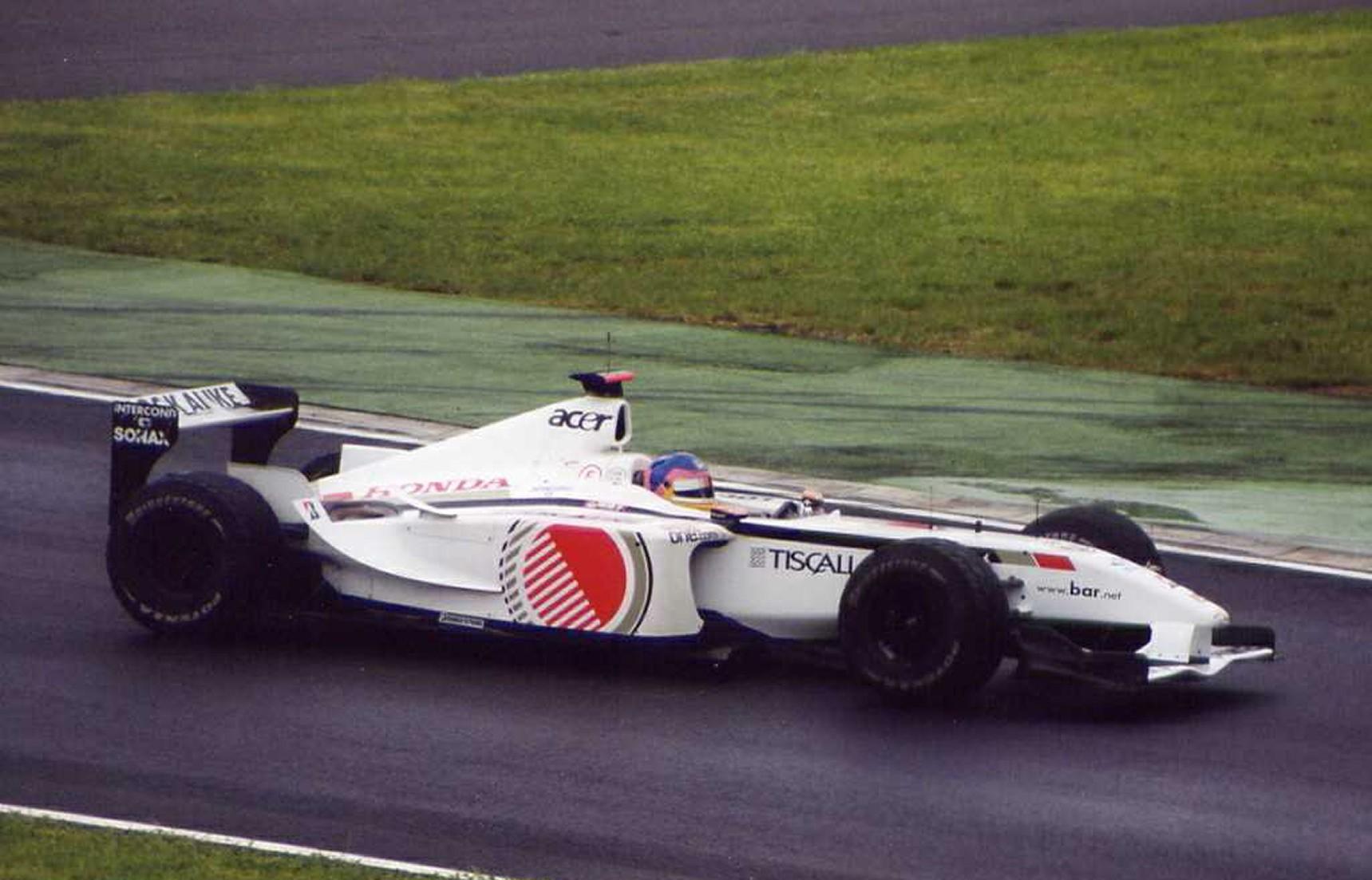
Jacques Villeneuve driving the BAR 004 at the 2002 Italian Grand Prix

Under pressure from British American Tobacco, Pollock resigned on the eve of the launch of the 2002 car and was replaced as team principal by David Richards. Richards' Prodrive company was also awarded a five-year management contract to run BAR. BAT and Prodrive had a prior relationship with BAT sponsoring Subaru's World Rally Championship team, operated by Prodrive.

2002 was a transient season for BAR. A significant proportion of the workforce was culled while technical director Malcolm Oastler and designer Andy Green left. Villeneuve still struggled to score points and Panis also failed to reach expectations which resulted in his departure at the end of the season. 2002 saw BAR score points at only 3 races, Britain where Villeneuve and Panis finished 4th and 5th respectively, Italy where Panis finished 6th and USA where Villeneuve finished 6th, BAR ended 2002 with only 7 points and down in 8th place in the Constructors' Standings which was 2 positions down from their 6th place in 2001.

BAR would later sign a deal to become Honda's only team in 2003, despite finishing behind Honda's other team, Jordan, in both 2001 and 2002.

==== 2003 ====
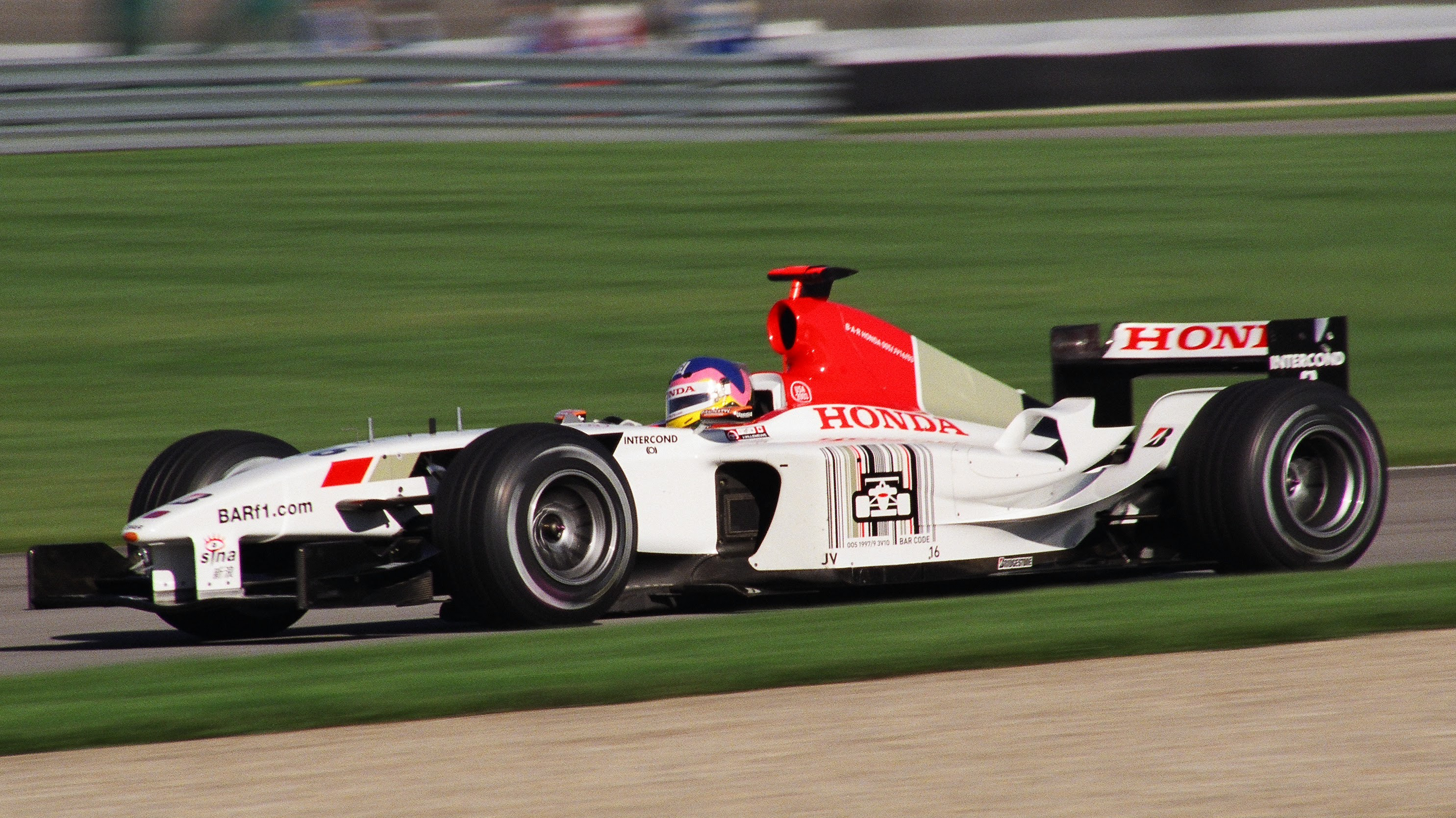
Villeneuve driving the BAR 005 at the 2003 United States Grand Prix

Logo used by BAR during their partnership with Honda, which began exclusively from the 2001 season

BAR brought in Jenson Button to replace Toyota-bound Olivier Panis for the 2003 Formula One season. Villeneuve's contract negotiation arguments with David Richards eventually ended with him being replaced before the end of the season by Japanese Honda-backed driver Takuma Sato. Honda has traditionally liked its teams to field Japanese drivers for publicity reasons in its home country. Jenson Button led a race for the first time at the 2003 United States Grand Prix. The team struggled due to its use of Bridgestone tyres. In the off-season they changed to rival company Michelin.

==== Peak in 2004 ====
Early in 2004, the team saw a further upswing in its fortunes, Button scoring many podium finishes. He also took their first pole position at San Marino. BAR finished the season in 2nd place in the Constructors' Championship, beating every team except for Ferrari. Despite this, BAR's first win still eluded them.

During the course of the 2004 season, a dispute with WilliamsF1 threatened to overshadow BAR's on-track performance. Both teams believed they had a valid contract for Button in 2005. The issue finally went to the Contract Recognition Board, which found in favour of BAR. Button was to drive for BAR in 2005, but signed a contract to join Williams for 2006.

With increasing restrictions being placed upon tobacco companies' opportunities to advertise in Formula One, rumours suggested that BAT would try to sell the team. In mid-November 2004, BAR announced that Honda had purchased 45% and, as part of the deal, David Richards left to be replaced by Nick Fry as team principal. Prodrive's management contract was also terminated early.

==== 2005: Poor start and controversy ====
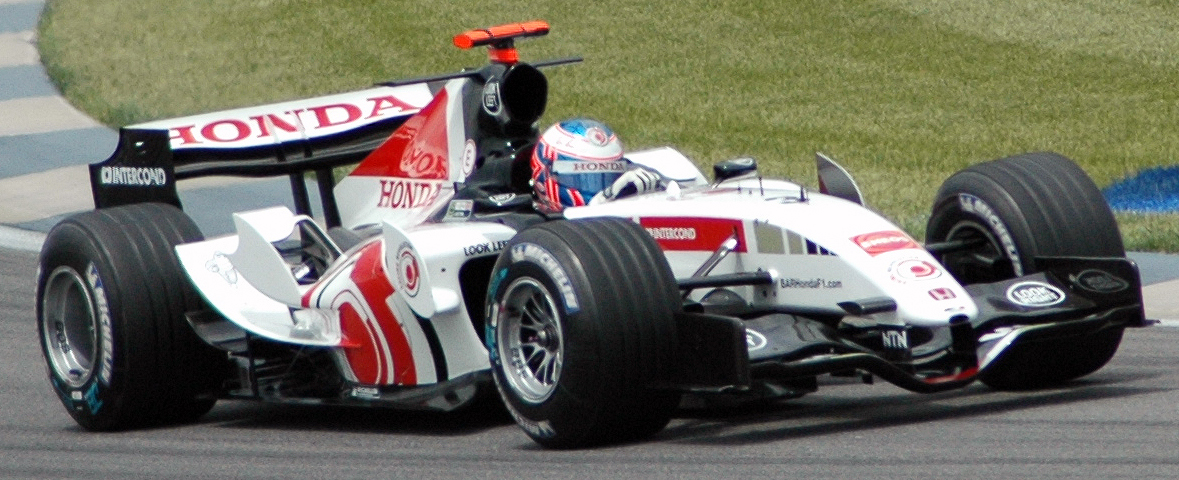
Jenson Button driving the BAR 007 at the 2005 United States Grand Prix

The start of the 2005 season didn't go according to plan for BAR, as they struggled in the "flyaway" races at the start of the season. Just as they became competitive in San Marino, BAR Honda was disqualified for running with illegal cars. The allegation was that the cars were able to race with their total weight below 605 kg (1323 lb), the minimum weight required for a Formula 1 car. BAR disputed this, saying that the engine required a minimum of 6 kg (13 lb) of fuel to work, thus keeping them above the minimum weight. Their interpretation of the rules was that this limit applies only during the race, not during the post-race scrutineering. The FIA, and later the court, disagreed. In addition to the disqualification, the team was banned for two races, a period which included the lucrative Monaco Grand Prix. The team initially indicated that they planned to fight the decision before a regular civil court but later decided to accept the verdict. Max Mosley, the president of the FIA, saw the sanction as very lenient; he had wanted the team to be banned for the rest of the season. However, they were unable to prove deliberate intent to cheat as they had with BAR's predecessor, Tyrrell, in the 1984 season.

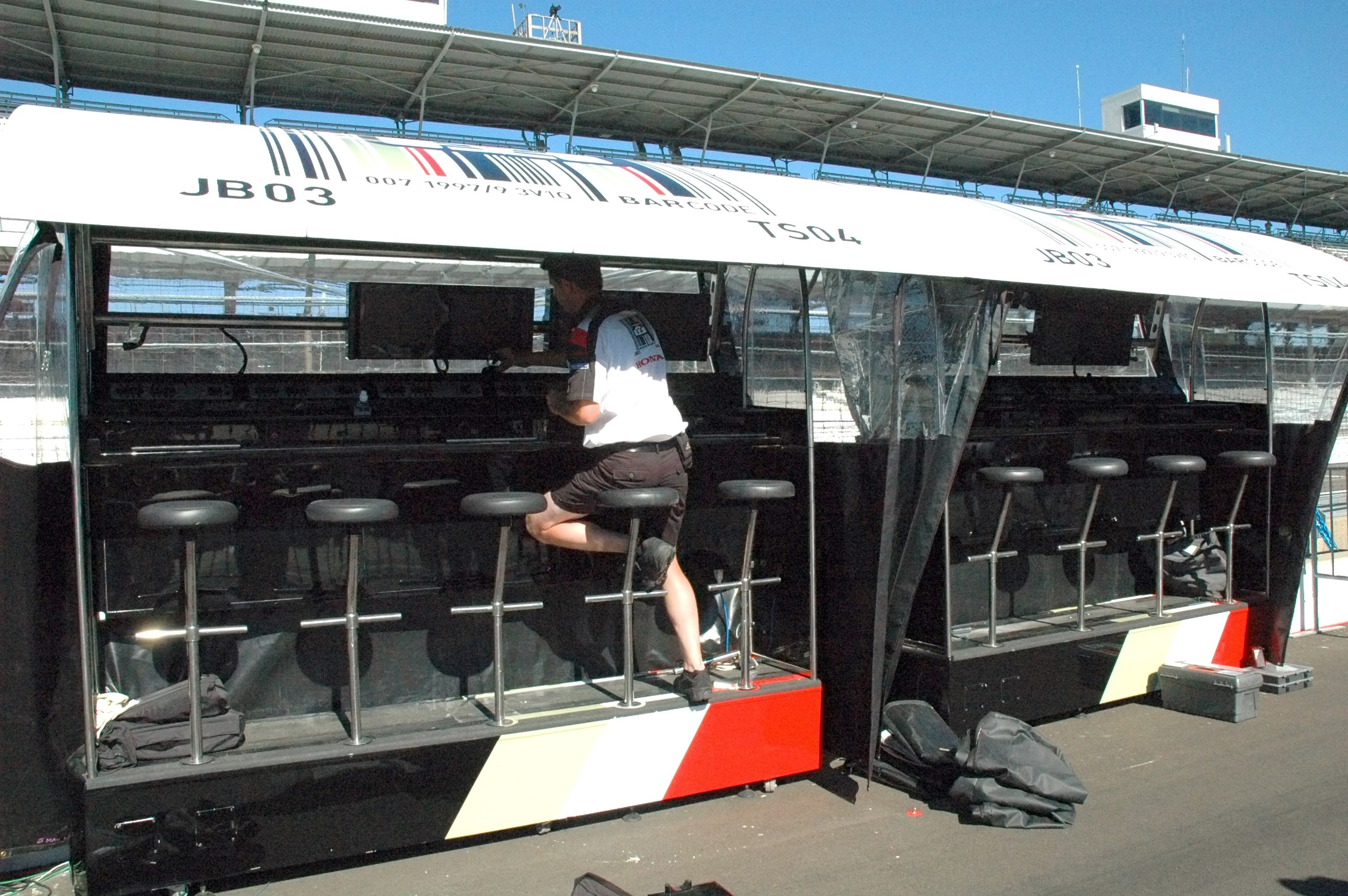
The team's pitwall control centre, from which the team managers and strategists communicated with the drivers and engineers

When BAR returned at the European Grand Prix, the team struggled to find its feet. In stark contrast to the previous season, BAR failed to score a single point until the midway point, at the 2005 French Grand Prix, not helped by the team's use of Michelin tyres causing them to not start the 2005 United States Grand Prix. Takuma Sato had a particularly poor season, scoring just one point, and subsequently, his contract was not renewed by BAR at the end of the season. Sato was replaced in the new Honda team by former Ferrari driver Rubens Barrichello. Button scored in each of the last 10 races of the season, culminating in 2 podium positions. Confirmation of this improvement was shown in a skillful pass made by Jenson Button, overtaking Jacques Villeneuve at the fast Pouhon corner at Spa-Francorchamps, in the rain, and around the outside.

At the end of 2005, Honda obtained 100% ownership of BAR from British American Tobacco, completing their ambition to become a full manufacturer team, racing as Honda Racing F1 Team in 2006, that being the last year of the Lucky Strike sponsorship. In addition, Jenson Button's Williams contract was bought out for US$30 million, and Button signed a multi-year contract with Honda.

Following the sale of the team to Honda, BAT would return to Formula One in 2019 sponsoring McLaren in a "global partnership" agreement under its A Better Tomorrow campaign, relating to electronic cigarettes and related alternative smoking products.

== Complete Formula One results ==
(key)

Year	Chassis	Engine	Tyres	Drivers	1	2	3	4	5	6	7	8	9	10	11	12	13	14	15	16	17	18	19	Points	WCC
1999	01	Supertec FB01 3.0 V10	B		AUS	BRA	SMR	MON	ESP	CAN	FRA	GBR	AUT	GER	HUN	BEL	ITA	EUR	MAL	JPN				0	NC
1999	01	Supertec FB01 3.0 V10	B	(Canada) Jacques Villeneuve	Ret	Ret	Ret	Ret	Ret	Ret	Ret	Ret	Ret	Ret	Ret	15	8	10^{†}	Ret	9				0	NC
1999	01	Supertec FB01 3.0 V10	B	(Brazil) Ricardo Zonta	Ret	DNQ				Ret	9	Ret	15^{†}	Ret	13	Ret	Ret	8	Ret	12				0	NC
1999	01	Supertec FB01 3.0 V10	B	(Finland) Mika Salo			7^{†}	Ret	8															0	NC
2000	002	Honda RA000E 3.0 V10	B		AUS	BRA	SMR	GBR	ESP	EUR	MON	CAN	FRA	AUT	GER	HUN	BEL	ITA	USA	JPN	MAL			20	5th
2000	002	Honda RA000E 3.0 V10	B	(Canada) Jacques Villeneuve	4	Ret	5	16^{†}	Ret	Ret	7	15^{†}	4	4	8	12	7	Ret	4	6	5			20	5th
2000	002	Honda RA000E 3.0 V10	B	(Brazil) Ricardo Zonta	6	9	12	Ret	8	Ret	Ret	8	Ret	Ret	Ret	14	12	6	6	9	Ret			20	5th
2001	003	Honda RA001E 3.0 V10	B		AUS	MAL	BRA	SMR	ESP	AUT	MON	CAN	EUR	FRA	GBR	GER	HUN	BEL	ITA	USA	JPN			17	6th
2001	003	Honda RA001E 3.0 V10	B	(France) Olivier Panis	7	Ret	4	8	7	5	Ret	Ret	Ret	9	Ret	7	Ret	11	9	11	13			17	6th
2001	003	Honda RA001E 3.0 V10	B	(Canada) Jacques Villeneuve	Ret	Ret	7	Ret	3	8	4	Ret	9	Ret	8	3	9	8	6	Ret	10			17	6th
2002	004	Honda RA002E 3.0 V10	B		AUS	MAL	BRA	SMR	ESP	AUT	MON	CAN	EUR	GBR	FRA	GER	HUN	BEL	ITA	USA	JPN			7	8th
2002	004	Honda RA002E 3.0 V10	B	(Canada) Jacques Villeneuve	Ret	8	10^{†}	7	7	10^{†}	Ret	Ret	12	4	Ret	Ret	Ret	8	9	6	Ret			7	8th
2002	004	Honda RA002E 3.0 V10	B	(France) Olivier Panis	Ret	Ret	Ret	Ret	Ret	Ret	Ret	8	9	5	Ret	Ret	12	12^{†}	6	12	Ret			7	8th
2003	005	Honda RA003E 3.0 V10	B		AUS	MAL	BRA	SMR	ESP	AUT	MON	CAN	EUR	FRA	GBR	GER	HUN	ITA	USA	JPN				26	5th
2003	005	Honda RA003E 3.0 V10	B	(Canada) Jacques Villeneuve	9	DNS	6	Ret	Ret	12	Ret	Ret	Ret	9	10	9	Ret	6	Ret					26	5th
2003	005	Honda RA003E 3.0 V10	B	(Japan) Takuma Sato																6				26	5th
2003	005	Honda RA003E 3.0 V10	B	(United Kingdom) Jenson Button	10	7	Ret	8	9	4	DNS	Ret	7	Ret	8	8	10	Ret	Ret	4				26	5th
2004	006	Honda RA004E 3.0 V10	M		AUS	MAL	BHR	SMR	ESP	MON	EUR	CAN	USA	FRA	GBR	GER	HUN	BEL	ITA	CHN	JPN	BRA		119	2nd
2004	006	Honda RA004E 3.0 V10	M	(United Kingdom) Jenson Button	6	3	3	2^{P}	8	2	3	3	Ret	5	4	2	5	Ret	3	2	3	Ret		119	2nd
2004	006	Honda RA004E 3.0 V10	M	(Japan) Takuma Sato	9	15^{†}	5	16^{†}	5	Ret	Ret	Ret	3	Ret	11	8	6	Ret	4	6	4	6		119	2nd
2005	007	Honda RA005E 3.0 V10	M		AUS	MAL	BHR	SMR	ESP	MON	EUR	CAN	USA	FRA	GBR	GER	HUN	TUR	ITA	BEL	BRA	JPN	CHN	38	6th
2005	007	Honda RA005E 3.0 V10	M	(United Kingdom) Jenson Button	11^{†}	Ret	Ret	DSQ			10	Ret^{P}	DNS	4	5	3	5	5	8	3	7	5	8	38	6th
2005	007	Honda RA005E 3.0 V10	M	(Japan) Takuma Sato	14^{†}	PO	Ret	DSQ			12	Ret	DNS	11	16	12	8	9	16	Ret	10	DSQ	Ret	38	6th
2005	007	Honda RA005E 3.0 V10	M	(United Kingdom) Anthony Davidson		Ret																		38	6th

Notes

- ^{†} – The driver did not finish the Grand Prix, but was classified, as he completed over 90% of the race distance.

== Speed record attempt ==
BAR tested a modified BAR-Honda 007 car, which they intended to use in an attempt to set the land speed record for a car meeting FIA Formula One regulations. The team aimed for 400 km/h (249 mph), and had planned to attempt the record at Bonneville Salt Flats. The driver for this project was Alan van der Merwe. The modified chassis performed a shakedown test on the 10,000-foot (3.0 km) long runway at Mojave Airport in California, on 5 November 2005, under the supervision of safety co-ordinator executive, Jamie Hardwick. The four published times recorded in this test were 393 km/h (244 mph), 405 km/h (252 mph), 410 km/h (255 mph) and 413 km/h (257 mph). However, these tests did not constitute the record attempt itself and waterlogging of the salt flats resulted in the attempt being postponed. The chassis was used by BAR's successor, Honda, to set a new record the following year.
