= Gary Savage (engineer) =

British engineer

- Born: Gary Mark Savage; 27 April 1960 (age 66); Barrow-in-Furness, United Kingdom
- Occupation: Engineer
- Years active: 1990 - 2009
- Known for: Formula One Engineer

Gary Mark Savage (born 27 April 1960) is a retired British Formula One engineer. He is best known for serving as deputy technical director and later operations director at the Formula One team based in Brackley, during its successive incarnations as British American Racing, Honda Racing F1 Team and Brawn GP.

== Career ==
Savage studied engineering at Oxford Brookes University, where he later earned a doctorate, developing a specialism in advanced materials and composite structures. He began his Formula One career in 1990 with McLaren as a research and development engineer, working on materials technology and structural development programmes during a period of rapid technical change in the sport.

In 1996, Savage joined Arrows as Head of Research and Development, overseeing materials research, structural analysis and the application of new composite manufacturing techniques. He subsequently held a similar position at Prost Grand Prix, continuing to focus on the integration of advanced materials into chassis design and performance development.

Savage moved to British American Racing (BAR) in 2000, where he took responsibility for composite engineering and production technologies, and was later promoted to deputy technical director. He retained this senior role as the team became Honda Racing F1 Team, contributing to both car development and wider technical programmes, including Honda’s Bonneville 400 land-speed record project.

He later served as operations director for the Brackley-based team through its Honda ownership and into the championship-winning Brawn GP era, overseeing operational delivery, manufacturing integration and technical coordination. Savage left the organisation at the end of 2009, concluding nearly two decades in Formula One engineering leadership.
