= Jörg Zander =

German Formula One car designer (born 1964)

- Born: Jörg Zander; 15 February 1964 (age 62); Ratingen, Germany
- Occupation: F1 Car Chief designer

Jörg Zander (born 15 February 1964 in Ratingen) is a German Formula One car designer.

== Career ==
Zander graduated from Cologne University in 1990 before joining Toyota. After a brief period working in Touring Cars he returned to Toyota to work on the Formula One project and in 2003 moved to the BAR Formula One team.

In September 2005, Zander was recruited by the Williams team to replace outgoing Chief Designer Gavin Fisher who was sacked earlier in the year as a result of the team's poor performances. Zander worked alongside Chief Aerodynamicist Loïc Bigois, under the supervision of Technical Director Sam Michael.

In March 2006, Zander resigned from the Williams team for personal reasons, and immediately joined the BMW Sauber team as Chief Designer, accountable to Technical Director Willy Rampf.

In July 2007, it was announced he had agreed to join the Honda Racing F1. Zander was immediately suspended and then joined Honda. Zander continued in his role with the Brawn GP team, following the management buy-out in March 2009 of the Honda F1 operation, but left the team on 19 June 2009. After leaving Brawn, Zander established an automotive engineering company called JZ Engineering. In October 2011, Zander was in discussions with the HRT F1 team to become its technical director, but the deal fell through.

Zander joined Audi Sport in 2015 as the Head of Technology, and was involved with the sports car team in the World Endurance Championship. After Audi withdrew from the World Endurance Championship at the end of the 2016 season, it was announced that Zander would return to Sauber as Technical Director for the 2017 Formula One season.

On 2 May 2018, 18 months after his start as Technical Director at Sauber, the Swiss team announced Zander had left the team.
