= State Express 555 =

British cigarette brand

- Product type: Cigarette
- Current owner: British American Tobacco
- Country: United Kingdom
- Introduced: Westminster, London (10 March 1896; 130 years ago)
- Markets: See Markets
- Previous owners: Ardath Tobacco Company
- Tagline: Smoothness Above All Else

State Express 555, known as 555 (Three-Fives), is a Westminster, London-based cigarette originally manufactured in the United Kingdom by the Ardath Tobacco Company. The overseas rights to the brand excluding the United Kingdom, were acquired by British American Tobacco (BAT) in 1925.

== History ==
The idea for the State Express brand came from the United States in 1893. Sir Albert Levy (1864–1937), a London tobacco merchant and businessman, was visiting the United States. While in Manhattan, Levy was a passenger on the Empire State Express train, which allegedly broke land speed records as locomotive No.999, the "Queen of Speed" sped its way from New York City to Buffalo, New York.

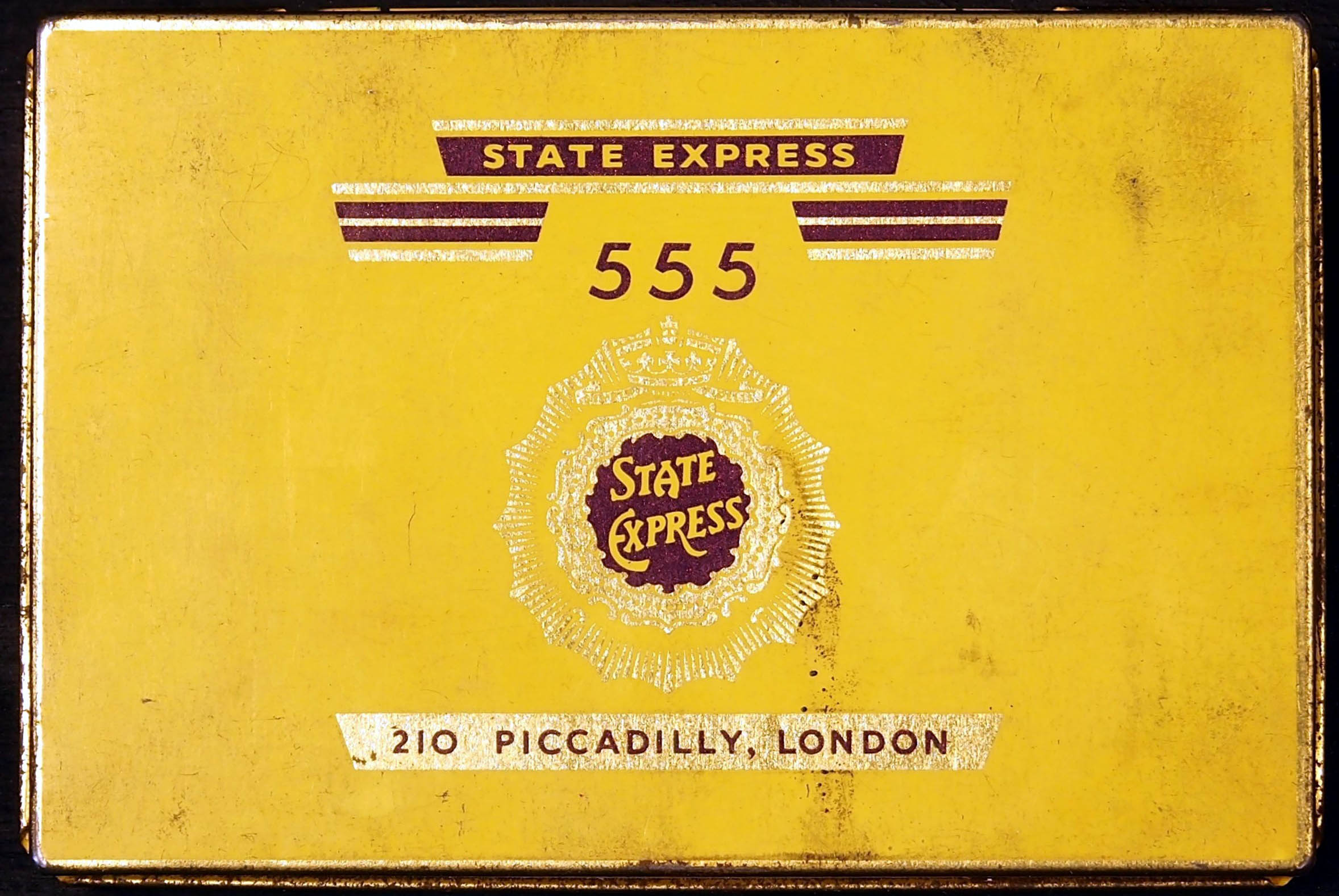
Old tin of State Express 555

State Express was founded in London on 10 March 1896. The numerals (a series of triple numbers from 111 to 999) forming the other part of the trademark were registered under UK Registration No. 290529 on 18 February 1907. All of these numbers were used as different brands, each with a different blend or mix of tobacco: 444 was made with Macedonian leaf, and 777 was made with Turkish tobacco, for example. The numeric ranges for State Express cigarettes were not the only available variants in the market at that time. Other mark names included My Darling and Astorias, available in export catalogues. In addition to the cigarette business, cigars and tobaccos were available in the State Express range. But by far the most successful of these was the Virginia tobacco blend of State Express 555, introduced in 1896. It went on to become Ardath's flagship brand.

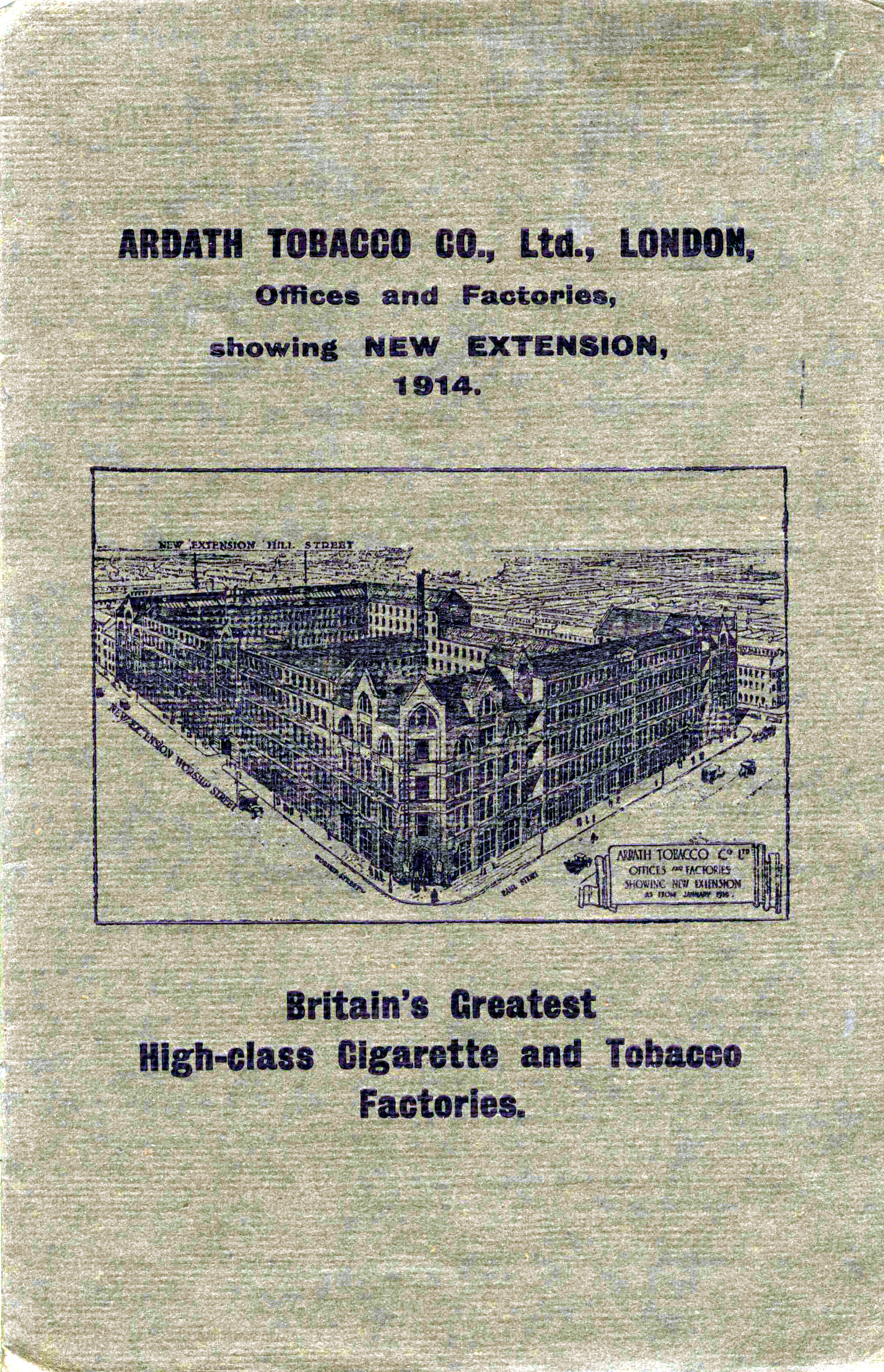
A poster shows Ardarth Tobacco offices and factories in 1914

The brand was originally owned by Ardath Tobacco Company. The company was created in the late 19th century in London, England, and was originally called Albert Levy & Thomas.

The Ardath Tobacco Company Limited was originally located at 62 Leadenhall Street in London and called La Casa de Habana (The House of Havana) until 1895, when it changed its name to the present day version. It is said that Sir Albert Levy derived the name Ardath from a book of the same name written by Marie Corelli. The title of the book is derived from numerous references in the Books of Esdras (in the Apocrypha) to the "Field of Ardath". On 31 July 1895 Levy registered the trademark Ardath in Ireland.

The name of the company was changed in 1901 to the "Ardath Tobacco Company", and was split in 1925 when it was sold; British American Tobacco acquired the overseas rights of Ardath, while the Imperial Tobacco Group retained the rights of sale within the United Kingdom and Ireland. The State Express brand proved to be a boon for B.A.T., where it was a huge success in China until the rise of communism there (though it has since been re-introduced). Ardath's brands continued to be sold in Britain; they were granted a Royal Warrant by King George VI in 1946 and again later by Queen Elizabeth II. In 1961, British American Tobacco bought out Imperial Tobacco's share of Ardath, thus gaining full control of Ardath's trademarks.

In the 1920s and 1930s BAT held a dominant position in the Chinese market with State Express 555 playing a key role. Sales of the brand exceeded 5 billion units in 1937. According to Mao Zedong's personal physician, 555 was the Chinese leader’s favorite cigarette. On the day of the Proclamation of the People's Republic of China, Mao Zedong and Liu Shaoqi reportedly smoked 555 cigarettes.

China National Tobacco and British American Tobacco formed a joint venture called CTBAT International Co. Ltd. in 2013, which own the worldwide rights to the brand.

== Sport sponsorship ==
=== Rallying and Formula One ===
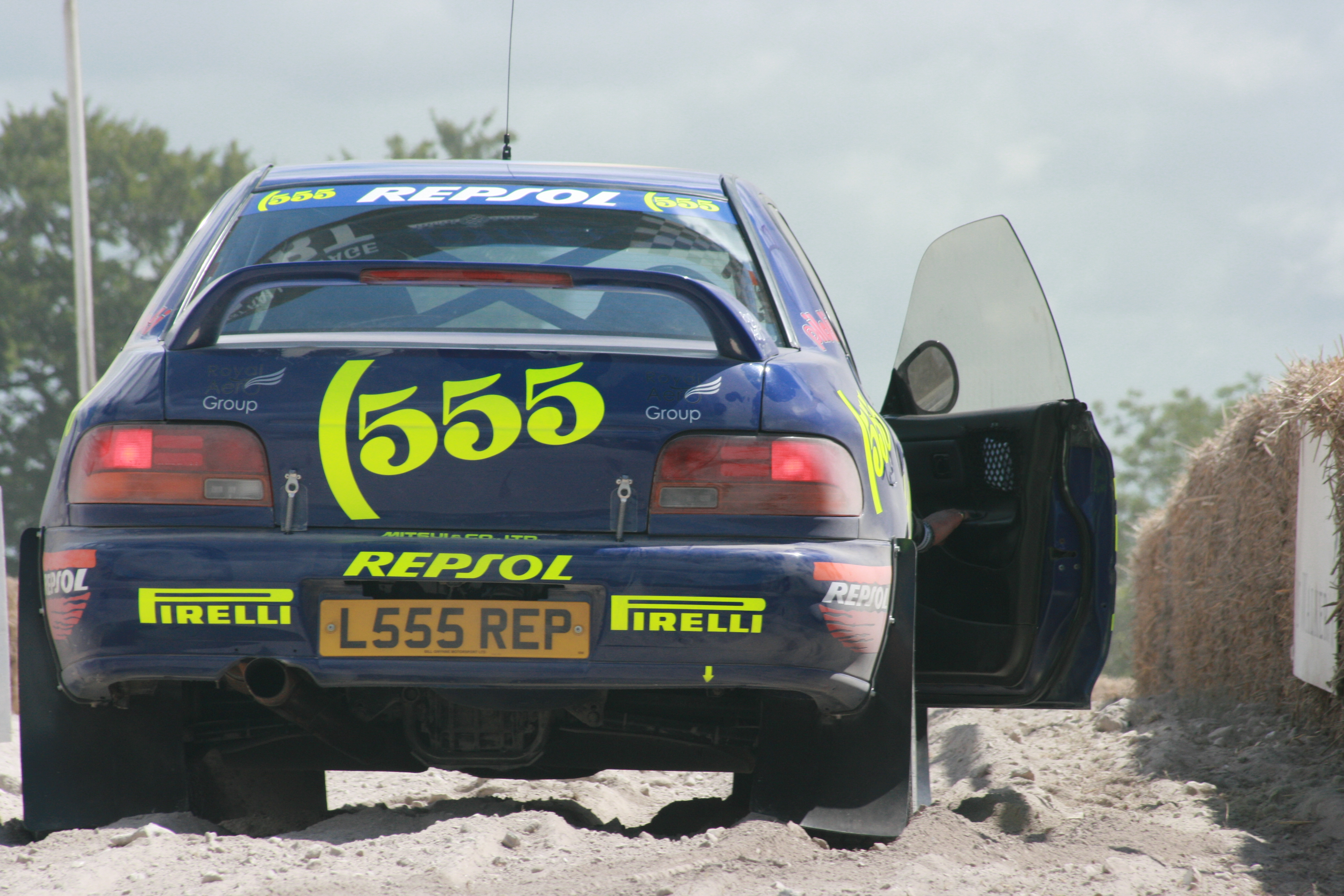
Subaru Impreza WRC with 555 visible on boot lid

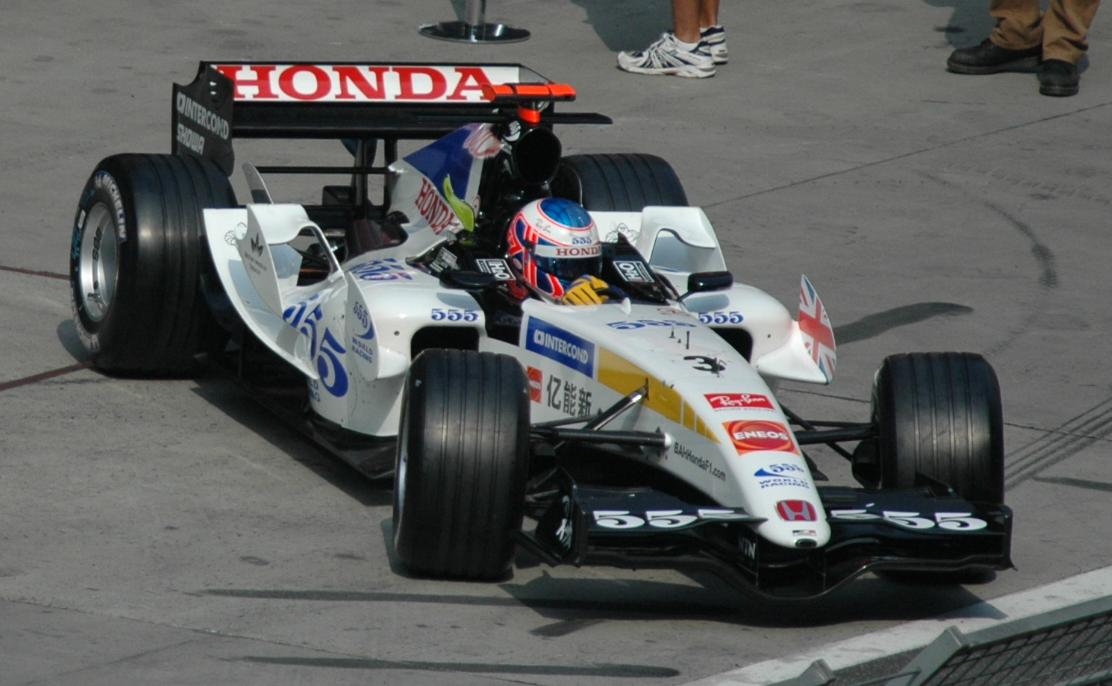
Jenson Button driving for BAR at the 2005 Chinese Grand Prix with a State Express 555 livery instead of the regular Lucky Strike livery

555 sponsors motorsports. 555 World Racing logos were seen on Hong Kong – Beijing Rally cars from 1985 to 1987 and Subaru World Rally Championship cars from 1993 to 2004. It has been speculated that the Subaru 22B, a limited-edition version of the Subaru Impreza WRX STI, took its name from 555, as "22B" is its hexadecimal equivalent. For rallies where tobacco advertising was forbidden, the 555 logos were replaced by three crescent moons.

Even after State Express 555 withdrew its sponsorship, Subaru continued to use the 555 blue and yellow colour scheme as its WRC livery until its withdrawal, but with the manufacturer's own logos in place of the 555 brand. The State Express 555 livery is now regarded as the brand's standard motorsport livery; Vermont SportsCar, which runs United States rally operations for Subaru, continues to use the State Express livery colours at events.

When British American Racing debuted in Formula One in 1999 with the BAR 01, the team originally wanted to brand Ricardo Zonta's car in the blue and yellow livery of 555 World Racing, whilst branding Jacques Villeneuve's car with Lucky Strike colours. However, the move was blocked by the FIA, and they were forced to run two similar liveries. They opted to have the Lucky Strike brand on the left of the car and 555 World Racing on the right, with a zip going along the middle of the nose. It was highly unpopular, and so for the 2000 season, they chose to just display mostly Lucky Strike logos, with small 555 World Racing logos on the side and nose. Some years between 2000 and 2006 (after Honda had bought out BAR, and were under pressure to drop tobacco sponsorship under new EU legislation), they prominently displayed the 555 World Racing brand at the Chinese Grands Prix, where the 555 brand is better known. However, from 2007 until their withdrawal at the end of 2008, Honda adopted a livery with no sponsorship logos at all, but a livery depicted Earth to raise environmental awareness. In countries where tobacco sponsoring was banned, the 555 logos were again replaced by three crescent moons.

=== Other sponsorships ===
- In 1979 and 1982, 555 sponsored badminton.
- From 1979 to 1983, the snooker World Challenge Cup (renamed the World Team Classic in 1981) was sponsored by State Express. The 555 brand was used to sponsor the Asian Open from 1989 to 1992 and the 1991 Belgian Challenge.
- In 1980, 555 sponsored that year's Summer Olympics.
- The rugby league 1984 Challenge Cup was named the State Express Challenge Cup due to sponsorship from State Express.
- In 1992, 555 (with Bentoel Group and Rothmans Group) sponsored the 1992 World Rally Championship season.
- In 1996, Star Trek: The Next Generation on Myanmar TV was sponsored by 555.
