= Kiesa =

Kiesa may refer to:

- Nicolas Kiesa (born 1978), racing driver from Denmark
- Kiesza (born 1989), stage name of Kiesa Rae Ellestad, Canadian singer-songwriter and dancer
