= Renault R23 =

Formula One racing car

Renault R23 Renault R23B
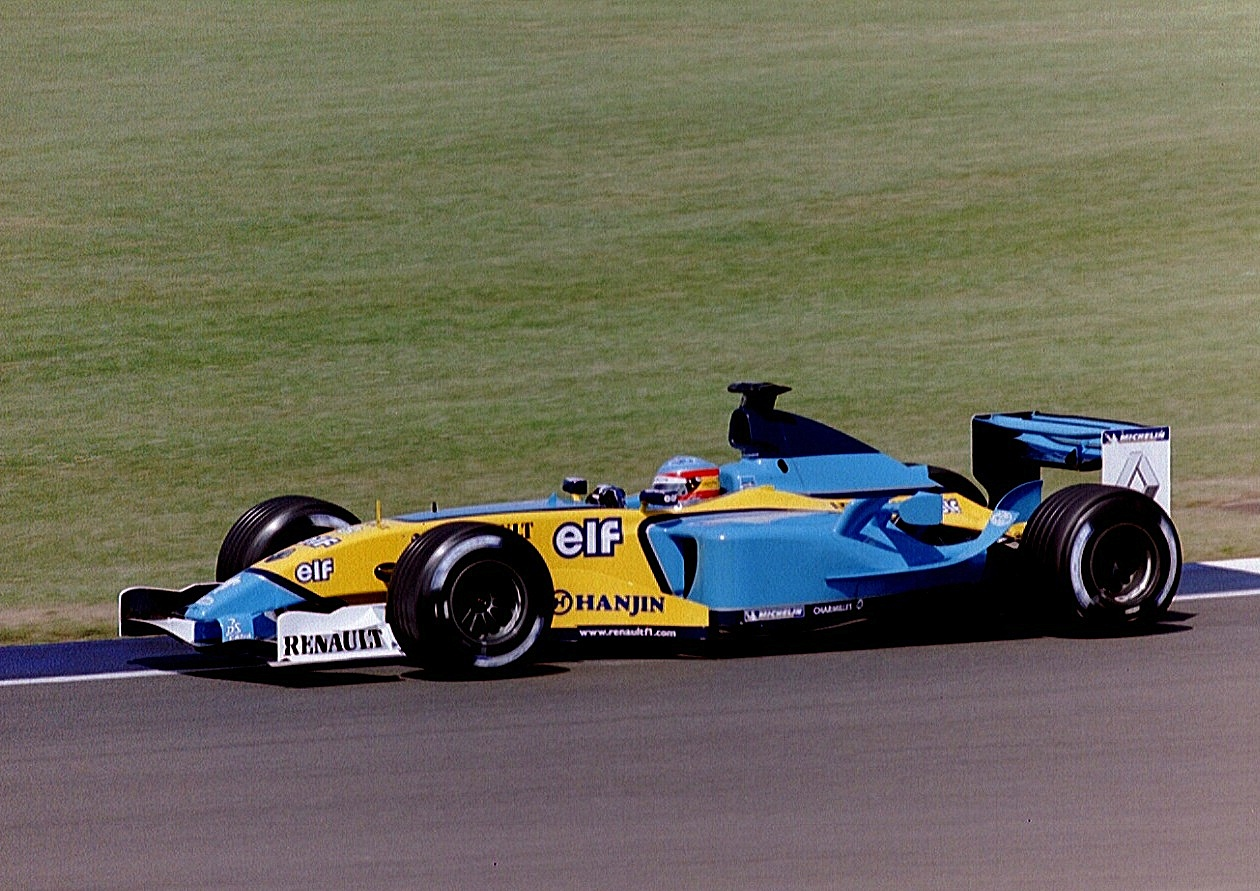
- Fernando Alonso with the R23B at the 2003 British Grand Prix
- Category: Formula One
- Constructor: Renault
- Designers: Pat Symonds (Executive Engineer); Mike Gascoyne (Technical Director); Bob Bell (Deputy Technical Director); Tim Densham (Chief Designer); Tad Czapski (Head of R&D); John Iley (Head of Aerodynamics); Jean-Jacques His (Engine Technical Director); Jean-Philippe Mercier (Project Manager - Engine)
- Predecessor: R202
- Successor: R24

Technical specifications
- Chassis: Moulded carbon fibre and aluminium honeycomb composite monocoque
- Suspension (front): Carbon fibre top and bottom wishbones operate an inboard titanium rocker via a pushrod system
- Suspension (rear): Titanium top and carbon fibre bottom wishbones operating vertically mounted torsion bars and horizontally-mounted damper units mounted on the top of the gearbox casing
- Length: 4,600 mm (181 in)
- Width: 1,800 mm (71 in)
- Height: 950 mm (37 in)
- Axle track: 1,450 mm (57 in) on front; 1,400 mm (55 in) on rear
- Wheelbase: 3,100 mm (122 in)
- Engine: Renault RS23 3.0 L (183 cu in) V10 111° naturally-aspirated, mid engined, longitudinally-mounted
- Transmission: Titanium longitudinal, semi-automatic sequential paddle shift, 6-speed + 1 reverse
- Power: 830–850 hp (619–634 kW) @ 17,800 rpm
- Weight: 600 kg (1,323 lb) including driver and fuel
- Fuel: Elf
- Tyres: Michelin

Competition history
- Notable entrants: Mild Seven Renault F1 Team
- Notable drivers: 7. (Italy) Jarno Trulli; 8. (Spain) Fernando Alonso
- Debut: 2003 Australian Grand Prix
- First win: 2003 Hungarian Grand Prix
- Last win: 2003 Hungarian Grand Prix
- Last event: 2003 Japanese Grand Prix
Races	Wins	Podiums	Poles	F/Laps
16	1	5	2	1
- Constructors' Championships: 0
- Drivers' Championships: 0

The Renault R23 was the car with which the Renault team competed in the 2003 Formula One World Championship. It was driven by Italian Jarno Trulli, who was in his second season with the team, and Spaniard Fernando Alonso, who replaced Jenson Button after the Briton left for British American Racing.

== Design and development ==
=== Name ===
The car was simply named "R23" since the team no longer had a connection with Benetton.

=== Chassis ===
The chassis was designed by Mike Gascoyne, Bob Bell, Tim Densham and John Iley with Pat Symonds overseeing the design and production of the car as executive director of Engineering and Jean-Jacques His leading the engine design. A "B specification" car, the R23B, made its debut in Britain and used for the remainder of the season.

=== Engine ===
Renault was innovative during this period producing non-standard designs such as the 111° 10-cylinder engine for the 2003 RS23 which was designed to effectively lower the center of gravity of the engine and thus improve the car's handling. This eventually proved too unreliable and heavy, so Renault returned to a 72 degree vee angle with the following year's R24.

== Racing history ==
The Renault R23 was launched at an official ceremony in Lucerne, Switzerland in January, 2003. At this initial launch, it was confirmed sponsor Mild Seven would be continuing as the primary sponsor of the team. Just days later, the Renault team re-launched the car at the Paul Ricard Circuit in France. The double launch was caused by Renault promising a branded car launch for sponsor Mild Seven, something that would be illegal in France. Both Trulli and Alonso completed laps of the circuit in the car at Paul Ricard to begin the new season for the team. The team had an extensive pre season test program, including former Toyota driver turned Renault reserve driver Allan McNish. Following the pre-season, the technical team including Pat Symonds were satisfied with the progress from 2002.

The season started well, with both drivers scoring points at the 2003 Australian Grand Prix; Alonso taking advantage of the new points system, which allowed him to secure two points for seventh place. At the following race in Malaysia, Fernando Alonso secured pole position. Alonso was both the youngest driver and first Spaniard to take a pole position in F1 at the time. In the race, Alonso would finish in third, taking his first podium in Formula One.

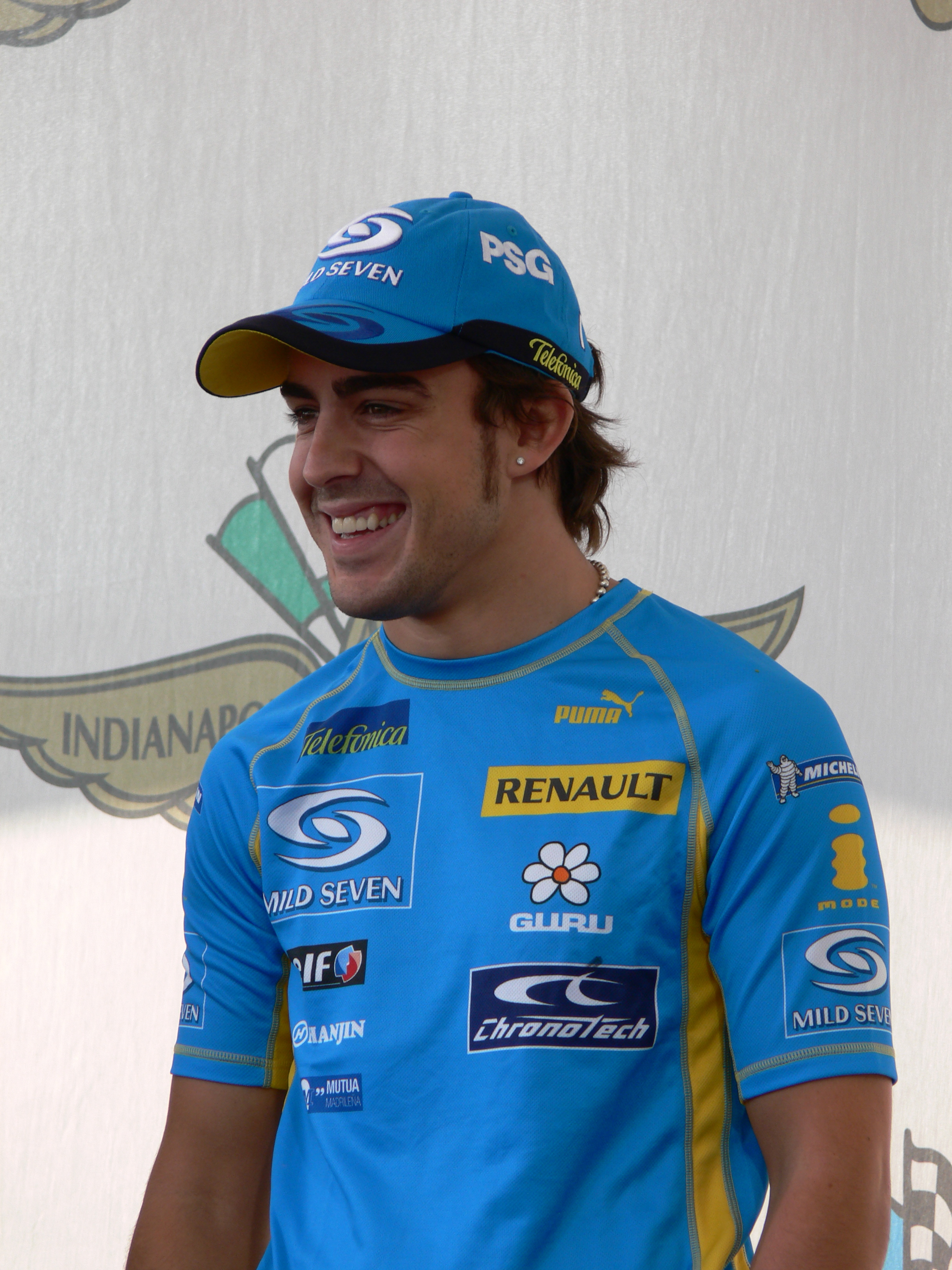
Fernando Alonso won Renault's first Grand Prix as a full constructor since 1983

At the third race of the season in Brazil, Alonso would once again take third place. However, the chaotic Grand Prix saw him secure this following a major accident with debris from an earlier crash caused by Mark Webber in the Jaguar. Whilst Trulli's form in the R23 began to falter, Alonso continued to impress - scoring points on a regular basis and gaining a career best second place at his home race, the 2003 Spanish Grand Prix. Following a double retirement at the 2003 French Grand Prix, Renault introduced the R23B spec car for the British Grand Prix, an aerodynamic upgrade from the original R23. It took Jarno Trulli to a third place podium just weeks later in Germany.

The 2003 Hungarian Grand Prix would be a momentous one for the team. Fernando Alonso won the race, becoming the youngest driver since Bruce McLaren to do 44 years prior. In addition to being the first Spanish driver to win a race in history, Alonso also delivered the team's first victory since Alain Prost at the 1983 Austrian Grand Prix as a full constructor and the 1997 Luxembourg Grand Prix as an engine supplier.

The final three races of the season saw Alonso score one point and two retirements, while teammate Trulli took the R23B to another two points-scoring finishes.

The R23 and R23B steered Renault to a fourth-place finish in the Constructors' Championship with 88 points.

== Sponsorship and livery ==
The livery was similar to the previous season's design with subtle changes.

Renault used the Mild Seven logos, except at the French, British and United States Grands Prix.

== Other use ==
Heikki Kovalainen drove his first test in a Formula One car, the Renault R23, at the Circuit de Catalunya on 2 to 3 December 2003.

== Complete Formula One results ==
(key) (results in bold indicate pole position, results in italics indicate fastest lap)

Year	Entrant	Chassis	Engine	Tyres	Drivers	1	2	3	4	5	6	7	8	9	10	11	12	13	14	15	16	Points	WCC
2003	Renault	R23	RS23 3.0 V10	**M**		AUS	MAL	BRA	SMR	ESP	AUT	MON	CAN	EUR	FRA	GBR	GER	HUN	ITA	USA	JPN	88	4th
2003	Renault	R23	RS23 3.0 V10	**M**	(Italy) Jarno Trulli	5	5	8	13	Ret	8	6	Ret	Ret	Ret							88	4th
2003	Renault	R23	RS23 3.0 V10	**M**	(Spain) Fernando Alonso	7	**3**	3	6	2	Ret	5	4	4	Ret							88	4th
2003	Renault	R23B	RS23 3.0 V10	**M**	(Italy) Jarno Trulli											6	3	7	Ret	4	5	88	4th
2003	Renault	R23B	RS23 3.0 V10	**M**	(Spain) Fernando Alonso											Ret	4	**1**	8	Ret	Ret	88	4th
