= 2001 British Formula Three Championship =

2001 British Formula 3 International Series

Seasons
- ← 2000 2002 →

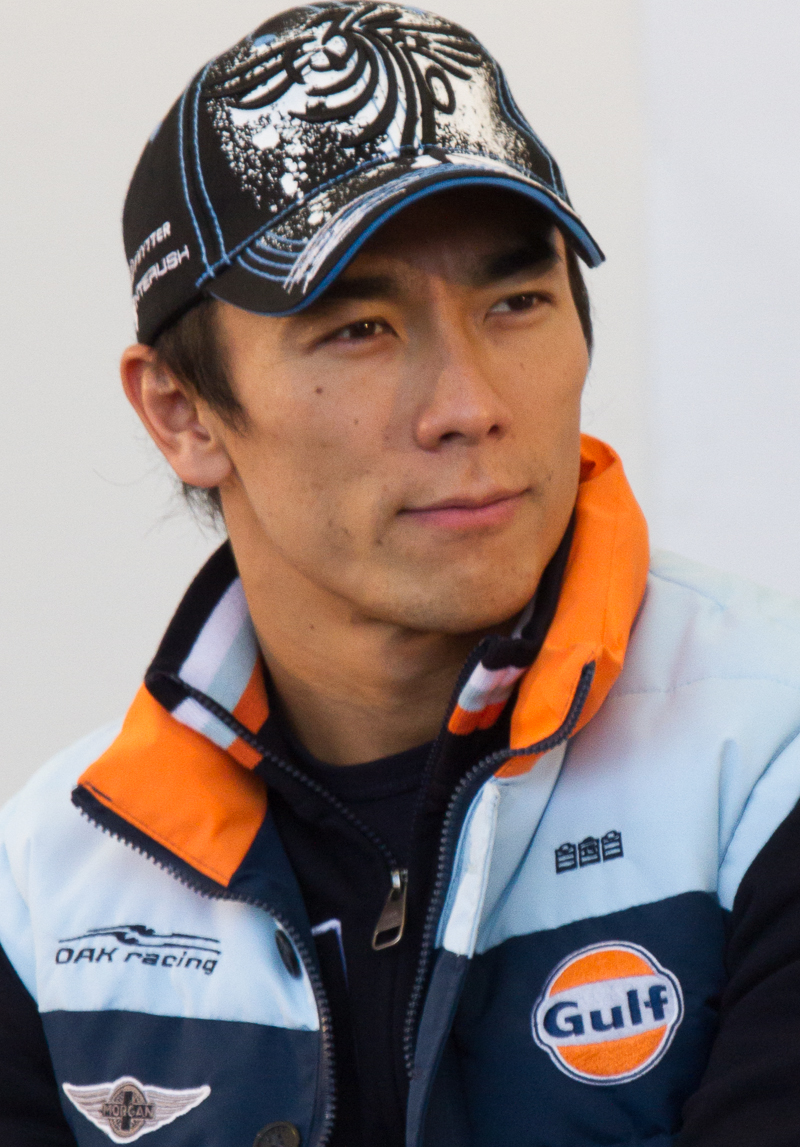
2001 champion, Takuma Sato

The 2001 British Formula Three season was the 51st British Formula Three Championship season. It commenced on 1 April, and ended on 29 September after twenty-six races, with Japanese driver Takuma Sato crowned champion.

The scoring system was 20-15-12-10-8-6-4-3-2-1 points awarded to the first ten finishers, with one extra point added to the driver who set the fastest lap of the race. All results counted towards the driver's final tally.

This was the first British Formula 3 season where all the thirteen scheduled events consisted of two races on the same date.

== Drivers and teams ==
The following teams and drivers were competitors in the 2001 season. The Scholarship class is for older Formula Three cars. All cars competed on Avon tyres.

Team	Chassis	Engine	No	Driver	Rounds
Championship Class
(United Kingdom) Manor Motorsport	Dallara F301	Mugen-Honda	1	(United Kingdom) Derek Hayes	All
(United Kingdom) Manor Motorsport	Dallara F301	Mugen-Honda	2	(United States) Jeffrey Jones	All
(United Kingdom) Manor Motorsport	Dallara F301	Mugen-Honda	21	(United Kingdom) Mark Taylor	All
(United Kingdom) Jaguar Junior Team	Dallara F301	Mugen-Honda	3	(Germany) André Lotterer	All
(United Kingdom) Jaguar Junior Team	Dallara F301	Mugen-Honda	4	(Australia) James Courtney	All
(United Kingdom) Carlin Motorsport	Dallara F301	Mugen-Honda	5	(United Kingdom) Anthony Davidson	All
(United Kingdom) Carlin Motorsport	Dallara F301	Mugen-Honda	6	(Japan) Takuma Sato	All
(United Kingdom) Fortec Motorsport	Dallara F301	Renault Sodemo	7	(United States) Alex Gurney	All
(United Kingdom) Fortec Motorsport	Dallara F301	Renault Sodemo	8	(Italy) Gianmaria Bruni	All
(Italy) RC Prost Junior Team	Dallara F301	Spiess-Opel	9	(Denmark) Nicolas Kiesa	1–6
(Italy) RC Prost Junior Team	Dallara F301	Spiess-Opel	10	(United Kingdom) Ryan Dalziel	1–5
(United Kingdom) Promatecme UK	Dallara F301	Mugen-Honda	11	(France) Bruce Jouanny	All
(United Kingdom) Promatecme UK	Dallara F301	Mugen-Honda	12	(Japan) Atsushi Katsumata	All
(United Kingdom) Team Avanti	Dallara F301	Spiess-Opel	14	(United Kingdom) Matthew Davies	1–7, 9–13
(United Kingdom) Team Avanti	Dallara F301	Spiess-Opel	15	(United Kingdom) Martin O'Connell	1
(United Kingdom) Team Avanti	Dallara F301	Spiess-Opel	15	(Serbia and Montenegro) Miloš Pavlović	2–6
(United Kingdom) Team Avanti	Dallara F301	Spiess-Opel	15	(Japan) Sakon Yamamoto	12–13
(United Kingdom) Alan Docking Racing	Dallara F301	Mugen-Honda	17	(United States) Paul Edwards	1–9
(United Kingdom) Alan Docking Racing	Dallara F301	Mugen-Honda	17	(Japan) Hideaki Nakao	10–11, 13
(United Kingdom) Alan Docking Racing	Dallara F301	Mugen-Honda	18	(United Kingdom) Andy Priaulx	All
(Switzerland) Alain Menu Racing	Dallara F301	Renault Sodemo	19	(United Kingdom) Tim Spouge	1–4
(Switzerland) Alain Menu Racing	Dallara F301	Renault Sodemo	19	(United Kingdom) Ben Collins	6–7
(Switzerland) Alain Menu Racing	Dallara F301	Renault Sodemo	19	(United Kingdom) Tom Sisley	8
(Switzerland) Alain Menu Racing	Dallara F301	Renault Sodemo	20	(United Kingdom) Rob Austin	All
(United Kingdom) Duma Racing	Dallara F301	Mugen-Honda	27	(United Kingdom) Jamie Spence	1–12
(United Kingdom) Duma Racing	Dallara F301	Mugen-Honda	27	(United States) Philip Giebler	13
(United Kingdom) Duma Racing	Dallara F301	Mugen-Honda	28	(United Kingdom) Ryan Dalziel	7, 9–13
Scholarship Class
(United Kingdom) Fred Goddard Racing	Dallara F398	Renault Sodemo	51	(Netherlands) Robert Doornbos	All
(United Kingdom) Parker F3	Dallara F398	Renault Sodemo	52	(United Kingdom) Robbie Kerr	All
(United Kingdom) Parker F3	Dallara F398	Renault Sodemo	62	(Brazil) Rodrigo Gomes	All
(United Kingdom) Carlin Motorsport	Dallara F398	Mugen-Honda	53	(Japan) Kazuki Hoshino	All
(United Kingdom) ME Motorsport	Dallara F398	Mugen-Honda	54	(India) Parthiva Sureshwaren	1–9
(United Kingdom) Team Meritus	Dallara F398	TOM'S Toyota	55	(Republic of Ireland) Michael Keohane	All
(United Kingdom) Team Meritus	Dallara F398	TOM'S Toyota	56	(United Kingdom) Peter Nilsson	1–9, 11–12
(Sweden) Performance Racing	Dallara F398	Opel Spiess	57	(United Kingdom) Iain Brown	1, 12
(Sweden) Performance Racing	Dallara F398	Opel Spiess	57	(United Kingdom) Adam Blair	2–8
(Sweden) Performance Racing	Dallara F398	Opel Spiess	57	(Sweden) Bobby Issazadhe	10
(Sweden) Performance Racing	Dallara F398	Opel Spiess	58	(United Kingdom) Matthew Gilmore	All
(Sweden) Performance Racing	Dallara F398	Opel Spiess	59	(United Kingdom) Justin Sherwood	All
(United Kingdom) Rowan Racing	Dallara F398	TOM'S Toyota	60	(United Kingdom) Aaron Scott	All
(United Kingdom) Shift Motorsport	Dallara F398	Opel Spiess	63	(United Kingdom) Stuart King	1–4
(United Kingdom) Gatellie International	Dallara F398	Opel Spiess	64	(United Kingdom) Stuart Turvey	1
(United Kingdom) Team Park Motorsport	Dallara F398	Opel Spiess	65	(United Kingdom) Rowland Kinch	1, 3, 6, 9, 11–13
(United Kingdom) Diamond Racing	Dallara F398	Mugen-Honda	66	(Switzerland) Harold Primat	All
(United Kingdom) Diamond Racing	Dallara F398	Mugen-Honda	77	(United Kingdom) Mark Mayall	All
(United Kingdom) Diamond Racing	Dallara F398	Mugen-Honda	88	(Japan) Shinsuke Yamazaki	1–3
(United Kingdom) Diamond Racing	Dallara F398	Mugen-Honda	88	(Japan) Tetsuji Masuda	12
(United Kingdom) Head Motorsport	Dallara F398	Mugen-Honda	67	(Australia) Julian Harburg	10, 12
(United Kingdom) Aztech Motorsport	Dallara F398	Mitsubishi	68	(United Kingdom) Craig Murray	1

== Calendar ==
Round		Circuit	Date	Pole Position	Fastest Lap	Winning Driver	Winning Team	Scholarship Class Winner
1	R1	(United Kingdom) Silverstone	1 April	(United Kingdom) Jamie Spence	(Australia) James Courtney	(Australia) James Courtney	Jaguar Junior Team	(United Kingdom) Matthew Gilmore
1	R2	(United Kingdom) Silverstone	1 April	(United Kingdom) Matthew Davies	(Italy) Gianmaria Bruni	(United Kingdom) Matthew Davies	Team Avanti	(United Kingdom) Matthew Gilmore
2	R3	(United Kingdom) Snetterton	15 April	(United Kingdom) Matthew Davies	(United Kingdom) Ryan Dalziel	(United Kingdom) Matthew Davies	Team Avanti	(Netherlands) Robert Doornbos
2	R4	(United Kingdom) Snetterton	15 April	(United States) Paul Edwards	(Japan) Takuma Sato	(United Kingdom) Andy Priaulx	Alan Docking Racing	(United Kingdom) Robbie Kerr
3	R5	(United Kingdom) Donington Park	29 April	(Germany) André Lotterer	(Germany) André Lotterer	(Japan) Takuma Sato	Carlin Motorsport	(Republic of Ireland) Michael Keohane
3	R6	(United Kingdom) Donington Park	29 April	(Germany) André Lotterer	(United Kingdom) Mark Taylor	(Germany) André Lotterer	Jaguar Junior Team	(United Kingdom) Robbie Kerr
4	R7	(United Kingdom) Oulton Park	7 May	(Japan) Takuma Sato	(Japan) Takuma Sato	(Japan) Takuma Sato	Carlin Motorsport	(United Kingdom) Robbie Kerr
4	R8	(United Kingdom) Oulton Park	7 May	(United Kingdom) Anthony Davidson	(Japan) Takuma Sato	(Japan) Takuma Sato	Carlin Motorsport	(Republic of Ireland) Michael Keohane
5	R9	(United Kingdom) Croft Circuit	28 May	(United Kingdom) Derek Hayes	(United Kingdom) Anthony Davidson	(United Kingdom) Anthony Davidson	Carlin Motorsport	(United Kingdom) Mark Mayall
5	R10	(United Kingdom) Croft Circuit	28 May	(United Kingdom) Derek Hayes	(Japan) Takuma Sato	(Japan) Takuma Sato	Carlin Motorsport	(United Kingdom) Robbie Kerr
6	R11	(United Kingdom) Rockinhgam	10 June	(United Kingdom) Derek Hayes	(Japan) Takuma Sato	(Japan) Takuma Sato	Carlin Motorsport	(United Kingdom) Robbie Kerr
6	R12	(United Kingdom) Rockinhgam	10 June	(United Kingdom) Anthony Davidson	(Japan) Takuma Sato	(Japan) Takuma Sato	Carlin Motorsport	(United Kingdom) Robbie Kerr
7	R13	(United Kingdom) Castle Combe Circuit	24 June	(Japan) Takuma Sato	(Japan) Takuma Sato	(United Kingdom) Anthony Davidson	Carlin Motorsport	(United Kingdom) Robbie Kerr
7	R14	(United Kingdom) Castle Combe Circuit	24 June	(United Kingdom) Anthony Davidson	(United Kingdom) Anthony Davidson	(United Kingdom) Anthony Davidson	Carlin Motorsport	(United Kingdom) Matthew Gilmore
8	R15	(United Kingdom) Brands Hatch	8 July	(Japan) Takuma Sato	(Japan) Takuma Sato	(United Kingdom) Derek Hayes	Manor Motorsport	(United Kingdom) Robbie Kerr
8	R16	(United Kingdom) Brands Hatch	8 July	(Australia) James Courtney	(Japan) Takuma Sato	(Japan) Takuma Sato	Carlin Motorsport	(United Kingdom) Robbie Kerr
9	R17	(United Kingdom) Donington Park	22 July	(Japan) Takuma Sato	(United Kingdom) Anthony Davidson	(Italy) Gianmaria Bruni	Fortec Motorsport	(Republic of Ireland) Michael Keohane
9	R18	(United Kingdom) Donington Park	22 July	(Japan) Takuma Sato	(Japan) Takuma Sato	(Japan) Takuma Sato	Carlin Motorsport	(United Kingdom) Robbie Kerr
10	R19	(United Kingdom) Knockhill Racing Circuit	19 August	(United Kingdom) Andy Priaulx	(Japan) Takuma Sato	(Japan) Takuma Sato	Carlin Motorsport	(Brazil) Rodrigo Gomes
10	R20	(United Kingdom) Knockhill Racing Circuit	19 August	(United Kingdom) Anthony Davidson	Race cancelled due to adverse weather			
11	R20	(United Kingdom) Thruxton Circuit	1 September	(United Kingdom) Anthony Davidson	(Japan) Takuma Sato	(Japan) Takuma Sato	Carlin Motorsport	(Netherlands) Robert Doornbos
11	R21	(United Kingdom) Thruxton Circuit	2 September	(United Kingdom) Anthony Davidson	(United Kingdom) Anthony Davidson	(United Kingdom) Anthony Davidson	Carlin Motorsport	(United Kingdom) Mark Mayall
11	R22	(United Kingdom) Thruxton Circuit	2 September	(United Kingdom) Anthony Davidson	(United Kingdom) Anthony Davidson	(United Kingdom) Anthony Davidson	Carlin Motorsport	(Republic of Ireland) Michael Keohane
12	R23	(United Kingdom) Brands Hatch	16 September	(United Kingdom) Anthony Davidson	(United Kingdom) Anthony Davidson	(United Kingdom) Anthony Davidson	Carlin Motorsport	(United Kingdom) Matthew Gilmore
12	R24	(United Kingdom) Brands Hatch	16 September	(Australia) James Courtney	(Japan) Takuma Sato	(Japan) Takuma Sato	Carlin Motorsport	(United Kingdom) Matthew Gilmore
13	R25	(United Kingdom) Silverstone	29 September	(Germany) André Lotterer	(Japan) Takuma Sato	(United Kingdom) Andy Priaulx	Alan Docking Racing	(Republic of Ireland) Michael Keohane
13	R26	(United Kingdom) Silverstone	29 September	(Japan) Takuma Sato	(Japan) Takuma Sato	(Japan) Takuma Sato	Carlin Motorsport	(United Kingdom) Matthew Gilmore

== Standings ==
Championship's point system was 20–15–12–10–8–6–4–3–2–1 with an extra point for the fastest lap.

Pos	Driver	SIL (United Kingdom)		SNE (United Kingdom)		DON (United Kingdom)		OUL (United Kingdom)		CRO (United Kingdom)		ROC (United Kingdom)		CAS (United Kingdom)		BRH (United Kingdom)		DON (United Kingdom)		KNO (Note: Stand-alone races were held for the Championship and Scholarship classes due to the grid size.) (United Kingdom)		THR (United Kingdom)			BRH (United Kingdom)		SIL (United Kingdom)		Pts
Championship Class
1	(Japan) Takuma Sato	12	4	Ret	2	1	Ret	1	1	DSQ	1	1	1	2	2	9	1	12	1	1	C	1	2	8	2	1	18	1	345
2	(United Kingdom) Anthony Davidson	7	11	8	13	8	Ret	3	3	1	12	4	2	1	1	5	19	Ret	5	2	C	2	1	1	1	3	2	2	272
3	(United Kingdom) Derek Hayes	3	3	2	4	4	3	8	4	DSQ	3	3	7	4	5	1	6	3	6	5	C	5	6	3	3	5	Ret	6	234
4	(Australia) James Courtney	1	8	6	6	7	2	7	Ret	3	9	6	4	3	3	2	2	Ret	8	3	C	4	5	2	10	2	4	4	227
5	(Italy) Gianmaria Bruni	5	2	3	10	3	6	2	9	Ret	5	DNS	Ret	8	11	8	10	1	7	6	C	Ret	3	11	7	8	5	3	156
6	(United Kingdom) Andy Priaulx	2	5	11	1	11	4	6	6	2	Ret	2	10	11	14	10	8	8	20	10	C	3	9	6	9	Ret	1	Ret	146
7	(Germany) André Lotterer	Ret	9	7	9	2	1	Ret	16	6	7	5	3	6	6	3	7	2	4	Ret	C	8	13	7	DNS	6	20	8	143
8	(United Kingdom) Matthew Davies	6	1	1	8	12	Ret	4	2	8	8	10	8	9	9			Ret	2	Ret	C	10	10	5	5	7	8	5	136
9	(United Kingdom) Mark Taylor	14	10	10	Ret	13	Ret	9	10	Ret	Ret	Ret	Ret	DNS	8	6	3	5	13	4	C	7	4	4	Ret	4	3	Ret	91
10	(France) Bruce Jouanny	Ret	15	Ret	14	DNS	15	5	Ret	Ret	6	7	9	5	10	13	5	11	3	7	C	6	Ret	DNS	12	Ret	6	11	65
11	(United Kingdom) Jamie Spence	Ret	Ret	14	18	9	Ret	11	5	Ret	2	9	Ret	10	4	7	Ret	6	14	Ret	C	13	7	13	4	10			63
12	(United States) Paul Edwards	4	Ret	13	3	5	11	DNS	11	7	10	11	Ret	13	17	4	4	9	12										57
13	(United Kingdom) Ryan Dalziel	Ret	13	4	7	10	5	12	12	10	11			7	7			7	11	9	C	11	8	9	6	13	7	10	55
14	(Denmark) Nicolas Kiesa	8	7	5	5	16	Ret	13	8	4	4	DNQ	Ret																46
15	(United States) Jeffrey Jones	11	12	12	16	6	7	Ret	14	5	Ret	28	6	12	12	14	9	4	9	11	C	16	11	12	11	14	12	12	38
16	(United States) Alex Gurney	16	Ret	15	12	17	9	14	13	9	DNS	17	DNS	16	18	12	15	16	10	8	C	9	15	Ret	8	9	13	9	17
17	(Serbia and Montenegro) Miloš Pavlović			9	11	14	Ret	10	7	11	Ret	Ret	5																15
18	(United Kingdom) Martin O'Connell	9	6																										8
19	(United Kingdom) Rob Austin	13	17	16	19	15	8	15	21	DNS	13	12	23	14	15	Ret	12	17	21	13	C	12	14	Ret	13	11	10	7	8
20	(United Kingdom) Ben Collins											8	16	DNS	DNS														3
21	(Japan) Atsushi Katsumata	10	14	17	17	18	22	Ret	15	DNS	DNS	16	Ret	17	13	Ret	17	10	25	Ret	C	26	12	10	Ret	12	14	13	3
22	(United States) Philip Giebler																										9	Ret	2
23	(United Kingdom) Tim Spouge	20	16	18	DNS	DNS	10	17	Ret																				1
24	(Japan) Hideaki Nakao																			12	C	23	24	16			Ret	17	0
25	(Japan) Sakon Yamamoto																								Ret	15	Ret	Ret	0
	(United Kingdom) Tom Sisley															Ret	DNS												0
Scholarship Class
1	(United Kingdom) Robbie Kerr	32	22	Ret	15	Ret	12	16	DSQ	18	14	13	11	15	19	11	11	14	15	3	C	19	17	15	15	20	Ret	16	335
2	(United Kingdom) Matthew Gilmore	15	18	20	21	23	14	20	20	14	23	22	14	18	16	15	16	15	18	2	C	15	19	18	14	16	Ret	14	333
3	(Republic of Ireland) Michael Keohane	17	Ret	27	24	19	13	24	17	16	15	15	12	Ret	Ret	18	13	13	16	Ret	C	18	20	14	16	17	11	Ret	280
4	(United Kingdom) Mark Mayall	18	19	DNQ	23	20	19	21	19	12	18	23	18	20	21	Ret	25	18	22	5	C	17	16	17	21	23	Ret	19	212
5	(Netherlands) Robert Doornbos	21	21	19	Ret	Ret	18	19	22	Ret	17	19	17	19	Ret	17	18	Ret	19	4	C	14	Ret	19	19	18	Ret	Ret	182
6	(Brazil) Rodrigo Gomes	19	30	Ret	25	Ret	DNQ	DNS	25	17	16	18	15	25	Ret	16	14	20	17	1	C	25	21	20	18	19	Ret	15	164
7	(Japan) Kazuki Hoshino	22	Ret	DNS	22	24	DNQ	18	18	21	Ret	20	DNS	21	22	Ret	21	Ret	24	Ret	C	20	18	21	17	21	16	Ret	133
8	(United Kingdom) Justin Sherwood	25	25	21	26	21	17	Ret	24	15	20	21	20	24	20	Ret	20	Ret	23	Ret	C	21	Ret	22	20	22	15	Ret	119
9	(United Kingdom) Adam Blair		20	24	20	Ret	16	DNS	DNS	13	DNQ	14	13	Ret	Ret	Ret	23												87
10	(United Kingdom) Aaron Scott	26	Ret	DNQ	DNQ	DNS	23	22	28	20	21	24	21	23	Ret	20	Ret	21	28	6	C	22	Ret	Ret	23	24	21	20	51
11	(India) Parthiva Sureshwaren	28	27	23	Ret	Ret	20	23	23	19	19	25	19	22	23	Ret	22	Ret	DNS										49
12	(Switzerland) Harold Primat	33	29	DNQ	DNQ	DNQ	DNQ	DNS	26	DNQ	DNQ	26	22	DNQ	DNQ	Ret	DNS	19	27	7	C	24	22	Ret	Ret	26	17	18	41
13	(United Kingdom) Peter Nilsson	29	26	25	DNQ	22	24	DNQ	27	DNQ	22	27	DNQ	DNQ	DNQ	19	24	DSQ	26				Ret	23	22	25			33
14	(United Kingdom) Stuart King	23	24	22	Ret	Ret	21	DNQ	DNS																				20
15	(United Kingdom) Rowland Kinch	31	Ret			DNQ	DNQ					DNQ	DNQ					DNQ	DNQ				23	24	26	28	19	Ret	12
16	(United Kingdom) Craig Murray	24	23																										9
17	(Japan) Shinsuke Yamazaki	30	28	26	DNQ	25	25																						7
18	(Australia) Julian Harburg																			8	C					Ret			3
19	(United Kingdom) Iain Brown	27																							24	Ret			0
20	(Japan) Tetsuji Masuda																								25	27			0
	(United Kingdom) Stuart Turvey	Ret	Ret																										0
	(Sweden) Bobby Issazadhe																			Ret	C								0
Pos	Driver	SIL (United Kingdom)		SNE (United Kingdom)		DON (United Kingdom)		OUL (United Kingdom)		CRO (United Kingdom)		ROC (United Kingdom)		CAS (United Kingdom)		BRH (United Kingdom)		DON (United Kingdom)		KNO (United Kingdom)		THR (United Kingdom)			BRH (United Kingdom)		SIL (United Kingdom)		Pts
