= Tony Schmidt =

German racing driver (born 1980)

- Nationality: (Germany) German
- Born: 9 May 1980 (age 46) Leipzig, East Germany

Previous series
- 2002–04 1999–2001 1999 1999: International Formula 3000; German Formula Three Championship; Formula Renault Germany; Italian Formula Three Championship

Tony Schmidt (born 9 May 1980 in Leipzig) is a German racing driver.

== Career ==
=== Formula Three ===
Schmidt competed in German Formula Three from 1999 to 2001, establishing himself as a midfield runner. He also scored three podium finishes during these seasons, and competed in the Masters of Formula Three race twice.

=== Formula 3000 ===
Schmidt competed in three seasons of Formula 3000 from 2002 to 2004, again as a midfield runner. Despite developing into a consistent points scorer, he did not get a drive in the GP2 Series which replaced F3000 for 2005.

== Racing record ==
=== Complete International Formula 3000 results ===
(key) (Races in bold indicate pole position; races in italics indicate fastest lap.)

Year	Entrant	1	2	3	4	5	6	7	8	9	10	11	12	DC	Points
2002	PSM Racing Line	INT; 16	IMO; Ret	CAT; 13	A1R; 14	MON; Ret	NUR; Ret	SIL; Ret	MAG; 13	HOC; Ret	HUN; 14	SPA; 11	MNZ; 12	NC	0
2003	Team Astromega	IMO; Ret	CAT; 6	A1R; Ret	MON; Ret	NUR; 10	MAG; 5	SIL; Ret	HOC; 6	HUN; 8	MNZ; 6			11th	14
2004	Ma-Con Engineering	IMO; 10	CAT	MON; 11	NUR; 14	MAG; 7	SIL; 7	HOC; 5	HUN; 11	SPA; 6	MNZ; Ret			10th	11
