= PSM Racing Line =

German auto racing team

(Germany) PSM Racing Line
- Founded: 2002
- Folded: 2002
- Former series: Formula 3000

PSM Racing Line was a German auto racing team, who competed in the FIA Formula 3000 Championship.

== History ==
PSM Racing Line participated in the Formula 3000 season in 2002. The stable replaced the Prost Junior Team stable because it did not submit an application before the deadline.

== Complete Formula 3000 results ==
Year	Chassis	Engine	Tyres	Drivers	1	2	3	4	5	6	7	8	9	10	11	12	T.C.	Points
2002	Lola B02/50	Zytek V8	A		INT	IMO	CAT	A1R	MON	NÜR	SIL	MAG	HOC	HUN	SPA	MNZ	8th	3
2002	Lola B02/50	Zytek V8	A	(Germany) Tony Schmidt	16	Ret	13	14	Ret	Ret	Ret	13	Ret	14	11	12	8th	3
2002	Lola B02/50	Zytek V8	A	(Denmark) Nicolas Kiesa	15	8	Ret	10	Ret	10	10	Ret	Ret	Ret	6	5	8th	3
