= 2002 International Formula 3000 Championship =

Motor racing competition

The 2002 International Formula 3000 season was the thirty-sixth season of the second-tier of Formula One feeder championship and also eighteenth season under the International Formula 3000 Championship moniker. It featured the 2002 FIA Formula 3000 International Championship which was contested over twelve races from 30 March to 14 September 2002. Championship titles were awarded for both Drivers and Teams.

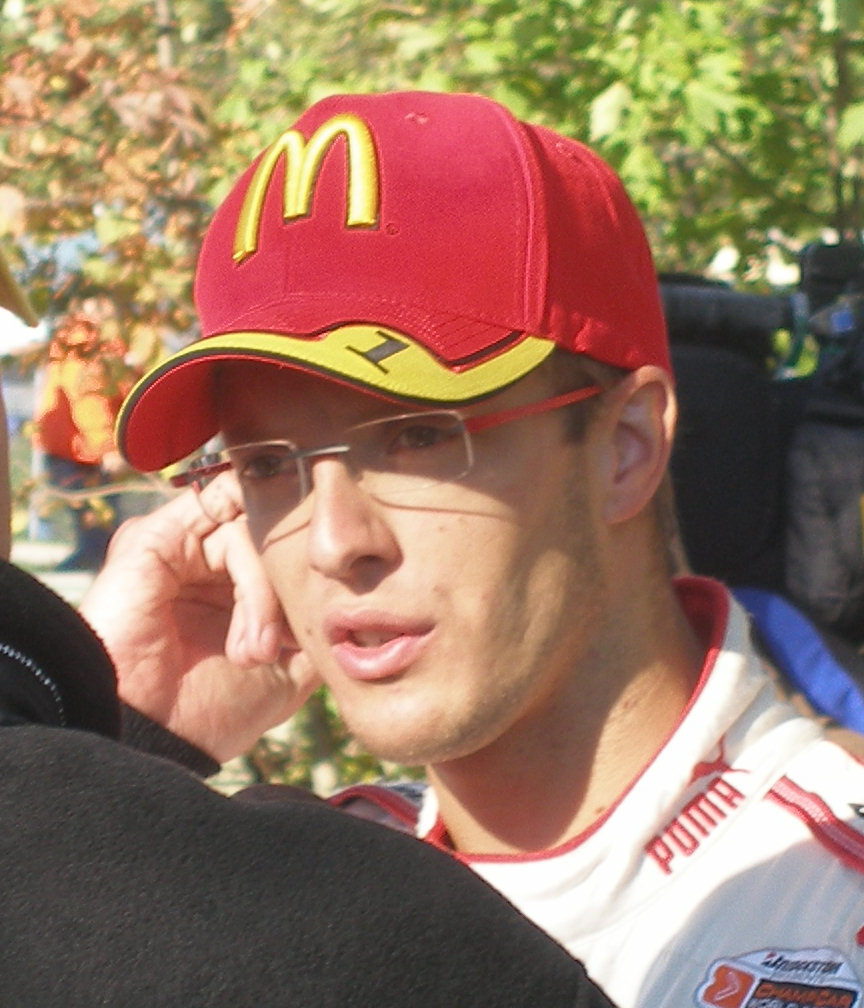
Sébastien Bourdais (pictured in 2006), won the Drivers Championship driving for Super Nova Racing.

== Teams and drivers ==
The following teams and drivers contested the 2002 FIA Formula 3000 International Championship.

Team	No.	Driver	Rounds
(United Kingdom) Coca-Cola Nordic Racing	1	(Australia) Ryan Briscoe	1–7
(United Kingdom) Coca-Cola Nordic Racing	1	(Sweden) Thed Björk	8–12
(United Kingdom) Coca-Cola Nordic Racing	2	(Hungary) Zsolt Baumgartner	All
(Brazil) Petrobras Junior Team	3	(Brazil) Antônio Pizzonia	All
(Brazil) Petrobras Junior Team	4	(Brazil) Ricardo Sperafico	All
(United Kingdom) Super Nova Racing	5	(France) Sébastien Bourdais	All
(United Kingdom) Super Nova Racing	6	(Portugal) Tiago Monteiro	All
(Austria) Red Bull Junior Team	9	(Austria) Patrick Friesacher	All
(Austria) Red Bull Junior Team	10	(Brazil) Ricardo Mauricio	All
(Belgium) Team Astromega	14	(Brazil) Mario Haberfeld	All
(Belgium) Team Astromega	15	(Australia) Rob Nguyen	All
(Italy) European Minardi F3000	16	(Brazil) Alexandre Sperafico	1–9
(Italy) European Minardi F3000	16	(United Kingdom) Justin Keen	10–12
(Italy) European Minardi F3000	17	(Belgium) David Saelens	1–5
(Italy) European Minardi F3000	17	(Germany) Alex Müller	6–9
(Italy) European Minardi F3000	17	(Denmark) Kristian Kolby	10–12
(United Kingdom) Arden International	18	(Sweden) Björn Wirdheim	All
(United Kingdom) Arden International	19	(Czech Republic) Tomáš Enge	All
(Italy) Durango Formula	20	(Germany) Alex Müller	1–5
(Italy) Durango Formula	20	(United States) Derek Hill	6–12
(Italy) Durango Formula	21	(Brazil) Rodrigo Sperafico	All
(Italy) Coloni F3000	24	(Italy) Enrico Toccacelo	All
(Italy) Coloni F3000	25	(Italy) Giorgio Pantano	All
(Germany) PSM Racing Line	26	(Germany) Tony Schmidt	All
(Germany) PSM Racing Line	27	(Denmark) Nicolas Kiesa	All

Note: Each entry used a Lola B02/50 chassis with a Zytek-Judd KV engine and Avon tyres, as mandated by the championship regulations.

== Calendar ==
The FIA Formula 3000 International Championship was contested over twelve races.

Round	Circuit	Date	Laps	Distance	Time	Speed	Pole position	Fastest lap	Winner	Winning team	Report
1	(Brazil) Autódromo José Carlos Pace	30 March	35	4.309=150.785 km	0'53:24.841	169.395 km/h	(France) Sébastien Bourdais	(France) Sébastien Bourdais	(Brazil) Rodrigo Sperafico	(Italy) Durango Formula	Report
2	(Italy) Autodromo Enzo e Dino Ferrari	13 April	32	4.933=157.619 km	0'51:39.076	183.096 km/h	(France) Sébastien Bourdais	(Italy) Giorgio Pantano	(France) Sébastien Bourdais	(United Kingdom) Super Nova Racing	Report
3	(Spain) Circuit de Catalunya	27 April	32	4.728=151.233 km	0'51:44.572	175.367 km/h	(France) Sébastien Bourdais	(France) Sébastien Bourdais	(Italy) Giorgio Pantano	(Italy) Coloni F3000	Report
4	(Austria) A1 Ring	11 May	35	4.326=151.410 km	0'48:53.862	185.788 km/h	(Czech Republic) Tomáš Enge	(Czech Republic) Tomáš Enge	(Czech Republic) Tomáš Enge	(United Kingdom) Arden Team Russia	Report
5	Circuit de Monaco	25 May	45	3.37=151.65 km	1'07:40.545	134.449 km/h	(France) Sébastien Bourdais	(Czech Republic) Tomáš Enge	(France) Sébastien Bourdais	(United Kingdom) Super Nova Racing	Report
6	(Germany) Nürburgring	22 June	30	5.138=154.14 km	0'54:55.289	168.393 km/h	(France) Sébastien Bourdais	(Czech Republic) Tomáš Enge	(France) Sébastien Bourdais	(United Kingdom) Super Nova Racing	Report
7	(United Kingdom) Silverstone Circuit	6 July	30	5.141=154.126 km	0'49:45.388	185.856 km/h	(Czech Republic) Tomáš Enge	(Czech Republic) Tomáš Enge	(Czech Republic) Tomáš Enge	(United Kingdom) Arden Team Russia	Report
8	(France) Circuit de Nevers Magny-Cours	20 July	35	4.251=148.599 km	0'54:58.076	162.202 km/h	(Czech Republic) Tomáš Enge	(Czech Republic) Tomáš Enge	(Czech Republic) Tomáš Enge	(United Kingdom) Arden Team Russia	Report
9	(Germany) Hockenheimring	27 July	33	4.574=150.942 km	0'50:00.768	181.084 km/h	(Italy) Giorgio Pantano	(Brazil) Ricardo Sperafico	(Italy) Giorgio Pantano	(Italy) Coloni F3000	Report
10	(Hungary) Hungaroring	17 August	38	3.975=151.044 km	0'59:25.829	152.491 km/h	(Czech Republic) Tomáš Enge	(Brazil) Ricardo Sperafico	(Italy) Enrico Toccacelo	(Italy) Coloni F3000	Report
11	(Belgium) Circuit de Spa-Francorchamps	31 August	22	6.968=153.296 km	0'47:06.609	195.239 km/h	(France) Sébastien Bourdais	(France) Sébastien Bourdais	(Italy) Giorgio Pantano	(Italy) Coloni F3000	Report
12	(Italy) Autodromo Nazionale Monza	14 September	26	5.793=150.353 km	0'44:57.538	200.654 km/h	(Sweden) Björn Wirdheim	(Italy) Giorgio Pantano	(Sweden) Björn Wirdheim	(United Kingdom) Arden Team Russia	Report

Note: The race time/average speed for the provisional winner of Race 10 (Tomáš Enge) was 0'59:24.642/152.546 km/h. Enge was subsequently disqualified after failing a drug test.

== Championship standings ==
=== Teams Championship ===
Teams Championship points were awarded on a 10-6-4-3-2-1 basis for the first six places at each race with points from both team cars counting towards each team’s total.

Position	Team	(Brazil)	(Italy)	(Spain)	(Austria)	(Monaco)	(Germany)	(United Kingdom)	(France)	(Germany)	(Hungary)	(Belgium)	(Italy)	Points
1	Arden International	2	1	6	16	4	1	11	10	6	3	3	16	79
2	Coloni F3000	1	4	11	4	–	–	3	5	10	16	10	4	68
3	Super Nova Racing	0	10	4	0	10	10	6	6	2	4	6	0	58
4	Petrobras Junior Team	3	3	0	0	5	10	6	3	1	2	4	3	40
5	Red Bull Junior Team	4	2	3	2	6	3	0	0	–	1	2	–	23
6	Durango Formula	10	6	0	0	–	0	0	0	4	0	0	0	20
7	Team Astromega	6	0	2	4	1	2	0	2	3	0	0	0	20
8	PSM Racing Line	0	0	0	0	–	0	0	0	–	0	1	2	3
9	Coca-Cola Nordic Racing	0	0	0	0	–	0	0	0	0	0	0	1	1
10	European Minardi F3000	–	0	0	–	–	0	0	0	–	0	0	0	0

== Race results ==
Drivers Championship points were awarded at each race as follows: 10 points to the winner, 6 for runner-up, 4 for third place, 3 for fourth place, 2 for fifth place and 1 for sixth place.

Pos	Driver	INT (Brazil)	IMO (Italy)	CAT (Spain)	A1R (Austria)	MON (Monaco)	NÜR (Germany)	SIL (United Kingdom)	MAG (France)	HOC (Germany)	HUN (Hungary)	SPA (Belgium)	MNZ (Italy)	Points
1	(France) Sébastien Bourdais	**14**	**1**	**3**	Ret	**1**	**1**	2	2	Ret	3	**2**	Ret	56
2	(Italy) Giorgio Pantano	8	3	1	4	Ret	Ret	4	3	**1**	2	1	3	54
3	(Czech Republic) Tomáš Enge	Ret	6	2	**1**	3	13	**1**	**1**	Ret	DSQ	4	2	50
4	(Sweden) Björn Wirdheim	5	7	8	2	Ret	6	6	Ret	2	4	Ret	**1**	29
5	(Brazil) Ricardo Sperafico	7	14	9	8	5	2	3	15	6	5	3	4	22
6	(Brazil) Rodrigo Sperafico	1	2	7	12	Ret	8	9	8	3	Ret	12	8	20
7	(Brazil) Mário Haberfeld	2	Ret	5	3	6	Ret	Ret	5	4	Ret	14	9	18
8	(Brazil) Antônio Pizzonia	4	4	10	7	4	3	5	4	Ret	Ret	Ret	DSQ	18
9	(Italy) Enrico Toccacelo	6	12	6	6	Ret	Ret	8	6	Ret	1	Ret	Ret	14
10	(Austria) Patrick Friesacher	10	5	11	5	2	4	7	7	Ret	6	16	Ret	14
11	(Brazil) Ricardo Maurício	3	Ret	4	15	7	9	Ret	10	Ret	11	5	Ret	9
12	(Denmark) Nicolas Kiesa	15	8	Ret	10	Ret	10	10	Ret	Ret	Ret	6	5	3
13	(Portugal) Tiago Monteiro	9	10	Ret	16	Ret	Ret	13	9	5	13	Ret	10	2
14	(Australia) Rob Nguyen	13	11	14	9	Ret	5	15	11	11	10	15	Ret	2
15	(Hungary) Zsolt Baumgartner	Ret	9	Ret	11	Ret	12	14	12	8	7	8	6	1
16	(Sweden) Thed Björk								Ret	7	8	13	7	0
17	(United States) Derek Hill						7	Ret	Ret	9	Ret	7	Ret	0
18	(United Kingdom) Justin Keen										9	9	Ret	0
19	(Denmark) Kristian Kolby										12	10	11	0
20	(Germany) Alex Müller	11	Ret	Ret	13	DSQ	Ret	11	14	Ret				0
21	(Germany) Tony Schmidt	16	Ret	13	14	Ret	Ret	Ret	13	Ret	14	11	12	0
22	(Brazil) Alexandre Sperafico	Ret	15	15	Ret	Ret	11	Ret	Ret	Ret				0
23	(Australia) Ryan Briscoe	12	13	12	17	Ret	Ret	12						0
24	(Belgium) David Saelens	Ret	Ret	16	Ret	Ret								0
Pos	Driver	INT (Brazil)	IMO (Italy)	CAT (Spain)	A1R (Austria)	MON (Monaco)	NÜR (Germany)	SIL (United Kingdom)	MAG (France)	HOC (Germany)	HUN (Hungary)	SPA (Belgium)	MNZ (Italy)	Points

Colour	Result
Gold	Winner
Silver	Second place
Bronze	Third place
Green	Points classification
Blue	Non-points classification
Blue	Non-classified finish (NC)
Purple	Retired, not classified (Ret)
Red	Did not qualify (DNQ)
Red	Did not pre-qualify (DNPQ)
Black	Disqualified (DSQ)
White	Did not start (DNS)
White	Withdrew (WD)
White	Race cancelled (C)
Blank	Did not practice (DNP)
Blank	Did not arrive (DNA)
Blank	Excluded (EX)

**Bold** – Pole
Italics – Fastest lap

=== Notes ===
- Tomáš Enge was disqualified from first place in Hungary after failing a drug test.
- Antônio Pizzonia was disqualified from second place at Monza in Italy for running a rear wing element upside-down.
- Alexander Müller was disqualified from sixth place at Monaco when his car was found to be underweight.
