= 2000 British Formula Three Championship =

2000 British Formula 3 International Series

Seasons
- ← 1999 2001 →

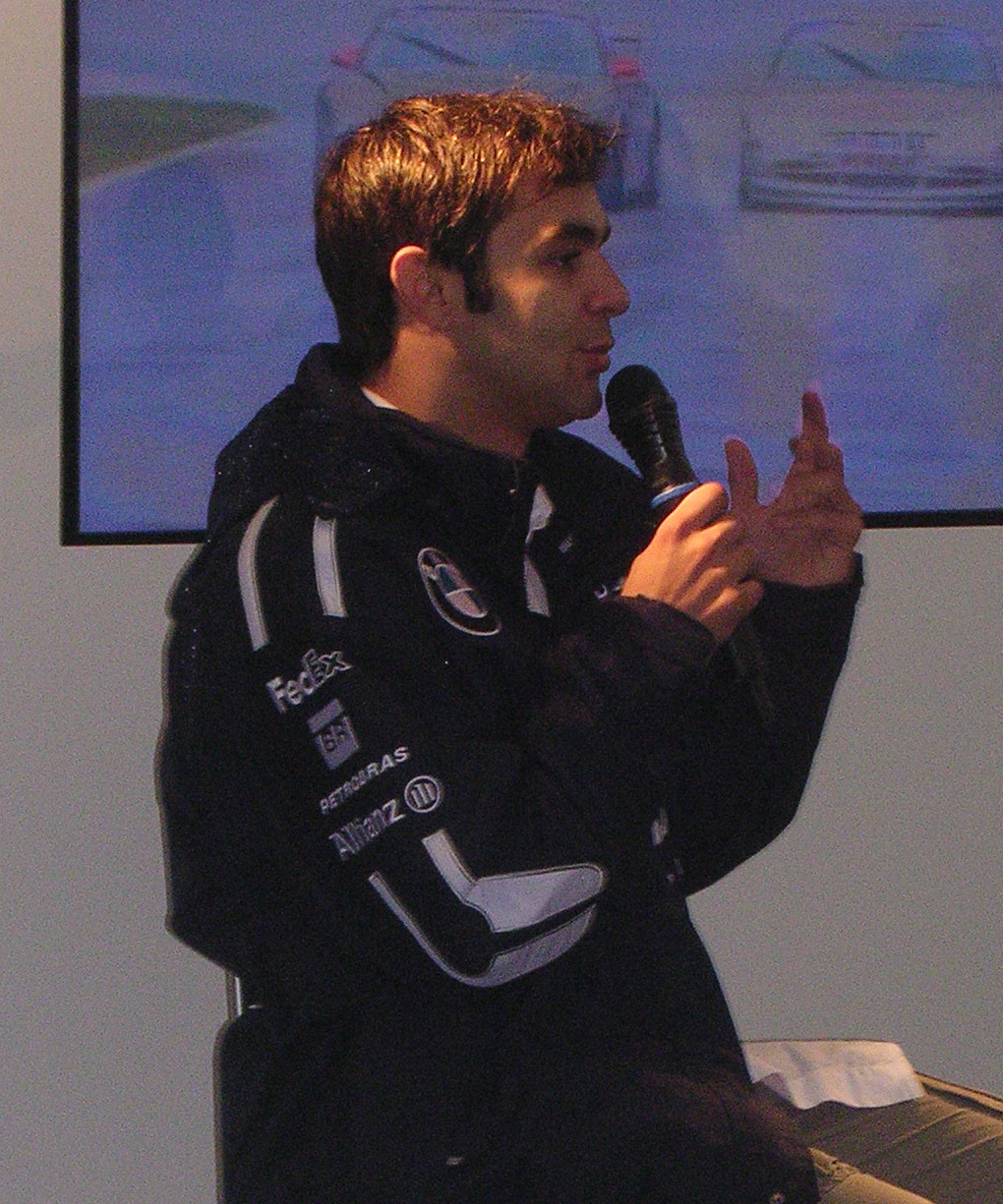
2000 champion, Antônio Pizzonia

The 2000 Green Flag British Formula 3 Championship was the 50th British Formula Three Championship season. It commenced on 26 March at Thruxton, and ended on 8 October at Silverstone after fourteen races.

Brazilian driver Antônio Pizzonia won the title after winning five races and achieved a total of eleven podiums during the season. These results allowed Pizzonia to finish 39 points ahead of Stewart Racing's Tomas Scheckter, who beat Carlin Motorsport's driver Takuma Sato by 32 points.

The scoring system was 20-15-12-10-8-6-4-3-2-1 points awarded to the first ten finishers, with 1 (one) extra point added to the driver who set the fastest lap of the race. All results counted towards the driver's final tally.

== Drivers and teams ==
The following teams and drivers were competitors in the 2000 season. The Scholarship class was for older Formula Three cars, and all cars competed on Avon tyres.

Team	No	Driver	Chassis	Engine	Rounds
Championship Class
(United Kingdom) Manor Motorsport	1	(Brazil) Antônio Pizzonia	Dallara F399	Mugen-Honda	All
(United Kingdom) Manor Motorsport	2	(Argentina) Juan Manuel López	Dallara F399	Mugen-Honda	1–9
(United Kingdom) Manor Motorsport	2	(United Kingdom) Westley Barber	Dallara F399	Mugen-Honda	11–14
(United Kingdom) Stewart Racing	3	(India) Narain Karthikeyan	Dallara F399	Mugen-Honda	All
(United Kingdom) Stewart Racing	4	(South Africa) Tomas Scheckter	Dallara F399	Mugen-Honda	All
(United Kingdom) Promatecme UK	5	(United Kingdom) Matthew Davies	Dallara F399	Renault Sodemo	All
(United Kingdom) Promatecme UK	6	(United Kingdom) Andy Priaulx	Dallara F399	Renault Sodemo	All
(United Kingdom) Fortec Motorsport	7	(United Kingdom) Michael Bentwood	Dallara F399	Mugen-Honda	All
(United Kingdom) Fortec Motorsport	8	(Italy) Gianmaria Bruni	Dallara F399	Mugen-Honda	All
(United Kingdom) Carlin Motorsport	9	(Japan) Takuma Sato	Dallara F300	Mugen-Honda	All
(United Kingdom) Carlin Motorsport	10	(United Kingdom) Ben Collins	Dallara F399	Mugen-Honda	All
(United Kingdom) Carlin Motorsport	20	(United Kingdom) Rob Austin	Dallara F300	Mugen-Honda	13
(Italy) RC Motorsport	11	(Serbia and Montenegro) Miloš Pavlović	Dallara F300	Spiess-Opel	All
(Italy) RC Motorsport	12	(Denmark) Nicolas Kiesa	Dallara F300	Spiess-Opel	All
(United Kingdom) Alan Docking Racing	15	(United Kingdom) Westley Barber	Dallara F300	Mugen-Honda	1–9
(United Kingdom) Alan Docking Racing	15	(Australia) Marcos Ambrose	Dallara F300	Mugen-Honda	10–14
(United Kingdom) Alan Docking Racing	16	(Thailand) Tor Sriachavanon	Dallara F399	Mugen-Honda	All
(United Kingdom) Rowan Racing	17	(United Kingdom) Martin O'Connell	Dallara F300	Mugen-Honda	All
(United Kingdom) Rowan Racing	18	(Republic of Ireland) Warren Carway	Dallara F399	Mugen-Honda	All
(United Kingdom) Team Avanti	22	(United Kingdom) Andrew Kirkaldy	Dallara F300	Spiess-Opel	4–14
Invitation Entries
(Belgium) JB Motorsport	31	(Belgium) Val Hillebrand	Dallara F300	Spiess-Opel	13
(Belgium) JB Motorsport	32	(Belgium) Nicolas Stelandre	Dallara F300	Spiess-Opel	13
(France) ASM Elf	33	(Portugal) Tiago Monteiro	Dallara F300	Renault Sodemo	13
(France) ASM Elf	34	(France) Tristan Gommendy	Dallara F300	Renault Sodemo	13
Scholarship Class
(United Kingdom) Rowan Racing	51	(Italy) Christian Colombo	Dallara F398	Mugen-Honda	All
(United Kingdom) Hopkins Motorsport	52	(United Kingdom) Philip Hopkins	Dallara F398	Spiess-Opel	1–10, 14
(United Kingdom) Hopkins Motorsport	52	(Italy) Enzo Buscaglia	Dallara F398	Spiess-Opel	11–13
(United Kingdom) Team Parker F3	53	(United Kingdom) Julian Westwood	Dallara F398	Mugen-Honda	13–14
(United Kingdom) ME Motorsport	54	(United Kingdom) Craig Fleming	Dallara F398	Mugen-Honda	1–10
(United Kingdom) ME Motorsport	54	(United Kingdom) Rob Austin	Dallara F398	Mugen-Honda	12
(United Kingdom) ME Motorsport	54	(United Kingdom) Matthew Gilmore	Dallara F398	Mugen-Honda	14
(United Kingdom) Team Meritus	55	(Japan) Atsushi Katsumata	Dallara F398	TOM'S Toyota	All
(United Kingdom) Team Meritus	56	(Brazil) Marcel Romanio	Dallara F398	TOM'S Toyota	2–6
(United Kingdom) Team Meritus	56	(Italy) Enzo Buscaglia	Dallara F398	TOM'S Toyota	10
(United Kingdom) Fred Goddard Racing	61	(United Kingdom) Gary Paffett	Dallara F398	Renault Sodemo	All
(United Kingdom) Diamond Racing	66	(United States) Ryan Walker	Dallara F398	Mugen-Honda	All
(United Kingdom) Diamond Racing	77	(United Kingdom) Mark Mayall	Dallara F398	Mugen-Honda	All

== Results ==
Round	Circuit	Date	Pole Position	Fastest Lap	Winning Driver	Winning Team	Schorlaship Class Winner
1	(United Kingdom) Thruxton Circuit	26 March	(South Africa) Tomas Scheckter	(South Africa) Tomas Scheckter	(Brazil) Antônio Pizzonia	(United Kingdom) Manor Motorsport	(United Kingdom) Gary Paffett
2	(United Kingdom) Croft Circuit	9 April	(Denmark) Nicolas Kiesa	(South Africa) Tomas Scheckter	(Brazil) Antônio Pizzonia	(United Kingdom) Manor Motorsport	(United Kingdom) Gary Paffett
3	(United Kingdom) Oulton Park	30 April	(Brazil) Antônio Pizzonia	(Brazil) Antônio Pizzonia	(South Africa) Tomas Scheckter	(United Kingdom) Stewart Racing	(United Kingdom) Gary Paffett
4	(United Kingdom) Donington Park	7 May	(Japan) Takuma Sato	(Brazil) Antônio Pizzonia	(United Kingdom) Ben Collins	(United Kingdom) Carlin Motorsport	(United Kingdom) Gary Paffett
5	(United Kingdom) Donington Park	7 May	(South Africa) Tomas Scheckter	(Brazil) Antônio Pizzonia	(South Africa) Tomas Scheckter	(United Kingdom) Stewart Racing	(United Kingdom) Gary Paffett
6	(United Kingdom) Silverstone International	21 May	(Japan) Takuma Sato	(Brazil) Antônio Pizzonia	(Japan) Takuma Sato	(United Kingdom) Carlin Motorsport	(United Kingdom) Gary Paffett
7	(United Kingdom) Brands Hatch Indy	4 June	(United Kingdom) Ben Collins	(Brazil) Antônio Pizzonia	(Brazil) Antônio Pizzonia	(United Kingdom) Manor Motorsport	(United Kingdom) Gary Paffett
8	(United Kingdom) Donington Park GP	2 July	(Brazil) Antônio Pizzonia	(Italy) Gianmaria Bruni	(Brazil) Antônio Pizzonia	(United Kingdom) Manor Motorsport	(United Kingdom) Gary Paffett
9	(United Kingdom) Donington Park GP	2 July	(Denmark) Nicolas Kiesa	(Denmark) Nicolas Kiesa	(Denmark) Nicolas Kiesa	(Italy) RC Motorsport	(United Kingdom) Gary Paffett
10	(United Kingdom) Croft Circuit	23 July	(Japan) Takuma Sato	(Japan) Takuma Sato	(Japan) Takuma Sato	(United Kingdom) Carlin Motorsport	(United Kingdom) Gary Paffett
11	(United Kingdom) Silverstone GP	20 August	(Japan) Takuma Sato	(Japan) Takuma Sato	(Japan) Takuma Sato	(United Kingdom) Carlin Motorsport	(United Kingdom) Gary Paffett
12	(United Kingdom) Snetterton Motor Racing Circuit	3 September	(Brazil) Antônio Pizzonia	(South Africa) Tomas Scheckter	(Brazil) Antônio Pizzonia	(United Kingdom) Manor Motorsport	(Japan) Atsushi Katsumata
13	(Belgium) Circuit de Spa-Francorchamps	24 September	(Japan) Takuma Sato	(Japan) Takuma Sato	(Portugal) Tiago Monteiro	(France) ASM Elf	(Japan) Atsushi Katsumata
14	(United Kingdom) Silverstone GP	8 October	(United Kingdom) Andy Priaulx	(Japan) Takuma Sato	(Japan) Takuma Sato	(United Kingdom) Carlin Motorsport	(United Kingdom) Gary Paffett

== Standings ==
Pos	Driver	THR (United Kingdom)	CRO (United Kingdom)	OUL (United Kingdom)	DON (United Kingdom)	DON (United Kingdom)	SIL (United Kingdom)	BRH (United Kingdom)	DON (United Kingdom)	DON (United Kingdom)	CRO (United Kingdom)	SIL (United Kingdom)	SNE (United Kingdom)	SPA (Belgium)	SIL (United Kingdom)	Pts
1	(Brazil) Antônio Pizzonia	1	1	2	11	2	2	1	1	3	Ret	2	1	2	9	200
2	(South Africa) Tomas Scheckter	2	2	1	Ret	1	4	4	23	6	2	4	2	5	3	161
3	(Japan) Takuma Sato	Ret	5	Ret	Ret	9	1	2	3	9	1	1	6	21	1	129
4	(India) Narain Karthikeyan	3	Ret	5	2	8	6	3	4	10	10	5	5	3	Ret	100
5	(Italy) Gianmaria Bruni	7	4	6	7	Ret	5	8	2	4	19	3	Ret	4	5	95
6	(Denmark) Nicolas Kiesa	8	Ret	Ret	5	7	3	12	6	1	3	10	Ret	6	11	77
7	(United Kingdom) Michael Bentwood	Ret	3	7	3	5	Ret	5	7	7	9	11	4	16	7	69
8	(United Kingdom) Ben Collins	Ret	8	21	1	15	8	Ret	8	Ret	4	6	3	Ret	4	67
9	(United Kingdom) Andy Priaulx	5	9	3	9	3	Ret	Ret	9	8	21	12	8	8	2	64
10	(United Kingdom) Matthew Davies	4	Ret	4	Ret	4	DNS	9	11	19	11	7	7	7	Ret	47
11	(Serbia and Montenegro) Miloš Pavlović	6	6	9	Ret	11	DNS	6	5	5	7	Ret	Ret	15	Ret	41
12	(United Kingdom) Martin O'Connell	Ret	Ret	8	6	6	9	7	10	12	12	8	11	10	8	32
13	(United Kingdom) Andrew Kirkaldy				8	14	Ret	Ret	13	2	6	13	Ret	9	Ret	28
14	(United Kingdom) Westley Barber	10	7	12	10	12	19	11				18	10	11	6	17
15	(Australia) Marcos Ambrose										5	9	9	Ret	10	13
16	(Argentina) Juan Manuel López	12	10	10	Ret	13	7	Ret	14	Ret						6
17	(Thailand) Tor Sriachavanon	11	18	14	Ret	Ret	15	13	16	14	Ret	15	15	Ret	14	2
18	(Republic of Ireland) Warren Carway	13	Ret	17	12	17	18	14	15	13	14	Ret	12	13	13	0
	(United Kingdom) Rob Austin													Ret		0
Guest drivers ineligible for points
	(Portugal) Tiago Monteiro													1		0
	(France) Tristan Gommendy													12		0
	(Belgium) Val Hillebrand													Ret		0
	(Belgium) Nicolas Stelandre													Ret		0
Scholarship Class
1	(United Kingdom) Gary Paffett	9	11	11	4	10	10	10	12	11	8	14	14	Ret	12	268
2	(Italy) Christian Colombo	14	Ret	19	DNQ	16	12	18	17	15	13	Ret	16	Ret	15	128
3	(United States) Ryan Walker	Ret	15	15	15	20	14	16	18	17	15	Ret	17	19	17	122
4	(Japan) Atsushi Katsumata	15	12	Ret	Ret	23	11	Ret	21	Ret	16	Ret	13	14	19	108
5	(United Kingdom) Mark Mayall	Ret	17	16	Ret	22	16	17	22	20	Ret	16	18	17	Ret	88
6	(United Kingdom) Philip Hopkins	16	14	20	14	21	17	DNS	19	18	17				20	76
7	(United Kingdom) Craig Fleming	Ret	13	18	16	19	DNS	15	20	16	Ret					73
8	(Brazil) Marcel Romanio		16	13	13	18	13									58
9	(United Kingdom) Peter Nilsson											17	19	Ret	16	30
10	(Italy) Enzo Buscaglia										20	19	DNS	20		22
11	(United Kingdom) Julian Westwood													18	18	20
12	(United Kingdom) Matthew Gilmore														21	3
	(United Kingdom) Rob Austin												Ret			0
Pos	Driver	THR (United Kingdom)	CRO (United Kingdom)	OUL (United Kingdom)	DON (United Kingdom)	DON (United Kingdom)	SIL (United Kingdom)	BRH (United Kingdom)	DON (United Kingdom)	DON (United Kingdom)	CRO (United Kingdom)	SIL (United Kingdom)	SNE (United Kingdom)	SPA (Belgium)	SIL (United Kingdom)	Pts

Colour	Result
Gold	Winner
Silver	Second place
Bronze	Third place
Green	Points classification
Blue	Non-points classification
Blue	Non-classified finish (NC)
Purple	Retired, not classified (Ret)
Red	Did not qualify (DNQ)
Red	Did not pre-qualify (DNPQ)
Black	Disqualified (DSQ)
White	Did not start (DNS)
White	Withdrew (WD)
White	Race cancelled (C)
Blank	Did not practice (DNP)
Blank	Did not arrive (DNA)
Blank	Excluded (EX)
