= 2003 Hungarian Grand Prix =

Coordinates: 47°34′56″N 19°14′59″E

Race 13 of 16 in the 2003 Formula One World Championship
← Previous race	Next race →
- The Hungaroring after being modified in 2003.

Race details
- Date: 24 August 2003
- Official name: Marlboro Magyar Nagydíj 2003
- Location: Hungaroring, Mogyoród, Pest, Hungary
- Course: Permanent racing facility
- Course length: 4.381 km (2.722 miles)
- Distance: 70 laps, 306.663 km (190.552 miles)
- Weather: Warm, dry and sunny, 28 °C (82 °F)

Pole position
Driver	(Spain) Fernando Alonso	Renault
- Time: 1:21.688

Fastest lap
Driver	(Colombia) Juan Pablo Montoya	Williams-BMW
- Time: 1:22.095 on lap 37

Podium
First	(Spain) Fernando Alonso	Renault
Second	(Finland) Kimi Räikkönen	McLaren-Mercedes
Third	(Colombia) Juan Pablo Montoya	Williams-BMW

The 2003 Hungarian Grand Prix (formally the Marlboro Magyar Nagydíj 2003) was a Formula One motor race held on 24 August 2003 at the Hungaroring, Mogyoród, Pest, Hungary. It was the 13th round of 16 of the 2003 Formula One World Championship and the 18th Hungarian Grand Prix as part of the Formula One World Championship. Renault's Fernando Alonso won the 70-lap race from pole position. McLaren's Kimi Räikkönen was second with Williams's Juan Pablo Montoya third.

It was the first race run on the newly renovated Hungaroring, with the main straight expanded and the first hairpin tightened, as well as additional changes near the end of the lap to encourage more overtaking. Going into the race, Ferrari's Michael Schumacher led the World Drivers' Championship from Montoya and Ferrari led Williams in the World Constructors' Championship. Alonso secured pole position by setting the quickest qualifying lap time in the second qualifying session. He led all but one lap of the race to win his first Grand Prix, becoming the first Spanish driver to do so, and breaking Bruce McLaren's 43-year record as the youngest Formula One Grand Prix winner. Räikkönen was 16.7 seconds behind in second place while Montoya completed the podium positions in third.

Michael Schumacher finished a lap behind in eighth, reducing his World Drivers' Championship lead to one championship point over Montoya, while Räikkönen's second-place finish brought him within two points of Schumacher. Williams assumed the World Constructors' Championship from Ferrari for the first time this season, with an eight-point lead with three races remaining in the season.

== Background ==
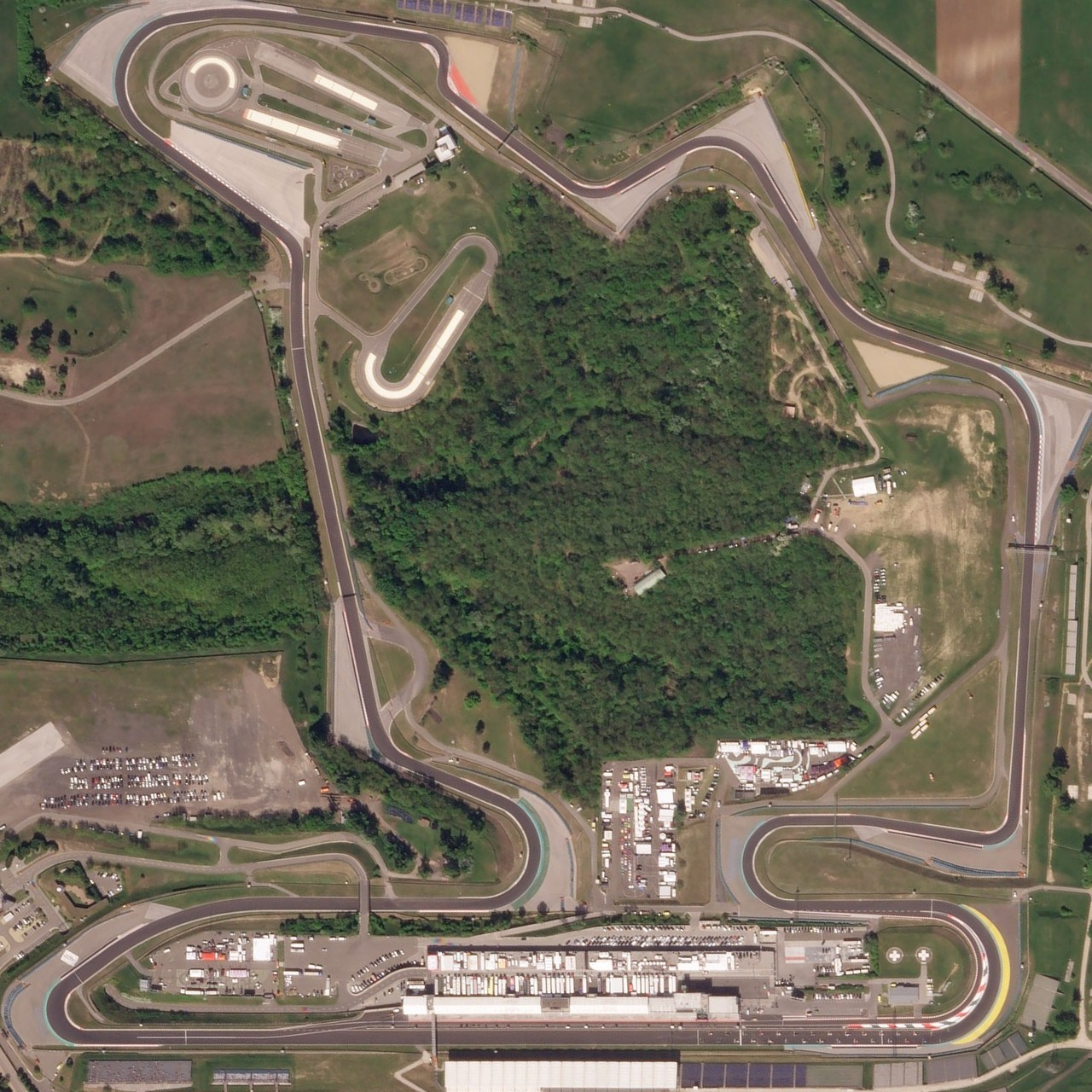
The Hungaroring (pictured in 2018), where the race was held

The 2003 Hungarian Grand Prix was the 13th of 16 races of the 2003 Formula One World Championship and the 18th edition of the event since its first Formula One race in 1986. It took place over 70 laps at the 14-turn, 4.381 km (2.722 mi) Hungaroring in Mogyoród, Pest, Hungary on 24 August. Going into the race, Ferrari driver Michael Schumacher led the World Drivers' Championship with 71 championship points, six more than the second-placed Juan Pablo Montoya of Williams and nine ahead of McLaren's Kimi Räikkönen. Montoya's teammate Ralf Schumacher was fourth with 53 championship points, four more than Ferrari's Rubens Barrichello. Ferrari on 120 championship points led Williams by two championship points in the World Constructors' Championship. McLaren were third with 103 championship points, with Renault fourth with 66 championship points.

The first 12 races were won by seven different drivers, with Michael Schumacher the only one to win more than twice. Renault's Fernando Alonso, who had achieved three podium results over the course of the season thus far, thought the Hungaroring's high-downforce nature and the Hungarian heat should play to the advantage of the Michelin tyres on the Renault R23, adding, "There's so many corners which means there is a bigger margin for the driver to make a difference. I think we can have a good weekend." Montoya had won the preceding German Grand Prix and had six consecutive podium finishes, but his performance in Hungary was subpar. He was the bookmakers' favourite to win the race, and was certain that his car would be better suited to the circuit after being improved.

Following the 2002 Grand Prix, the Hungaroring track was modified to try and encourage more overtaking and make it easier to do so in various areas beginning in 2003. The Fédération Internationale de l'Automobile (FIA; Formula One's governing body), Formula One Management, the National Automobile Sport Federation of Hungary agreed the track length increase from 3.971 km (2.467 mi) to 4.381 km (2.722 mi). The start/finish straight was lengthened by 202 m (663 ft) and turn one was made into a 145-degree corner. The turn 11 chicane was removed, leaving a longer straight from turn 10 to a new 90-degree turn with an outside tarmac run-off area. The circuit then rejoined the existing layout following a short straight. The changes, which increased lap times by more than six seconds, received a mixed reception. Willy Rampf, Sauber's technical director, believed the chances of overtaking had increased, but that most passes would still occur during pit stop windows. Alonso thought turn one would still see the most overtakes while Toyota's Olivier Panis did not believe the revised track configuration would effect on racing setups or its character as a low-speed, high-downforce circuit.

The event included ten constructors, each with two race drivers. Zsolt Baumgartner (for the second time with Jordan), Gianmaria Bruni (Minardi) and Allan McNish (Renault) were the three drivers who drove a third car in only the Friday private test session. Tyre suppliers Bridgestone and Michelin brought a new soft compound to the race. The teams focused primarily on creating solutions that would allow them to achieve the maximum possible aerodynamic load and effective heat dissipation, which was hampered by both the high ambient temperatures and the Hungaroring's tight turns. Multiple teams proposed solutions already used in the Monaco Grand Prix and chimneys that were even more evident than those mounted in Malaysia. McLaren reverted to the MP4-17D's original front suspension while Sauber adopted a redesigned engine cover with a distinctive triangular fin at the end of the roll-bar, a solution previously tested by Williams.

== Private test session ==
Teams that opted for limited testing during the season were given a two-hour test session on Friday morning. It was dry and sunny for the test session, however numerous drivers ran wide due to dusty conditions for most of the session. Renault took the first three places with Alonso fastest at 1:22.230, with McNish second and Jarno Trulli third. Jaguar's Mark Webber and Justin Wilson were fourth and fifth. Giancarlo Fisichella stopped at the exit of turn one due to an engine failure billowing smoke from the rear of his car. Fisichella returned to the circuit with ten minutes remaining but set one timed lap due to a rear wheel lock. Nicolas Kiesa's engine failed with eight minutes left. Webber's engine stalled at the pit lane exit and was pushed to the garage for repairs.

== Practice and warm-up sessions ==
There were three practice sessions preceding Sunday's race: one 60-minute session on Friday and two 45-minute sessions on Saturday. The first session on Friday morning took place in dry and sunny conditions. Panis lapped fastest with a time of 1:21.770 set five minutes before the session concluded, 0.694 seconds ahead of second-placed Trulli. Montoya, Barrichello, Montoya, Toyota's Cristiano da Matta, Webber, Ralf Schumacher, McLaren's David Coulthard, Michael Schumacher and Alonso were in positions three to ten. Several drivers encountered spins and offs during the session due to the circuit's thick dust and dirt. With 15 minutes remaining, Michael Schumacher spun through 360 degrees at turn nine, forcing Panis to brake hard at the exit. Wilson sustained gearbox cooling system damage, spilling fluid onto the back wheels, while Kiesa did not participate in the practice because Minardi mechanics were rebuilding the engine after it failed during testing.

During the second practice session, which took place in hot weather conditions, Alonso was fastest with a 1:22.950 lap he set in the session's closing moments, 0.324 seconds faster than Michael Schumacher. Barrichello, Ralf Schumacher, Trulli, Panis, Webber and Sauber's Heinz-Harald Frentzen and Nick Heidfeld completed the top ten. The dirty circuit caught out multiple drivers who moved off from the racing line for the second session.

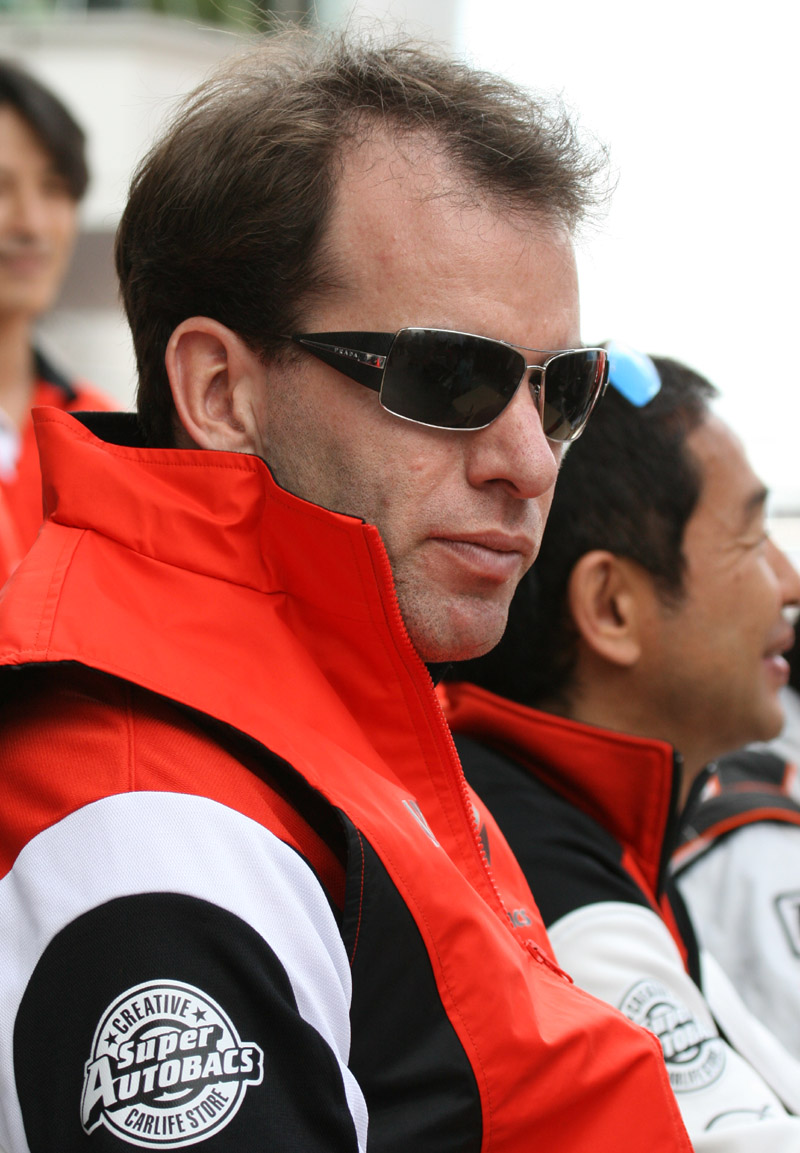
Ralph Firman (pictured in 2003) was withdrawn from the race after a heavy accident during the second practice session.

Ralph Firman's Jordan car's rear wing dislodged from a support failure on the straight heading to the left-hand turn five and went airborne, removing downforce from the car. As Firman entered the corner, his car snapped right, went backwards across the grass verge at the side of the gravel trap, losing little speed, and struck the tyre barrier sideways, showering photographers behind the barrier with debris. The collision's force, measured at 46G, bent the crash barrier out of shape and knocked Firman unconscious. Practice was stopped for 28 minutes, as Firman was transported to the circuit's medical centre and then to Orszagos Traumatologiai Intezet at Sebeszeti Osztaly for tests, observations and X-rays. Firman sustained a mild concussion, a bruised ankle and a left heel fracture. Baumgartner replaced him for the remainder of the event after the Formula One Commission's permanent bureau and stewards approved a request from Jordan for the driver change, waiving the 14-day super-licence application rule because he completed more than 300 km (190 mi) in testing. Race director Charlie Whiting investigated the accident scene as the rear wing and car were removed from the area. Jordan investigated the accident and decided to prevent Fisichella from continuing in the session as a precaution.

Ralf Schumacher led the final practice session with a 1:21.939 lap, the second sub-1:22 lap of the weekend. His brother Michael Schumacher was 0.374 seconds slower in second. Barrichello, Montoya, Webber, Räikkönen, the Renault duo of Alonso and Trulli, Coulthard and Panis followed in the top ten. Räikkönen's engine failed with smoke billowing from the rear, ending his session five minutes early. Da Matta ran wide and spun on the dusty circuit into the turn nine gravel trap; this was caused by excess oversteer and he missed the session's closing ten minutes. Kiesa avoided the gravel after losing control on the dirt, however teammate Jos Verstappen's cracked rear wing forced him to end his session early. A 15-minute warm-up session held in dry and sunny weather saw Michael Schumacher lap fastest with a 1:22.210 time, ahead of Alonso, Montoya, Webber, Ralf Schumacher, Trulli, Barrichello, Coulthard and Heidfeld.

== Qualifying ==
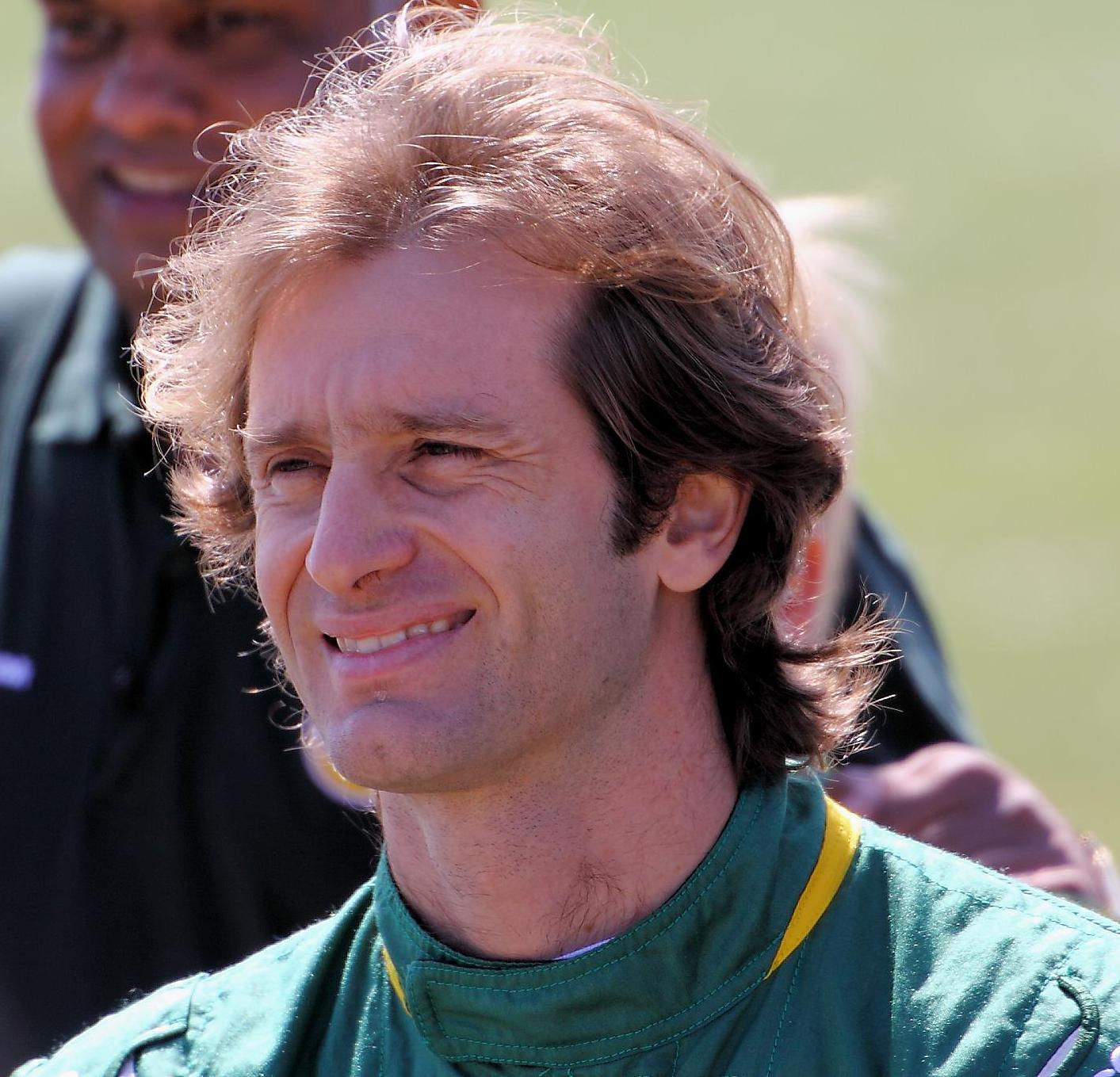
Jarno Trulli (pictured in 2011) set the fastest lap time in the first qualifying session.

There were two one-hour qualifying sessions on both Friday and Saturday afternoons. The World Drivers' Championship standings determined the running order for the first session (first to last), with the second session's running order reversed from the results of the first session (slowest to quickest). In each session, each driver recorded one timed lap with no other cars on track, and the starting order was set by the quickest laps in the second session. The session was held in hot and dry conditions, with the track starting dirty and dusty. Seven of the nine fastest drivers used Michelin tyres. Although unhappy with his car's balance, Trulli set the fastest final sector time, and took provisional pole position with a 1:22.358 lap. Trulli beat his previous best first qualifying result of second at the Spanish Grand Prix. Ralf Schumacher was second and was fastest until Trulli's lap, after modifying the racing setup during practice. Webber drove the spare Jaguar and was the tenth driver to set a lap; he was fastest in the second sector but lost time in the final part of the track, taking third. Coulthard, fourth, was reluctant entering the first corner after grip was added to the circuit but improved in the final sector. Barrichello was the faster Ferrari driver in fifth; he expressed surprise at how the handling changed between practice and qualifying. Alonso was slow at first but a quick final sector put him sixth. Panis was seventh due to his car's grip levels. Montoya drove an imbalanced car and braked early at the first corner, finishing eighth. Michael Schumacher was the first driver sent onto the track as he was leading the championship. He said he was disadvantaged running first since the support race took place between practice and qualifying, and made an error in the last sector that left him ninth. Heidfeld was tenth after losing six-tenths of a second when he ran wide onto some dust at turn three. His teammate Frentzen in 11th lost 1.3 seconds over most of the lap due to tyre graining that stopped him from attacking. Räikkönen was fastest in the first two sectors but ran wide at turn 11 and improved track conditions for other drivers put him 12th. British American Racing's (BAR) Jenson Button had his traction control system changed before qualifying, resulting in little rear grip and excess oversteer. Button slid wide at turn one and took 13th. His teammate, Jacques Villeneuve, was 14th after losing grip for much of the lap due to unable to maintain tyre life. Wilson lost control of the rear of his Jaguar through turn 13 and was 15th. Fisichella used the spare Jordan car to claim 16th. Firman, his teammate, acknowledged to being cautious because he was unfamiliar with the track and took 17th. Verstappen in 18th lost approximately six-tenths of a second in turn one. Verstappen's teammate, Kiesa, drove the spare Minardi and was 19th after losing a lot of time in sector two. Da Matta was slowest, losing half a minute after spinning at turn 13 owing to a probable traction control system fault.

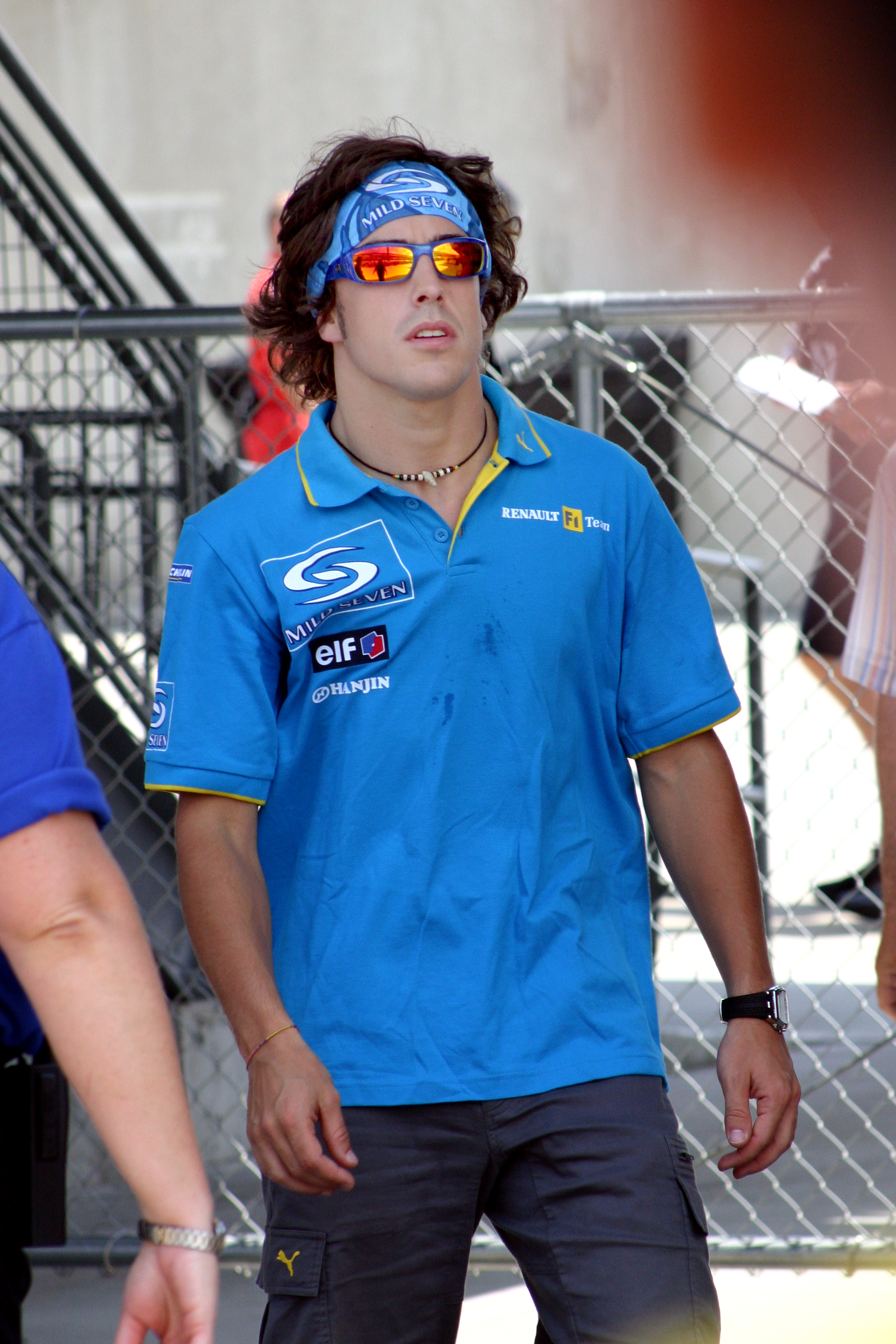
Fernando Alonso (pictured in 2004) secured the second pole position of his career and went on to become Formula One's youngest Grand Prix winner the following day.

The second qualifying session was held in hot and sunny conditions, and track conditions improved, benefiting drivers who were sent out later in the sessions. Despite a slower first sector, Alonso took advantage of the track conditions to secure his second pole position of the season and career, with a lap time of 1:21.688. Ralf Schumacher was the second to last driver to record a lap; he was faster in the first sector, but lost time in the last two, being 0.265 seconds slower in the second. Webber took third, equalling his best qualifying career result, after running wide and putting a rear wheel on the grass. Montoya, fourth, was conservative after being quick in sector one and paced himself to set a fast lap. Barrichello was the highest-placed Bridgestone runner and Ferrari driver, after had a minor understeer at the end of his lap and lost time to qualify fifth. Montoya and Barrichello set identical lap times, however Montoya began ahead of Barrichello since his lap came first. Trulli had developed a significant amount of oversteer midway through his lap, costing him time and leaving him in sixth. Räikkönen took seventh losing time due to a minor error at turn 12. Oversteer meant Michael Schumacher lacked grip at the front of his Ferrari and small errors left him eighth, his worst starting position since he began from ninth at the 1998 German Grand Prix. Coulthard, ninth, stalled twice in the pit lane, and was quicker than Alonso in the first sector but ran wide at the slippery turn five, losing four-tenths of a second to his teammate Räikkönen. Panis was 10th. Heidfeld made an error in turn 12 for 11th. Wilson adjusted the mechanical setup before qualifying and took 12th, despite losing time at turn 11. Fisichella ran a fast lap for 13th. Button pushed hard, oversteered when he applied the throttle too early in turn one and lost time at turn 11, claiming 14th. Da Matta, 15th, decided to drive cautiously due to multiple spins and an oversteer. Villeneuve could not get the front tyres to operate until the end of his 16th lap. Frentzen, who had a heavier fuel load than teammate Heidfeld after opting for a two-stop strategy, had oversteer and lost time due to a slide in turn two to qualify 17th. Verstappen qualified in 18th. In his maiden Formula One race, Baumgartner started from 19th and was the first driver to set a lap. He lost a second saving fuel. Kiesa had excess understeer and rear instability due to a chassis setup fault. He lost a large amount of time running wide at turn nine and was 20th and last.

=== Qualifying classification ===
Pos	No.	Driver	Constructor	Q1 Time	Q2 Time	Gap	Grid
1	8	(Spain) Fernando Alonso	Renault	1:22.953	1:21.688	—	1
2	4	(Germany) Ralf Schumacher	Williams-BMW	1:22.413	1:21.944	+0.256	2
3	14	(Australia) Mark Webber	Jaguar-Cosworth	1:22.625	1:22.027	+0.339	3
4	3	(Colombia) Juan Pablo Montoya	Williams-BMW	1:23.305	1:22.180	+0.492	4
5	2	(Brazil) Rubens Barrichello	Ferrari	1:22.892	1:22.180	+0.492	5
6	7	(Italy) Jarno Trulli	Renault	1:22.358	1:22.610	+0.922	6
7	6	(Finland) Kimi Räikkönen	McLaren-Mercedes	1:23.695	1:22.742	+1.054	7
8	1	(Germany) Michael Schumacher	Ferrari	1:23.430	1:22.755	+1.067	8
9	5	(United Kingdom) David Coulthard	McLaren-Mercedes	1:22.786	1:23.060	+1.372	9
10	20	(France) Olivier Panis	Toyota	1:22.986	1:23.369	+1.681	10
11	9	(Germany) Nick Heidfeld	Sauber-Petronas	1:23.482	1:23.621	+1.933	11
12	15	(United Kingdom) Justin Wilson	Jaguar-Cosworth	1:24.343	1:23.660	+1.972	12
13	11	(Italy) Giancarlo Fisichella	Jordan-Ford	1:24.725	1:23.726	+2.038	13
14	17	(United Kingdom) Jenson Button	BAR-Honda	1:24.313	1:23.847	+2.159	14
15	21	(Brazil) Cristiano da Matta	Toyota	1:55.138	1:23.982	+2.294	15
16	16	(Canada) Jacques Villeneuve	BAR-Honda	1:24.333	1:24.100	+2.412	16
17	10	(Germany) Heinz-Harald Frentzen	Sauber-Petronas	1:23.660	1:24.569	+2.881	17
18	19	(Netherlands) Jos Verstappen	Minardi-Cosworth	1:26.052	1:26.423	+4.735	18
19	12	(Hungary) Zsolt Baumgartner	Jordan-Ford	No time^{1}	1:26.678	+4.990	19
20	18	(Denmark) Nicolas Kiesa	Minardi-Cosworth	1:27.023	1:28.907	+7.219	20

Note

- ^1 – Zsolt Baumgartner did not set a time in the first qualifying session because he had little time to prepare for the second session after learning that Ralph Firman would not be driving due to a heavy accident.

== Race ==
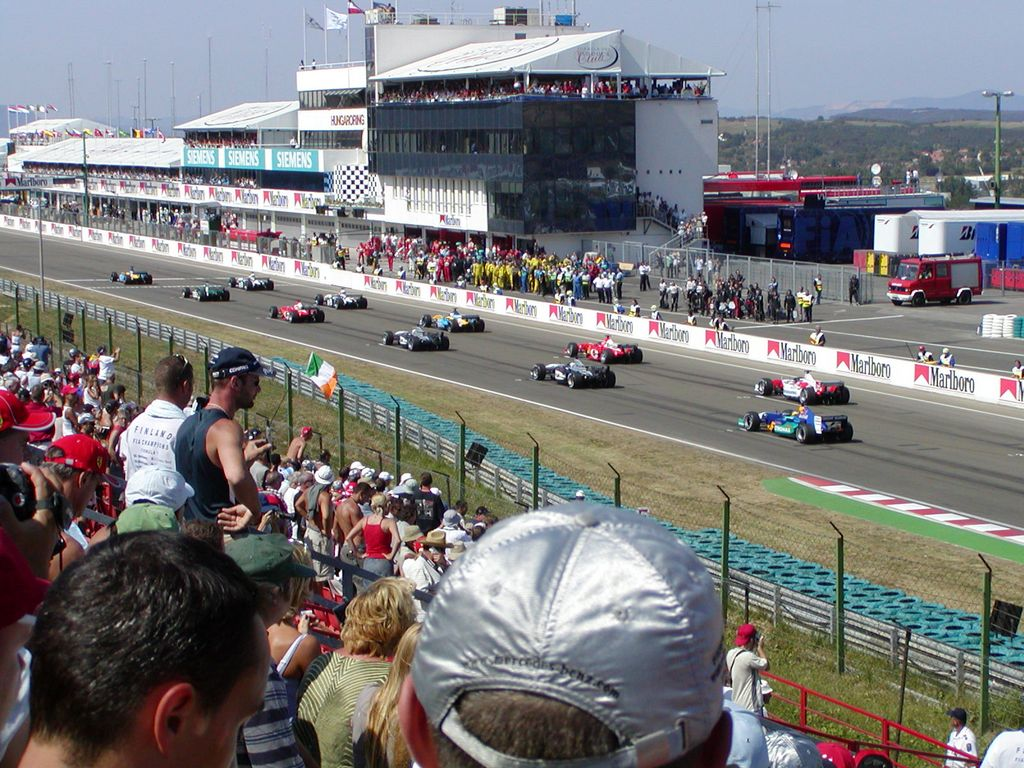
The start of the race

The 70-lap race began at 14:00 local time. It was dry and sunny before the race with the air temperature between 34 and 36 °C (93 and 97 °F) and the track temperature was between 47 and 52 °C (117 and 126 °F). When the race began, Alonso made a quick getaway on the clean side of the track, leading the pack into the first corner with his Renault's powerful launch control system. Drivers starting in even-numbered places were at a disadvantage because the track was quite dirty and they could not find any grip due to a lack of traction. The Williams duo, Ralf Schumacher and Montoya, were on the dirty side of the track and struggled to get away, dropping to eighth and ninth by the first corner. Going into the left-hand turn two, Ralf Schumacher lost control of his car in front of the midfield runners after outbraking himself. He spun around and fell to 19th. Yellow flags were waved, when Da Matta stalled on the grid and was pushed into the pit lane, where his Toyota was restarted. At the end of lap one, as the track surface resulted in a mixed-up field, Alonso led Webber by 1.96 seconds, followed by Barrichello, Räikkönen (having moved from seventh), Trulli, Coulthard, Michael Schumacher and Montoya.

Alonso began to pull away from the rest of the field because of his pace advantage over second-placed Webber, who was holding up the field and put under pressure by Barrichello. On lap two, Ralf Schumacher and Button overtook Baumgartner, who ran onto the turn 11 gravel trap but continued in 19th. Barrichello attempted to pass Webber by braking later into the turn six chicane for second on the next lap. Instead, he missed the turn-in and continued straight on, forcing him to give up second to Webber in order to avoid a penalty for gaining an unfair advantage. By doing so, he slowed down so much and allowed Räikkönen and Trulli through, dropping from third to fifth. There were overtakes further down the field. Ralf Schumacher passed Frentzen and Panis and Kiesa was overtaken by Baumgartner. Fisichella ran wide at the final corner and lost three positions to Wilson, Panis and Ralf Schumacher. On lap six, Ralf Schumacher overtook Panis for 12th at turn one and passed Wilson at the same turn three laps later. Button passed Frentzen at turn one for 16th on lap ten. On the 11th lap, Ralf Schumacher returned to the top ten when he overtook Villeneuve for 10th as Button passed Verstappen for 15th.

The first round of pit stops began on lap 12. Alonso set a streak of fastest laps to lead Webber by 21 seconds as he made his first pit stop for fuel and tyres at the end of lap 13. His stop took 6.4 seconds to complete and dropped to second, behind Räikkönen. Webber made his first stop on the same lap and fell to 12th. Two laps later, Villeneuve's hydraulic system failed owing to a lack of pressure while attempting to rejoin the track, forcing him to retire. Räikkönen entered the pit lane on lap 15, moving Alonso back to the lead. His pit stop sparked a series of refuelling stops among the top ten, including the two Williams and Ferrari drivers. Ralf Schumacher overtook Heidfeld at turn one for seventh on lap 15. Coulthard was the final driver to make a pit stop for fuel on lap 18. After the pit stops, Alonso led from Räikkönen, Webber, Trulli, Barrichello, Montoya, Michael Schumacher and Coulthard. On lap 20, Barrichello's left-rear suspension failed when braking for turn one at the end of the start/finish straight owing to a broken left rear top wishbone, which removed the whole suspension from the Ferrari. His left-rear wheel detached and with no steering went straight across the tarmac run-off area and into the turn one tyre barrier. Although the incident caused minimal back pain, Barrichello was unhurt. Consequently, the safety car was not deployed by the race stewards and Whiting to help clear most of the debris at the side of the circuit.

Barrichello's accident moved Montoya to fifth and Michael Schumacher to sixth. Ralf Schumacher passed Coulthard for seventh on the same lap. Trulli, fourth, was put under pressure by both Montoya and Michael Schumacher, with Ralf Schumacher gaining on them. On lap 26, Da Matta caught and overtook Kiesa at turn one for 17th. Three laps later, Fisichella retired at turn three with an engine failure. On lap 30, Ralf Schumacher approached his brother Michael Schumacher, who was careful into turn one, and overtook him on the inside for sixth. The second round of pit stops commenced on the same lap. Alonso made his second pit stop, and his lead was so large that he retained the lead. Webber made his second pit stop on lap 31 and fell from third to ninth. Trulli stopped on lap 32, moving Montoya, Ralf Schumacher ahead of him and into clear air so that there would be no impedance from Trulli in the race's second half. Räikkönen fell behind both Williams drivers to fourth after his second stop on lap 33. On lap 34, Panis retired after completing his second pit stop due to a gearbox fault. That lap also saw Ralf Schumacher make a pit stop and emerge ahead of Trulli but behind Webber.

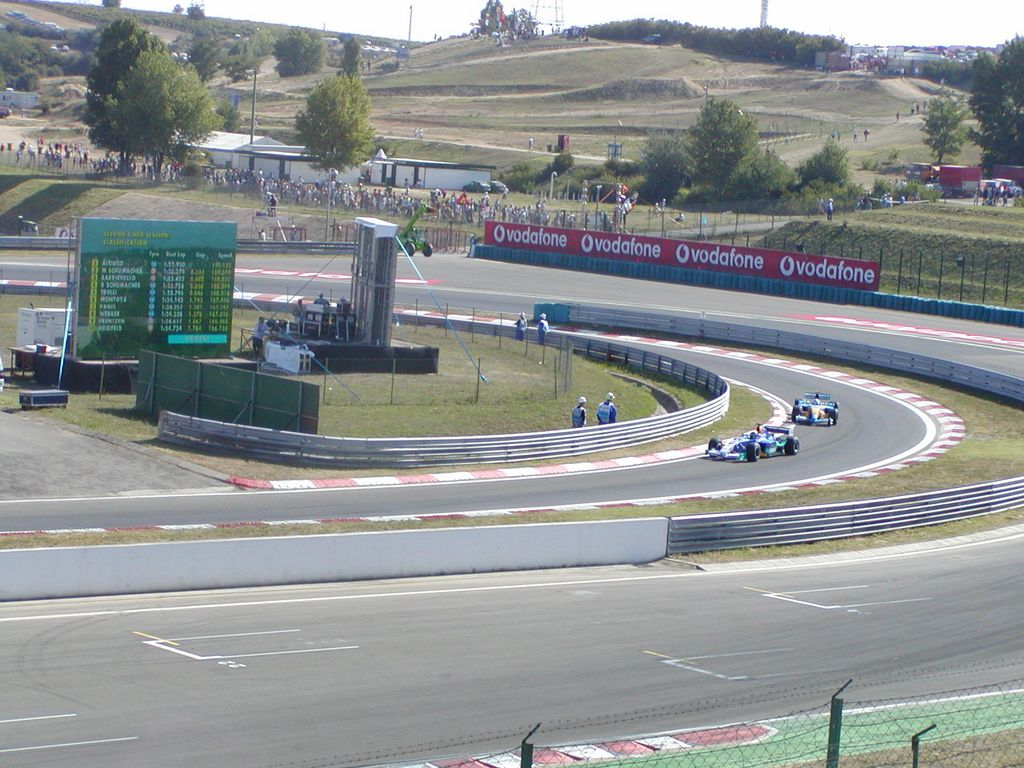
A Sauber and Renault car entering the pit lane.

Montoya set the race's fastest lap on the next lap and made his second pit stop at the conclusion of lap 35. He rejoined in fifth, ahead of Webber and Ralf Schumacher and with a clear track in front of him, became the fastest driver on the circuit. That same lap, Baumgartner's engine failed, ending his race. On lap 39, Michael Schumacher made his second pit stop, rejoining in eighth close behind Trulli, while Webber attempted to hold off Ralf Schumacher. Coulthard in third on a two-stop strategy that was converted from a three-stop strategy early in the race was the last to pit on lap 43. He rejoined between Trulli and Michael Schumacher. That lap saw Wilson retire with an engine failure. Ralf Schumacher passed Webber at turn one for fourth on lap 46, and began to pull away from him. Frentzen pulled over to the side of the track on lap 48 as his car ran out of fuel after failing to enter the pit lane owing to a radio communication failure. The third round of pit stops began on lap 49 when Alonso made his third and final pit stop. The sequence saw no change in the order, aside from Coulthard who moved up to fifth behind Ralf Schumacher as a result of not having to pit. Montoya spun backwards on lap 62, but he managed to keep the engine running and the car out of the gravel trap. He stayed in third but his teammate Ralf Schumacher closed up to him.

At the front, Alonso maintained the lead he had held for all but one lap for the remainder of the race, winning his first of 32 Formula One races and became the first Spanish driver to win a Formula One Grand Prix. At 22 years and 26 days, he became the youngest Formula One Grand Prix winner, beating Bruce McLaren's record set at the 1959 United States Grand Prix at Sebring International Raceway, Florida by 78 days. (Note: Troy Ruttman won the 1952 Indianapolis 500 at 22 years and 80 days when the race formed part of the World Championship.) Alonso was the eighth different race winner in the 13 races held thus far in the season, and it was his only victory in Hungary. Räikkönen finished second for the fifth time in 2003, 16.7 seconds behind. Montoya completed the podium positions by finishing third. His teammate Ralf Schumacher chased Montoya in the closing laps and was just more than a second behind in fourth. Coulthard's two-stop strategy allowed him to finish in fifth. Webber took sixth place for Jaguar. Trulli finished seventh, complaining that his tyres lost grip at the start of each stint. Michael Schumacher finished eighth, one lap behind, for his worst season performance. His attempt to gain position came to an end when he stalled in the pit lane after running out of fuel on his second pit stop. Heidfeld finished ninth after being held off by Michael Schumacher in the final laps. Button recovered from a sub-par first lap to finish 10th with Da Matta 11th. Verstappen and Kiesa of Minardi were the final classified finishers, with no technical issues or serious incidents.

=== Post-race ===
The post-race podium ceremony

The top three drivers appeared on the podium to collect their trophies and spoke to the media in the subsequent press conference. Alonso described the win as "..a dream comes true. I'm 22 years old and I have my first victory in my pocket so I hope I can have a long career in Formula One with more victories." He described his Renault as "perfect for the race" and said his next objective was to "fight for the World Championship like these guys as soon as possible." Räikkönen was happy to finish second since it allowed him to cut the gap to Michael Schumacher in the World Drivers' Championship, "it's more closer, anything can happen in the race and hopefully we can improve the car and be quick in the next race also." Montoya believed a good start would have allowed him to challenge Alonso, but he was dubious whether he would have won. He also believed his poor start was due to his being on the dirty side of the track, and disclosed that he informed Whiting about the difficulties as the previous year's race had a Sunday warm-up session in which drivers began on the dirt to clean the circuit.

Alonso's father Luis described his son's win as "a great moment and the repercussions in Spain will be bigger than anything" and "I'm delighted but it wasn't an agonising race to watch because he wasn't under pressure." Adrian Campos, Alonso's manager, described him as "the perfect machine for this job. He has no flaws and everything about his character works in his favour for being a racing driver." McNish heralded Alonso's performance as "absolutely dazzling but I never expected anything less from him after he grabbed pole position." After finishing fourth, Ralf Schumacher said his chances of winning the World Drivers' Championship were "pretty distant", adding, "A lot would have to happen and I'd have to have a lot of luck. I'll try my hardest and we'll have to see what happens." Coulthard said fifth was "a reasonable outcome" for himself and added that moving to a two-stop strategy was the right decision considering his starting position of ninth. Webber commented on his sixth-place finish, "I really enjoyed that race, but it was hard -- hard on the car, hard on the tyres and hard on the driver, but what a reward at the end of it. We didn't expect to be that strong in the race, to be honest, and I just really, really enjoyed myself out there."

Jean Todt, the Ferrari team's manager, referred to their performance as "disappointing". Former world champion Niki Lauda described Ferrari's performance in Hungary as "a disaster race" and that it was "impressive how they (Ferrari) have gone backwards. Now they are so bad it's unbelievable. They have been dominating the last three years, nobody could get near them and now they get lapped". Michael Schumacher characterised it as "not a great race for me", having been unable to run at his fastest pace due to being impeded by another car. Ferrari determined that Barrichello's suspension probably failed by his mounting the kerbs at an "unusual angle" when near the car ahead of him between turns five and six. Barrichello said he was unhappy that did not receive medical attention after the accident. He criticised the tarmac run-off area at turn one as too small for safety, "Somebody had a chance to create a new design: by creating a new design just make it a little bit shorter and give us the run-off." The Italian press were critical of Ferrari's performance in the Grand Prix.

Michael Schumacher's eighth-place finish, combined with podiums for Montoya and Räikkönen, meant that the top three were separated by two championship points going into the season's last three races. Alonso's maiden win promoted him to fifth with 54 championship points, only four behind Ralf Schumacher. In the World Constructors' Championship, Williams claimed the top spot for the first time in the season with 129 championship points, eight ahead of Ferrari. McLaren were third, 14 championship points behind Williams.

=== Race classification ===
Drivers who scored championship points are denoted in bold.

Pos	No	Driver	Constructor	Tyre	Laps	Time/Retired	Grid	Points
1	8	(Spain) **Fernando Alonso**	**Renault**	M	70	1:39:01.460	1	10
2	6	(Finland) **Kimi Räikkönen**	**McLaren-Mercedes**	M	70	+16.768	7	8
3	3	(Colombia) **Juan Pablo Montoya**	**Williams-BMW**	M	70	+34.537	4	6
4	4	(Germany) **Ralf Schumacher**	**Williams-BMW**	M	70	+35.620	2	5
5	5	(United Kingdom) **David Coulthard**	**McLaren-Mercedes**	M	70	+56.535	9	4
6	14	(Australia) **Mark Webber**	**Jaguar-Cosworth**	M	70	+1:12.643	3	3
7	7	(Italy) **Jarno Trulli**	**Renault**	M	69	+1 Lap	6	2
8	1	(Germany) **Michael Schumacher**	**Ferrari**	B	69	+1 Lap	8	1
9	9	(Germany) Nick Heidfeld	Sauber-Petronas	B	69	+1 Lap	11	
10	17	(United Kingdom) Jenson Button	BAR-Honda	B	69	+1 Lap	14	
11	21	(Brazil) Cristiano da Matta	Toyota	M	68	+2 Laps	15	
12	19	(Netherlands) Jos Verstappen	Minardi-Cosworth	B	67	+3 Laps	18	
13	18	(Denmark) Nicolas Kiesa	Minardi-Cosworth	B	66	+4 Laps	20	
Ret	10	(Germany) Heinz-Harald Frentzen	Sauber-Petronas	B	47	Out of fuel	17	
Ret	15	(United Kingdom) Justin Wilson	Jaguar-Cosworth	M	42	Engine	12	
Ret	12	(Hungary) Zsolt Baumgartner	Jordan-Ford	B	34	Engine	19	
Ret	20	(France) Olivier Panis	Toyota	M	33	Gearbox	10	
Ret	11	(Italy) Giancarlo Fisichella	Jordan-Ford	B	28	Engine	13	
Ret	2	(Brazil) Rubens Barrichello	Ferrari	B	19	Suspension/Accident	5	
Ret	16	(Canada) Jacques Villeneuve	BAR-Honda	B	14	Hydraulics	16	

== Championship standings after the race ==
Drivers' Championship standings

+/–	Pos	Driver	Points
	1	(Germany) **Michael Schumacher***	72
	2	(Colombia) **Juan Pablo Montoya***	71
	3	(Finland) **Kimi Räikkönen***	70
	4	(Germany) **Ralf Schumacher***	58
1	5	(Spain) **Fernando Alonso***	54

Constructors' Championship standings

+/–	Pos	Constructor	Points
1	1	(United Kingdom) **Williams-BMW***	129
1	2	(Italy) **Ferrari***	121
	3	(United Kingdom) **McLaren-Mercedes***	115
	4	(France) **Renault***	78
	5	(United Kingdom) BAR-Honda	15
Sources:

- Note: Only the top five positions are included for both sets of standings.
- Competitors in bold and marked with an asterisk still had a theoretical chance of becoming World Champion.

== See also ==
- 2003 Hungaroring F3000 round

Previous race: 2003 German Grand Prix	FIA Formula One World Championship; 2003 season	Next race: 2003 Italian Grand Prix
Previous race: 2002 Hungarian Grand Prix	Hungarian Grand Prix	Next race: 2004 Hungarian Grand Prix
