= 2003 German Grand Prix =

Coordinates: 49°19′40″N 8°33′57″E

Race 12 of 16 in the 2003 Formula One World Championship
← Previous race	Next race →

Race details
- Date: 3 August 2003
- Official name: Grosser Mobil 1 Preis von Deutschland 2003
- Location: Hockenheimring, Hockenheim, Germany
- Course: Permanent racing facility
- Course length: 4.574 km (2.842 miles)
- Distance: 67 laps, 306.458 km (190.424 miles)
- Weather: Sunny and warm, Track: 50 °C (122 °F)

Pole position
Driver	(Colombia) Juan Pablo Montoya	Williams-BMW
- Time: 1:15.167

Fastest lap
Driver	(Colombia) Juan Pablo Montoya	Williams-BMW
- Time: 1:14.917 on lap 14

Podium
First	(Colombia) Juan Pablo Montoya	Williams-BMW
Second	(United Kingdom) David Coulthard	McLaren-Mercedes
Third	(Italy) Jarno Trulli	Renault

The 2003 German Grand Prix (officially known as the Grosser Mobil 1 Preis von Deutschland 2003) was a Formula One motor race that took place on 3 August 2003 at the Hockenheimring in Hockenheim, Germany. It was the twelfth round of the 2003 Formula One World Championship. Juan Pablo Montoya took pole position for the race in the BMW Williams and went on to take the race win, ahead of David Coulthard for McLaren and Jarno Trulli for Renault.

== Background ==
The event was held at the Hockenheimring in Hockenheim for the 27th time in the circuit's history, across the weekend of 1–3 August. The Grand Prix was the twelfth round of the 2003 Formula One World Championship and the 56th running of the German Grand Prix as part of the Formula One World Championship.

=== Championship standings before the race ===
Going into the weekend, Michael Schumacher led the Drivers' Championship with 69 points, 7 points ahead of Kimi Räikkönen in second and 14 ahead of Juan Pablo Montoya in third. Ferrari, with 118 points, led the Constructors' Championship from BMW Williams and McLaren, who were second and third with 108 and 95 points, respectively.

=== Driver changes ===
After a string of disappointing results, Antônio Pizzonia was dropped by the Jaguar team. They hired Minardi driver Justin Wilson to replace him, with the Italian team attracting Formula 3000 driver Nicolas Kiesa to complete their line-up. Pizzonia would return to Formula One in 2004 as a test driver for Williams.

== Practice ==
Three free practice sessions were held for the event. McLaren driver David Coulthard set the fastest time in the first session, ahead of the Renaults of Jarno Trulli and Fernando Alonso, in second and third places respectively. The second session was topped by Juan Pablo Montoya in the BMW Williams, ahead of Rubens Barrichello and Ralf Schumacher. The same three led the third practice session, but now in the order Schumacher, Barrichello, Montoya.

=== Friday drivers ===
Three teams in the 2003 Constructors' Championship had the right to run a third car during an additional private testing session on Friday. These drivers did not compete in qualifying or the race.

Constructor	Nat	Driver
Renault	(United Kingdom)	Allan McNish
Jordan-Ford	(Hungary)	Zsolt Baumgartner
Minardi-Cosworth	(Italy)	Gianmaria Bruni

== Qualifying ==
Qualiyfing consisted of two one-hour sessions, one on Friday and one on Saturday afternoon. The first session's running order was determined by the Drivers' Championship standings, with the leading driver going first. Each driver was allowed to set one lap time. The result determined the running order in the second session: the fastest driver in the first session was allowed to go last in the second session, which usually provided the benefit of a cleaner track. Drivers were again allowed to set one lap time, which determined the order on the grid for the race on Sunday, with the fastest driver scoring pole position.

Pos	No	Driver	Constructor	Q1 Time	Q2 Time	Gap	Grid
1	3	(Colombia) Juan Pablo Montoya	Williams-BMW	1:14.673	1:15.167	—	1
2	4	(Germany) Ralf Schumacher	Williams-BMW	1:14.427	1:15.185	+0.018	2
3	2	(Brazil) Rubens Barrichello	Ferrari	1:15.399	1:15.488	+0.321	3
4	7	(Italy) Jarno Trulli	Renault	1:15.004	1:15.679	+0.512	4
5	6	(Finland) Kimi Räikkönen	McLaren-Mercedes	1:15.276	1:15.874	+0.707	5
6	1	(Germany) Michael Schumacher	Ferrari	1:15.456	1:15.898	+0.731	6
7	20	(France) Olivier Panis	Toyota	1:15.471	1:16.034	+0.867	7
8	8	(Spain) Fernando Alonso	Renault	1:15.214	1:16.483	+1.316	8
9	21	(Brazil) Cristiano da Matta	Toyota	1:16.450	1:16.550	+1.383	9
10	5	(United Kingdom) David Coulthard	McLaren-Mercedes	1:15.557	1:16.666	+1.499	10
11	14	(Australia) Mark Webber	Jaguar-Cosworth	1:15.030	1:16.775	+1.608	11
12	11	(Italy) Giancarlo Fisichella	Jordan-Ford	1:17.111	1:16.831	+1.664	12
13	16	(Canada) Jacques Villeneuve	BAR-Honda	No time^{1}	1:17.090	+1.923	13
14	10	(Germany) Heinz-Harald Frentzen	Sauber-Petronas	1:15.968	1:17.169	+2.002	14
15	9	(Germany) Nick Heidfeld	Sauber-Petronas	1:15.985	1:17.557	+2.390	15
16	15	(United Kingdom) Justin Wilson	Jaguar-Cosworth	1:15.373	1:18.021	+2.854	16
17	17	(United Kingdom) Jenson Button	BAR-Honda	1:15.754	1:18.085	+2.918	17
18	12	(Republic of Ireland) Ralph Firman	Jordan-Ford	1:17.044	1:18.341	+3.174	18
19	19	(Netherlands) Jos Verstappen	Minardi-Cosworth	1:17.702	1:19.023	+3.856	19
20	18	(Denmark) Nicolas Kiesa	Minardi-Cosworth	No time^{2}	1:19.174	+4.007	20

Notes

- ^1 – Jacques Villeneuve was left without time in Q1 after spinning off the track and abandoning the attempt.
- ^2 – Nicolas Kiesa was left without a time in Q1, due to an anti-stall system issue in the car.

== Race ==
The race was held on 3 August 2003 and was run for 67 laps.

=== Race report ===
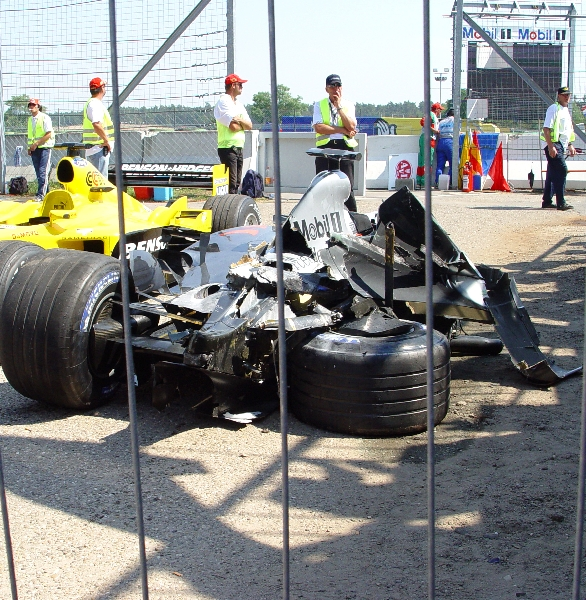
Kimi Räikkönen and Ralph Firman were among the six drivers that retired on the first lap.

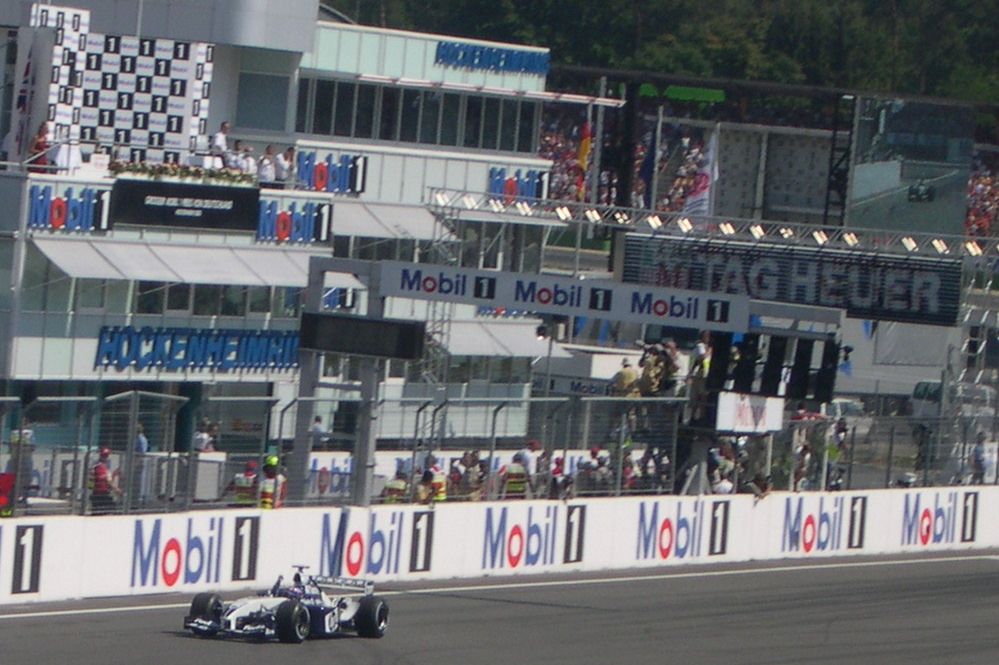
Juan Pablo Montoya wins the Grand Prix.

At the start, Juan Pablo Montoya kept his lead but teammate Ralf Schumacher with a bad start was under threat from Rubens Barrichello and Kimi Räikkönen. The German moved to the left and, knowingly or not, squeezed his rivals. The two collided and crashed out of the race, before Schumacher retired at the end of the lap with damage to his sidepod. In a reaction to the frontrunners braking, Heinz-Harald Frentzen was hit from behind by Ralph Firman and Jacques Villeneuve was spun by Justin Wilson. Wilson and Firman then collided to complete the mayhem.

The safety car was deployed to clear the track and after four laps the race resumed. Montoya was leading the Renaults of Jarno Trulli and Fernando Alonso. After the first round of pit stops, Montoya had stretched his lead to over twelve seconds, despite experiencing issues with his throttle. Michael Schumacher overtook Alonso on lap 30, but the pack was now more than 20 seconds behind the leader. After two more rounds of pit stops, Schumacher also passed Trulli, but with four laps to go, his rear left tyre burst and he retreated to the pits for a replacement. Montoya won the race, over a minute ahead of tenth-starting David Coulthard in second and Trulli in third. The Italian was treated by the doctors for suffering a heat stroke.

This was Montoya's second win, Coulthard's second podium and Trulli's first podium of the season. With Olivier Panis and Cristiano da Matta finishing fifth and sixth, respectively, this was Toyota's first double points finish. Finally, it was Michael Schumacher's worst race since his retirement in Brazil, decreasing his lead in the Drivers' Championship to just six points over Montoya.

=== Post-race ===
Montoya's second win of the season elevated him to second in the championship behind Michael Schumacher, not even a victory of points behind him. Montoya overtook Räikkönen for second, three points clear from him. With four races remaining, the top five drivers were covered by only 22 points. Meanwhile, Williams and McLaren were able to decrease their respective points disadvantage towards Ferrari, only being two and seventeen points behind the latter in the championship.

=== Race classification ===
Pos	No	Driver	Constructor	Tyre	Laps	Time/Retired	Grid	Points
1	3	(Colombia) Juan Pablo Montoya	Williams-BMW	M	67	1:28:48.769	1	10
2	5	(United Kingdom) David Coulthard	McLaren-Mercedes	M	67	+1:05.459	10	8
3	7	(Italy) Jarno Trulli	Renault	M	67	+1:09.060	4	6
4	8	(Spain) Fernando Alonso	Renault	M	67	+1:09.344	8	5
5	20	(France) Olivier Panis	Toyota	M	66	+1 Lap	7	4
6	21	(Brazil) Cristiano da Matta	Toyota	M	66	+1 Lap	9	3
7	1	(Germany) Michael Schumacher	Ferrari	B	66	+1 Lap	6	2
8	17	(United Kingdom) Jenson Button	BAR-Honda	B	66	+1 Lap	17	1
9	16	(Canada) Jacques Villeneuve	BAR-Honda	B	65	+2 Laps	13	
10	9	(Germany) Nick Heidfeld	Sauber-Petronas	B	65	+2 Laps	15	
11	14	(Australia) Mark Webber	Jaguar-Cosworth	M	64	Accident	11	
12	18	(Denmark) Nicolas Kiesa	Minardi-Cosworth	B	62	+5 Laps	20	
13	11	(Italy) Giancarlo Fisichella	Jordan-Ford	B	60	Engine	12	
Ret	19	(Netherlands) Jos Verstappen	Minardi-Cosworth	B	23	Hydraulics	19	
Ret	15	(United Kingdom) Justin Wilson	Jaguar-Cosworth	M	6	Gearbox	16	
Ret	4	(Germany) Ralf Schumacher	Williams-BMW	M	1	Collision damage	2	
Ret	10	(Germany) Heinz-Harald Frentzen	Sauber-Petronas	B	1	Collision damage	14	
Ret	2	(Brazil) Rubens Barrichello	Ferrari	B	0	Collision	3	
Ret	6	(Finland) Kimi Räikkönen	McLaren-Mercedes	M	0	Collision	5	
Ret	12	(Republic of Ireland) Ralph Firman	Jordan-Ford	B	0	Collision	18	

== Championship standings after the race ==
Drivers' Championship standings

+/–	Pos	Driver	Points
	1	(Germany) **Michael Schumacher***	71
1	2	(Colombia) **Juan Pablo Montoya***	65
1	3	(Finland) **Kimi Räikkönen***	62
	4	(Germany) **Ralf Schumacher***	53
	5	(Brazil) **Rubens Barrichello***	49

Constructors' Championship standings

+/–	Pos	Constructor	Points
	1	(Italy) **Ferrari***	120
	2	(United Kingdom) **Williams-BMW***	118
	3	(United Kingdom) **McLaren-Mercedes***	103
	4	(France) **Renault***	66
	5	(United Kingdom) BAR-Honda	15

- Note: Only the top five positions are included for both sets of standings.
- Competitors in bold and marked with an asterisk still had a theoretical chance of becoming World Champion.

Previous race: 2003 British Grand Prix	FIA Formula One World Championship; 2003 season	Next race: 2003 Hungarian Grand Prix
Previous race: 2002 German Grand Prix	German Grand Prix	Next race: 2004 German Grand Prix
