= Nicolas Kiesa =

Danish racing driver (born 1978)

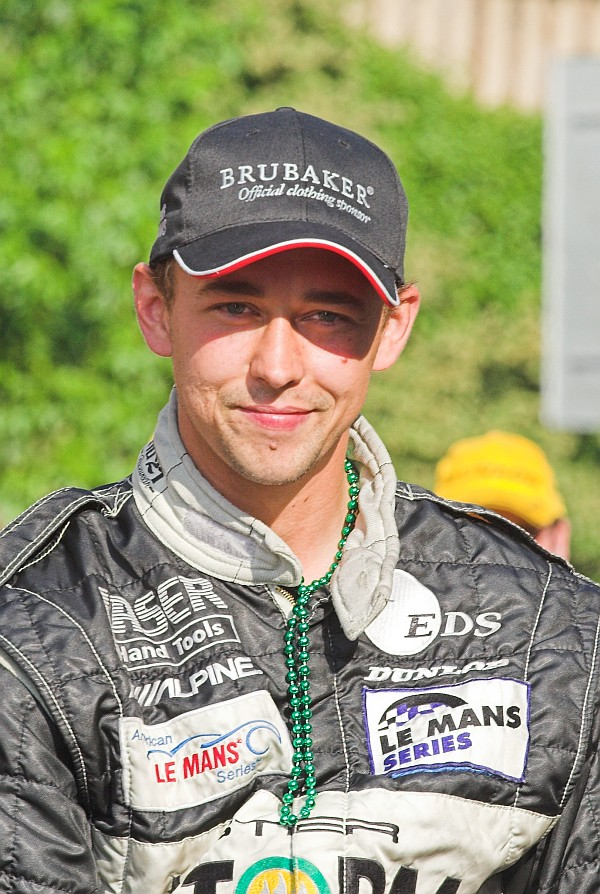
- Born: 3 March 1978 (age 48); Copenhagen, Denmark

Formula One World Championship career
- Nationality: (Denmark) Danish
- Active years: 2003
- Team(s): Minardi, Jordan
- Entries: 5
- Championships: 0
- Wins: 0
- Podiums: 0
- Career points: 0
- Pole positions: 0
- Fastest laps: 0
- First entry: 2003 German Grand Prix
- Last entry: 2003 Japanese Grand Prix

Nicolas Kiesa (born 3 March 1978) is a Danish former racing driver of Italian descent. He participated in five Formula One Grands Prix in the 2003 season, scoring no championship points.

Previously, Kiesa had won the 2003 Formula 3000 race at Monaco, when Björn Wirdheim slowed on the last lap on the front straight to greet his team.

Kiesa returned to Formula One in 2005, replacing Robert Doornbos as Jordan's third driver for the German Grand Prix and for the rest of the season.

== Formula One ==
Kiesa drove for the Minardi team for five races in 2003, taking the seat vacated after Justin Wilson moved to Jaguar. He made his debut in the German Grand Prix at Hockenheim, which he finished in 12th position. Kiesa finished all five races, his best result being 11th in the USA Grand Prix at Indianapolis, but did not outqualify his teammate Jos Verstappen at any race.

== Racing record ==
=== Career summary ===
Season	Series	Team	Races	Wins	Poles	F/Laps	Podiums	Points	Position
1997	British Formula Ford Winter Series	?	?	?	?	?	?	?	4th
1998	British Formula Ford Championship	?	?	1	?	?	7	104	4th
1999	British Formula Ford Championship	?	?	7	?	?	7	157	1st
1999	Formula Ford EuroCup	?	?	?	?	?	?	?	3rd
2000	British Formula Three Championship	RC Benetton Junior Team	14	1	2	1	3	77	6th
2001	British Formula Three Championship	RC Prost Junior Team	12	0	0	0	0	44	14th
2001	German Formula Three Championship	GM Motorsport	12	0	0	1	0	17	20th
2002	International Formula 3000 Championship	PSM Racing Line	12	0	0	0	0	3	12th
2003	International Formula 3000 Championship	Den Blå Avis	6	1	0	0	2	20	7th
2003	Formula One	Trust Minardi Cosworth	5	0	0	0	0	0	23rd
2004	Porsche Carrera Cup Scandinavia	?	2	?	?	?	?	?	?
2005	Formula One	Jordan Grand Prix	Test Driver						
2006	Le Mans Series - LMP1	Lister Storm Racing	2	0	0	0	1	8	14th
2006	24 Hours of Le Mans	Lister Storm Racing	1	0	0	0	0	N/A	N/A
2006	American Le Mans Series - GT1	Aston Martin Racing	1	0	0	0	0	19	10th
2006	Deutsche Tourenwagen Masters	Futurecom TME	3	0	0	0	0	0	23rd
2007	SEAT Leon Supacopa Deutschland	GAG Racing Team	2	0	0	0	0	0	NC

=== Complete British Formula Three Championship results ===
(key) (Races in bold indicate pole position; races in italics indicate fastest lap)

Year	Entrant	Chassis	Engine	Class	1	2	3	4	5	6	7	8	9	10	11	12	13	14	15	16	17	18	19	20	21	22	23	24	25	26	DC	Points
2000	RC Benetton Junior Team	Dallara F300	Spiess-Opel	Championship	THR; 8	**CRO**; Ret	OUL; Ret	DON; 5	DON; 7	SIL; 3	BRH; 12	DON; 6	**DON**; 1	CRO; 3	SIL; 10	SNE; Ret	SPA; 6	SIL; 11													6th	77
2001	RC Prost Junior Team	Dallara F301	Spiess-Opel	Championship	SIL1; 1; 8	SIL1; 2; 7	SNE; 1; 5	SNE; 2; 5	DON1; 1; 16	DON1; 2 Ret	OUL; 1; 13	OUL; 2; 8	CRO; 1; 4	CRO; 2; 4	ROC; 1 DNQ	ROC; 2 Ret	CAS; 1	CAS; 2	BRH1; 1	BRH1; 2	DON2; 1	DON2; 2	KNO; 1	KNO; 2	THR; 1	THR; 2	BRH2; 1	BRH2; 2	SIL2; 1	SIL2; 2	14th	46

=== Complete German Formula Three Championship results ===
(key) (Races in bold indicate pole position; races in italics indicate fastest lap)

Year	Entrant	Chassis	Engine	1	2	3	4	5	6	7	8	9	10	11	12	13	14	15	16	17	18	19	20	DC	Points
2001	GM Motorsport	Dallara F301	Toyota	HOC1; 1	HOC1; 2	NÜR1; 1	NÜR1; 2	OSC; 1	OSC; 2	SAC; 1	SAC; 2	NOR; 1; 15	NOR; 2; 12	HOC2; 1; 10	HOC2; 2; 14	LAU; 1 Ret	LAU; 2; 5	NÜR2; 1; 24	NÜR2; 2 Ret	A1R; 1; 6	A1R; 2 Ret	HOC3; 1; 19	HOC3; 2; 9	20th	17

=== Complete International Formula 3000 results ===
(key) (Races in bold indicate pole position; races in italics indicate fastest lap.)

Year	Entrant	1	2	3	4	5	6	7	8	9	10	11	12	DC	Points
2002	PSM Racing Line	INT; 15	IMO; 8	CAT; Ret	A1R; 10	MON; Ret	NUR; 10	SIL; 10	MAG; Ret	HOC; Ret	HUN; Ret	SPA; 6	MNZ; 5	12th	3
2003	Den Blå Avis	IMO; 12	CAT; 10	A1R; 6	MON; 1	NUR; 3	MAG; Ret							7th	20
2003	Super Nova Racing							SIL; 8	HOC	HUN	MNZ			7th	20

=== Complete Formula One results ===
(key)

Year	Entrant	Chassis	Engine	1	2	3	4	5	6	7	8	9	10	11	12	13	14	15	16	17	18	19	WDC	Points
2003	Trust Minardi Cosworth	Minardi PS03	Cosworth V10	AUS	MAL	BRA	SMR	ESP	AUT	MON	CAN	EUR	FRA	GBR	GER; 12	HUN; 13	ITA; 12	USA; 11	JPN; 16				23rd	0
2005	Jordan Grand Prix	Jordan EJ15	Toyota V10	AUS	MAL	BHR	SMR	ESP	MON	EUR	CAN	USA	FRA	GBR	GER; TD	HUN; TD	TUR; TD	ITA; TD	BEL; TD				–	–
2005	Jordan Grand Prix	Jordan EJ15B	Toyota V10																	BRA; TD	JPN	CHN; TD	–	–

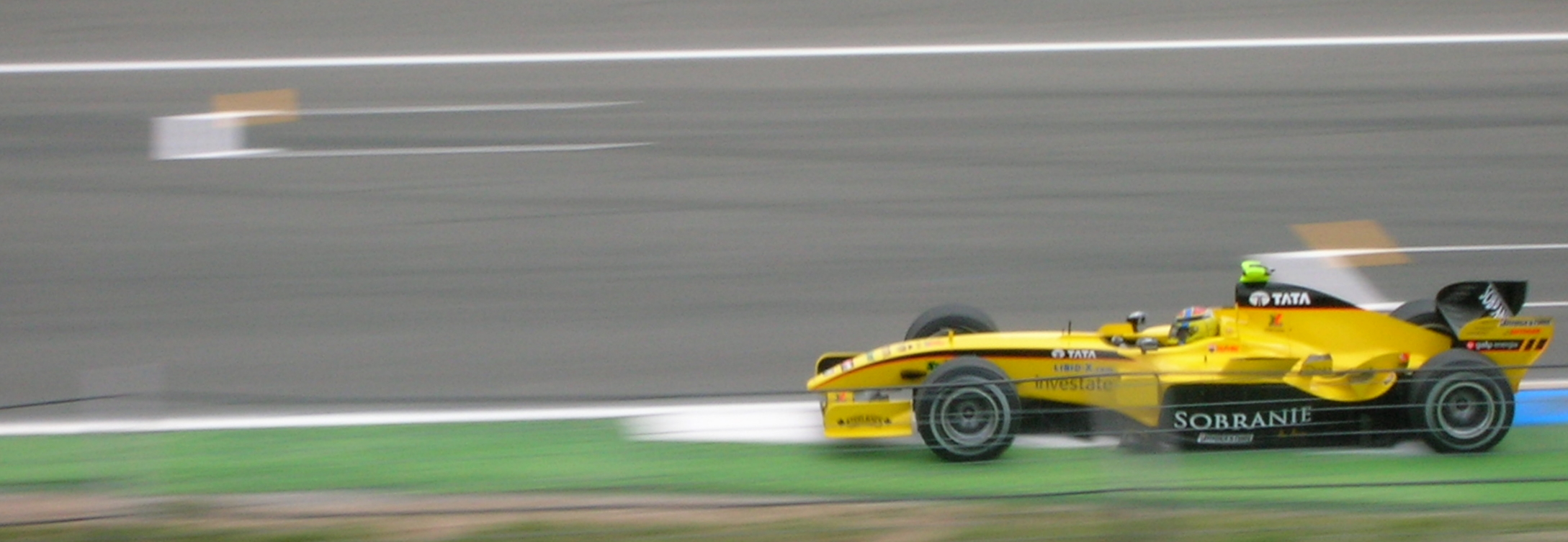
Nicolas Kiesa in Friday practice at the 2005 German Grand Prix

=== Complete DTM results ===
(key)

Year	Team	Car	1	2	3	4	5	6	7	8	9	10	Pos	Points
2006	Futurecom TME	Audi A4 DTM 2004	HOC	LAU	OSC	BRH	NOR	NÜR; 17	ZAN; 16	CAT; Ret	BUG	HOC	23rd	0

=== Complete 24 Hours of Le Mans results ===
Year	Team	Co-Drivers	Car	Class	Laps	Pos.	Class Pos.
2006	(United Kingdom) Lister Storm Racing	(United Kingdom) Gavin Pickering (Denmark) Jens Reno Møller	Lister Storm LMP Hybrid-Chevrolet	LMP1	192	DNF	DNF

Sporting positions
Preceded by Jenson Button	British Formula Ford; Champion; 1999	Succeeded by James Courtney
