= 2004 European Grand Prix =

Coordinates: 50°20′08″N 6°56′51″E

Race 7 of 18 in the 2004 Formula One World Championship
← Previous race	Next race →
- The Nürburgring

Race details
- Date: 30 May 2004
- Official name: 2004 Formula 1 Allianz Grand Prix of Europe
- Location: Nürburgring, Nürburg, Germany
- Course: Permanent racing facility
- Course length: 5.148 km (3.2 miles)
- Distance: 60 laps, 308.88 km (192 miles)
- Weather: Cloudy at start, sunny later

Pole position
Driver	(Germany) Michael Schumacher	Ferrari
- Time: 1:28.351

Fastest lap
Driver	(Germany) Michael Schumacher	Ferrari
- Time: 1:29.468 on lap 7

Podium
First	(Germany) Michael Schumacher	Ferrari
Second	(Brazil) Rubens Barrichello	Ferrari
Third	(United Kingdom) Jenson Button	BAR-Honda

The 2004 European Grand Prix (officially the 2004 Formula 1 Allianz Grand Prix of Europe) was a Formula One motor race held on 30 May 2004 at the Nürburgring. It was Race 7 of 18 in the 2004 FIA Formula One World Championship.

== Friday drivers ==
The bottom 6 teams in the 2003 Constructors' Championship were entitled to run a third car in free practice on Friday. These drivers drove on Friday but did not compete in qualifying or the race.

Constructor	Nat	Driver
BAR-Honda	(United Kingdom)	Anthony Davidson
Sauber-Petronas		-
Jaguar-Cosworth	(Sweden)	Björn Wirdheim
Toyota	(Brazil)	Ricardo Zonta
Jordan-Ford	(Germany)	Timo Glock
Minardi-Cosworth	(Belgium)	Bas Leinders

== Report ==
=== Background ===
Michael Schumacher in the drivers' championship with twelve points ahead of Rubens Barrichello and with 18 points ahead of Jenson Button. In the constructors' championship, Ferrari led Renault with 36 points and BAR-Honda with 48 points.

Earlier in the week, Williams announced important changes to its technical organization chart. After 26 years, in fact, Patrick Head left the position of technical director, being replaced by Sam Michael, previously responsible for track operations. The replacement was also due to growing tensions between the English team and the BMW engine engineer, dissatisfied with the negative results in the first part of the season.

=== Qualifying ===
Michael Schumacher dominated qualifying and obtained his fifth pole position of the season with an advantage of more than six tenths over the second best time, set by Sato. Sato broke the overall lap record with a time of 1:27.691 in the first qualifying session, and also took his first front row start.

=== Race ===
At the start, Michael Schumacher retained the lead. Behind the German driver, Trulli overtook Sato, who, however, gave the place back to his rival in the first corner. Further back, Montoya was too late when braking for the corner: the Colombian ended up ramming his teammate Ralf Schumacher, who in turn hit da Matta's Toyota. The latter and the German driver had to abandon the race, while Montoya returned to the pits with a damaged front wing and rejoined the race in last place.

A few corners after the start, Sato braked and Trulli took the opportunity to take second place. However, the Japanese didn't give up and continued to have a heated duel with Trulli, in which he ultimately got the upper hand and Trulli lost places. At the end of the first lap, Michael Schumacher crossed the finish line ahead of Räikkönen, Alonso, Sato, Barrichello, Button and Trulli. The German Ferrari driver was significantly faster than Räikkönen, on whom he gained almost two seconds per lap. The Finn acted as a blocker against the chasing group, which was significantly faster, but could not overtake him and thus fell significantly behind Michael Schumacher.

Michael Schumacher opened the first series of pit stops on the 8th lap. A lap later, Räikkönen also refueled, and shortly after leaving the pits he parked his McLaren at the side of the track with a broken engine. In the following laps, all drivers made their first stop, with the exception of Barrichello, Coulthard and Fisichella, who started with a two-stop strategy. The Brazilian then led for a few laps before refueling on lap 16. The last driver to make his first stop was Fisichella on lap 24. Michael Schumacher continued to lead the race ahead of Sato, Barrichello, Button, Trulli, Alonso and Webber. Further back, Montoya struggled to recover from the first lap accident, while Coulthard retired after having to retire with engine failure like his teammate.

The second set of stops allowed Barrichello to overtake Sato; Behind the Japanese were Button, Trulli, Alonso and Webber. Virtually nothing happened until lap 42, when Alonso opened the third and final series of pit stops. Barrichello overtook Sato again, but the Japanese driver, who had less fuel on board, attacked him on lap 46. Sato's action was unsuccessful and in the end the two came into contact: the BAR driver damaged his front wing, while Barrichello's car suffered no significant damage. Sato returned to the pits to change the nose, but shortly afterwards his car's gearbox gave up. Button moved up to third place. There were no further notable events and Michael Schumacher won the sixth of seven races since the start of the season; Behind him were Barrichello, Button, Trulli, Alonso, Fisichella, Webber and Montoya.

Schumacher and Barrichello left the champagne unsprayed after the death of former Fiat chairman Umberto Agnelli, who had died of lymphatic cancer aged 69 on 27 May.

== Classification ==
=== Qualifying ===
Pos	No	Driver	Constructor	Q1 Time	Q2 Time	Gap	Grid
1	1	(Germany) Michael Schumacher	Ferrari	1:28.278	1:28.351	—	1
2	10	(Japan) Takuma Sato	BAR-Honda	1:27.691	1:28.986	+0.635	2
3	7	(Italy) Jarno Trulli	Renault	1:29.905	1:29.135	+0.784	3
4	6	(Finland) Kimi Räikkönen	McLaren-Mercedes	1:28.897	1:29.137	+0.786	4
5	9	(United Kingdom) Jenson Button	BAR-Honda	1:28.816	1:29.245	+0.894	5
6	8	(Spain) Fernando Alonso	Renault	1:29.069	1:29.313	+0.962	6
7	2	(Brazil) Rubens Barrichello	Ferrari	1:29.014	1:29.353	+1.002	7
8	3	(Colombia) Juan Pablo Montoya	Williams-BMW	1:29.092	1:29.354	+1.003	8
9	4	(Germany) Ralf Schumacher	Williams-BMW	1:28.655	1:29.459	+1.108	9
10	17	(France) Olivier Panis	Toyota	1:29.243	1:29.697	+1.346	10
11	16	(Brazil) Cristiano da Matta	Toyota	1:29.272	1:29.706	+1.355	11
12	15	(Austria) Christian Klien	Jaguar-Cosworth	1:30.933	1:31.431	+3.080	12
13	18	(Germany) Nick Heidfeld	Jordan-Ford	1:32.216	1:31.604	+3.253	13
14	14	(Australia) Mark Webber	Jaguar-Cosworth	1:30.579	1:31.797^{1}	+3.446	14
15	19	(Italy) Giorgio Pantano	Jordan-Ford	1:31.928	1:31.979	+3.628	15
16	12	(Brazil) Felipe Massa	Sauber-Petronas	1:31.879	1:31.982	+3.631	16
17	21	(Hungary) Zsolt Baumgartner	Minardi-Cosworth	1:33.061	1:34.398	+6.047	17^{2}
18	5	(United Kingdom) David Coulthard	McLaren-Mercedes	1:28.717	No time^{4}		20^{2}
19	11	(Italy) Giancarlo Fisichella	Sauber-Petronas	1:29.327	No time^{5}		18^{2}
20	20	(Italy) Gianmaria Bruni	Minardi-Cosworth	1:33.077	1:34.022^{3}	+5.671	19^{2}

Notes

- ^1 – Mark Webber initially set a lap time of (1:30.797), but received a one-second time penalty for ignoring yellow flags in practice.
- ^2 – Zsolt Baumgartner, David Coulthard, Giancarlo Fisichella and Gianmaria Bruni received a 10-place grid penalty for engine changes.
- ^3 – Gianmaria Bruni had his time set (1:34.022) canceled for leaving the pits with the red light on.
- ^4 – David Coulthard did not get time in Q2 due to gearbox problems.
- ^5 – Giancarlo Fisichella did not set a time in the second section to save fuel and tyres.

=== Race ===
Pos	No	Driver	Constructor	Tyre	Laps	Time/Retired	Grid	Points
1	1	(Germany) Michael Schumacher	Ferrari	B	60	1:32:35.101	1	10
2	2	(Brazil) Rubens Barrichello	Ferrari	B	60	+17.989	7	8
3	9	(United Kingdom) Jenson Button	BAR-Honda	M	60	+22.533	5	6
4	7	(Italy) Jarno Trulli	Renault	M	60	+53.673	3	5
5	8	(Spain) Fernando Alonso	Renault	M	60	+1:00.987	6	4
6	11	(Italy) Giancarlo Fisichella	Sauber-Petronas	B	60	+1:13.448	18	3
7	14	(Australia) Mark Webber	Jaguar-Cosworth	M	60	+1:16.206	14	2
8	3	(Colombia) Juan Pablo Montoya	Williams-BMW	M	59	+1 Lap	8	1
9	12	(Brazil) Felipe Massa	Sauber-Petronas	B	59	+1 Lap	16	
10	18	(Germany) Nick Heidfeld	Jordan-Ford	B	59	+1 Lap	13	
11	17	(France) Olivier Panis	Toyota	M	59	+1 Lap	10	
12	15	(Austria) Christian Klien	Jaguar-Cosworth	M	59	+1 Lap	12	
13	19	(Italy) Giorgio Pantano	Jordan-Ford	B	58	+2 Laps	15	
14	20	(Italy) Gianmaria Bruni	Minardi-Cosworth	B	57	+3 Laps	19	
15	21	(Hungary) Zsolt Baumgartner	Minardi-Cosworth	B	57	+3 Laps	17	
Ret	10	(Japan) Takuma Sato	BAR-Honda	M	47	Engine	2	
Ret	5	(United Kingdom) David Coulthard	McLaren-Mercedes	M	25	Engine	20	
Ret	6	(Finland) Kimi Räikkönen	McLaren-Mercedes	M	9	Engine	4	
Ret	4	(Germany) Ralf Schumacher	Williams-BMW	M	0	Collision	9	
Ret	16	(Brazil) Cristiano da Matta	Toyota	M	0	Collision	11	

== Championship standings after the race ==
Drivers' Championship standings

+/–	Pos	Driver	Points
	1	(Germany) Michael Schumacher	60
	2	(Brazil) Rubens Barrichello	46
	3	(United Kingdom) Jenson Button	38
	4	(Italy) Jarno Trulli	36
1	5	(Spain) Fernando Alonso	25

Constructors' Championship standings

+/–	Pos	Constructor	Points
	1	(Italy) Ferrari	106
	2	(France) Renault	61
	3	(United Kingdom) BAR-Honda	46
	4	(United Kingdom) Williams-BMW	36
	5	(Switzerland) Sauber-Petronas	10

- Note: Only the top five positions are included for both sets of standings.

== See also ==
- 2004 Nürburgring F3000 round

Previous race: 2004 Monaco Grand Prix	FIA Formula One World Championship; 2004 season	Next race: 2004 Canadian Grand Prix
Previous race: 2003 European Grand Prix	European Grand Prix	Next race: 2005 European Grand Prix
