= 2004 Monaco Grand Prix =

Formula One motor race held in 2004

Coordinates: 43°44′4.74″N 7°25′16.8″E

Race 6 of 18 in the 2004 Formula One World Championship
← Previous race	Next race →

Race details
- Date: 23 May 2004
- Official name: Formula 1 Grand Prix de Monaco 2004
- Location: Circuit de Monaco, La Condamine and Monte Carlo, Monaco
- Course: Street circuit
- Course length: 3.34 km (2.07 miles)
- Distance: 77 laps, 257.18 km (159.08 miles)
- Scheduled distance: 78 laps, 260.52 km (161.85 miles)
- Weather: Dry and sunny

Pole position
Driver	(Italy) Jarno Trulli	Renault
- Time: 1:13.985

Fastest lap
Driver	(Germany) Michael Schumacher	Ferrari
- Time: 1:14.439 on lap 23 (lap record)

Podium
First	(Italy) Jarno Trulli	Renault
Second	(United Kingdom) Jenson Button	BAR-Honda
Third	(Brazil) Rubens Barrichello	Ferrari

The 2004 Monaco Grand Prix (formally the Formula 1 Grand Prix de Monaco 2004) was a Formula One motor race held on 23 May 2004, at the Circuit de Monaco, contested over 77 laps. It was Race 6 of 18 in the 2004 FIA Formula One World Championship. The race was won by Renault driver Jarno Trulli; his only victory in Formula One. BAR driver, Jenson Button finished in second position, one second behind Trulli and Rubens Barrichello took the third and final podium spot for Ferrari.

In fine conditions Trulli beat Button to the first corner off the grid, and the fast starting Takuma Sato beat Kimi Räikkönen and Michael Schumacher to fourth place before retiring at the end of the second lap. On lap three the safety car was deployed due to a collision between David Coulthard and Giancarlo Fisichella, with the race resuming on lap seven. The two Renault drivers, Trulli and Fernando Alonso remained close together at the front of the race until the pit stops which briefly saw Michael Schumacher lead the race. Alonso retired after crashing trying to lap Ralf Schumacher, and a second safety car period ensued. After briefly leading, Michael Schumacher retired behind the safety car following a collision with Juan Pablo Montoya, who subsequently finished fourth. Schumacher's retirement elevated Button to second, and Trulli to the lead. Button subsequently reduced Trulli's lead, and the pair raced closely until the finish.

The race was Trulli's sole victory of his F1 career. The retirement of Michael Schumacher, the defending Drivers' Champion, brought to an end his run of five successive victories from the inaugural race of the season. Despite his retirement, Schumacher departed Monaco as the points leader, ahead of Barrichello and Button. Trulli's victory placed him ten points ahead of his teammate Alonso. Ferrari maintained their lead in the Constructors' Championship, 36 points ahead of Renault and 48 ahead of BAR, with 12 races of the season remaining.

== Report ==
=== Practice and qualifying ===
Michael Schumacher during free practice

Four practice sessions were held before the qualifying session, two on the Thursday before the race, and two on Saturday morning before the qualifying session. The driver's championship leader, the Ferrari driver Michael Schumacher, was fastest in all four practice sessions, and in the final session set a record lap time for the Monaco circuit, of 1:14.014. Schumacher's record time was set in response to a fast lap time from Jarno Trulli. The Jaguar driver Mark Webber suffered an engine failure in the final practice session, and for changing his engine suffered an automatic 10 place grid penalty for the subsequent qualifying session, a penalty also suffered by Ralf Schumacher, for an engine failure in the first practice session.

The Bridgestone tyres used by Schumacher were inferior to the Michelin tyres used by the Renault, BAR and Williams teams at the Monaco weekend. In the weeks before the Monaco race Bridgestone had worked with the Ferrari team on tyres that could perform a fast single lap during qualifying and the opening laps of the race. Schumacher had set his fast practice times on soft tyres, but after his tyres had struggled on a slippery track, Schumacher and the other Bridgestone teams returned to hard tyres.

=== Qualifying ===
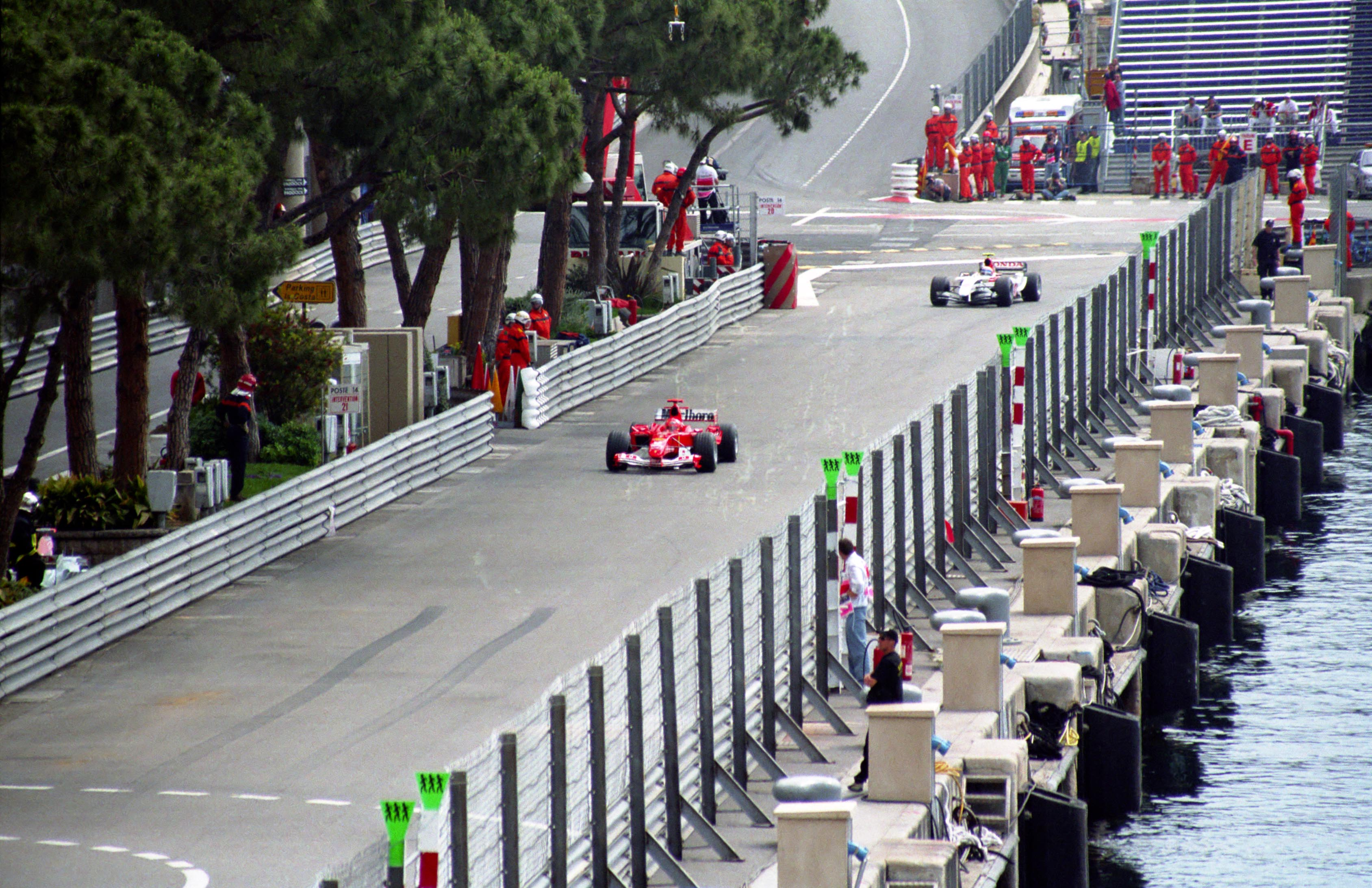
Michael Schumacher and Takuma Sato, in qualifying, en route to setting the fifth and eighth best times respectively

Michael Schumacher had won pole at four of the last five races. In recent years the Monaco Grand Prix had rarely been won from pole position, the last winner from pole before 2004 had been Mika Häkkinen at the 1998 Monaco Grand Prix and Michael Schumacher at the 1994 Monaco Grand Prix.

The first four fastest times in qualifying were set by cars with Michelin tyres. The Sauber team decided to use the soft Bridgestone tyre and their performance had suffered, with their drivers qualifying 10th and 16th.

Renault driver Jarno Trulli set his pole time of 1m13.985s, it was the fastest ever recorded around the Monaco circuit, and was the first pole position of his career. His time was 0.411 faster than the next driver. Trulli had previously started on the front row at Monaco in 2000. Of his first pole Trulli said that "I'm pretty impressed over my lap time because I couldn't believe I lapped under the 14s...I put in a very impressive lap. In Monaco, being on pole, which is something I have chased for such a long time, I'm so pleased."

BAR driver Jenson Button started the race alongside Trulli on the front row, although Williams driver Ralf Schumacher had qualified second, he was demoted to twelfth for changing his engine. Ralf Schumacher had qualified on pole at Monaco at the previous year's race. Trulli's Renault teammate Fernando Alonso qualified third, with Michael Schumacher eventually qualified fifth. Michael Schumacher was moved to fourth following his brother Ralf's demotion. Takuma Sato qualified seventh after a fast time in the first sector of the circuit, but a driving error damaged his chances of a quick lap.

"...Where we will end up from our situation is the big question. Monaco is a long race, it's not optimum where we start from, we're not very happy about that, but what can you do?"

— Michael Schumacher, following the qualifying session.

Following the qualifying session, a mini-bus carrying the session's three fastest drivers was hit by a car. No one was hurt in the incident. Trulli described the accident as "...a big surprise...Maybe they thought we had not taken enough risks already on the track. But I don't think so. Not during qualifying in Monte Carlo."

=== Race ===
The race began with Trulli on pole and BAR's Jenson Button behind; Renault's Fernando Alonso and Michael Schumacher occupied the second row. After two aborted starts (Olivier Panis stalled his Toyota and Trulli's Renault leaked coolant onto the track) the parade lap began; Panis stalled again and started the race from the pits. As the race began, BAR's Takuma Sato made an excellent start, moving from eighth to fourth in seconds. Presently Sato's engine began smoking; on the third lap, it exploded spectacularly and released an enormous cloud of smoke, in which Sauber's Giancarlo Fisichella collided with McLaren’s David Coulthard and overturned. Both drivers were unhurt but out of the race, as was Sato.

Out came the yellow flags, and the race proceeded under the safety car until the eighth lap, at which point Alonso fought Trulli for the lead, followed by Button. When the race restarted, Juan Pablo Montoya moved past Rubens Barrichello to take sixth position, and Trulli set three consecutive fastest laps, but was only able to increase his lead to 1.2 seconds over Alonso. The leaders began their first pit stops on lap 18, and by Michael Schumacher's stop on lap 26, Trulli led from Alonso, with Schumacher now in third ahead of both Kimi Räikkönen and Button.

On lap 28, Räikkönen retired with mechanical troubles, joining Jaguar's Christian Klien and Mark Webber, as well as Jordan's Giorgio Pantano and Minardi's Gianmaria Bruni on the sidelines.

"...I've been waiting so long to win and it came at the best race in Monaco...In the end I just took no risks. I was just doing what I had to do and just responding to the lap times and there was no point taking any risks. Everything was under control...It has been a faultless weekend and it is the best way to win – being on top all weekend"

— Jarno Trulli, following his victory in the race.

In an attempt to lap Ralf Schumacher, who was down in 11th position, Alonso tried to pass him offline around the outside in the tunnel and crashed heavily. Alonso was enraged by this incident, and publicly accused Ralf of dangerous driving. The safety car was immediately deployed, and all of the front-runners (except Michael Schumacher and Montoya) took the opportunity to pit. While following the safety car, Schumacher locked his left front tyre in the tunnel in an apparent attempt to generate heat in his brake pads and discs ahead of the restart. Montoya, directly behind, moved to the inside trying to avoid running into the back of Schumacher. However, as Schumacher continued there was no space between his car and the barrier for Montoya's and he clipped Montoya's left front tyre with his right rear, spun sideways and hit the barriers. This accident ended Schumacher's hopes for a sixth consecutive victory and a perfect season. Upon investigations, the stewards declined to apportion blame to either driver.

As the order settled down towards the end of the race, Trulli led from Button, with Barrichello in third. The top three were a lap in front of the rest of the field, and the only drivers with a chance of winning the race. Barrichello needed to pit with 22 laps remaining, and rejoined too far behind the top two in order to make a challenge. From then on, it was a straight fight between Trulli and Button, but the Circuit de Monaco is notoriously the hardest circuit to make a passing move on. Therefore, Button having no chance of passing, Trulli took the win by close to half a second.

Following what would turn out to be the only Grand Prix win of his Formula One career, Trulli was left literally speechless during interviews, having teammate Alonso conduct interviews on his behalf.

Jaguar unveiled a special Monaco livery to promote the new Ocean's Twelve film. The car's airbox and red-painted nose featured the movie's logo, and the car's nose featured a diamond worth $300,000 owned by jewelry brand Steinmetz. Klien crashed into the guardrails at the Loews hairpin on the first lap. When Jaguar personnel arrived at the crash site, the diamond was gone.

== Thursday drivers ==
The bottom 6 teams in the 2003 Constructors' Championship were entitled to run a third car in free practice on Thursday. These drivers drove on Thursday but did not compete in qualifying or the race.

Constructor	Nat	Driver
BAR-Honda	(United Kingdom)	Anthony Davidson
Sauber-Petronas		–
Jaguar-Cosworth	(Sweden)	Björn Wirdheim
Toyota	(Brazil)	Ricardo Zonta
Jordan-Ford	(Germany)	Timo Glock
Minardi-Cosworth	(Belgium)	Bas Leinders

== Classification ==
=== Qualifying ===
Pos	No	Driver	Constructor	Q1 Time	Q2 Time	Gap	Grid
1	7	(Italy) Jarno Trulli	Renault	1:14.993	1:13.985	—	1
2	4	(Germany) Ralf Schumacher	Williams-BMW	1:14.483	1:14.345	+0.360	12^{1}
3	9	(United Kingdom) Jenson Button	BAR-Honda	1:14.799	1:14.396	+0.411	2
4	8	(Spain) Fernando Alonso	Renault	1:14.816	1:14.408	+0.423	3
5	1	(Germany) Michael Schumacher	Ferrari	1:15.927	1:14.516	+0.531	4
6	6	(Finland) Kimi Räikkönen	McLaren-Mercedes	1:14.659	1:14.592	+0.607	5
7	2	(Brazil) Rubens Barrichello	Ferrari	1:15.329	1:14.716	+0.731	6
8	10	(Japan) Takuma Sato	BAR-Honda	1:14.931	1:14.827	+0.842	7
9	5	(United Kingdom) David Coulthard	McLaren-Mercedes	1:14.728	1:14.951	+0.966	8
10	3	(Colombia) Juan Pablo Montoya	Williams-BMW	1:15.029	1:15.039	+1.054	9
11	11	(Italy) Giancarlo Fisichella	Sauber-Petronas	1:14.814	1:15.352	+1.367	10
12	14	(Australia) Mark Webber	Jaguar-Cosworth	1:16.161	1:15.725	+1.740	11
13	17	(France) Olivier Panis	Toyota	1:15.125	1:15.859	+1.874	13
14	15	(Austria) Christian Klien	Jaguar-Cosworth	1:16.379	1:15.919	+1.934	14
15	16	(Brazil) Cristiano da Matta	Toyota	1:15.738	1:16.169	+2.184	15
16	12	(Brazil) Felipe Massa	Sauber-Petronas	1:15.436	1:16.248	+2.263	16
17	18	(Germany) Nick Heidfeld	Jordan-Ford	1:16.914	1:16.488	+2.503	17
18	19	(Italy) Giorgio Pantano	Jordan-Ford	1:17.674	1:17.443	+3.458	18
19	21	(Hungary) Zsolt Baumgartner	Minardi-Cosworth	1:20.468	1:20.060	+6.075	19
20	20	(Italy) Gianmaria Bruni	Minardi-Cosworth	1:20.740	1:20.115	+6.130	20

Notes

- ^1 – Ralf Schumacher received a 10 position grid penalty for an engine change on Friday.

=== Race ===
Pos	No	Driver	Constructor	Tyre	Laps	Time/Retired	Grid	Points
1	7	(Italy) Jarno Trulli	Renault	M	77	1:45:46.601	1	10
2	9	(United Kingdom) Jenson Button	BAR-Honda	M	77	+0.497	2	8
3	2	(Brazil) Rubens Barrichello	Ferrari	B	77	+1:15.766	6	6
4	3	(Colombia) Juan Pablo Montoya	Williams-BMW	M	76	+1 Lap	9	5
5	12	(Brazil) Felipe Massa	Sauber-Petronas	B	76	+1 Lap	16	4
6	16	(Brazil) Cristiano da Matta	Toyota	M	76	+1 Lap	15	3
7	18	(Germany) Nick Heidfeld	Jordan-Ford	B	75	+2 Laps	17	2
8	17	(France) Olivier Panis	Toyota	M	74	+3 Laps	PL^{2}	1
9	21	(Hungary) Zsolt Baumgartner	Minardi-Cosworth	B	71	+6 Laps	19	
10	4	(Germany) Ralf Schumacher	Williams-BMW	M	69	Gearbox	12	
Ret	1	(Germany) Michael Schumacher	Ferrari	B	45	Collision damage	4	
Ret	8	(Spain) Fernando Alonso	Renault	M	41	Accident	3	
Ret	6	(Finland) Kimi Räikkönen	McLaren-Mercedes	M	27	Hydraulics	5	
Ret	20	(Italy) Gianmaria Bruni	Minardi-Cosworth	B	15	Gearbox	20	
Ret	19	(Italy) Giorgio Pantano	Jordan-Ford	B	12	Transmission	18	
Ret	14	(Australia) Mark Webber	Jaguar-Cosworth	M	11	Gearbox	11	
Ret	10	(Japan) Takuma Sato	BAR-Honda	M	2	Engine	7	
Ret	5	(United Kingdom) David Coulthard	McLaren-Mercedes	M	2	Collision damage	8	
Ret	11	(Italy) Giancarlo Fisichella	Sauber-Petronas	B	2	Collision	10	
Ret	15	(Austria) Christian Klien	Jaguar-Cosworth	M	0	Accident	14	

Notes

- ^2 – Olivier Panis started from the pit lane after he stalled at the start of the parade lap.

== Championship standings after the race ==
Drivers' Championship standings

+/–	Pos	Driver	Points
	1	(Germany) Michael Schumacher	50
	2	(Brazil) Rubens Barrichello	38
	3	(United Kingdom) Jenson Button	32
1	4	(Italy) Jarno Trulli	31
1	5	(Colombia) Juan Pablo Montoya	23

Constructors' Championship standings

+/–	Pos	Constructor	Points
	1	(Italy) Ferrari	88
	2	(France) Renault	52
	3	(United Kingdom) BAR-Honda	40
	4	(United Kingdom) Williams-BMW	35
1	5	(Switzerland) Sauber-Petronas	7

- Note: Only the top five positions are included for both sets of standings.

== See also ==
- 2004 Monaco F3000 round

Previous race: 2004 Spanish Grand Prix	FIA Formula One World Championship; 2004 season	Next race: 2004 European Grand Prix
Previous race: 2003 Monaco Grand Prix	Monaco Grand Prix	Next race: 2005 Monaco Grand Prix
