= 2004 Canadian Grand Prix =

Coordinates: 39°47′42″N 86°14′05″W

Race 8 of 18 in the 2004 Formula One World Championship
← Previous race	Next race →

Race details
- Date: 13 June 2004
- Official name: Formula 1 Grand Prix du Canada 2004
- Location: Circuit Gilles Villeneuve, Montreal, Quebec, Canada
- Course: Street circuit
- Course length: 4.361 km (2.710 miles)
- Distance: 70 laps, 305.270 km (189.686 miles)
- Weather: Clear and mild with temperatures approaching 25.0 °C (77.0 °F); Wind speeds up to 5.8 km/h (3.6 mph); Track 35 °C (95 °F)

Pole position
Driver	(Germany) Ralf Schumacher	Williams-BMW
- Time: 1:12.275

Fastest lap
Driver	(Brazil) Rubens Barrichello	Ferrari
- Time: 1:13.622 on lap 68

Podium
First	(Germany) Michael Schumacher	Ferrari
Second	(Brazil) Rubens Barrichello	Ferrari
Third	(United Kingdom) Jenson Button	BAR-Honda

The 2004 Canadian Grand Prix (officially the Formula 1 Grand Prix du Canada 2004) was a Formula One motor race held on 13 June 2004 at the Circuit Gilles Villeneuve. It was Race 8 of 18 in the 2004 FIA Formula One World Championship.

It was won by Michael Schumacher, with teammate Rubens Barrichello second, making for a 1-2 finish for Scuderia Ferrari Marlboro as part of a season where Ferrari took the most wins of the season and the driver's championship.

In the post race inspections, Williams and Toyota were excluded from the race due to illegal brake ducts.

This would be the last time that Scuderia Ferrari won in Canada until 2018 and the last time that more than two cars were disqualified from a race until the 2025 Chinese Grand Prix.

== Friday drivers ==
The bottom 6 teams in the 2003 Constructors' Championship were entitled to run a third car in free practice on Friday. These drivers drove on Friday but were not scheduled to compete in qualifying or the race.

Constructor	Nat	Driver
BAR-Honda	(United Kingdom)	Anthony Davidson
Sauber-Petronas		-
Jaguar-Cosworth	(Sweden)	Björn Wirdheim
Toyota	(Brazil)	Ricardo Zonta
Jordan-Ford	(Germany)	Timo Glock
Minardi-Cosworth	(Belgium)	Bas Leinders

== Report ==
The 2004 Canadian Grand Prix nearly did not happen, originally being dropped from the calendar in 2003 but later reinstated. The issue was to do with tobacco sponsorship.

It was the eighth race of the 2004 Formula One season, and was the first of two North American consecutive rounds. The Canadian Grand Prix 2004 was one of drama, but at the finish line Michael Schumacher took his 77th career victory, his 7th win of the 2004 season, and his 7th win in Canada. Timo Glock made his debut replacing Giorgio Pantano who did not compete due to personal circumstances. The Renaults were fast off the line as was expected, but a suspension failure put Jarno Trulli out of the race before he'd reached the second corner. Takuma Sato starting from the pit lane had a close shave with the two Jaguars and David Coulthard. Christian Klien's Jaguar was hit from behind, propelling him into the McLaren of Coulthard, which also resulted in a collision with Mark Webber who was forced to pit with a punctured tyre, but later retired with suspension failure.

After the start, Fernando Alonso was up to third behind pole sitter Ralf Schumacher and Jenson Button. Jordan debutante Timo Glock took advantage of the second corner tangle and managed to find himself in 10th. As the race progressed, Rubens Barrichello moved ahead of Kimi Räikkönen into 6th position, as Glock was forced back by faster cars. Sauber's Felipe Massa battled with the ailing Takuma Sato for 14th, as Coulthard moved up to 12th, with the Toyotas in a strong 8th and 9th. The McLaren's were first to pit as part of their three stop strategy, followed shortly by Button and Montoya. Ralf Schumacher was 5 seconds ahead of Alonso until he pitted and rejoined in fourth, whilst Alonso's podium hopes were later dashed by a problem with the fuel hose which forced the Renault pit crew to resort to the spare hose, costing Alonso an additional 16 seconds. Räikkönen's afternoon couldn't get much worse, as he served a drive through penalty for crossing the white line on his exit from the pit lane. Barrichello later rejoined after his first pit stop behind Montoya, to make the running order Ralf Schumacher, Jenson Button, Michael Schumacher, Juan Pablo Montoya, Rubens Barrichello and Fernando Alonso.

Nick Heidfeld was involved in an incident in the pit lane where the lollipop man lifted whilst the fuel hose was still attached, and the fuel man Mick Gomme was dragged along as the Jordan pulled away. The Saubers were on a long first stint and Giancarlo Fisichella did not pit until lap 25, surprisingly rejoining in the points. Meanwhile, Button was closing the gap to Ralf Schumacher, as Montoya did likewise to Ralf's older brother Michael.

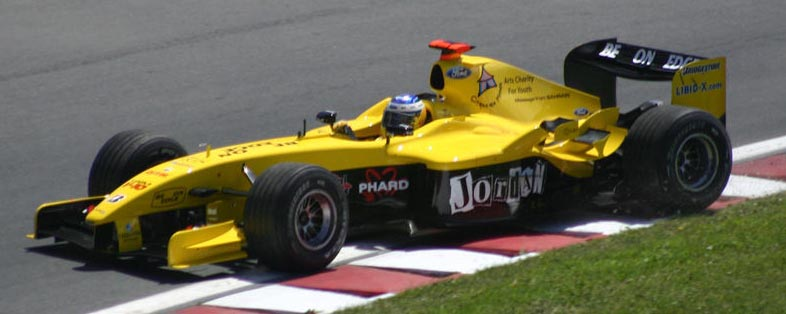
Heidfeld finished 12th, but was promoted to 8th because of other drivers being disqualified.

Minardi's Gianmaria Bruni was hauled in for a drive through penalty for speeding in the pit lane, but retired with gearbox failure shortly after. Ralf pitted again on lap 33, and rejoined in 3rd whilst Coulthard narrowly missed another collision with a fiery Christian Klien. In the second stint, Barrichello was seemingly much faster than his teammate Michael Schumacher, but could not find a way past the reigning champion. Alonso began to fly in fourth, as the adventurous Klien took an airborne trip over the grass. Alonso's charge was short-lived though, as his Renault pulled slowly to the side of the circuit with a driveshaft failure. Räikkönen, Barrichello and Michael Schumacher took their second pit stops without much hassle, although Schumacher had a leary moment when he almost hit the pit wall.

Ralf Schumacher then took his third and final stop, and so too did Montoya and Button. Takuma Sato's disappointing afternoon ended with the Honda engine exploding. As the final stages of the race approached, Michael Schumacher led brother Ralf, with Barrichello, Button, and Montoya following, and Räikkönen in sixth. Räikkönen then had to make yet another pit stop to change his steering wheel, dropping the Finn down to 7th.

With a few laps left to go, Felipe Massa suffered a rear suspension failure at the hairpin, a wheel flying beyond the retaining fence (nobody was injured) as his Sauber flew into the tyre barrier. The Brazilian was taken to hospital for precautionary tests, but was basically unharmed. Christian Klien continued an entertaining afternoon by spinning 360 degrees, narrowly avoiding a surprised Timo Glock.

The front runners remained the same until the chequered flag, Michael Schumacher and Scuderia Ferrari coming away with a 7th victory of the season. Younger brother Ralf, and Barrichello completed the podium portrait. Jenson Button ended the race in 4th, and Montoya finished in 5th. Giancarlo Fisichella's quiet race ended with an impressive 6th, with Räikkönen taking two points for seventh and Toyota's Cristiano da Matta taking the final point for 8th.

After the race, however, both Toyota's and Williams's cars were disqualified with brake irregularities, brake ducts seemingly not conforming to regulations. After the disqualification, Jenson Button claimed 3rd, with Giancarlo Fisichella taking 4th, Räikkönen and Coulthard taking 5th and 6th, and Glock and Nick Heidfeld in 7th and 8th respectively, giving Jordan points.

== Classification ==
=== Qualifying ===
Pos	No	Driver	Constructor	Q1 Time	Q2 Time	Gap	Grid
1	4	(Germany) Ralf Schumacher	Williams-BMW	1:12.441	1:12.275	—	1
2	9	(United Kingdom) Jenson Button	BAR-Honda	1:13.333	1:12.341	+0.066	2
3	7	(Italy) Jarno Trulli	Renault	1:13.149	1:13.023	+0.748	3
4	3	(Colombia) Juan Pablo Montoya	Williams-BMW	1:12.746	1:13.072	+0.797	4
5	8	(Spain) Fernando Alonso	Renault	1:12.826	1:13.308	+1.033	5
6	1	(Germany) Michael Schumacher	Ferrari	1:13.463	1:13.355	+1.080	6
7	2	(Brazil) Rubens Barrichello	Ferrari	1:13.782	1:13.562	+1.287	7
8	6	(Finland) Kimi Räikkönen	McLaren-Mercedes	1:13.602	1:13.595	+1.320	8
9	5	(United Kingdom) David Coulthard	McLaren-Mercedes	1:13.206	1:13.681	+1.406	9
10	15	(Austria) Christian Klien	Jaguar-Cosworth	1:14.751	1:14.532	+2.257	10
11	11	(Italy) Giancarlo Fisichella	Sauber-Petronas	1:13.663	1:14.674	+2.399	11
12	16	(Brazil) Cristiano da Matta	Toyota	1:13.807	1:14.851	+2.576	12
13	17	(France) Olivier Panis	Toyota	1:14.166	1:14.891	+2.616	13
14	14	(Australia) Mark Webber	Jaguar-Cosworth	1:14.715	1:15.148	+2.873	14
15	18	(Germany) Nick Heidfeld	Jordan-Ford	1:15.657	1:15.321	+3.046	15
16	19	(Germany) Timo Glock	Jordan-Ford	1:16.865	1:16.323	+4.048	16
17	10	(Japan) Takuma Sato	BAR-Honda	1:12.989	1:17.004	+4.729	17
18	21	(Hungary) Zsolt Baumgartner	Minardi-Cosworth	1:17.903	1:17.064	+4.789	18
19	12	(Brazil) Felipe Massa	Sauber-Petronas	1:14.392	No time^{1}		19
20	20	(Italy) Gianmaria Bruni	Minardi-Cosworth	No time^{2}	No time^{3}		20

Notes

- ^1 – Felipe Massa did not set a time in the second section after suffering a puncture and abandoning the attempt.
- ^2 – Gianmaria Bruni did not set a time in the first section after spinning and abandoned the attempt.
- ^3 – Gianmaria Bruni did not set a time in Q2 after his engine broke down and the car was set up for his teammate, so he returned straight to the pits and did not set a time.

=== Race ===
Pos	No	Driver	Constructor	Tyre	Laps	Time/Retired	Grid	Points
1	1	(Germany) Michael Schumacher	Ferrari	B	70	1:28:24.803	6	10
2	2	(Brazil) Rubens Barrichello	Ferrari	B	70	+5.108	7	8
3	9	(United Kingdom) Jenson Button	BAR-Honda	M	70	+20.409	2	6
4	11	(Italy) Giancarlo Fisichella	Sauber-Petronas	B	69	+1 Lap	11	5
5	6	(Finland) Kimi Räikkönen	McLaren-Mercedes	M	69	+1 Lap	8	4
6	5	(United Kingdom) David Coulthard	McLaren-Mercedes	M	69	+1 Lap	9	3
7	19	(Germany) Timo Glock	Jordan-Ford	B	68	+2 Laps	16	2
8	18	(Germany) Nick Heidfeld	Jordan-Ford	B	68	+2 Laps	15	1
9	15	(Austria) Christian Klien	Jaguar-Cosworth	M	67	+3 Laps	10	
10	21	(Hungary) Zsolt Baumgartner	Minardi-Cosworth	B	66	+4 Laps	18	
Ret	12	(Brazil) Felipe Massa	Sauber-Petronas	B	62	Accident	17	
Ret	10	(Japan) Takuma Sato	BAR-Honda	M	48	Engine	PL^{4}	
Ret	8	(Spain) Fernando Alonso	Renault	M	44	Driveshaft	5	
Ret	20	(Italy) Gianmaria Bruni	Minardi-Cosworth	B	30	Gearbox	PL^{4}	
Ret	14	(Australia) Mark Webber	Jaguar-Cosworth	M	6	Suspension	14	
Ret	7	(Italy) Jarno Trulli	Renault	M	0	Transmission	3	
DSQ	4	(Germany) Ralf Schumacher	Williams-BMW	M	70	Illegal brake ducts (+1.062)^{5}	1	
DSQ	3	(Colombia) Juan Pablo Montoya	Williams-BMW	M	70	Illegal brake ducts (+21.200)^{5}	4	
DSQ	16	(Brazil) Cristiano da Matta	Toyota	M	69	Illegal brake ducts (+1 Lap)^{5}	12	
DSQ	17	(France) Olivier Panis	Toyota	M	69	Illegal brake ducts (+1 Lap)^{5}	13	

Notes

- ^4 – Takuma Sato and Gianmaria Bruni started from the pit lane.
- ^5 – Ralf Schumacher, Juan Pablo Montoya, Cristiano da Matta and Olivier Panis originally finished second, fifth, eighth and tenth respectively, were disqualified for an irregularity in the size of their brake ducts.

== Championship standings after the race ==
Drivers' Championship standings

Pos	Driver	Points
1	(Germany) Michael Schumacher	70
2	(Brazil) Rubens Barrichello	54
3	(United Kingdom) Jenson Button	44
4	(Italy) Jarno Trulli	36
5	(Spain) Fernando Alonso	25

Constructors' Championship standings

Pos	Constructor	Points
1	(Italy) Ferrari	124
2	(France) Renault	61
3	(United Kingdom) BAR-Honda	52
4	(United Kingdom) Williams-BMW	36
5	(Switzerland) Sauber-Petronas	15

- Note: Only the top five positions are included for both sets of standings.

Previous race: 2004 European Grand Prix	FIA Formula One World Championship; 2004 season	Next race: 2004 United States Grand Prix
Previous race: 2003 Canadian Grand Prix	Canadian Grand Prix	Next race: 2005 Canadian Grand Prix
