= 2004 Formula One World Championship =

Formula One motor racing championship

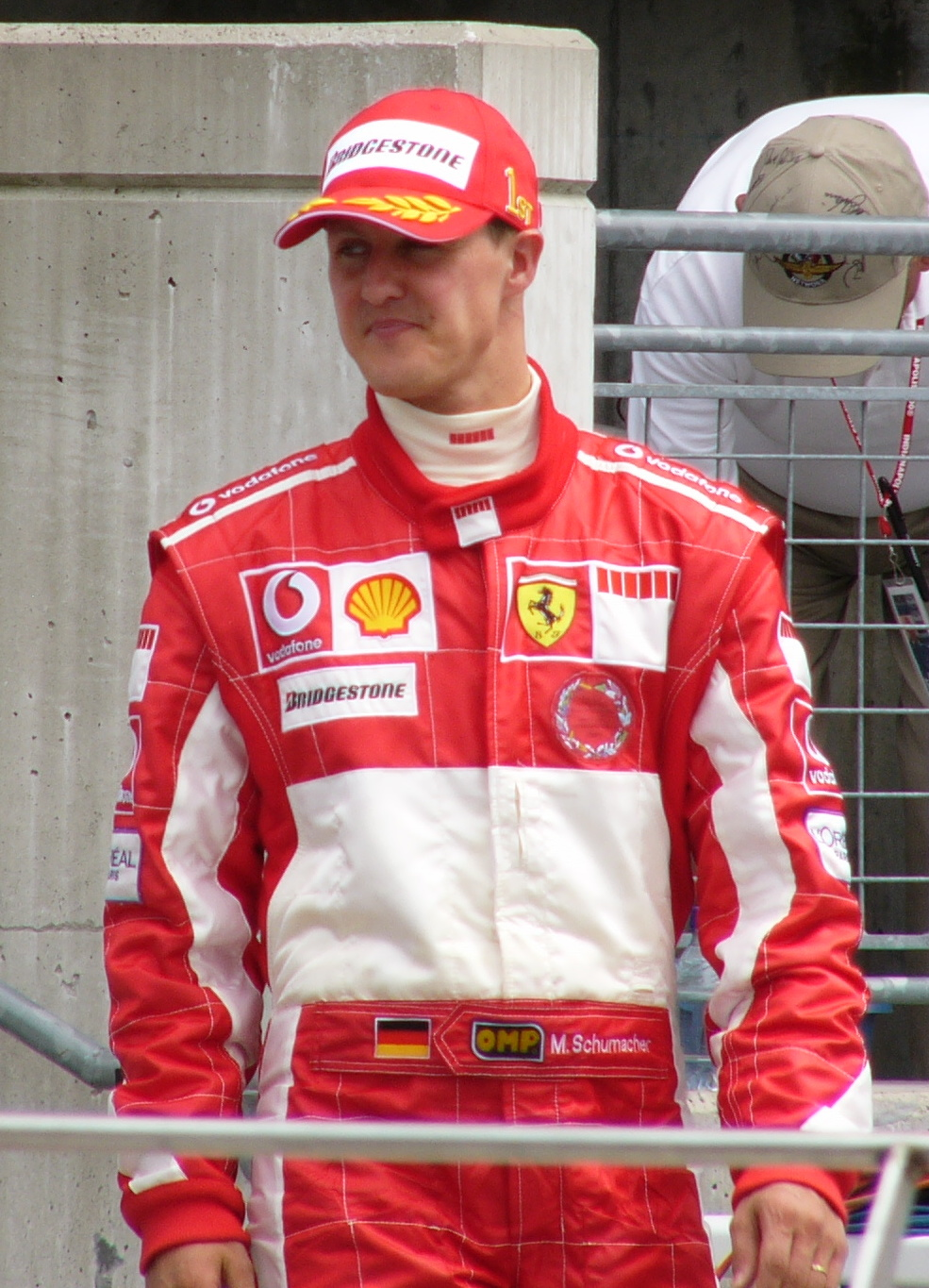
Michael Schumacher (pictured in 2005) won his record-extending seventh and final world title and his fifth consecutive on a then-record 148 points with Ferrari.

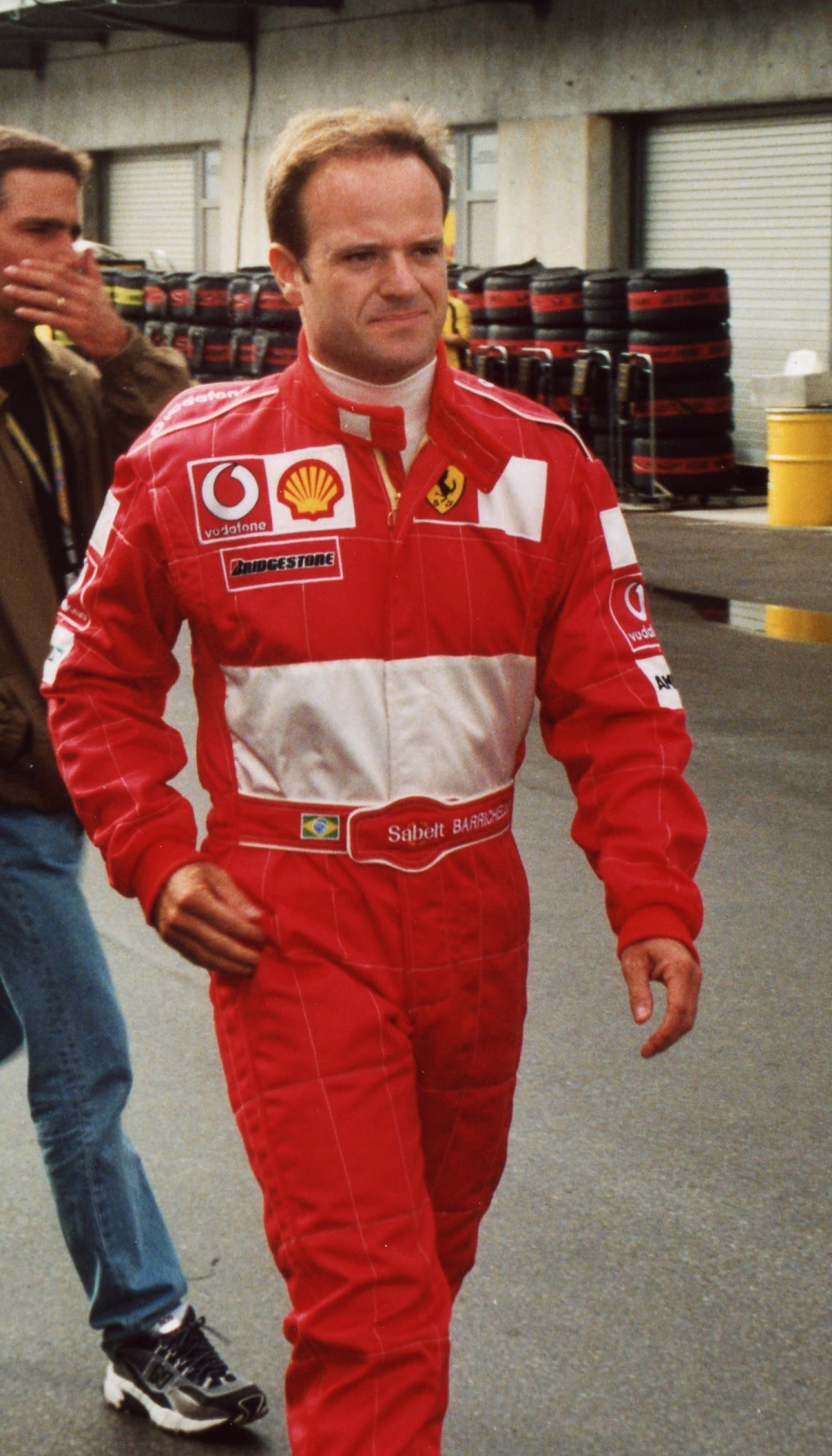
Schumacher's teammate Rubens Barrichello (pictured in 2002) finished second, 34 points behind.

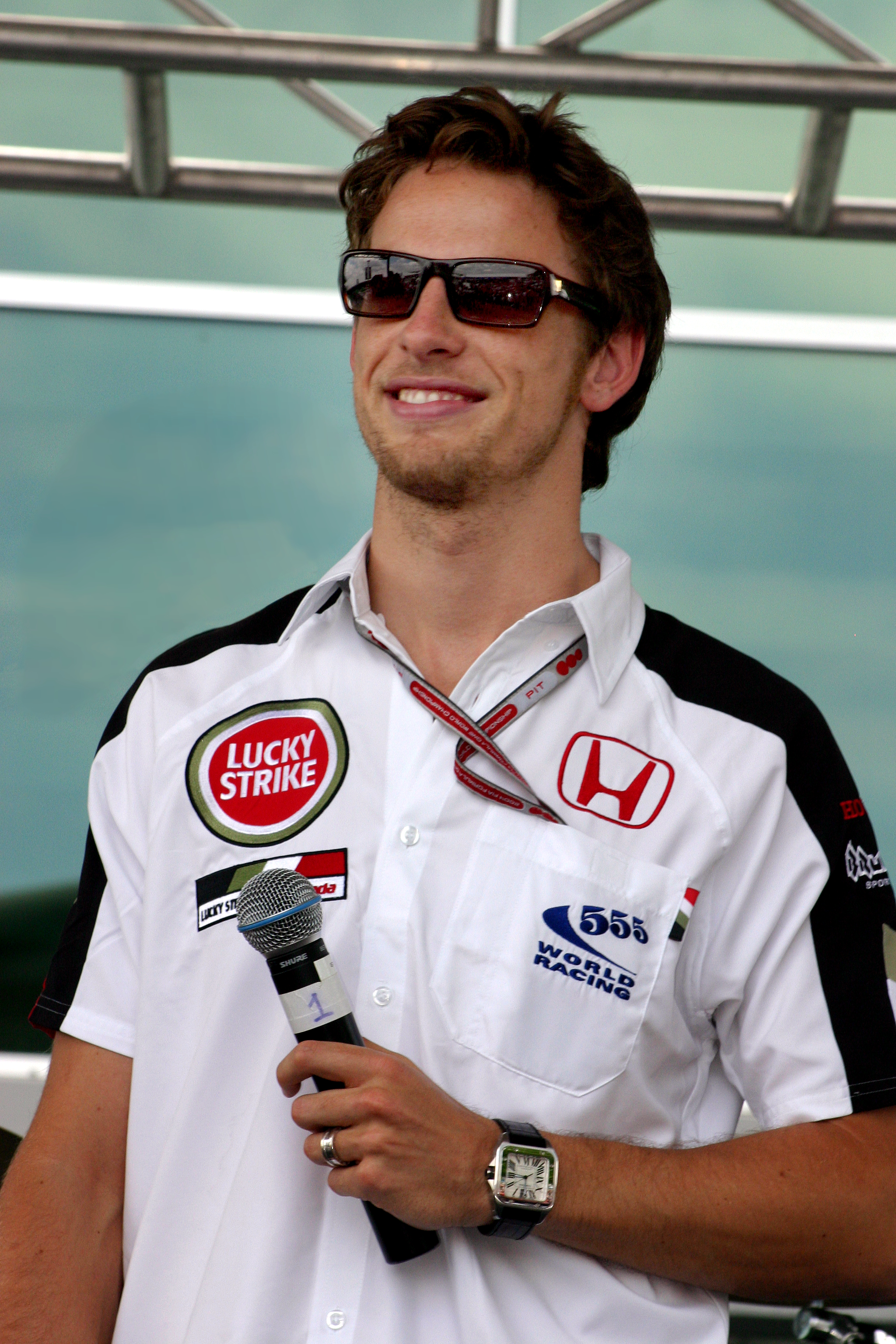
Jenson Button impressed with 85 points and third place in the Championship for BAR-Honda.

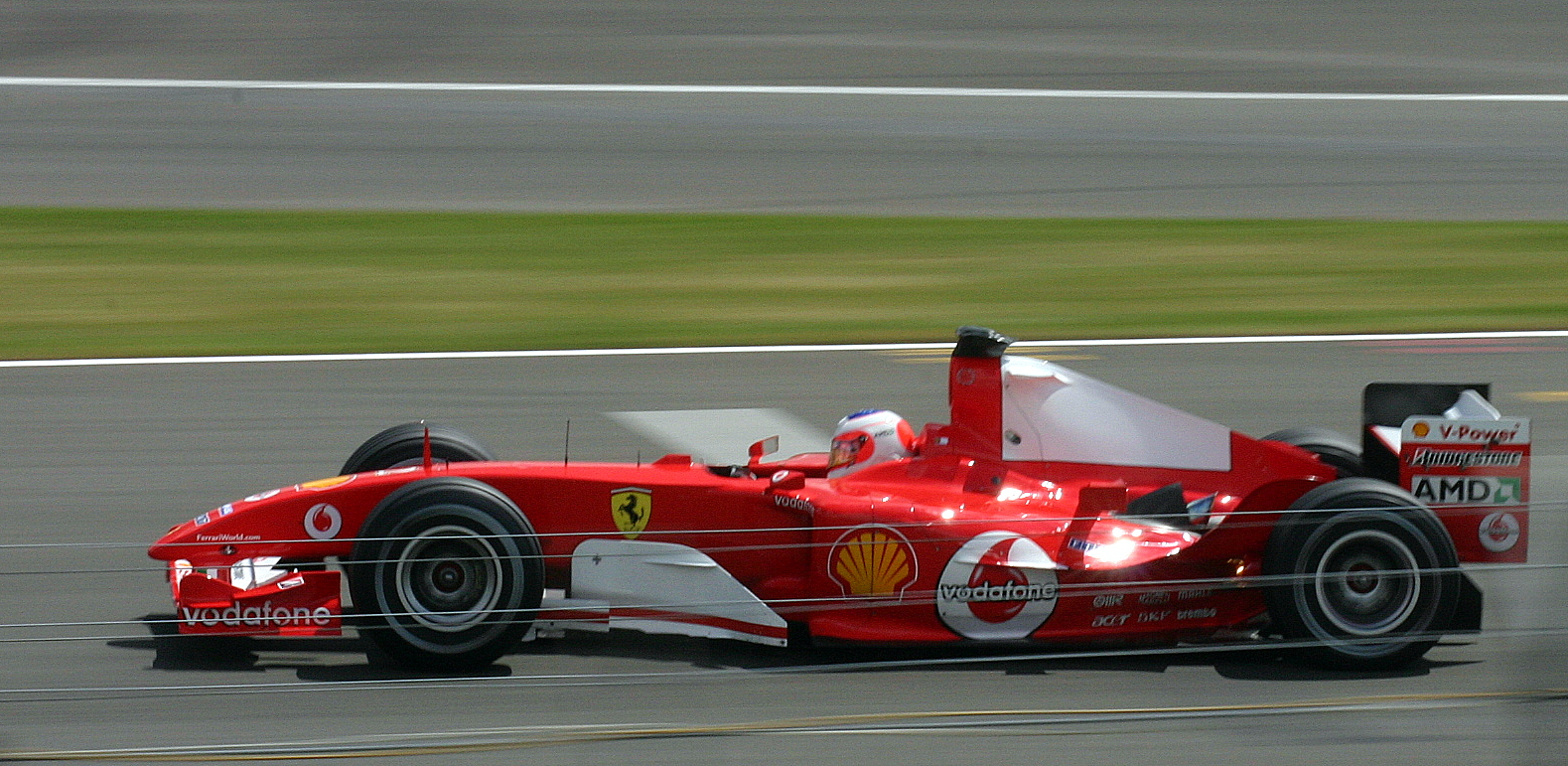
Ferrari won the Constructors' Championship for the fourteenth time, their sixth consecutive title.

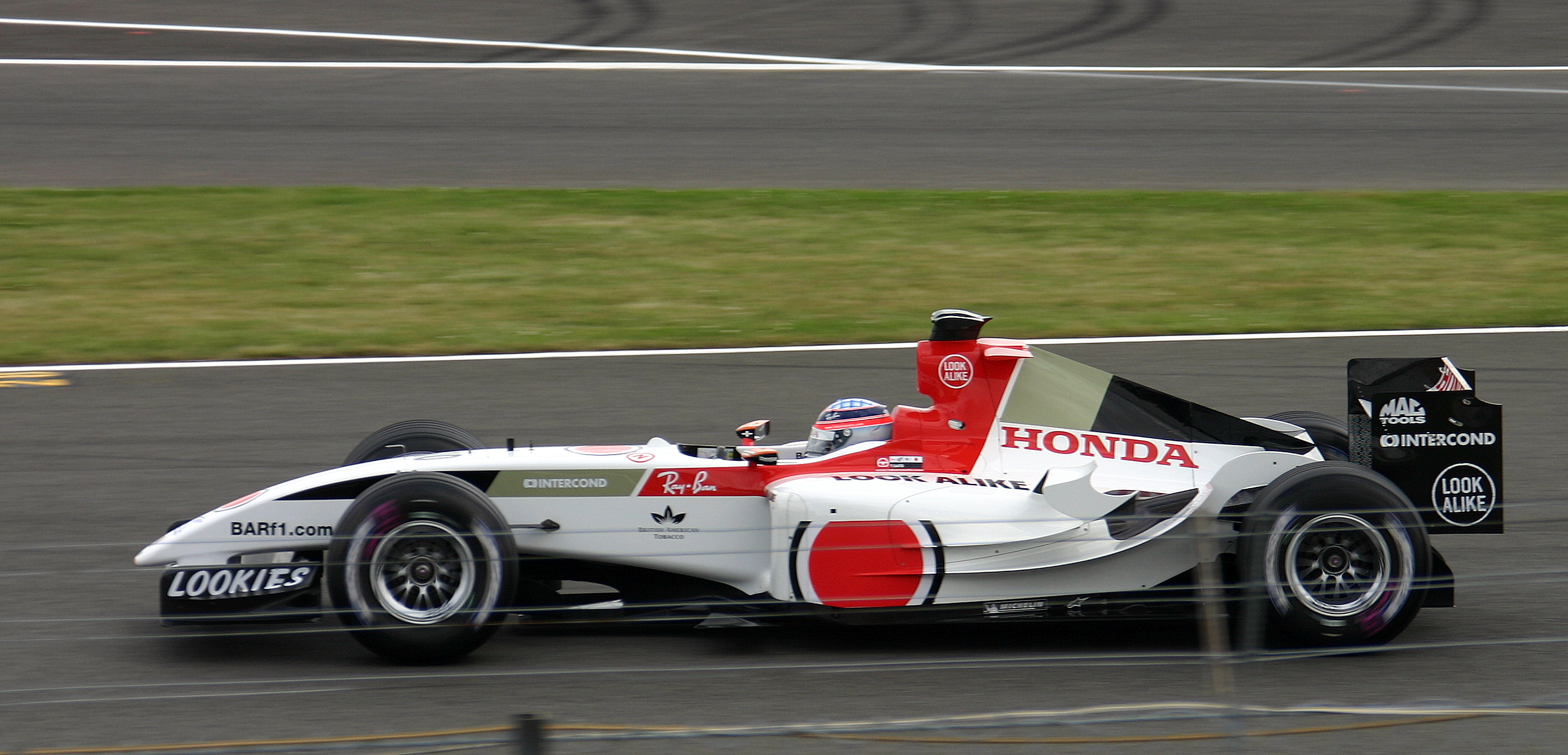
BAR-Honda placed second in the Constructors' Championship.

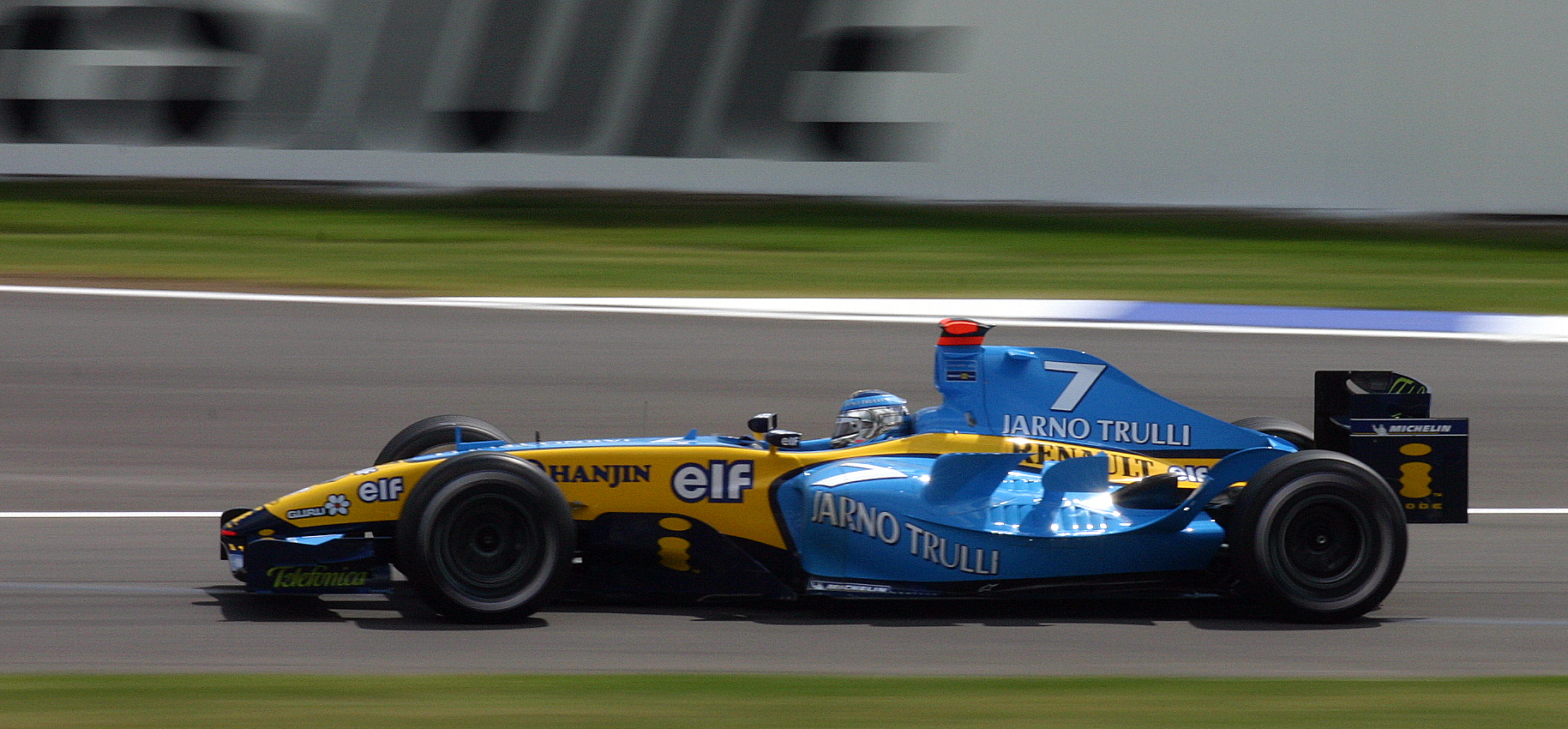
Renault finished third in the Constructors' Championship, 14 points behind BAR-Honda.

The 2004 FIA Formula One World Championship was the 58th season of FIA Formula One motor racing. It was the 55th FIA Formula One World Championship, and was contested over eighteen races from 7 March to 24 October 2004.

The championship was dominated by Michael Schumacher and Ferrari, with Schumacher winning the Drivers' Championship for the seventh and final time. Schumacher's teammate Rubens Barrichello finished the championship in second with Jenson Button coming in third for BAR. Ferrari won the Constructors' Championship for a record 14th time ahead of BAR and Renault.

In this championship, several records were broken. Michael Schumacher won 13 races, breaking his record of 11 race wins in one season from 2002. This record stood until 2013, when his compatriot Sebastian Vettel equalled it before being broken by Max Verstappen in 2022. He also broke the record for most consecutive World Drivers' titles (5) and Ferrari broke the record for most consecutive Constructors' titles (6).

As of 2026, this season was the last title for Bridgestone tyres against competition to date.

== Teams and drivers ==
The following teams and drivers competed in the 2004 FIA Formula One World Championship.

Entrant	Constructor	Chassis	Engine^{†}	Tyre	No	Driver	Rounds
(Italy) Scuderia Ferrari Marlboro	Ferrari	F2004	Ferrari Tipo 053	B	1	(Germany) Michael Schumacher	All
(Italy) Scuderia Ferrari Marlboro	Ferrari	F2004	Ferrari Tipo 053	B	2	(Brazil) Rubens Barrichello	All
(United Kingdom) BMW WilliamsF1 Team	Williams-BMW	FW26	BMW P84	M	3	(Colombia) Juan Pablo Montoya	All
(United Kingdom) BMW WilliamsF1 Team	Williams-BMW	FW26	BMW P84	M	4	(Germany) Ralf Schumacher	1–9, 16–18
(United Kingdom) BMW WilliamsF1 Team	Williams-BMW	FW26	BMW P84	M	4	(Spain) Marc Gené	10–11
(United Kingdom) BMW WilliamsF1 Team	Williams-BMW	FW26	BMW P84	M	4	(Brazil) Antônio Pizzonia	12–15
(United Kingdom) West McLaren Mercedes	McLaren-Mercedes	MP4-19; MP4-19B	Mercedes FO 110Q	M	5	(United Kingdom) David Coulthard	All
(United Kingdom) West McLaren Mercedes	McLaren-Mercedes	MP4-19; MP4-19B	Mercedes FO 110Q	M	6	(Finland) Kimi Räikkönen	All
(France) Mild Seven Renault F1 Team	Renault	R24; R24B	Renault RS24	M	7	(Italy) Jarno Trulli	1–15
(France) Mild Seven Renault F1 Team	Renault	R24; R24B	Renault RS24	M	7	(Canada) Jacques Villeneuve	16–18
(France) Mild Seven Renault F1 Team	Renault	R24; R24B	Renault RS24	M	8	(Spain) Fernando Alonso	All
(United Kingdom) Lucky Strike BAR Honda	BAR-Honda	006	Honda RA004E	M	9	(United Kingdom) Jenson Button	All
(United Kingdom) Lucky Strike BAR Honda	BAR-Honda	006	Honda RA004E	M	10	(Japan) Takuma Sato	All
(Switzerland) Sauber Petronas	Sauber-Petronas	C23	Petronas 04A	B	11	(Italy) Giancarlo Fisichella	All
(Switzerland) Sauber Petronas	Sauber-Petronas	C23	Petronas 04A	B	12	(Brazil) Felipe Massa	All
(United Kingdom) HSBC Jaguar Racing	Jaguar-Cosworth	R5; R5B	Cosworth CR-6	M	14	(Australia) Mark Webber	All
(United Kingdom) HSBC Jaguar Racing	Jaguar-Cosworth	R5; R5B	Cosworth CR-6	M	15	(Austria) Christian Klien	All
(Japan) Panasonic Toyota Racing	Toyota	TF104; TF104B	Toyota RVX-04	M	16	(Brazil) Cristiano da Matta	1–12
(Japan) Panasonic Toyota Racing	Toyota	TF104; TF104B	Toyota RVX-04	M	16	(Brazil) Ricardo Zonta	13–16
(Japan) Panasonic Toyota Racing	Toyota	TF104; TF104B	Toyota RVX-04	M	16	(Italy) Jarno Trulli	17–18
(Japan) Panasonic Toyota Racing	Toyota	TF104; TF104B	Toyota RVX-04	M	17	(France) Olivier Panis	1–17
(Japan) Panasonic Toyota Racing	Toyota	TF104; TF104B	Toyota RVX-04	M	17	(Brazil) Ricardo Zonta	18
(Republic of Ireland) Jordan Ford	Jordan-Ford	EJ14	Ford RS2	B	18	(Germany) Nick Heidfeld	All
(Republic of Ireland) Jordan Ford	Jordan-Ford	EJ14	Ford RS2	B	19	(Italy) Giorgio Pantano (Note: Giorgio Pantano was entered into the Canadian Grand Prix, but later withdrew due to personal circumstances.)	1–15
(Republic of Ireland) Jordan Ford	Jordan-Ford	EJ14	Ford RS2	B	19	(Germany) Timo Glock	8, 16–18
(Italy) Minardi Cosworth (Note: Minardi entered first twelve Grands Prix as "Wilux Minardi Cosworth".)	Minardi-Cosworth	PS04B	Cosworth CR-3L	B	20	(Italy) Gianmaria Bruni	All
(Italy) Minardi Cosworth	Minardi-Cosworth	PS04B	Cosworth CR-3L	B	21	(Hungary) Zsolt Baumgartner	All

^{†} All engines were 3.0 litre, V10 configuration.

Four of the ten teams, Ferrari, Renault, Jaguar, and Toyota, were subsidiaries of major car companies. However, BAR was a division of British American Tobacco. Williams and McLaren, both privately owned teams, had engine supply agreements with BMW and Mercedes-Benz respectively, and Honda produced engines for BAR.

The other three teams, Jordan, Sauber and Minardi, were also privately owned but received little substantial sponsorship and consequently tended to end up toward the back of the grid. Sauber received Ferrari engines badged under the Petronas name and received sponsorship from the Malaysian oil and gas company.

=== Free practice drivers ===
Five constructors entered free practice only drivers over the course of the season.

Drivers that took part in free practice sessions
Constructor	Practice drivers		
Constructor	No.	Driver name	Rounds
BAR–Honda	35	(United Kingdom) Anthony Davidson	All
Jaguar–Cosworth	37	(Sweden) Björn Wirdheim	All
Toyota	38	(Brazil) Ricardo Zonta (Australia) Ryan Briscoe	1–12; 13–18
Jordan–Ford	39	(Germany) Timo Glock (Netherlands) Robert Doornbos	1–15; 16–18
Minardi–Cosworth	40	(Belgium) Bas Leinders	All^{1}

^1 – Leinders was entered as third driver for Round 1 but was refused a FIA Super Licence until he completed the required mileage in a Formula One car. He satisfied this requirement before the next race.

=== Driver changes ===
- The 2004 season featured several driver line-up changes prior to the season, and more changes during the season proper. Minardi, Jordan, and Sauber started 2004 with completely new driver line-ups.
- At BAR, following Jacques Villeneuve's departure from the team before the 2003 Japanese Grand Prix, former test driver Takuma Sato was permanently given the second race seat alongside Jenson Button; after serving in a temporary capacity during 2003, Anthony Davidson became the permanent test driver replacing Takuma Sato.
- At Minardi, Nicolas Kiesa was unable to keep his seat and was released. Jos Verstappen left Minardi as a result of sponsorship problems and an unwillingness to spend another year competing with other backmarkers in the non-competitive team. Gianmaria Bruni, who had performed a limited amount of testing in 2003, was signed to a full-time drive. Zsolt Baumgartner was confirmed as the second full-time driver after the Hungarian government provided sponsorship; Baumgartner had performed replacement duties at Jordan in 2003 after Ralph Firman suffered injuries from a crash in Hungary. Completing the all-new line-up, Bas Leinders and Tiago Monteiro were signed as test drivers for 2004. Leinders was signed from the ranks of the World Series by Nissan, while Monteiro was signed from the American Fittipaldi Champ Car team.
- Heinz-Harald Frentzen and Sauber mutually parted ways at the end of 2003. Frentzen then moved out of F1 and joined fellow ex-F1 drivers Mika Häkkinen and Jean Alesi in the DTM. Nick Heidfeld was also released by Sauber, and appeared to have no drive for 2004. However several successful test drives at Jordan landed him a seat there. Fisichella left Jordan after 2003 having signed a drive for Sauber. This meant that Heidfeld and Fisichella effectively swapped seats. Sauber's other new driver was Felipe Massa, who left his test position at Ferrari and returned to the team where he had raced in 2002. As Sauber used Ferrari engines in 2003, Massa took considerable knowledge of Ferrari components with him.
- Choosing not to extend Justin Wilson's contract, Jaguar signed Christian Klien to partner Mark Webber in the R5. Wilson turned down a test drive and departed Jaguar to join the Mi-Jack Conquest Racing team in Champ Car racing in America. Björn Wirdheim was signed as their Friday test driver. The other Friday test drivers are Franck Montagny, who was rewarded for a championship year in the World Series by Nissan with a permanent test drive at Renault, Ryan Briscoe, who joined Ricardo Zonta as a test driver at Toyota, and Pedro de la Rosa, who returned to F1 as a test driver for McLaren.

==== Mid-season changes ====
- Giorgio Pantano was replaced by Timo Glock at the Canadian Grand Prix. Pantano left Jordan after the Italian Grand Prix, with Glock replacing him again for the remainder of the season.
- After Ralf Schumacher was injured during the United States Grand Prix, Marc Gené replaced him at the French and British Grands Prix. Antônio Pizzonia then replaced him from the German Grand Prix to the Italian Grand Prix. Schumacher returned for the Chinese Grand Prix.
- Cristiano da Matta was replaced by test driver Ricardo Zonta from the Hungarian Grand Prix onward. Zonta was dropped by Toyota for the Japanese Grand Prix before replacing Olivier Panis at the Brazilian Grand Prix, who stepped down from his race seat and retired from the sport.
- Jarno Trulli's relationship with the Renault team deteriorated after his first victory at the 2004 Monaco Grand Prix. He left the team after the 2004 Italian Grand Prix, which was also Pantano's last race for the Jordan team. Former world champion Jacques Villeneuve replaced Jarno Trulli at Renault for the final three races. Trulli missed the 2004 Chinese Grand Prix, but he returned in the 2004 Japanese Grand Prix and the 2004 Brazilian Grand Prix with the Toyota team. That meant the 2004 Japanese Grand Prix was Jarno Trulli's first race with the new team.

=== Team changes ===
- As part of a global restructuring and cost-cutting exercise, Ford announced during the season that they would not be entering into the F1 championship in 2005 via their Jaguar team. They also announced that their Cosworth motor and engineering divisions were being sold. The Jaguar team was eventually bought by Red Bull and continued to compete under the Red Bull Racing name in 2005.

== Regulation changes ==
From the 2004 season onward, all the teams that did not finish in the top four in the previous year's Constructors' Championship were allowed to run a third car in the Friday practice session before each Grand Prix, for testing purposes. While other teams were permitted to have test drivers, they were not allowed to compete in the Friday practice. Sauber chose not to run its third driver in these sessions because of the added expense.

Qualifying was held entirely on Saturday and divided into two sessions, in each of which the driver was only allowed to complete one fast lap. In the first session, the drivers started in the order in which they finished the previous race (in the first race, the order was chosen according to the 2003 World Championship standings). This served to determine the order for the second session, which then determined the starting positions for the race. The second session took place directly after the first. The drivers drove in the reverse order of the first qualifying session. The warm-up on Sunday was abolished.

The 2004 season also saw a change in technical regulations, including banning fully-automatic gearboxes and launch control, both of which had been used for the past three seasons. 2004 was the first time since the beginning of 2001 (pre-Spanish Grand Prix) that cars competed without these systems. However, the use of traction control was still permitted by the FIA, and continued to be allowed for use over the next three seasons, until it was banned for the 2008 season.

To reduce costs, a rule was introduced that each engine must last the entire race weekend. If an engine needs to be replaced during the weekend, the driver will be penalized by a ten-place grid penalty.

The speed limit in the pit lane was increased from 80 km/h to 100 km/h. However, in some cases this was waived for safety reasons.

== Calendar ==
The 2004 Formula One calendar featured two new events: the Bahrain Grand Prix and the Chinese Grand Prix, held at two newly built circuits in Sakhir and Shanghai. The season featured the most races outside Europe to that point; eight Grands Prix were held in the Americas, Asia, and Oceania. The Brazilian Grand Prix moved from its traditional early season slot to become the season finale, whereas the United States Grand Prix moved from its previous date in late September to late June as a back-to-back race with the Canadian Grand Prix.

The only exit was the Austrian Grand Prix, after seven years of racing at the A1-Ring, the modified circuit old Österreichring. The grandstands and pit buildings were demolished during the year, rendering the track unusable for any motorsport category. The circuit eventually reopened in 2011 as the Red Bull Ring and was later reinstated to the F1 calendar in 2014.

Round	Grand Prix	Circuit	Date
1	Australian Grand Prix	(Australia) Albert Park Circuit, Melbourne	7 March
2	Malaysian Grand Prix	(Malaysia) Sepang International Circuit, Sepang	21 March
3	Bahrain Grand Prix	Bahrain International Circuit, Sakhir	4 April
4	San Marino Grand Prix	(Italy) Autodromo Enzo e Dino Ferrari, Imola	25 April
5	Spanish Grand Prix	(Spain) Circuit de Catalunya, Montmeló	9 May
6	Monaco Grand Prix	Circuit de Monaco, Monaco	23 May
7	European Grand Prix	(Germany) Nürburgring, Nürburg	30 May
8	Canadian Grand Prix	(Canada) Circuit Gilles Villeneuve, Montreal	13 June
9	United States Grand Prix	(United States) Indianapolis Motor Speedway, Speedway	20 June
10	French Grand Prix	(France) Circuit de Nevers Magny-Cours, Magny Cours	4 July
11	British Grand Prix	(United Kingdom) Silverstone Circuit, Silverstone	11 July
12	German Grand Prix	(Germany) Hockenheimring, Hockenheim	25 July
13	Hungarian Grand Prix	(Hungary) Hungaroring, Mogyoród	15 August
14	Belgian Grand Prix	(Belgium) Circuit de Spa-Francorchamps, Stavelot	29 August
15	Italian Grand Prix	(Italy) Autodromo Nazionale di Monza, Monza	12 September
16	Chinese Grand Prix	(China) Shanghai International Circuit, Shanghai	26 September
17	Japanese Grand Prix	(Japan) Suzuka Circuit, Suzuka	10 October
18	Brazilian Grand Prix	(Brazil) Autódromo José Carlos Pace, São Paulo	24 October

== Season report ==
=== Opening rounds ===
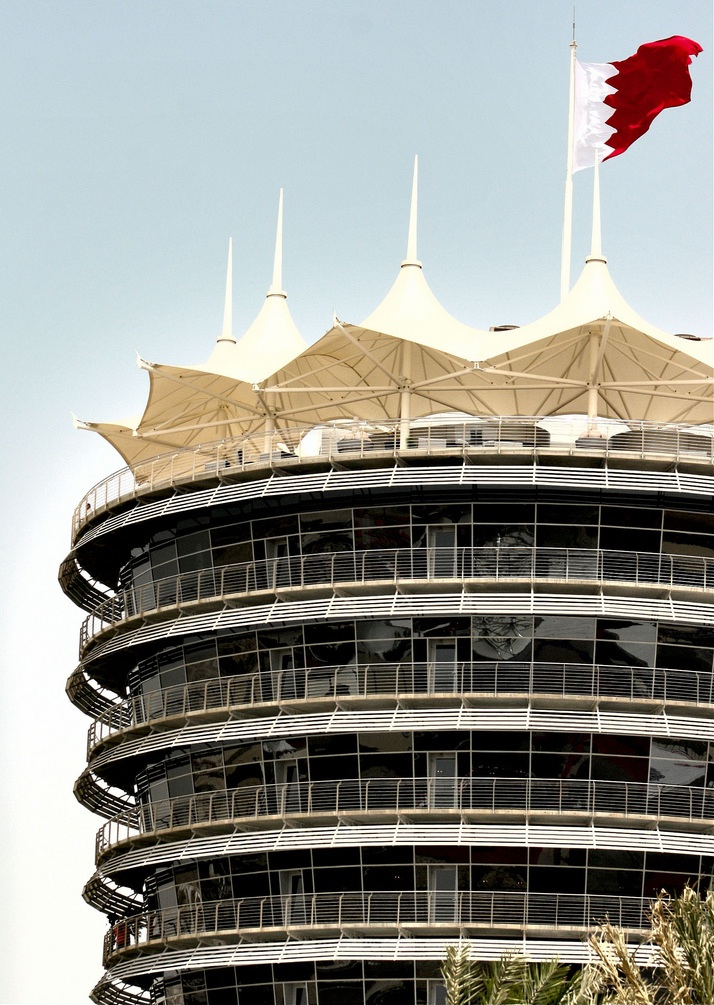
The Bahrain Grand Prix was Formula One's inaugural visit to the Middle East.

Ferrari dominated the opening weekend at Albert Park in Australia, comfortably locking out the front row in qualifying and earning a 1–2 in the race. Michael Schumacher set the fastest lap of the race on his way to a lights-to-flag victory, with teammate Rubens Barrichello and Renault's Fernando Alonso joining him on the podium. Schumacher followed that up with another pole and victory at Sepang, finishing ahead of Juan Pablo Montoya and Jenson Button, the British driver scoring his first career podium and the BAR Honda team's best result since the 2001 German Grand Prix. Mark Webber, who split the Ferraris in qualifying in his unfancied Jaguar, suffered a poor start before colliding with Ralf Schumacher and spinning out.

Formula One's first visit to the Arab world since the 1958 Moroccan Grand Prix took place at the Bahrain International Circuit. The Ferrari duo of Schumacher and Barrichello once again finished 1–2 in both qualifying and the race, with Button's second consecutive podium elevating him to third in the Drivers' Championship as the series headed for Europe.

=== European rounds ===
Jenson Button scored his and BAR's maiden pole at the San Marino Grand Prix, but Michael Schumacher, after having a controversial moment with BMW Williams driver Juan Pablo Montoya, overtook Button on the eighth lap and finished nearly ten seconds ahead. Button and Juan Pablo Montoya completed the rostrum—the latter beating Fernando Alonso to the line by just two seconds—while Kimi Räikkönen recorded his first finish of the season in eighth, using a two-stop strategy to claim the final point from last on the grid. Despite suffering from a defective exhaust, Schumacher dominated the Spanish Grand Prix as well, as front-row starter Montoya retired with brake problems and early leader Jarno Trulli took third behind Rubens Barrichello.

At the Monaco Grand Prix, Trulli scored his first career victory from pole after surviving intense pressure from Jenson Button. Rubens Barrichello in third was the only other driver on the lead lap, albeit more than a minute behind the leaders. Teammate Schumacher was one of several front-runners who retired, the championship leader's five-win streak ending after a collision with Juan Pablo Montoya under the safety car. That safety car period was necessitated by Fernando Alonso, who slammed the barrier on lap 42 while attempting to lap the Williams of Ralf Schumacher in the tunnel. Earlier in the race, a fast-starting Takuma Sato suffered a spectacular engine failure on the third lap at the Tabac corner; the smoke from the rear of his BAR machine blinded the queue behind him, causing Giancarlo Fisichella to mount the back of David Coulthard's McLaren and flip over. Olivier Panis stalled as the race was due to begin, shortening the race to 77 laps as the remaining drivers completed a second formation lap. Panis later recovered to eighth place as he and sixth-placed Cristiano da Matta scored Toyota's first points of the season.

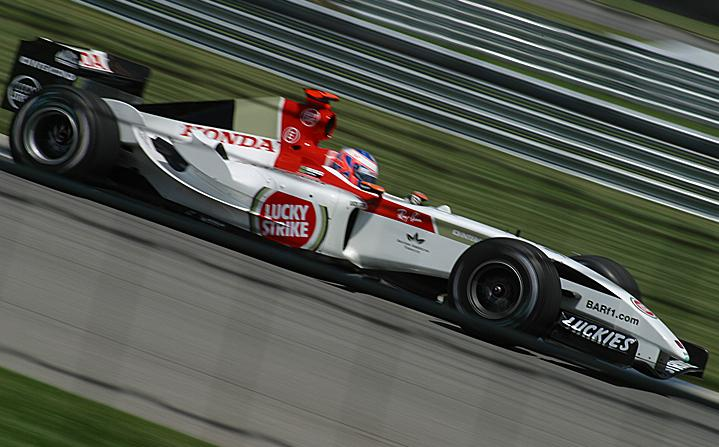
Jenson Button scored his first pole and ten podiums en route to third in the Drivers' Championship.

Michael Schumacher returned to his winning ways by leading the majority of the European Grand Prix at the Nürburgring, with Barrichello and Button following him home in second and third. Ralf Schumacher, meanwhile, collided with da Matta at the start, causing both cars to retire from the race. Front-row starter and one-time leader Sato joined the list of retirements with a late engine failure, as did the McLaren duo of Räikkönen and Coulthard, both of whose Mercedes engines expired at the manufacturer's home race.

=== North American doubleheader and return to Europe ===
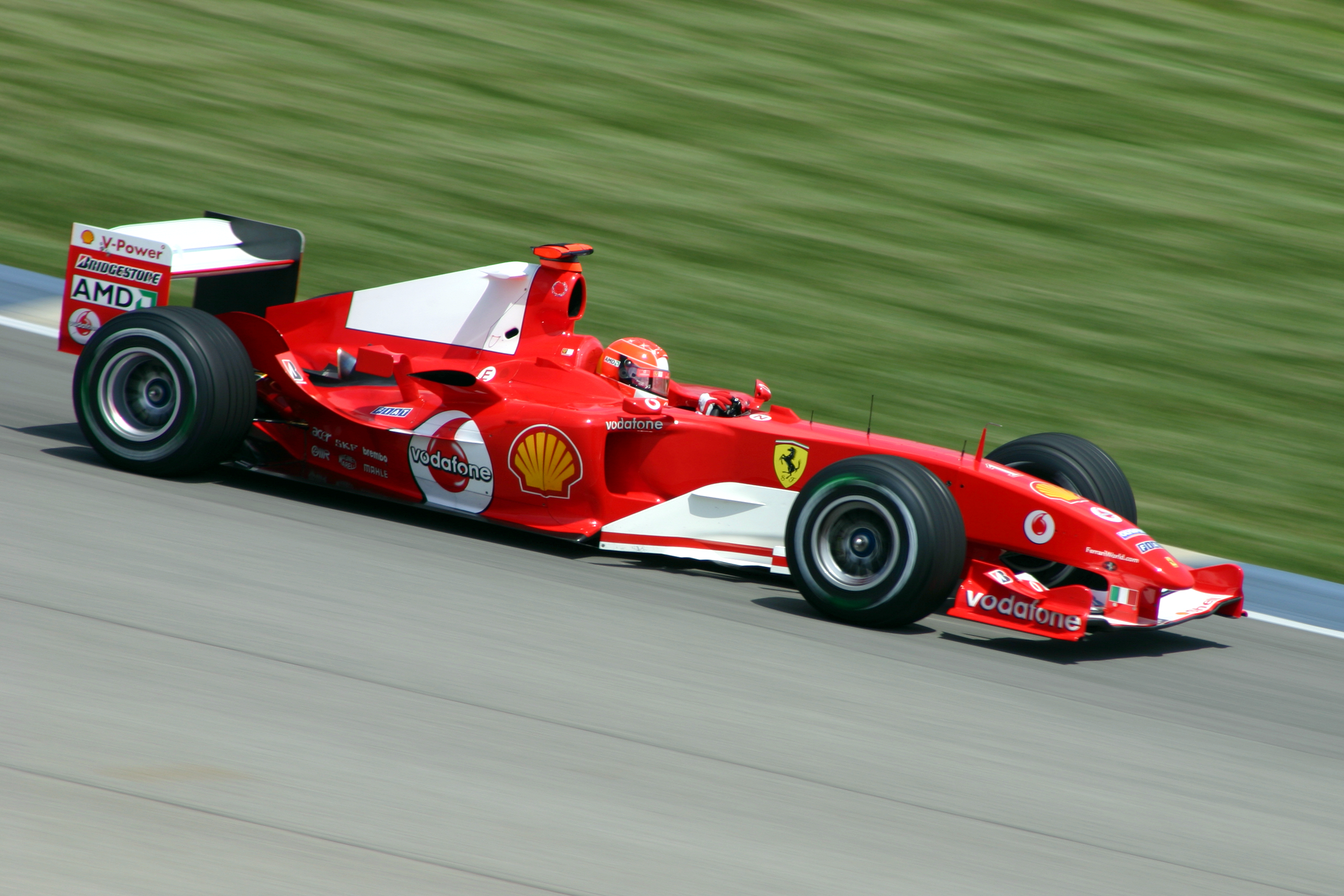
Michael Schumacher won twelve of the first thirteen races in 2004.

At the Canadian Grand Prix, Timo Glock replaced Giorgio Pantano at Jordan for financial reasons. Ralf Schumacher qualified on pole position, joined by Jenson Button on the front row, with Michael Schumacher only starting from sixth. After a series of lead changes, the elder Schumacher ultimately crossed the line first, followed by his brother and Rubens Barrichello. But the Williams of Ralf Schumacher—along with his fifth-placed teammate Juan Pablo Montoya and the Toyotas of Cristiano da Matta and Olivier Panis in eighth and tenth—would later be excluded from the results due to an irregularity in the brake ducts, promoting Barrichello to second and Button to third. The McLaren and Jordan teams were also beneficiaries of the four disqualifications, with Glock—in his Formula One début—and Nick Heidfeld both scoring points.

Barrichello qualified on pole for the United States Grand Prix, with Michael Schumacher alongside him. Schumacher would go on to win once more as Barrichello and Takuma Sato—scoring his first and only Formula One podium—completed the top three. It was a race dominated by accidents, however, beginning with a first-lap incident that eliminated Gianmaria Bruni, Giorgio Pantano, Felipe Massa and Christian Klien. On the ninth lap, Fernando Alonso suffered a puncture and crashed at the end of the start-finish straight, with Ralf Schumacher crashing at the oval section for the same reason on the following lap. Schumacher suffered a concussion and fractured vertebrae in that final-corner accident, which kept him out of the following six races. Thanks to the high attrition rate, only eight cars crossed the line; the final finisher was Zsolt Baumgartner, who became Hungary's first points scorer and earned the Minardi team their first point since 2002.

In France, Michael Schumacher beat Alonso with a clever four-stop strategy. Barrichello overtook the second Renault of Jarno Trulli on the final corner of the race to snatch third place, while Marc Gené, who replaced the injured Ralf Schumacher at Williams for the French and British Grands Prix, finished tenth. Michael Schumacher overpowered polesitter Kimi Räikkönen to take his tenth win of the season at Silverstone. Räikkönen, who finished second, bagged McLaren's first podium in 2004, ahead of Barrichello in third. The race was notable for Jarno Trulli's massive accident, the Italian losing control of his car at Bridge and hitting the tyre barrier before rolling in the gravel trap.

Schumacher won from pole at the German Grand Prix, beating Jenson Button—who started thirteenth after a ten-place penalty for an engine change—and Fernando Alonso. Front-row starter Juan Pablo Montoya could only manage a fifth-place finish, while his new teammate Antônio Pizzonia finished seventh. After setting the fastest lap of the race, Kimi Räikkönen suffered a high-speed rear wing failure at the end of the start-finish straight on lap 14 and crashed into the tyre wall.

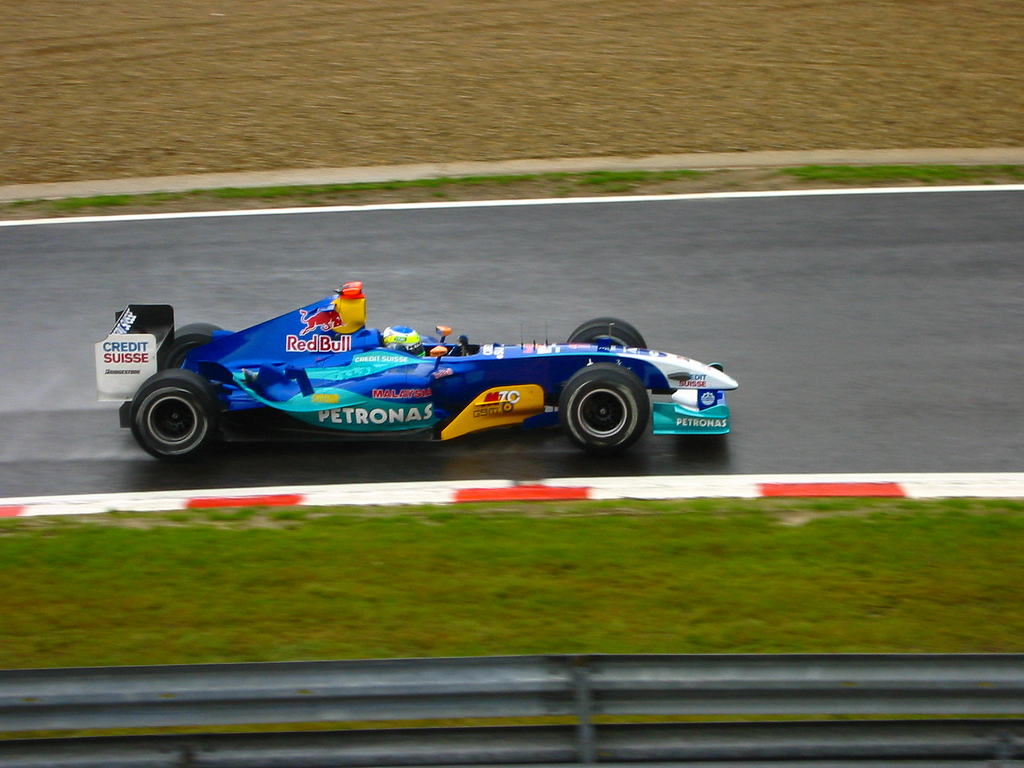
Felipe Massa and Giancarlo Fisichella (pictured) finished fourth and fifth for Sauber in Belgium.

A string of disappointing results from Toyota's Cristiano da Matta led to his replacement by test driver Ricardo Zonta from the Hungarian Grand Prix onward. There, Schumacher led another Ferrari 1–2 in both qualifying and the race to secure Ferrari the Constructors' trophy, with the race's 2003 winner Alonso completing the podium.

The Belgian Grand Prix also included numerous accidents and safety car periods. A first-lap collision between Mark Webber and Takuma Sato eliminated both of them; Zsolt Baumgartner avoided the initial wreckage but knocked teammate Gianmaria Bruni's car into the wall, which then bounced back and collected Giorgio Pantano. On the thirtieth lap, Jenson Button suffered a right-rear puncture and lost control of his car, crashing into the Minardi of Zsolt Baumgartner that he was attempting to lap. Kimi Räikkönen eventually won the race, his first of the year, from a lowly 10th place on the grid. Michael Schumacher finished second and thus secured himself the world title, as his forty-point gap to Rubens Barrichello—who finished the race third—was by that point insurmountable.

=== Concluding rounds and Brazilian finale ===
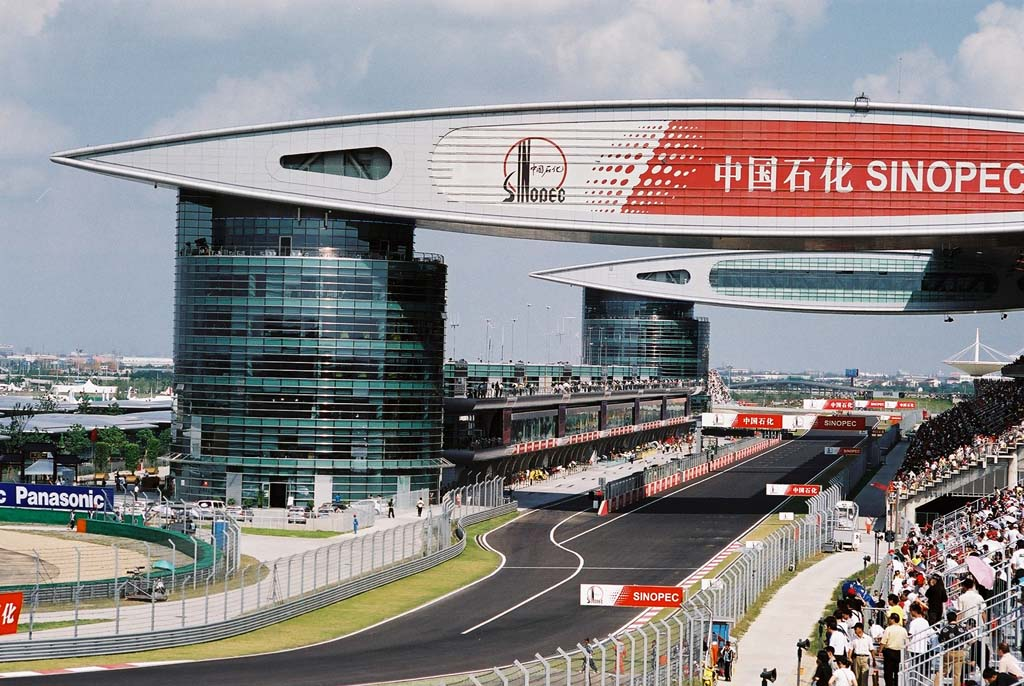
The start-finish straight at the Shanghai International Circuit.

At the Italian Grand Prix, Barrichello led a Ferrari 1–2 in front of the loyal Tifosi, although Schumacher, who started third, spun off on the first lap and had to rejoin the race at the back of the field. Following the race, Jarno Trulli parted ways with Renault, with 1997 world champion Jacques Villeneuve returning to Formula One as his replacement. Immediately before the Chinese Grand Prix, fellow Italian Giorgio Pantano was dropped by the Jordan team and replaced once more by Timo Glock for the last three races. That race was also won by Barrichello from pole, with Button and Räikkönen less than 2 seconds behind. Michael Schumacher started from the pit lane and could only make it to 12th place following several mistakes and a puncture, while a returning Ralf Schumacher retired with suspension damage.

The Japanese Grand Prix weekend was affected by Typhoon Ma-on, which caused widespread damage to parts of Japan and saw the postponement of qualifying to the morning of race day. With the rain dying down in time for the race, Michael Schumacher took his 13th win from pole, with his brother Ralf starting and finishing second and Jenson Button completing the podium. A collision between David Coulthard and Rubens Barrichello—who set the fastest lap of the race—eliminated both of them from the Grand Prix. Following his acrimonious split from Renault, Jarno Trulli finished eleventh in his first race for Toyota, while his teammate Olivier Panis retired from the sport after the race.

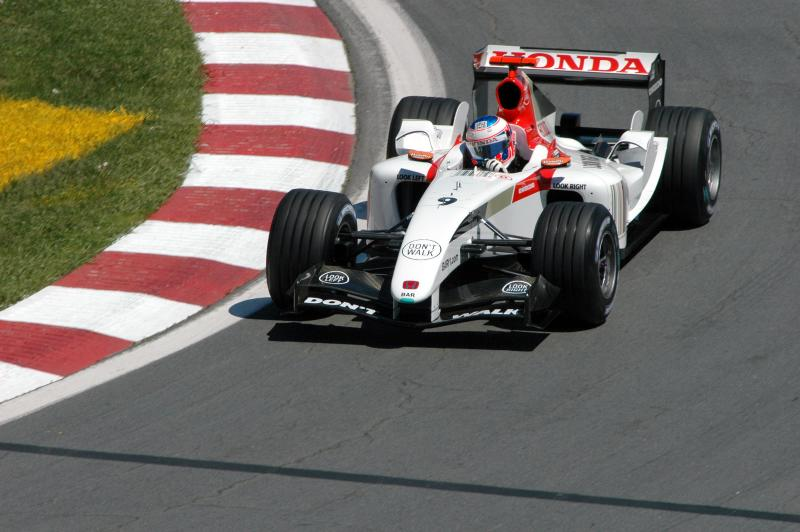
BAR-Honda placed a career best second in the Constructors' Championship.

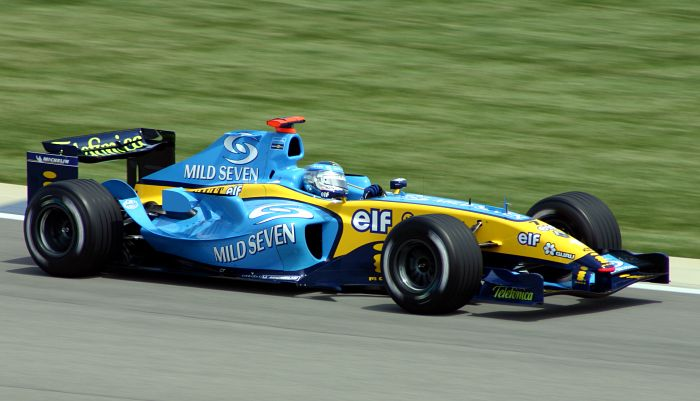
Renault placed third in the Constructors' Championship.

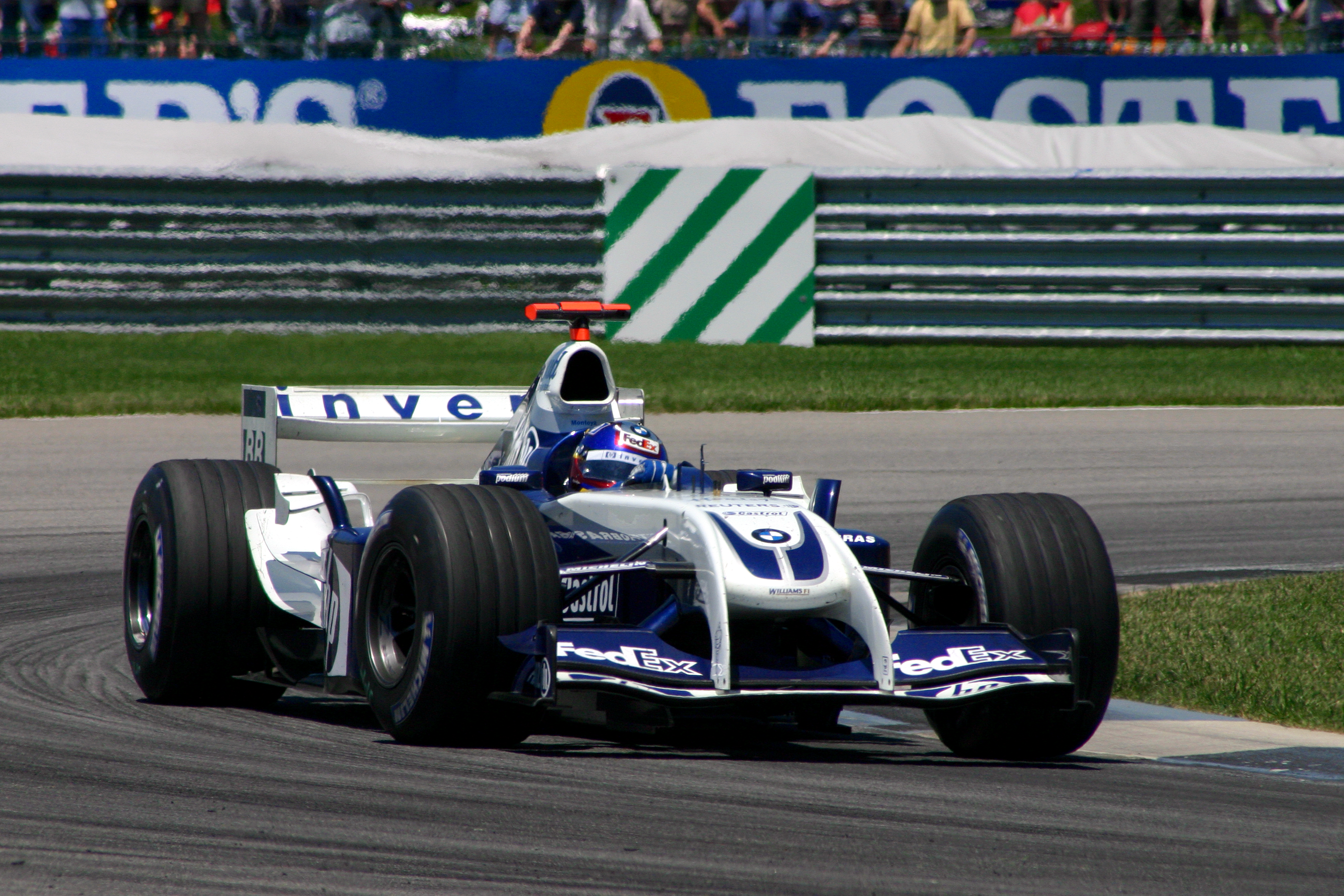
Williams-BMW placed fourth in the Constructors' Championship.

The Brazilian Grand Prix was won by Juan Pablo Montoya—who also set the fastest lap—from second on the grid, with his soon-to-be McLaren teammate Kimi Räikkönen and polesitter Barrichello finishing behind him. It was Montoya's last outing for Williams and the team's last victory until the 2012 Spanish Grand Prix. It was also the final race for Minardi duo Zsolt Baumgartner and Gianmaria Bruni and the Jaguar team's last entry before they were bought by Red Bull. David Coulthard finished his last season with McLaren (the team he had been with since 1996) without a podium finish during the season.

== Results and standings ==
=== Grands Prix ===
Round	Grand Prix	Pole position	Fastest lap	Winning driver	Winning constructor	Report
1	(Australia) Australian Grand Prix	(Germany) Michael Schumacher	(Germany) Michael Schumacher	(Germany) Michael Schumacher	(Italy) Ferrari	Report
2	(Malaysia) Malaysian Grand Prix	(Germany) Michael Schumacher	(Colombia) Juan Pablo Montoya	(Germany) Michael Schumacher	(Italy) Ferrari	Report
3	Bahrain Grand Prix	(Germany) Michael Schumacher	(Germany) Michael Schumacher	(Germany) Michael Schumacher	(Italy) Ferrari	Report
4	(Italy) San Marino Grand Prix	(United Kingdom) Jenson Button	(Germany) Michael Schumacher	(Germany) Michael Schumacher	(Italy) Ferrari	Report
5	(Spain) Spanish Grand Prix	(Germany) Michael Schumacher	(Germany) Michael Schumacher	(Germany) Michael Schumacher	(Italy) Ferrari	Report
6	Monaco Grand Prix	(Italy) Jarno Trulli	(Germany) Michael Schumacher	(Italy) Jarno Trulli	(France) Renault	Report
7	(Germany) European Grand Prix	(Germany) Michael Schumacher	(Germany) Michael Schumacher	(Germany) Michael Schumacher	(Italy) Ferrari	Report
8	(Canada) Canadian Grand Prix	(Germany) Ralf Schumacher	(Brazil) Rubens Barrichello	(Germany) Michael Schumacher	(Italy) Ferrari	Report
9	United States Grand Prix	(Brazil) Rubens Barrichello	(Brazil) Rubens Barrichello	(Germany) Michael Schumacher	(Italy) Ferrari	Report
10	(France) French Grand Prix	(Spain) Fernando Alonso	(Germany) Michael Schumacher	(Germany) Michael Schumacher	(Italy) Ferrari	Report
11	(United Kingdom) British Grand Prix	(Finland) Kimi Räikkönen	(Germany) Michael Schumacher	(Germany) Michael Schumacher	(Italy) Ferrari	Report
12	(Germany) German Grand Prix	(Germany) Michael Schumacher	(Finland) Kimi Räikkönen	(Germany) Michael Schumacher	(Italy) Ferrari	Report
13	(Hungary) Hungarian Grand Prix	(Germany) Michael Schumacher	(Germany) Michael Schumacher	(Germany) Michael Schumacher	(Italy) Ferrari	Report
14	(Belgium) Belgian Grand Prix	(Italy) Jarno Trulli	(Finland) Kimi Räikkönen	(Finland) Kimi Räikkönen	(United Kingdom) McLaren-Mercedes	Report
15	(Italy) Italian Grand Prix	(Brazil) Rubens Barrichello	(Brazil) Rubens Barrichello	(Brazil) Rubens Barrichello	(Italy) Ferrari	Report
16	(China) Chinese Grand Prix	(Brazil) Rubens Barrichello	(Germany) Michael Schumacher	(Brazil) Rubens Barrichello	(Italy) Ferrari	Report
17	(Japan) Japanese Grand Prix	(Germany) Michael Schumacher	(Brazil) Rubens Barrichello	(Germany) Michael Schumacher	(Italy) Ferrari	Report
18	(Brazil) Brazilian Grand Prix	(Brazil) Rubens Barrichello	(Colombia) Juan Pablo Montoya	(Colombia) Juan Pablo Montoya	(United Kingdom) Williams-BMW	Report

=== Scoring system ===
Points were awarded to the top eight classified finishers.

Position	1st	2nd	3rd	4th	5th	6th	7th	8th
Points	10	8	6	5	4	3	2	1

=== World Drivers' Championship standings ===
Pos.	Driver	AUS (Australia)	MAL (Malaysia)	BHR (Bahrain)	SMR (Italy)	ESP (Spain)	MON (Monaco)	EUR (Germany)	CAN (Canada)	USA (United States)	FRA (France)	GBR (United Kingdom)	GER (Germany)	HUN (Hungary)	BEL (Belgium)	ITA (Italy)	CHN (China)	JPN (Japan)	BRA (Brazil)	Points
1	(Germany) Michael Schumacher	1^{P}^{F}	1^{P}	1^{P}^{F}	1^{F}	1^{P}^{F}	Ret^{F}	1^{P}^{F}	1	1	1^{F}	1^{F}	1^{P}	1^{P}^{F}	2	2	12^{F}	1^{P}	7	148
2	(Brazil) Rubens Barrichello	2	4	2	6	2	3	2	2^{F}	2^{P}^{F}	3	3	12	2	3	1^{P}^{F}	1^{P}	Ret^{F}	3^{P}	114
3	(United Kingdom) Jenson Button	6	3	3	2^{P}	8	2	3	3	Ret	5	4	2	5	Ret	3	2	3	Ret	85
4	(Spain) Fernando Alonso	3	7	6	4	4	Ret	5	Ret	Ret	2^{P}	10	3	3	Ret	Ret	4	5	4	59
5	(Colombia) Juan Pablo Montoya	5	2^{F}	13	3	Ret	4	8	DSQ	DSQ	8	5	5	4	Ret	5	5	7	1^{F}	58
6	(Italy) Jarno Trulli	7	5	4	5	3	1^{P}	4	Ret	4	4	Ret	11	Ret	9^{P}	10		11	12	46
7	(Finland) Kimi Räikkönen	Ret	Ret	Ret	8	11	Ret	Ret	5	6	7	2^{P}	Ret^{F}	Ret	1^{F}	Ret	3	6	2	45
8	(Japan) Takuma Sato	9	15^{†}	5	16^{†}	5	Ret	Ret	Ret	3	Ret	11	8	6	Ret	4	6	4	6	34
9	(Germany) Ralf Schumacher	4	Ret	7	7	6	10^{†}	Ret	DSQ^{P}	Ret							Ret	2	5	24
10	(United Kingdom) David Coulthard	8	6	Ret	12	10	Ret	Ret	6	7	6	7	4	9	7	6	9	Ret	11	24
11	(Italy) Giancarlo Fisichella	10	11	11	9	7	Ret	6	4	9^{†}	12	6	9	8	5	8	7	8	9	22
12	(Brazil) Felipe Massa	Ret	8	12	10	9	5	9	Ret	Ret	13	9	13	Ret	4	12	8	9	8	12
13	(Australia) Mark Webber	Ret	Ret	8	13	12	Ret	7	Ret	Ret	9	8	6	10	Ret	9	10	Ret	Ret	7
14	(France) Olivier Panis	13	12	9	11	Ret	8	11	DSQ	5	15	Ret	14	11	8	Ret	14	14		6
15	(Brazil) Antônio Pizzonia												7	7	Ret	7				6
16	(Austria) Christian Klien	11	10	14	14	Ret	Ret	12	9	Ret	11	14	10	13	6	13	Ret	12	14	3
17	(Brazil) Cristiano da Matta	12	9	10	Ret	13	6	Ret	DSQ	Ret	14	13	Ret							3
18	(Germany) Nick Heidfeld	Ret	Ret	15	Ret	Ret	7	10	8	Ret	16	15	Ret	12	11	14	13	13	Ret	3
19	(Germany) Timo Glock								7								15	15	15	2
20	(Hungary) Zsolt Baumgartner	Ret	16	Ret	15	Ret	9	15	10	8	Ret	Ret	16	15	Ret	15	16	Ret	16	1
21	(Canada) Jacques Villeneuve																11	10	10	0
22	(Brazil) Ricardo Zonta													Ret	10^{†}	11	Ret		13	0
23	(Spain) Marc Gené										10	12								0
24	(Italy) Giorgio Pantano	14	13	16	Ret	Ret	Ret	13	WD	Ret	17	Ret	15	Ret	Ret	Ret				0
25	(Italy) Gianmaria Bruni	NC	14	17	Ret	Ret	Ret	14	Ret	Ret	18^{†}	16	17	14	Ret	Ret	Ret	16	17	0
Pos.	Driver	AUS (Australia)	MAL (Malaysia)	BHR (Bahrain)	SMR (Italy)	ESP (Spain)	MON (Monaco)	EUR (Germany)	CAN (Canada)	USA (United States)	FRA (France)	GBR (United Kingdom)	GER (Germany)	HUN (Hungary)	BEL (Belgium)	ITA (Italy)	CHN (China)	JPN (Japan)	BRA (Brazil)	Points

Key
Colour	Result
Gold	Winner
Silver	Second place
Bronze	Third place
Green	Other points position
Blue	Other classified position
Blue	Not classified, finished (NC)
Purple	Not classified, retired (Ret)
Red	Did not qualify (DNQ)
Black	Disqualified (DSQ)
White	Did not start (DNS)
White	Race cancelled (C)
Blank	Did not practice (DNP)
Blank	Excluded (EX)
Blank	Did not arrive (DNA)
Blank	Withdrawn (WD)
Blank	Did not enter (empty cell)
Annotation	Meaning
P	Pole position
F	Fastest lap

Notes:

- † – Drivers did not finish the Grand Prix, but were classified as they completed more than 90% of the race distance.

=== World Constructors' Championship standings ===
Pos.	Constructor	No.	AUS (Australia)	MAL (Malaysia)	BHR (Bahrain)	SMR (Italy)	ESP (Spain)	MON (Monaco)	EUR (Germany)	CAN (Canada)	USA (United States)	FRA (France)	GBR (United Kingdom)	GER (Germany)	HUN (Hungary)	BEL (Belgium)	ITA (Italy)	CHN (China)	JPN (Japan)	BRA (Brazil)	Points
1	(Italy) Ferrari	1	1^{P}^{F}	1^{P}	1^{P}^{F}	1^{F}	1^{P}^{F}	Ret^{F}	1^{P}^{F}	1	1	1^{F}	1^{F}	1^{P}	1^{P}^{F}	2	2	12^{F}	1^{P}	7	262
1	(Italy) Ferrari	2	2	4	2	6	2	3	2	2^{F}	2^{P}^{F}	3	3	12	2	3	1^{P}^{F}	1^{P}	Ret^{F}	3^{P}	262
2	(United Kingdom) BAR-Honda	9	6	3	3	2^{P}	8	2	3	3	Ret	5	4	2	5	Ret	3	2	3	Ret	119
2	(United Kingdom) BAR-Honda	10	9	15†	5	16†	5	Ret	Ret	Ret	3	Ret	11	8	6	Ret	4	6	4	6	119
3	(France) Renault	7	7	5	4	5	3	1^{P}	4	Ret	4	4	Ret	11	Ret	9^{P}	10	11	10	10	105
3	(France) Renault	8	3	7	6	4	4	Ret	5	Ret	Ret	2^{P}	10	3	3	Ret	Ret	4	5	4	105
4	(United Kingdom) Williams-BMW	3	5	2^{F}	13	3	Ret	4	8	DSQ	DSQ	8	5	5	4	Ret	5	5	7	1^{F}	88
4	(United Kingdom) Williams-BMW	4	4	Ret	7	7	6	10†	Ret	DSQ^{P}	Ret	10	12	7	7	Ret	7	Ret	2	5	88
5	(United Kingdom) McLaren-Mercedes	5	8	6	Ret	12	10	Ret	Ret	6	7	6	7	4	9	7	6	9	Ret	11	69
5	(United Kingdom) McLaren-Mercedes	6	Ret	Ret	Ret	8	11	Ret	Ret	5	6	7	2^{P}	Ret^{F}	Ret	1^{F}	Ret	3	6	2	69
6	(Switzerland) Sauber-Petronas	11	10	11	11	9	7	Ret	6	4	9†	12	6	9	8	5	8	7	8	9	34
6	(Switzerland) Sauber-Petronas	12	Ret	8	12	10	9	5	9	Ret	Ret	13	9	13	Ret	4	12	8	9	8	34
7	(United Kingdom) Jaguar-Cosworth	14	Ret	Ret	8	13	12	Ret	7	Ret	Ret	9	8	6	10	Ret	9	10	Ret	Ret	10
7	(United Kingdom) Jaguar-Cosworth	15	11	10	14	14	Ret	Ret	12	9	Ret	11	14	10	13	6	13	Ret	12	14	10
8	(Japan) Toyota	16	12	9	10	Ret	13	6	Ret	DSQ	Ret	14	13	Ret	Ret	10†	11	Ret	11	12	9
8	(Japan) Toyota	17	13	12	9	11	Ret	8	11	DSQ	5	15	Ret	14	11	8	Ret	14	14	13	9
9	(Republic of Ireland) Jordan-Ford	18	Ret	Ret	15	Ret	Ret	7	10	8	Ret	16	15	Ret	12	11	14	13	13	Ret	5
9	(Republic of Ireland) Jordan-Ford	19	14	13	16	Ret	Ret	Ret	13	7	Ret	17	Ret	15	Ret	Ret	Ret	15	15	15	5
10	(Italy) Minardi-Cosworth	20	NC	14	17	Ret	Ret	Ret	14	Ret	Ret	18†	16	17	14	Ret	Ret	Ret	16	17	1
10	(Italy) Minardi-Cosworth	21	Ret	16	Ret	15	Ret	9	15	10	8	Ret	Ret	16	15	Ret	15	16	Ret	16	1
Pos.	Constructor	No.	AUS (Australia)	MAL (Malaysia)	BHR (Bahrain)	SMR (Italy)	ESP (Spain)	MON (Monaco)	EUR (Germany)	CAN (Canada)	USA (United States)	FRA (France)	GBR (United Kingdom)	GER (Germany)	HUN (Hungary)	BEL (Belgium)	ITA (Italy)	CHN (China)	JPN (Japan)	BRA (Brazil)	Points

Key
Colour	Result
Gold	Winner
Silver	Second place
Bronze	Third place
Green	Other points position
Blue	Other classified position
Blue	Not classified, finished (NC)
Purple	Not classified, retired (Ret)
Red	Did not qualify (DNQ)
Black	Disqualified (DSQ)
White	Did not start (DNS)
White	Race cancelled (C)
Blank	Did not practice (DNP)
Blank	Excluded (EX)
Blank	Did not arrive (DNA)
Blank	Withdrawn (WD)
Blank	Did not enter (empty cell)
Annotation	Meaning
P	Pole position
F	Fastest lap

Notes:

- † – Drivers did not finish the Grand Prix, but were classified as they completed more than 90% of the race distance.
- Official FIA classifications for the 2004 Constructors' Championship listed the constructors as Scuderia Ferrari Marlboro, Lucky Strike BAR Honda, Mild Seven Renault F1 Team, etc.
