= 2004 San Marino Grand Prix =

Coordinates: 44°20′38″N 11°43′00″E

Race 4 of 18 in the 2004 Formula One World Championship
← Previous race	Next race →

Race details
- Date: April 25, 2004
- Official name: Gran Premio Foster's di San Marino 2004
- Location: Autodromo Enzo e Dino Ferrari, Imola, Emilia-Romagna, Italy
- Course: Permanent racing facility
- Course length: 4.933 km (3.065 miles)
- Distance: 62 laps, 305.609 km (189.897 miles)
- Weather: Sunny, Air: 22 °C (72 °F), Track 38 °C (100 °F)

Pole position
Driver	(United Kingdom) Jenson Button	BAR-Honda
- Time: 1:19.753

Fastest lap
Driver	(Germany) Michael Schumacher	Ferrari
- Time: 1:20.411 on lap 10 (lap record)

Podium
First	(Germany) Michael Schumacher	Ferrari
Second	(United Kingdom) Jenson Button	BAR-Honda
Third	(Colombia) Juan Pablo Montoya	Williams-BMW

The 2004 San Marino Grand Prix (officially the Gran Premio Foster's di San Marino 2004) was a Formula One motor race held on 25 April 2004 at the Autodromo Enzo e Dino Ferrari, Imola. It was Race 4 of 18 in the 2004 FIA Formula One World Championship.

The 62-lap race was won by Michael Schumacher driving a Ferrari. BAR-Honda driver Jenson Button finished second after starting from pole position. Juan Pablo Montoya finished third in a Williams-BMW.

== Friday drivers ==
The bottom 6 teams in the 2003 Constructors' Championship were entitled to run a third car in free practice on Friday. These drivers drove on Friday but did not compete in qualifying or the race.

Constructor	Nat	Driver
BAR-Honda	(United Kingdom)	Anthony Davidson
Sauber-Petronas		-
Jaguar-Cosworth	(Sweden)	Björn Wirdheim
Toyota	(Brazil)	Ricardo Zonta
Jordan-Ford	(Germany)	Timo Glock
Minardi-Cosworth	(Belgium)	Bas Leinders

== Report ==
=== Background ===
The 2004 San Marino Grand Prix marked the 10th anniversary of Roland Ratzenberger and Ayrton Senna's fatal accidents in 1994.

=== Qualifying ===
Qualifying gave BAR's Jenson Button his maiden career pole position, ahead of Michael Schumacher, Juan Pablo Montoya, Rubens Barrichello and Ralf Schumacher. Both Giancarlo Fisichella and Kimi Räikkönen failed to set a time in the session, leaving them at the back of the grid. Rain fell on the Imola circuit overnight, washing away much of the rubber that had been laid down over the weekend, theoretically handing the advantage to teams with Bridgestone tyres.

=== Race ===
On race day it was warm and sunny, and the circuit was completely dry for the start of the race. As the lights went out, Button got away well, leading the field through the first corners. At the first chicane, David Coulthard locked his brakes and ran into the back of Fernando Alonso, dislodging Coulthard's front wing and sending the Scot into the gravel trap. He rejoined the track, but was already a long way behind and was forced to pit to repair the damage. Meanwhile, Montoya attempted to pass Michael Schumacher around the outside of the Tosa corner, with Schumacher squeezing Montoya onto the grass and forcing the pair to touch wheels as they exited the corner. Later, Schumacher explained that he could not see Montoya beside him. The incident caused Montoya to lose momentum, and fall back towards his teammate Ralf Schumacher. As the German attempted to pass Montoya, the Colombian forced him across the track and onto the slippery grass, where Ralf Schumacher kept his foot on the throttle, but was forced to yield the position, and lost another position to Takuma Sato.

At the end of the first lap, Button had built a good lead over Michael Schumacher, Montoya, Sato, Ralf Schumacher and Barrichello. Michael Schumacher closed the gap quickly though, putting in consecutive fastest laps to put pressure on Button. The pair pulled away from the field easily, both lapping at nearly 1 second faster than every other driver. On lap 4, Coulthard, still struggling at the back of the field, went off track momentarily to short-cut the chicane. Cristiano da Matta and Felipe Massa became the first drivers to pit on lap 7, Massa dropping from 11th to 14th, but taking a position from da Matta due to his faster stop. Giorgio Pantano became the first retirement of the race, going off track thanks to a hydraulics failure. Lap 8 saw Montoya become the first front-runner to stop, followed into the pits by Mark Webber. Button showed that his qualifying effort was mainly due to a lighter fuel load, stopping on lap 9 to release Michael Schumacher, who immediately started to lap faster. Ralf Schumacher, Olivier Panis and Christian Klien also made their first stops on lap 9. Sato and Barrichello pitted on lap 10, but Barrichello's faster stop allowed the Brazilian to get ahead as they exited the pits. Michael Schumacher's stop came on lap 11, but he had built up enough of a lead over Button to emerge well ahead. Jarno Trulli, momentarily in second place, pitted on lap 12, with fast work by the Renault team allowing him to take 4th position from Ralf Schumacher. Nick Heidfeld was the last of the three-stoppers to make his stop on lap 14, leaving Fisichella and Räikkönen, in 9th and 10th as the only drivers not to make a pit stop.

Barrichello, with a clearly faster car, closed up on Ralf Schumacher, but was unable to pass for several laps as Michael Schumacher built up a 12-second lead at the end of 18 laps. Coulthard, who had been switched to a two-stop strategy due to his first lap collision, made his stop on lap 19, with Fisichella following on lap 20, then Räikkönen on lap 21. Meanwhile, Massa took 11th place from Jaguar's Mark Webber, the Australian suffering a misfire in his Cosworth engine. Cristiano da Matta was again the first to pit in the second round of stops, refuelling on lap 23, followed by Webber and Massa the following lap. Minardi's Gianmaria Bruni entered the pits, with the team engineers apparently unprepared for his stop. Soon later he retired from the race, citing a continuously locking rear brake, which made the car difficult to drive. Montoya stopped on lap 25, falling back from 3rd to 7th, followed by Button on lap 26, who was able to retain his 2nd position. Michael Schumacher pitted from the lead on lap 27, easily retaining his position, with an 18-second lead. Ralf Schumacher, Barrichello and Sato all pitted on the following lap, which saw Schumacher just retain his position ahead of Barrichello, the pair nearly colliding as Schumacher was released from his pit area. Fernando Alonso then pitted on lap 30, rejoining behind Ralf Schumacher and Barrichello, who were still close together on the circuit. Trulli then stopped the following lap, splitting Schumacher and Barrichello to take fifth.

da Matta was served with a drive-through penalty for ignoring blue flags, but made a mistake and went off track soon after, ending his race. After 35 laps, Button was able to find some pace, but not enough to significantly reduce Schumacher's lead, which stood at 16.4 seconds. Both Sauber drivers, on different strategies, took their final stops on lap 38. Coulthard made his second and final stop for the day on lap 40, leaving him in 14th position. Räikkönen, in the other McLaren was also struggling in the midfield, but hopeful to pick up his first point of the year, pitted on lap 41. The final round of pitstops for the frontrunners began on lap 43, with Montoya and Barrichello pitting, followed by Button and Ralf Schumacher on lap 44, then Michael Schumacher and Trulli on lap 46. Trulli kept his position ahead of Barrichello, before Alonso's stop on lap 48 saw the Spaniard move ahead of both Barrichello and Trulli, into 5th position. Alonso began pressuring Ralf Schumacher, and on lap 51, attempted an overtaking move on the inside of Tosa, which saw the pair collide, sending Schumacher into a spin and dropping him down to 7th. The stewards announced the incident would be investigated after the race. Heidfeld retired from the race with a transmission problem, as Alonso moved in on Montoya and Barrichello got closer to Trulli.

Sato retired from the race with a spectacular Honda engine failure with 6 laps remaining, possibly causing worry for teammate Button, who was in 2nd position. The retirement moved Räikkönen into 8th, eyeing his first point for the 2004 season. Michael Schumacher cruised to the finish line to win his fourth race of the year, with Button in 2nd, and Montoya holding on to the final podium spot ahead of Alonso. Trulli survived an attack by Barrichello on the final lap to hold on to 5th, with Ralf Schumacher and Räikkönen closing out the pointscorers. The result continued Michael Schumacher's perfect start to the year, with a maximum 40 points from the first four races. Teammate Barrichello held on to second with 24 points, just ahead of the surprise package Button, on 23. The constructors championship underlined Ferrari's incredible early dominance, with the Italian team on 64, over double the score of second-placed Renault, on 31, followed by both Williams and BAR on 27.

== Classification ==
=== Qualifying ===
Pos	No	Driver	Constructor	Q1 Time	Q2 Time	Gap	Grid
1	9	(United Kingdom) Jenson Button	BAR-Honda	1:20.632	1:19.753	—	1
2	1	(Germany) Michael Schumacher	Ferrari	1:20.440	1:20.011	+0.258	2
3	3	(Colombia) Juan Pablo Montoya	Williams-BMW	1:19.805	1:20.212	+0.459	3
4	2	(Brazil) Rubens Barrichello	Ferrari	1:20.927	1:20.451	+0.698	4
5	4	(Germany) Ralf Schumacher	Williams-BMW	1:20.423	1:20.538	+0.785	5
6	8	(Spain) Fernando Alonso	Renault	1:21.799	1:20.895	+1.142	6
7	10	(Japan) Takuma Sato	BAR-Honda	1:20.984	1:20.913	+1.160	7
8	14	(Australia) Mark Webber	Jaguar-Cosworth	1:21.458	1:20.921	+1.168	8
9	7	(Italy) Jarno Trulli	Renault	1:21.669	1:21.034	+1.281	9
10	16	(Brazil) Cristiano da Matta	Toyota	1:21.737	1:21.087	+1.334	10
11	5	(United Kingdom) David Coulthard	McLaren-Mercedes	1:20.566	1:21.091	+1.338	11
12	12	(Brazil) Felipe Massa	Sauber-Petronas	1:22.154	1:21.532	+1.779	12
13	17	(France) Olivier Panis	Toyota	1:21.231	1:21.558	+1.805	13
14	15	(Austria) Christian Klien	Jaguar-Cosworth	1:22.246	1:21.949	+2.196	14
15	19	(Italy) Giorgio Pantano	Jordan-Ford	1:24.643	1:23.352	+3.599	15
16	18	(Germany) Nick Heidfeld	Jordan-Ford	1:23.055	1:23.488	+3.735	16
17	20	(Italy) Gianmaria Bruni	Minardi-Cosworth	1:26.463	1:26.899	+7.146	17
18	21	(Hungary) Zsolt Baumgartner	Minardi-Cosworth	1:27.319	1:46.299	+26.546	19^{3}
19	11	(Italy) Giancarlo Fisichella	Sauber-Petronas	1:20.716	No time^{1}		18
20	6	(Finland) Kimi Räikkönen	McLaren-Mercedes	1:21.181	No time^{2}		20^{3}

Notes

- ^1 – Giancarlo Fisichella did not get time in Q2 due to gearbox problems.
- ^2 – Kimi Räikkönen did not get time in Q2 due to exhaust problems.
- ^3 – Zsolt Baumgartner and Kimi Räikkönen received a 10-place grid penalty for engine changes.

=== Race ===
Pos	No	Driver	Constructor	Tyre	Laps	Time/Retired	Grid	Points
1	1	(Germany) Michael Schumacher	Ferrari	B	62	1:26:19.670	2	10
2	9	(United Kingdom) Jenson Button	BAR-Honda	M	62	+9.702	1	8
3	3	(Colombia) Juan Pablo Montoya	Williams-BMW	M	62	+21.617	3	6
4	8	(Spain) Fernando Alonso	Renault	M	62	+23.654	6	5
5	7	(Italy) Jarno Trulli	Renault	M	62	+36.216	9	4
6	2	(Brazil) Rubens Barrichello	Ferrari	B	62	+36.683	4	3
7	4	(Germany) Ralf Schumacher	Williams-BMW	M	62	+55.730	5	2
8	6	(Finland) Kimi Räikkönen	McLaren-Mercedes	M	61	+1 Lap	20	1
9	11	(Italy) Giancarlo Fisichella	Sauber-Petronas	B	61	+1 Lap	18	
10	12	(Brazil) Felipe Massa	Sauber-Petronas	B	61	+1 Lap	12	
11	17	(France) Olivier Panis	Toyota	M	61	+1 Lap	13	
12	5	(United Kingdom) David Coulthard	McLaren-Mercedes	M	61	+1 Lap	11	
13	14	(Australia) Mark Webber	Jaguar-Cosworth	M	61	+1 Lap	8	
14	15	(Austria) Christian Klien	Jaguar-Cosworth	M	60	+2 Laps	14	
15	21	(Hungary) Zsolt Baumgartner	Minardi-Cosworth	B	58	+4 Laps	19	
16	10	(Japan) Takuma Sato	BAR-Honda	M	56	Engine	7	
Ret	18	(Germany) Nick Heidfeld	Jordan-Ford	B	48	Driveshaft	16	
Ret	16	(Brazil) Cristiano da Matta	Toyota	M	32	Accident	10	
Ret	20	(Italy) Gianmaria Bruni	Minardi-Cosworth	B	22	Brakes	17	
Ret	19	(Italy) Giorgio Pantano	Jordan-Ford	B	6	Hydraulics/Spun off	15	

== Championship standings after the race ==
Drivers' Championship standings

+/–	Pos	Driver	Points
	1	(Germany) Michael Schumacher	40
	2	(Brazil) Rubens Barrichello	24
	3	(United Kingdom) Jenson Button	23
	4	(Colombia) Juan Pablo Montoya	18
	5	(Spain) Fernando Alonso	16

Constructors' Championship standings

+/–	Pos	Constructor	Points
	1	(Italy) Ferrari	64
	2	(France) Renault	31
	3	(United Kingdom) Williams-BMW	27
	4	(United Kingdom) BAR-Honda	27
	5	(United Kingdom) McLaren-Mercedes	5

- Note: Only the top five positions are included for both sets of standings.

== See also ==
- 2004 Imola F3000 round

Previous race: 2004 Bahrain Grand Prix	FIA Formula One World Championship; 2004 season	Next race: 2004 Spanish Grand Prix
Previous race: 2003 San Marino Grand Prix	San Marino Grand Prix	Next race: 2005 San Marino Grand Prix
