= 2004 Spanish Grand Prix =

Formula One motor race held in 2004

Coordinates: 41°34′12″N 2°15′40″E

Race 5 of 18 in the 2004 Formula One World Championship
← Previous race	Next race →

Race details
- Date: May 9, 2004
- Official name: Formula 1 Gran Premio Marlboro de España 2004
- Location: Circuit de Catalunya, Montmeló, Catalonia, Spain
- Course: Permanent racing facility
- Course length: 4.627 km (2.875 miles)
- Distance: 66 laps, 305.256 km (189.75 miles)
- Weather: Clear
- Attendance: 108,300

Pole position
Driver	(Germany) Michael Schumacher	Ferrari
- Time: 1:15.022

Fastest lap
Driver	(Germany) Michael Schumacher	Ferrari
- Time: 1:17.450 on lap 12

Podium
First	(Germany) Michael Schumacher	Ferrari
Second	(Brazil) Rubens Barrichello	Ferrari
Third	(Italy) Jarno Trulli	Renault

The 2004 Spanish Grand Prix (officially the Formula 1 Gran Premio Marlboro de España 2004) was a Formula One motor race held on 9 May 2004 at the Circuit de Catalunya, Montmeló, Spain. It was Race 5 of 18 in the 2004 FIA Formula One World Championship. The 66-lap race was won by Michael Schumacher for the Ferrari team. His teammate Rubens Barrichello finished second with Jarno Trulli third in a Renault car.

== Report ==
=== Background ===
Heading into the fifth race of the season, Ferrari driver Michael Schumacher was leading the World Drivers' Championship with 40 points; Rubens Barrichello was second on 24 points, 16 points behind Schumacher. Behind Schumacher and Barrichello in the Drivers' Championship, BAR driver Jenson Button was third on 23 points, with Juan Pablo Montoya and Fernando Alonso on 18 and 16 points respectively. In the World Constructors' Championship, Ferrari were leading on 64 points and Renault were second on 31 points, with Williams third on 27 points.

=== Friday drivers ===
The bottom 6 teams in the 2003 Constructors' Championship were entitled to run a third car in free practice on Friday. These drivers drove on Friday but did not compete in qualifying or the race.

Constructor	Nat	Driver
BAR-Honda	(United Kingdom)	Anthony Davidson
Sauber-Petronas		-
Jaguar-Cosworth	(Sweden)	Björn Wirdheim
Toyota	(Brazil)	Ricardo Zonta
Jordan-Ford	(Germany)	Timo Glock
Minardi-Cosworth	(Belgium)	Bas Leinders

=== Practice and qualifying ===
Four practice sessions were held before the Sunday race—two on Friday, and two on Saturday. The Friday morning and afternoon sessions each lasted an hour. The third and final practice sessions were held on Saturday morning and lasted 45 minutes.

The qualifying session was run as a one-lap session and took place on Friday and Saturday afternoon. The cars were run one at a time; the Friday running order was determined with the Championship leading heading out first. The Saturday running order was determined by times set in Friday afternoon qualifying with the fastest heading out last and the slowest running first. The lap times from the Friday afternoon session did not determine the grid order.

=== Race ===
The race started at 14:00 local time. During the warm-up lap of the race, a man calling himself Jimmy Jump ran through the starting grid, only to be apprehended soon by the security. While he claimed to have many fans (due to his other performances at football matches), he was criticized for risking the lives of the drivers, even though the cars were still travelling at low speed at this point.

Michael Schumacher dominated a largely uneventful race leading home his team-mate Rubens Barrichello. The most notable result was that of the McLaren team, with their drivers Kimi Räikkönen and David Coulthard finishing a lap down and outside of the points scoring positions, a far cry from their usual championship-contending performance.

== Classification ==
=== Qualifying ===
Pos	No	Driver	Constructor	Q1 Time	Q2 Time	Gap	Grid
1	1	(Germany) Michael Schumacher	Ferrari	1:16.320	1:15.022	—	1
2	3	(Colombia) Juan Pablo Montoya	Williams-BMW	1:15.574	1:15.639	+0.617	2
3	10	(Japan) Takuma Sato	BAR-Honda	1:16.434	1:15.809	+0.787	3
4	7	(Italy) Jarno Trulli	Renault	1:16.156	1:16.144	+1.122	4
5	2	(Brazil) Rubens Barrichello	Ferrari	1:16.655	1:16.272	+1.250	5
6	4	(Germany) Ralf Schumacher	Williams-BMW	1:16.040	1:16.293	+1.271	6
7	17	(France) Olivier Panis	Toyota	1:16.168	1:16.313	+1.291	7
8	8	(Spain) Fernando Alonso	Renault	1:17.011	1:16.422	+1.400	8
9	14	(Australia) Mark Webber	Jaguar-Cosworth	1:16.212	1:16.514	+1.492	9
10	5	(United Kingdom) David Coulthard	McLaren-Mercedes	1:16.465	1:16.636	+1.614	10
11	16	(Brazil) Cristiano da Matta	Toyota	1:16.758	1:17.038	+2.016	11
12	11	(Italy) Giancarlo Fisichella	Sauber-Petronas	1:15.746	1:17.444	+2.422	12
13	6	(Finland) Kimi Räikkönen	McLaren-Mercedes	1:16.240	1:17.445	+2.423	13
14	9	(United Kingdom) Jenson Button	BAR-Honda	1:16.462	1:17.575	+2.553	14
15	18	(Germany) Nick Heidfeld	Jordan-Ford	1:17.043	1:17.802	+2.780	15
16	15	(Austria) Christian Klien	Jaguar-Cosworth	1:17.863	1:17.812	+2.790	16
17	12	(Brazil) Felipe Massa	Sauber-Petronas	1:15.771	1:17.866	+2.844	17
18	20	(Italy) Gianmaria Bruni	Minardi-Cosworth	1:20.372	1:19.817	+4.795	18
19	19	(Italy) Giorgio Pantano	Jordan-Ford	1:17.965	1:20.607	+5.585	19
20	21	(Hungary) Zsolt Baumgartner	Minardi-Cosworth	1:21.620	1:21.470	+6.448	20

=== Race ===
Pos	No	Driver	Constructor	Tyre	Laps	Time/Retired	Grid	Points
1	1	(Germany) Michael Schumacher	Ferrari	B	66	1:27:32.841	1	10
2	2	(Brazil) Rubens Barrichello	Ferrari	B	66	+13.290	5	8
3	7	(Italy) Jarno Trulli	Renault	M	66	+32.294	4	6
4	8	(Spain) Fernando Alonso	Renault	M	66	+32.952	8	5
5	10	(Japan) Takuma Sato	BAR-Honda	M	66	+42.327	3	4
6	4	(Germany) Ralf Schumacher	Williams-BMW	M	66	+1:13.804	6	3
7	11	(Italy) Giancarlo Fisichella	Sauber-Petronas	B	66	+1:17.108	12	2
8	9	(United Kingdom) Jenson Button	BAR-Honda	M	65	+1 Lap	14	1
9	12	(Brazil) Felipe Massa	Sauber-Petronas	B	65	+1 Lap	17	
10	5	(United Kingdom) David Coulthard	McLaren-Mercedes	M	65	+1 Lap	10	
11	6	(Finland) Kimi Räikkönen	McLaren-Mercedes	M	65	+1 Lap	13	
12	14	(Australia) Mark Webber	Jaguar-Cosworth	M	65	+1 Lap	9	
13	16	(Brazil) Cristiano da Matta	Toyota	M	65	+1 Lap	11	
Ret	19	(Italy) Giorgio Pantano	Jordan-Ford	B	51	Power steering	19	
Ret	3	(Colombia) Juan Pablo Montoya	Williams-BMW	M	46	Brakes	2	
Ret	15	(Austria) Christian Klien	Jaguar-Cosworth	M	43	Throttle	16	
Ret	17	(France) Olivier Panis	Toyota	M	33	Hydraulics	7	
Ret	18	(Germany) Nick Heidfeld	Jordan-Ford	B	33	Hydraulics	15	
Ret	20	(Italy) Gianmaria Bruni	Minardi-Cosworth	B	31	Spin	18	
Ret	21	(Hungary) Zsolt Baumgartner	Minardi-Cosworth	B	17	Spin	20	

== Championship standings after the race ==
Drivers' Championship standings

+/–	Pos	Driver	Points
	1	(Germany) Michael Schumacher	50
	2	(Brazil) Rubens Barrichello	32
	3	(United Kingdom) Jenson Button	24
1	4	(Spain) Fernando Alonso	21
1	5	(Italy) Jarno Trulli	21

Constructors' Championship standings

+/–	Pos	Constructor	Points
	1	(Italy) Ferrari	82
	2	(France) Renault	42
1	3	(United Kingdom) BAR-Honda	32
1	4	(United Kingdom) Williams-BMW	30
	5	(United Kingdom) McLaren-Mercedes	5

- Note: Only the top five positions are included for both sets of standings.

== See also ==
- 2004 Barcelona F3000 round

Previous race: 2004 San Marino Grand Prix	FIA Formula One World Championship; 2004 season	Next race: 2004 Monaco Grand Prix
Previous race: 2003 Spanish Grand Prix	Spanish Grand Prix	Next race: 2005 Spanish Grand Prix
