= Jenson Button =

British racing driver (born 1980)

Jenson Button MBE
- Button in 2026
- Born: Jenson Alexander Lyons Button; 19 January 1980 (age 46); Frome, Somerset, England
- Spouses: Jessica Michibata (m. 2014; div. 2015) Brittny Ward (m. 2022)
- Partners: Louise Griffiths (2000–2005)
- Children: 2

Formula One World Championship career
- Nationality: (United Kingdom) British
- Active years: 2000–2017
- Team(s): Williams, Benetton, Renault, BAR, Honda, Brawn, McLaren
- Car number: 22
- Entries: 309 (306 starts)
- Championships: 1 (2009)
- Wins: 15
- Podiums: 50
- Career points: 1235
- Pole positions: 8
- Fastest laps: 8
- First entry: 2000 Australian Grand Prix
- First win: 2006 Hungarian Grand Prix
- Last win: 2012 Brazilian Grand Prix
- Last entry: 2017 Monaco Grand Prix

FIA World Endurance Championship career
- Categorisation: FIA Platinum
- Years active: 2018–2025
- Teams: Jota, SMP
- Starts: 20
- Championships: 0
- Wins: 0
- Podiums: 2
- Poles: 0
- Fastest laps: 0
- Best finish: 10th in 2025 (HY)

Super GT career
- Years active: 2017–2019
- Teams: Mugen, Kunimitsu
- Starts: 17
- Championships: 1 (2018)
- Wins: 1
- Podiums: 6
- Poles: 1
- Fastest laps: 0
- Best finish: 1st in 2018 (GT500)

NASCAR Cup Series career
- 3 races run over 1 year
- First race: 2023 EchoPark Automotive Grand Prix (Texas)
- Last race: 2023 Verizon 200 at the Brickyard (Indianapolis)
| Wins | Top tens | Poles |
|---|---|---|
| 0 | 0 | 0 |

Jenson Alexander Lyons Button (born 19 January 1980) is a British former racing driver who competed in Formula One from 2000 to 2017. Button won the Formula One World Drivers' Championship in 2009 with Brawn, and won 15 Grands Prix across 18 seasons.

Button began karting at the age of eight and achieved early success before progressing to car racing in the British Formula Ford Championship and the British Formula 3 Championship. He first drove in F1 with Williams for the 2000 season. The following year, he switched to Benetton, which, at the start of the 2002 season, became the Renault team, and then moved to BAR for the 2003 season. He finished third in the 2004 World Drivers' Championship before falling to ninth in the 2005 championship. BAR was subsequently renamed and became the Honda team for the 2006 season, during which Button won his first Grand Prix at the Hungarian Grand Prix after 113 races.

Following the withdrawal of Honda from the sport in December 2008, Button was left without a team for the 2009 season. In February 2009, Ross Brawn led a management buyout of Honda, creating Brawn GP and recruiting Button as a driver. Button went on to win a record-equalling six of the first seven races of the 2009 season, securing the Drivers' Championship at the Brazilian Grand Prix, having led on points all season; his success also helped Brawn GP to secure that year's Constructors' Championship.

At the start of the 2010 season, Button moved to McLaren, partnering fellow British racer Lewis Hamilton. After finishing fifth for the team in 2010, Button ended the 2011 season as runner-up, before falling to fifth in the 2012 championship. Four more seasons with McLaren resulted in no further victories and he retired from Formula One at the end of 2016, making a one-off return at the 2017 Monaco Grand Prix to deputise for Fernando Alonso. From the 306 races that Button started, he won fifteen, qualified on pole position eight times, took fifty podium finishes and scored 1,235 championship points.

After his F1 career, Button became champion of the 2018 season of the Super GT Series alongside Naoki Yamamoto, with whom he shared a Honda racing car at Team Kunimitsu. He also competed part-time in the NASCAR Cup Series, driving the No. 15 Ford Mustang for Rick Ware Racing with support from Stewart–Haas Racing and sponsorship from Mobil 1.

== Early life and education ==
Button was born on 19 January 1980 in Frome, Somerset and brought up in nearby Vobster, Mells. He is the fourth child of the half-South African Simone Lyons and former rallycross driver John Button from London's East End, who was well known in the United Kingdom during most of the 1970s for racing his Volkswagen Type 1, which was nicknamed the Colorado Beetle. Jenson's parents met in Newquay at a young age and were reunited after a musical concert at Longleat. According to John, Jenson was named after his Danish friend and rallycross opponent Erling Jensen, changing the "e" to an "o" to differentiate it from Jensen Motors, while Simone recalls that she named him Jenson after noticing a Jensen sports car and thought the change of spelling would be "more mannish".

Button enjoyed racing from an early age, racing a BMX bike with friends after school, and began watching Formula One races with his father around the age of five. He idolised four-time world champion Alain Prost for his calm personality and intellectual approach to driving. After his parents divorced when he was seven, he and his three elder sisters were brought up by their mother in Frome. Button was educated at Vallis First School, Selwood Middle School and Frome Community College. His karting career limited his studying and he left school with one GCSE. Button failed his first driving test for driving between two cars on a narrow road.

== Karting career ==
Button's father gave him a 50cc bike for his seventh birthday; he discarded it after half an hour because it lacked speed, which would have required his father to remove its restrictor, and he disliked his father's idea of progressing to the 80cc category. John talked to rallycross driver and Ripspeed car accessories owner Keith Ripp at an Earl's Court racing car show about his son; Ripp recommended the purchase of a Zip go-kart suited for the newly formed Cadets class for eight to twelve year-old karters for the young boy. Button received the kart as a Christmas present in 1987 and he began karting at the Clay Pigeon Raceway in May 1988 aged eight following repeated questions by club members to his father on when Button would start racing. (Note: Button drove go-karts for fun before someone suggested he race competitively. His father sold most of his possessions and opened a shop to fund his son's karting career.)

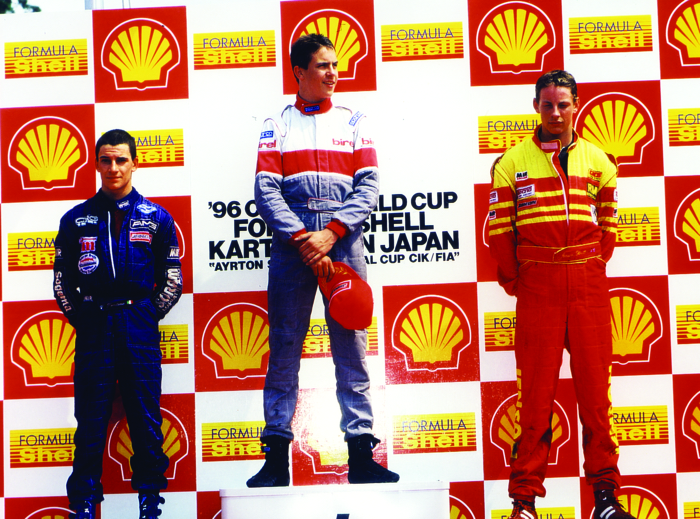
Button (on the right) after finishing third at the 1996 Ayrton Senna Memorial Trophy

Button was required to drive on slick tyres on a wet track because his father wanted him to learn car control on a sodden surface and taught him basic driving techniques by standing at a corner and pointing to where his son should brake. In 1989, aged nine, Button won the British Super Prix. Midway through the year, his father spoke to him about progressing to the club level since others noticed he was competitive, which Button was interested in. He won all 34 races of the 1991 British Cadet Kart Championship and the title with team Wright Karts. Afterwards Button told his father his objective was to compete in F1 and he was given a map to chart his progress in karting. The two agreed to give each other more autonomy and Button was mentored by mechanic Dave Spencer in moving from the Cadets to Juniors class. Spencer told him to be more aggressive and less smooth driving Junior karts because they have more power than a Cadet kart. Button was also required to manage the condition of his tyres to retain grip.

Further successes followed, including three British Open Kart Championship wins. A series of sub-par performances in 1992 gave Button doubts over his ability to win races and he told his father he wanted to continue racing after dismissing the suggestion of two months away from karting. The family telephoned Spencer for advice; he and Button's father constructed the young boy's karts and influenced his school headteacher to change his fitness regime and had to eschew unhealthy beverages. Spencer helped him to observe and concentrate on how others drove their karts, and continued to coach Button until his youngest son Danny died in a multi-kart accident at the Hunts Kart Racing Club in Kimbolton, Cambridgeshire in December 1994.

Button was fourth in the 1994 RAC British Junior Championship after losing the opportunity to claim the title through a series of accidents. He joined the Birel team for that year's Junior Intercontinental A European Championship and raced as a professional in the Junior Intercontinental A Italian Winter Championship. He was the youngest runner-up of the Formula A World Championship at age 15. Button was signed to drive Tecno-Rotax karts for Team GKS, coming fifth in the 1996 European Formula A Championship, third in the Formula A World Cup, and third in the American Championship. In 1997, he was moved to the top-level of karting Formula Super A by his team. Button won the Ayrton Senna Memorial Cup for finishing second in the 1997 Japanese World Cup, and became the youngest driver and first Briton to claim the European Super A Championship. He also was runner-up in the Winter Cup before the European Super A Championship.

== Junior car career ==
Aged eighteen, Button moved into single seater car racing after his mentor Paul Lemmens spoke to racing manager and former driver Harald Huysman about him. He was signed to businessman David Robertson and Huysman's managerial stable, who found him sponsorship to continue driving. (Note: Huysman and Roberston agreed to finance Button's career on the condition he paid 35 per cent of his future income to both men.) Robertson wanted Button to test a Carlin Motorsport Dallara F3 Mugen-Honda car at the Pembrey Circuit and quickly became acclimated with a more powerful vehicle and extra downforce. Huysman and Robertson wanted Button to enter Formula Three (F3) but Button said he could not do so with his inexperience in car racing and did not want to enter the category for fear of immediately being uncompetitive. Button instead moved to Formula Ford for the 1998 season. He took the British Formula Ford Championship in a Haywood Racing Mygale SJ98 car with nine victories and won the season-ending Formula Ford Festival at Brands Hatch. Button also finished runner-up in the European Formula Ford Championship with one victory from four races.

At the end of 1998, Button won the annual Autosport BRDC Award, which included a test in a McLaren MP4/14 F1 car that he received in November 1999. Huysman and Robertson sought a seat for him in F3 and spoke to Promatecme team owner Serge Saulnier, who did not want to sign Button because he was not part of Renault's driver academy. Additional lobbying from Mygale and Lemmens convinced Saulnier to give Button a test at the Circuit de Nevers Magny-Cours in France. He impressed Saulnier and accepted his offer to drive at Promatecme. Saulnier taught Button on the downforce of F3 cars and how to maintain it.

Button drove in the British Formula 3 International Series in 1999 in a slightly underpowered Renault-Dallara F399 car compared to the Mugen-Honda engine, with guidance from trainer-physiotherapist Josef Leberer. Amongst more experienced racers, he won three times—at Thruxton, Pembrey and Silverstone—to finish the season as the top rookie driver, and third overall. He finished fifth and second respectively in the Marlboro Masters and Macau Grand Prix, (Note: He declined offers from two F3 teams to race in the 1998 Macau Grand Prix because he thought it an overly optimistic move to make early in his career.) losing out by 0.035 seconds to Darren Manning in Macau. Button was required to decide on his future post-season. He did not want another year in F3 and twice tested a higher-tier Formula 3000 (F3000) car with both the Super Nova Racing and Fortec Motorsport teams at the Jerez circuit in Spain, which he disliked because its sequential gearbox forced him to drive aggressively, and found the cars somewhat heavy.

== Formula One career ==
=== Williams (2000) ===
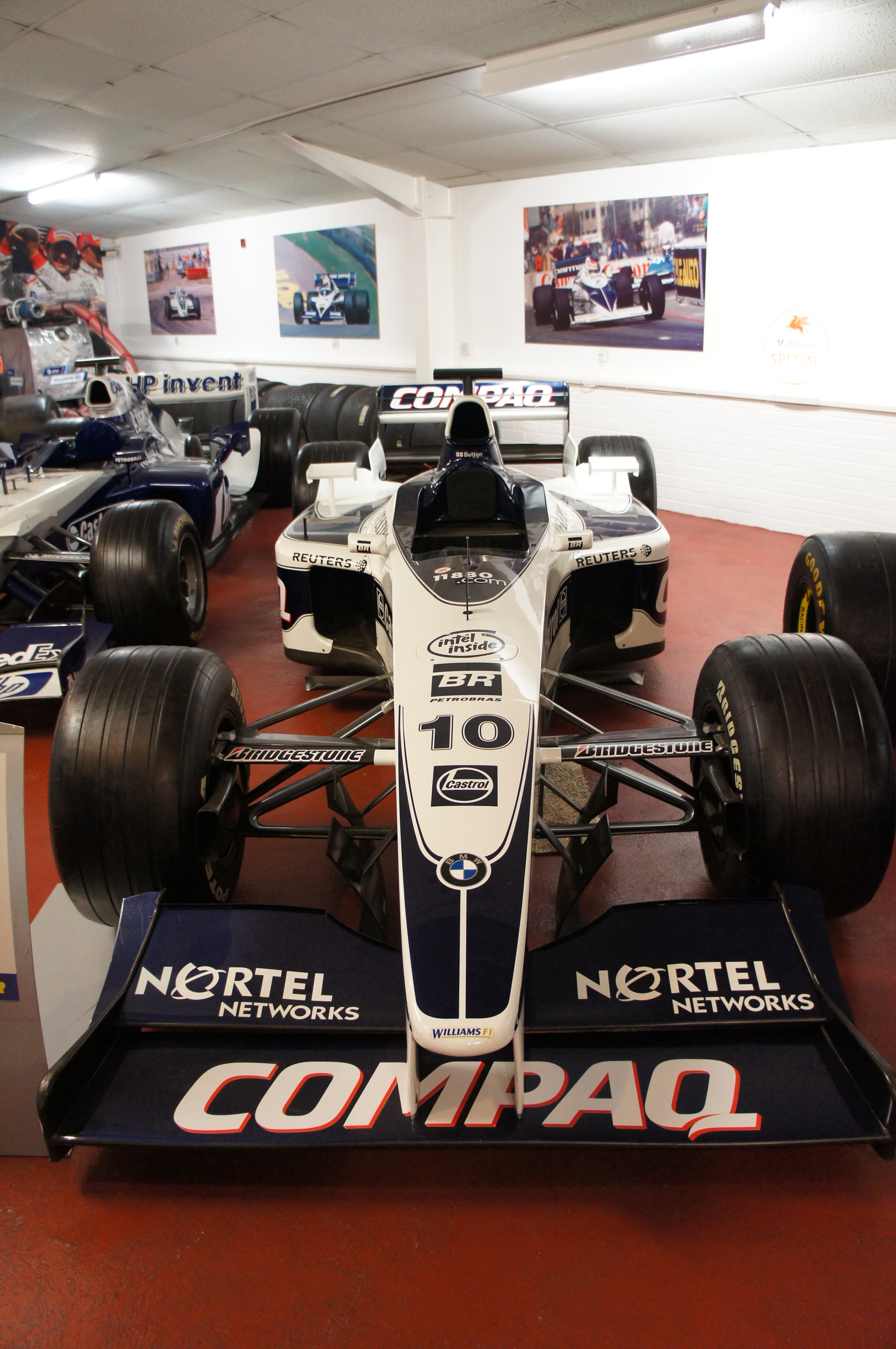
Button's Williams FW22 at the Donington Grand Prix Exhibition.

In November 1999, Button had his McLaren test prize at the Silverstone club circuit in a MP4/13 car and impressed team owner Ron Dennis. He also tested for the Prost team at the Circuit de Catalunya after the team owner Alain Prost was impressed by Button's ability and asked him to test. Prost offered Button a drive at his F3000 squad before becoming his F1 team's test driver for one season to prepare for competitive driving. He did not commit because Prost had not prepared to fulfill the promise of a F1 seat. Huysman and Robertson declined Dennis' offer for Button to join the McLaren team and a seat from Jaguar chairman Jackie Stewart.

A vacant race seat became available at the Williams team following the departure of two-time CART champion Alessandro Zanardi. Other contenders for the seat included sports car driver Jörg Müller and Japanese Formula Three champion Darren Manning. On 24 December 1999, team founder and principal Frank Williams telephoned Button, who first thought it a joke, and asked whether he was ready to drive in F1 to which he said no. Button's father instructed him to tell Williams he was indeed ready. Button talked with Williams and BMW motorsport director Gerhard Berger and a 'shoot-out' test was arranged between Button and F3000 racer and test driver Bruno Junqueira at Jerez in a Williams FW21B car modified by being fitted with a BMW engine. with Button securing the drive, even though the majority of the team's engineers preferred Junqueira. This made him Britain's youngest ever F1 driver, beating the previous record held by Stirling Moss. Button did not hold a FIA Super Licence and the FIA president Max Mosley required him to complete 300 km (190 mi) on two consecutive days of testing and support from 18 of the 26 members of the F1 Commission. The FIA chose to issue him with a super licence regardless. Button worked with a physiotherapist to help build his strength to drive an F1 car.

A sixth-place finish at the season's second race in Brazil made him the youngest driver in history to score a point. (Note: The current holder of this record is Max Verstappen who finished seventh at the 2015 Malaysian Grand Prix when he was 17 years, 180 days old.) In his first six races, he qualified higher than his teammate Ralf Schumacher twice, and was consistently close in pace. However, Williams had intended to use Button only until they could exercise their option to buy the highly rated Juan Pablo Montoya out of his contract at Chip Ganassi Racing. A dip in Button's form, combined with Montoya's victory in the 2000 Indianapolis 500, led to Montoya being announced as his replacement midway through the season. Williams chose not to sell Button's contract, keeping the right to recall him in 2003. He went to Benetton Formula on a two-year loan.

Button's best qualification of the season was third place in the Belgian Grand Prix at Spa-Francorchamps; and his best result was fourth in the German Grand Prix. After concerns about his inexperience, he made a few errors during the season, the most notable coming in the Italian Grand Prix at Monza. Under safety car conditions Button swerved to avoid the pack which had bunched up, and crashed into a barrier. Button finished his debut season in eighth place with twelve points.

=== Team Enstone (2001–2002) ===
==== Benetton (2001) ====
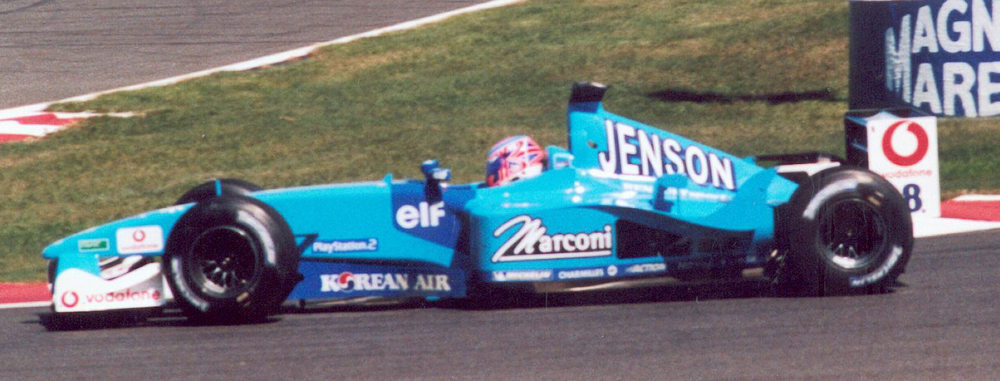
Button at the 2001 French Grand Prix driving for Benetton.

For 2001, Button partnered experienced driver Giancarlo Fisichella at Benetton, which had recently been purchased by Renault. His car was very uncompetitive due to a lack of power steering and horsepower to the faster teams coupled with a lack of pre-season testing and he was consistently outperformed by his teammate. He finished seventeenth in the Drivers' Championship with a total of two points scored; his best result was a fifth-place finish at the German Grand Prix. His poor form led to speculation he would be replaced before the end of the year; team principal Flavio Briatore said, "Either he shows he's super-good or he leaves the top echelon of drivers", and reportedly offered him the chance to leave. Briatore believed Button's inexperience showed as he struggled to help his team set up a competitive car. His lack of success combined with an extravagant lifestyle led some press publications to dub him a "playboy".

==== Renault (2002) ====
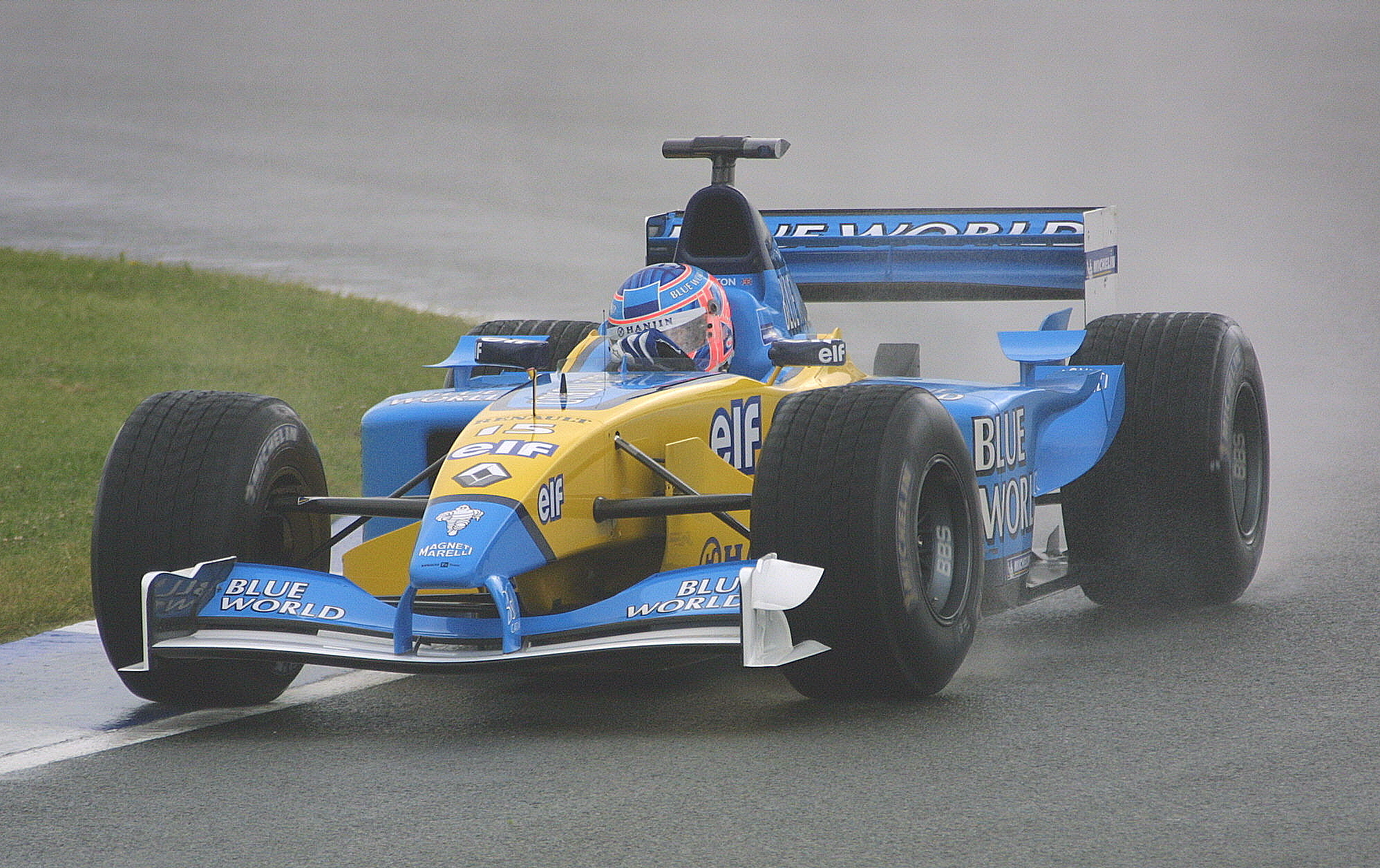
Button competing for Renault at the 2002 British Grand Prix

In 2002, Benetton was re-branded as Renault, and Jarno Trulli joined the team to partner Button. In a bid to improve his public image over the pre-season interval, he changed his social life habits, spending more time training, and separating from Robertson and Huysman to join John Byfield's sport managerial stable after Briatore talked to Button about Byfield. In late 2001, Briatore invited Button to spend ten days at a ranch in Kenya, to become acquainted with his peers and do physical training to eliminate a shoulder and back problem that had hindered him in 2001. Button spent a lot of time working with his engineering team and felt there was an improved understanding between them; Button described himself as "very confident" for the season.

At the season's second race in Malaysia, he was set for his first podium before a rear suspension problem on the final lap dropped him to fourth place. Button's performances were greatly improved from 2001 because his car had power steering and launch control; although often outqualified by Trulli, he showed the faster race pace to outscore his more experienced teammate. Despite Button's performances, and his desire to stay with Renault, he was told by Briatore by telephone that test driver Fernando Alonso would replace him in 2003. Briatore faced criticism for his decision, but stated "time will tell if I am wrong"; he would also accuse Button of being a "lazy playboy". In July, Button signed a two-year contract with British American Racing (BAR) with the option for a further two years after that to replace the outgoing Olivier Panis, partnering 1997 world champion Jacques Villeneuve, after discussions with several teams fell through. An important factor in his decision was the chance to work with David Richards, the BAR team principal, and he was impressed with the team's long-term programme. He finished the season seventh with fourteen points.

=== BAR/Honda/Brawn (2003–2009) ===
==== BAR (2003–2005) ====
===== 2003 =====
Button faced early hostility from new teammate Villeneuve, who said Button "should be in a boy band" and was not on speaking terms with him. Their relationship did not improve after the first race in Australia: Villeneuve was due to pit, but stayed out an extra lap and made a pit stop when Button was due in, leaving Button waiting in the pit lane while Villeneuve's car was serviced. Villeneuve blamed it on "radio problems", but both Button and Richards hinted that they did not believe him. Button scored eight points in the first six races, including a fourth place at the Austrian Grand Prix. His relationship with Villeneuve improved thereafter because of his better performance and said the comments were caused by inter-team changes. A high speed crash for Button during Saturday qualifying in Monaco briefly knocked him unconscious, and he was detained in hospital overnight. Despite the accident Button still wanted to race, but was withdrawn by his team on medical advice. He was cleared to race for the following Grand Prix in Montreal. Button continued to outperform his teammate and this helped rebuild his previously faltering reputation. Just before the final race in Japan, Villeneuve lost his seat at BAR, so Button was partnered with Takuma Sato; he took his second fourth place of the season, and finished ninth in the Drivers' Championship with seventeen points.

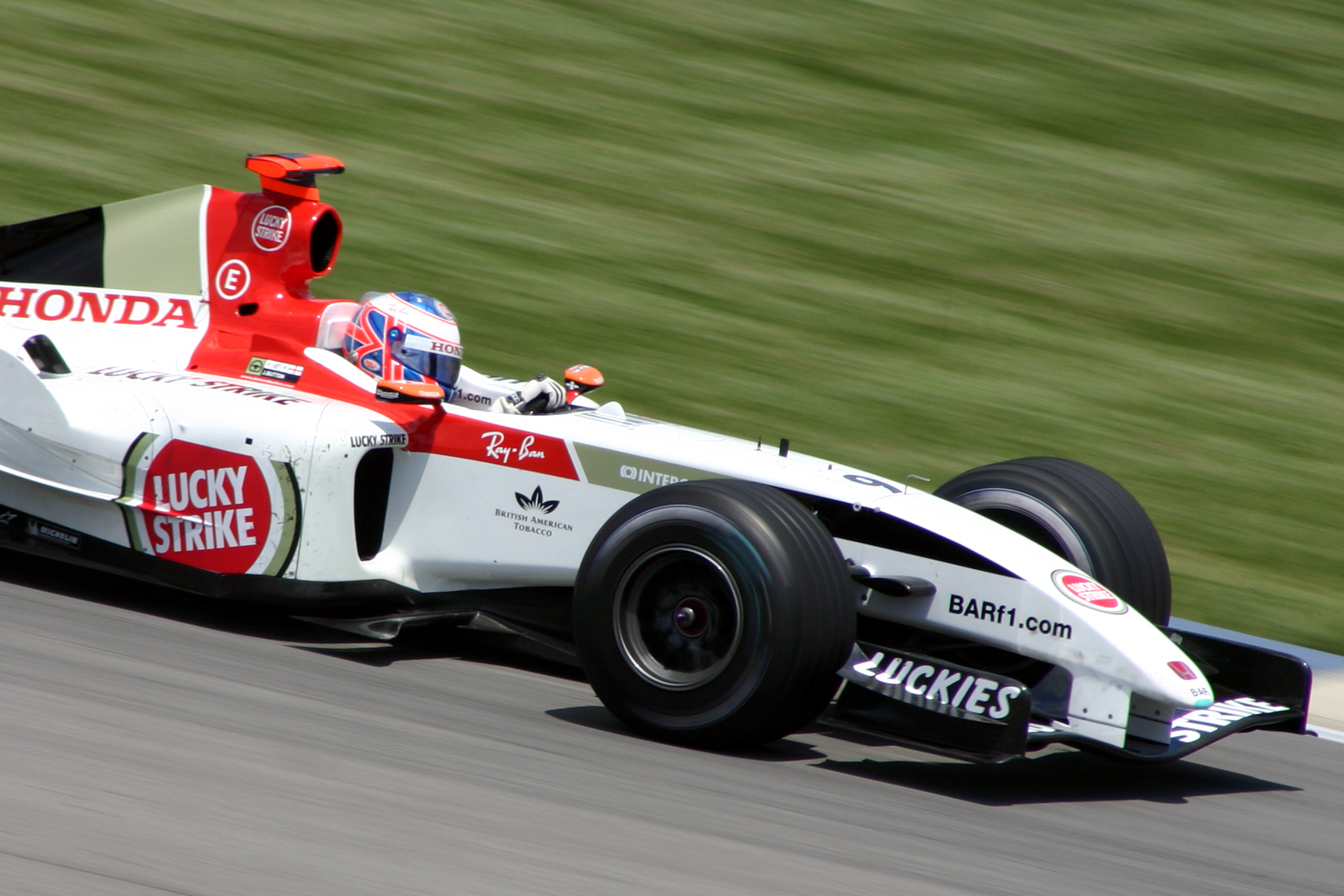
Button driving for BAR at the 2004 United States Grand Prix.

===== 2004 =====
The 2004 season was the first in which Button was the more experienced driver in his team. He was ambitious for the season, saying he wanted to challenge consistently for points and podium finishes. He took his first podium in the second race of the year—third-place at the Malaysian Grand Prix. He followed it up two weeks later with another third-place in Bahrain. In the next race at Imola, he took his first pole position and finished second behind Michael Schumacher. He took ten podiums in eighteen races, and scored no points in three. Button came third in the Drivers' Championship and helped BAR to take second in the Constructors' Championship.

In August, Button became embroiled in a contract dispute. On 5 August, Button chose to leave BAR and signed a two-year contract to return to Williams. He did so because BAR were not a works manufacturer team but Williams were in a partnership with BMW and felt they could help him win the Drivers' Championship. This was surprising, as Button was enjoying his best season to date, while Williams had been struggling. BAR insisted they had the right to exercise their option to retain Button. His management argued that the BAR option was not valid because it contained a clause allowing him to leave if BAR risked losing their Honda engines. They felt the new contract signed mid-year for Honda to supply engines to BAR was not definitive, and thus Button was free to move. The dispute went to F1's Contract Recognition Board, who ruled in favour of BAR on 20 October, forcing Button to stay with the team. Button separated from his manager John Byfield as a result, saying he had been badly advised. He asked his friend Richard Goodard to manage him, and employed a personal assistant in restructuring his organisation.

===== 2005 =====
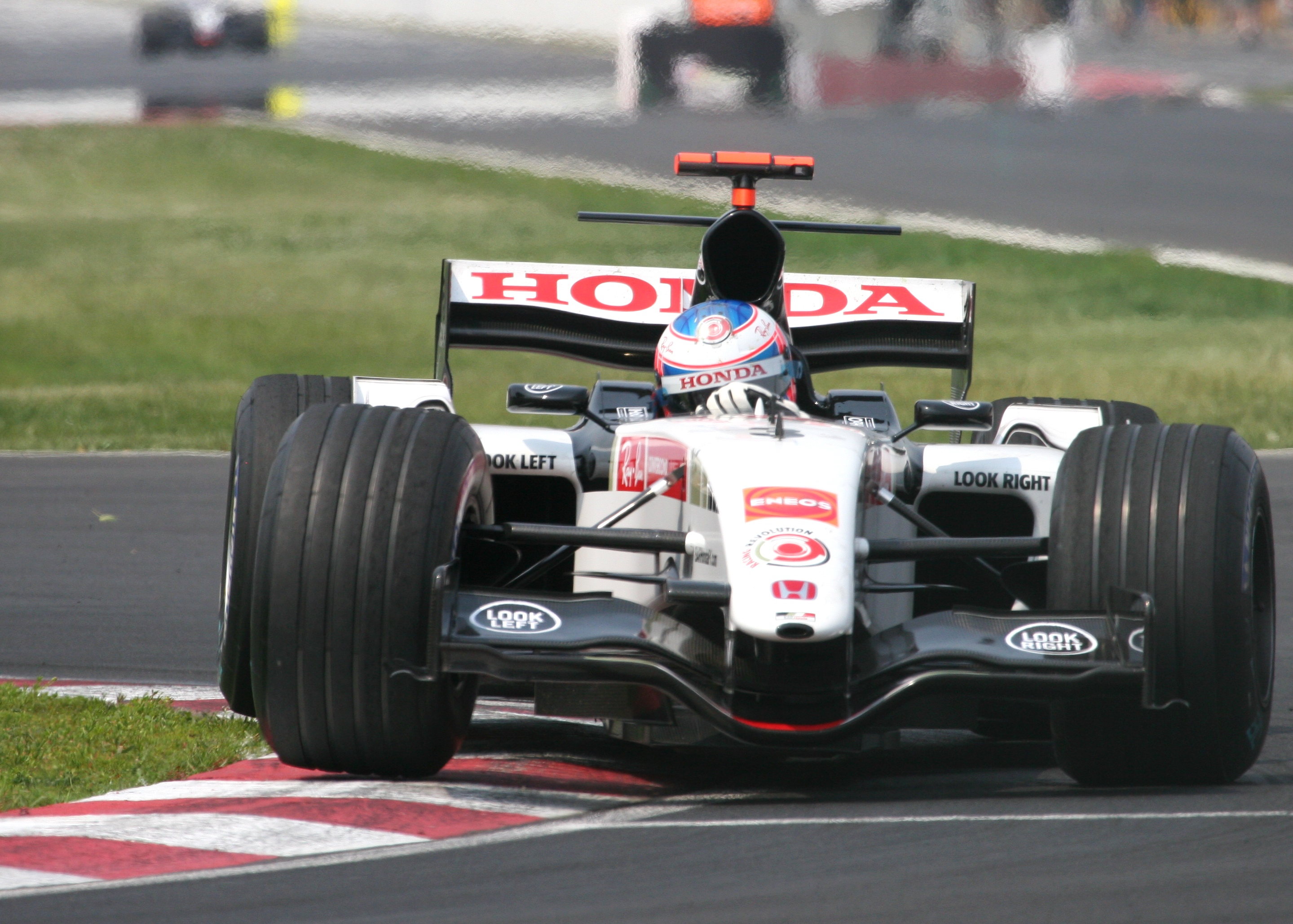
Button at the 2005 Canadian Grand Prix, where he took pole position.

Despite the feud, Button insisted he had BAR's backing, and was optimistic for the 2005 season. He was unable to deal with regulation changes concerning aerodynamics and his car lacked pace as a result. Button was disqualified from third place at the San Marino Grand Prix after race scrutineers found his car had a second fuel tank inside the main one, that when drained, made his car underweight. The FIA International Court of Appeal banned Button and his team from the next two races as a result. Following his return, he took the second pole position of his career in Montreal, but crashed out after an error while running third. After the United States Grand Prix, Button scored in all of the remaining races with two third-place finishes in Germany and Belgium to end the season in ninth place on 37 points.

For the second consecutive year, Button had contract disputes involving BAR and Williams. Button had signed a pre-contract to drive for Williams in 2006, but he now believed his prospects of achieving his maiden Grand Prix victory would be better at BAR, and that his Williams contract was not binding. Frank Williams insisted the contract was fully binding, and that there would be "absolutely no turning back"; his team required Button to fulfill some contractual obligations with sponsors. (Note: Button's contract with Williams stipulated he had to score less than 75 per cent of points accumulated by the leader of the Drivers' Championship before the Turkish Grand Prix to join the team for 2006.) After several weeks of talks, Williams agreed to release Button in exchange for an estimated £18 million in compensation.

==== Honda (2006–2008) ====
===== 2006 =====
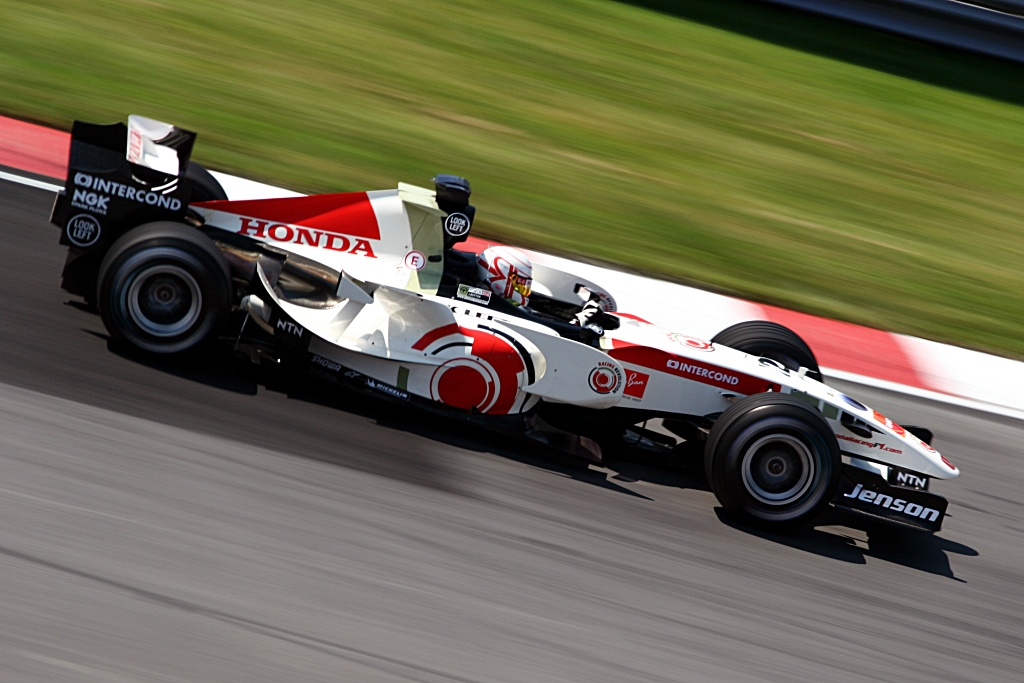
Button driving the Honda RA106 which he drove to victory at the 2006 Hungarian Grand Prix.

BAR was renamed Honda prior to 2006 following a buyout by the Japanese manufacturer and Button was partnered by the experienced Rubens Barrichello. Honda granted Button equal status and neither man received preferential treatment. The new team performed well in testing, helped by the extra resources now available from Honda, and Button was confident in the car. He had been frustrated by not converting his increasing experience and confidence in his driving into success in 2005 and was excited about Honda's car and engine development enabling race victory challenges. Button scored points in five of the first eleven races, finishing third at the second round, the Malaysian Grand Prix, and pole position for the following Australian Grand Prix. The first win of his career was at a rain-affected Hungarian Grand Prix from a fourteenth position start – the 113th Grand Prix start of his career. Button finished fourth or fifth at each of the next five races and ended the season with a podium finish at the final round in Brazil. Over the last six races of the season, he scored more points (35) than any other driver.

===== 2007 =====
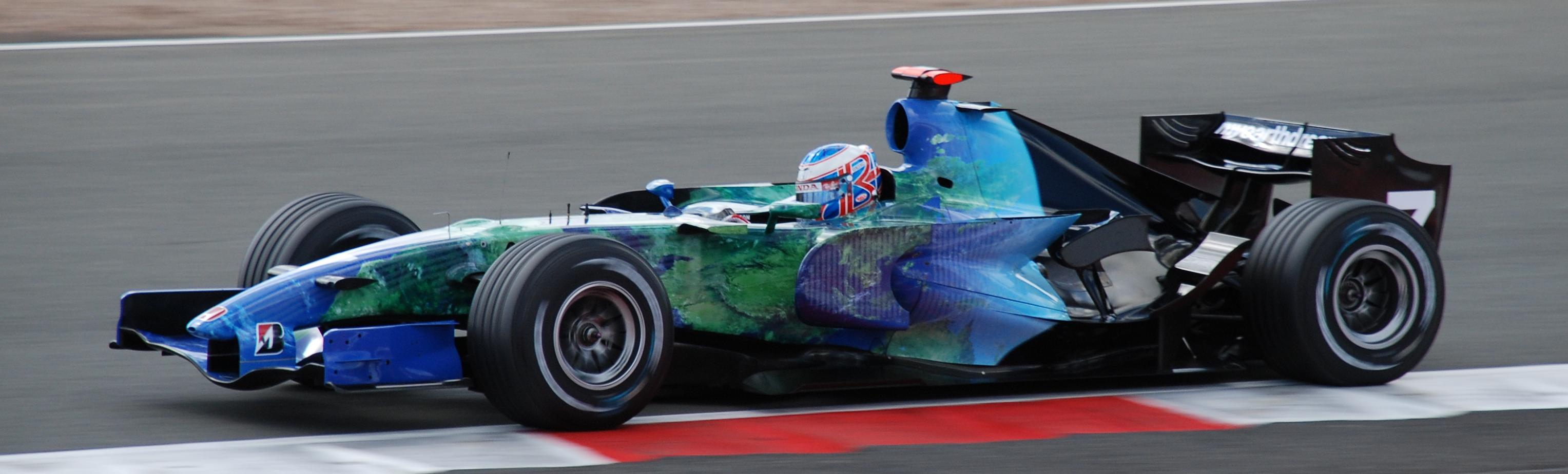
Button driving for Honda at the 2007 Chinese Grand Prix.

In 2007, Button again drove with Honda alongside Barrichello. He was unable to partake in pre-season testing because of two hairline fractures to his ribs, sustained in a karting incident in late 2006. His Honda RA107 car had an aerodynamic imbalance from lacking grip after Shuhei Nakamoto was appointed Senior Technical Director following the departure of Geoff Willis. His year was worse than in 2006, driving within the middle of the field and usually qualifying outside of the top ten. He scored six points over the course of the season for fifteenth overall with a best finish of fifth at the rain-affected Chinese Grand Prix.

===== 2008 =====
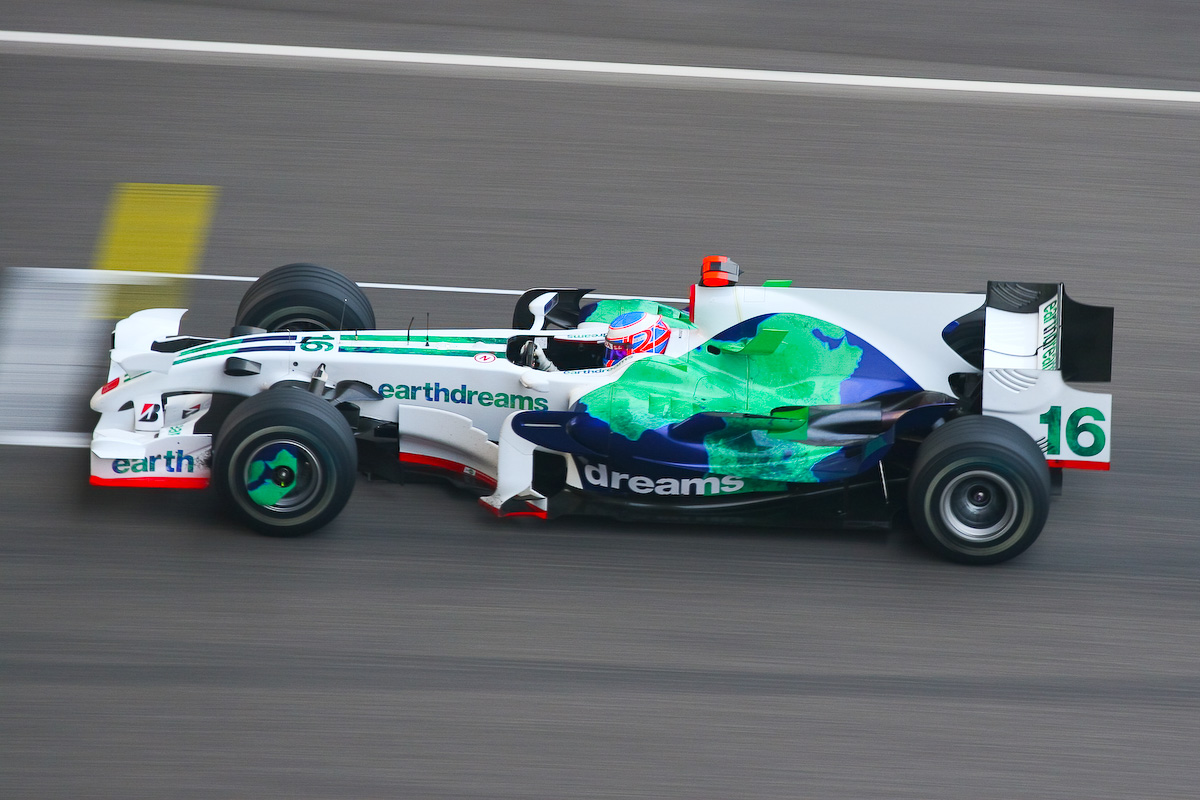
Button driving for Honda at the 2008 Chinese Grand Prix.

Button stayed with Honda for 2008, and continued to be partnered by Barrichello. He and a group of friends went to Lanzarote to establish a base to train for the upcoming season. Button was confident since the technical director Ross Brawn became Honda's team principal and noticed wind tunnel designs of the car. Button began working with human performance coach Michael Collier that year. The Honda RA108 proved to be uncompetitive, and he scored three points that year because he finished sixth at the Spanish Grand Prix.

On the morning of 4 December 2008, the 2008 financial crisis caused Honda to withdraw from F1, leaving Button's chances of a drive in 2009 dependent on the team finding a buyer. He was informed of the news by Goodard the day before and Button changed his plans to discuss the withdrawal with colleagues and not the performance of his 2009 car. He declined an offer to drive for Red Bull Racing's junior team Toro Rosso because they would not give him a podium-winning car and they wanted sponsorship funding.

==== Brawn GP (2009) ====
Brawn purchased the Honda team for a nominal fee and renamed it as Brawn GP in early March 2009. Button signed a contract to drive for the team in 2009, and took a pay cut as part of the agreement. Although he was installed by bookmakers as a 100–1 outsider for the championship, Button's Brawn BGP 001 car was quick and reliable in pre-season testing in Europe due to an efficient aerodynamic package, a powerful Mercedes-Benz V8 engine and grippy slick tyres. The car's seat was lowered to make him comfortable.

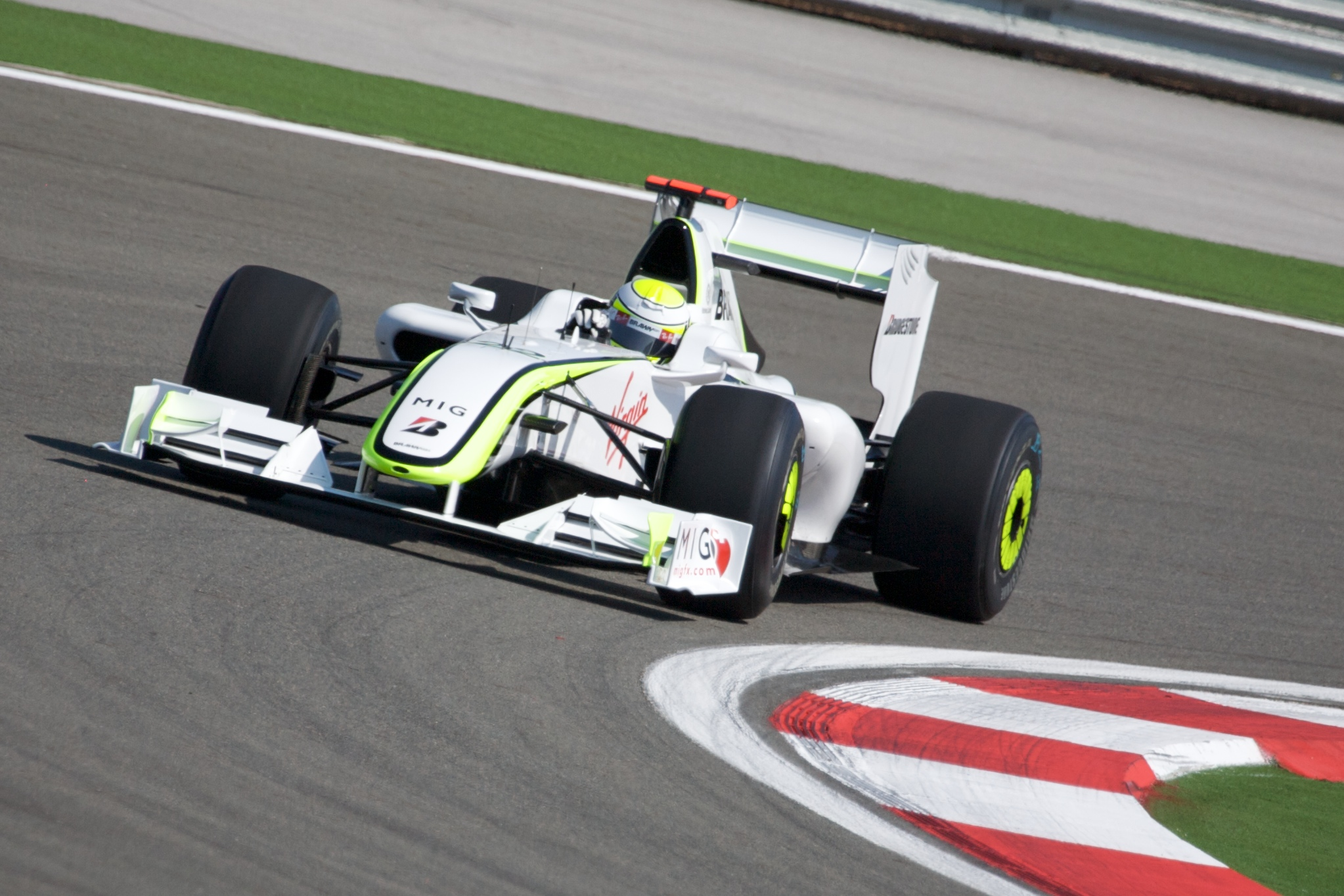
The Brawn BGP 001 car that Button drove to win the 2009 championship

Button won six of the first seven races with four pole positions, having benefited from a double diffuser design making him and the Toyota and Williams teams faster than others. (Note: Button matched the achievement set by former world champions Alberto Ascari, Juan Manuel Fangio, Jim Clark and Schumacher.) Once the major teams had introduced their own reconfigured diffusers Button's dominance ended, averaging sixth position in the following ten races and scoring 35 points after accumulating 61 in the first seven. This was due to the team spending 10 per cent of its allocated £7 million budget on developing the car and Button's smooth driving style preventing him from generating heat into its tyres in cold weather. At the Brazilian Grand Prix, Button was hampered in qualifying by a poor choice of tyres in the wet weather and could achieve 14th position. His championship campaign was boosted by Vettel qualifying 16th, but team-mate and closest rival Barrichello qualified on pole. In the race, Button finished fifth, taking enough points to secure the championship with one round remaining. (Note: With 169 starts, Button made the second-highest number of race starts before becoming World Champion. Only Nigel Mansell (with 176 starts) had competed in more races than Button before winning the World Championship.) At the final race of the season, the Abu Dhabi Grand Prix, Button qualified behind Barrichello again, but finished on the podium in third position.

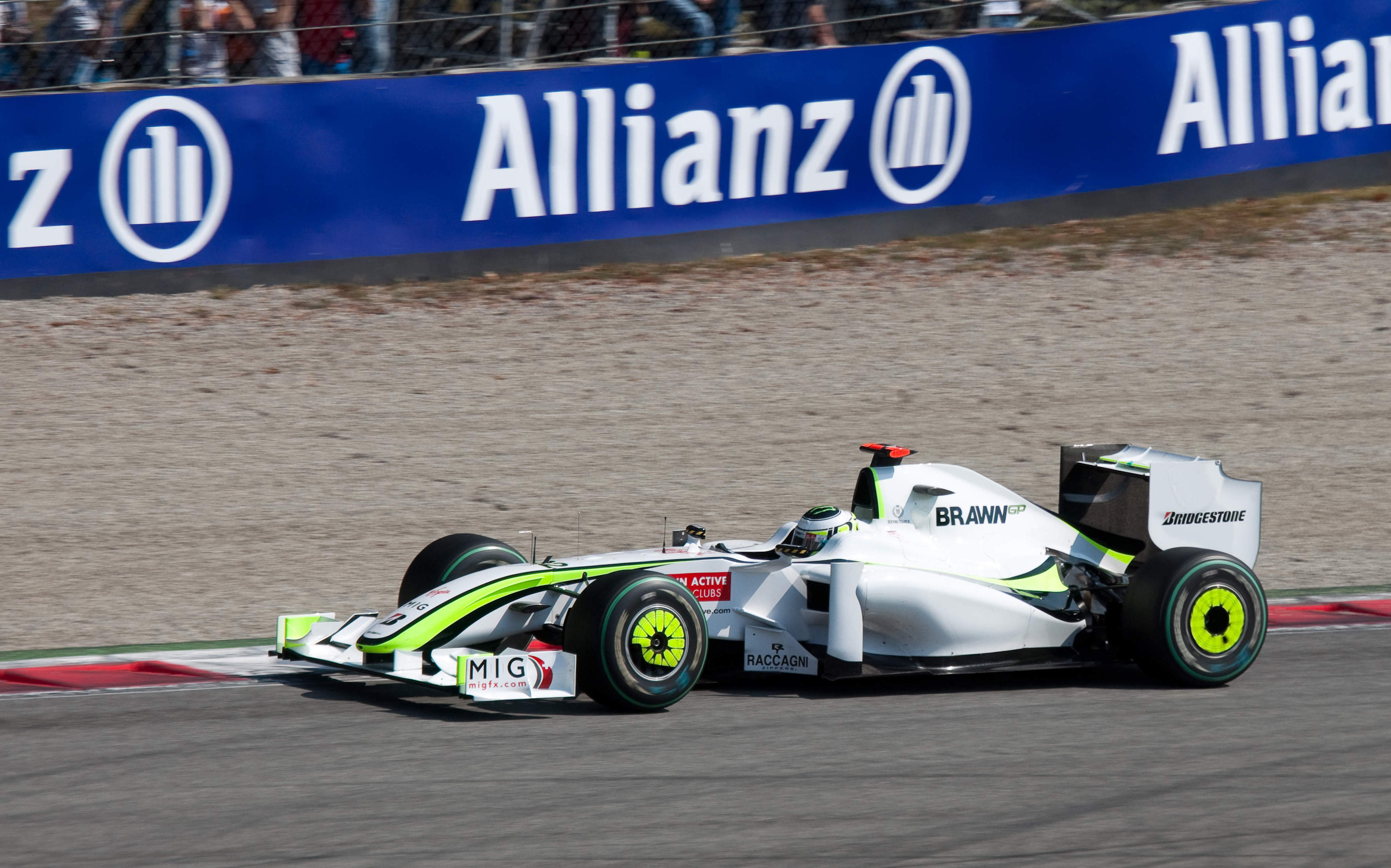
Button at the 2009 Italian Grand Prix

In the off-season, Brawn and team principal Nick Fry informed Button they wanted him to sign an extension to his contract and be paired with Nico Rosberg. Button asked for a commitment to car development for 2010 and a close to a repeat performance of the 2009 season. Brawn and Fry said Mercedes would buy-out Brawn GP without locating potential sponsors, which Button found unappealing and told his manager Richard Goodard he desired a new challenge.

=== McLaren (2010–2017) ===
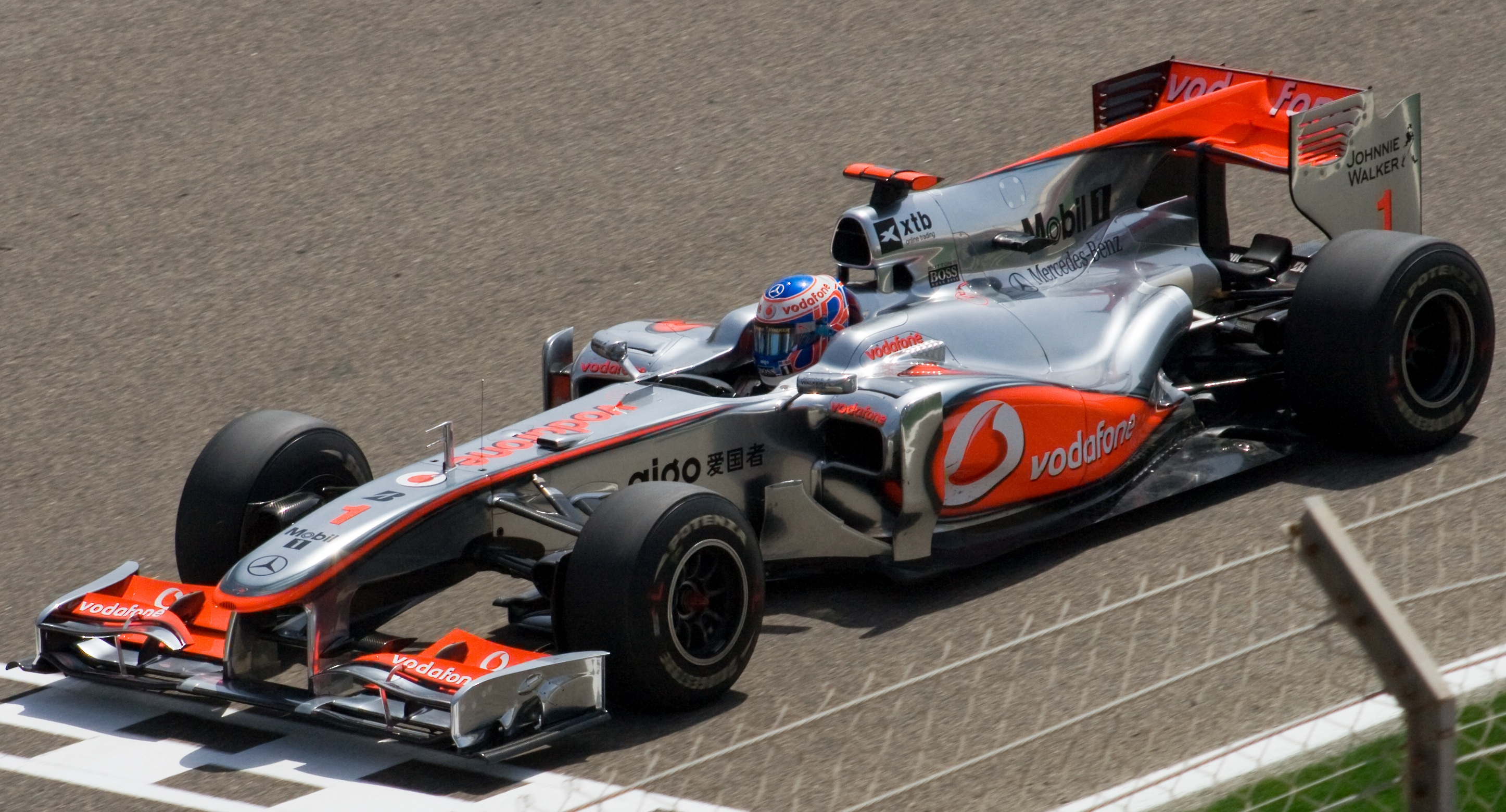
Button's first race for McLaren was the 2010 Bahrain Grand Prix.

Goodard telephoned McLaren team principal Martin Whitmarsh to enquire about a drive for Button. (Note: Whitmarsh noted discord between Button and Brawn from disputes over payment of bonuses from the driver's championship win and spoke to Button about his status after the 2009 Brazilian Grand Prix.) Whitmarsh did not believe Button would leave Brawn GP since they had won the Championship; Goodard mentioned McLaren's competitiveness at the end of 2009 and partnering 2008 world champion Lewis Hamilton appealed to Button. Discussions took place at the team's headquarters in Woking and a three-year deal was signed soon after Kimi Raikkonen had declined a proposal to rejoin to Woking team from Ferrari to go rallying for 2010 instead. Button said he moved because he wanted the motivation and challenge from competing alongside Hamilton, but Whitmarsh cautioned the two before the start of the season he would observe any relationship problems between them.

==== 2010 ====
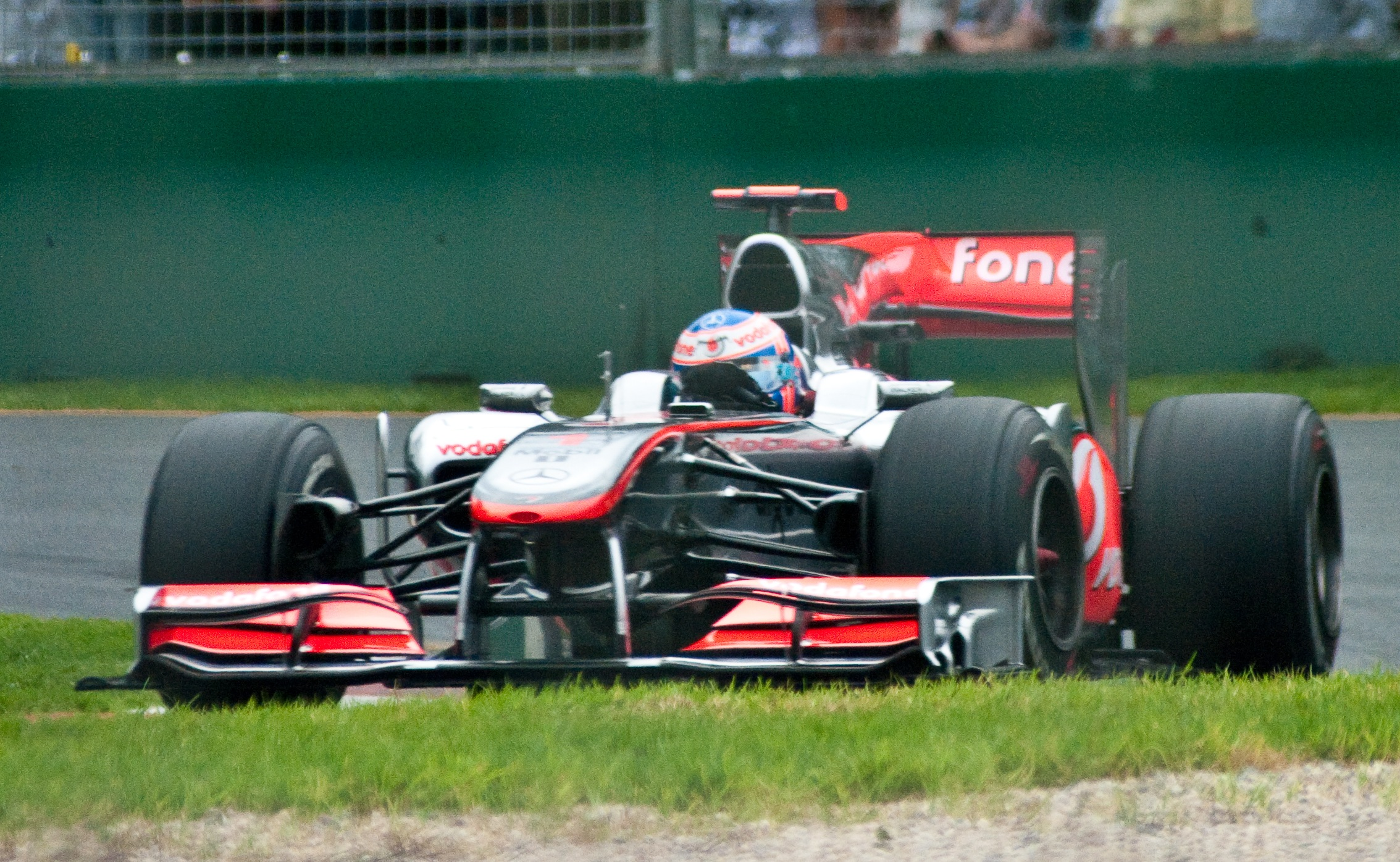
Button took his first victory with McLaren at the 2010 Australian Grand Prix.

Button won at the Australian Grand Prix and the Chinese Grand Prix in variable weather to take the lead of the Drivers' Championship. He later finished second in Turkey after a miscommunication with his team caused him to battle Hamilton for the victory. This cooled his relationship with Hamilton who believed McLaren favoured Button. He followed with two podium finishes and a trio of points scoring finishes to remain in contention for the championship. Button retired at the Belgian Grand Prix after Vettel hit him and punctured the radiator of his car. Second at Monza was followed by a fourth place in both Singapore and Japan. During the Brazilian Grand Prix weekend, Button and his entourage were threatened by a number of criminals in the favelas on his way back from qualifying at Interlagos; nobody was harmed during the incident. Button was mathematically eliminated from retaining the title with a fifth place in the race and took fifth in the championship with third in Abu Dhabi.

==== 2011 ====
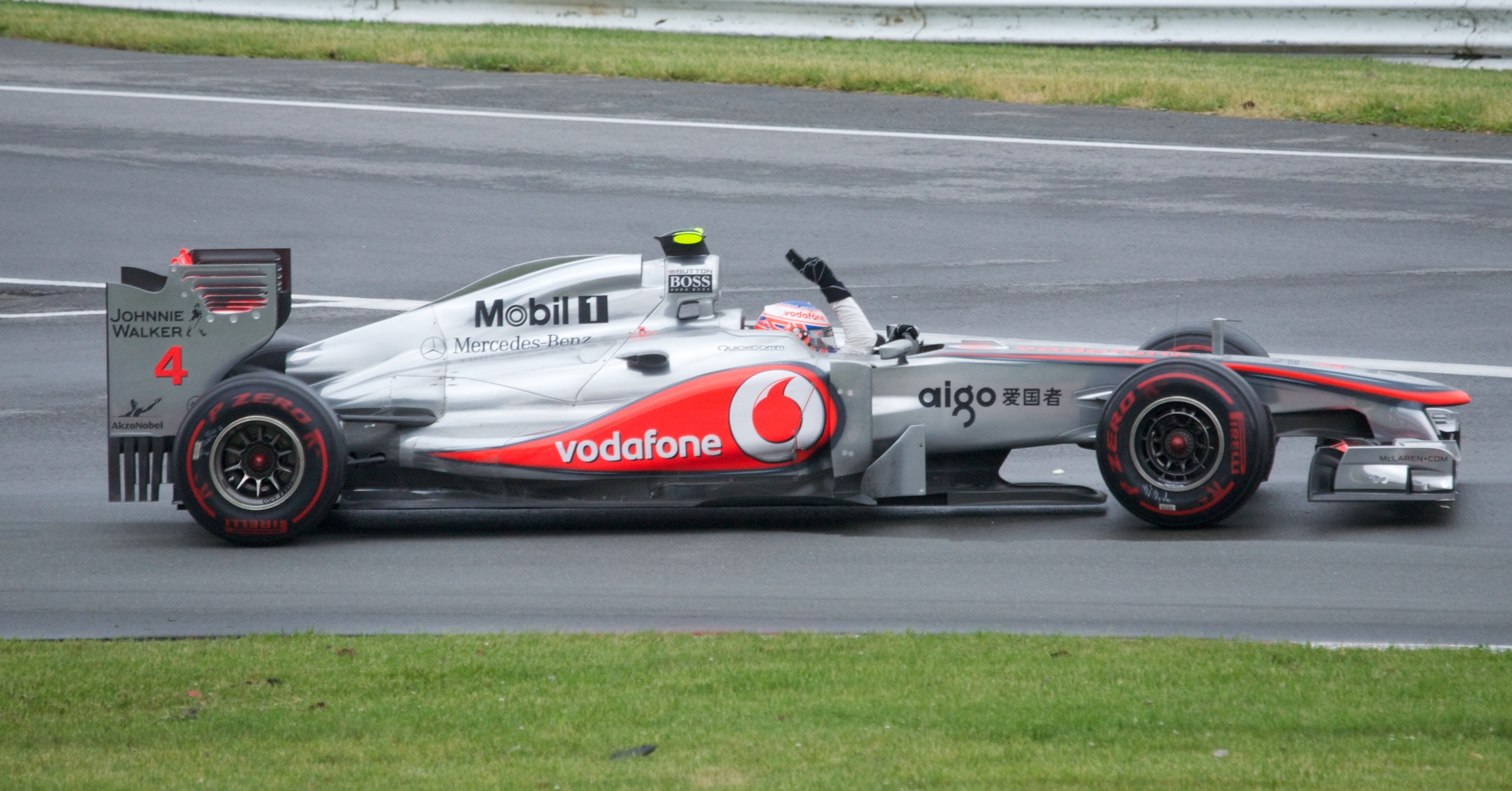
Button celebrating his win of the 2011 Canadian Grand Prix

Button's MP4-26 car for 2011 was built around his taller frame from intra-team input in late 2010. He believed the introduction of Pirelli tyres that season would suit his smooth driving style and said a world championship victory would make it difficult for him to retire from F1. Button began the season by finishing no lower than sixth in the first six races with three podium results. He won the rain-affected Canadian Grand Prix after two collisions dropped him to the back of the field and overtaking Vettel when the latter ran wide on the slippery track on the final lap. Button then won the Hungarian Grand Prix, which was held in similar weather, and the Japanese Grand Prix, but his results over the course of the season mathematically eliminated him from championship contention when Vettel took the title in Japan. Button took three victories and twelve podium finishes to finish runner-up with 270 points.

==== 2012 ====
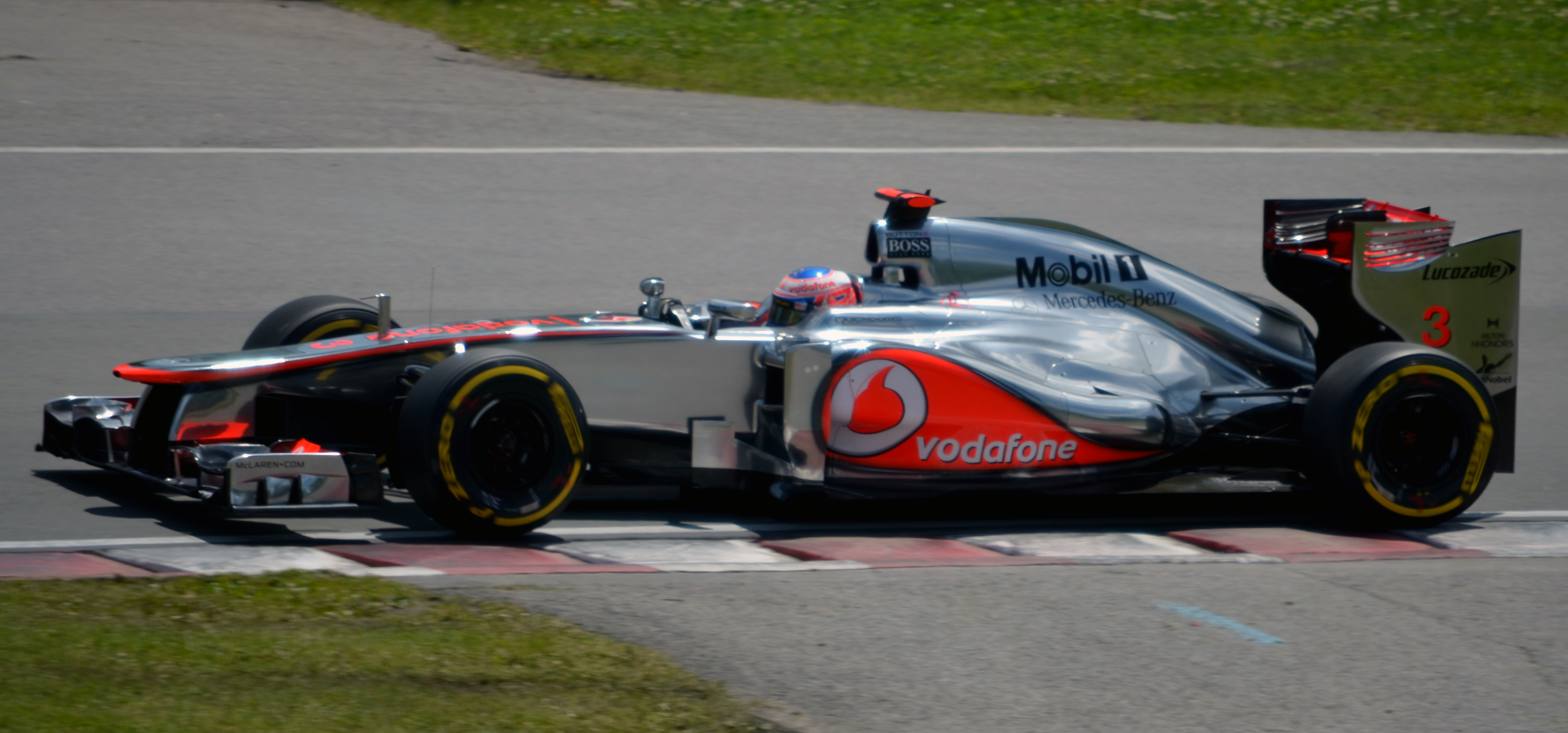
Button practicing for the 2012 Canadian Grand Prix

Whitmarsh wanted Button to remain at McLaren for the next three years while the latter held talks with Ferrari about a race seat in 2013. Before the 2011 Japanese Grand Prix, he signed a three-year extension to his contract with McLaren. (Note: Although the press reported that the contract extension would earn Button £85 million, he states in his autobiography Life to the Limit that this was not the case.) Button was satisfied with the new MP4-27 car due to McLaren finding a regulation loophole banning the blowing of exhaust gases over parts of the vehicle to improve downforce. A victory in the season-opening Australian Grand Prix and two-second-place finishes at the Chinese Grand Prix and the German Grand Prix were the highlights of his first half of the season. His overall performance in the first seven races fell due to difficulty in generating temperature and the correct amount of grip into the new Pirelli short-life front tyres due to his smooth driving style and him switching brake materials multiple times to try and fix the issue made it worse. Button changed the set-up of his car and adapted himself to the tyres to retain temperature for better performance. The rest of Button's season saw him achieve wins in Belgium and Brazil and top-five finishes in five of the next seven rounds for fifth overall with 188 points.

==== 2013 ====
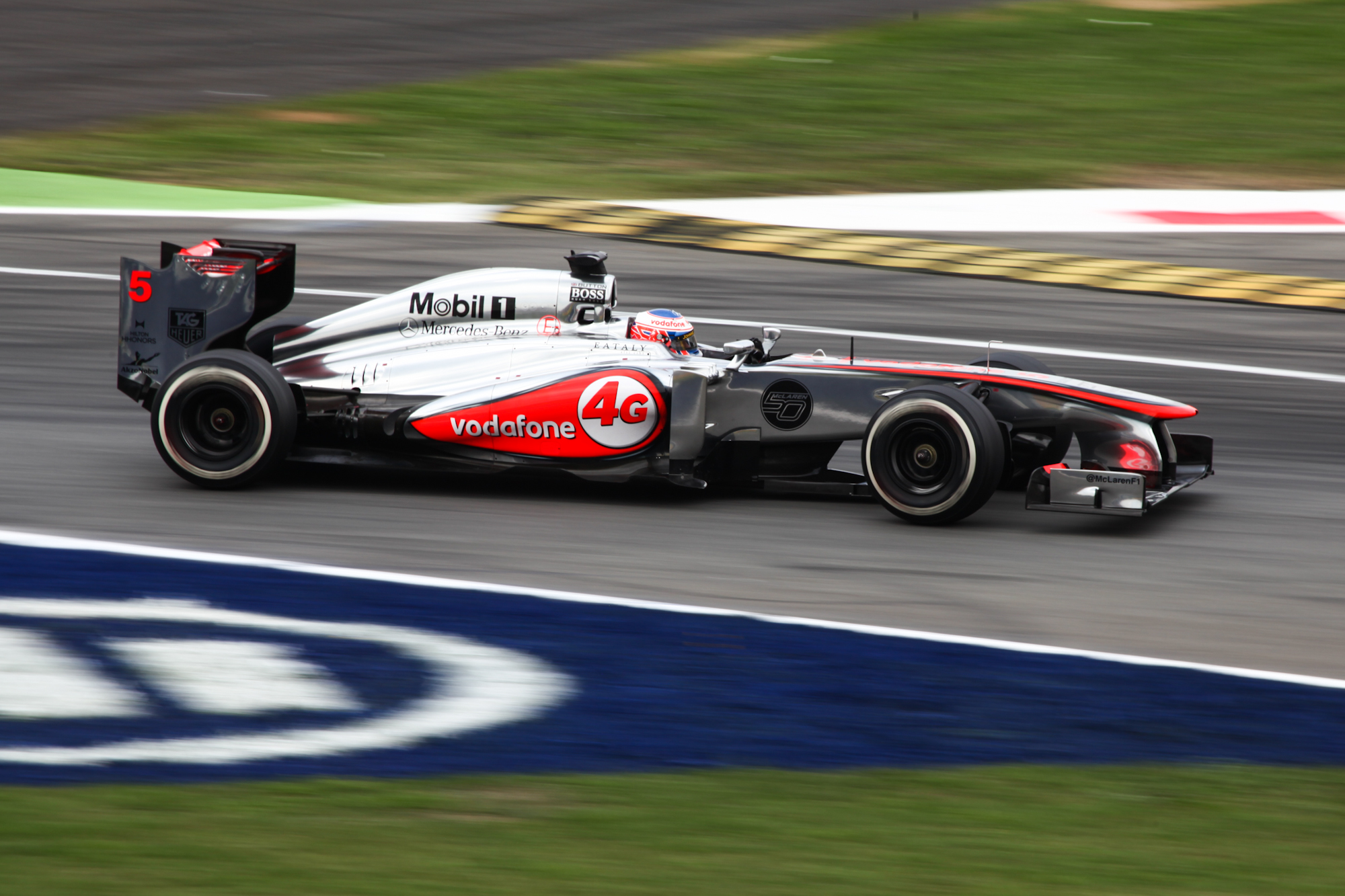
Button driving at the 2013 Italian Grand Prix

Button was joined at McLaren by Ferrari Driver Academy graduate Sergio Pérez for 2013 and their relationship was cooler because the latter entered the team hastily. He was appointed a director of the Grand Prix Drivers' Association (GPDA) in March 2013. McLaren built the MP4-28 car not in advance of regulation changes for 2014, but from scratch. This caused Button to drive an unstable car with understeer, a lack of downforce and severe tyre degradation. After finishing ninth at the season-opening Australian Grand Prix, McLaren introduced components from the MP4-27 onto the MP4-28, which had no significant effect and Button continued to attain sub-par results throughout the season with a best of fourth at the season-ending Brazilian Grand Prix. (Note: Button broke his knuckle at a party before the Japanese Grand Prix attended by figures from the motor racing community. He drove the race in a strap, leaving the services of simulator driver Oliver Turvey and Kevin Magnussen unneeded.) He was ninth overall with 73 points. Button was involved in aggressive driving from his teammate Pérez early in the season in Bahrain and Monaco, annoying him.

==== 2014–2015 ====
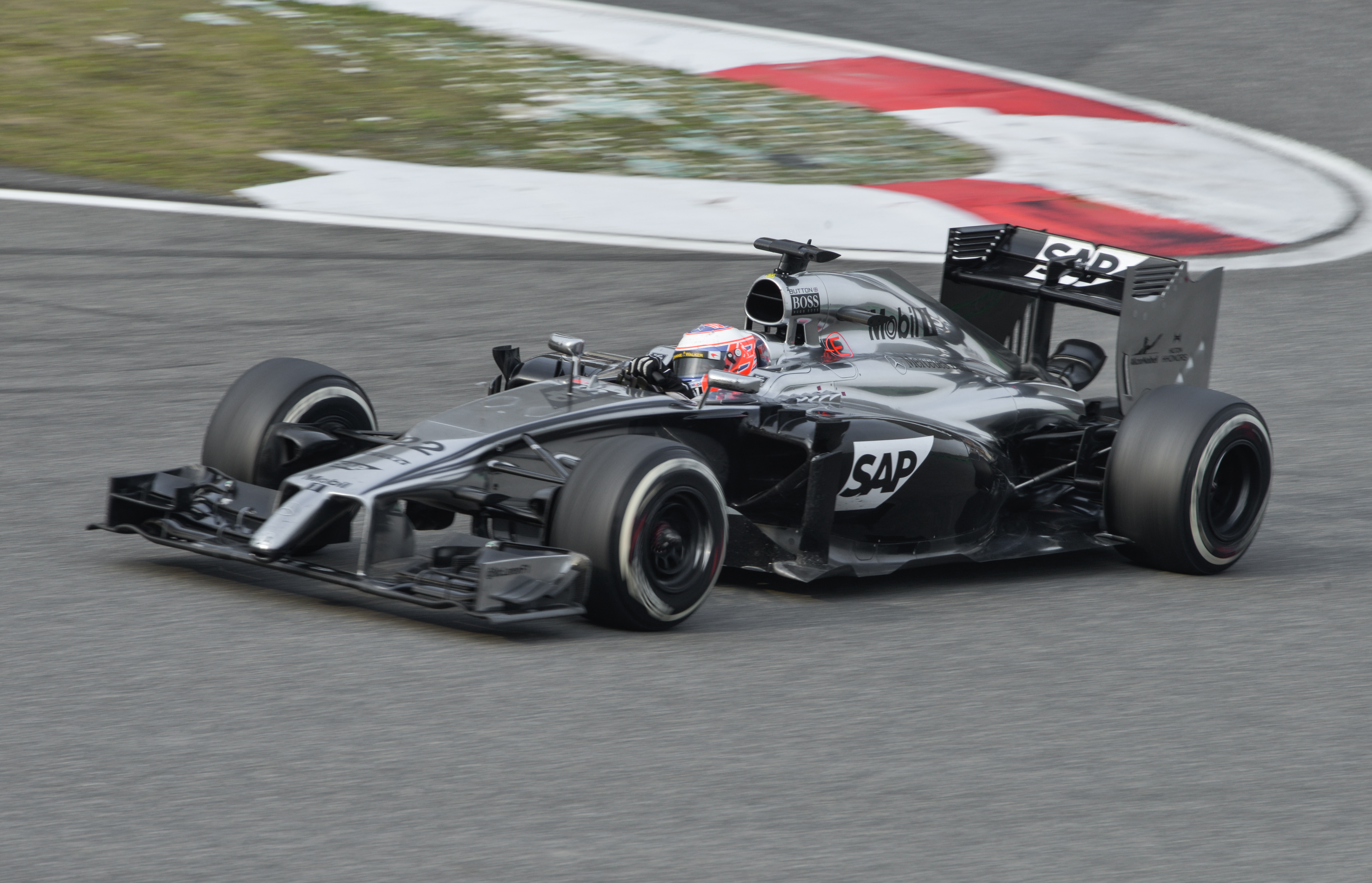
Button competing at the 2014 Chinese Grand Prix

Button activated the terms of his contract to stay with McLaren for 2014 in September 2013, but considered taking a sabbatical from F1 following the unexpected death of his father in Monaco in January 2014. Button was joined by Kevin Magnussen, with whom he was able to build a rapport, and the MP4-29 car had an understeer from lacking front downforce and an unstable rear. He finished third at the season-opening Australian Grand Prix after Red Bull Racing driver Daniel Ricciardo was disqualified for a fuel flow consumption infringement and his team lost a subsequent appeal against the decision. It would turn out to be his final career podium. Button achieved a quartet of fourth-place finishes and scored points seven more times for eighth in the Drivers' Championship and 126 points. Button qualified better than Magnussen ten times and scored twice as many points.

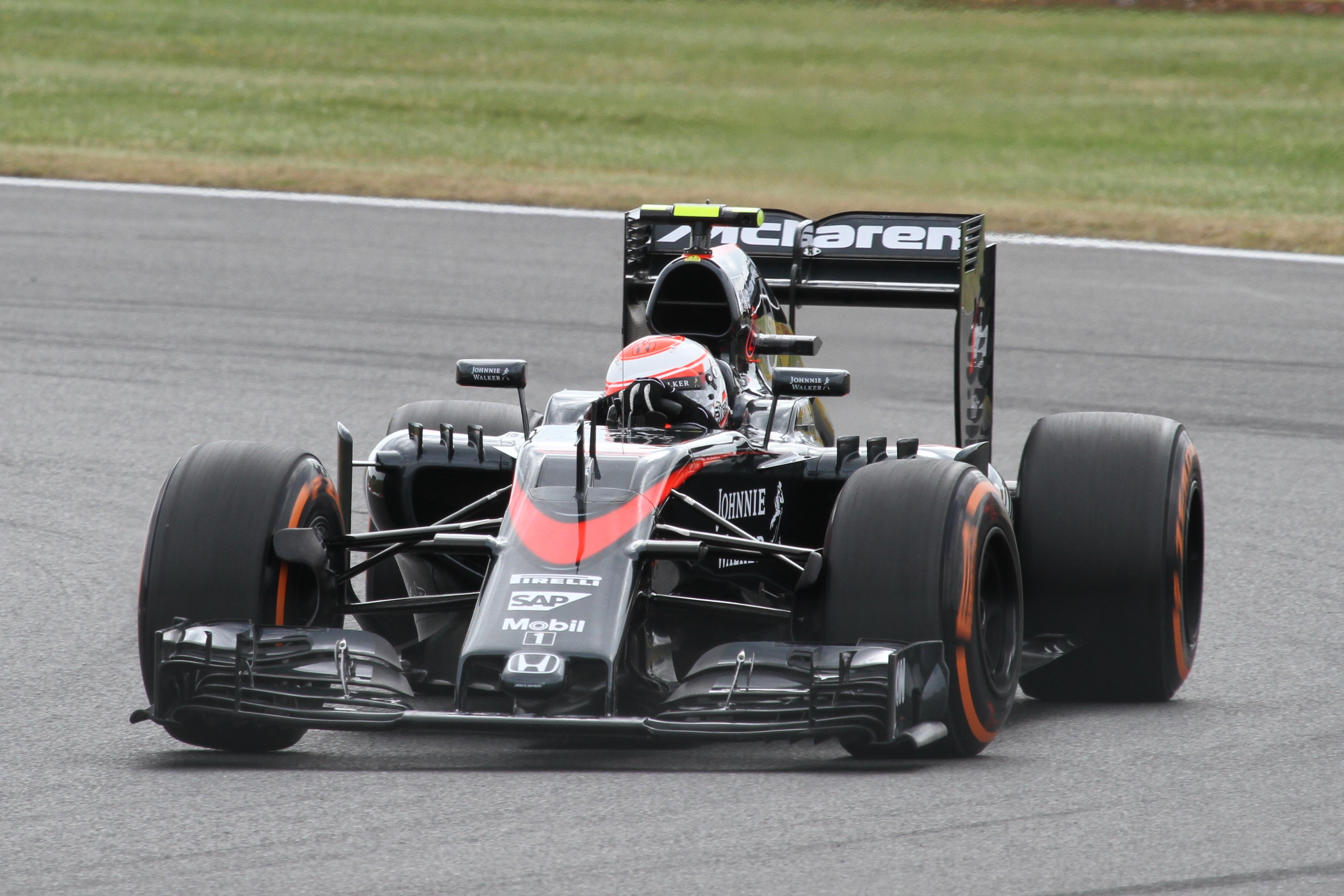
Button driving at the 2015 British Grand Prix

Button became unenthusiastic over F1 and the press speculated on his future in the sport with rumors Alonso would be Magnussen's teammate in 2015. He wanted to remain at McLaren but was made insecure about his career and told himself to concentrate on the present and not be concerned about the future. (Note: Button's manager Richard Goodard received calls from several teams inquiring about Button.) Dennis did not want Button to drive for McLaren but fellow team shareholder Mansour Ojjeh told him Button should remain over Magnussen after reviewing the situation. Negotiations between Button and McLaren racing director Éric Boullier and team owner Ron Dennis concluded with an agreement for Button to continue racing on 10 December. Button agreed to take a pay cut, with his contract containing the option for a second year; McLaren or Button were able to activate clauses to break the contract after the season if one of the parties desired it. (Note: An option for a long-term contract was more complicated for Button because of the team's results from the 2014 season led to debate on each driver's strengths and weaknesses.) Button struggled in 2015 due to an unreliable and an underpowered Honda engine lacking straightline speed, securing four top-ten finishes and a best result of sixth at the United States Grand Prix. He was rarely able to progress past the first qualifying session and took sixteenth in the Drivers' Championship with sixteen points.

==== 2016–2017 ====
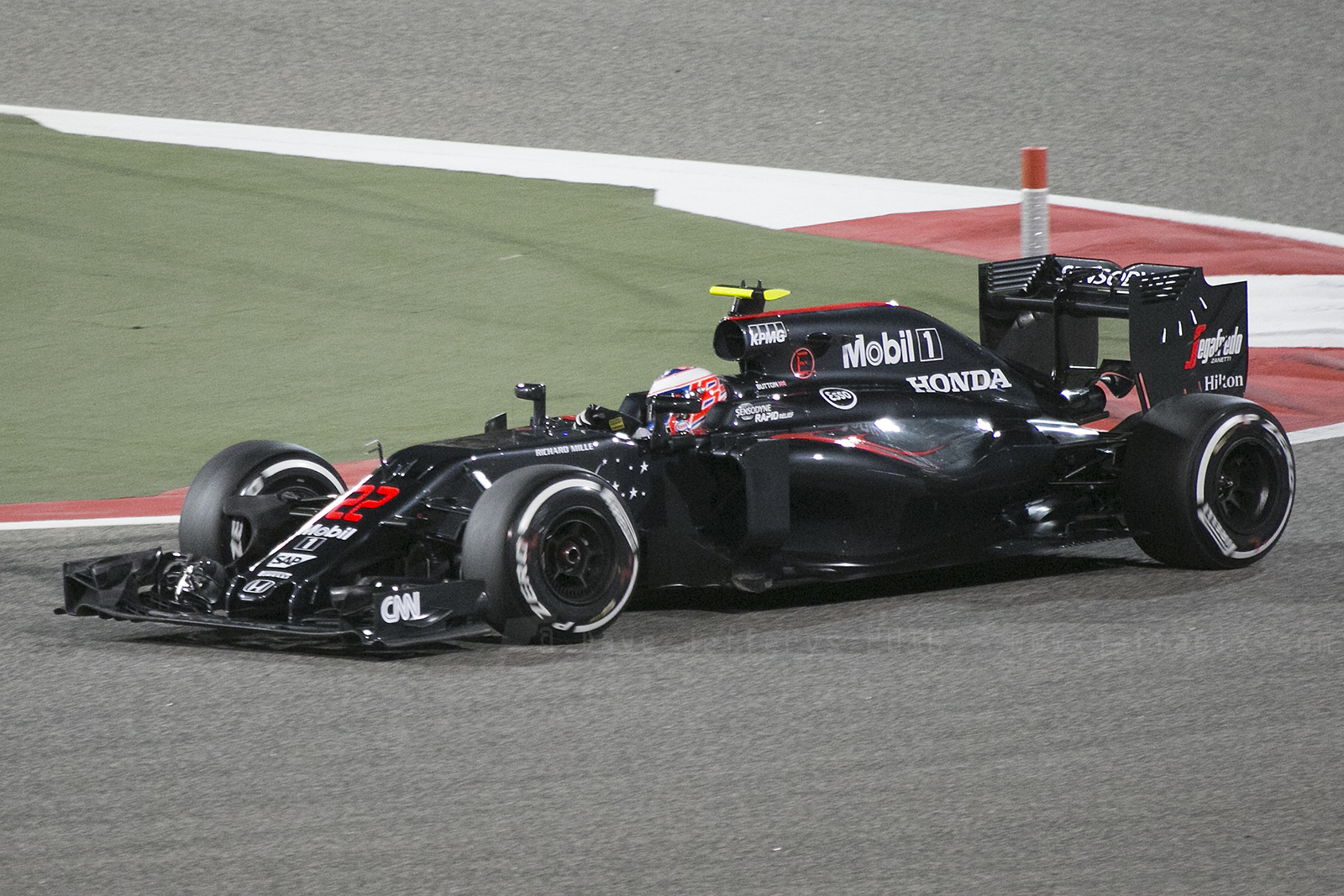
Button competing in the 2016 Bahrain Grand Prix

Button was retained by the McLaren team for 2016 following contractual discussions with Dennis and meetings with aerodynamics and engineers at the McLaren Technology Centre (MTC). Button received a 50 per cent pay rise by staying at McLaren for another year. He had considered returning to the Williams team but decided against it. His car's new Honda engine was more powerful and allowed him to challenge for points-scoring finishes but reliability continued to hinder him and McLaren. He finished fifteen of the 21 races that year, qualifying a season-high third at the Austrian Grand Prix, the highest start for the McLaren-Honda partnership. Button went on to finish the race a season-high sixth. He was unable to finish higher than eighth thereafter and ended his full-time career with a suspension failure at the season-ending Abu Dhabi Grand Prix. Button took fifteenth in the Drivers' Championship with 21 points finishing better than Alonso five times and qualifying higher on four occasions.

Before the Belgian Grand Prix, Button told Dennis he planned to retire after the season. Dennis asked Button to wait before returning for discussion to which he said he had already decided. He suggested Button take a sabbatical and mull over the decision to retire while resting and made Button an ambassador for McLaren. He would work in the team's simulator at MTC, represent them at sponsor functions and attempt to help them in car development. Button was retained by McLaren as reserve driver with the option to return to full-time racing for the team in 2018 if he and McLaren agreed to it. He was replaced as a GPDA director by Romain Grosjean. In April 2017, Boullier asked Button to drive in lieu of the Indianapolis 500-bound Alonso at the Monaco Grand Prix and agreed after Goodard told him there was no way to get out of the commitment because he was contractually bound to drive. He prepared in the team's simulator instead of testing in Bahrain because he would learn nothing by not driving on a narrow street circuit. He retired late in the race following a collision with Sauber driver Pascal Wehrlein that damaged his car.

In November 2017, Button was replaced as McLaren reserve driver by 2017 FIA Formula 3 European champion Lando Norris for 2018. His contract with McLaren expired without renewal at the end of 2017 allowing him to focus on other racing ventures.

=== Williams senior advisor (2021–2025) ===
In January 2021, Button rejoined Williams as a senior advisor on a multi-year deal. He assisted their race and Williams Academy drivers on-track and at the team's headquarters and conducted ambassadorial duties for the team. It was expected that Button would focus on the entire team and not one specific department, but he could not enter Williams' premises due to travel restrictions from the United States. Forthwith, COVID-19 protocols restricted his bonding with the team since he was in the Sky Sports broadcasting bubble.

=== Aston Martin F1 Team Ambassador (2026–present) ===
Ahead of the 2026 season, Button joined Aston Martin F1 Team in a team ambassador role on a multi-year deal, supporting their commercial, media, and partner operations.

== Super GT career ==
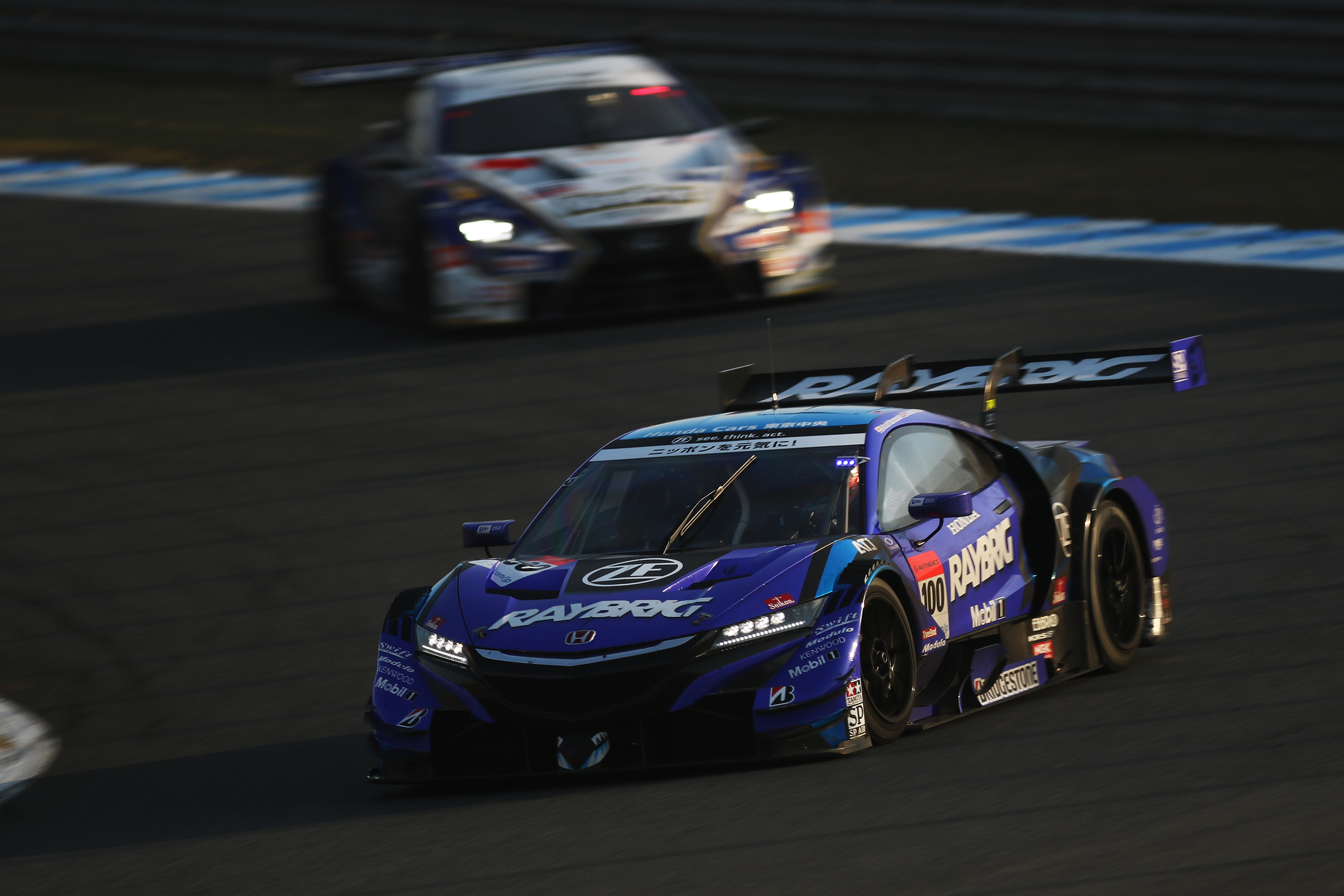
The Honda NSX-GT that Button and Naoki Yamamoto drove to win the 2018 Super GT title.

Button became interested in Super GT in about 2011, and discussions with Honda led to his series debut at the 2017 Suzuka 1000km in a NSX-GT for Team Mugen with teammates Hideki Mutoh and Daisuke Nakajima. The trio finished twelfth following two penalties and two tyre punctures. He also considered racing as a third driver for Acura Team Penske's IMSA SportsCar Championship team, but was rejected. Button drove the full 2018 Super GT Series for Team Kunimitsu in the No. 100 GT500-class Honda NSX-GT alongside Naoki Yamamoto; Button wanted to drive a Bridgestone-shod car and drivers recommended Yamamoto because he speaks English. Button's team helped him to communicate better, adapt to the series and its culture. He and Yamamoto won at Sportsland Sugo and took two-second-place finishes to enter the season-ending race at Twin Ring Motegi equal on points with the TOM'S duo of Ryō Hirakawa and Nick Cassidy. He held off Hirakawa to win the GT500 title by three points and was the first rookie champion since Toranosuke Takagi in 2005.

For the 2019 season, Button remained at Team Kunimitsu alongside Yamamoto in the renumbered No. 1 Honda. In an incident-filled season, Button and Yamamoto were taken out of the lead in the opening round at Okayama, a mistimed safety car at the second Fuji race and a poor tyre choice in the rain at Sugo cost the team possible victories. The pair achieved two podium finishes at both Fuji rounds and a sixth place at Motegi to finish eighth in the GT500 Drivers' Championship with 37 points. In October 2019, he drove the final two races of the season-ending Deutsche Tourenwagen Masters (DTM) round at the Hockenheimring in his Team Kunimitsu NSX car as Honda's wild card entry. He finished ninth in the first race and 16th in the second. Button did not enter the "Super GT × DTM Dream Race" at Fuji Speedway because his contract did not oblige him to do so, and decided to leave Super GT after 2019 because he did not want to fly frequently from the United States to Japan and wanted to explore other racing series.

== Sports car career ==
Button made his endurance racing debut at the 1999 24 Hours of Spa, sharing a BMW Team Raffanelli 320i E46 with David Saelens and Tomáš Enge in the SP class, and retiring after 22 laps with fuel tank failure. Button agreed to drive most of the 2018–19 FIA World Endurance Championship sharing a BR Engineering BR1 car in the Le Mans Prototype 1 (LMP1) class with Vitaly Petrov and Mikhail Aleshin for SMP Racing. (Note: Button missed the season-opening 2018 6 Hours of Spa-Francorchamps because of a Super GT commitment.) Making his FIA World Endurance Championship (WEC) debut at the 2018 24 Hours of Le Mans, electronic problems dropped the car down the order before the team retired with an engine failure late in the race with Button driving at the time. He finished fourth at the 6 Hours of Fuji and third at the following 6 Hours of Shanghai. Button missed the 1000 Miles of Sebring and 6 Hours of Spa-Francorchamps because of Super GT commitments, and the 2019 24 Hours of Le Mans because his fiancée was due to give birth to their first child. (Note: Brendon Hartley and later Stoffel Vandoorne drove in Button's place for the rest of the season.) He left the series after observing the lack of manufacturers entering LMP1 and he wanted to wait for the new car regulations to be introduced.

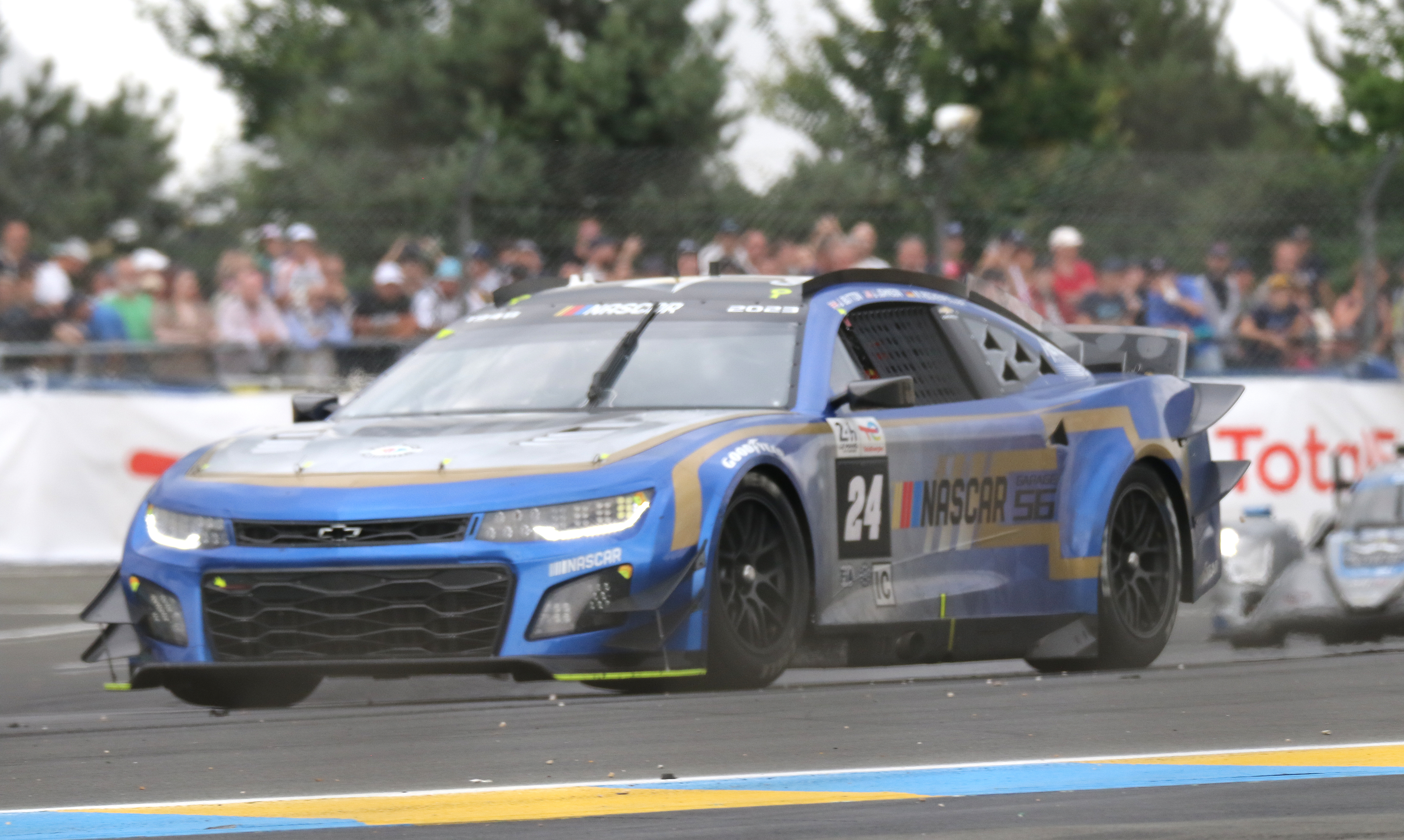
The No. 24 Camaro ZL1 driven by Button, Johnson, and Rockenfeller at the 2023 24 Hours of Le Mans

Button made his British GT debut in the 2020 season's final round, the three-hour Silverstone 500, sharing the No. 3 Jenson Team Rocket RJN McLaren 720S GT3 with team co-owner Chris Buncombe in a one-off appearance. The two finished the race in fourteenth position. Button drove Hendrick Motorsports's NASCAR Next Gen Chevrolet Camaro ZL1 Garage 56 entry alongside sports car driver Mike Rockenfeller and NASCAR racer Jimmie Johnson at the 2023 24 Hours of Le Mans. The trio completed 285 laps and were 39th overall following a drive line fault late in the event. He entered the ten-hour Petit Le Mans (part of the IMSA SportsCar Championship) driving JDC–Miller MotorSports' Porsche 963 alongside Rockenfeller and Tijmen van der Helm after broadcasting commitments prevented his entry to the Sahlen's Six Hours of The Glen. The car started ninth and finished fifth.

For the 2024 24 Hours of Daytona, Button joined Louis Delétraz, Colton Herta and Jordan Taylor in sharing Wayne Taylor Racing with Andretti's No. 40 Acura ARX-06 GTP car, finishing third overall. He returned to the WEC in 2024 and shared Team Jota's No. 38 Porsche 963 with Phil Hanson and Oliver Rasmussen, deciding at the conclusion of 2023 to focus on one series. Button appeared to be slower than his teammates and seemed frustrated with slower cars until he came more comfortable by the 24 Hours of Le Mans. He finished the season nineteenth in the World Endurance Drivers' Championship, achieving five points-scoring finishes that included a season-best result of sixth at the 6 Hours of Fuji.

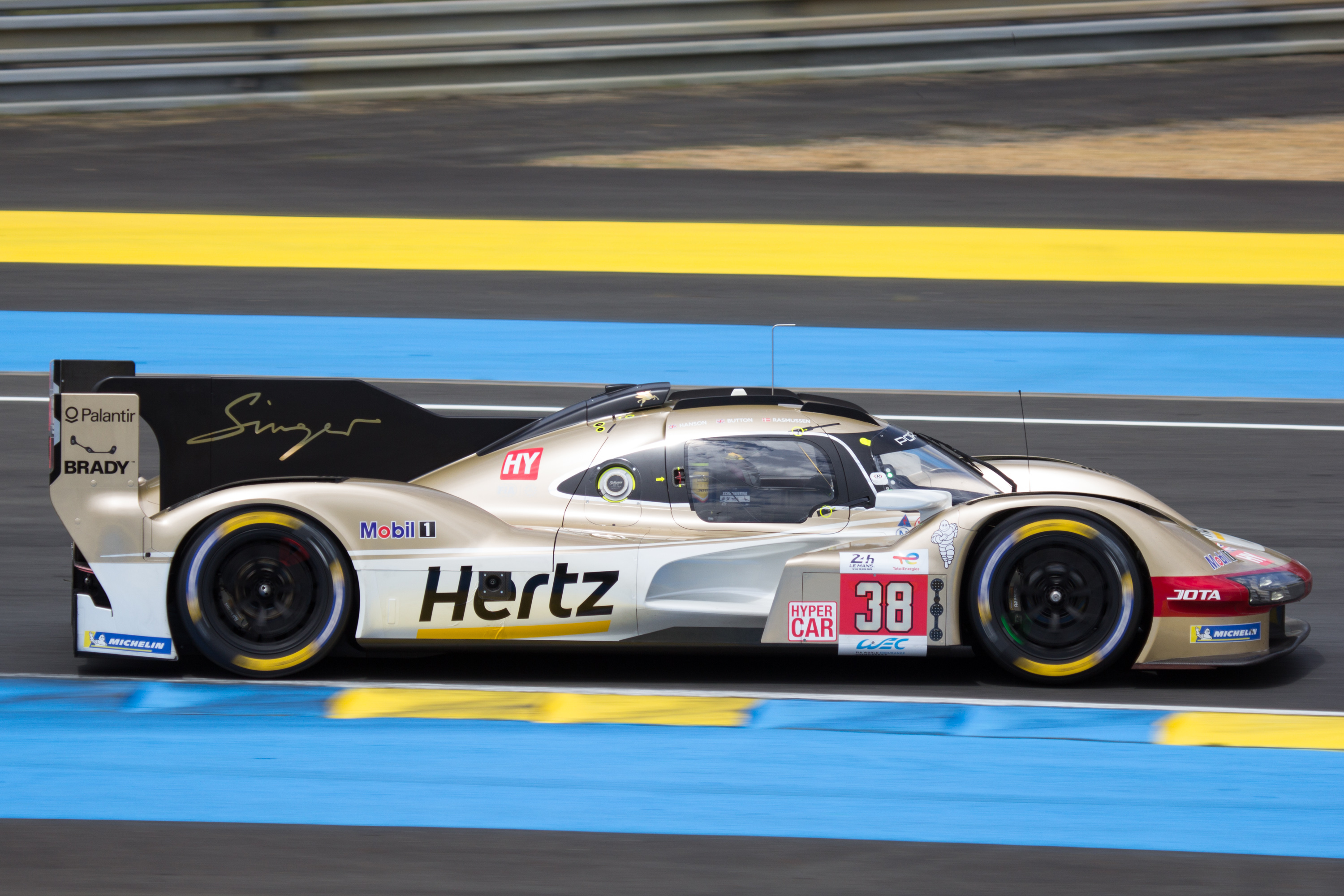
The No. 38 Porsche 963 driven by Button, Hanson, and Rasmussen at the 2024 24 Hours of Le Mans

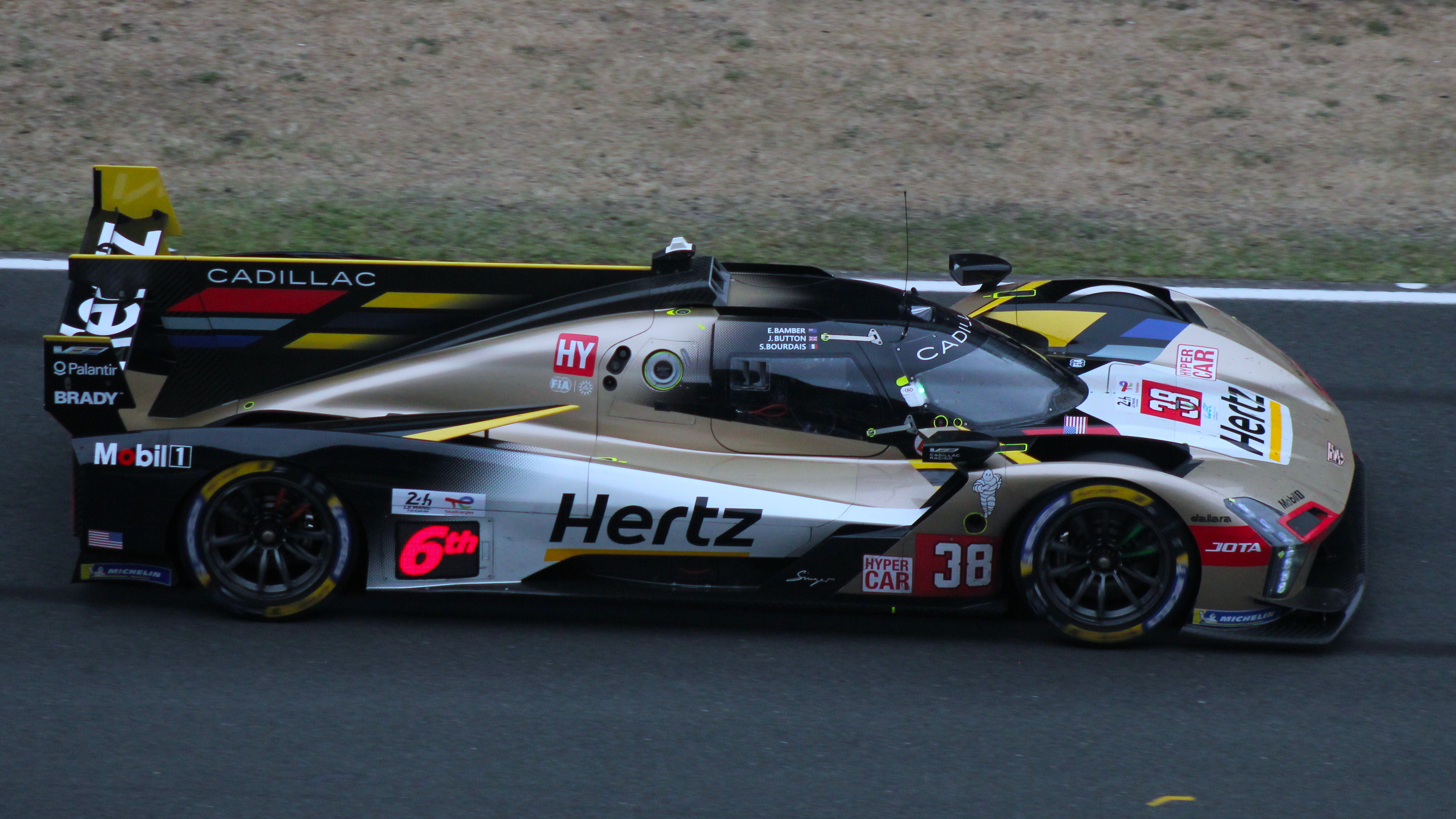
Button's No. 38 car at the 2025 24 Hours of Le Mans

Button remained at Jota for the 2025 FIA World Endurance Championship and shared the No. 38 Cadillac V-Series.R with Earl Bamber and Sébastien Bourdais in the Hypercar category after the team changed manufacturers from Porsche to Cadillac. His teammates helped him in making suggesting adjustments to adapt his driving style to the Cadillac, which better suited him. In eight races, Button finished in the top-ten four times, including a WEC career-best second-place result at the 6 Hours of São Paulo. He was tenth in the World Endurance Drivers' Championship, scoring 46 points. Having considered retirement halfway through the season, Button ended his professional racing career after the 8 Hours of Bahrain. He cited a lack of time to commit to another full WEC season while raising a family.

== Other racing ventures ==
Button was invited to the Race of Champions six times: (Note: Button was replaced by touring car driver James Thompson for the 2006 Race of Champions after Button was injured in a karting accident.) in 2007, 2008, 2009, 2011, 2015 and 2017, reaching the semi-finals of the Nations Cup with Andy Priaulx for Team Autosport in 2007 and 2008 and finishing second in 2009. His best performance in the Race of Champions were the semi-finals in 2009. In 2019, Button drove off-road races in a Rocket Motorsports-entered Brenthel Industries Spec 6100 TT class truck with Buncombe and managing director Mazen Fawaz his co-drivers. This came about when Button told Buncombe they would race the Baja 1000 as Buncombe's 40th birthday present and sought vehicle components. Navigated by Terry Madden, he finished no higher than the top-20 in the Mint 400 with retirements in the Vegas to Reno and the Baja 1000.

In 2020, while motor racing was suspended due to the COVID-19 pandemic, Button participated in eSports races. In January 2021, Button launched JBXE to compete in the all-electric SUV off-road racing series Extreme E from the 2021 season on. (Note: He replaced himself with Kevin Hansen for the 2021 Ocean X-Prix so he could focus on his role as team principal.) He stopped driving after one round to focus on managing his team and replaced himself with Kevin Hansen. Button made his first foray into historic racing at the 2021 Goodwood Revival, partaking in the Stirling Moss Trophy and the Royal Automobile Club TT Celebration races. He was set to drive an FC1-X car for the Xite Energy Racing team in the all-electric Group E category for the 2022–23 season of the off-road Nitro Rallycross series. However, he withdrew from the rest of the season after one round.

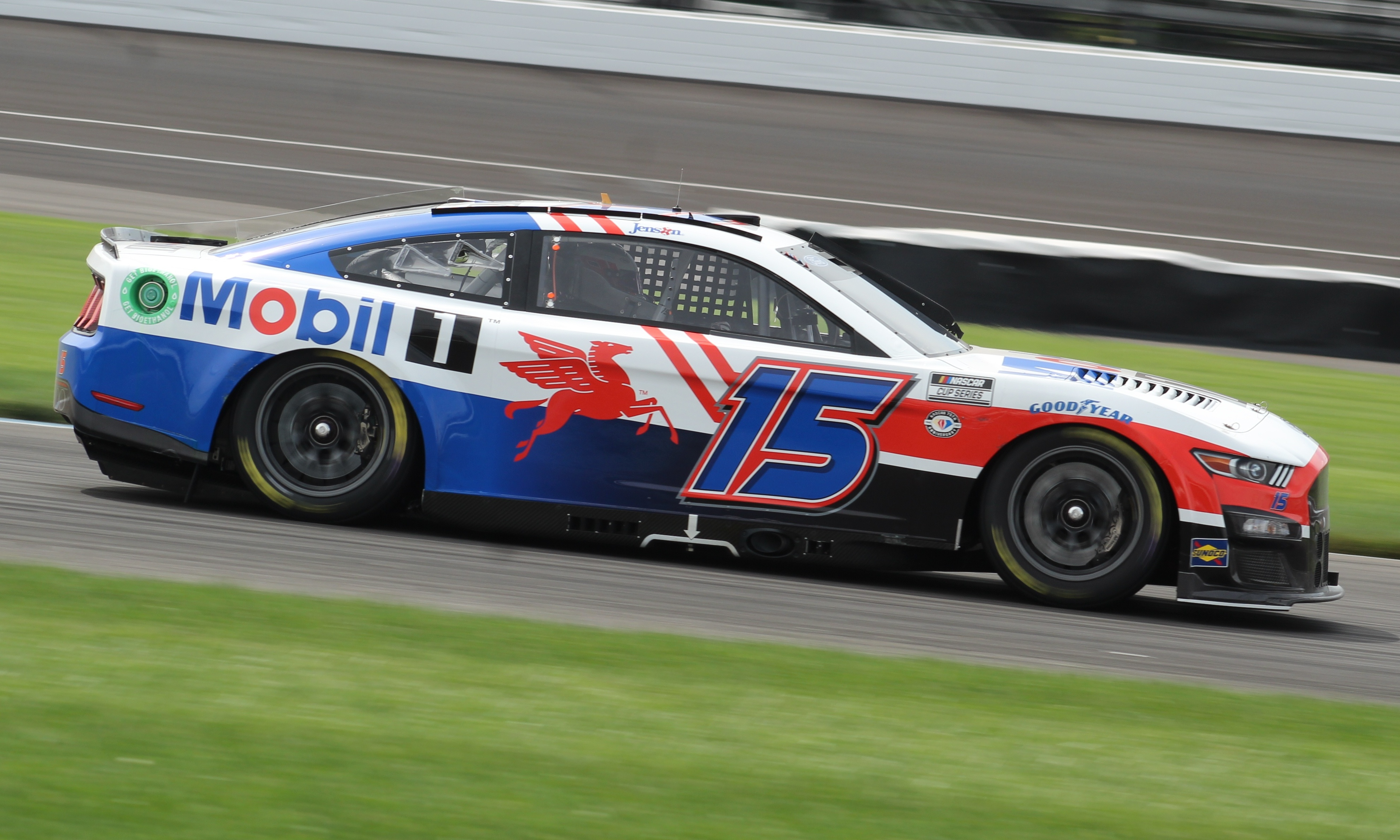
Button's No. 15 car at Indianapolis in 2023.

Button ran three NASCAR Cup Series races in 2023 for Rick Ware Racing in the No. 15 car, starting with the 2023 EchoPark Automotive Grand Prix at Circuit of the Americas (COTA). His best result over the three races was eighteenth position at COTA.

== Driving style ==
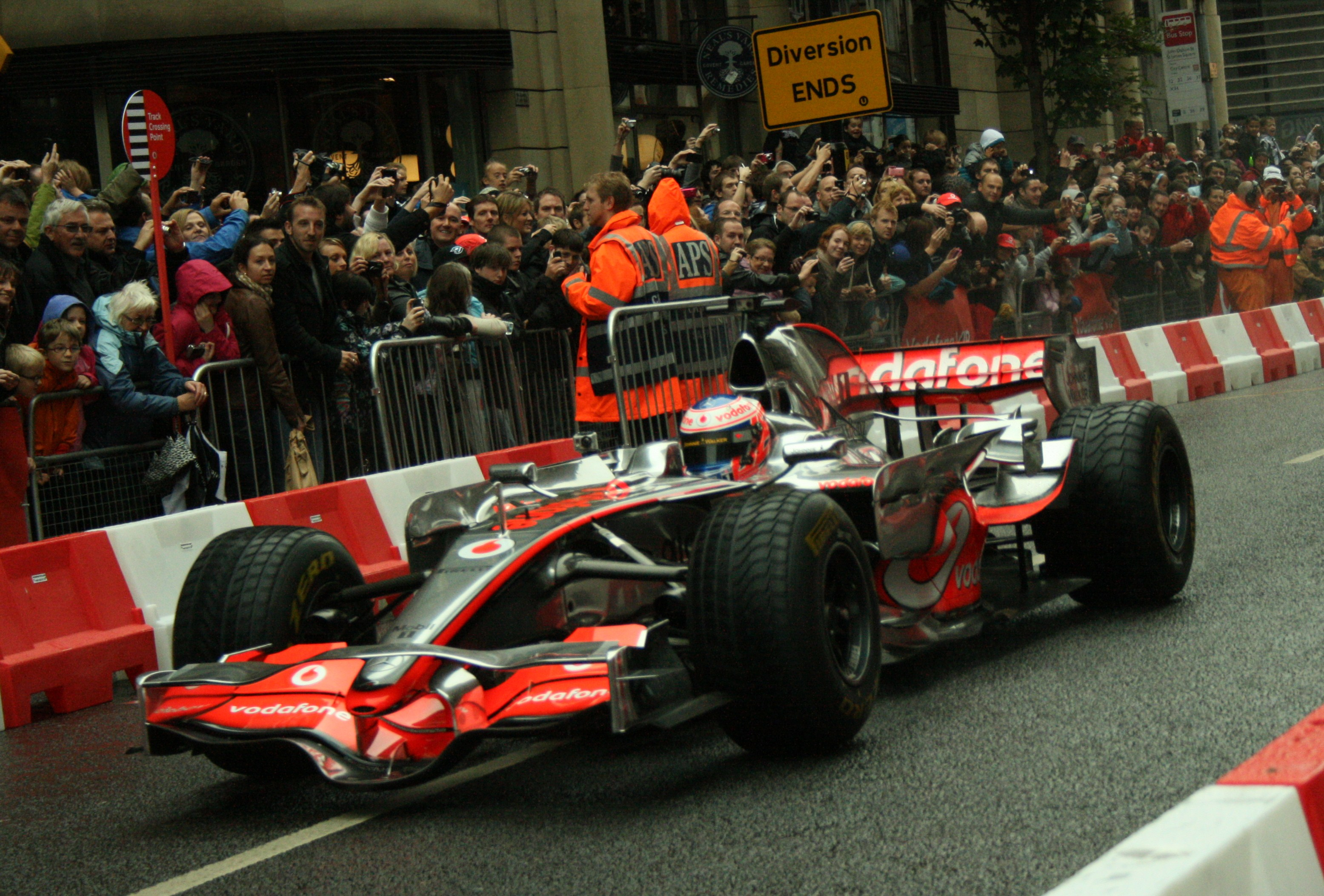
Button driving a McLaren MP4-23 car through the streets of Manchester in August 2011.

Button has a smooth driving style; journalist Mark Hughes wrote in 2009:

Button has a fantastic feel for how much momentum can be taken into a corner and this allows him to be minimal in his inputs—his steering and throttle movements in particular tend to be graceful and beautifully co-ordinated.

This allows him to perform well in wet-weather where the front of the car tends to slide more than the rear, and many believe his smooth style better preserves the tyres during a race. He adapted his style in go-karts and transferred it to more powerful machinery. Since 2000, Button has braked with his left foot, by dragging the brake pedal and stopping the car in less time to control and modulate power. He likes to turn into a corner early under braking and balance the car on pedal application and steering, creating more strain in tyre loads for a longer physical lap but allowing for a higher minimum corner entry speed and allowing Button to adapt to a changeable or slippery track.

Button is comfortable driving a car with understeer, prefers the rear to be stable into corners and on which he is able to lean on leaving them, and rarely locks the inside of his front tyres. His smooth driving also means he cannot generate the necessary tyre temperature on a cool track. Button occasionally cannot get his tyres to operate efficiently over a single lap in qualifying because his gentle steering produces less energy into the wheel. His driving gave him additional thought time and be less prone to making an error for improved consistency in races and notices events without the team necessarily instructing him on what to do. Button accurately exploits grip on a damp corner to adapt to his limits earlier than other drivers. Between 2001 and 2007, when traction control was legal in F1, he was able to control the throttle pedal to prevent wheelspin, allowing him to be as fast due to his feel for grip exiting a turn.

=== Driver number ===
For the 2014 season, the FIA created a new sporting regulation allowing a driver to select a unique car number for use throughout their F1 career. Button chose the number 22, which was the one he was assigned in his 2009 championship season.

== Endorsements and philanthropy ==
The BBC signed Button to promote its BBCi digital television interactive service from December 2003 to January 2004. He is a brand ambassador for Head & Shoulders, and appeared in advertising campaigns for the company. Other companies that Button has done business with are Hilton, Hugo Boss, Santander Bank, Tag Heuer, Vodafone, Baylis & Harding, Mobil 1, and Hackett London. As a result of Button's endorsement money and Mercedes salary, he was listed as one of the world's top-earning drivers in motorsports by Forbes between June 2012 and June 2013. He and multi-sport brand Dare 2b collaborated on a men's ski range of clothing and accessories called AW20 in 2020. Button worked with car builder Ant Anstead, designer Mark Stubbs and business adviser Roger Behle to relaunch luxury coach maker Radford in early 2021. That same year, he co-founded the Coachbilt Whiskey premium blended scotch whisky brand with whisky consultant George Koutsakis.

Button is also involved in charitable work through the creation of The Jenson Button Trust. Established in March 2010, the Trust selects and nominates a number of charitable beneficiaries that receive funding. He is a patron of Make-A-Wish Foundation UK granting the wishes of terminally ill children and young persons, a sport ambassador for both The Prince's Trust and the Princess Charlene of Monaco Foundation, and supports the Sean Edwards Foundation. Button is part of Johnnie Walker's Join The Pact initiative to promote responsible drinking, and began the Pink for Papa campaign in 2014 following the death of his father to raise funding for the Henry Surtees Foundation.

Button ran a restaurant, Victus, in Harrogate from 2011 to 2012. In 2012, he, Goodard and public relations officer James Williamson founded sports agency The Sports Partnership to provide public relations services and management to the sporting industry. Button, Buncombe and team principal Bob Neville founded sports car team Jenson Team Rocket RJN in late 2018. He was on the judging panel of the 2003 UK F1 Drivers' Challenge broadcast on the Five television programme Be A Grand Prix Driver, voiced his own character in the animated cartoon series Tooned, and since the 2018 British Grand Prix, has analysed select races for Sky Sports F1. (Note: Button commentated for ITV at the 2005 Monaco Grand Prix while BAR were serving their ban.)

In 2026, Button launched a campaign to find the next generation of young F1 drivers and identify the youngest team principal, through their interest in racecar simulation and/or a love of competing in karting.

== Public image ==
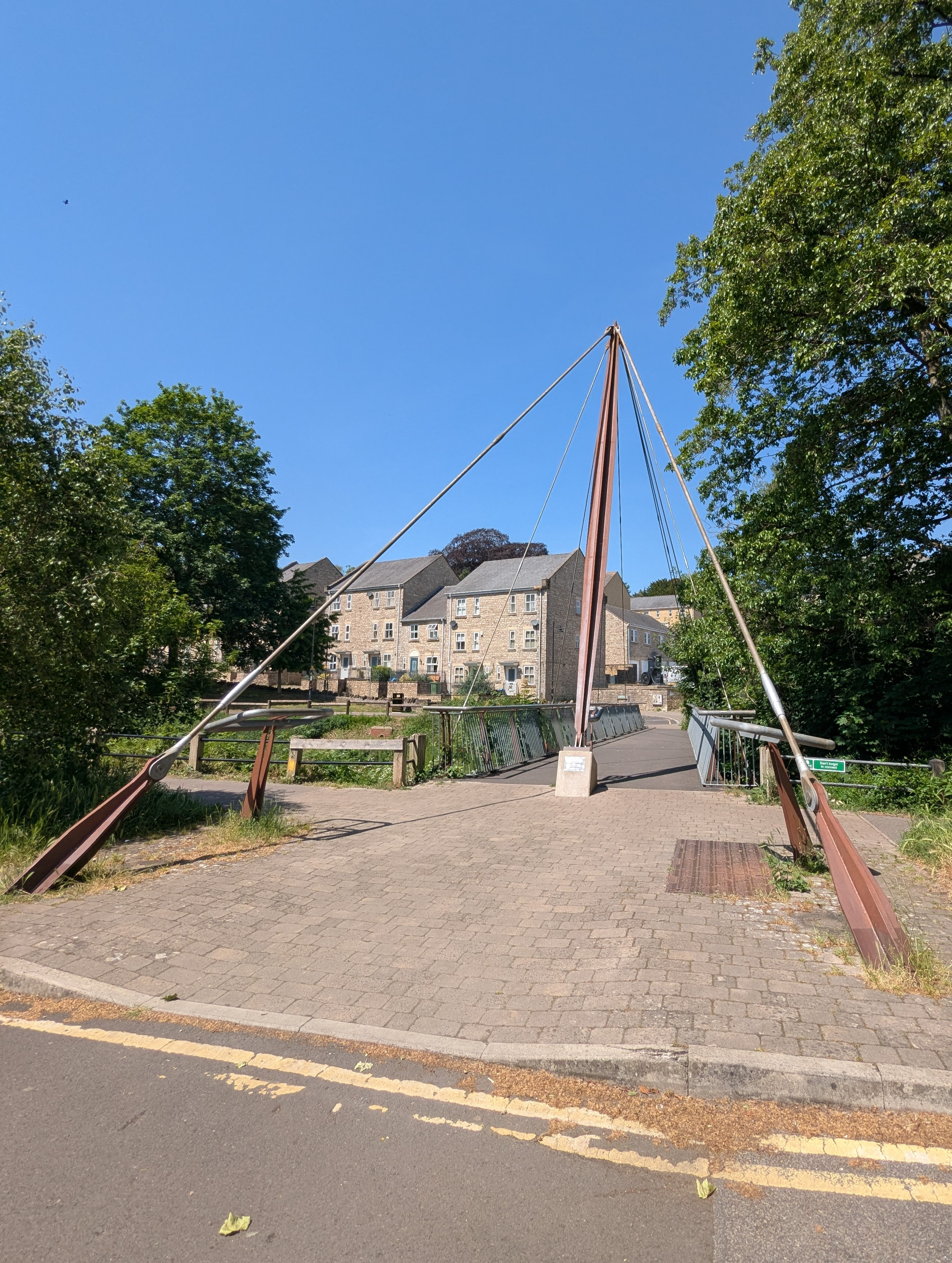
The Jenson Button Bridge in his home town of Frome was erected in 2011 to celebrate his 2009 Formula One World Championship

Button has received a varying amount of press coverage from minor to extensive on his F1 career and personal life; this effect has been labelled "Buttonmania". Prior to winning the 2009 championship, his lack of success led critics to label him "a nearly man" and "a pin-up and lightweight" for his photogenic appearance, but it ceased following his success. Ben Anderson of Autosport notes that the driver "is rarely picked as one of grand prix racing's true elite drivers" and is not "discussed in the same breath as those, such as Schumacher and Ayrton Senna" due to "a lack of absolute dynamism behind the wheel in difficult technical circumstances – perhaps holds him back from being regarded as among the true elite." Writing for The New York Times, Brad Spurgeon said that Button's F1 debut began a trend of teams signing young drivers and how they would cope with pressure, performance and the media in the championship. BBC Sport's Andrew Benson called him "urbane and eloquent. Good-looking and charismatic, he is a marketing person's dream, and has a ready wit that can edge into sarcasm if he is impatient or uncomfortable with a situation."

Button finished second to footballer Ryan Giggs in voting for the 2009 BBC Sports Personality of the Year Award. (Note: He was nominated for the BBC Sports Personality of the Year Award three years earlier.) He also won the BBC West Country's Sports Personality of the Year and the Laureus World Breakthrough of the Year award. He won the 2000 BBC Sports Personality of the Year Newcomer Award for finishing eighth in that year's F1 season, the Lorenzo Bandini Trophy in 2001, and the Hawthorn Memorial Trophy as the most successful British or Commonwealth driver in a season five times: from 2004 to 2006, 2009 and 2011. Button was voted the Autosport Rookie of the Year in 2000, the International Racing Driver Award in 2004 and 2009, and the British Competition Driver of the Year in 2003, 2009, 2011 and 2012. He won the BRDC Gold Star in 2004 and 2009, and was inducted into the FIA Hall of Fame in 2017.

Button was appointed Member of the Order of the British Empire (MBE) in the 2010 New Year Honours for services to motorsport. Button's home town, Frome, has named a street and a footbridge over the River Frome after him, and has awarded him the freedom of the town. Button received an honorary doctorate in engineering from the University of Bath in December 2016. He has authored five books about his life and career. (Note: These include: My Life on The Formula One Rollercoaster (ghostwritten by the journalist David Tremayne in 2002); My World (2007); My Championship Year (2009); Life to The Limit (2017); How to be an F1 Driver (2019))

Button's 2009 championship winning season and Brawn GP's rise to success is the focus of the 2023 Disney+ miniseries Brawn: The Impossible Formula 1 Story.

== Personal life ==
Button's hobbies include mountain biking, competing in triathlons and bodyboarding. He also maintains an automobile collection. He was engaged to the English actress and singer Louise Griffiths before ending their five-year relationship in 2005. Button was married to his long-time Japanese girlfriend and model Jessica Michibata from 2014 to 2015. He married American model Brittny Ward in 2022 with whom he has a son and a daughter. They currently reside in Los Angeles. Button supports Bristol City Football Club.

On 3 August 2015, Button and his then wife Jessica were burgled at a rented Saint-Tropez home while staying with friends when robbers looted the house and stole belongings worth £300,000, including his wife's £250,000 engagement ring. Reports suggested that the couple might have been gassed through the air-conditioning system prior to the burglars' entry into the building.

== Karting record ==
=== Karting career summary ===
| Season | Series | Team | Position |
|---|---|---|---|
| 1991 | Super 1 National Championship — IAME Cadet | Wright Karts | 1st |
| 1992 | ABkC ‘O’ Plate — Junior TKM | | 1st |
| 1994 | Andrea Margutti Trophy — 100cc Junior | | 16th |
| 1994 | Torneo delle Industrie — 100cc Junior | | 8th |
| 1995 | Andrea Margutti Trophy — ICA | | 5th |
| 1995 | World Championship — Senior | | 2nd |
| 1996 | Andrea Margutti Trophy — Formula A | | 32nd |
| 1996 | World Cup — Formula A | | 3rd |
| 1996 | World Championship — Senior | | 32nd |
| 1996 | WKA North American Championship — Formula A | | 3rd |
| 1997 | Andrea Margutti Trophy — Formula A | | 10th |
| 1997 | European Championship – Formula Super A | | 1st |
| 1997 | World Cup — Formula Super A | | 27th |
| 1997 | World Championship — Formula Super A | | 27th |

== Racing record ==
=== Career summary ===
| Season | Series | Team | Races | Wins | Poles | F/Laps | Podiums | Points | Position |
|---|---|---|---|---|---|---|---|---|---|
| 1998 | British Formula Ford Championship | Haywood Racing | 15 | 7 | 9 | 7 | 12 | 133 | **1st** |
| 1998 | European Formula Ford Championship | Haywood Racing | 4 | 1 | 2 | 2 | 2 | 47 | **2nd** |
| 1998 | Formula Ford Festival | Haywood Racing | 1 | 1 | 0 | 0 | 1 | N/A | **1st** |
| 1999 | British Formula 3 Championship | Promatecme UK | 16 | 3 | 3 | 4 | 7 | 168 | **3rd** |
| 1999 | Masters of Formula 3 | Promatecme UK | 1 | 0 | 0 | 0 | 0 | N/A | 5th |
| 1999 | Macau Grand Prix | Promatecme UK | 1 | 0 | 0 | 0 | 1 | N/A | **2nd** |
| 1999 | Korea Super Prix | Promatecme UK | 1 | 0 | 0 | 0 | 1 | N/A | **2nd** |
| 1999 | Spa 24 Hours | BMW FINA Team Rafanelli | 1 | 0 | 0 | 0 | 0 | 0 | NC |
| 2000 | Formula One | BMW WilliamsF1 Team | 17 | 0 | 0 | 0 | 0 | 12 | 8th |
| 2001 | Formula One | Mild Seven Benetton Renault | 17 | 0 | 0 | 0 | 0 | 2 | 17th |
| 2002 | Formula One | Mild Seven Renault F1 Team | 17 | 0 | 0 | 0 | 0 | 14 | 7th |
| 2003 | Formula One | Lucky Strike BAR Honda | 15 | 0 | 0 | 0 | 0 | 17 | 9th |
| 2004 | Formula One | Lucky Strike BAR Honda | 18 | 0 | 1 | 0 | 10 | 85 | **3rd** |
| 2005 | Formula One | Lucky Strike BAR Honda | 16 | 0 | 1 | 0 | 2 | 37 | 9th |
| 2006 | Formula One | Lucky Strike Honda Racing F1 Team | 18 | 1 | 1 | 0 | 3 | 56 | 6th |
| 2007 | Formula One | Honda Racing F1 Team | 17 | 0 | 0 | 0 | 0 | 6 | 15th |
| 2008 | Formula One | Honda Racing F1 Team | 18 | 0 | 0 | 0 | 0 | 3 | 18th |
| 2009 | Formula One | Brawn GP F1 Team | 17 | 6 | 4 | 2 | 9 | 95 | **1st** |
| 2010 | Formula One | Vodafone McLaren Mercedes | 19 | 2 | 0 | 1 | 7 | 214 | 5th |
| 2011 | Formula One | Vodafone McLaren Mercedes | 19 | 3 | 0 | 3 | 12 | 270 | **2nd** |
| 2012 | Formula One | Vodafone McLaren Mercedes | 20 | 3 | 1 | 2 | 6 | 188 | 5th |
| 2013 | Formula One | Vodafone McLaren Mercedes | 19 | 0 | 0 | 0 | 0 | 73 | 9th |
| 2014 | Formula One | McLaren Mercedes | 19 | 0 | 0 | 0 | 1 | 126 | 8th |
| 2015 | Formula One | McLaren Honda | 19 | 0 | 0 | 0 | 0 | 16 | 16th |
| 2016 | Formula One | McLaren Honda | 21 | 0 | 0 | 0 | 0 | 21 | 15th |
| 2017 | Formula One | McLaren Honda | 1 | 0 | 0 | 0 | 0 | 0 | NC |
| 2017 | Super GT - GT500 | Team Mugen | 1 | 0 | 0 | 0 | 0 | 0 | NC |
| 2018 | Super GT - GT500 | Team Kunimitsu | 8 | 1 | 1 | 0 | 4 | 78 | **1st** |
| 2018 | 24 Hours of Le Mans - LMP1 | SMP Racing | 1 | 0 | 0 | 0 | 0 | N/A | DNF |
| 2018–19 | FIA World Endurance Championship - LMP1 | SMP Racing | 4 | 0 | 0 | 0 | 1 | 27 | 15th |
| 2019 | Super GT - GT500 | Team Kunimitsu | 8 | 0 | 0 | 0 | 2 | 37 | 8th |
| 2019 | Deutsche Tourenwagen Masters | Team Kunimitsu | 2 | 0 | 0 | 0 | 0 | 0 | NC† |
| 2020 | British GT Championship - GT3 | Jenson Team Rocket RJN | 1 | 0 | 0 | 0 | 0 | 0 | NC† |
| 2021 | Extreme E | JBXE | 1 | 0 | 0 | 0 | 0 | 17 | 12th |
| 2022–23 | Nitro Rallycross Championship | Xite Energy Racing | 1 | 0 | 0 | 0 | 0 | 21 | 17th |
| 2023 | NASCAR Cup Series | Rick Ware Racing | 3 | 0 | 0 | 0 | 0 | 45 | 35th |
| 2023 | IMSA SportsCar Championship - GTP | JDC-Miller MotorSports | 1 | 0 | 0 | 0 | 0 | 282 | 23rd |
| 2023 | 24 Hours of Le Mans | Hendrick Motorsports | 1 | 0 | 0 | 0 | 0 | N/A | 39th |
| 2024 | FIA World Endurance Championship - Hypercar | Hertz Team Jota | 8 | 0 | 0 | 0 | 0 | 28 | 19th |
| 2024 | 24 Hours of Le Mans | Hertz Team Jota | 1 | 0 | 0 | 0 | 0 | N/A | 9th |
| 2024 | IMSA SportsCar Championship - GTP | Wayne Taylor Racing with Andretti | 1 | 0 | 0 | 0 | 1 | 326 | 25th |
| 2025 | FIA World Endurance Championship – Hypercar | Cadillac Hertz Team Jota | 8 | 0 | 0 | 0 | 1 | 46 | 10th |

^{†} As Button was a guest driver, he was ineligible to score championship points.

=== Complete British Formula 3 Championship results ===
(key) (Races in bold indicate pole position) (Races in italics indicate fastest lap)

| Year | Entrant | Engine | Class | 1 | 2 | 3 | 4 | 5 | 6 | 7 | 8 | 9 | 10 | 11 | 12 | 13 | 14 | 15 | 16 | DC | Pts |
|---|---|---|---|---|---|---|---|---|---|---|---|---|---|---|---|---|---|---|---|---|---|
| 1999 | Promatecme UK | Renault Sodemo | A | **DON**; 2 | SIL; 6 | THR; 1 | BRH; 8 | BRH; 7 | OUL; 5 | CRO; Ret | BRH; 6 | SIL; 2 | SNE; 11 | PEM; 2 | **PEM**; 1 | DON; 2 | **SPA**; 4 | SIL; 1 | THR; Ret | 3rd | 168 |

=== Complete Spa 24 Hours results ===
| Year | Team | Co-Drivers | Car | Class | Laps | Pos. | Class Pos. |
|---|---|---|---|---|---|---|---|
| 1999 | (Belgium) BMW FINA Team Rafanelli | (Belgium) David Saelens (Czech Republic) Tomáš Enge | BMW 320i E46; BMW / Rafanelli | SP | 22 | DNF | DNF |

=== Complete Formula One results ===
(key) (Races in bold indicate pole position; races in italics indicate fastest lap; small number denotes the finishing position)

| Year | Entrant | Chassis | Engine | 1 | 2 | 3 | 4 | 5 | 6 | 7 | 8 | 9 | 10 | 11 | 12 | 13 | 14 | 15 | 16 | 17 | 18 | 19 | 20 | 21 | WDC | Points |
|---|---|---|---|---|---|---|---|---|---|---|---|---|---|---|---|---|---|---|---|---|---|---|---|---|---|---|
| 2000 | BMW Williams F1 Team | Williams FW22 | BMW E41 3.0 V10 | AUS; Ret | BRA; 6 | SMR; Ret | GBR; 5 | ESP; 17^{†} | EUR; 10^{†} | MON; Ret | CAN; 11 | FRA; 8 | AUT; 5 | GER; 4 | HUN; 9 | BEL; 5 | ITA; Ret | USA; Ret | JPN; 5 | MAL; Ret | | | | | 8th | 12 |
| 2001 | Mild Seven Benetton Renault | Benetton B201 | Renault RS21 3.0 V10 | AUS; 14^{†} | MAL; 11 | BRA; 10 | SMR; 12 | ESP; 15 | AUT; Ret | MON; 7 | CAN; Ret | EUR; 13 | FRA; 16^{†} | GBR; 15 | GER; 5 | HUN; Ret | BEL; Ret | ITA; Ret | USA; 9 | JPN; 7 | | | | | 17th | 2 |
| 2002 | Mild Seven Renault F1 Team | Renault R202 | Renault RS22 3.0 V10 | AUS; Ret | MAL; 4 | BRA; 4 | SMR; 5 | ESP; 12^{†} | AUT; 7 | MON; Ret | CAN; 15^{†} | EUR; 5 | GBR; 12^{†} | FRA; 6 | GER; Ret | HUN; Ret | BEL; Ret | ITA; 5 | USA; 8 | JPN; 6 | | | | | 7th | 14 |
| 2003 | Lucky Strike BAR Honda | BAR 005 | Honda RA003E 3.0 V10 | AUS; 10 | MAL; 7 | BRA; Ret | SMR; 8 | ESP; 9 | AUT; 4 | MON; DNS | CAN; Ret | EUR; 7 | FRA; Ret | GBR; 8 | GER; 8 | HUN; 10 | ITA; Ret | USA; Ret | JPN; 4 | | | | | | 9th | 17 |
| 2004 | Lucky Strike BAR Honda | BAR 006 | Honda RA004E 3.0 V10 | AUS; 6 | MAL; 3 | BHR; 3 | **SMR**; 2 | ESP; 8 | MON; 2 | EUR; 3 | CAN; 3 | USA; Ret | FRA; 5 | GBR; 4 | GER; 2 | HUN; 5 | BEL; Ret | ITA; 3 | CHN; 2 | JPN; 3 | BRA; Ret | | | | **3rd** | **85** |
| 2005 | Lucky Strike BAR Honda | BAR 007 | Honda RA005E 3.0 V10 | AUS; 11^{†} | MAL; Ret | BHR; Ret | SMR; DSQ | ESP | MON | EUR; 10 | **CAN**; Ret | USA; DNS | FRA; 4 | GBR; 5 | GER; 3 | HUN; 5 | TUR; 5 | ITA; 8 | BEL; 3 | BRA; 7 | JPN; 5 | CHN; 8 | | | 9th | 37 |
| 2006 | Lucky Strike Honda Racing F1 Team | Honda RA106 | Honda RA806E 2.4 V8 | BHR; 4 | MAL; 3 | **AUS**; 10^{†} | SMR; 7 | EUR; Ret | ESP; 6 | MON; 11 | GBR; Ret | CAN; 9 | USA; Ret | FRA; Ret | GER; 4 | HUN; 1 | TUR; 4 | ITA; 5 | CHN; 4 | JPN; 4 | BRA; 3 | | | | 6th | 56 |
| 2007 | Honda Racing F1 Team | Honda RA107 | Honda RA807E 2.4 V8 | AUS; 15 | MAL; 12 | BHR; Ret | ESP; 12 | MON; 11 | CAN; Ret | USA; 12 | FRA; 8 | GBR; 10 | EUR; Ret | HUN; Ret | TUR; 13 | ITA; 8 | BEL; Ret | JPN; 11^{†} | CHN; 5 | BRA; Ret | | | | | 15th | 6 |
| 2008 | Honda Racing F1 Team | Honda RA108 | Honda RA808E 2.4 V8 | AUS; Ret | MAL; 10 | BHR; Ret | ESP; 6 | TUR; 11 | MON; 11 | CAN; 11 | FRA; Ret | GBR; Ret | GER; 17 | HUN; 12 | EUR; 13 | BEL; 15 | ITA; 15 | SIN; 9 | JPN; 14 | CHN; 16 | BRA; 13 | | | | 18th | 3 |
| 2009 | Brawn GP F1 Team | Brawn BGP 001 | Mercedes FO 108W 2.4 V8 | **AUS**; 1 | **MAL**; 1‡ | CHN; 3 | BHR; 1 | **ESP**; 1 | **MON**; 1 | TUR; 1 | GBR; 6 | GER; 5 | HUN; 7 | EUR; 7 | BEL; Ret | ITA; 2 | SIN; 5 | JPN; 8 | BRA; 5 | ABU; 3 | | | | | **1st** | **95** |
| 2010 | Vodafone McLaren Mercedes | McLaren MP4-25 | Mercedes FO 108X 2.4 V8 | BHR; 7 | AUS; 1 | MAL; 8 | CHN; 1 | ESP; 5 | MON; Ret | TUR; 2 | CAN; 2 | EUR; 3 | GBR; 4 | GER; 5 | HUN; 8 | BEL; Ret | ITA; 2 | SIN; 4 | JPN; 4 | KOR; 12 | BRA; 5 | ABU; 3 | | | 5th | 214 |
| 2011 | Vodafone McLaren Mercedes | McLaren MP4-26 | Mercedes FO 108Y 2.4 V8 | AUS; 6 | MAL; 2 | CHN; 4 | TUR; 6 | ESP; 3 | MON; 3 | CAN; 1 | EUR; 6 | GBR; Ret | GER; Ret | HUN; 1 | BEL; 3 | ITA; 2 | SIN; 2 | JPN; 1 | KOR; 4 | IND; 2 | ABU; 3 | BRA; 3 | | | **2nd** | **270** |
| 2012 | Vodafone McLaren Mercedes | McLaren MP4-27 | Mercedes FO 108Z 2.4 V8 | AUS; 1 | MAL; 14 | CHN; 2 | BHR; 18^{†} | ESP; 9 | MON; 16^{†} | CAN; 16 | EUR; 8 | GBR; 10 | GER; 2 | HUN; 6 | **BEL**; 1 | ITA; Ret | SIN; 2 | JPN; 4 | KOR; Ret | IND; 5 | ABU; 4 | USA; 5 | BRA; 1 | | 5th | 188 |
| 2013 | Vodafone McLaren Mercedes | McLaren MP4-28 | Mercedes FO 108F 2.4 V8 | AUS; 9 | MAL; 17^{†} | CHN; 5 | BHR; 10 | ESP; 8 | MON; 6 | CAN; 12 | GBR; 13 | GER; 6 | HUN; 7 | BEL; 6 | ITA; 10 | SIN; 7 | KOR; 8 | JPN; 9 | IND; 14 | ABU; 12 | USA; 10 | BRA; 4 | | | 9th | 73 |
| 2014 | McLaren Mercedes | McLaren MP4-29 | Mercedes PU106A Hybrid 1.6 V6 t | AUS; 3 | MAL; 6 | BHR; 17^{†} | CHN; 11 | ESP; 11 | MON; 6 | CAN; 4 | AUT; 11 | GBR; 4 | GER; 8 | HUN; 10 | BEL; 6 | ITA; 8 | SIN; Ret | JPN; 5 | RUS; 4 | USA; 12 | BRA; 4 | ABU; 5 | | | 8th | 126 |
| 2015 | McLaren Honda | McLaren MP4-30 | Honda RA615H 1.6 V6 t | AUS; 11 | MAL; Ret | CHN; 14 | BHR; DNS | ESP; 16 | MON; 8 | CAN; Ret | AUT; Ret | GBR; Ret | HUN; 9 | BEL; 14 | ITA; 14 | SIN; Ret | JPN; 16 | RUS; 9 | USA; 6 | MEX; 14 | BRA; 14 | ABU; 12 | | | 16th | 16 |
| 2016 | McLaren Honda | McLaren MP4-31 | Honda RA616H 1.6 V6 t | AUS; 14 | BHR; Ret | CHN; 13 | RUS; 10 | ESP; 9 | MON; 9 | CAN; Ret | EUR; 11 | AUT; 6 | GBR; 12 | HUN; Ret | GER; 8 | BEL; Ret | ITA; 12 | SIN; Ret | MAL; 9 | JPN; 18 | USA; 9 | MEX; 12 | BRA; 16 | ABU; Ret | 15th | 21 |
| 2017 | McLaren Honda | McLaren MCL32 | Honda RA617H 1.6 V6 t | AUS | CHN | BHR | RUS | ESP | MON; Ret | CAN | AZE | AUT | GBR | HUN | BEL | ITA | SIN | MAL | JPN | USA | MEX | BRA | ABU | | NC | 0 |

^{‡} Half points awarded as less than 75% of race distance was completed.
^{†} Button did not finish the Grand Prix, but was classified as he completed over 90% of the race distance.

=== Complete Super GT results ===
(key) (Races in bold indicate pole position; races in italics indicate fastest lap; small number denotes the finishing position)

| Year | Team | Car | Class | 1 | 2 | 3 | 4 | 5 | 6 | 7 | 8 | DC | Points |
|---|---|---|---|---|---|---|---|---|---|---|---|---|---|
| 2017 | Team Mugen | Honda NSX-GT | GT500 | OKA | FUJ | AUT | SUG | FUJ | SUZ; 12 | CHA | MOT | NC | 0 |
| 2018 | Team Kunimitsu | Honda NSX-GT | GT500 | OKA; 2 | FUJ; 9 | SUZ; 2 | CHA; 11 | FUJ; 5 | **SUG**; 1 | AUT; 5 | MOT; 3 | 1st | 78 |
| 2019 | Team Kunimitsu | Honda NSX-GT | GT500 | OKA; 15 | FUJ; 3 | SUZ; 13 | CHA; 12 | FUJ; 2 | AUT; Ret | SUG; 8 | MOT; 6 | 8th | 37 |

=== 24 Hours of Le Mans results ===
| Year | Team | Co-Drivers | Car | Class | Laps | Pos. | Class Pos. |
|---|---|---|---|---|---|---|---|
| 2018 | (Russia) SMP Racing | (Russia) Mikhail Aleshin (Russia) Vitaly Petrov | BR Engineering BR1-AER | LMP1 | 315 | DNF | DNF |
| 2023 | (United States) Hendrick Motorsports | (United States) Jimmie Johnson (Germany) Mike Rockenfeller | Chevrolet Camaro ZL1 | Innovative | 285 | 39th | – |
| 2024 | (United Kingdom) Hertz Team Jota | (United Kingdom) Phil Hanson (Denmark) Oliver Rasmussen | Porsche 963 | Hypercar | 311 | 9th | 9th |
| 2025 | (United States) Cadillac Hertz Team Jota | (New Zealand) Earl Bamber (France) Sébastien Bourdais | Cadillac V-Series.R | Hypercar | 386 | 7th | 7th |

=== Complete FIA World Endurance Championship results ===
(key) (Races in bold indicate pole position; races in italics indicate fastest lap; small number denotes the finishing position)

| Year | Entrant | Class | Car | Engine | 1 | 2 | 3 | 4 | 5 | 6 | 7 | 8 | Rank | Points |
|---|---|---|---|---|---|---|---|---|---|---|---|---|---|---|
| 2018–19 | SMP Racing | LMP1 | BR Engineering BR1 | AER P60B 2.4 L Turbo V6 | SPA | LMS; Ret | SIL; Ret | FUJ; 4 | SHA; 3 | SEB | SPA | LMS | 15th | 27 |
| 2024 | Hertz Team Jota | Hypercar | Porsche 963 | Porsche 9RD 4.6 L Turbo V8 | QAT; NC | IMO; 11 | SPA; Ret | LMS; 9 | SÃO; 7 | COA; 10 | FUJ; 6 | BHR; 7 | 19th | 28 |
| 2025 | Cadillac Hertz Team Jota | Hypercar | Cadillac V-Series.R | Cadillac LMC55R 5.5 L V8 | QAT; 16 | IMO; 16 | SPA; 6 | LMS; 7 | SÃO; 2 | COA; 6 | FUJ; 13 | BHR; 16 | 10th | 46 |

=== Complete Deutsche Tourenwagen Masters results ===
| Year | Team | Car | 1 | 2 | 3 | 4 | 5 | 6 | 7 | 8 | 9 | 10 | 11 | 12 | 13 | 14 | 15 | 16 | 17 | 18 | Pos | Points |
|---|---|---|---|---|---|---|---|---|---|---|---|---|---|---|---|---|---|---|---|---|---|---|
| 2019 | Team Kunimitsu | Honda NSX-GT | HOC; 1 | HOC; 2 | ZOL; 1 | ZOL; 2 | MIS; 1 | MIS; 2 | NOR; 1 | NOR; 2 | ASS; 1 | ASS; 2 | BRH; 1 | BRH; 2 | LAU; 1 | LAU; 2 | NÜR; 1 | NÜR; 2 | HOC; 1; 9 | HOC; 2; 16 | NC† | 0† |

^{†} As Button was a guest driver, he was ineligible to score championship points.

=== Complete British GT Championship results ===
(key) (Races in bold indicate pole position) (Races in italics indicate fastest lap)

| Year | Team | Car | Class | 1 | 2 | 3 | 4 | 5 | 6 | 7 | 8 | 9 | Pos | Points |
|---|---|---|---|---|---|---|---|---|---|---|---|---|---|---|
| 2020 | Jenson Team Rocket RJN | McLaren 720S GT3 | GT3 | OUL; 1 | OUL; 2 | DON; 1 | DON; 2 | BRH; 1 | DON; 1 | SNE; 1 | SNE; 2 | SIL; 1; 14 | NC† | 0† |

† Not eligible for points.

=== Complete Extreme E results ===
(key)

| Year | Team | Car | 1 | 2 | 3 | 4 | 5 | 6 | 7 | 8 | 9 | 10 | Pos. | Points |
|---|---|---|---|---|---|---|---|---|---|---|---|---|---|---|
| 2021 | JBXE | Spark ODYSSEY 21 | DES; Q 6 | DES; R 6 | OCE; Q | OCE; R | ARC; Q | ARC; R | ISL; Q | ISL; R | JUR; Q | JUR; R | 12th | 17 |

=== NASCAR ===
(key) (Bold – Pole position awarded by qualifying time. Italics – Pole position earned by points standings or practice time. * – Most laps led.)

==== Cup Series ====
NASCAR Cup Series results
| Year | Team | No. | Make | 1 | 2 | 3 | 4 | 5 | 6 | 7 | 8 | 9 | 10 | 11 | 12 | 13 | 14 | 15 | 16 | 17 | 18 | 19 | 20 | 21 | 22 | 23 | 24 | 25 | 26 | 27 | 28 | 29 | 30 | 31 | 32 | 33 | 34 | 35 | 36 | NCSC | Pts | Ref |
|---|---|---|---|---|---|---|---|---|---|---|---|---|---|---|---|---|---|---|---|---|---|---|---|---|---|---|---|---|---|---|---|---|---|---|---|---|---|---|---|---|---|---|
| 2023 | Rick Ware Racing | 15 | Ford | DAY | CAL | LVS | PHO | ATL | COA; 18 | RCH | BRD | MAR | TAL | DOV | KAN | DAR | CLT | GTW | SON | NSH | CSC; 21 | ATL | NHA | POC | RCH | MCH | IRC; 28 | GLN | DAY | DAR | KAN | BRI | TEX | TAL | ROV | LVS | HOM | MAR | PHO | 35th | 45 | |

=== Complete IMSA SportsCar Championship results ===
| Year | Entrant | No. | Class | Chassis | Engine | 1 | 2 | 3 | 4 | 5 | 6 | 7 | 8 | 9 | Rank | Points |
|---|---|---|---|---|---|---|---|---|---|---|---|---|---|---|---|---|
| 2023 | JDC-Miller MotorSports | 5 | GTP | Porsche 963 | Porsche 9RD 4.6 L V8 | DAY | SEB | LBH | LGA | WGL | MOS | ELK | IMS | PET; 5 | 23rd | 282 |
| 2024 | Wayne Taylor Racing with Andretti Autosport | 40 | GTP | Acura ARX-06 | Acura AR24e 2.4 L Turbo V6 | DAY; 3 | SEB | LBH | LGA | DET | WGL | ELK | IMS | PET | 25th | 326 |

== Bibliography ==
- Button, Jenson; Tremayne, David (2002). Jenson Button: My Life on the Formula One Rollercoaster. Bungay, Suffolk: Bantam Press. ISBN 978-0-593-04875-7 – via Open Library.
- Domenjoz, Luc, ed. (2003). Formula 1 Yearbook 2003–04. Bath, England: Parragon. ISBN 1-40542-089-8 – via Open Library.
- Henry, Alan (2005). Driven Man: David Richards, Prodrive, and the Race to Win. Saint Paul, Minnesota: Motorbooks International. ISBN 0-7603-2175-2 – via Open Library.
- Hill, Tim (2005). British Grand Prix heroes. Dubai, United Arab Emirates: Atlantic Publishing. ISBN 1-84461-337-2 – via Open Library.
- Raby, Philip (2007). Grand Prix Driver by Driver. Swindon, Wiltshire: Green Umbrella Publishing. ISBN 978-1-905828-17-3 – via Open Library.
- Henry, Alan (2009). Jenson Button: A World Champion's Story. Sparkford, England: Haynes Publishing. ISBN 978-1-84425-936-6 – via Open Library.
- Button, Jenson (2010). A Championship Year (UK ed.). London, England: Orion Publishing. ISBN 978-1-4091-1827-5 – via Open Library.
- Couldwell, Clive (2010). "Jenson Button (1980–)". Formula One: Made In Britain. London, England: Virgin Books. ISBN 978-0-7535-3951-4.
- Jones, Bruce (2010). "Part 1: The Story of Formula One: The 2000s". The Complete Encyclopedia of Formula One (12th ed.). London, England: Carlton Books. ISBN 978-1-84732-304-0 – via Open Library.
- Jones, Bruce (2011). "Review of the 2010 Season". Grand Prix 2011: The Official ITV Sport Guide. London, England: Carlton Books. ISBN 978-1-84442-088-9 – via Open Library.
- May, Reg (November 2013). Racing With Heroes. Dorchester, England: Veloce Publishing. ISBN 978-1-84584-654-1 – via Google Books.
- Chicane (2015). "Jenson Button". The Fastest Show on Earth: The Mammoth Book of Formula 1. London, England: Little, Brown Book Group. ISBN 978-0-7624-5622-2 – via Open Library.
- Button, Jenson (2017). Life to the Limit. London, England: Blink Publishing. ISBN 978-1-911600-34-3 – via Open Library.
- Button, Jenson (2019). How To Be An F1 Driver: My Guide To Life In The Fast Lane. London, England: Blink Publishing. ISBN 978-1-78870-261-4.
- Hamilton, Maurice (2020). Formula One: The Champions: 70 years of legendary F1 drivers. London, England: White Lion Publishing. ISBN 978-1-78131-946-8 – via Google Books.

== Notes ==
Sporting positions
| Preceded by Jacky van der Ende | British Formula Ford Champion; 1998 | Succeeded by Nicolas Kiesa |
| Preceded by Jacky van der Ende | Formula Ford Festival Winner; 1998 | Succeeded by Ricardo van der Ende |
| Preceded by Lewis Hamilton | Formula One World Champion; 2009 | Succeeded by Sebastian Vettel |
| Preceded by Ryo Hirakawa; Nick Cassidy | Super GT; GT500 Champion; 2018; With: Naoki Yamamoto | Succeeded by Kazuya Oshima; Kenta Yamashita |
Awards
| Preceded by Andrew Kirkaldy | McLaren Autosport BRDC Award; 1998 | Succeeded by Gary Paffett |
| Preceded by New Award | Autosport Rookie of the Year; 2000 | Succeeded by Juan Pablo Montoya |
| Preceded by Jarno Trulli | Lorenzo Bandini Trophy; 2001 | Succeeded by Juan Pablo Montoya |
| Preceded by David Coulthard | British Competition Driver of the Year; 2003 | Succeeded by Andy Priaulx |
| Preceded by David Coulthard | Hawthorn Memorial Trophy; 2004, 2005, 2006 | Succeeded by Lewis Hamilton |
| Preceded by Juan Pablo Montoya | International Driver of the Year; 2004 | Succeeded by Kimi Räikkönen |
| Preceded by Dan Wheldon | British Competition Driver of the Year; 2006 | Succeeded by Lewis Hamilton |
| Preceded by Lewis Hamilton | International Driver of the Year; 2009 | Succeeded by Sebastian Vettel |
| Preceded by Allan McNish | British Competition Driver of the Year; 2009 | Succeeded by Dario Franchitti |
| Preceded by Lewis Hamilton | Hawthorn Memorial Trophy; 2009 | Succeeded by Mark Webber |
| Preceded by Rebecca Adlington | Laureus World Breakthrough of the Year; 2010 | Succeeded by Martin Kaymer |
| Preceded by Mark Webber | Hawthorn Memorial Trophy; 2011 | Succeeded by Lewis Hamilton |
| Preceded by Dario Franchitti | British Competition Driver of the Year; 2011, 2012 | Succeeded by Lewis Hamilton |
Records
| Preceded by Ricardo Rodríguez; 20 years, 123 days (1962 Belgian GP) | Youngest Driver to Score; Points in Formula One; 20 years, 67 days (2000 Brazilian Grand Prix) | Succeeded by Sebastian Vettel; 19 years, 349 days (2007 United States GP) |
