= 2007 French Grand Prix =

Formula One motor race held in 2007

Coordinates: 46°51′51″N 3°09′49″E

Race 8 of 17 in the 2007 Formula One World Championship
← Previous race	Next race →

Race details
- Date: 1 July 2007
- Official name: Formula 1 Grand Prix de France 2007
- Location: Circuit de Nevers Magny-Cours, Magny-Cours, France
- Course: Permanent racing facility
- Course length: 4.411 km (2.741 miles)
- Distance: 70 laps, 308.586 km (191.746 miles)
- Weather: Cloudy

Pole position
Driver	(Brazil) Felipe Massa	Ferrari
- Time: 1:15.034

Fastest lap
Driver	(Brazil) Felipe Massa	Ferrari
- Time: 1:16.099 on lap 42

Podium
First	(Finland) Kimi Räikkönen	Ferrari
Second	(Brazil) Felipe Massa	Ferrari
Third	(United Kingdom) Lewis Hamilton	McLaren-Mercedes

The 2007 French Grand Prix (formally the Formula 1 Grand Prix de France 2007) was a Formula One motor race held on 1 July 2007 at the Circuit de Nevers Magny-Cours, Magny-Cours, France. It was the eighth race of the 2007 FIA Formula One World Championship.

Kimi Räikkönen for the Ferrari team won the 70-lap race starting from third position. Felipe Massa, who started the race from pole position, finished second in the latter Ferrari, with Lewis Hamilton third in a McLaren car. It was Ferrari's first one-two finish since the 2006 German Grand Prix.

Massa controlled most of the race from the front, but Räikkönen overtook him during the second round of pit stops to take the lead.

== Report ==
=== Background ===
Following the United States Grand Prix, the Formula One teams headed to Silverstone for a three-day test. Nine teams participated, with the exception of Honda and Super Aguri, who opted to test at the Jerez circuit. Neither Ferrari nor McLaren were fastest on the first two days at Silverstone, rather it was Toyota that was fastest on both of the days. However, on the third and final day of testing Felipe Massa put Ferrari on top with a time of 1:20.805. The nearest challenger, Nico Rosberg was 0.469 behind, with Fernando Alonso a further 0.010 behind. With Ferrari fastest on the third day, both of their drivers, Massa and Kimi Räikkönen were very confident heading into the French round of the season.

Off track Ferrari launched a criminal investigation in Modena against their own employee Nigel Stepney. Stepney's lawyer ruled out sabotage claims, and Stepney said it was part of a "dirty tricks" campaign.

There was also controversy at the rear-end of the grid, as Spyker asked the Fédération Internationale de l'Automobile (FIA) to look at the new updates that were put on the Super Aguri at Indianapolis to see whether the Aguri team are receiving current Honda parts. On Saturday, Super Aguri's managing director Daniel Audetto said "We have rules – they [Spyker] can just protest. Tell them to protest – if I have something to complain about, I will make a protest."

Robert Kubica was back in his BMW after his crash at the Canadian Grand Prix. Early on Saturday, Nick Heidfeld was cleared to continue in his BMW after experiencing back pains during Friday practice.

Changes were made to the track for this year: artificial turf was installed along the kerbs and the edges of the final chicane to prevent drivers from cutting the corner and running wide on the exit.

=== Practice ===
The race was preceded by three practice sessions. Ferrari dominated both practice sessions on the Friday, with Räikkönen fastest in the first Practice Session and Felipe Massa was fastest in the second Practice Session. Behind the Ferraris, Alonso was third in his McLaren, but seven tenths behind, with his teammate and World Championship leader Lewis Hamilton sixth, but lost nearly an hour of the session due to car trouble. The two McLarens were split by David Coulthard and Nico Rosberg.

Hamilton managed to recover from his morning trouble to post the fourth fastest time in the second Practice Session on Friday afternoon. The Ferraris were still leading, but Massa was fastest, just 0.035 seconds ahead of Räikkönen. However, one of the major surprises came from Scuderia Toro Rosso, as Scott Speed posted the third quickest time, with Vitantonio Liuzzi posting the fifth quickest time. During the session, Liuzzi was involved in a bizarre incident with Anthony Davidson; Davidson exited his garage, and smashed his Super Aguri into the side of Liuzzi's Toro Rosso; knocking his front wing off in the accident. Alonso finished the second practice session eighth.

In the final practice session on Saturday morning, Hamilton managed to beat Ferrari, with the Englishman ahead of second-placed Massa by 0.063 seconds. Hamilton and the two Ferraris completed the top three, but Alonso was again down in eighth, having missed nearly the whole of the session with a faulty brake sensor. The Renaults sparked a return to form with Heikki Kovalainen and Giancarlo Fisichella fourth and fifth, both ahead of rivals BMW, who were sixth and fifteenth respectively.

=== Qualifying ===
The qualifying session to determine the starting order for the race was held in three parts, six cars were eliminated after each of the first two parts. Both Spykers and both Super Aguris were knocked out of the first phase of qualifying, along with Alexander Wurz's Williams and Vitantonio Liuzzi's Toro Rosso. For Super Aguri's Takuma Sato, it did not matter where he qualified, as he was docked ten places, due to overtaking Jenson Button under yellow flags at the last Grand Prix. Spyker's Adrian Sutil was hoping for a wet race after an unspectacular qualifying. At the front end of the grid, the McLarens were first and fourth, with Hamilton on top, and the Ferraris splitting them in second and third. Heikki Kovalainen rounded out the top five.

David Coulthard failed to complete a single timed lap in the second part of qualifying due to a gearbox problem, and started sixteenth. Both Hondas were knocked out also, along with Mark Webber, Scott Speed and Ralf Schumacher. Both Button and Rubens Barrichello were happier with the upgraded Honda, with Button saying "the car is certainly better than the last race in Indianapolis, although the positions don't reflect that". Hamilton was again fastest in the second part of qualifying, with teammate Alonso down in fifth. Massa, Räikkönen and Kubica rounded out the top four.

After topping the first two parts of qualifying, Hamilton dropped to second in the third and final part, with Massa taking pole position, just 0.070 seconds ahead of the Englishman. Massa stated in the post-Qualifying press conference that "it looks like we [Ferrari] are back and fighting", with Hamilton believing pole was possible had he not made a mistake at Turn 15. Räikkönen qualified third as he lost time on one corner, which he called "all my fault". Alonso was unable to complete a single lap in the session due to a gearbox problem. He was classified tenth and stated that he'd "prefer a wet race". Behind Räikkönen was Kubica in fourth, but despite qualifying fifth, Giancarlo Fisichella believed there was "potential for more" from the Renault. Fisichella's teammate Kovalainen was sixth, with Nick Heidfeld seventh. Jarno Trulli, Nico Rosberg and Alonso rounded out the top ten. Rosberg also had a slight gearbox problem in the final part of qualifying, which he believed cost him a few tenths coming into the final few corners.

Three people were killed in a helicopter crash at the circuit on Saturday night. They were Emmanuel Longobardi, a PR operative; the pilot Pierre Bennehard; and Simon McGill, a New Zealand national. A Bridgestone employee and his niece were injured. Longobardi was a popular member of the Formula One paddock.

=== Race ===
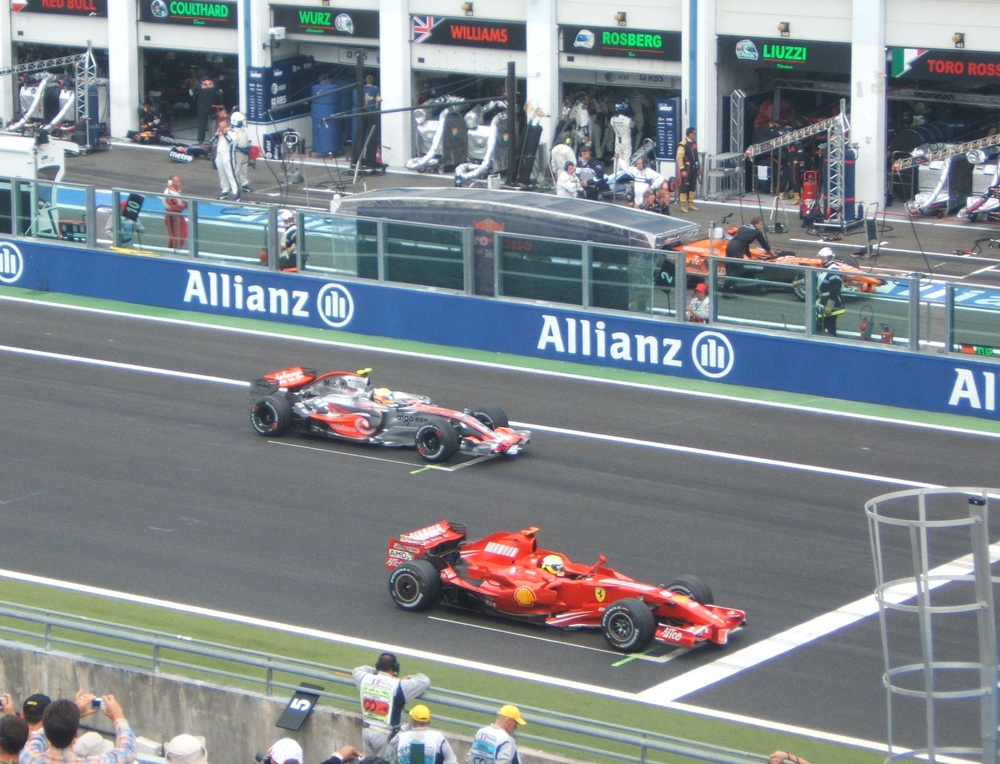
Felipe Massa and Lewis Hamilton line up on the front row of the starting grid

Rain had been forecast for the race, and the track was wet due to a light rain that had fallen in the morning. Sand also had to be spread on the track due to an oil leak during the Porsche Supercup race, in which a one Porsche had left a trail of oil stretching from the Imola chicane all the way to the Lycée corner at the end of the lap.

Adrian Sutil in the Spyker opted to start from the pitlane. Massa got off to the best possible start and retained his lead, but Räikkönen passed Hamilton into turn one. At the back of the field, Anthony Davidson hit the back of Vitantonio Liuzzi's Toro Rosso. The Toro Rosso came back onto the track and smashed into the side of the Super Aguri. Liuzzi said afterwards that "all we can do is wait for Silverstone and hope that the definite improvement we have made with the car pays off". At the Adelaide hairpin, Jarno Trulli rammed into the back of Heikki Kovalainen. Trulli was out, but Kovalainen continued at the back of the field. Trulli apologised to Kovalainen after the race, and declared it "a racing accident". The collision promoted Alonso to eighth.

Robert Kubica was quickly losing ground on the two Ferraris and Hamilton. Alonso passed Rosberg for seventh, and quickly closed in on Heidfeld, but stayed behind him until he made a pit stop on Lap 16. Alonso attempted to get past on Lap five, but ran wide, giving the position back to the German. Hamilton also made a pit stop on Lap 16, with Massa making a pit stop on Lap 19 and Räikkönen on Lap 21.

Räikkönen decreased Massa's lead back down from four seconds to two seconds. Alonso passed both Heidfeld and Fisichella in the middle section of the race. In the second round of stops, Räikkönen made a pit stop two laps after Massa. These two laps extra gave Räikkönen the lead after his second stop, with Massa now second. Alonso made a pit stop for the second time on lap 35. Heidfeld and Fisichella made pit stops several laps later, and both of them got out in front of Alonso. Christijan Albers had an unusual accident, his car left the pit lane with the fuel rig attached without being detached by the pit crews. Eventually, he drove to the side of the track and retired.

Räikkönen won the race from teammate Massa, with Hamilton third. This marked Ferrari's first one-two of the season. Massa stated that the race win was lost "because of traffic", while teammate Räikkönen stated he was "much happier with the car", as he became the first Finn to win the race. Kubica was a lonely fourth, with Fisichella, Heidfeld, Alonso and Button rounding out the points. Despite it being Button's first points of 2007, he said that he was "not getting too excited about it". Despite finishing seventh, Alonso was still confident about his title chances, saying that he hoped the "two points are important at the end of the season".

== Classification ==
=== Qualifying ===
Pos.	No.	Driver	Constructor	Q1	Q2	Q3	Grid
1	5	(Brazil) Felipe Massa	Ferrari	1:15.303	1:14.822	1:15.034	1
2	2	(United Kingdom) Lewis Hamilton	McLaren-Mercedes	1:14.805	1:14.795	1:15.104	2
3	6	(Finland) Kimi Räikkönen	Ferrari	1:14.872	1:14.828	1:15.257	3
4	10	(Poland) Robert Kubica	BMW Sauber	1:15.778	1:15.066	1:15.493	4
5	3	(Italy) Giancarlo Fisichella	Renault	1:16.047	1:15.227	1:15.674	5
6	4	(Finland) Heikki Kovalainen	Renault	1:15.524	1:15.272	1:15.826	6
7	9	(Germany) Nick Heidfeld	BMW Sauber	1:15.783	1:15.149	1:15.900	7
8	12	(Italy) Jarno Trulli	Toyota	1:16.118	1:15.379	1:15.935	8
9	16	(Germany) Nico Rosberg	Williams-Toyota	1:16.092	1:15.331	1:16.328	9
10	1	(Spain) Fernando Alonso	McLaren-Mercedes	1:15.322	1:15.084	No time^{1}	10
11	11	(Germany) Ralf Schumacher	Toyota	1:15.760	1:15.534		11
12	7	(United Kingdom) Jenson Button	Honda	1:16.113	1:15.584		12
13	8	(Brazil) Rubens Barrichello	Honda	1:16.140	1:15.761		13
14	15	(Australia) Mark Webber	Red Bull-Renault	1:15.746	1:15.806		14
15	19	(United States) Scott Speed	Toro Rosso-Ferrari	1:15.980	1:16.049		15
16	14	(United Kingdom) David Coulthard	Red Bull-Renault	1:15.915	No time^{2}		16
17	18	(Italy) Vitantonio Liuzzi	Toro Rosso-Ferrari	1:16.142			17
18	17	(Austria) Alexander Wurz	Williams-Toyota	1:16.241			18
19	22	(Japan) Takuma Sato	Super Aguri-Honda	1:16.244			22^{3}
20	23	(United Kingdom) Anthony Davidson	Super Aguri-Honda	1:16.366			19
21	21	(Netherlands) Christijan Albers	Spyker-Ferrari	1:17.826			20
22	20	(Germany) Adrian Sutil	Spyker-Ferrari	1:17.915			21

Notes

- ^1 – Fernando Alonso did not set a lap time in Q3 because of a gearbox issue.
- ^2 – David Coulthard did not record a time in Q2 due to a gearbox problem.
- ^3 – Takuma Sato was given a drive-through penalty for passing Jenson Button under yellow flags at the United States Grand Prix but retired from the race before he could serve the penalty, so the penalty was changed to a ten-place grid penalty at this event.

=== Race ===
Pos.	No.	Driver	Constructor	Laps	Time/Retired	Grid	Points
1	6	(Finland) Kimi Räikkönen	Ferrari	70	1:30:54.200	3	10
2	5	(Brazil) Felipe Massa	Ferrari	70	+2.414	1	8
3	2	(United Kingdom) Lewis Hamilton	McLaren-Mercedes	70	+32.153	2	6
4	10	(Poland) Robert Kubica	BMW Sauber	70	+41.727	4	5
5	9	(Germany) Nick Heidfeld	BMW Sauber	70	+48.801	7	4
6	3	(Italy) Giancarlo Fisichella	Renault	70	+51.940	5	3
7	1	(Spain) Fernando Alonso	McLaren-Mercedes	70	+56.516	10	2
8	7	(United Kingdom) Jenson Button	Honda	70	+58.885	12	1
9	16	(Germany) Nico Rosberg	Williams-Toyota	70	+1:08.505	9	
10	11	(Germany) Ralf Schumacher	Toyota	69	+1 lap	11	
11	8	(Brazil) Rubens Barrichello	Honda	69	+1 lap	13	
12	15	(Australia) Mark Webber	Red Bull-Renault	69	+1 lap	14	
13	14	(United Kingdom) David Coulthard	Red Bull-Renault	69	+1 lap	16	
14	17	(Austria) Alexander Wurz	Williams-Toyota	69	+1 lap	18	
15	4	(Finland) Heikki Kovalainen	Renault	69	+1 lap	6	
16	22	(Japan) Takuma Sato	Super Aguri-Honda	68	+2 laps	22	
17	20	(Germany) Adrian Sutil	Spyker-Ferrari	68	+2 laps	PL^{4}	
Ret	19	(United States) Scott Speed	Toro Rosso-Ferrari	55	Gearbox	15	
Ret	21	(Netherlands) Christijan Albers	Spyker-Ferrari	28	Refuelling accident	20	
Ret	23	(United Kingdom) Anthony Davidson	Super Aguri-Honda	1	Collision	19	
Ret	12	(Italy) Jarno Trulli	Toyota	1	Collision	8	
Ret	18	(Italy) Vitantonio Liuzzi	Toro Rosso-Ferrari	0	Collision	17	

Notes

- ^4 – Adrian Sutil started the race from the pitlane.

== Championship standings after the race ==
Drivers' Championship standings

+/–	Pos.	Driver	Points
	1	(United Kingdom) Lewis Hamilton	64
	2	(Spain) Fernando Alonso	50
	3	(Brazil) Felipe Massa	47
	4	(Finland) Kimi Räikkönen	42
	5	(Germany) Nick Heidfeld	30

Constructors' Championship standings

+/–	Pos.	Constructor	Points
	1	(United Kingdom) McLaren-Mercedes	114
	2	(Italy) Ferrari	89
	3	(Germany) BMW Sauber	48
	4	(France) Renault	28
	5	(United Kingdom) Williams-Toyota	13

- Note: Only the top five positions are included for both sets of standings.

== See also ==
- 2007 Magny-Cours GP2 Series round

Previous race: 2007 United States Grand Prix	FIA Formula One World Championship; 2007 season	Next race: 2007 British Grand Prix
Previous race: 2006 French Grand Prix	French Grand Prix	Next race: 2008 French Grand Prix
