= 2007 United States Grand Prix =

Coordinates: 39°47′42″N 86°14′05″W

Race 7 of 17 in the 2007 Formula One World Championship
← Previous race	Next race →
- The Indianapolis circuit, designed in 2000

Race details
- Date: June 17, 2007
- Official name: 2007 Formula 1 United States Grand Prix
- Location: Indianapolis Motor Speedway; Speedway, Indiana
- Course: Permanent racing facility
- Course length: 4.192 km (2.605 miles)
- Distance: 73 laps, 306.016 km (190.150 miles)
- Weather: Warm (33C/91F) and clear

Pole position
Driver	(United Kingdom) Lewis Hamilton	McLaren-Mercedes
- Time: 1:12.331

Fastest lap
Driver	(Finland) Kimi Räikkönen	Ferrari
- Time: 1:13.117 on lap 49

Podium
First	(United Kingdom) Lewis Hamilton	McLaren-Mercedes
Second	(Spain) Fernando Alonso	McLaren-Mercedes
Third	(Brazil) Felipe Massa	Ferrari

The 2007 United States Grand Prix (formally the 2007 Formula 1 United States Grand Prix) was a Formula One motor race held at the Indianapolis Motor Speedway in Speedway, Indiana, in the United States on June 17, 2007. The 73-lap race was the seventh race of the 2007 FIA Formula One World Championship and was won by McLaren-Mercedes driver Lewis Hamilton. His teammate, Fernando Alonso, finished the race in second position whilst Ferrari driver, Felipe Massa, completed the podium by finishing third. This was the debut race of the future four time world champion Sebastian Vettel with BMW Sauber F1 Team.

The race was Formula One's final visit to Indianapolis, after an eight-season period. The event was removed from the 2008 calendar a few months later and Formula One did not return to the United States until November 2012, at the Circuit of the Americas.

== Report ==
=== Background ===
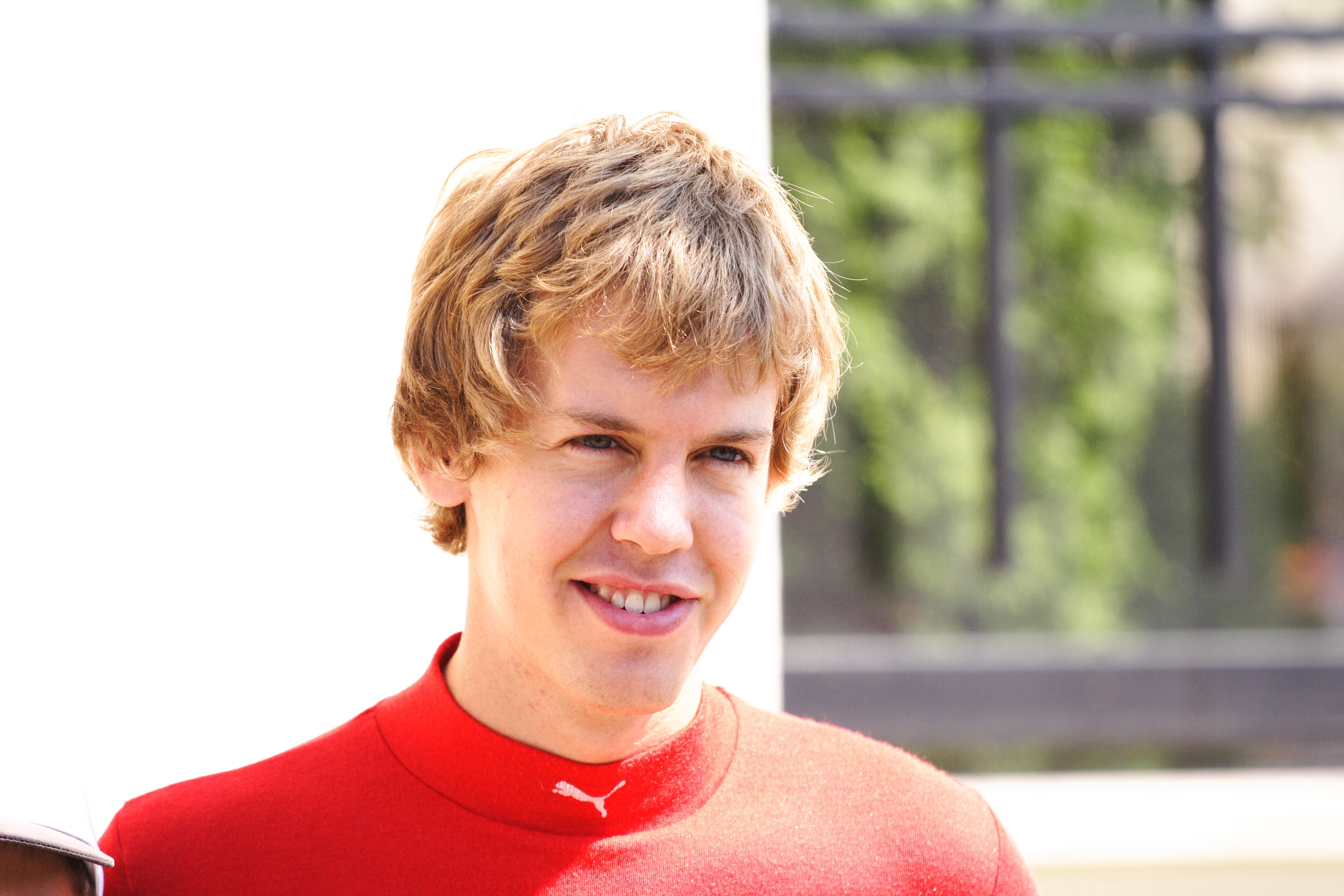
Sebastian Vettel made his debut with a one-off appearance for BMW Sauber.

Robert Kubica's massive crash at the Canadian Grand Prix resulted in the season's first driver change. Although Kubica passed the medical examination and did not seem to show any ill effects, the FIA medical delegate decided it would be best to rest him for the weekend, and not risk another concussion so close to the previous one. He was replaced in the BMW Sauber team by Formula Renault 3.5 Series championship leader, 19-year-old German Sebastian Vettel, who made his Formula One debut at the Indianapolis circuit.

=== Practice ===
Friday's morning practice was dominated by McLaren and BMW Sauber, with Fernando Alonso putting in the fastest time. Sebastian Vettel started his first race weekend with a fourth fastest time. Ferrari, who expected that their pace would return at Indianapolis, found themselves on either side of Williams driver Nico Rosberg with the fifth and seventh fastest times.

=== Qualifying ===
David Coulthard's Red Bull-Renault was the first car to leave the pit lane in part one of the qualifying session. His partner, Mark Webber, was close behind followed by the Spyker and Williams cars. With about six minutes left in the session, Coulthard spun out in turn eight. Fernando Alonso ran first, Nick Heidfeld second, and Lewis Hamilton closely behind in third. Although they struggled, both Ferraris made it, as well as Vettel. Scott Speed failed to make it out of Q1 in his native country, along with team-mate Vitantonio Liuzzi, Adrian Sutil, Takuma Sato, Alexander Wurz, and Christijan Albers.

McLaren and Ferrari began part two of their battle with Hamilton taking the top spot early. However, his team-mate, Fernando Alonso took top spot midway through. Felipe Massa, Kimi Räikkönen, and Heidfeld along with the two McLarens made the top five again. Webber made it to the next session, although his team-mate Coulthard was relegated along with 2002 United States Grand Prix winner Rubens Barrichello. Barrichello's partner Jenson Button was also relegated, along with Nico Rosberg, Anthony Davidson, and Ralf Schumacher.

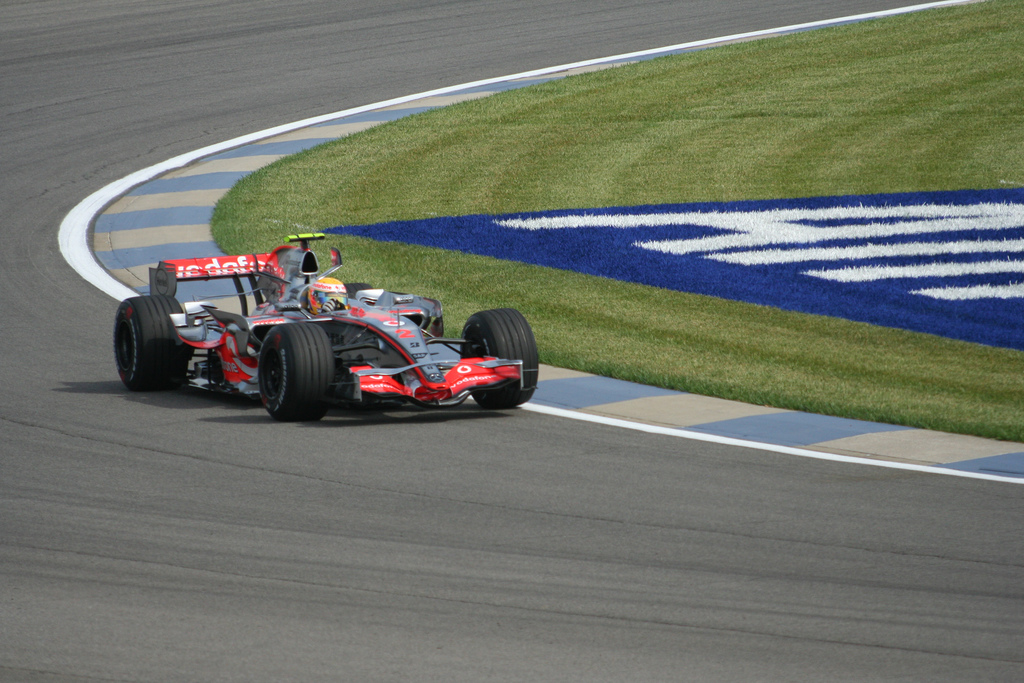
Lewis Hamilton on his way to pole position

In part three Hamilton was first out and set the quickest time with a 1:13:089. Alonso was about four tenths behind, followed by Heidfeld and the Ferraris. Giancarlo Fisichella and Heikki Kovalainen, both Renault drivers, also were near the top, but Jarno Trulli and Webber knocked Fisichella down the order. With about 5 minutes left, Massa took first spot and Räikkönen took second. Hamilton was bumped to third, Alonso fourth, and Heidfeld remained fifth. About one minute later, Hamilton took the top spot, and Alonso second. Alonso had one lap left, but could only get within about 2 tenths of a second of rookie teammate Lewis Hamilton. Massa and Räikkönen were dropped to third and fourth respectively. Heidfeld held on to fifth, with Kovalainen in sixth, bouncing back from his disappointing 22nd starting position in Canada. Vettel finished seventh, just two spots behind his temporary partner, Heidfeld. Trulli was 8th, with Red Bull-Renault's Mark Webber ninth and Fisichella tenth.

=== Race ===
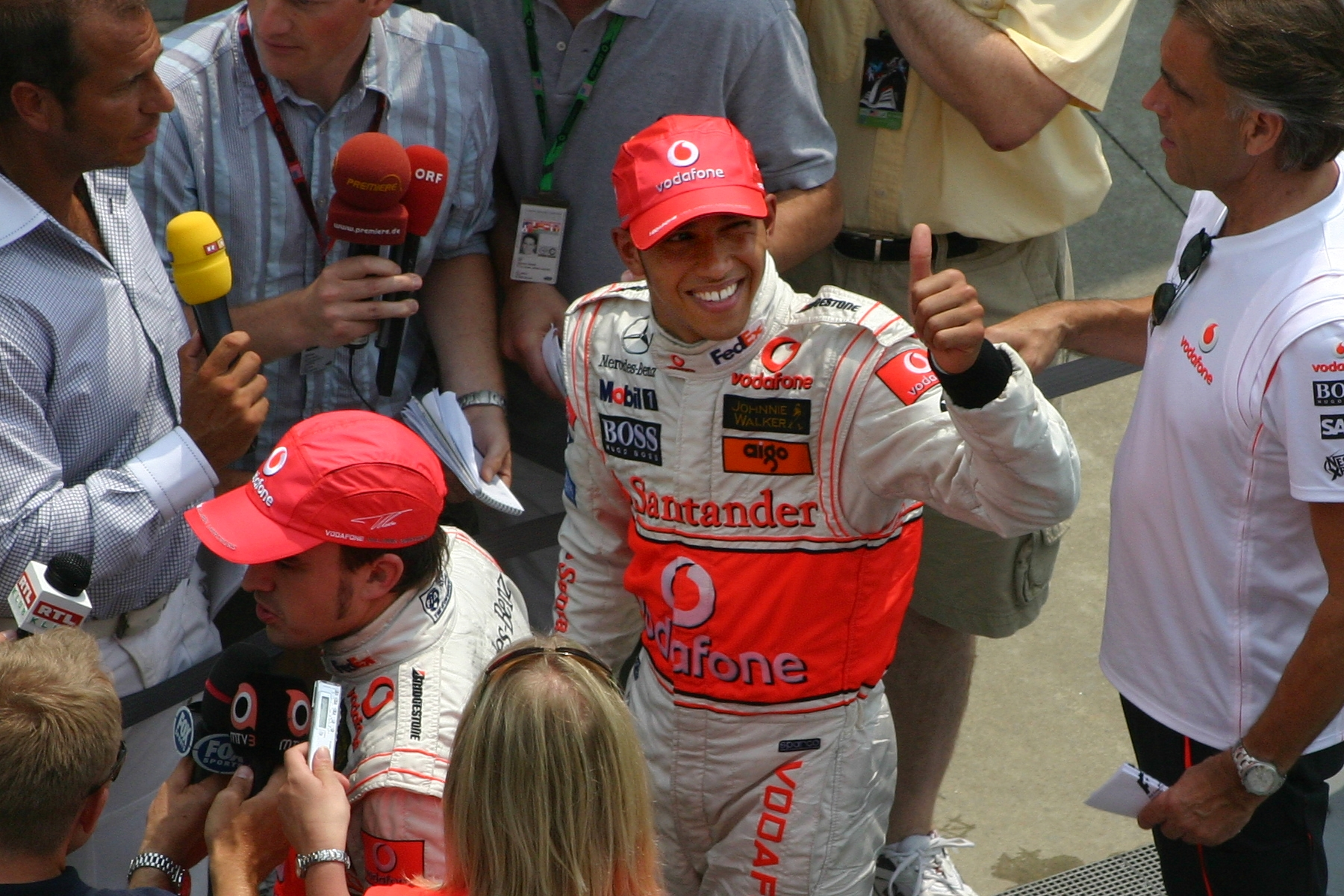
Lewis Hamilton greets press and fans after winning his second race in a row from pole

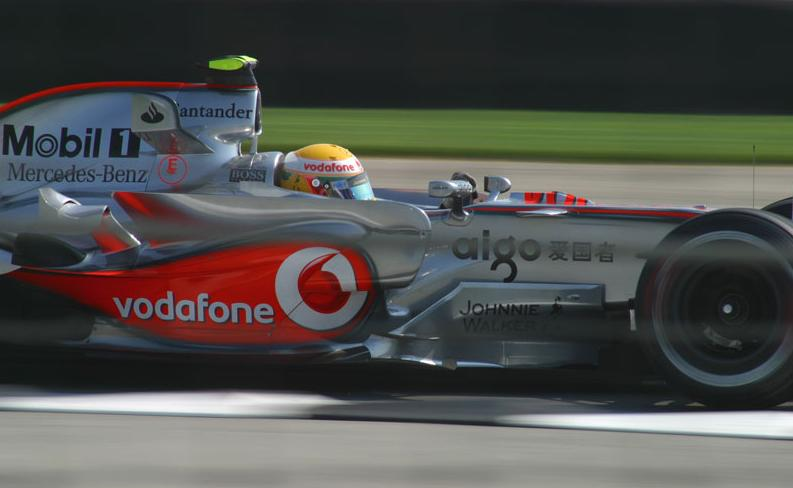
Hamilton on his way to victory in the McLaren MP4-22.

Lewis Hamilton, on the pole, sped off the grid. Fernando Alonso stayed close behind, followed by the Ferraris. The drama in turn one was in the middle of the pack. Vettel ran wide and lost places, but escaped damage. Ralf Schumacher, who started in 12th, turned in late, and ended up crashing into David Coulthard, who he had started alongside. Jenson Button and Nico Rosberg, 13th and 14th respectively, escaped but Rubens Barrichello got caught up. Schumacher was out on the spot, while Coulthard and Barrichello limped back to the pits and retired.

Later, Kimi Räikkönen was caught by Nick Heidfeld and Heikki Kovalainen. Up front, the top four were running strongly until the pit stops came around. The top four all went in early, soon followed by Heidfeld in the BMW Sauber, leaving sixth place qualifier Kovalainen in first. He led five laps, and Hamilton then regained the lead (Alonso and Massa led one lap each).

Despite a mid-race challenge from team-mate Fernando Alonso, in which the two McLaren drivers were racing side-by-side for the lead down the main straight, Hamilton maintained the lead to win his second-ever Formula One Grand Prix race, the other victory being in the previous event at Montreal. This marked McLaren's first 1-2 finish at the circuit and their first win at Indianapolis since Mika Häkkinen's final Grand Prix win in 2001.

Takuma Sato spun off at turn 3 after managing to pass Adrian Sutil. Sato had been due a drive-through penalty for overtaking under yellow flags, but this was changed to a 10-place grid penalty for the next race.

There were also three mechanical retirements – Nico Rosberg in the Williams suffered an engine failure with only five laps to go, while BMW Sauber's Nick Heidfeld and Toro Rosso's Vitantonio Liuzzi also retired from the race due to mechanical failure.

== Classification ==
=== Qualifying ===
Pos.	No.	Driver	Constructor	Q1	Q2	Q3	Grid
1	2	(United Kingdom) Lewis Hamilton	McLaren-Mercedes	1:12.563	1:12.065	1:12.331	1
2	1	(Spain) Fernando Alonso	McLaren-Mercedes	1:12.416	1:11.926	1:12.500	2
3	5	(Brazil) Felipe Massa	Ferrari	1:12.731	1:12.180	1:12.703	3
4	6	(Finland) Kimi Räikkönen	Ferrari	1:12.732	1:12.111	1:12.839	4
5	9	(Germany) Nick Heidfeld	BMW Sauber	1:12.543	1:12.188	1:12.847	5
6	4	(Finland) Heikki Kovalainen	Renault	1:12.998	1:12.599	1:13.308	6
7	10	(Germany) Sebastian Vettel	BMW Sauber	1:12.711	1:12.644	1:13.513	7
8	12	(Italy) Jarno Trulli	Toyota	1:13.186	1:12.828	1:13.789	8
9	15	(Australia) Mark Webber	Red Bull-Renault	1:13.425	1:12.788	1:13.871	9
10	3	(Italy) Giancarlo Fisichella	Renault	1:13.168	1:12.603	1:13.953	10
11	14	(United Kingdom) David Coulthard	Red Bull-Renault	1:13.424	1:12.873		11
12	11	(Germany) Ralf Schumacher	Toyota	1:12.851	1:12.920		12
13	7	(United Kingdom) Jenson Button	Honda	1:13.306	1:12.998		13
14	16	(Germany) Nico Rosberg	Williams-Toyota	1:13.128	1:13.060		14
15	8	(Brazil) Rubens Barrichello	Honda	1:13.203	1:13.201		15
16	23	(United Kingdom) Anthony Davidson	Super Aguri-Honda	1:13.164	1:13.259		16
17	17	(Austria) Alexander Wurz	Williams-Toyota	1:13.441			17
18	22	(Japan) Takuma Sato	Super Aguri-Honda	1:13.477			18
19	18	(Italy) Vitantonio Liuzzi	Toro Rosso-Ferrari	1:13.484			19
20	19	(United States) Scott Speed	Toro Rosso-Ferrari	1:13.712			20
21	20	(Germany) Adrian Sutil	Spyker-Ferrari	1:14.122			21
22	21	(Netherlands) Christijan Albers	Spyker-Ferrari	1:14.597			22

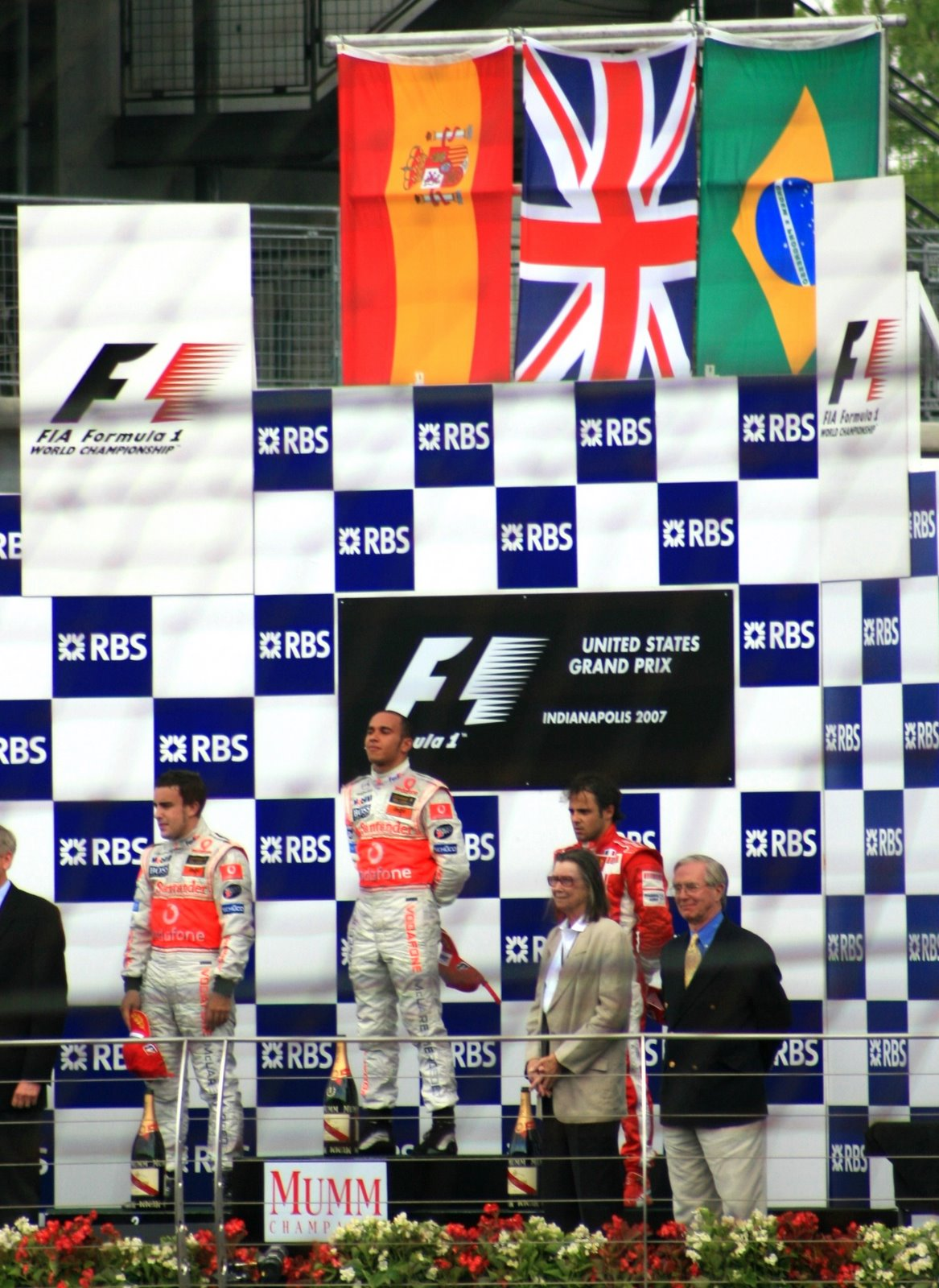
Podium for the 2007 United States Grand Prix

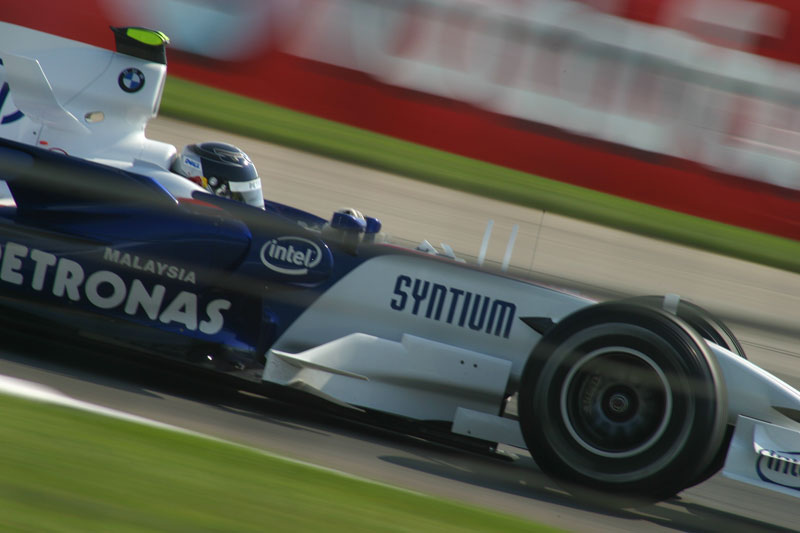
Sebastian Vettel became the then-youngest driver to score a point, aged 19 years and 349 days.

=== Race ===
Pos.	No.	Driver	Constructor	Laps	Time/Retired	Grid	Points
1	2	(United Kingdom) Lewis Hamilton	McLaren-Mercedes	73	1:31:09.965	1	10
2	1	(Spain) Fernando Alonso	McLaren-Mercedes	73	+1.518	2	8
3	5	(Brazil) Felipe Massa	Ferrari	73	+12.836	3	6
4	6	(Finland) Kimi Räikkönen	Ferrari	73	+15.422	4	5
5	4	(Finland) Heikki Kovalainen	Renault	73	+41.402	6	4
6	12	(Italy) Jarno Trulli	Toyota	73	+1:06.703	8	3
7	15	(Australia) Mark Webber	Red Bull-Renault	73	+1:07.331	9	2
8	10	(Germany) Sebastian Vettel	BMW Sauber	73	+1:07.783	7	1
9	3	(Italy) Giancarlo Fisichella	Renault	72	+1 lap	10	
10	17	(Austria) Alexander Wurz	Williams-Toyota	72	+1 lap	17	
11	23	(United Kingdom) Anthony Davidson	Super Aguri-Honda	72	+1 lap	16	
12	7	(United Kingdom) Jenson Button	Honda	72	+1 lap	13	
13	19	(United States) Scott Speed	Toro Rosso-Ferrari	71	+2 laps	20	
14	20	(Germany) Adrian Sutil	Spyker-Ferrari	71	+2 laps	21	
15	21	(Netherlands) Christijan Albers	Spyker-Ferrari	70	+3 laps	22	
16	16	(Germany) Nico Rosberg	Williams-Toyota	68	Engine	14	
17	18	(Italy) Vitantonio Liuzzi	Toro Rosso-Ferrari	68	Water pressure	19	
Ret	9	(Germany) Nick Heidfeld	BMW Sauber	55	Hydraulics	5	
Ret	22	(Japan) Takuma Sato	Super Aguri-Honda	13	Spun off	18	
Ret	14	(United Kingdom) David Coulthard	Red Bull-Renault	0	Collision damage	11	
Ret	8	(Brazil) Rubens Barrichello	Honda	0	Collision damage	15	
Ret	11	(Germany) Ralf Schumacher	Toyota	0	Collision	12	

== Championship standings after the race ==
Drivers' Championship standings

+/–	Pos.	Driver	Points
	1	(United Kingdom) Lewis Hamilton	58
	2	(Spain) Fernando Alonso	48
	3	(Brazil) Felipe Massa	39
	4	(Finland) Kimi Räikkönen	32
	5	(Germany) Nick Heidfeld	26

Constructors' Championship standings

+/–	Pos.	Constructor	Points
	1	(United Kingdom) McLaren-Mercedes	106
	2	(Italy) Ferrari	71
	3	(Germany) BMW Sauber	39
	4	(France) Renault	25
	5	(United Kingdom) Williams-Toyota	13

- Note: Only the top five positions are included for both sets of standings.

Previous race: 2007 Canadian Grand Prix	FIA Formula One World Championship; 2007 season	Next race: 2007 French Grand Prix
Previous race: 2006 United States Grand Prix	United States Grand Prix	Next race: 2012 United States Grand Prix
Awards
Preceded by 2006 Brazilian Grand Prix	Formula One Promotional Trophy for Race Promoter; 2007	Succeeded by 2008 Singapore Grand Prix
