= Anthony Davidson =

British racing driver (born 1979)

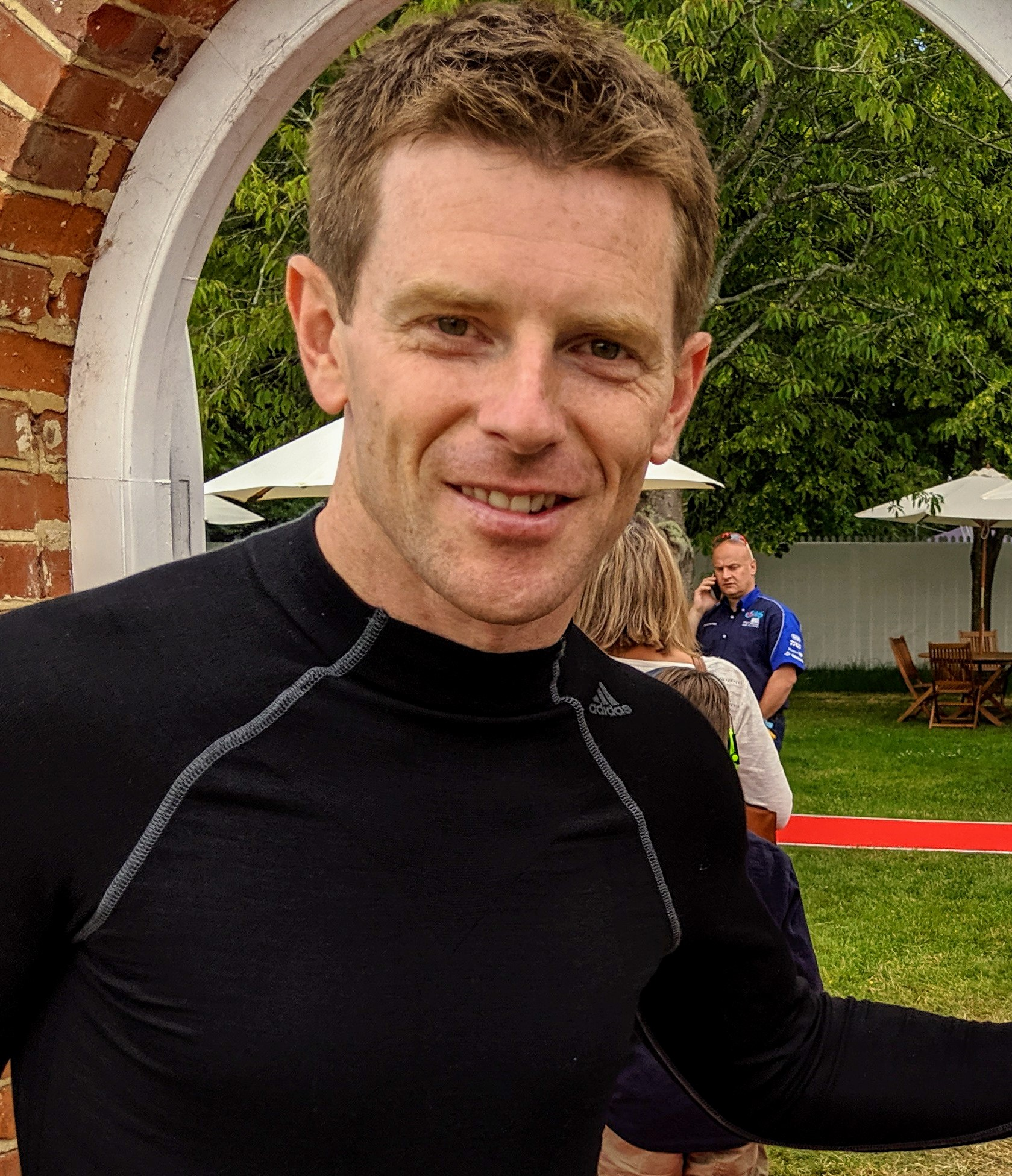
- Davidson in 2019
- Born: Anthony Denis Davidson; 18 April 1979 (age 47); Hemel Hempstead, Hertfordshire, England
- Spouse: Carrie Bond (m. 2006)
- Children: 2

FIA World Endurance Championship career
- Categorisation: FIA Platinum
- Years active: 2012–2021
- Teams: Toyota, DragonSpeed, Jota
- Starts: 59
- Championships: 1 (2014)
- Wins: 13
- Podiums: 31
- Poles: 4
- Fastest laps: 2
- Best finish: 1st in 2014 (LMP1)

Formula One World Championship career
- Nationality: (United Kingdom) British
- Active years: 2002, 2005, 2007–2008
- Team(s): Minardi, BAR, Super Aguri
- Entries: 24 (24 starts)
- Championships: 0
- Wins: 0
- Podiums: 0
- Career points: 0
- Pole positions: 0
- Fastest laps: 0
- First entry: 2002 Hungarian Grand Prix
- Last entry: 2008 Spanish Grand Prix

24 Hours of Le Mans career
- Years: 2003, 2009–2017, 2019–2021
- Teams: Prodrive, Aston Martin, Peugeot, Toyota, DragonSpeed, Jota
- Best finish: 2nd (2013)
- Class wins: 0

Anthony Denis Davidson (born 18 April 1979) is a British former racing driver and broadcaster who competed in Formula One between 2002 and 2008, (Note: The exact years Davidson competed in Formula One: 2002, 2005, 2007–2008.) and the FIA World Endurance Championship from 2012 to 2021. In endurance racing, Davidson won the FIA World Endurance Drivers' Championship in 2014 with Toyota.

Born in Hemel Hempstead, Davidson began competitive kart racing aged eight, winning several national championships. He graduated to junior formulae in 1999, where he took several titles in Formula Ford and Formula Three. A test driver for BAR in 2001 and 2002, Davidson debuted in Formula One at the latter Hungarian Grand Prix, replacing Alex Yoong at Minardi for two Grands Prix. He remained a test driver for BAR—later known as Honda—until 2007, when he was signed to a full-time seat with Super Aguri alongside Takuma Sato; he finished a career-best eleventh at the Spanish, Canadian, and United States Grands Prix in the SA07.

Amidst financial troubles, Super Aguri withdrew from the sport after the Spanish Grand Prix in 2008, ending both Davidson and Sato's driving careers in Formula One. Following his departure, Davidson moved into sportscar racing, competing in the premier LMP1 class of the FIA World Endurance Championship from 2012 to 2017 with Toyota, winning the series in 2014 alongside Sébastien Buemi. From 40 starts in the top class of WEC, Davidson took 13 wins and claimed runner-up at the 2013 24 Hours of Le Mans. He entered three further seasons in the LMP2 class with DragonSpeed and Jota, before retiring at the end of his 2021 campaign.

Beyond his racing career, Davidson became a commentator and pundit with the BBC in 2009, and has worked with Sky Sports F1 since 2012. He has also lent his voice to 11 editions of the F1 video game series and has served as a lead commentator on the global feed of WEC.

== Driving career ==
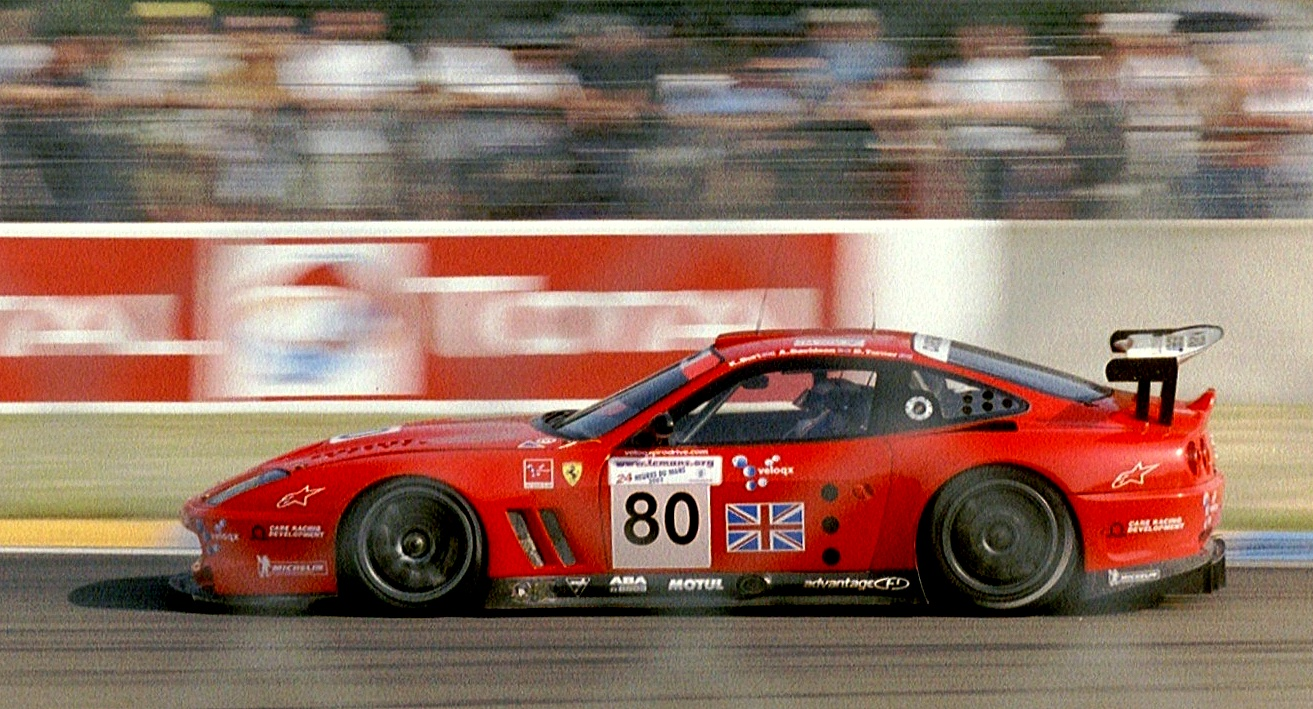
Davidson making his Le Mans debut in 2003

Born in Hemel Hempstead, Hertfordshire, Davidson began kart racing in 1987, competing in various British, European and North American championships. He won three British championships (93, 94, 95), one Italian championship and was runner-up in the Formula A European championship in 1996. In 1999, he moved to single seater cars, racing Formula Fords and winning the 1600 cc Kent engine class of the British Formula Ford festival that year. The following season, he was runner-up in the British Formula Ford championship but did win the blue riband Formula Ford Festival at Brands Hatch and scooped the McLaren/Autosport Young Driver of the Year Award.

In 2001, Davidson competed in the British Formula Three championship with the Carlin team, finishing second overall to teammate Takuma Sato. His performance improved throughout the season and he outscored Sato from June until the season's end. He also won the Formula Three Pau Grand Prix, the Spa Masters and the FIA European Cup.

=== Formula One ===
==== BAR and Minardi ====
In late 2000, Davidson became the test driver for the British American Racing (BAR) Formula One team for the 2001 season. The following season Davidson started two races for the Minardi team, temporarily replacing regular driver Alex Yoong, who the team had decided to suspend after he had failed to qualify for three races. Minardi had originally planned to put Justin Wilson in the car, but he proved too tall. Davidson's qualifying times were within 0.6s of teammate Mark Webber at his two starts in Hungary and Belgium, but he spun out of both events.

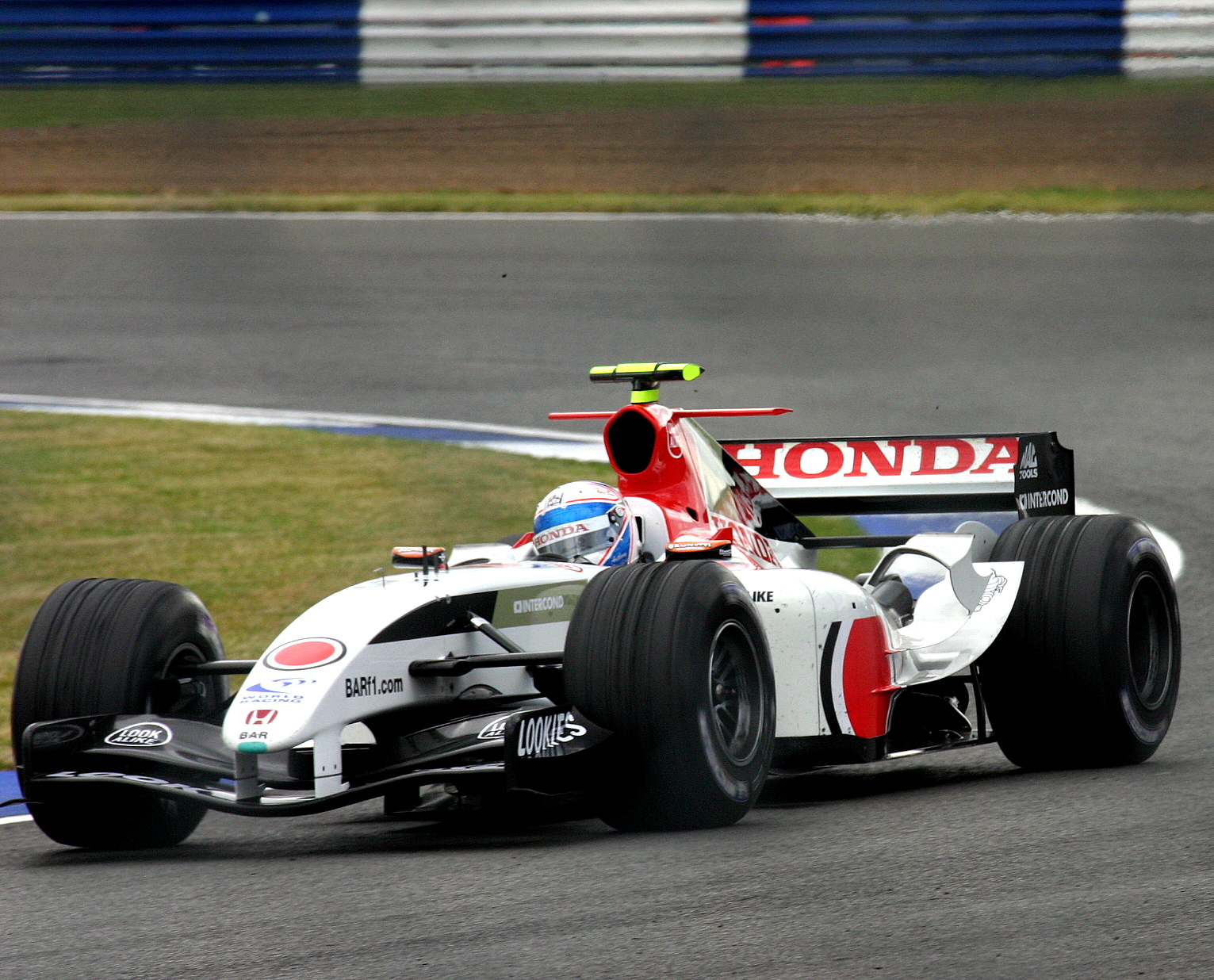
Davidson during practice at the 2004 British Grand Prix

Davidson was not given a chance to race in 2003 and remained as test driver at BAR. Race drivers were Jacques Villeneuve and Davidson's countryman Jenson Button who joined the team from Renault. When Takuma Sato was promoted to the race team following the departure of Villeneuve, it presented Davidson with the opportunity to become third driver. This was especially useful in 2004 as BAR were able to run a third car in Friday morning testing, which became Davidson's duty. He frequently impressed with his pace, other teams frequently taking note of his consistent lap times for tyre degradation data, e.g. at Indianapolis he set the second fastest lap time in Friday practice after 19 laps.

In November 2004, BAR announced that it had failed to come to an acceptable contractual agreement with the Williams team to allow Davidson to drive for Williams in 2005 because Williams would not agree to his unconditional "repatriation" to BAR in 2006. Given BAR's long-term contract on Davidson, his chance of securing a race seat for 2005 was therefore called into serious doubt. He was given the opportunity to fill in for an unwell Sato at the 2005 Malaysian Grand Prix, but his engine expired just two laps into the event.

==== Honda ====
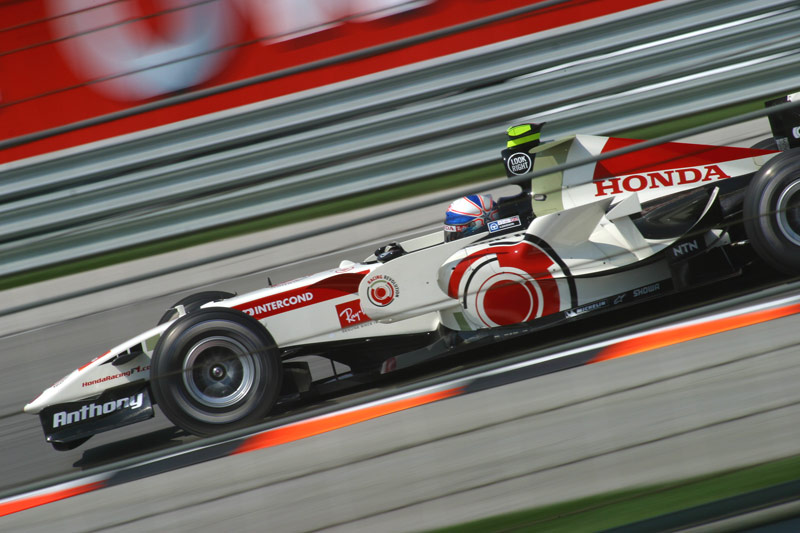
Davidson as Honda's third driver at the 2006 United States Grand Prix.

In 2006, Davidson resumed his role as test driver for BAR, now owned by Honda and renamed Honda Racing F1. As BAR had failed to be one of the top four constructors the previous season Honda were able to run a third car on Friday, giving Davidson a bigger role than in 2005. Having previously done some radio commentary work for BBC Radio 5 Live, in 2006, he made his debut as a television commentator, standing in for the absent Martin Brundle for ITV Sport at the Hungarian Grand Prix, which was won by Jenson Button and the Honda team. In 2008, Davidson returned to Honda as test driver for the testing at Spain's Circuit de Catalunya whilst Honda test driver Alexander Wurz was racing at Le Mans.

==== Super Aguri ====
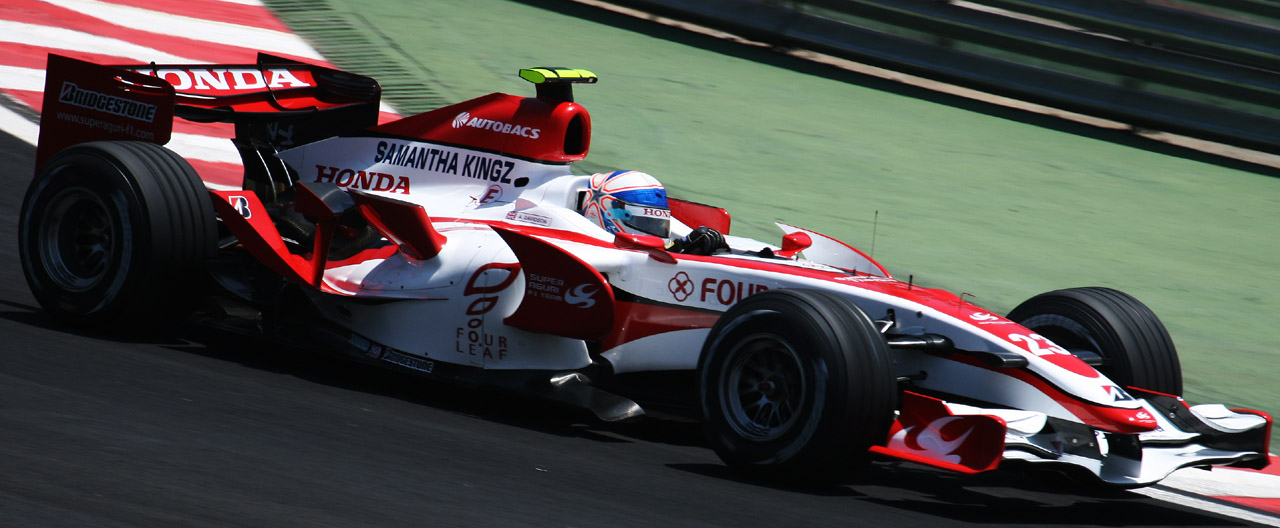
Davidson driving for Super Aguri at the 2007 Brazilian Grand Prix.

On 15 November 2006, Super Aguri confirmed that Davidson would partner Takuma Sato for the 2007 Formula One season. Thus, he became a regular Formula One driver for the first time.

At the 2007 Canadian Grand Prix, Davidson was running third when his car struck a groundhog on the straight before the pits, ultimately putting him back to 11th place and ending his bid for his first career points. At the Hungarian Grand Prix, Davidson's rear suspension was broken during a collision with Giancarlo Fisichella, which forced him to retire. Davidson finished the season in 23rd place having scored no points.

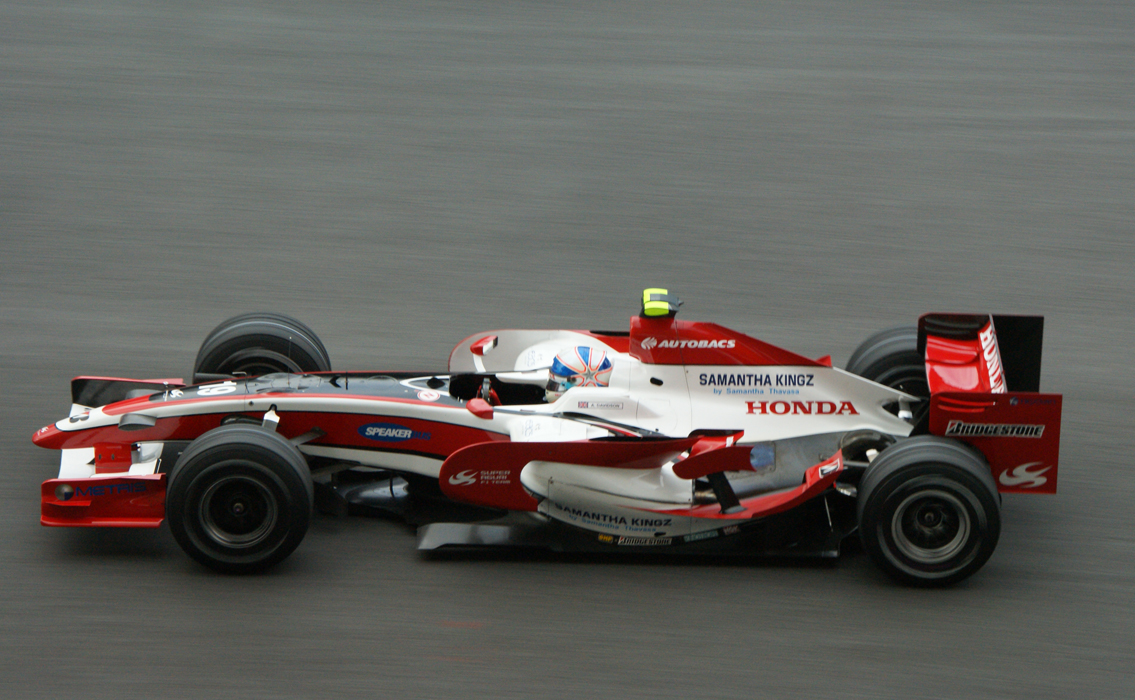
Davidson driving for Super Aguri at the 2008 Malaysian Grand Prix.

Amid financial problems which threatened their continued participation in Formula One, Super Aguri retained Davidson alongside teammate Sato for 2008. However, on 6 May 2008, Super Aguri withdrew from the Championship leaving Davidson without a race seat.

==== Return to Honda ====
Davidson was announced as a Honda test driver for the remainder of 2008. On 5 December 2008 Honda pulled out of Formula One due to financial problems. Ross Brawn bought out the team and formed Brawn GP and Davidson signed on as a test driver. On 16 November 2009, engine suppliers Mercedes-Benz bought out Brawn GP and renamed the team Mercedes GP. Davidson continued in his role as reserve and development driver.

==== Mercedes (2010–present) ====
Davidson was linked with incoming teams Virgin and Lotus for the 2010 F1 season. However, Davidson did not secure a 2010 race seat in F1, and instead turned his focus to racing sports cars. In F1 he continued his long-standing relationship with the Brackley-based Mercedes F1 Team, combining duties as reserve and simulator driver in 2010 and 2011, and continuing his simulator role from 2012.

=== CART ===
Davidson tested a Champ Car at Road America in 2002 with Team KOOL Green, to assist the team with traction control development. The test was arranged by Honda, Davidson's employer in Formula 1 at the time.

=== Sportscars ===
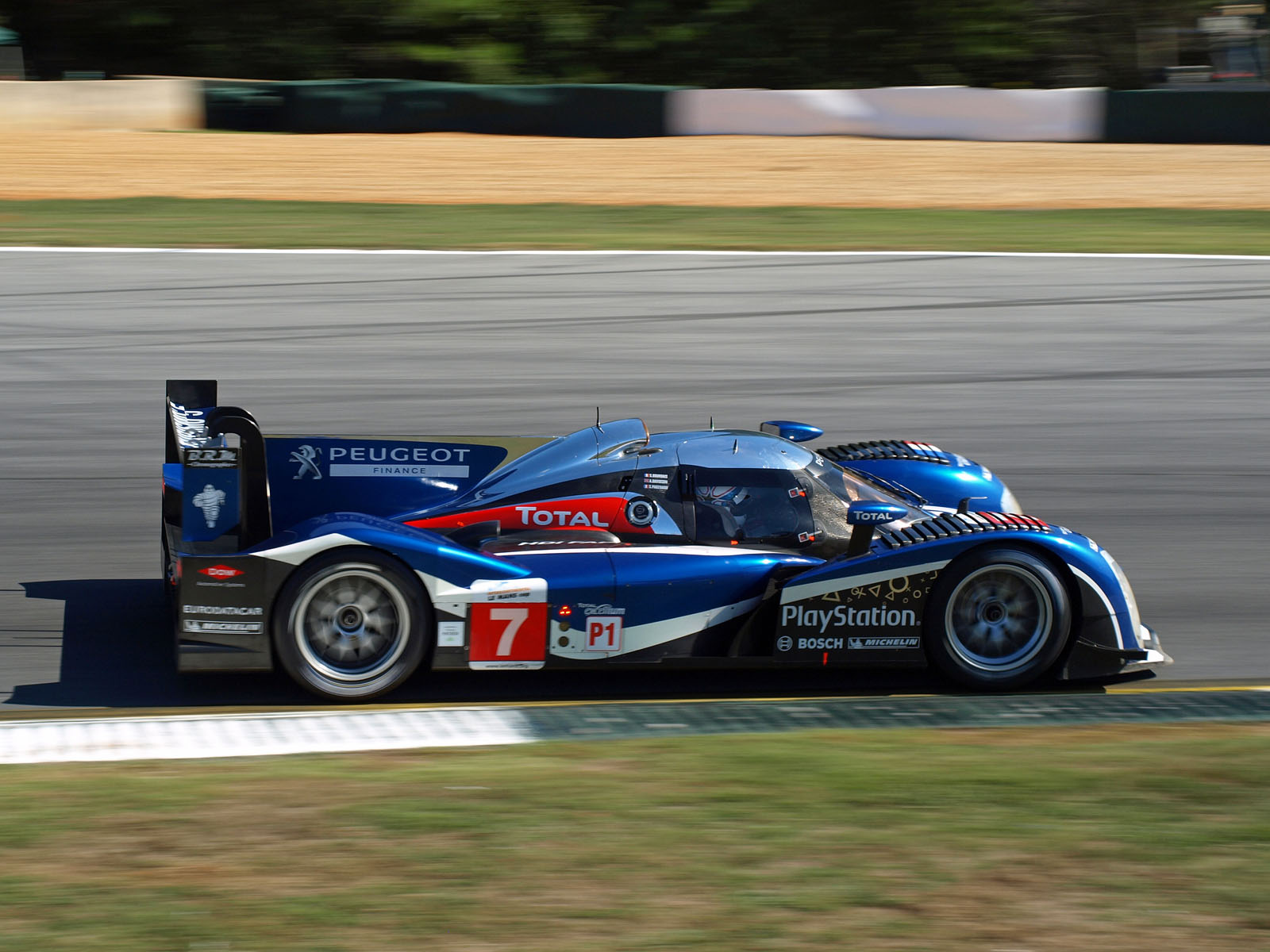
Davidson at Road Atlanta for the 2011 Petit Le Mans race.

Davidson raced for the Aston Martin Racing team in the 2009 24 Hours of Le Mans, alongside Darren Turner and Jos Verstappen. His team entered a Lola-Aston Martin B09/60 in the LMP1 class, which finished 13th overall in the race. He returned in the 2010 edition, driving for defending champions Team Peugeot Total alongside Alexander Wurz and Marc Gené. The trio warmed up for Le Mans by leading a Peugeot 1–2 in the 2010 12 Hours of Sebring. However, in the Le Mans race his Peugeot car had an engine failure while leading. Following Le Mans, Davidson raced at the 2010 6 Hours of Silverstone with Nicolas Minassian and secured victory for Peugeot Sport. In October 2010, Davidson secured pole position at Petit Le Mans, and went on to finish second with teammates Alex Wurz and Marc Gené.

In 2011, racing the 908 for Peugeot Sport, Davidson along with Wurz and Gené, won the 6 Hours of Spa, and finished fourth at the Le Mans 24 Hours. Teaming up with Sébastien Bourdais, Davidson went on to win the 6 Hours of Imola, and the 6 Hours of Zhuhai, victories which helped Peugeot Sport secure the Intercontinental Le Mans Cup (ILMC) Championship for the second year running.

With Peugeot pulling out of factory sports car competition, Davidson signed with Toyota to drive its Toyota TS030 Hybrid in the 2012 24 Hours of Le Mans. Five hours into the race, as Davidson was lapping the AF Corse Ferrari 458 Italia GTC of Piergiuseppe Perazzini, the two cars collided at the end of the Mulsanne Straight. The collision turned Davidson's car sideways before becoming airborne, flipping through the air, before landing back on its three remaining wheels before making heavy contact with the barriers. Davidson got out of his car before calling for assistance; he was later transferred to hospital where he was later diagnosed with fractures to the eleventh and twelfth thoracic vertebrae of his back.

In 2013, Davidson continued driving with Toyota for a full season and ended with third place in the drivers' championship and 2nd place at Le Mans with teammates Buemi and Sarrazin. For the 2014 season he remained with the Toyota works team and drove Toyota's new car, the Toyota TS040 Hybrid. During the year, he won four races and finished third in the 2014 24 Hours of Le Mans, and became 2014 World Endurance Drivers' Champion alongside co-driver Sébastien Buemi. The following two years were less successful, yielding only two third-place finishes and championship finishes in fifth in 2015 and eighth in 2016.

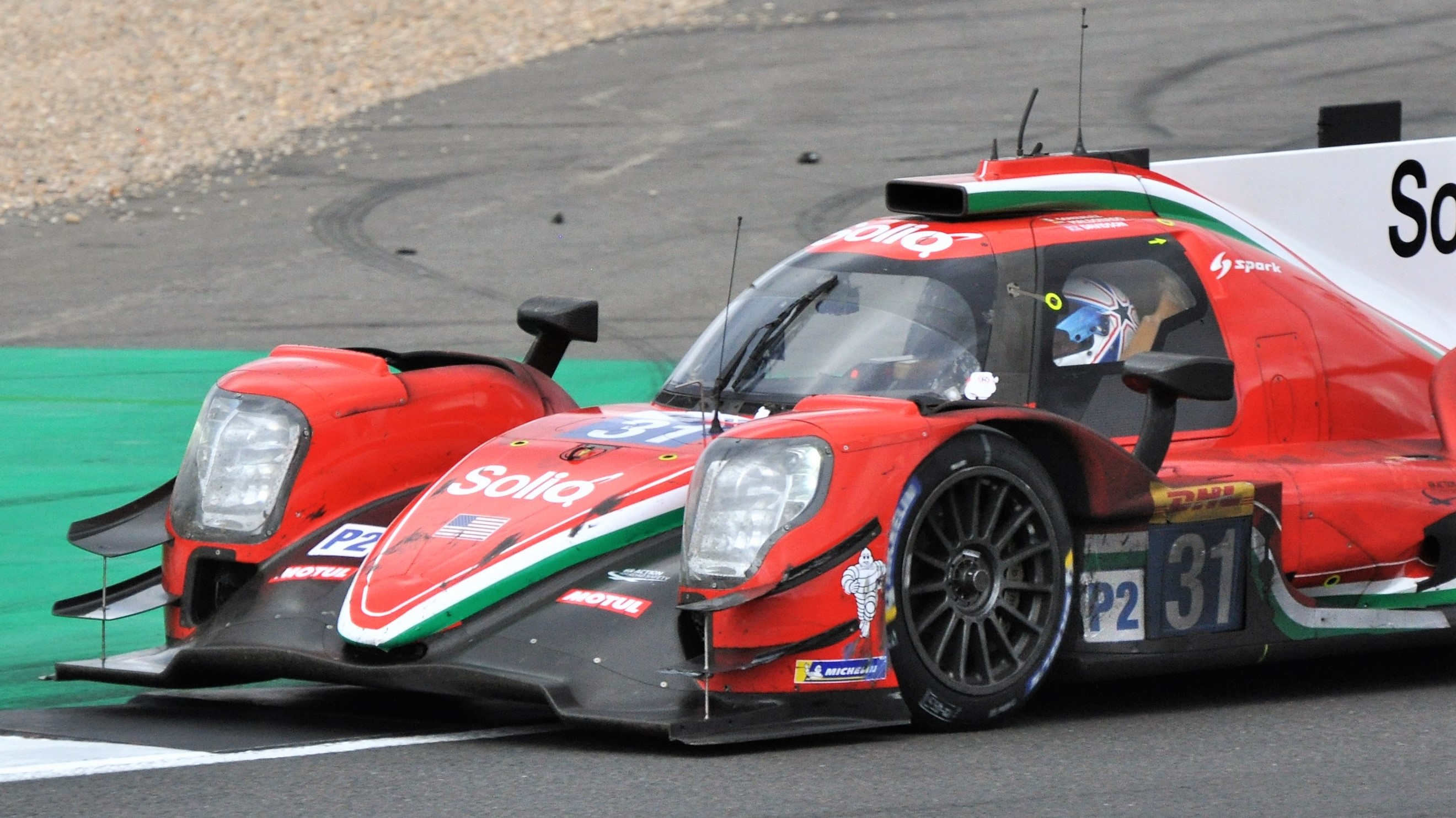
Davidson driving an Oreca 07 for DragonSpeed, at Silverstone Circuit in 2018

The 2017 FIA World Endurance Championship season showed an improvement in form, and Davidson and his co-drivers took five victories and one further podium finish for the Toyota team during the campaign. However, the performance of the Porsche team, a sixth-place finish at Le Mans, and missing the 2017 6 Hours of Circuit of the Americas due to "personal reasons", contributed to Davidson finishing the season only third in the drivers' championship standings.

Despite his 2017 performance, Davidson was the crew member of the No. 8 Toyota entry who was moved aside to allow Fernando Alonso to contest the 2018–19 FIA World Endurance Championship. Toyota switched Davidson backward into a test and reserve role, and he did not compete in the first two races of the 'superseason', including the 2018 24 Hours of Le Mans. He made his first race appearance in 2018 at Silverstone, driving in the LMP2 class for American team DragonSpeed, where he finished fourth in class.

== Non-driving activities ==
=== Commentating ===
Davidson has since been heard as a co-commentator on selected Grands Prix for BBC Radio 5 Live. This became permanent on 13 February 2009, when it was announced he would commentate alongside David Croft for the 2009 season. Davidson continued in the role through 2010 into 2011, as the BBC decided on an unchanged lineup for its radio Formula One coverage. On 7 December 2011, Sky Sports announced that Davidson would join its British team as an analyst for race weekends, and would be commentating on practice sessions from the 2012 season.

Davidson commentated alongside Croft for the 2017 Hungarian Grand Prix to cover for Paul di Resta who was needed by Williams to cover for the ill Felipe Massa. Di Resta was himself covering for regular commentator Martin Brundle who was absent through illness with the same condition that afflicted Massa.

Davidson is also one of the lead commentators on the FIA World Endurance Championship world feed along with Martin Haven and Graham Goodwin, starting in the 2022 season.

=== Helmet ===
In the studio for 2013 USA Grand Prix qualifying, Davidson admitted that his design was inspired by Eddie Cheever's helmet. When he was in the early karting days of his career he saw the picture of Cheever's helmet and together with his father, who was a graphic designer, changed the colours from the Arizona state flag to the colours of the UK and EU flags, which he has been using for all of his career.

=== Codemasters Formula One games ===
Davidson has been working as an advisor for Codemasters since 2009 with F1 2009, and F1 2010 which was released in September 2010. His helmet design is available to select for the user's driver in the game. He later worked with Codemasters-Birmingham on F1 2011 and F1 2012. Davidson and David Croft appeared in F1 2015, F1 2016, F1 2017, F1 2018, F1 2019, F1 2020, F1 2021, F1 22, F1 23, F1 24 and F1 25 as commentators.

== Personal life ==
On 11 August 2006, Davidson married his girlfriend Carrie in Banbury, Oxfordshire. The couple live in Brackley. His brother Andrew Davidson appeared in the first series of Big Brother in the UK. When Andrew was up for eviction in week two, housemate Darren nominated him, giving as a reason that his brother had a race the following week and he would want to leave the house to see him. Andrew was evicted that week.

Davidson was friends growing up with the late Dan Wheldon, who competed in IndyCar.

== Racing record ==
=== Career summary ===
Season	Series	Team	Races	Wins	Poles	F/Laps	Podiums	Points	Position
1999	British Formula Ford Winter Series	Haywood Racing Preparations	?	?	?	?	?	47	**1st**
2000	Formula Renault 2000 Eurocup	Manor Motorsport	3	0	0	0	0	4	29th
2000	British Formula Ford Championship	Haywood Racing	13	3	2	5	9	122	**3rd**
2000	Formula Ford Festival World Cup	Haywood Racing	1	1	1	0	1	N/A	**1st**
2001	British Formula 3 Championship	Carlin Motorsport	26	6	7	6	14	272	**2nd**
2001	European Formula Three Cup Series	Carlin Motorsport	1	1	1	1	1	N/A	**1st**
2001	Masters of Formula 3	Carlin Motorsport	1	0	0	0	1	N/A	**3rd**
2001	Formula One	Lucky Strike BAR Honda	Test driver						
2002	Formula One	KL Minardi Asiatech	2	0	0	0	0	0	NC
2003	American Le Mans Series – GTS	Veloqx Prodrive Racing	2	0	0	0	2	44	11th
2003	24 Hours of Le Mans – GTS	Veloqx Prodrive Racing	1	0	0	0	0	N/A	DNF
2003	Formula One	Lucky Strike BAR Honda	Test driver						
2004	Formula One	Lucky Strike BAR Honda	Third driver						
2005	Formula One	Lucky Strike BAR Honda	1	0	0	0	0	0	NC
2006	Formula One	Honda Racing F1	Test driver						
2007	Formula One	Super Aguri F1 Team	17	0	0	0	0	0	23rd
2008	Formula One	Super Aguri F1 Team	4	0	0	0	0	0	22nd
2009	24 Hours of Le Mans	Aston Martin Racing	1	0	0	0	0	N/A	13th
2009	FIA GT Championship – GT1	Nissan Motorsport	1	0	0	0	1	N/A	NC‡
2009	Formula One	Brawn GP F1 Team	Reserve driver						
2010	American Le Mans Series	Peugeot Sport^{†}	2	1	1	0	2	N/A	NC‡
2010	Le Mans Series	Peugeot Sport^{†}	2	1	0	0	1	11	15th
2010	24 Hours of Le Mans	Peugeot Sport^{†}	1	0	0	0	0	N/A	DNF
2010	Formula One	Mercedes GP Petronas F1 Team	Reserve driver						
2011	American Le Mans Series	Peugeot Sport^{†}	2	0	1	0	0	N/A	NC‡
2011	Le Mans Series	Peugeot Sport^{†}	2	2	1	0	2	31	NC‡
2011	24 Hours of Le Mans	Peugeot Sport^{†}	1	0	0	0	0	N/A	4th
2011	Formula One	Mercedes GP Petronas F1 Team	Reserve driver						
2012	24 Hours of Le Mans	Toyota Racing	1	0	0	0	0	N/A	DNF
2012	Formula One	Mercedes AMG Petronas F1 Team	Simulator driver						
2013	FIA World Endurance Championship	Toyota Racing	8	1	0	0	4	106.25	**3rd**
2013	24 Hours of Le Mans	Toyota Racing	1	0	0	0	1	N/A	**2nd**
2013	Formula One	Mercedes AMG Petronas F1 Team	Simulator driver						
2014	FIA World Endurance Championship	Toyota Racing	8	4	2	1	7	166	**1st**
2014	24 Hours of Le Mans	Toyota Racing	1	0	0	0	1	N/A	**3rd**
2014	Formula One	Mercedes AMG Petronas F1 Team	Simulator driver						
2015	FIA World Endurance Championship	Toyota Racing	8	0	0	0	1	79	5th
2015	24 Hours of Le Mans	Toyota Racing	1	0	0	0	0	N/A	8th
2015	Formula One	Mercedes AMG Petronas F1 Team	Simulator driver						
2016	FIA World Endurance Championship	Toyota Gazoo Racing	8	0	0	0	1	60	8th
2016	24 Hours of Le Mans	Toyota Gazoo Racing	1	0	0	0	0	N/A	NC
2016	Formula One	Mercedes AMG Petronas F1 Team	Simulator driver						
2017	FIA World Endurance Championship	Toyota Gazoo Racing	8	5	0	0	6	168	**3rd**
2017	24 Hours of Le Mans	Toyota Gazoo Racing	1	0	0	0	0	N/A	8th
2017	Formula One	Mercedes AMG Petronas Motorsport	Simulator driver						
2018	Formula One	Mercedes AMG Petronas Motorsport	Simulator driver						
2018–19	FIA World Endurance Championship – LMP2	DragonSpeed	6	1	1	1	3	83	5th
2019	24 Hours of Le Mans – LMP2	DragonSpeed	1	0	0	0	0	N/A	DNF
2019	Formula One	Mercedes AMG Petronas Motorsport	Simulator driver						
2019–20	FIA World Endurance Championship – LMP2	Jota Sport	7	1	0	0	5	142	4th
2020	European Le Mans Series	Jota Sport	1	0	0	0	0	N/A	NC‡
2020	24 Hours of Le Mans – LMP2	Jota Sport	1	0	0	0	1	N/A	**2nd**
2020	Formula One	Mercedes-AMG Petronas F1 Team	Simulator driver						
2021	FIA World Endurance Championship – LMP2	Jota Sport	6	1	1	0	4	123	**3rd**
2021	24 Hours of Le Mans – LMP2	Jota Sport	1	0	0	0	0	N/A	8th
2021	Formula One	Mercedes-AMG Petronas F1 Team	Simulator driver						
2022	Formula One	Mercedes-AMG Petronas F1 Team	Simulator driver						
2023	Formula One	Mercedes-AMG Petronas F1 Team	Simulator driver						
2024	Formula One	Mercedes-AMG Petronas F1 Team	Simulator driver						
2025	Formula One	Mercedes-AMG Petronas F1 Team	Simulator driver						
2026	Formula One	Mercedes-AMG Petronas F1 Team	Development driver						

† In addition to competing in the 24 Hours of Le Mans race, Peugeot Sport only contested selected events in the 2010 and 2011 Le Mans and American Le Mans Series.
^{‡} As Davidson was a guest driver, he was ineligible for points.

=== Complete British Formula Three Championship results ===
(key) (Races in bold indicate pole position) (Races in italics indicate fastest lap)

Year	Entrant	Engine	1	2	3	4	5	6	7	8	9	10	11	12	13	14	15	16	17	18	19	20	21	22	23	24	25	26	27	DC	Pts
2001	Carlin Motorsport	Mugen	SIL1; 1; 7	SIL1; 2; 11	SNE; 1; 8	SNE; 2; 13	DON1; 1; 8	DON1; 2 Ret	OUL; 1; 3	**OUL**; **2**; 3	CRO; 1; 1	CRO; 2; 12	ROC; 1; 4	**ROC**; **2**; 2	CAS; 1; 1	**CAS**; **2**; 1	BRH1; 1; 5	BRH1; 2; 19	DON2; 1 Ret	DON2; 2; 5	KNO; 1; 2	**KNO**; **2** C	**THR**; **1**; 2	**THR**; **2**; 1	**THR**; **3**; 1	**BRH2**; **1**; 1	BRH2; 2; 3	SIL2; 1; 2	SIL2; 2; 2	2nd	272

=== Complete Formula One results ===
(key) (Races in bold indicate pole position; races in italics indicate fastest lap)

Year	Entrant	Chassis	Engine	1	2	3	4	5	6	7	8	9	10	11	12	13	14	15	16	17	18	19	WDC	Points
2002	KL Minardi Asiatech	Minardi PS02	Asiatech AT02 3.0 V10	AUS	MAL	BRA	SMR	ESP	AUT	MON	CAN	EUR	GBR	FRA	GER	HUN; Ret	BEL; Ret	ITA	USA	JPN			NC	0
2004	Lucky Strike BAR Honda	BAR 006	Honda RA004E 3.0 V10	AUS; TD	MAL; TD	BHR; TD	SMR; TD	ESP; TD	MON; TD	EUR; TD	CAN; TD	USA; TD	FRA; TD	GBR; TD	GER; TD	HUN; TD	BEL; TD	ITA; TD	CHN; TD	JPN; TD	BRA; TD		–	–
2005	Lucky Strike BAR Honda	BAR 007	Honda RA005E 3.0 V10	AUS	MAL; Ret	BHR	SMR	ESP	MON	EUR	CAN	USA	FRA	GBR	GER	HUN	TUR	ITA	BEL	BRA	JPN	CHN	NC	0
2006	Lucky Strike Honda Racing F1 Team	Honda RA106	Honda RA806E 2.4 V8	BHR; TD	MAL; TD	AUS; TD	SMR; TD	EUR; TD	ESP; TD	MON; TD	GBR; TD	CAN; TD	USA; TD	FRA; TD	GER; TD	HUN; TD	TUR; TD	ITA; TD	CHN; TD	JPN; TD	BRA; TD		–	–
2007	Super Aguri F1 Team	Super Aguri SA07	Honda RA807E 2.4 V8	AUS; 16	MAL; 16	BHR; 16^{†}	ESP; 11	MON; 18	CAN; 11	USA; 11	FRA; Ret	GBR; Ret	EUR; 12	HUN; Ret	TUR; 14	ITA; 14	BEL; 16	JPN; Ret	CHN; Ret	BRA; 14			23rd	0
2008	Super Aguri F1 Team	Super Aguri SA08	Honda RA808E 2.4 V8	AUS; Ret	MAL; 15	BHR; 16	ESP; Ret	TUR	MON	CAN	FRA	GBR	GER	HUN	EUR	BEL	ITA	SIN	JPN	CHN	BRA		22nd	0

† Did not finish the race, but was classified as he had completed more than 90% of the race distance.

=== Complete 24 Hours of Le Mans results ===
Year	Team	Co-Drivers	Car	Class	Laps	Pos.	Class Pos.
2003	(United Kingdom) Veloqx Prodrive Racing	(United Kingdom) Kelvin Burt (United Kingdom) Darren Turner	Ferrari 550-GTS Maranello	GTS	176	DNF	DNF
2009	(United Kingdom) Aston Martin Racing	(United Kingdom) Darren Turner (Netherlands) Jos Verstappen	Lola-Aston Martin B09/60	LMP1	342	13th	11th
2010	(France) Team Peugeot Total	(Austria) Alexander Wurz (Spain) Marc Gené	Peugeot 908 HDi FAP	LMP1	360	DNF	DNF
2011	(France) Peugeot Sport Total	(Austria) Alexander Wurz (Spain) Marc Gené	Peugeot 908	LMP1	351	4th	4th
2012	(Japan) Toyota Racing	(Switzerland) Sébastien Buemi (France) Stéphane Sarrazin	Toyota TS030 Hybrid	LMP1	82	DNF	DNF
2013	(Japan) Toyota Racing	(Switzerland) Sébastien Buemi (France) Stéphane Sarrazin	Toyota TS030 Hybrid	LMP1	347	**2nd**	**2nd**
2014	(Japan) Toyota Racing	(Switzerland) Sébastien Buemi (France) Nicolas Lapierre	Toyota TS040 Hybrid	LMP1-H	374	**3rd**	**3rd**
2015	(Japan) Toyota Racing	(Switzerland) Sébastien Buemi (Japan) Kazuki Nakajima	Toyota TS040 Hybrid	LMP1	386	8th	8th
2016	(Japan) Toyota Gazoo Racing	(Switzerland) Sébastien Buemi (Japan) Kazuki Nakajima	Toyota TS050 Hybrid	LMP1	384	NC	NC
2017	(Japan) Toyota Gazoo Racing	(Switzerland) Sébastien Buemi (Japan) Kazuki Nakajima	Toyota TS050 Hybrid	LMP1	358	8th	**2nd**
2019	(United States) DragonSpeed	(Mexico) Roberto González (Venezuela) Pastor Maldonado	Oreca 07-Gibson	LMP2	245	DNF	DNF
2020	(United Kingdom) Jota Sport	(Mexico) Roberto González (Portugal) António Félix da Costa	Oreca 07-Gibson	LMP2	370	6th	**2nd**
2021	(United Kingdom) Jota	(Mexico) Roberto González (Portugal) António Félix da Costa	Oreca 07-Gibson	LMP2	358	13th	8th

=== Complete FIA World Endurance Championship results ===
Year	Entrant	Class	Chassis	Engine	1	2	3	4	5	6	7	8	9	Rank	Points
2012	Toyota Racing	LMP1	Toyota TS030 Hybrid	Toyota 3.4 L V8 (Hybrid)	SEB	SPA	LMS; Ret	SIL	SÃO	BHR	FUJ	SHA		NC	0
2013	Toyota Racing	LMP1	Toyota TS030 Hybrid	Toyota 3.4 L V8 (Hybrid)	SIL; 3	SPA; 4	LMS; 2	SÃO; Ret	COA; 2	FUJ; 15	SHA; Ret	BHR; 1		3rd	106.25
2014	Toyota Racing	LMP1	Toyota TS040 Hybrid	Toyota 3.7 L V8 (Hybrid)	SIL; 1	SPA; 1	LMS; 3	**COA**; 3	**FUJ**; 1	SHA; 1	BHR; 10	SÃO; 2		1st	166
2015	Toyota Racing	LMP1	Toyota TS040 Hybrid	Toyota 3.7 L V8 (Hybrid)	SIL; 3	SPA; 8	LMS; 8	NÜR; 5	COA; 4	FUJ; 5	SHA; 6	BHR; 4		5th	79
2016	Toyota Gazoo Racing	LMP1	Toyota TS050 Hybrid	Toyota 2.4 L V6 (Hybrid)	SIL; 16	SPA; 27	LMS; NC	NÜR; 5	MEX; WD	COA; 5	FUJ; 4	SHA; 3	BHR; 4	8th	60
2017	Toyota Gazoo Racing	LMP1	Toyota TS050 Hybrid	Toyota 2.4 L V6 (Hybrid)	SIL; 1	SPA; 1	LMS; 6	NÜR; 4	MEX; 3	COA	FUJ; 1	SHA; 1	BHR; 1	3rd	168
2018–19	DragonSpeed	LMP2	Oreca 07	Gibson GK428 4.2 L V8	SPA	LMS	SIL; 4	**FUJ**; 6	SHA; 2	SEB; 3	SPA; 1	LMS; Ret		5th	83
2019–20	Jota Sport	LMP2	Oreca 07	Gibson GK428 4.2 L V8	SIL	FUJ; DSQ	SHA; 1	BHR; 2	COA; 3	SPA; 4	LMS; 2	BHR; 2		4th	142
2021	Jota Sport	LMP2	Oreca 07	Gibson GK428 4.2 L V8	SPA; 2	ALG; 1	MNZ; Ret	**LMS**; 4	BHR; 3	BHR; 2				3rd	123

== Notes ==
Sporting positions
Preceded by Ricardo van der Ende	Formula Ford Festival; Winner; 2000	Succeeded by Alan van der Merwe
Preceded by Jonathan Cochet	FIA European Formula Three Cup / Pau Grand Prix winner 2001	Succeeded by Renaud Derlot
Preceded by Tom Kristensen; Allan McNish; Loïc Duval	FIA World Endurance Champion; 2014; With: Sébastien Buemi	Succeeded by Timo Bernhard; Brendon Hartley; Mark Webber
Awards
Preceded by Gary Paffett	McLaren Autosport BRDC Award; 2000	Succeeded by Steven Kane
