= 2007 Canadian Grand Prix =

Formula One motor race held in 2007

Coordinates: 45°30′00″N 73°31′22″W

Race 6 of 17 in the 2007 Formula One World Championship
| ← Previous race | Next race → |

Race details
- Date: 10 June 2007
- Official name: Formula 1 Grand Prix du Canada 2007
- Location: Circuit Gilles Villeneuve, Montreal, Quebec, Canada
- Course: Street circuit
- Course length: 4.361 km (2.710 miles)
- Distance: 70 laps, 305.270 km (189.686 miles)
- Weather: Warm with temperatures approaching 26 °C (79 °F); wind speeds up to 5.8 kilometres per hour (3.6 mph)

Pole position
| Driver | (United Kingdom) Lewis Hamilton | McLaren-Mercedes |
- Time: 1:15.707

Fastest lap
| Driver | (Spain) Fernando Alonso | McLaren-Mercedes |
- Time: 1:16.367 on lap 46

Podium
| First | (United Kingdom) Lewis Hamilton | McLaren-Mercedes |
| Second | (Germany) Nick Heidfeld | BMW Sauber |
| Third | (Austria) Alexander Wurz | Williams-Toyota |

The 2007 Canadian Grand Prix (formally the Formula 1 Grand Prix du Canada 2007) was a Formula One motor race held on 10 June 2007 at Circuit Gilles Villeneuve in Montreal, Quebec, Canada. It was the sixth race of the 2007 FIA Formula One World Championship.

The race was won by Lewis Hamilton, starting from pole position, in his first season in the top formula. It was Hamilton's first of an eventual record breaking 106 victories in Formula One. Nick Heidfeld finished second and Alexander Wurz was third, making it the first Grand Prix of the 2007 season that drivers from teams other than Ferrari and McLaren achieved podium positions. It was the final podium of Alexander Wurz's career and, as of 2026, the last achieved by an Austrian driver.

The safety car was deployed an unprecedented four times during the course of the race. One of these periods was due to Robert Kubica's crash, which resulted in him suffering a sprained ankle and concussion. During the race Felipe Massa and Giancarlo Fisichella were disqualified for exiting the pit lane when the red light was on. Both were black flagged, and it was the last time a black flag was shown until Nico Hülkenberg at the 2024 São Paulo Grand Prix.

== Report ==
=== Background ===
A test session was held on May 17 and 18 at the Circuit Paul Ricard in France, with the track configured to replicate the characteristics of the Circuit Gilles Villeneuve for the final two days after it had been in the style of the Monaco for the first two. Despite the fact that the McLaren team had dominated on the Monaco set up of the circuit, Ferrari were better on the Canadian set up.

Kimi Räikkönen had the fastest time on the first day, with a time of 1:28.833. Rain after lunch caused the test to be halted, when the test resumed Räikkönen was forced to finish early when his car experienced electronic problems. Scott Speed achieved the second fastest time, two tenths of a second behind Räikkönen, with seven tenths separating the first eight drivers. The Red Bull team focused on testing their suspension. Rubens Barrichello and Christian Klien shared testing for the Honda team over the day, however Klien's engine failed on his first lap. James Rossiter in the Super Aguri completed the most laps with 115.

Räikkönen was also the fastest on the second day with a time of 1:28.624, with Renault driver Giancarlo Fisichella ending the day with the second fastest time. Fisichella also completed 111 laps, the second most of the day, behind James Rossiter's 131. Pedro de la Rosa was third fastest despite completing fewer laps than other drivers due to his engine failing early in the day. The testing session was stopped twice, when Adrian Sutil's and Jenson Button's engines failed. Red Bull continued to perform high and low downforce work and BMW performed low and medium downforce work. Fisichella was optimistic about the race after these tests saying "he had more grip, the brakes were good and the front suspension gave him a better turn-in".

During the two weeks leading up to the Grand Prix, Räikkönen and Felipe Massa released statements to the press saying they believed that everything would be different in Canada because of the very different conditions—as shown at Paul Ricard. Fernando Alonso believed McLaren had momentum from their win in Monaco, and Martin Whitmarsh said that they were realistic about dominating the race.

=== Practice ===
The race was preceded by three practice sessions. Practice started on the Friday with Alonso leading at the end of both practice sessions. In both sessions, he outpaced his teammate and the closest Ferrari driven by Felipe Massa. BMW Sauber were pleased with 5th place in the first session and 7th in the second from Nick Heidfeld despite his report that the car was "very difficult to drive". Robert Kubica's car suffered a fuel leak resulting in him being unable to post a timed lap in the morning session. Kubica also told the press after the fuel leak, "the car has been quite difficult to drive." Both Red Bull drivers finished in the top ten of the morning practice. Honda was slower than its customer team Super Aguri in the first practice, but Barrichello was faster than Takuma Sato in the second practice. Toyota's suspension problems meant that their second practice was cut short, but not before Ralf Schumacher narrowly missed a groundhog that ran across the track. After experiencing problems with Jarno Trulli's suspension, Toyota stopped both drivers for 45 minutes as a precautionary measure. By the time they got the cars back on the track, they only managed a few extra laps until the problem recurred. Heikki Kovalainen ended his practice day by going into the wall at turn seven, damaging the suspension. His teammate, Fisichella, performed better, staying in the top 8 in both sessions. At the end of the afternoon practice, Mark Webber slowed down unexpectedly before turn eight causing Scott Speed to drive into the back of the Red Bull. Webber had overtaken Speed just before this incident.

The Saturday morning practice session was 17 minutes shorter than the scheduled 60 minutes, due to Kovalainen's Renault having a suspected engine failure. The failure caused oil to be split on the track, this failure persisted during the race weekend. This resulted in a red flag period, from 10:33 am until 10:50 am local time. Hamilton led the practice with the fastest lap; with Räikkönen, Alonso and Massa posting the second, third and fourth fastest laps respectively. Sato finished the session with the fifth fastest lap in the Super Aguri car, outpacing the Honda works team for the second time during the race weekend. Toyota continued a disappointing race weekend, with the 14th and 16th fastest laps. Their suspension problems from the day before had not been resolved, and the two drivers were given instructions to avoid the kerbs at turn eight to minimise further damage to the suspension. Red Bull came back with both of the two repaired cars entering the top ten.

=== Qualifying ===
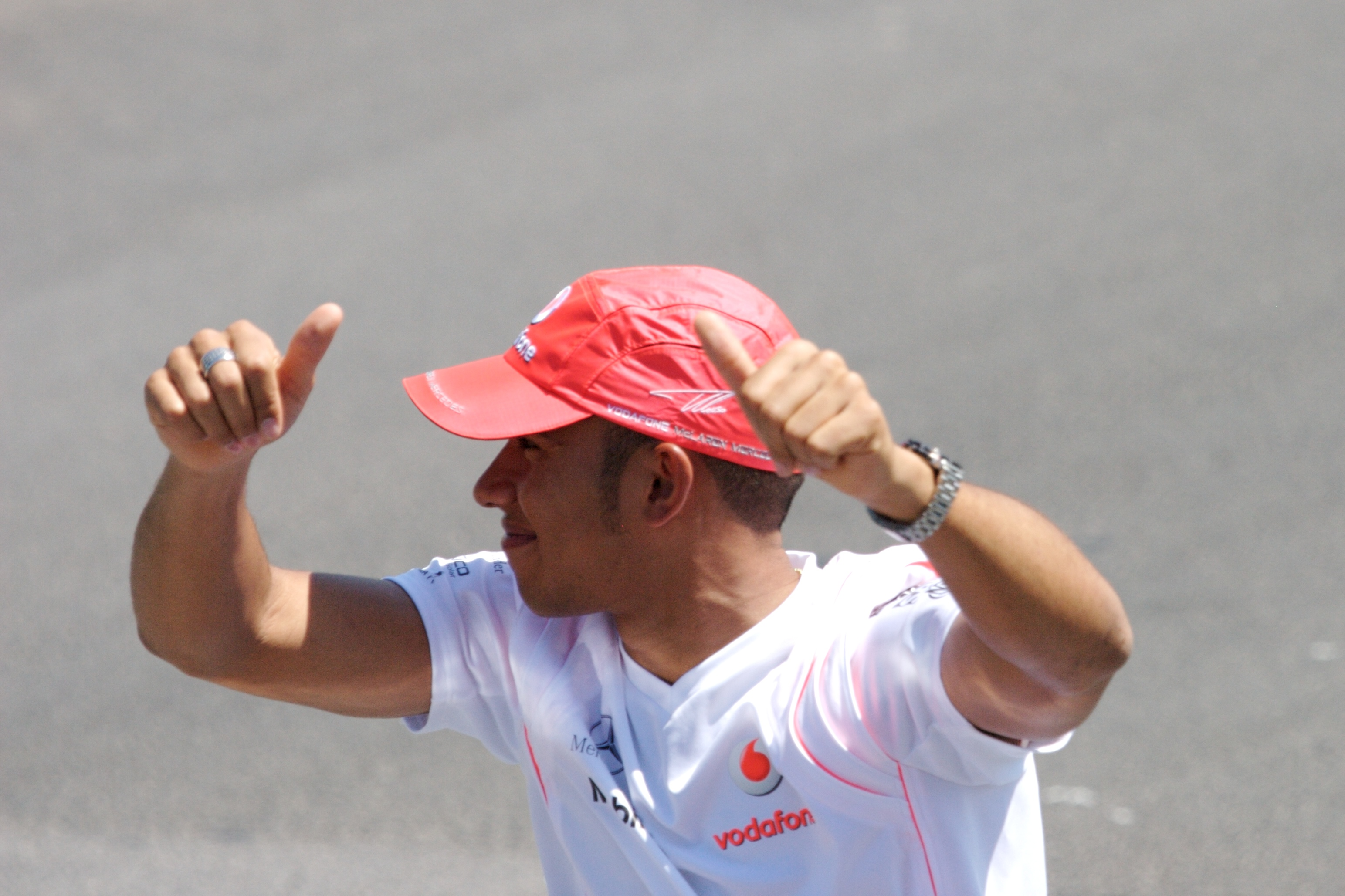
Lewis Hamilton took the first pole position of his career at this Grand Prix

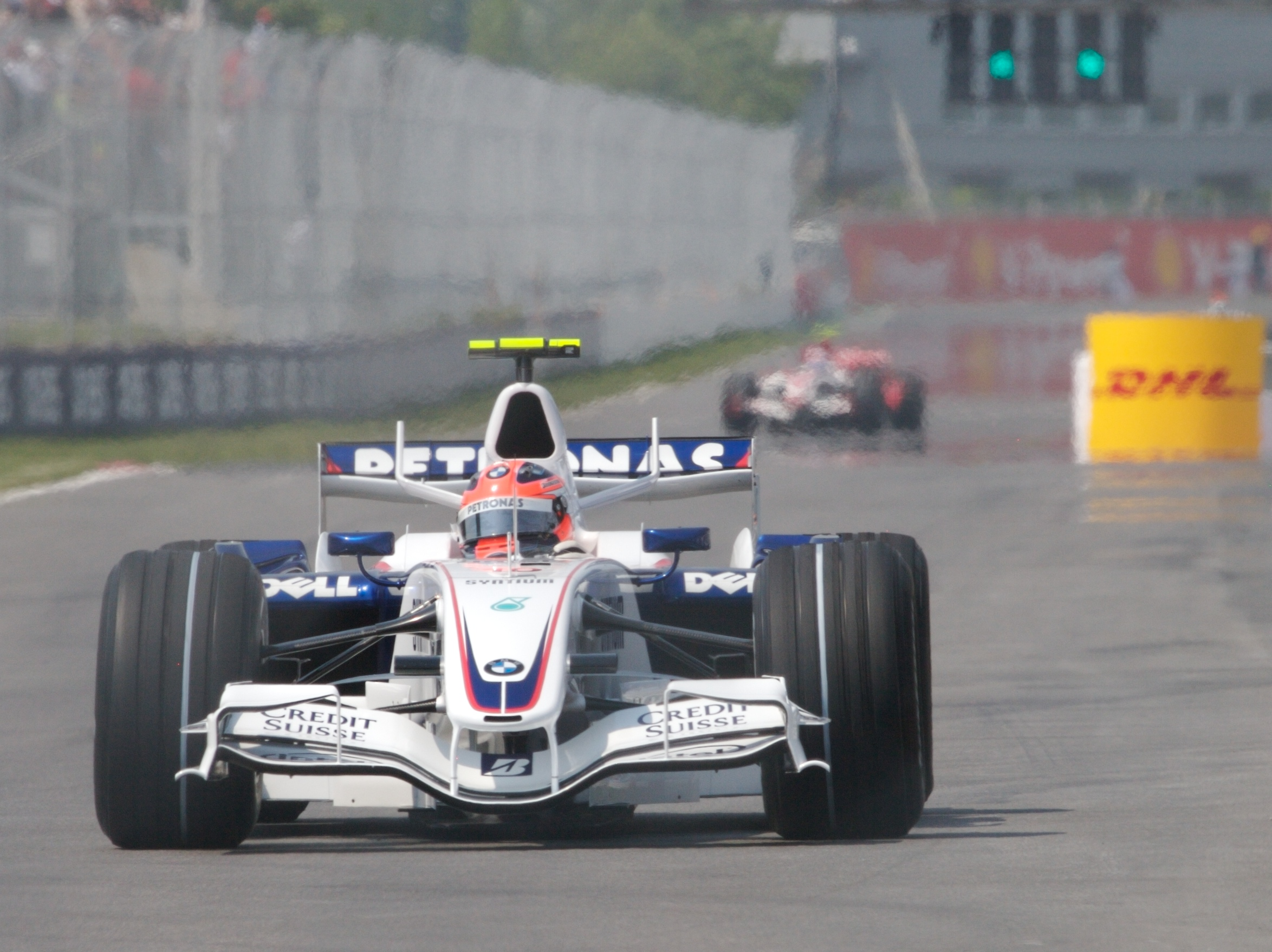
Robert Kubica leaves the pits during qualifying

The qualifying session to determine the starting order for the race was held in three parts, six cars ware eliminated after each of the first two parts. Hamilton took his first pole position as part of a McLaren one-two. Heidfeld improved on his practice performance to take third position, in front of the Ferraris of Räikkönen and Massa. Massa shared the third row with Mark Webber, who did not seem to be suffering the same braking problem that almost put teammate David Coulthard out in the first session of qualifying. Coulthard had only one attempt at a lap in the second session as a result. Nico Rosberg, Robert Kubica, Giancarlo Fisichella and Jarno Trulli completed the top ten.

Consistent with previous form, the Hondas of Barrichello and Button failed to make it into the top ten; they qualified 13th and 15th respectively. Takuma Sato once again outqualified the two Honda cars, just missing out on the top ten, in front of Vitantonio Liuzzi. He made it through to the second session of qualifying by 94 hundredths of a second, where he qualified in 14th. Scott Speed was the slowest car in the second session of qualifying putting him in 16th position.

Anthony Davidson missed out on the second session of qualifying, putting his Super Aguri in 17th position, 3 places behind his teammate Sato. Ralf Schumacher and his team were disappointed with qualifying in 18th. Heikki Kovalainen crashed into the wall at turn five, damaging his rear suspension and losing his rear wing, resulting in the session being stopped temporarily. Once the debris had been cleared, Kovalainen in his repaired car managed one impressive lap that put him in 13th, after which six drivers outqualified him. Kovalainen then had to make an engine change due to an engine failure and was demoted to the back of the grid. Wurz, Sutil and Albers qualified in 19th, 20th and 21st respectively after being pushed up a place by Kovalainen's engine change.

=== Race ===
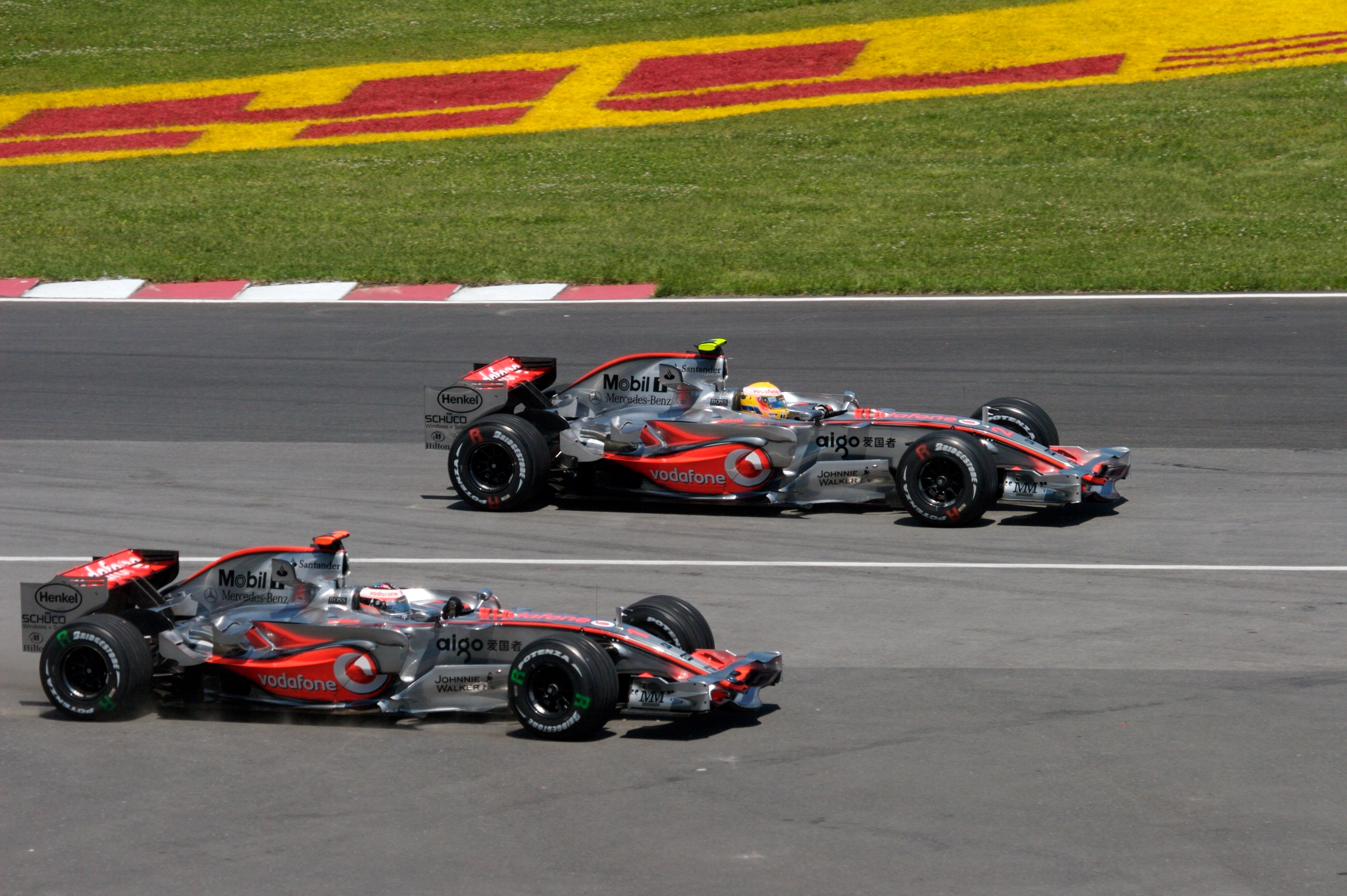
Lewis Hamilton leads at the start of the race, whilst Fernando Alonso runs wide at the first corner.

Robert Kubica's violent crash.

Lewis Hamilton led from the start, preventing Fernando Alonso from overtaking at turn one. Alonso ran wide allowing Nick Heidfeld to overtake him and move into second place. Alonso damaged his car in the process and subsequently ran off the track at turn one a further three times during the race. Jenson Button had a gearbox problem at the start of the race and was unable to select first gear causing him stall on the grid. Christijan Albers started from the pit lane. The first accident of the race involved Scott Speed who clipped the rear wing of Wurz' Williams and went into the hairpin with a broken front-right suspension.

Alonso ran across the grass at turn one again on lap 15, which resulted in him falling further behind Hamilton. Three laps later he made a similar mistake at the same turn, resulting in him sliding across the grass for the third time in the race. This caused him to drop back to fourth as it allowed Massa to go round the inside of Alonso into third. Massa moved into second when Heidfeld made a pit stop on lap 20. Hamilton made a pit stop on lap 22, rejoining the race in third place.

On lap 22 Adrian Sutil crashed at turn four and the safety car had to be deployed; Hamilton had made a pit stop just before the incident. Thus the pit lane was closed but Fernando Alonso and Nico Rosberg were forced to pit in order to avoid running out of fuel, and were given ten-second stop-and-go penalties. When the pit lane was re-opened and the rest of the field made pit stops, Massa and Giancarlo Fisichella left the pit lane while the red light was still on. Both were later disqualified from the race on lap 51.

Circuit Gilles Villeneuve showing the location of Sutil's (red) and Kubica's (blue) crashes.

The race was restarted on lap 26, and on the approach to the hairpin later in the lap Robert Kubica hit the back of Jarno Trulli's Toyota. The impact forced Kubica onto the grass at the edge of the track, where a bump launched his car into and along the concrete wall just before the hairpin. After losing three wheels, the nose and suffering major damage to the sidepods in the initial impact, the BMW flipped back across the track and came to rest against the barrier in the run-off area on the other side of the track. Although initial reports said that he had broken his leg, Kubica only suffered a sprained ankle and concussion. The safety car was deployed again after this crash. The safety car was also deployed on lap 50, due to debris from a crash involving Christijan Albers on the previous lap, and on lap 55 due to Vitantonio Liuzzi crashing into the wall of champions once again. On Lap 58, Jarno Trulli was trying to pass Wurz, but his front track rod clipped away causing him to crash. Cement was placed at the hairpin around Kubica's accident. Räikkönen ran wide after he misjudged the braking on the dust. The Super Aguri of Takuma Sato went past him as a result and moved into 10th place. On lap 37, Trulli and Nico Rosberg were battling for position going into turn one. Both span off the track in almost synchronized fashion without touching each other but were able to keep going. This occurrence amused reporters due to it resembling a form of dance. Anthony Davidson also made an unscheduled pit stop, claiming after the race that a beaver had damaged his front wing although Canadian reports said it more likely to have been a groundhog. One lap later David Coulthard was forced to retire due to a gearbox problem. Ralf Schumacher also stopped on this lap and this allowed Massa, Fisichella and Sato to move ahead of both of them. Räikkönen had his second pit stop on lap 52 at the same time as Alonso. The latter was able to pass him just after they had exited the pits side by side. This moved him into 5th.

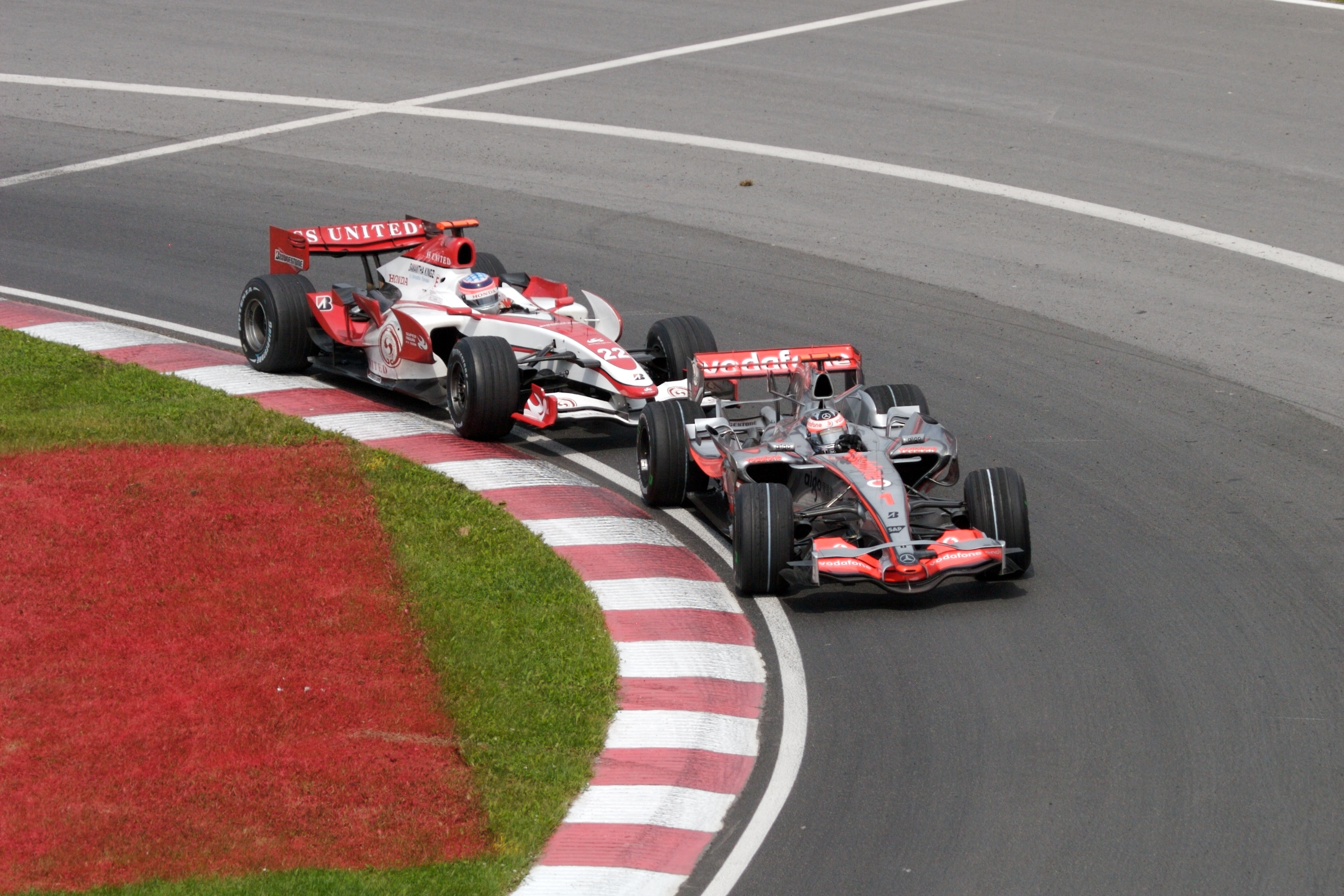
In the closing stages, Takuma Sato passed Alonso to take sixth position: the best result in the Super Aguri team's history.

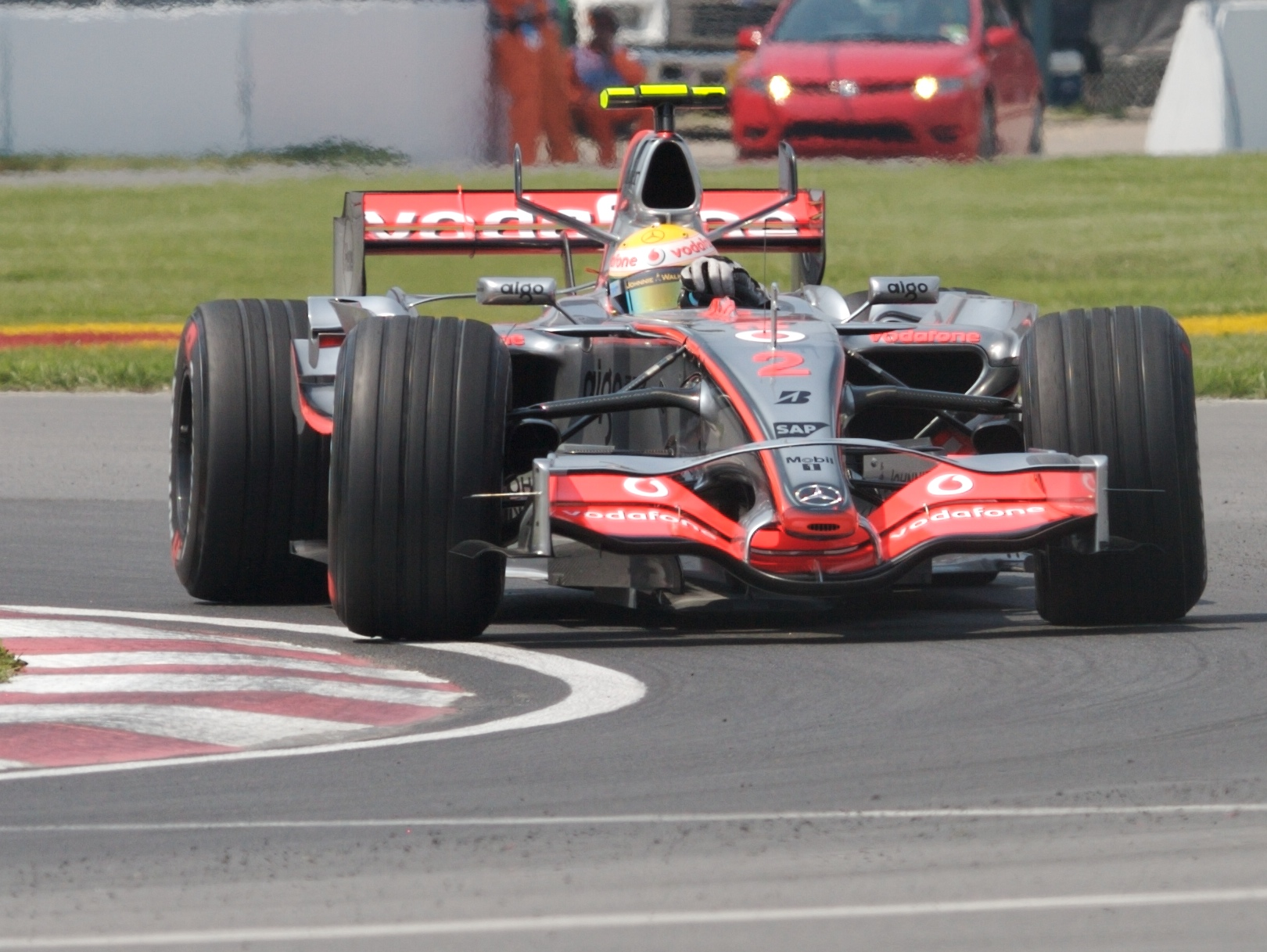
Hamilton led from pole position to take the first victory of his F1 career.

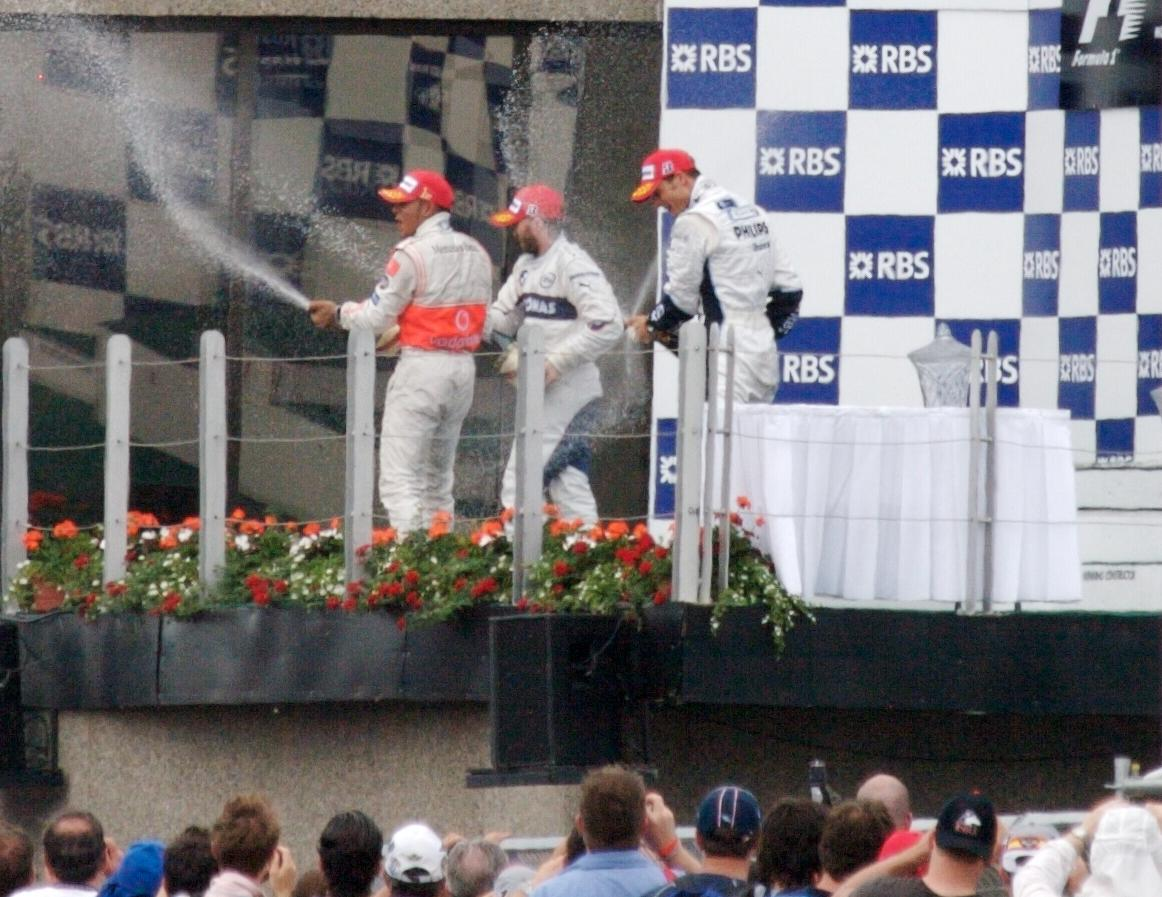
The podium celebrations.

Including the two disqualifications, ten drivers failed to finish the race, six of them because of accidents including Kubica. Four of them gearbox failures. Several cars were damaged during the race: Wurz's rear wing was damaged in the incident that took out Speed, while Davidson hit a groundhog on the racetrack. This meant that the safety car had to be deployed on four occasions. At the final restart on lap sixty, all of the remaining twelve cars were on the same lap creating some close racing and a lot of overtaking. Hamilton sustained his consistent pace throughout all of the incidents and pulled clear of Heidfeld in the closing stages, taking his first race win relatively comfortably. Barrichello dropped ten places on his final pit stop. Hamilton's championship lead was strengthened when Sato overtook the reigning world champion to move into sixth place around the outside of the final chicane, having switched to the harder tyres on his final stop.

Austria's Alexander Wurz drove through the field in his Williams from 19th at the start to finish third by taking one pitstop, completing 40 laps on super soft tires. By finishing third, Wurz recorded his third and final career podium in the race that marked ten years since his debut race in F1. His podium remains the last scored by an Austrian driver. This was the first podium finish for Williams since the 2005 European Grand Prix, with Nick Heidfeld in second place after trailing Hamilton for the majority of the race. The safety car deployments also allowed Heikki Kovalainen to move up to fourth after starting at the back of the grid. The race was the first time in the 2007 season where a driver from a team other than Ferrari or McLaren made the podium.

Sato overtook the McLaren-Mercedes of world champion Fernando Alonso around the outside at the final corner on lap 68, just after overtaking Ralf Schumacher and having overtaken Ferrari's Kimi Räikkönen earlier in the race. He finished sixth after having a race that had seen him move from the middle of the grid; to the back of the pack and to a high of fifth before a pit-stop error caused him to move back to eleventh; were moved up 5 places in the last 15 laps. This was the last time that Super Aguri scored Formula One points, and its biggest single points haul. The team's only other point came at the 2007 Spanish Grand Prix.

=== Post-race ===
Reaction to the race was mainly focused on Hamilton and the fact that it was his first Grand Prix victory, making him the first black driver to ever win a Formula One race. It was also thought impressive that it had taken only six races for him to win and, in the process, take the lead in the drivers' championship at the age of 22. Three-time world champion Niki Lauda said he was "stunned" by the victory and former world champion Damon Hill believed "People should not underestimate what he had achieved in a short space of time". Speculation began about the possibility of him winning the drivers championship.

Alonso and the Ferrari team were disappointed with the outcome of the race. Alonso was now eight points behind Hamilton in the drivers championship, as a result of finishing 7th. Ferrari lost ground in both the constructors and driver championship, after gaining a total of just four points from the race. Alonso believed Hamilton to have been "very lucky" to have won the race and did not congratulate his teammate after the race. Hamilton's performance was felt to have been faultless and all the more impressive due to four separate deployments of the Safety Car.

As a result of his crash Kubica was unable to race at the next Grand Prix in the United States. The decision to not allow him to race was made by the sport's governing body the Fédération Internationale de l'Automobile (FIA), as they believed it was a too much of a risk for him to race in case of another crash so soon after this one, despite Kubica stating that he was "ready to race". He was replaced by Sebastian Vettel for the next Grand Prix.

== Classification ==
=== Qualifying ===
| Pos. | No. | Driver | Constructor | Q1 | Q2 | Q3 | Grid |
|---|---|---|---|---|---|---|---|
| 1 | 2 | (United Kingdom) Lewis Hamilton | McLaren-Mercedes | 1:16.576 | 1:15.486 | 1:15.707 | 1 |
| 2 | 1 | (Spain) Fernando Alonso | McLaren-Mercedes | 1:16.562 | 1:15.522 | 1:16.163 | 2 |
| 3 | 9 | (Germany) Nick Heidfeld | BMW Sauber | 1:17.006 | 1:15.960 | 1:16.266 | 3 |
| 4 | 6 | (Finland) Kimi Räikkönen | Ferrari | 1:16.468 | 1:16.592 | 1:16.411 | 4 |
| 5 | 5 | (Brazil) Felipe Massa | Ferrari | 1:16.756 | 1:16.138 | 1:16.570 | 5 |
| 6 | 15 | (Australia) Mark Webber | Red Bull-Renault | 1:17.315 | 1:16.257 | 1:16.913 | 6 |
| 7 | 16 | (Germany) Nico Rosberg | Williams-Toyota | 1:17.016 | 1:16.190 | 1:16.919 | 7 |
| 8 | 10 | (Poland) Robert Kubica | BMW Sauber | 1:17.267 | 1:16.368 | 1:16.993 | 8 |
| 9 | 3 | (Italy) Giancarlo Fisichella | Renault | 1:16.805 | 1:16.288 | 1:17.229 | 9 |
| 10 | 12 | (Italy) Jarno Trulli | Toyota | 1:17.324 | 1:16.600 | 1:17.747 | 10 |
| 11 | 22 | (Japan) Takuma Sato | Super Aguri-Honda | 1:17.490 | 1:16.743 | | 11 |
| 12 | 18 | (Italy) Vitantonio Liuzzi | Toro Rosso-Ferrari | 1:17.541 | 1:16.760 | | 12 |
| 13 | 8 | (Brazil) Rubens Barrichello | Honda | 1:17.011 | 1:17.116 | | 13 |
| 14 | 14 | (United Kingdom) David Coulthard | Red Bull-Renault | 1:17.436 | 1:17.304 | | 14 |
| 15 | 7 | (United Kingdom) Jenson Button | Honda | 1:17.522 | 1:17.541 | | 15 |
| 16 | 19 | (United States) Scott Speed | Toro Rosso-Ferrari | 1:17.433 | 1:17.571 | | 16 |
| 17 | 23 | (United Kingdom) Anthony Davidson | Super Aguri-Honda | 1:17.542 | | | 17 |
| 18 | 11 | (Germany) Ralf Schumacher | Toyota | 1:17.634 | | | 18 |
| 19 | 4 | (Finland) Heikki Kovalainen | Renault | 1:17.806 | | | 22^{1} |
| 20 | 17 | (Austria) Alexander Wurz | Williams-Toyota | 1:18.089 | | | 19 |
| 21 | 20 | (Germany) Adrian Sutil | Spyker-Ferrari | 1:18.536 | | | 20 |
| 22 | 21 | (Netherlands) Christijan Albers | Spyker-Ferrari | 1:19.196 | | | 21 |

Notes

- ^1 – Heikki Kovalainen was given a ten-place grid penalty after he made an unscheduled engine change. This was due to an engine failure during the Saturday practice session (P3).

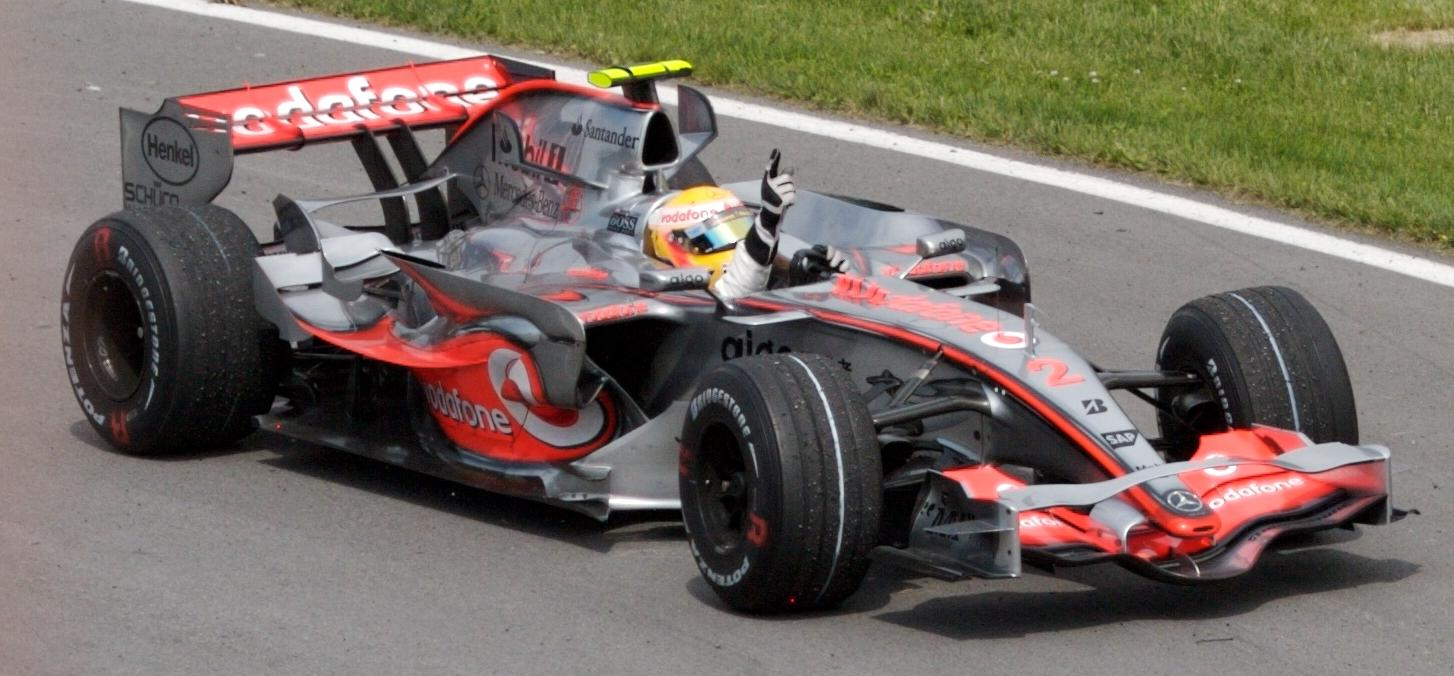
Hamilton celebrates his win on his victory lap.

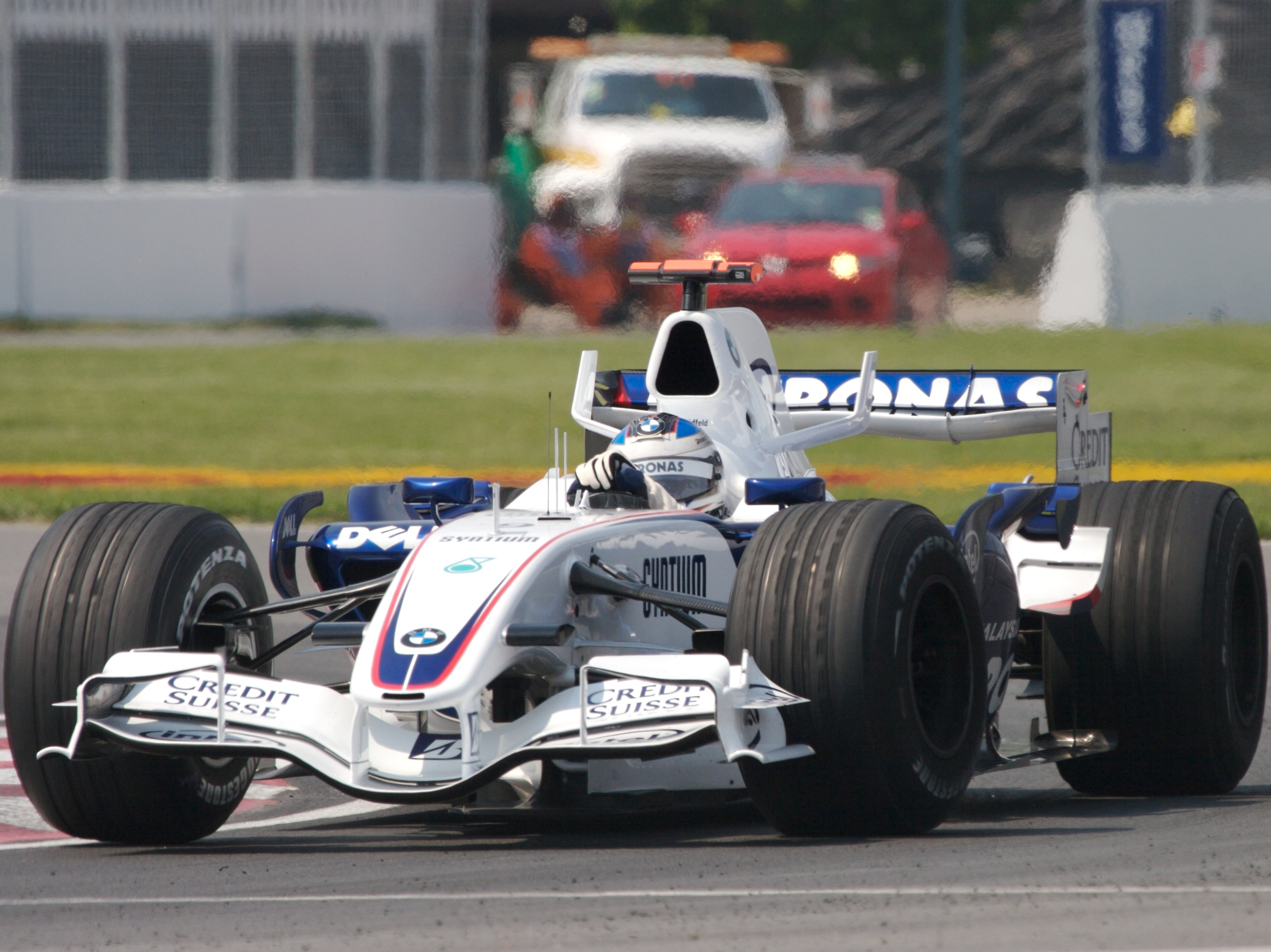
Nick Heidfeld scored his best result of 2007 with a second-place finish.

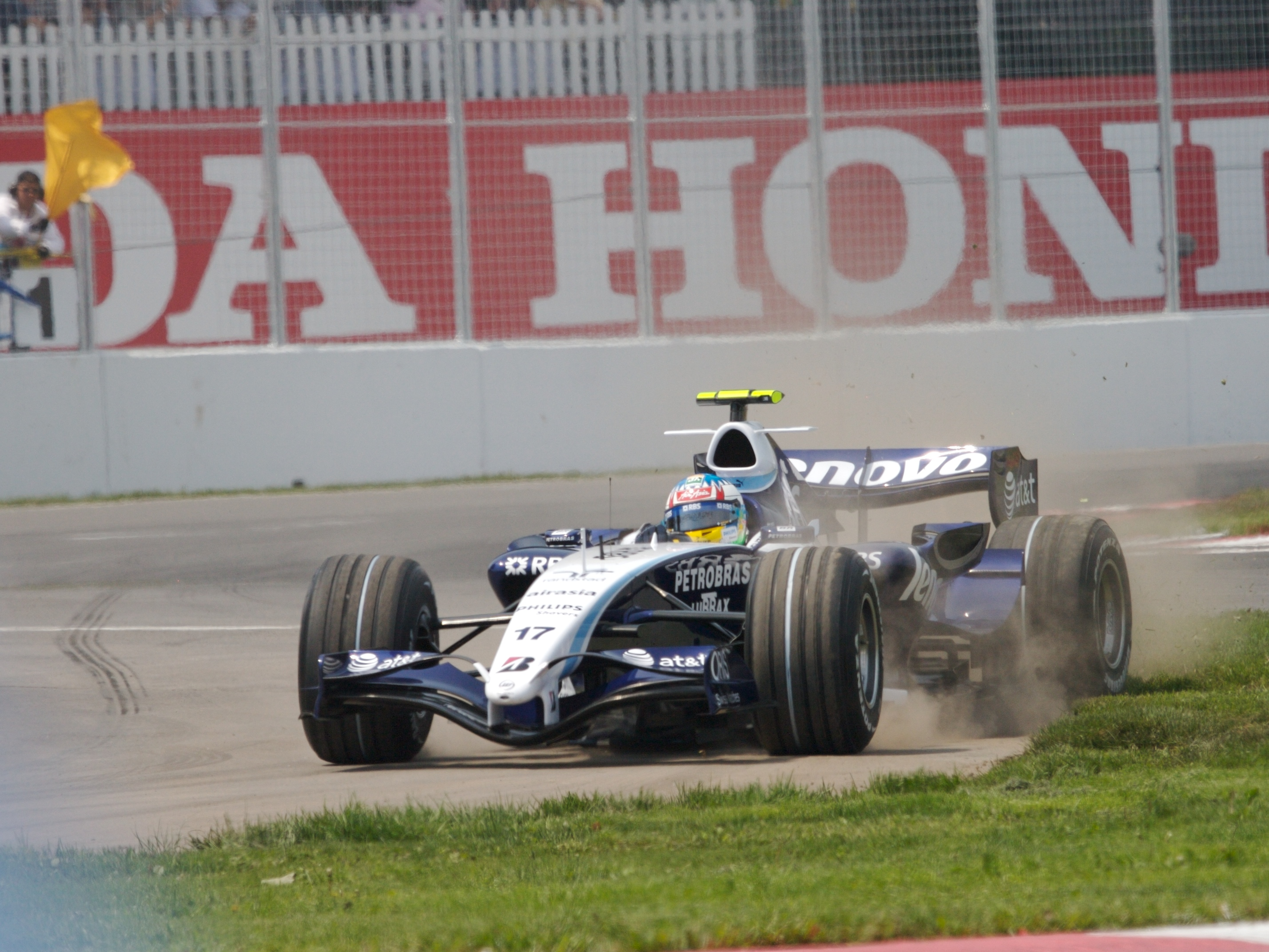
Alexander Wurz took the final podium position, ten years after his first F1 race.

=== Race ===
| Pos. | No. | Driver | Constructor | Laps | Time/Retired | Grid | Points |
|---|---|---|---|---|---|---|---|
| 1 | 2 | (United Kingdom) Lewis Hamilton | McLaren-Mercedes | 70 | 1:44:11.292 | 1 | 10 |
| 2 | 9 | (Germany) Nick Heidfeld | BMW Sauber | 70 | +4.343 | 3 | 8 |
| 3 | 17 | (Austria) Alexander Wurz | Williams-Toyota | 70 | +5.325 | 19 | 6 |
| 4 | 4 | (Finland) Heikki Kovalainen | Renault | 70 | +6.729 | 22 | 5 |
| 5 | 6 | (Finland) Kimi Räikkönen | Ferrari | 70 | +13.007 | 4 | 4 |
| 6 | 22 | (Japan) Takuma Sato | Super Aguri-Honda | 70 | +16.698 | 11 | 3 |
| 7 | 1 | (Spain) Fernando Alonso | McLaren-Mercedes | 70 | +21.936 | 2 | 2 |
| 8 | 11 | (Germany) Ralf Schumacher | Toyota | 70 | +22.888 | 18 | 1 |
| 9 | 15 | (Australia) Mark Webber | Red Bull-Renault | 70 | +22.960 | 6 | |
| 10 | 16 | (Germany) Nico Rosberg | Williams-Toyota | 70 | +23.984 | 7 | |
| 11 | 23 | (United Kingdom) Anthony Davidson | Super Aguri-Honda | 70 | +24.318 | 17 | |
| 12 | 8 | (Brazil) Rubens Barrichello | Honda | 70 | +30.439 | 13 | |
| Ret | 12 | (Italy) Jarno Trulli | Toyota | 58 | Accident | 10 | |
| Ret | 18 | (Italy) Vitantonio Liuzzi | Toro Rosso-Ferrari | 54 | Accident | 12 | |
| Ret | 21 | (Netherlands) Christijan Albers | Spyker-Ferrari | 47 | Collision damage | PL^{2} | |
| Ret | 14 | (United Kingdom) David Coulthard | Red Bull-Renault | 36 | Gearbox | 14 | |
| Ret | 10 | (Poland) Robert Kubica | BMW Sauber | 26 | Accident | 8 | |
| Ret | 20 | (Germany) Adrian Sutil | Spyker-Ferrari | 21 | Accident | 20 | |
| Ret | 19 | (United States) Scott Speed | Toro Rosso-Ferrari | 8 | Collision | 16 | |
| Ret | 7 | (United Kingdom) Jenson Button | Honda | 0 | Gearbox | 15 | |
| DSQ | 5 | (Brazil) Felipe Massa | Ferrari | 51 | Exited pits under red light^{3} | 5 | |
| DSQ | 3 | (Italy) Giancarlo Fisichella | Renault | 51 | Exited pits under red light^{3} | 9 | |

Notes

- ^2 – Christijan Albers began from the pit lane.
- ^3 – Felipe Massa and Giancarlo Fisichella were disqualified for exiting the pit lane when the red light was on.

== Championship standings after the race ==
Drivers' Championship standings

| +/– | Pos. | Driver | Points |
|---|---|---|---|
| 1 | 1 | (United Kingdom) Lewis Hamilton | 48 |
| 1 | 2 | (Spain) Fernando Alonso | 40 |
| | 3 | (Brazil) Felipe Massa | 33 |
| | 4 | (Finland) Kimi Räikkönen | 27 |
| | 5 | (Germany) Nick Heidfeld | 26 |

Constructors' Championship standings

| +/– | Pos. | Constructor | Points |
|---|---|---|---|
| | 1 | (United Kingdom) McLaren-Mercedes | 88 |
| | 2 | (Italy) Ferrari | 60 |
| | 3 | (Germany) BMW Sauber | 38 |
| | 4 | (France) Renault | 21 |
| | 5 | (United Kingdom) Williams-Toyota | 13 |

- Note: Only the top five positions are included for both sets of standings.

| Previous race: 2007 Monaco Grand Prix | FIA Formula One World Championship; 2007 season | Next race: 2007 United States Grand Prix |
| Previous race: 2006 Canadian Grand Prix | Canadian Grand Prix | Next race: 2008 Canadian Grand Prix |
