= Takuma Sato =

Japanese racing driver (born 1977)

- 佐藤 琢磨
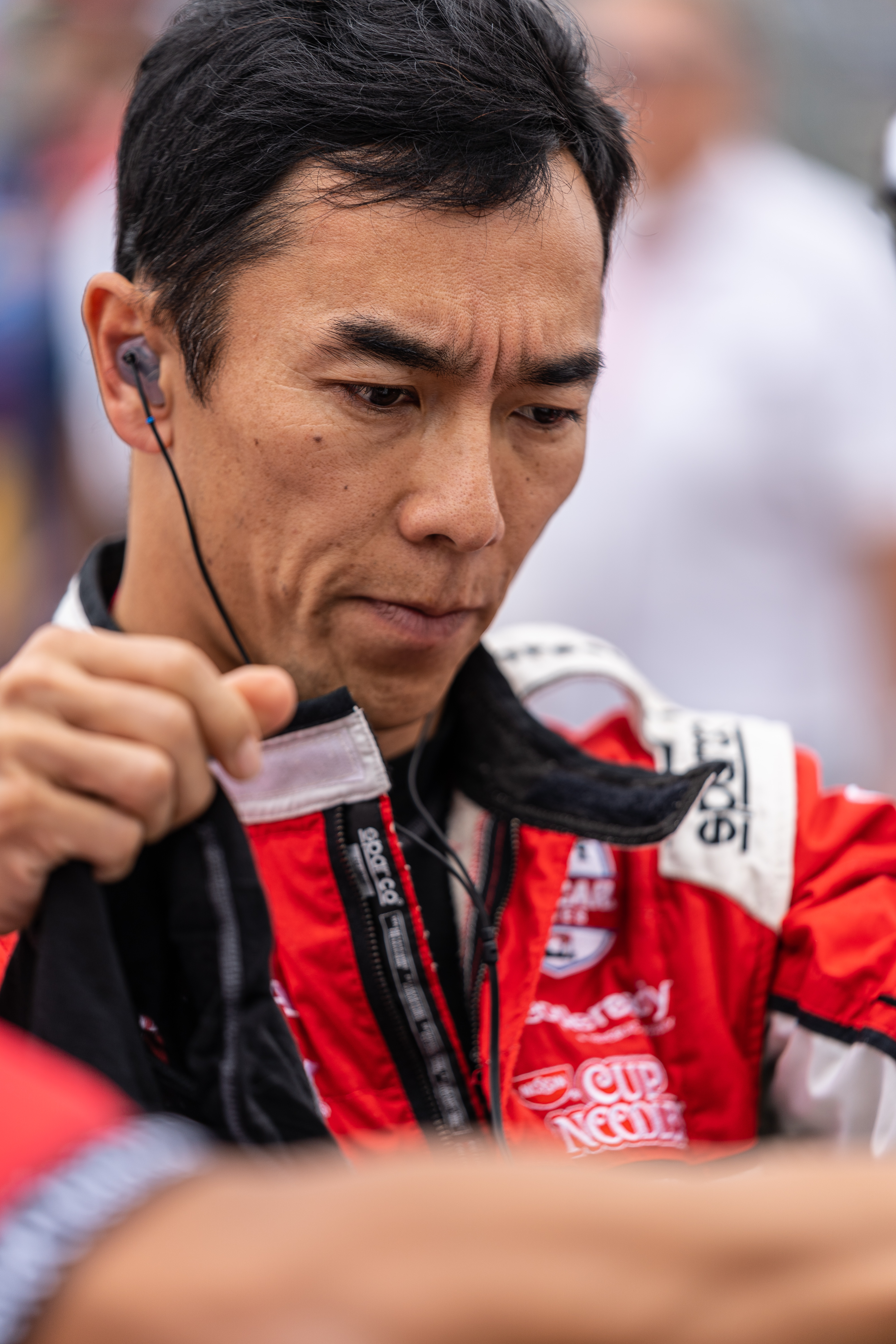
- Sato at the 2021 Grand Prix of Long Beach
- Born: 28 January 1977 (age 49); Shinjuku, Tokyo, Japan
- Spouse: Chiharu (m. 2005)
- Children: 2, including Rintaro

IndyCar Series career
- 221 races run over 15 years
- Team: No. 75 (Rahal Letterman Lanigan Racing)
- Best finish: 7th (2020)
- First race: 2010 São Paulo Indy 300
- Last race: 2025 Indianapolis 500
- First win: 2013 Toyota Grand Prix of Long Beach
- Last win: 2020 Indianapolis 500
Wins	Podiums	Poles
6	14	10

Formula One World Championship career
- Nationality: (Japan) Japanese
- Active years: 2002–2008
- Team(s): Jordan, BAR, Super Aguri
- Entries: 92 (90 starts)
- Championships: 0
- Wins: 0
- Podiums: 1
- Career points: 44
- Pole positions: 0
- Fastest laps: 0
- First entry: 2002 Australian Grand Prix
- Last entry: 2008 Spanish Grand Prix

Championship titles
- 2017, 2020 2001 2001 2001: Indianapolis 500; Macau Grand Prix; Masters of Formula 3 British Formula Three

Awards
- 2001: Autosport National Racing Driver of the Year

Takuma "Taku" Sato (Japanese: 佐藤 琢磨, Hepburn: Satō Takuma; born 28 January 1977) is a Japanese racing driver, who competes part-time in the IndyCar Series for Rahal Letterman Lanigan Racing. He competed in Formula One from 2002 to 2008. In American open-wheel racing, Sato is a two-time winner of the Indianapolis 500 winning in 2017 and 2020, and remains the only Asian driver to win the event.

Born and raised in Tokyo, Sato began his career in karting before moving to Europe in 1999 with support from Honda. Progressing directly to Formula Three, Sato finished third in the British Championship in 2000 and dominated the series in 2001 with Carlin. With Carlin he also won the Macau Grand Prix and the Masters of Formula 3.

Sato signed for Jordan in 2002, making his Formula One debut at the Australian Grand Prix, under Honda power. He moved with Honda to join BAR in 2003 as a reserve driver, replacing Jacques Villeneuve at his home Grand Prix in Japan and returning as a full-time driver in 2004. Sato achieved a podium at the United States Grand Prix as he finished a career-best eighth in the World Drivers' Championship.

Following struggles at BAR in 2005, Sato moved to Super Aguri for his 2006 campaign onwards. Amidst financial troubles, Super Aguri withdrew from the sport after the 2008 Spanish Grand Prix, ending both Sato and teammate Anthony Davidson's driving careers in Formula One.

After a year's hiatus, Sato returned to open-wheel racing in the IndyCar Series with KV in 2010. He took his maiden pole position at the Iowa Corn Indy 250 in 2011, and became the first Asian driver to win an IndyCar race at the Grand Prix of Long Beach in 2013 with Foyt.

His one-off entry in Formula E at the 2014 Beijing ePrix marked the first—and to this date, only—time that Sato competed without a Honda power unit in his professional career, using a spec McLaren powertrain.

Sato signed for Andretti in 2017, winning the Indianapolis 500 for the first time. He won several other times across his 2018 and 2019 seasons with RLL, before again winning at Indianapolis in 2020. Sato competed for Dale Coyne Racing in 2022, before moving in 2023 into part-time roles.

Sato is a widely popular figure amongst fans and media worldwide, renowned for his aggressive driving style and motto No Attack, No Chance.

== Early career ==
Born in Tokyo, Sato began karting in Japan at the age of nineteen. After winning the national karting title in 1997, he moved to Europe with backing from Honda. He briefly raced in Vauxhall Junior and Formula Opel, before debuting in Class B of the British Formula 3 Championship mid-way through 1999 British Formula Three Championship with class wins at the British Grand Prix and Spa for Diamond Racing. He moved to the top class of the championship with Carlin Motorsport in 2000, taking four wins and third place in the championship. In 2001, he won twelve out of 26 races to take a dominant championship win, the first for a Japanese driver in the series. In 2001, he also won the prestigious Macau Grand Prix and Masters of Formula 3 non-championship F3 races.

== Formula One career ==
=== Jordan (2002) ===
In 2002, Sato graduated to Formula One with the Honda-powered Jordan team, and was paired with Giancarlo Fisichella. His low point was a tremendous crash in Austria, caused when Nick Heidfeld lost control of his Sauber under braking and hit the side of Sato's car, punching a hole in the side of the cockpit. Throughout he showed flashes of speed but also wild driving, eventually scoring fifth place at his home Grand Prix in Suzuka.

=== BAR (2003–2005) ===
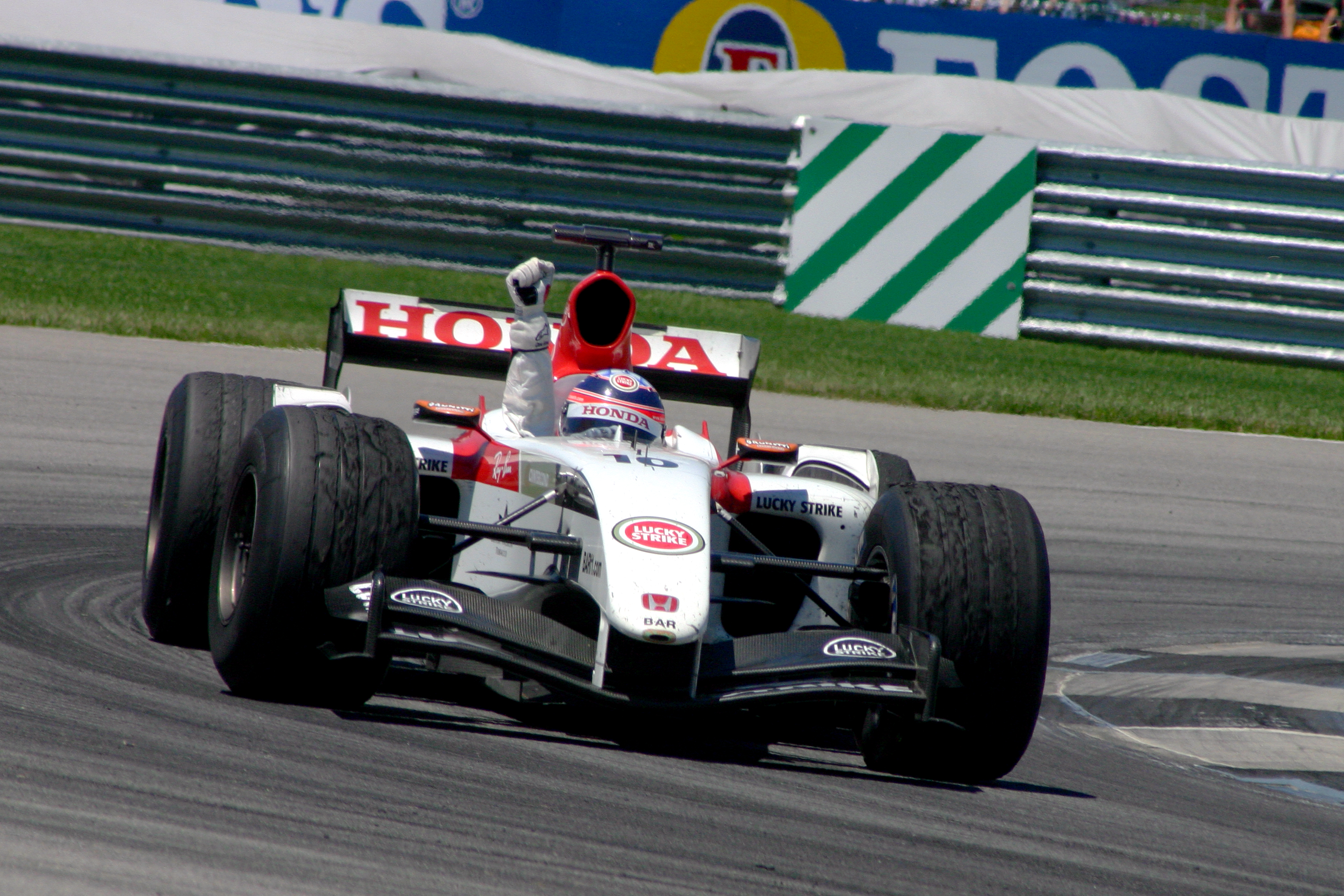
Sato celebrates his only Formula One podium finish, at the 2004 United States Grand Prix.

With Honda's focus shifting solely to British American Racing for 2003, Sato joined the Brackley-based outfit as a test driver. However before his late-season racing return to the sport, Sato was overshadowed by the death of Daijiro Kato who was killed during 2003 Japanese Grand Prix MotoGP race. Kato was Sato's closest friend in the Honda camp and Sato led his tribute to his friend during the 2003 San Marino Grand Prix weekend. For the final round in Japan, Sato replaced Jacques Villeneuve and scored the second points finish of his career with sixth place, after a battle with Michael Schumacher. He was signed to race full-time in 2004. During the 2004 season, Sato qualified four times in the top-three, including a front row start and an overall lap record at the European Grand Prix. Sato's aggressive driving style paid dividends at the United States Grand Prix, where, after the team did not pit under safety car conditions, Sato fought back with some daring overtaking moves to score his first podium finish and the first for a Japanese driver since Aguri Suzuki at the 1990 Japanese Grand Prix. Reliability issues caused him to retire six times, but he scored points in nine of the eleven races he completed to finish eighth in the championship with 34 points, the best-ever result for a Japanese and Asian driver in Formula One. His efforts helped BAR-Honda to finish second in the Constructors' Championship.

Sato was retained by BAR-Honda for the 2005 season, but the 2005 car was not as close to the front of the pack as the previous year's design. Sato missed the Malaysian Grand Prix with illness, and both drivers were disqualified from the San Marino Grand Prix and the entire team banned from the two subsequent races for using cars that were underweight when all fuel was removed. The Court did not find that this was deliberate. Sato's season never recovered from that point, and he ended the season with eighth place at the Hungarian Grand Prix as his only points finish, despite qualifying seven times in the top-ten. Sato was not re-signed for 2006, despite Honda taking full control of the team.

=== Super Aguri (2006–2008) ===
Sato joined the new Super Aguri F1 team for 2006, run by Japanese former driver Aguri Suzuki. The new outfit was in effect a Honda B-team but ran the first half of the season with a modified version of a 2002 Arrows A23 chassis. Nevertheless, Sato's reputation improved thanks to his professional attitude and competitive spirit. The team introduced a new car, the SA06 at the German Grand Prix and by the end of the season, Sato was outpacing the Midland cars. At the season finale in Brazil, Sato finished tenth just two places short of a points finish and comfortably ahead of both Toro Rossos and the Spyker MF1s.

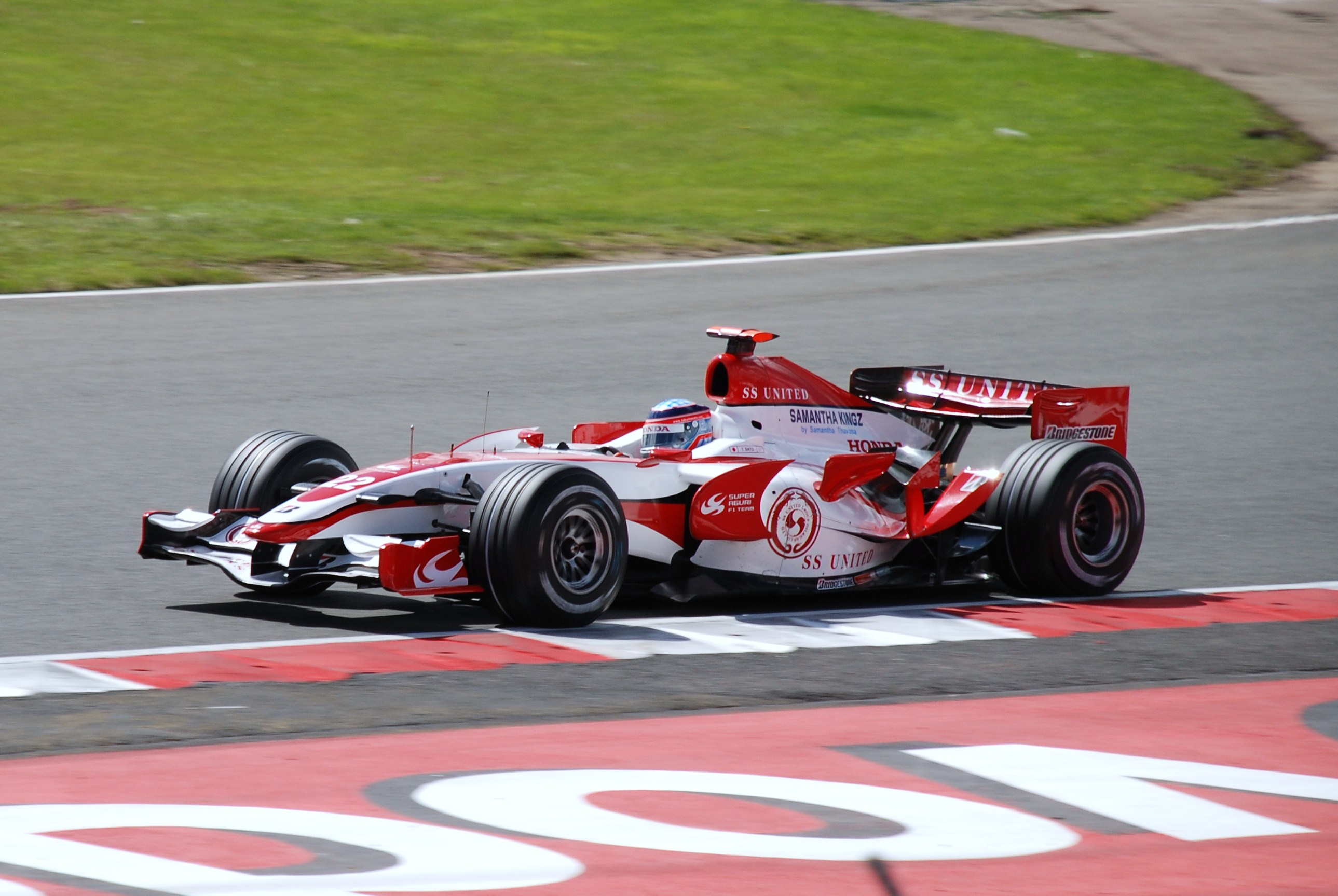
Sato driving the Super Aguri SA07 in 2007. He scored the team's only points.

For 2007, Super Aguri ran a reworked version of the previous year's Honda RA106 chassis. Their performance improved drastically as Sato made it through to Q3 at the Australian Grand Prix. He then scored the first point for the team at the Spanish Grand Prix. At the Canadian Grand Prix, Sato finished sixth after having a race that had seen him move from the middle of the grid to a high of fifth, passing Ferrari's Kimi Räikkönen before a pit-stop error dropped him back to eleventh. He moved up five places in the last fifteen laps, passing Toyota's Ralf Schumacher and then on lap 67 the McLaren-Mercedes of Fernando Alonso; the latter pass was met with cheers around the track and received him the "Overtake of the Year" award from F1 Racing magazine.

Financial problems began to affect the team in the off-season and the squad only just made it to the opening round of the 2008 season in Australia. The team used a modified Honda RA107 chassis, which was launched just before the first Friday practice session that weekend. A transmission issue in Australia ended an opportunity to score points in a race of attrition, and thirteenth in Spain turned out to be Sato's best result of the season. Due to the financial struggles, Super Aguri withdrew from Formula One after the Spanish Grand Prix, leaving Sato without a drive after four races in 2008.

In late 2008, Sato took part in tests at Jerez with Scuderia Toro Rosso, to become a candidate to fill the seat vacated by Sebastian Vettel. He was competing against former Toro Rosso driver Sébastien Bourdais and Red Bull Racing test and reserve driver Sébastien Buemi for one of the two race seats. He first drove on 18 September, more than four months since Super Aguri's withdrawal, and tested for the team again for two days in November, setting the fastest time on the seventeenth, three tenths ahead of Buemi, and proceeded by setting the second-fastest time on the 18th. The race seat was eventually given to Bourdais, and in March 2009 it was announced that Sato would not be the reserve driver for the Red Bull team.

== IndyCar career ==
=== KV Racing Technology (2010–2011) ===
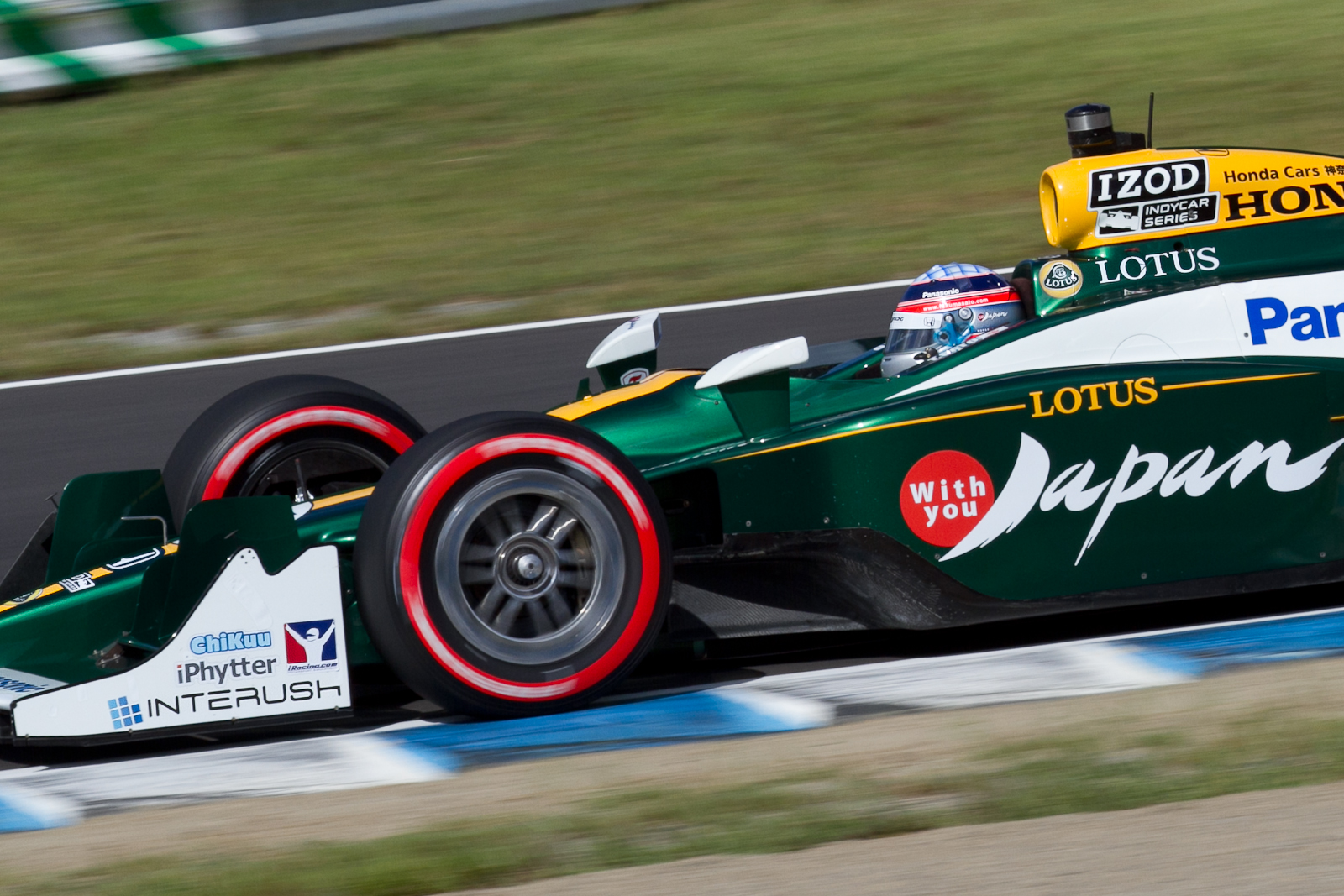
Sato driving for KV Racing Technology at the 2011 Indy Japan 300.

Sato visited the Indianapolis 500 in May 2009. He signed with KV Racing Technology to drive in the 2010 IndyCar Series season finishing in 21st place. He signed for the same team for 2011 and improved his form, scoring three top-five finishes and two pole positions during the season to finish thirteenth.

=== Rahal Letterman Lanigan Racing (2012) ===
At the 2012 Indianapolis 500, driving for Rahal Letterman Lanigan Racing, Sato chased Dario Franchitti to the finish making a move for the lead and the race win at the first turn of the last lap. While not successful, Sato was respected by Indianapolis 500 fans for "going for it" on the last lap.

=== A. J. Foyt Enterprises (2013–2016) ===
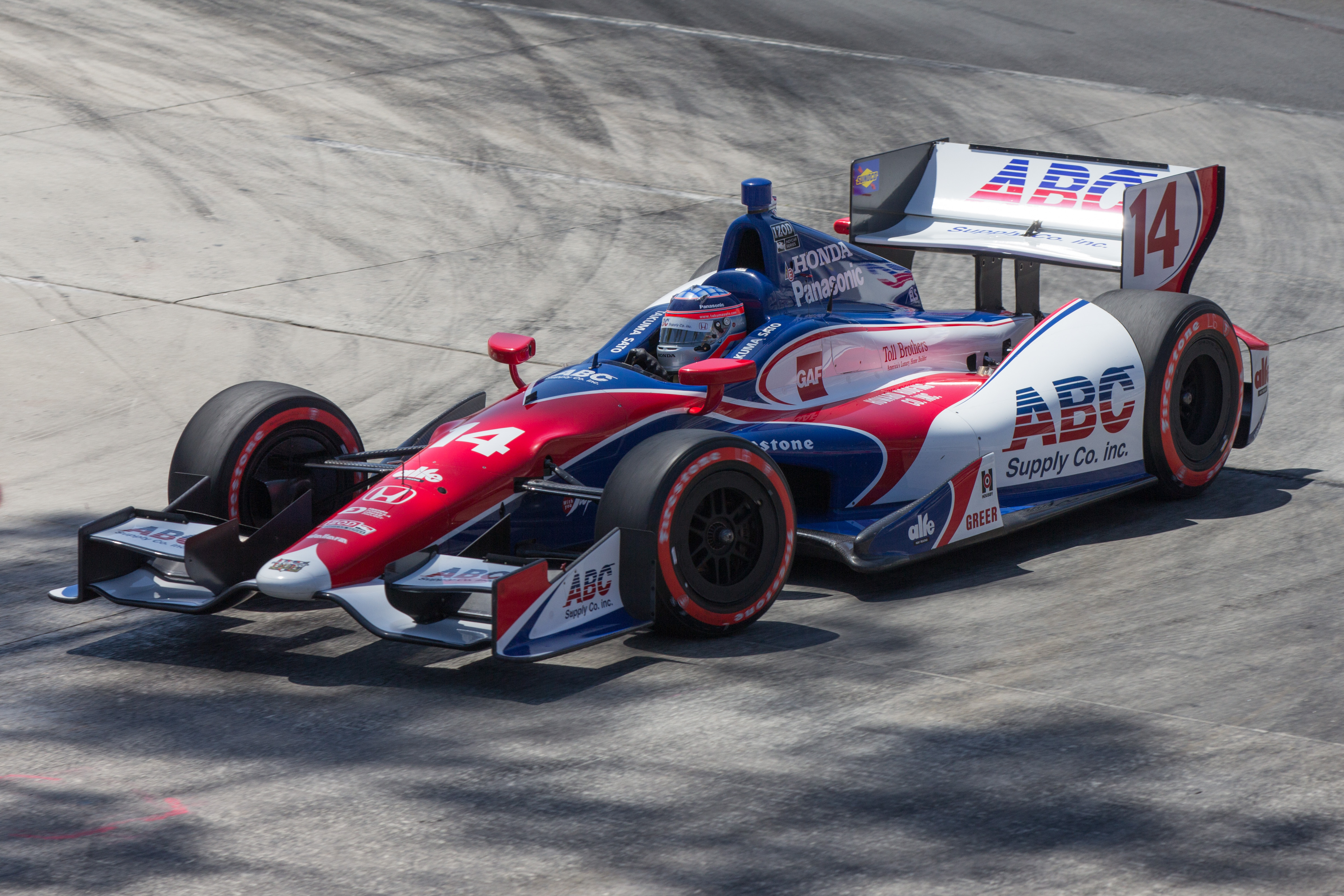
Sato at the 2013 Grand Prix of Long Beach, where he took his first IndyCar win and became the first Japanese driver to do so.

For 2013, Sato joined A. J. Foyt's team, driving the No. 14 car vacated by Mike Conway. In the third race of the season at Long Beach, Sato scored his first IndyCar win, in his 52nd start in the series, making him the first Japanese driver to win an IndyCar race. He then scored six top-five finishes, including two podiums and two pole positions, until he left the team at the end of 2016.

=== Andretti Autosport (2017) ===
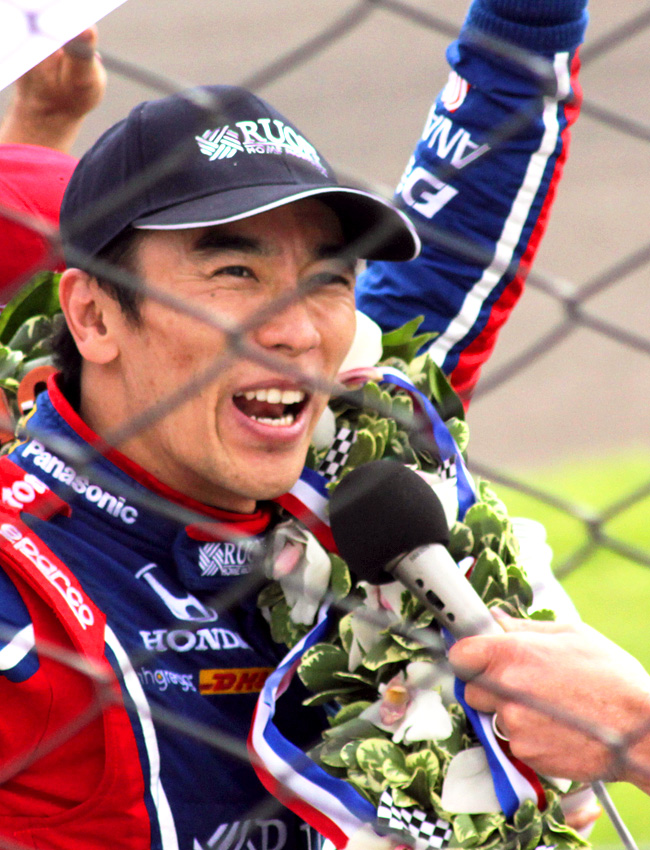
Takuma Sato after winning the Indianapolis 500 on 28 May 2017

Sato joined Andretti Autosport for the 2017 season. He went on to become the first Asian driver to win the Indianapolis 500. After the 500 win, he went on to win a pole at the Dual in Detroit on Belle Isle. He also ended up winning another pole at Pocono Raceway in August.

=== Return to Rahal Letterman Lanigan Racing (2018–2021) ===
On 26 August 2017, it was reported that Sato would rejoin RLL for the 2018 season, driving the No. 30 car alongside Graham Rahal as teammate. The decision came while Andretti Autosport was considering a move to Chevrolet for 2018, however Andretti ultimately chose to remain with Honda.

Sato endured an up-and-down season, including crashing early during the Indianapolis 500, getting caught in an early wreck during the Pocono 500, and a failed pit strategy at Gateway. However, he recorded a top-three finish at Iowa, and had the correct strategy to hold off Ryan Hunter-Reay for a victory during IndyCar's return to Portland, after a low starting position of 20th; the win marked Sato's third career victory, and his first on a permanent road course.

Sato started his 2019 season with a win in the third race at Barber Motorsports Park; he convincingly beat the field after starting from the pole. He endured a difficult Pocono 500; after involvement in a first-lap accident and initial criticism from drivers and media, RLL released on-board camera footage indicating Sato was not at fault for the accident. Sato won later that season at Gateway.

On 23 August 2020, after qualifying on the outside of the front row for the 104th running of the Indianapolis 500, Sato won the race for a second time.

On 5 October 2021, it was announced that Sato would not return to the team for the 2022 IndyCar season. His spot in the team was taken over by Danish driver, Christian Lundgaard.

=== Dale Coyne Racing (2022) ===
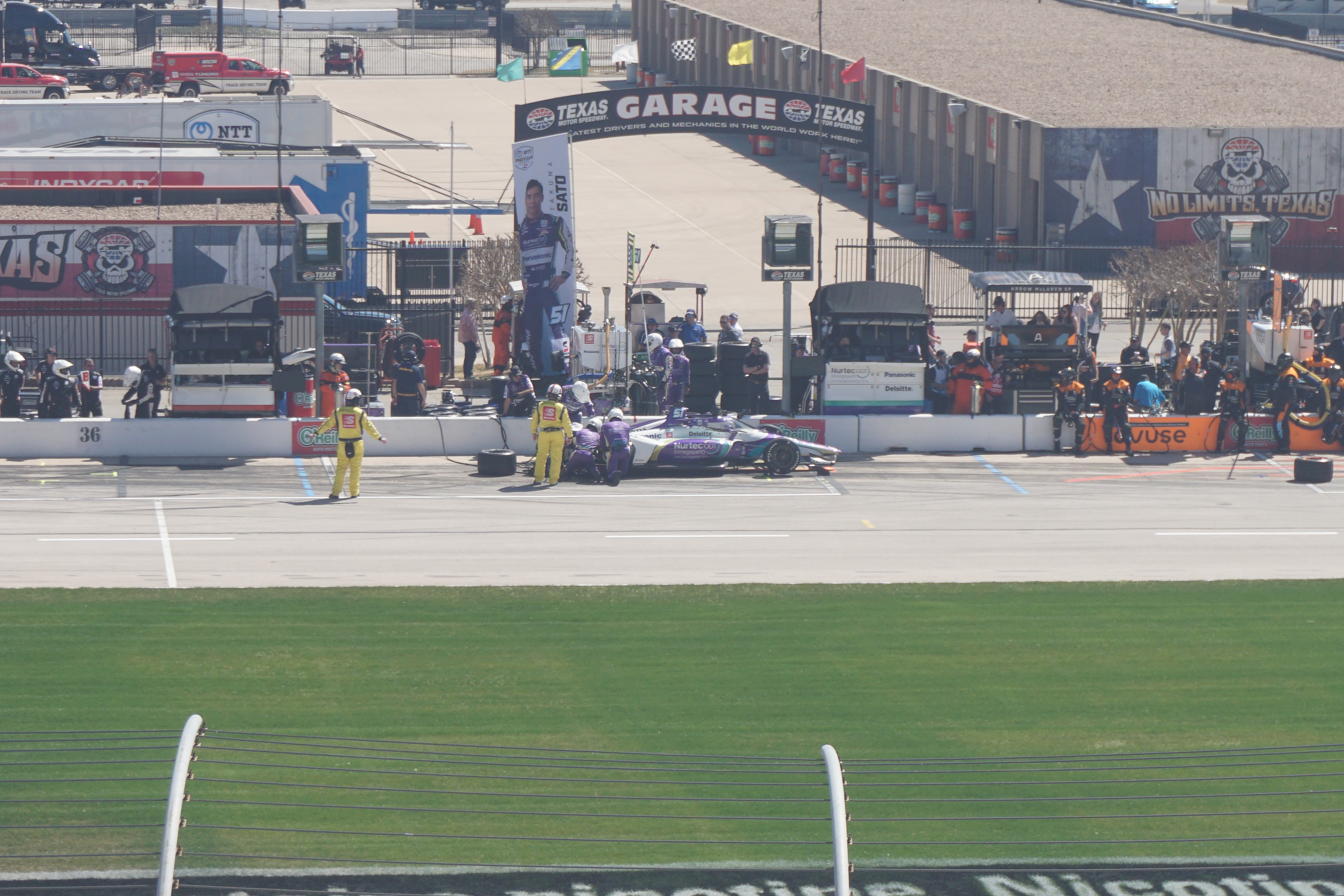
Sato during the 2022 XPEL 375

On 9 December 2021, it was announced that Sato had signed with Dale Coyne Racing with Rick Ware Racing for the 2022 season, replacing Romain Grosjean, who had signed with Andretti Autosport. He finished 25th at the Indianapolis 500.

=== Chip Ganassi Racing (2023) ===
Sato joined Chip Ganassi Racing to run only the oval rounds for the 2023 season, making it the first time he was without a full-time IndyCar seat since 2010.

=== Second return to Rahal Letterman Lanigan Racing (2024–present) ===
On 18 March 2024, Rahal Letterman Lanigan Racing (RLL) announced that Sato would rejoin the team for an Indianapolis 500-only drive. He finished fourteenth after showing significantly more speed than his teammates, making the Fast 12 round of qualifying.

Sato returned to RLL for the 2025 Indianapolis 500. He again displayed significantly more pace than his teammates, qualifying in second – the middle of the front row. Sato ran at or near the front of the field during the first half of the race, and was in strong contention for the victory when he overshot his pit box on lap 86, losing critical time as his pit crew pushed him back into place. He eventually finished eleventh on-track, and was later promoted to ninth place following the disqualifications of Andretti drivers Marcus Ericsson and Kyle Kirkwood. Sato led 51 laps—the most of the field.

RLL confirmed in March that Sato would once again contest the Indianapolis 500 with them. He originally qualified 13th for the race, before being promoted to 12th, after Caio Collet was demoted to the back of the field after his car failed post qualifying inspections. He finished the race in tenth place.

== Other categories ==
=== Formula Nippon / Super Formula ===
On 14 June 2012, Team Mugen announced that Sato would race with the team in the last three rounds of the 2012 Formula Nippon season. He also raced with Team Mugen in the opening round of the renamed 2013 Super Formula season, and later in the year returned to the team to compete in the last three races of the season; he scored his first points with an eighth-place finish in the season finale.

=== Formula E ===
In November 2013, Sato became a test and development driver for the FIA Formula E Championship. In September 2014, Sato joined his former Formula One team Amlin Aguri to race in the first-ever Formula E race, the 2014 Beijing ePrix, replacing the team's regular driver Antonio Félix da Costa as he could not participate due to other commitments. Sato scored two points after he set the fastest lap of the race with a time of 1:45.101, but had to retire from the race with mechanical issues. As it was Sato's only Formula E race, he became the only driver in the series' history with a 100% fastest lap record.

== Reception ==
Sato is a widely popular figure amongst fans and media, renowned for his aggressive driving style and motto "No Attack, No Chance".

== Honors ==
In 2024, Sato was inducted into the Long Beach Motorsports Walk of Fame.

== Personal life ==
Sato is married to Chiharu Sato, with whom he has two children. The eldest, Rintaro Sato, made his racing debut in 2024 F4 Japanese Championship.

He was a national cycling champion in high school, and still uses cycling as part of his physical training for his racing career.

He lives in Carmel, Indiana with his manager, Steve Fusek, during the racing season, and spends the offseason in Japan. Fusek has managed Sato since 2012 and been involved in IndyCar since 1987, working as the VP of Sales and Marketing for CART from 2001–2003 and VP of Business Operations at PacWest Racing in 1995–2001. Before Fusek, Andrew Gilbert-Scott was Sato's manager since his junior formula career in Europe until 2009.

== Racing record ==
=== Career summary ===
Season	Series	Team	Races	Wins	Poles	Points	Position
1998	All-Japan Formula Three Championship	Dome Project	1	0	0	0	NC
1999	British Formula 3 Championship - National Class	Diamond Racing	7	2	2	103	4th
1999	Europa Cup Britain	Diamond Racing	?	1	?	48	**2nd**
1999	Formula Opel European Union Series	Diamond Racing	?	1	?	115	6th
1999	Macau Asian Formula 2000 Challenge	Meritus.GP	1	1	1	0	**1st**
2000	British Formula 3 Championship	Carlin Motorsport	12	4	6	129	**3rd**
2000	European Formula 3 Cup	Carlin Motorsport	1	0	0	N/A	NC
2000	Macau Grand Prix	Carlin Motorsport	1	0	0	N/A	14th
2000	Masters of Formula 3	Carlin Motorsport	1	0	0	N/A	28th
2000	Korea Super Prix	Carlin Motorsport	1	0	0	N/A	8th
2001	British Formula 3 Championship	Carlin Motorsport	25	12	6	345	**1st**
2001	European Formula 3 Cup	Carlin Motorsport	1	0	0	N/A	NC
2001	Macau Grand Prix	Carlin Motorsport	1	1	0	N/A	**1st**
2001	Masters of Formula 3	Carlin Motorsport	1	1	1	N/A	**1st**
2001	Formula One	Lucky Strike BAR Honda	Test driver				
2002	Formula One	DHL Jordan Honda	17	0	0	2	15th
2003	Formula One	Lucky Strike BAR Honda	1	0	0	3	18th
2004	Formula One	Lucky Strike BAR Honda	18	0	0	34	8th
2005	Formula One	Lucky Strike BAR Honda	16	0	0	1	23rd
2006	Formula One	Super Aguri F1 Team	18	0	0	0	23rd
2007	Formula One	Super Aguri F1 Team	17	0	0	4	17th
2008	Formula One	Super Aguri F1 Team	4	0	0	0	21st
2008	Formula One	Scuderia Toro Rosso	Test driver				
2010	IndyCar Series	KV Racing Technology	17	0	0	214	21st
2011	IndyCar Series	KV Racing Technology - Lotus	17	0	2	282	13th
2012	IndyCar Series	Rahal Letterman Lanigan Racing	15	0	0	281	14th
2012	Formula Nippon	Team Mugen	3	0	0	0	15th
2013	IndyCar Series	A. J. Foyt Enterprises	19	1	2	322	17th
2013	Super Formula	Team Mugen	4	0	0	0.5	18th
2014	IndyCar Series	A. J. Foyt Enterprises	18	0	2	350	18th
2014–15	Formula E	Amlin Aguri	1	0	0	2	24th
2015	IndyCar Series	A. J. Foyt Enterprises	16	0	0	323	14th
2016	IndyCar Series	A. J. Foyt Enterprises	16	0	0	320	17th
2017	IndyCar Series	Andretti Autosport	17	1	2	441	8th
2018	IndyCar Series	Rahal Letterman Lanigan Racing	17	1	0	351	12th
2019	IndyCar Series	Rahal Letterman Lanigan Racing	17	2	2	415	9th
2020	IndyCar Series	Rahal Letterman Lanigan Racing	14	1	1	348	7th
2021	IndyCar Series	Rahal Letterman Lanigan Racing	16	0	0	324	11th
2022	IndyCar Series	Dale Coyne Racing with Rick Ware Racing	17	0	0	258	19th
2023	IndyCar Series	Chip Ganassi Racing	5	0	0	70	29th
2024	IndyCar Series	Rahal Letterman Lanigan Racing	1	0	0	19	37th
2025	IndyCar Series	Rahal Letterman Lanigan Racing	1	0	0	36	28th
2026	IndyCar Series	Rahal Letterman Lanigan Racing	1	0	0	20	27th

* Season still in progress.

=== Complete British Formula Three Championship results ===
(key) (Races in bold indicate pole position) (Races in italics indicate fastest lap)

Year	Entrant	Chassis	Engine	Class	1	2	3	4	5	6	7	8	9	10	11	12	13	14	15	16	17	18	19	20	21	22	23	24	25	26	27	DC	Pts
1999	Diamond Racing	Dallara F398	Mugen-Honda	B	DON	SIL	THR	BRH	BRH	OUL	CRO	BRH	SIL; 16	SNE; 10	PEM; 14	PEM; Ret	DON	SPA; 18	**SIL**; 8	THR; 11												4th	103
2000	Carlin Motorsport	Dallara F300	Mugen-Honda	A	THR; Ret	CRO; 5	OUL; Ret	**DON**; Ret	DON; 9	**SIL**; 1	BRH; 2	DON; 3	DON; 9	**CRO**; 1	**SIL**; 1	SNE; 6	**SPA**; 21	SIL; 1														3rd	129
2001	Carlin Motorsport	Dallara F301	Mugen-Honda	A	SIL1; 1; 12	SIL1; 2; 4	SNE; 1 Ret	SNE; 2; 2	DON1; 1; 1	DON1; 2 Ret	**OUL**; **1**; 1	OUL; 2; 1	CRO; 1 DSQ	CRO; 2; 1	ROC; 1; 1	ROC; 2; 1	**CAS**; **1**; 2	CAS; 2; 2	**BRH1**; **1**; 9	BRH1; 2; 1	**DON2**; **1**; 12	**DON2**; **2**; 1	KNO; 1; 1	KNO; 2 C	THR; 1; 1	THR; 2; 2	THR; 3; 8	BRH2; 1; 2	BRH2; 2; 1	SIL2; 1; 18	**SIL2**; **2**; 1	1st	345

=== Complete Formula One results ===
(key) (Races in bold indicate pole position; races in italics indicate fastest lap)

Year	Entrant	Chassis	Engine	1	2	3	4	5	6	7	8	9	10	11	12	13	14	15	16	17	18	19	WDC	Points
2002	DHL Jordan Honda	Jordan EJ12	Honda RA002E 3.0 V10	AUS; Ret	MAL; 9	BRA; 9	SMR; Ret	ESP; Ret	AUT; Ret	MON; Ret	CAN; 10	EUR; 16	GBR; Ret	FRA; Ret	GER; 8	HUN; 10	BEL; 11	ITA; 12	USA; 11	JPN; 5			15th	2
2003	Lucky Strike BAR Honda	BAR 005	Honda RA003E 3.0 V10	AUS	MAL	BRA	SMR	ESP	AUT	MON	CAN	EUR	FRA	GBR	GER	HUN	ITA	USA	JPN; 6				18th	3
2004	Lucky Strike BAR Honda	BAR 006	Honda RA004E 3.0 V10	AUS; 9	MAL; 15^{†}	BHR; 5	SMR; 16^{†}	ESP; 5	MON; Ret	EUR; Ret	CAN; Ret	USA; 3	FRA; Ret	GBR; 11	GER; 8	HUN; 6	BEL; Ret	ITA; 4	CHN; 6	JPN; 4	BRA; 6		8th	34
2005	Lucky Strike BAR Honda	BAR 007	Honda RA005E 3.0 V10	AUS; 14	MAL; PO	BHR; Ret	SMR; DSQ	ESP	MON	EUR; 12	CAN; Ret	USA; DNS	FRA; 11	GBR; 16	GER; 12	HUN; 8	TUR; 9	ITA; 16	BEL; Ret	BRA; 10	JPN; DSQ	CHN; Ret	23rd	1
2006	Super Aguri F1 Team	Super Aguri SA05	Honda RA806E 2.4 V8	BHR; 18	MAL; 14	AUS; 12	SMR; Ret	EUR; Ret	ESP; 17	MON; Ret	GBR; 17	CAN; 15^{†}	USA; Ret	FRA; Ret									23rd	0
2006	Super Aguri F1 Team	Super Aguri SA06	Honda RA806E 2.4 V8												GER; Ret	HUN; 13	TUR; NC	ITA; 16	CHN; DSQ	JPN; 15	BRA; 10		23rd	0
2007	Super Aguri F1 Team	Super Aguri SA07	Honda RA807E 2.4 V8	AUS; 12	MAL; 13	BHR; Ret	ESP; 8	MON; 17	CAN; 6	USA; Ret	FRA; 16	GBR; 14	EUR; Ret	HUN; 15	TUR; 18	ITA; 16	BEL; 15	JPN; 15^{†}	CHN; 14	BRA; 12			17th	4
2008	Super Aguri F1 Team	Super Aguri SA08	Honda RA808E 2.4 V8	AUS; Ret	MAL; 16	BHR; 17	ESP; 13	TUR	MON	CAN	FRA	GBR	GER	HUN	EUR	BEL	ITA	SIN	CHN	JPN	BRA		21st	0

^{†} Did not finish the race, but was classified as he had completed more than 90% of the race distance.

=== American open-wheel racing ===
(key) (Races in bold indicate pole position; races in italics indicate fastest lap)

==== IndyCar Series ====
Year	Team	No.	Chassis	Engine	1	2	3	4	5	6	7	8	9	10	11	12	13	14	15	16	17	18	19	Rank	Points	Ref
2010	KV Racing Technology	5	Dallara IR-05	Honda	SAO; 22	STP; 22	ALA; 25	LBH; 18	KAN; 24	INDY; 20	TXS; 25	IOW; 19	WGL; 15	TOR; 25	EDM; 9	MOH; 25	SNM; 18	CHI; 26	KTY; 27	MOT; 12	HMS; 18			21st	214	
2011	KV Racing Technology – Lotus	5	Dallara IR-05	Honda	STP; 5	ALA; 17	LBH; 21	SAO; 8	INDY; 33	TXS; 5	TXS; 12	MIL; 8	**IOW**; 19	TOR; 20	**EDM**; 21	MOH; 4	NHM; 7	SNM; 18	BAL; 18	MOT; 10	KTY; 15	LVS^{1} C		13th	282	
2012	Rahal Letterman Lanigan Racing	15	Dallara DW12	Honda	STP; 22	ALA; 24	LBH; 8	SAO; 3	INDY; 17	DET; 20	TXS; 22	MIL; 20	IOW; 12	TOR; 9	EDM; 2	MOH; 13	SNM; 27	BAL; 21	FON; 7					14th	281	
2013	A. J. Foyt Enterprises	14	Dallara DW12	Honda	STP; 8	ALA; 14	LBH; 1	SAO; 2	INDY; 13	DET; 19	DET; 23	TXS; 11	MIL; 7	IOW; 23	POC; 22	TOR; 24	TOR; 20	MOH; 22	SNM; 23	BAL; 24	**HOU**; 17	HOU; 14	FON; 17	17th	322	
2014	A. J. Foyt Enterprises	14	Dallara DW12	Honda	**STP**; 7	LBH; 22	ALA; 13	IMS; 9	INDY; 19	DET; 18	**DET**; 18	TXS; 18	HOU; 22	HOU; 19	POC; 21	IOW; 22	TOR; 23	TOR; 5	MOH; 18	MIL; 15	SNM; 4	FON; 6		18th	350	
2015	A. J. Foyt Enterprises	14	Dallara DW12	Honda	STP; 13	NLA; 22	LBH; 18	ALA; 17	IMS; 9	INDY; 13	DET; 11	DET; 2	TXS; 16	TOR; 10	FON; 18	MIL; 14	IOW; 19	MOH; 24	POC; 6	SNM; 8				14th	323	
2016	A. J. Foyt Enterprises	14	Dallara DW12	Honda	STP; 6	PHX; 15	LBH; 5	ALA; 13	IMS; 18	INDY; 26	DET; 11	DET; 10	RDA; 17	IOW; 11	TOR; 5	MOH; 9	POC; 22	TXS; 20	WGL; 17	SNM; 14				17th	320	
2017	Andretti Autosport	26	Dallara DW12	Honda	STP; 5	LBH; 18	ALA; 9	PHX; 16	IMS; 12	INDY; 1	DET; 8	**DET**; 4	TXS; 10	RDA; 19	IOW; 16	TOR; 16	MOH; 5	**POC**; 13	GTW; 19	WGL; 19	SNM; 20			8th	441	
2018	Rahal Letterman Lanigan Racing	30	Dallara DW12	Honda	STP; 12	PHX; 11	LBH; 21	ALA; 8	IMS; 10	INDY; 32	DET; 5	DET; 17	TXS; 7	RDA; 4	IOW; 3	TOR; 22	MOH; 17	POC; 21	GTW; 9	POR; 1	SNM; 25			12th	351	
2019	Rahal Letterman Lanigan Racing	30	Dallara DW12	Honda	STP; 19	COA; 7	**ALA**; 1	LBH; 8	IMS; 14	INDY; 3	DET; 3	DET; 13	**TXS**; 15	RDA; 10	TOR; 22	IOW; 20	MOH; 19	POC; 21	GTW; 1	POR; 15	LAG; 21			9th	415	
2020	Rahal Letterman Lanigan Racing	30	Dallara DW12	Honda	TXS; DNS	IMS; 10	ROA; 9	ROA; 8	IOW; 10	IOW; 21	INDY; 1	GTW; 2	**GTW**; 9	MOH; 17	MOH; 18	IMS; 18	IMS; 14	STP; 10						7th	348	
2021	Rahal Letterman Lanigan Racing	30	Dallara DW12	Honda	ALA; 13	STP; 6	TXS; 9	TXS; 14	IMS; 16	INDY; 14	DET; 4	DET; 12	ROA; 8	MOH; 10	NSH; 25	IMS; 10	GTW; 6	POR; 12	LAG; 27	LBH; 9				11th	324	
2022	Dale Coyne Racing with Rick Ware Racing	51	Dallara DW12	Honda	STP; 10	TXS; 20	LBH; 16	ALA; 13	IMS; 7	INDY; 25	DET; 13	ROA; 15	MOH; 14	TOR; 25	IOW; 21	IOW; 10	IMS; 15	NSH; 21	GTW; 5	POR; 18	LAG; 23			19th	258	
2023	Chip Ganassi Racing	11	Dallara DW12	Honda	STP	TXS; 28	LBH	ALA	IMS	INDY; 7	DET	ROA	MOH	TOR	IOW; 9	IOW; 25	NSH	IMS	GTW; 26	POR	LAG			29th	70	
2024	Rahal Letterman Lanigan Racing	75	Dallara DW12	Honda	STP	THE	LBH	ALA	IMS	INDY; 14	DET	ROA	LAG	MOH	IOW	IOW	TOR	GTW	POR	MIL	MIL	NSH		37th	19	
2025	Rahal Letterman Lanigan Racing	75	Dallara DW12	Honda	STP	THE	LBH	ALA	IMS	INDY; 9*	DET	GTW	ROA	MOH	IOW	IOW	TOR	LAG	POR	MIL	NSH			28th	36	
2026	Rahal Letterman Lanigan Racing	75	Dallara DW12	Honda	STP	PHX	ARL	ALA	LBH	IMS	INDY; 10	DET	GTW	ROA	MOH	NSH	POR	MRK	WSH	MIL	MIL	LAG		27th	20	

^{1} The 2011 Las Vegas Indy 300 was abandoned after Dan Wheldon died from injuries sustained in a 15-car crash on lap 11.

Years	Teams	Races	Poles	Wins	Podiums	Top 5s	Top 10s	Indianapolis 500 wins	Championships
16*	6	223*	10	6	14	28*	77*	2	0

* Results as of 2 September 2025

==== Indianapolis 500 ====
Year	Chassis	Engine	Start	Finish	Team
2010	Dallara	Honda	31	20	KV Racing Technology
2011	Dallara	Honda	10	33	KV Racing Technology – Lotus
2012	Dallara	Honda	19	17	Rahal Letterman Lanigan Racing
2013	Dallara	Honda	18	13	A. J. Foyt Enterprises
2014	Dallara	Honda	23	19	A. J. Foyt Enterprises
2015	Dallara	Honda	24	13	A. J. Foyt Enterprises
2016	Dallara	Honda	12	26	A. J. Foyt Enterprises
2017	Dallara	Honda	4	**1**	Andretti Autosport
2018	Dallara	Honda	16	32	Rahal Letterman Lanigan Racing
2019	Dallara	Honda	14	3	Rahal Letterman Lanigan Racing
2020	Dallara	Honda	3	**1**	Rahal Letterman Lanigan Racing
2021	Dallara	Honda	15	14	Rahal Letterman Lanigan Racing
2022	Dallara	Honda	10	25	Dale Coyne Racing with Rick Ware Racing
2023	Dallara	Honda	8	7	Chip Ganassi Racing
2024	Dallara	Honda	10	14	Rahal Letterman Lanigan Racing
2025	Dallara	Honda	2	9	Rahal Letterman Lanigan Racing
2026	Dallara	Honda	12	10	Rahal Letterman Lanigan Racing

=== Complete FIA World Endurance Championship results ===
Year	Entrant	Class	Chassis	Engine	1	2	3	4	5	6	7	8	Rank	Points
2012	OAK Racing	LMP1	OAK Pescarolo 01	Honda LM-V8 3.4 L V8	SEB	SPA	LMS	SIL	SÃO	BHR	FUJ; 16	SHA; 14	80th	1

=== Complete Formula Nippon / Super Formula results ===
Year	Entrant	1	2	3	4	5	6	7	8	DC	Points
2012	Team Mugen	SUZ	MOT	AUT	FUJ	MOT	SUG; 9	SUZ; 17	SUZ; 10	15th	0
2013	Team Mugen	SUZ; 15	AUT	FUJ	MOT	SUG; 11	SUZ; 9	SUZ; 8		18th	0.5

=== Complete Formula E results ===
(key) (Races in bold indicate pole position; races in italics indicate fastest lap)

Year	Team	Chassis	Powertrain	1	2	3	4	5	6	7	8	9	10	11	Pos	Points
2014–15	Amlin Aguri	Spark SRT01-e	SRT01-e	BEI; Ret	PUT	PDE	BUE	MIA	LBH	MCO	BER	MSC	LDN	LDN	24th	2

== Notes ==
Sporting positions
Preceded by Antônio Pizzonia	British Formula Three Champion; 2001	Succeeded by Robbie Kerr
Preceded by Jonathan Cochet	Masters of Formula 3 Winner; 2001	Succeeded by Fabio Carbone
Preceded by André Couto	Macau Grand Prix; Winner; 2001	Succeeded by Tristan Gommendy
Preceded by Alexander Rossi	Indianapolis 500; Winner; 2017	Succeeded by Will Power
Preceded by Simon Pagenaud	Indianapolis 500; Winner; 2020	Succeeded by Helio Castroneves
Awards and achievements
Preceded by Antônio Pizzonia	Autosport; National Racing Driver of the Year; 2001	Succeeded by Robbie Kerr
