= Shuhei Nakamoto =

Japanese businessman

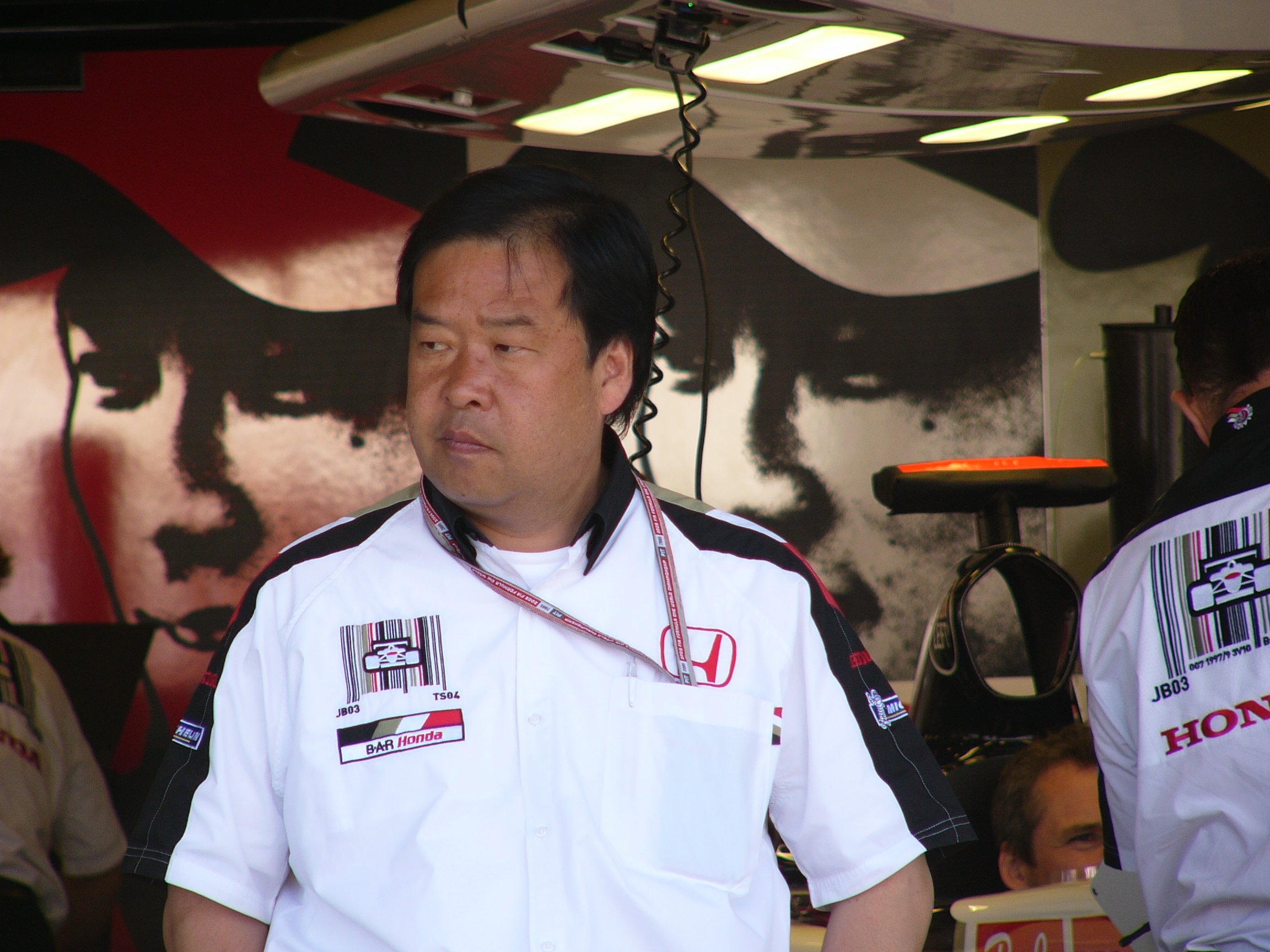
- Shuhei Nakamoto at the 2005 United States Grand Prix.
- Born: 29 April 1957 (age 68)

Shuhei Nakamoto (中本 修平, Nakamoto Shūhei; born 29 April 1957) is the vice-president of Honda Racing Corporation.

== Career ==
Nakamoto joined the Honda Racing Corporation in 1983 and his initial work was based around the corporation's motorcycle racing operations at Honda Racing Corporation (HRC). By 1984, Nakamoto was already project leader on the design of the Honda RS125 and RS250 production racing machines. By 1990 he had been moved up to the role of large project leader on both these machines.

Nakamoto continued to work with motorcycles, but moved to the Honda F1 project in 2000. He gained multiple promotions up until 2002 when he became the race and test team manager for Honda Racing Developments Ltd. (HRD). Another promotion in 2003 led to him becoming engineering director for Honda Racing Developments Ltd., and he stayed in this role until 2006.

During 2006, Nakamoto got his big break being appointed the Senior Technical Director for the Honda F1 team, taking over from Geoff Willis, an aerodynamics specialist.

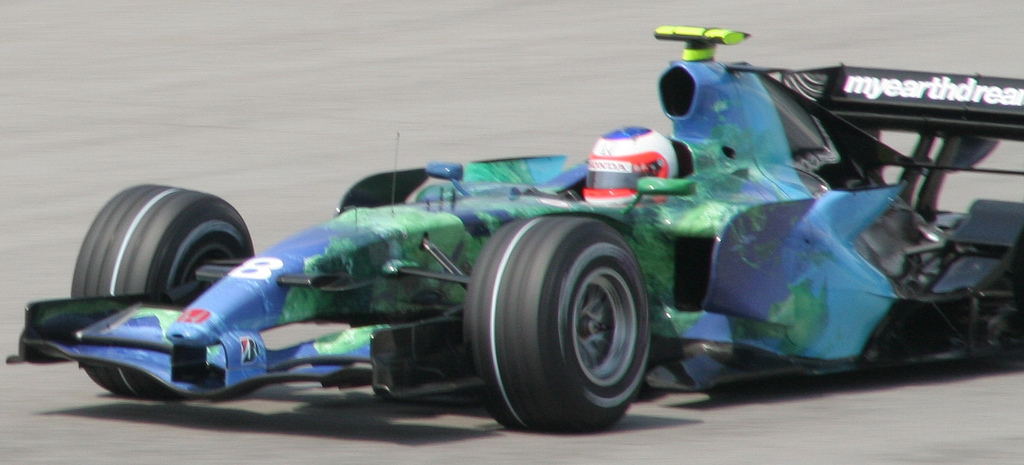
Nakamoto's first Formula One car, Honda RA107

The Honda RA107, the first Formula One car designed under Nakamoto, was very poor, mainly due to bad aerodynamics. The RA107 was even inferior to the Super Aguri SA07, a re-worked model of Willis' Honda RA106 from the previous season.

Various explanations have been proposed for why the car performed so poorly. One was that the wind tunnel which was set up in July, 2006 broke at almost the same time that Geoff Willis was replaced by Nakamoto. Thus, the new car had been designed using a faulty wind tunnel.

To try to fix the aerodynamics problems Honda employed a number of new aerodynamicists including Loïc Bigois, John Owen (ex-BMW Sauber), Ben Agathangelou (ex-Red Bull), Peter Coysh (ex-McLaren) and Francois Martinet (ex-Williams) in July 2007.

On December 1, 2008, four days before Honda announced its withdrawal from Formula One, Nakamoto left the Honda F1 team and returned to HRC as the vice-president where he serves as the team principal of the Repsol Honda MotoGP team.

He retired in November 2016.

== Personal life ==
Nakamoto was born in Tottori, Japan, but now lives with his wife in Maidenhead, England.
