= 2006 Brazilian Grand Prix =

Coordinates: 23°42′13″S 46°41′59″W

Race 18 of 18 in the 2006 Formula One World Championship
← Previous race	Next race →

Race details
- Date: 22 October 2006
- Official name: Formula 1 Grande Prêmio do Brasil 2006
- Location: Autódromo José Carlos Pace, São Paulo, Brazil
- Course: Permanent racing facility
- Course length: 4.309 km (2.677 miles)
- Distance: 71 laps, 305.909 km (190.083 miles)
- Weather: Temperatures reaching up to 23 °C (73 °F)

Pole position
Driver	(Brazil) Felipe Massa	Ferrari
- Time: 1:10.680

Fastest lap
Driver	(Germany) Michael Schumacher	Ferrari
- Time: 1:12.162 on lap 70

Podium
First	(Brazil) Felipe Massa	Ferrari
Second	(Spain) Fernando Alonso	Renault
Third	(United Kingdom) Jenson Button	Honda

The 2006 Brazilian Grand Prix (officially the Formula 1 Grande Prêmio do Brasil 2006) was a Formula One motor race held on 22 October 2006 at the Autódromo José Carlos Pace, São Paulo. It was the eighteenth and final race of the 2006 FIA Formula One World Championship. The race determined the Drivers' and Constructors' Championships for the season, with Fernando Alonso and Renault winning their respective championships. The race itself attracted 154 million viewers.

The 71-lap race was won by local hero Felipe Massa, driving a Ferrari, with Alonso taking second in his Renault and Jenson Button third in a Honda. Massa was the first Brazilian driver to win his home Grand Prix since Ayrton Senna in 1993. Michael Schumacher, in what was expected to be his last race, finished fourth, having started tenth and suffered a puncture which dropped him to 19th.

Schumacher retired from Formula One after this race, with seven Drivers' Championships to his name, although he would return in 2010 with Mercedes. His seat at Ferrari was taken by Kimi Räikkönen, whilst Alonso moved to McLaren to partner rookie Lewis Hamilton.

This race also marked the end of the tyre war which lasted 6 years with Michelin pulling out of the sport, It was also the end of two major tobacco sponsorships with Mild Seven and British American Tobacco ending their association with Renault and Honda and leaving the sport after this race.

As of 2026, this was the last victory for Bridgestone tyres against competition to date.

== Report ==
=== Pre-race ===
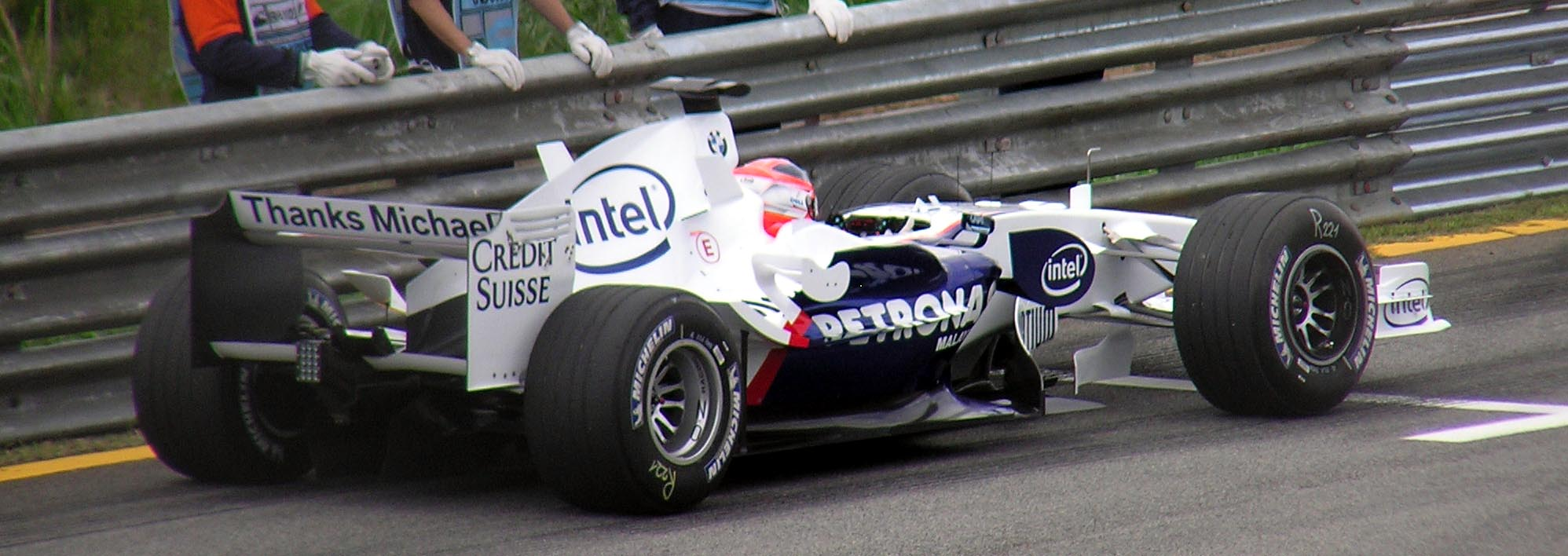
BMW Sauber put "Thanks Michael" messages on the backs of its cars to acknowledge Michael Schumacher's last race before retiring

Following Michael Schumacher's engine failure and Fernando Alonso's victory in the previous race in Japan, Alonso was now 10 points ahead of Schumacher in the Drivers' Championship, and would therefore clinch the championship unless Schumacher won the race and Alonso failed to score a point. Felipe Massa went into the race holding third place in the championship, one point ahead of fourth place Giancarlo Fisichella, who in turn could have his fourth place taken off him as Kimi Räikkönen was 9 points behind him. The final place in the top six of the Drivers' Championship was secure, as the current occupant, Jenson Button, was 11 points behind Räikkönen and 22 points ahead of his Honda teammate, Rubens Barrichello, with a maximum of 10 points available.

In the Constructors' Championship, Renault were leading Ferrari by nine points, meaning that Renault had to score 10 points to secure the title. McLaren were safe in third place with 105 points, 81 points behind Ferrari and 27 points ahead of fourth place Honda. Meanwhile, BMW Sauber and Toyota were still competing for fifth place, with only one point between the two, but their top 6 position was secure as seventh place Red Bull Racing were 19 points behind Toyota.

Räikkönen set the fastest time during the first practice session with 1:13.764. Anthony Davidson managed to take second in his Honda, but none of the Renaults or Ferraris set a competitive time, with Renault opting just to do one installation lap apiece. Alexander Wurz and Sebastian Vettel completed the top four.

Before the race began, Michael Schumacher was given a lifetime achievement award by footballer Pelé.

=== Race ===
==== Start ====
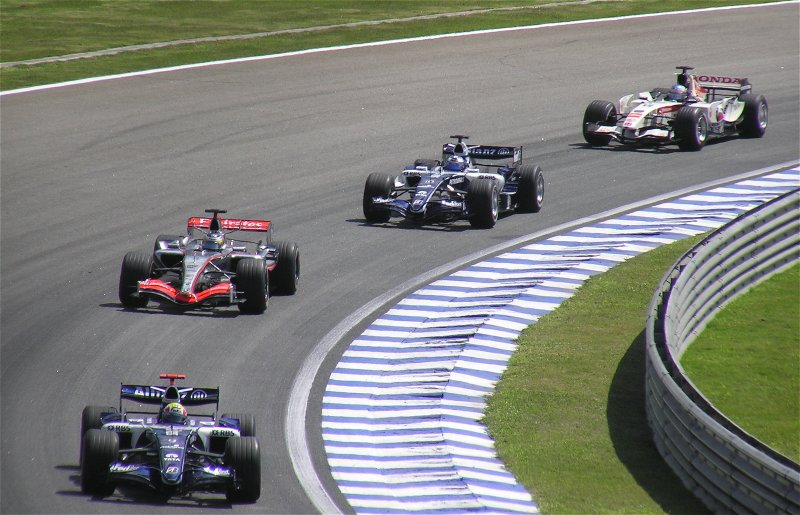
Both Williams retired on the first lap after colliding with each other.

At the start Felipe Massa retained his lead going into the first bend, ahead of Kimi Räikkönen and Jarno Trulli. Championship elect Fernando Alonso kept his fourth position despite a challenge around the outside of the first corner by Rubens Barrichello's Honda. Michael Schumacher had a decent start from his 10th position on the grid and was on the inside of the two BMW Saubers going into the first corner, but had to back off to avoid a collision. His apparently much quicker Ferrari allowed him to pass both BMWs three corners later as they were slowed by Robert Kubica overtaking teammate Nick Heidfeld on the back straight. A little further behind, the two Williams-Cosworths collided as Nico Rosberg hit the back of Mark Webber's car going into turn 4. Both cars were severely damaged with Webber retiring at the end of the lap with a missing rear wing. Rosberg in turn had another high-speed crash on the uphill main straight: he lost grip and spun heavily into the wall, due to the damage sustained in the earlier contact with his teammate. Rosberg was unhurt but the scattered debris on the track led to the safety car being deployed to allow for the track to be cleaned. Before the safety car came out, Barrichello's Honda was overtaken on the outside into turn 1 by Giancarlo Fisichella.

==== Safety car and restart ====
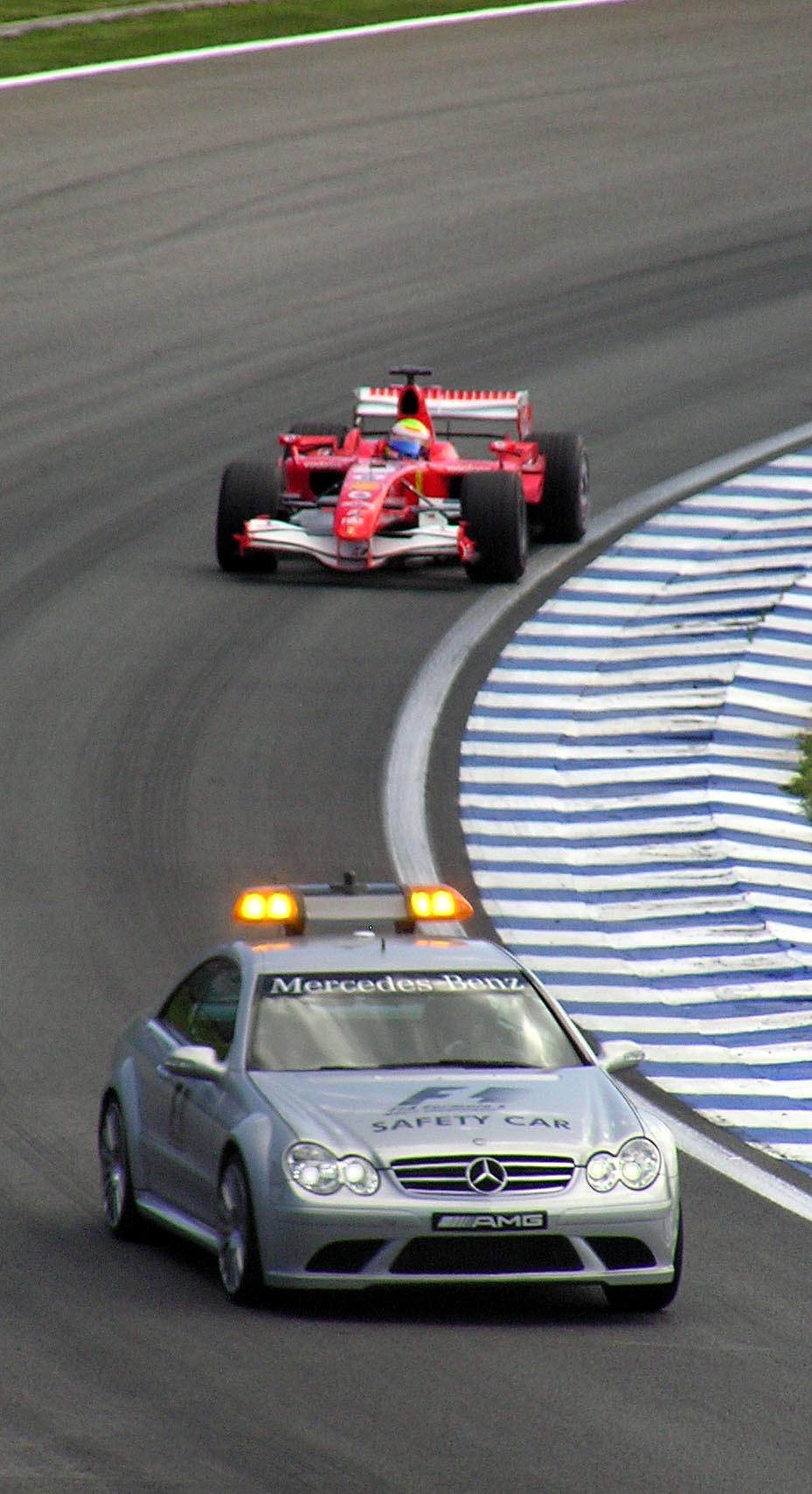
Massa behind the Safety Car

As the safety car picked up the field at the end of lap 2, Massa led Räikkönen, Trulli and Alonso with Fisichella and Michael Schumacher moving up to 5th and 6th respectively. Barrichello, Ralf Schumacher, Kubica and Button completed the top ten, Button having taken advantage of the two Williams retiring and having passed Heidfeld and Pedro de la Rosa.

The restart took place on lap six and saw Button move past Kubica on the inside as the two crossed the line only 0.038secs apart. Michael Schumacher was also soon to attack Fisichella's Renault, forcing the Italian to protect the inside line in turns 4 and 5. On the next lap Button went past Ralf Schumacher up to 8th while Massa was pulling away comfortably from his pursuers at the front. His teammate Schumacher tried to move past Fisichella around the outside on the main straight. But Fisichella put up a fight, staying on the inside on the entry into the 1st corner. Schumacher aggressively cut across to the inside into the first corner, trying to force Fisichella to back off. Fisichella tried to avoid contact by moving onto the kerb, but his front wing appeared to make very light contact with the Ferrari's left rear tyre. Indeed, Schumacher's car began to slide violently in the next corner as his tyre deflated forcing the German to drive the entire lap at significantly reduced speed, and to see the entire field move past him in the process. The Ferrari team took eleven seconds to change all four tyres - taking the opportunity to add fuel as well. When Schumacher rejoined, he was only a few seconds in front of his teammate Massa thus being almost a lap down on the race leader.

The two Ferraris proceeded to post the quickest lap times with Massa comfortably increasing his gap to Räikkönen in second, while the Toyotas hit trouble with first Ralf Schumacher and then Jarno Trulli retiring in the pits on lap 10. This meant that the order on lap 11 was: 1st Massa, 2nd Räikkönen, 3rd Alonso, 4th Fisichella, 5th Barrichello, 6th Button, 7th Kubica, 8th de la Rosa, 9th Heidfeld, 10th Scott Speed, 11th Vitantonio Liuzzi, 12th David Coulthard, 13th Takuma Sato, 14th Christijan Albers, 15th Sakon Yamamoto, 16th Robert Doornbos, 17th Tiago Monteiro and 18th and last Michael Schumacher's Ferrari.

The race now settled into a steady pattern with the Ferraris still quickest and Alonso closing to within two seconds of Räikkönen's McLaren. Coulthard retired his Red Bull-Ferrari with mechanical problems on lap 14. The first planned pitstops took place on lap 21 with Räikkönen, Fisichella and Barrichello all coming in for fuel and tires. Fisichella's stop was slightly slower than Barrichello's, which nearly resulted in a collision as the two exited the pitlane - the Renault driver only just maintaining his position. They reemerged on the track 7th, 8th and 9th respectively, just behind de la Rosa and Heidfeld who had hitherto been contesting 8th place with Heidfeld quicker in the corners but unable to match the McLaren's straight-line speed. Massa closed to within a couple of seconds of lapping his teammate, setting a fastest lap of 1:12.8 before pitting on lap 23 at which point he had a 15-second gap to Alonso in second. Massa was stationary for just over 8 seconds and rejoined in third behind Button who was now in second despite having started 14th. Button pitted on the next lap, his 7.9 second stop allowing him to rejoin in 7th comfortably ahead of Fisichella and Barrichello. Alonso made his stop on the following lap and was able to rejoin just in front of Räikkönen but still behind de la Rosa and Heidfeld. Kubica then pitted from second position on lap 26 and dropped to 9th. His teammate followed suit on lap 27 falling behind the two Toro Rosso in the process just as Button was able to slipstream Räikkönen and outbrake him into turn one. Massa now led by 17 seconds in front of de la Rosa, who would not stop until 8 laps later. Alonso, Button and Räikkönen followed with a small gap back to Fisichella and Barrichello.

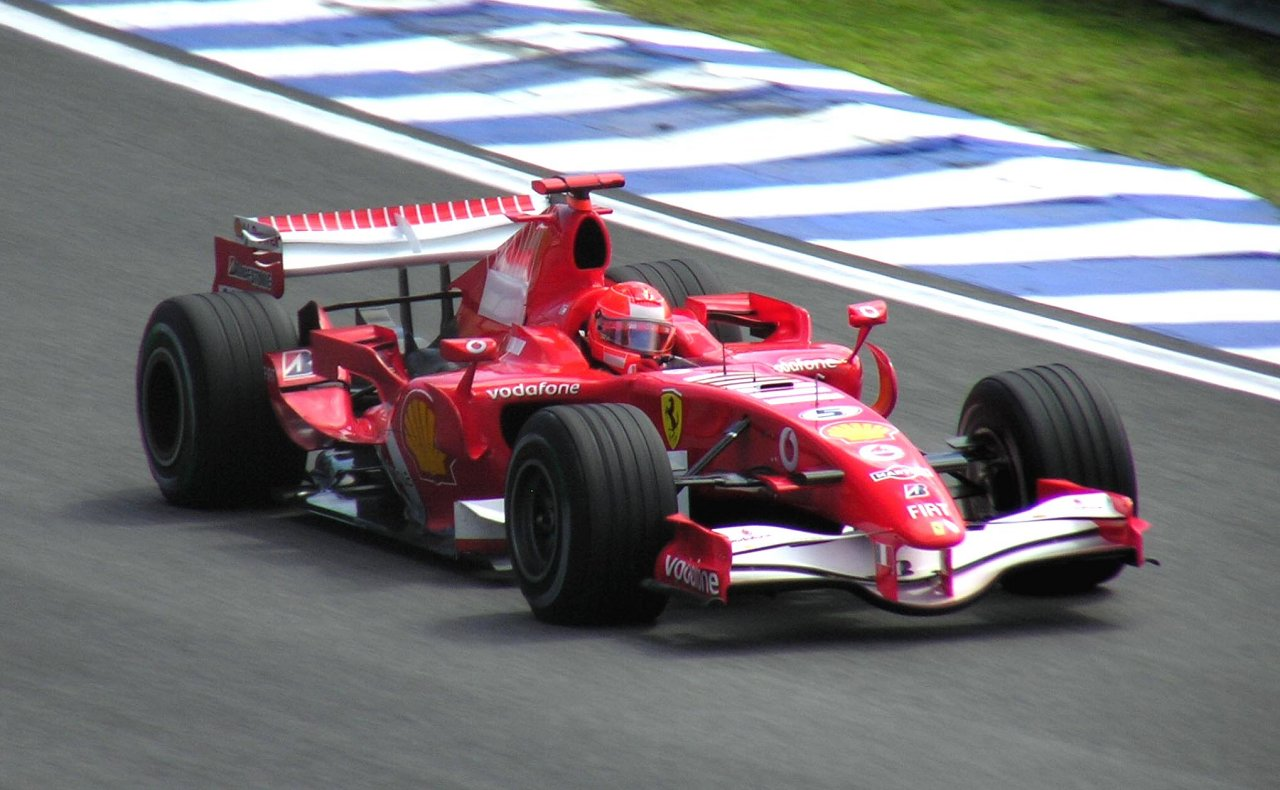
A puncture deflated Michael Schumacher's race chances, but he fought back to finish fourth

Michael Schumacher had moved up to 13th courtesy of pitstops by the Aguris and on lap 31 he moved past Doornbos and closed on Liuzzi who had just been involved in an incident with Heidfeld, whom he had steered into just as Heidfeld was overtaking the Italian into turn 1. The BMW driver's front wing suffered some damage from the contact but he was able to carry on. Liuzzi then pitted leaving Schumacher 11th and just 3 seconds behind Heidfeld. They both advanced one position on lap 33 as Scott Speed also pitted in his Toro Rosso. Up front, Massa was still pulling away, now 23 seconds in front of de la Rosa, Alonso, Button and Räikkönen, who were all still very close together. De la Rosa pitted on lap 35 for his one and only pitstop (10.8s) dropping to 10th. Schumacher easily passed Heidfeld for ninth on the following lap when Heidfeld was forced into the pits again on lap 38 to have the damaged front wing replaced, dropping him out of any contention for the points.

Barrichello was first into the pits when the second and last round of regular pitstops began on lap 46. His stop lasted 8.3 seconds. Schumacher followed on lap 47 having driven 36 laps since his first unscheduled stop. He rejoined in 8th just between Barrichello and the one-stopping de la Rosa. Fisichella did his stop (7.2s) on lap 49. Button was into the pits (7.3s) on the following lap while Schumacher effortlessly passed Barrichello on the inside on the main straight. Räikkönen was next man to pit, rejoining in fourth - only just behind Button, who was busy lapping Yamamoto and the Spykers. Leader Massa made his stop on lap 52 and rejoined still in front of second placed Alonso, who also kept his position after he came in two laps later (6.8s).

Schumacher was now beginning to look threatening to the second Renault of Fisichella and this was significant for the Constructors' Championship—if the Ferraris could finish 1st and 2nd and the Renaults only 3rd and 6th, the two teams would finish equal on points but with Ferrari in front on race victories. With 15 laps to go, Schumacher was under half a second behind Fisichella as they came across the line with Räikkönen only a few seconds further in front. The Renault seemed able to match the Ferrari's impressive straight-line speed and Schumacher was unable to overtake as easily as he had done with other cars. A thrilling battle ensued as Fisichella defended valiantly, but on lap 62 he braked too late into Turn 1 and his Renault took to the grass, allowing Schumacher to gain in position. Fisichella was only just able to rejoin in front of Barrichello.

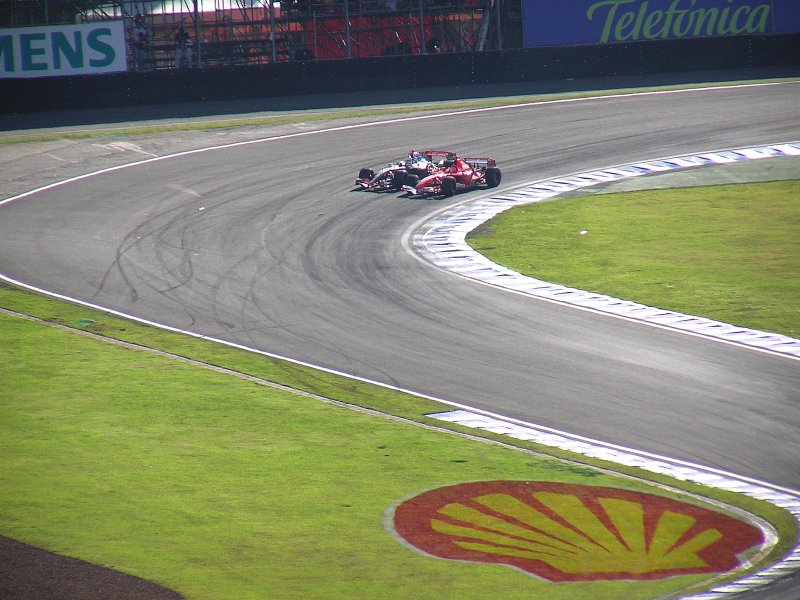
Michael Schumacher squeezes past Kimi Räikkönen to take fourth place

Schumacher then closed on 4th placed Räikkönen who had been dropping back slightly from Button and Alonso. On lap 64, Nick Heidfeld's race was over as his BMW's rear suspension failed at the end of the main straight. Waved yellow flags in Turn 1 prevented Schumacher from overtaking Räikkönen on the usual overtaking spot, but Räikkönen made a slight mistake in the hairpin turn 10 and Schumacher pulled even with the Finn in the inferior McLaren. Schumacher was on the outside for the next turn, however, and had to back off, losing some ground in the process.

With four laps to go, Schumacher was ready to attack again, but Räikkönen defended brilliantly against superior machinery by taking the inside line for the first turn. The following lap, Schumacher was even closer, drafting behind the McLaren on the main straight. Räikkönen tried to fend off the charging Ferrari and again took to the inside, but this time Schumacher was so much quicker he managed to pull alongside, finding just enough space between the McLaren and the pit wall. The two cars went through turn one side by side, but Räikkönen finally had to give way into turn 2 as Schumacher forced him onto the dirty line of the circuit.

==== Finish and post-race ====
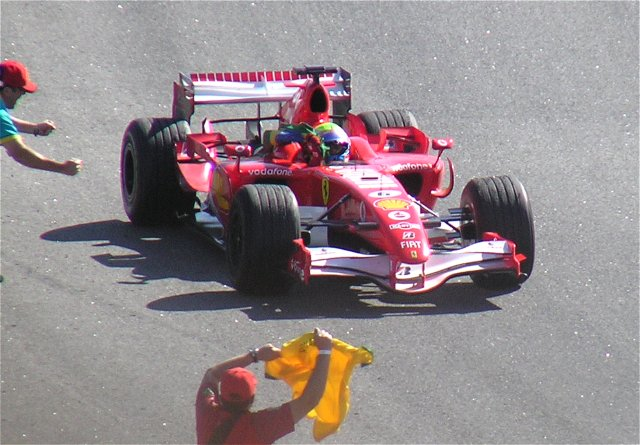
Massa received a Brazilian flag after winning the race

Schumacher continued to chase down Alonso and Button, setting a new fastest lap (1:12.1) on the penultimate lap, but he was unable to catch them in time and Alonso made himself and Renault champions by finishing second behind the elated Felipe Massa, who became the first Brazilian winner in São Paulo since the late Ayrton Senna in 1993. Giancarlo Fisichella finished sixth to help Renault clinch their second Constructors' Championship.

After finishing the race, winner Felipe Massa stopped just after the "S do Senna" to receive a Brazilian flag from a fan, this action had broken Article 154 of the FIA Sporting Regulations, stating that "After receiving the end-of-race signal all cars must proceed on the circuit directly to the post race parc fermé without stopping, without overtaking (unless clearly necessary), without receiving any object whatsoever and without any assistance (except that of the marshals if necessary)." In practice, this should have meant Massa being punished, although the rule itself was never put in place.

At the end-of-season FIA Gala in December 2006 the promoters of the 2006 Brazilian Grand Prix received the Race Promoters' Trophy for their work in publicising the event.

It was also the last race for a V10-engined car to date as Scuderia Toro Rosso eventually switched to Ferrari 056 2.4-litre V8 engines from 2007 season.

== Friday drivers ==
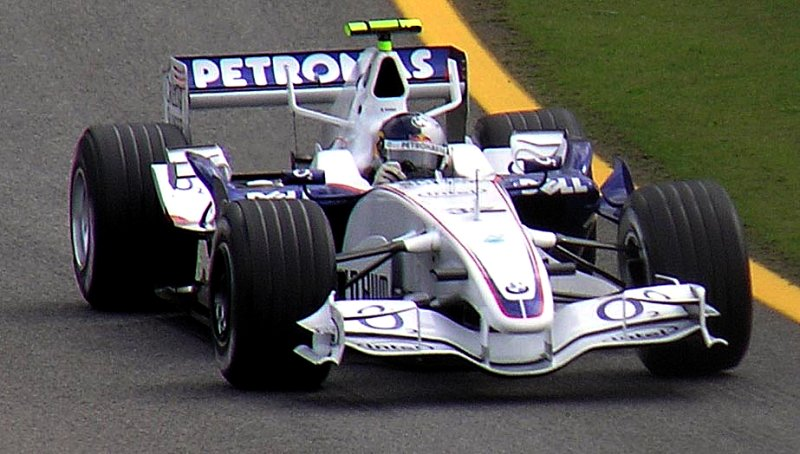
Sebastian Vettel on third-driver duties for BMW Sauber during Friday practice

The bottom six teams in the 2005 Constructors' Championship, plus the Super Aguri team, were entitled to run a third car in free practice on Friday. These drivers did not compete in qualifying or the race.

Constructor	Nat	Driver
Williams-Cosworth	(Austria)	Alexander Wurz
Honda	(United Kingdom)	Anthony Davidson
Red Bull-Ferrari	(Germany)	Michael Ammermüller
BMW Sauber	(Germany)	Sebastian Vettel
Spyker MF1-Toyota	(Venezuela)	Ernesto Viso
Toro Rosso-Cosworth	(Switzerland)	Neel Jani
Super Aguri-Honda	(France)	Franck Montagny

== Classification ==
=== Qualifying ===
Pos.	No.	Driver	Constructor	Q1	Q2	Q3	Grid
1	6	(Brazil) Felipe Massa	Ferrari	1:10.643	1:10.775	1:10.680	1
2	3	(Finland) Kimi Räikkönen	McLaren-Mercedes	1:12.035	1:11.386	1:11.299	2
3	8	(Italy) Jarno Trulli	Toyota	1:11.885	1:11.343	1:11.328	3
4	1	(Spain) Fernando Alonso	Renault	1:11.791	1:11.148	1:11.567	4
5	11	(Brazil) Rubens Barrichello	Honda	1:12.017	1:11.578	1:11.619	5
6	2	(Italy) Giancarlo Fisichella	Renault	1:12.042	1:11.461	1:11.629	6
7	7	(Germany) Ralf Schumacher	Toyota	1:11.713	1:11.550	1:11.695	7
8	16	(Germany) Nick Heidfeld	BMW Sauber	1:12.307	1:11.648	1:11.882	8
9	17	(Poland) Robert Kubica	BMW Sauber	1:12.040	1:11.589	1:12.131	9
10	5	(Germany) Michael Schumacher	Ferrari	1:11.565	1:10.313	No time^{2}	10
11	9	(Australia) Mark Webber	Williams-Cosworth	1:11.973	1:11.650		11
12	4	(Spain) Pedro de la Rosa	McLaren-Mercedes	1:11.825	1:11.658		12
13	10	(Germany) Nico Rosberg	Williams-Cosworth	1:11.974	1:11.679		13
14	12	(United Kingdom) Jenson Button	Honda	1:12.085	1:11.742		14
15	15	(Netherlands) Robert Doornbos	Red Bull-Ferrari	1:12.530	1:12.591		22^{3}
16	20	(Italy) Vitantonio Liuzzi	Toro Rosso-Cosworth	1:12.855	1:12.861		15
17	21	(United States) Scott Speed	Toro Rosso-Cosworth	1:12.856			16
18	19	(Netherlands) Christijan Albers	Spyker MF1-Toyota	1:13.138			17
19	14	(United Kingdom) David Coulthard	Red Bull-Ferrari	1:13.249			18
20	22	(Japan) Takuma Sato	Super Aguri-Honda	1:13.269			19
21	23	(Japan) Sakon Yamamoto	Super Aguri-Honda	1:13.357			20
22	18	(Portugal) Tiago Monteiro	Spyker MF1-Toyota	No time^{1}			21

Notes

- ^1 – Tiago Monteiro did not set a time in Q1 after spinning prematurely and leaving his car stranded on the track.
- ^2 – Michael Schumacher did not set a time in Q3 due to fuel pressure problems.
- ^3 – Robert Doornbos received a 10-place grid penalty for an engine change.

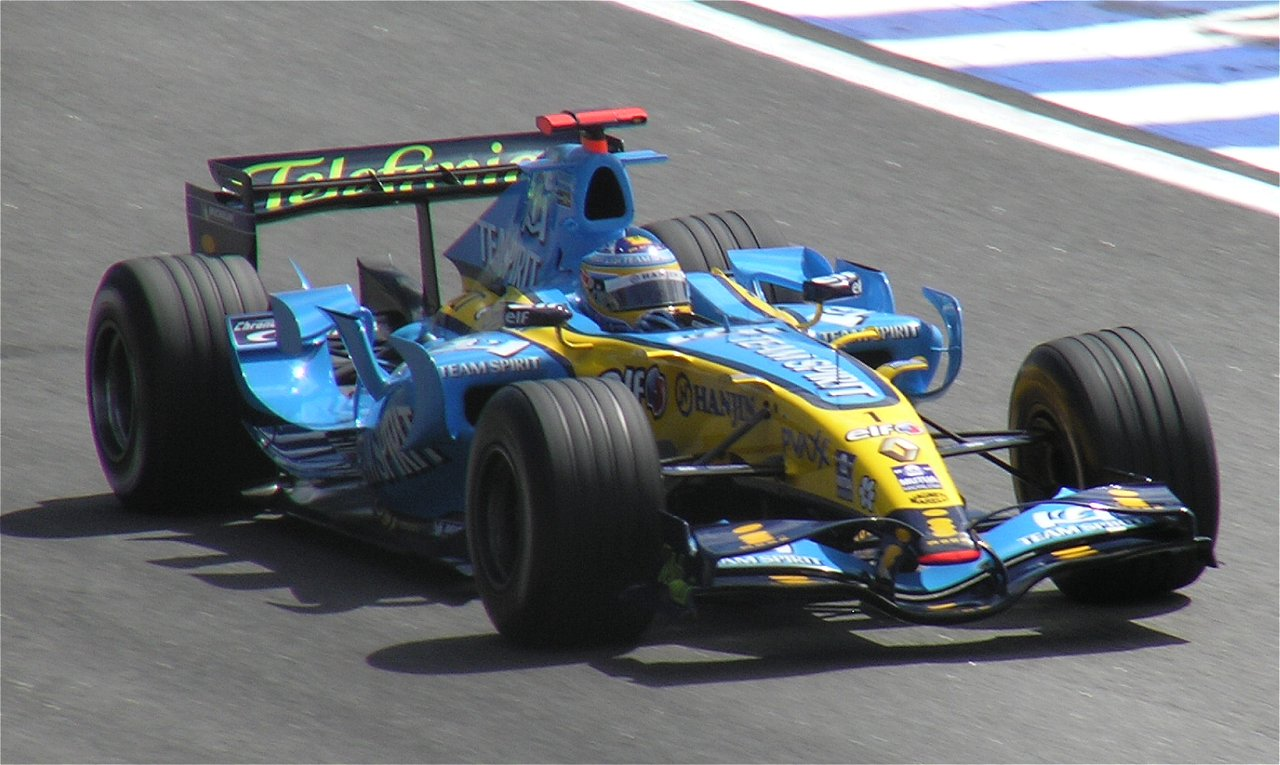
Alonso on the way to his second Drivers' Championship.

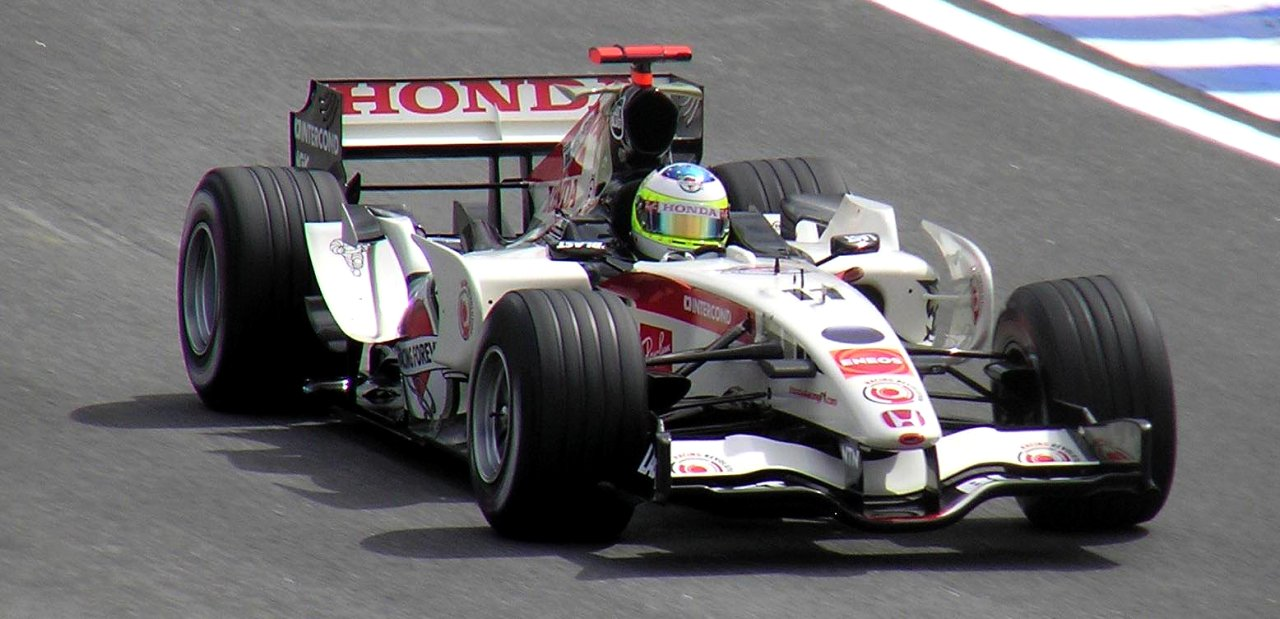
This was also Rubens Barrichello's home race, for which he sported a special helmet design.

=== Race ===
Pos.	No.	Driver	Constructor	Tyre	Lap	Time/Retired	Grid	Points
1	6	(Brazil) Felipe Massa	Ferrari	B	71	1:31:53.751	1	10
2	1	(Spain) Fernando Alonso	Renault	MI	71	+ 18.658	4	8
3	12	(United Kingdom) Jenson Button	Honda	MI	71	+ 19.394	14	6
4	5	(Germany) Michael Schumacher	Ferrari	B	71	+ 24.094	10	5
5	3	(Finland) Kimi Räikkönen	McLaren-Mercedes	MI	71	+ 28.503	2	4
6	2	(Italy) Giancarlo Fisichella	Renault	MI	71	+ 30.287	6	3
7	11	(Brazil) Rubens Barrichello	Honda	MI	71	+ 40.294	5	2
8	4	(Spain) Pedro de la Rosa	McLaren-Mercedes	MI	71	+ 52.068	12	1
9	17	(Poland) Robert Kubica	BMW Sauber	MI	71	+ 1:07.642	9	
10	22	(Japan) Takuma Sato	Super Aguri-Honda	B	70	+ 1 Lap	19	
11	21	(United States) Scott Speed	Toro Rosso-Cosworth	MI	70	+ 1 Lap	16	
12	15	(Netherlands) Robert Doornbos	Red Bull-Ferrari	MI	70	+ 1 Lap	22	
13	20	(Italy) Vitantonio Liuzzi	Toro Rosso-Cosworth	MI	70	+ 1 Lap	15	
14	19	(Netherlands) Christijan Albers	Spyker MF1-Toyota	B	70	+ 1 Lap	17	
15	18	(Portugal) Tiago Monteiro	Spyker MF1-Toyota	B	69	+ 2 Laps	21	
16	23	(Japan) Sakon Yamamoto	Super Aguri-Honda	B	69	+ 2 Laps	20	
17	16	(Germany) Nick Heidfeld	BMW Sauber	MI	63	Accident	8	
Ret	14	(United Kingdom) David Coulthard	Red Bull-Ferrari	MI	14	Gearbox	18	
Ret	8	(Italy) Jarno Trulli	Toyota	B	10	Suspension	3	
Ret	7	(Germany) Ralf Schumacher	Toyota	B	9	Suspension	7	
Ret	9	(Australia) Mark Webber	Williams-Cosworth	B	1	Collision damage	11	
Ret	10	(Germany) Nico Rosberg	Williams-Cosworth	B	0	Accident	13	

== Final championship standings ==
Drivers' Championship standings

Pos.	Driver	Points
1	(Spain) Fernando Alonso*	134
2	(Germany) Michael Schumacher	121
3	(Brazil) Felipe Massa	80
4	(Italy) Giancarlo Fisichella	72
5	(Finland) Kimi Räikkönen	65

Constructors' Championship standings

Pos.	Constructor	Points
1	(France) Renault*	206
2	(Italy) Ferrari	201
3	(United Kingdom) McLaren-Mercedes	110
4	(Japan) Honda	86
5	(Germany) BMW Sauber	36

- Note: Only the top five positions are included for both sets of standings.
- Bold text and an asterisk indicates the 2006 World Champions.

Previous race: 2006 Japanese Grand Prix	FIA Formula One World Championship; 2006 season	Next race: 2007 Australian Grand Prix
Previous race: 2005 Brazilian Grand Prix	Brazilian Grand Prix	Next race: 2007 Brazilian Grand Prix
Awards
Preceded by 2005 Monaco Grand Prix	Formula One Promotional Trophy for Race Promoter; 2006	Succeeded by 2007 United States Grand Prix
