= Honda RA106 =

Formula One racing car

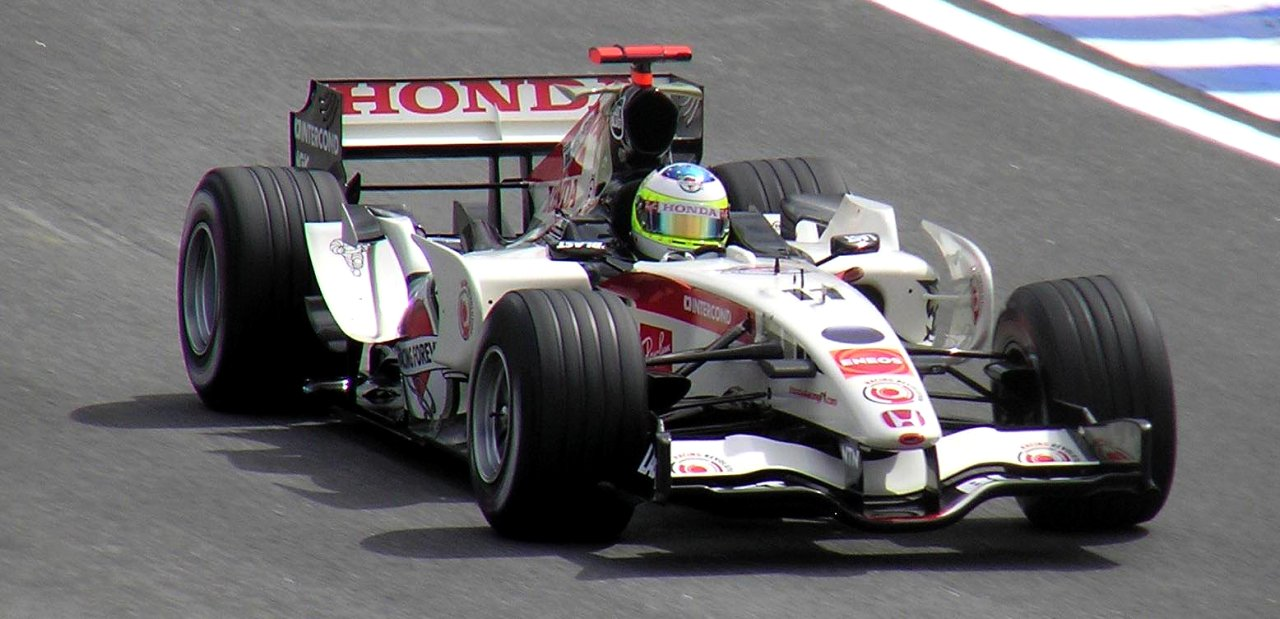
- Rubens Barrichello driving the RA106 at the Brazilian Grand Prix
- Category: Formula One
- Constructor: Honda
- Designers: Geoff Willis (Technical Director); Gary Savage (Deputy Technical Director); Kevin Taylor (Chief Designer); Willem Toet (Chief Engineer, Aerodynamics and Design); Mark Ellis (Chief Engineer, Vehicle Performance); Ian Wright (Chief Engineer, Vehicle Dynamics); Russell Cooley (Chief Engineer, Transmission and Mechanical); Simon Lacey (Head of Aerodynamics); Mariano Alperin (Chief Aerodynamicist); Kazuo Sakurahara (Engine Project Leader)
- Predecessor: BAR 007 - BAR Engineering; Honda RA301 - Honda branded Honda RA302 - Honda branded
- Successor: RA107

Technical specifications
- Chassis: Carbon fibre and honeycomb composite structure
- Suspension (front): Wishbone and pushrod activated torsion springs and rockers; mechanical anti-roll bar
- Suspension (rear): Wishbone and pushrod activated torsion springs and rockers; mechanical anti-roll bar
- Length: 4,675 mm (184.1 in)
- Width: 1,800 mm (70.9 in)
- Height: 950 mm (37.4 in)
- Axle track: Front : 1,460 mm (57.5 in); Rear : 1,420 mm (55.9 in)
- Wheelbase: 3,145 mm (123.8 in)
- Engine: Honda RA806E 2,395 cc (146.2 cu in) V8 (90°). Naturally-aspirated, mid-mounted.
- Transmission: Honda 7 forward speeds + 1 reverse semi-automatic
- Power: 650-775 hp @ 19,500 rpm
- Fuel: ENEOS
- Lubricants: ENEOS
- Brakes: Caliper : alcon Pad and Disc : Brembo / Hitco
- Tyres: Michelin; BBS Wheels

Competition history
- Notable entrants: Lucky Strike Honda Racing F1 Team
- Notable drivers: 11. (Brazil) Rubens Barrichello; 12. (United Kingdom) Jenson Button
- Debut: 2006 Bahrain Grand Prix
- First win: 2006 Hungarian Grand Prix
- Last win: 2006 Hungarian Grand Prix
- Last event: 2006 Brazilian Grand Prix
Races	Wins	Podiums	Poles	F/Laps
18	1	3	1	0
- Constructors' Championships: 0
- Drivers' Championships: 0

The Honda RA106 (originally known as the BAR 008) was the car with which the Honda team competed in the 2006 Formula One season.

== History ==
It was driven by Rubens Barrichello, who joined from Ferrari, and Jenson Button, who had spent three seasons with the team as British American Racing. The year marked the first time Honda had competed as a full team since 1968; since then it had only competed as an engine supplier until taking over BAR completely in late 2005. Although the year was a significant improvement from Honda's performance in 1968 and BAR's performance in 2005, Honda was unable to challenge for the world championship after impressive winter testing form. The car was quick in qualifying but less so in the races. A performance slump mid-season also led to the team parting company with the car's designer, Geoff Willis, and he was replaced by the inexperienced Shuhei Nakamoto.

However, things improved from the German GP, culminating in Button's first F1 win in Hungary. Button was generally the stronger driver throughout the season, and it was felt that he deserved to get Honda's first win in their F1 return.

Honda finished the season strongly with a run of points finishes, culminating in a third-place finish for Button at the final race in Brazil. They also successfully introduced their 2007-spec engine before the season was over.

The team eventually finished fourth in the Constructors' Championship, with 86 points.

The RA106 formed the basis of the Super Aguri SA07.

The RA106 was also the last Honda-powered car to achieve a Grand Prix victory until Max Verstappen won the 2019 Austrian Grand Prix in the Red Bull Racing RB15.

== Sponsorship and livery ==
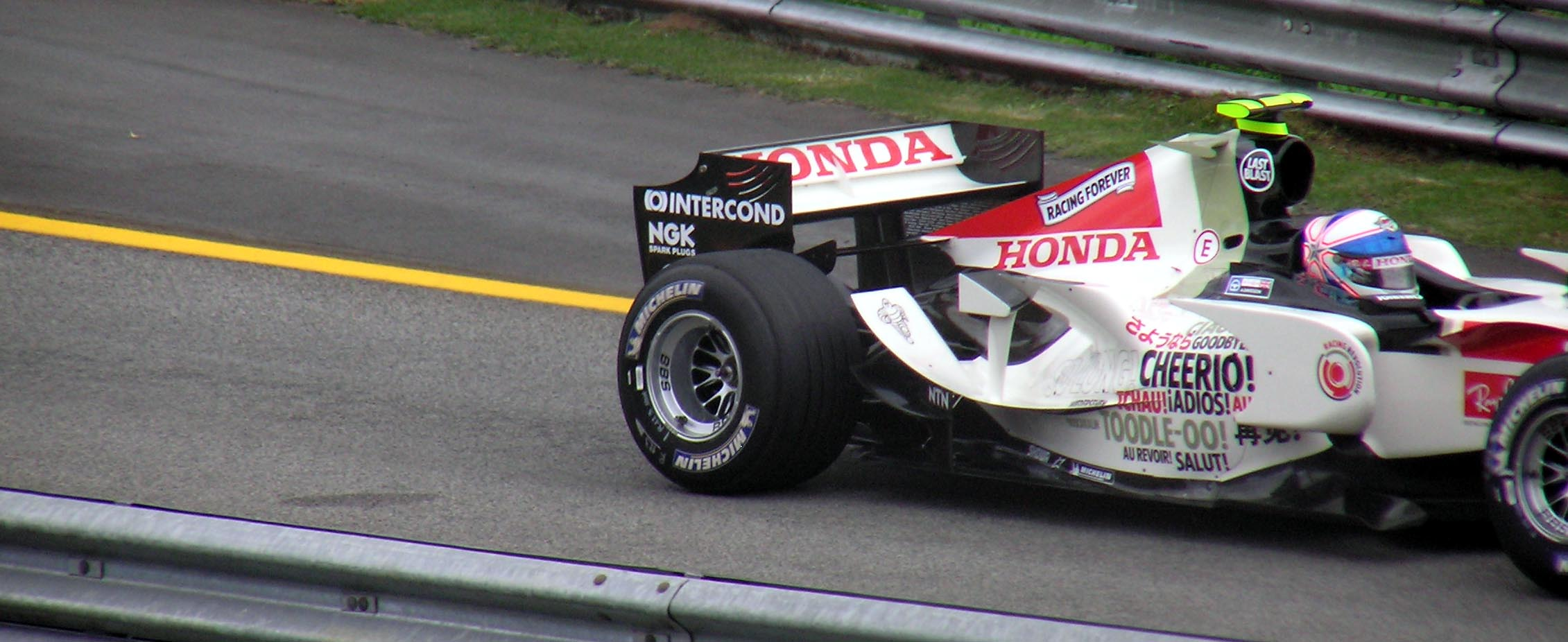
At the Brazilian Grand Prix farewell messages to BAT in Davidson's car.

The team's former owners British American Tobacco continued to sponsor the team through the Lucky Strike and 555 brands.

Honda used the Lucky Strike logos, except at the San Marino, European, Spanish, British, Canadian, United States, French, German, Hungarian, Turkish, Italian and Brazilian Grands Prix; in these competitions they were replaced with the "Racing Revolution" logo. In China, it had 555 logos on the car in place of Lucky Strike. In Brazil, they used the slogans "Racing Forever" and "Last Blast" on the colors as a tribute to main sponsor British American Tobacco in honor of the last race. The side pods of the car Davidson was driving had "Bye bye" and "goodbye" written in multiple languages daily.

In Turkey, the car ran with a special livery that coincided with their collaboration with Petrol Ofisi.

== Drivers' helmets ==
Jenson Button wore a special helmet at the British Grand Prix to cheer on the England team at the 2006 FIFA World Cup in Berlin. A red and white St. George's Cross has been added to the helmet, with the word "England" written through it.

== Gallery ==
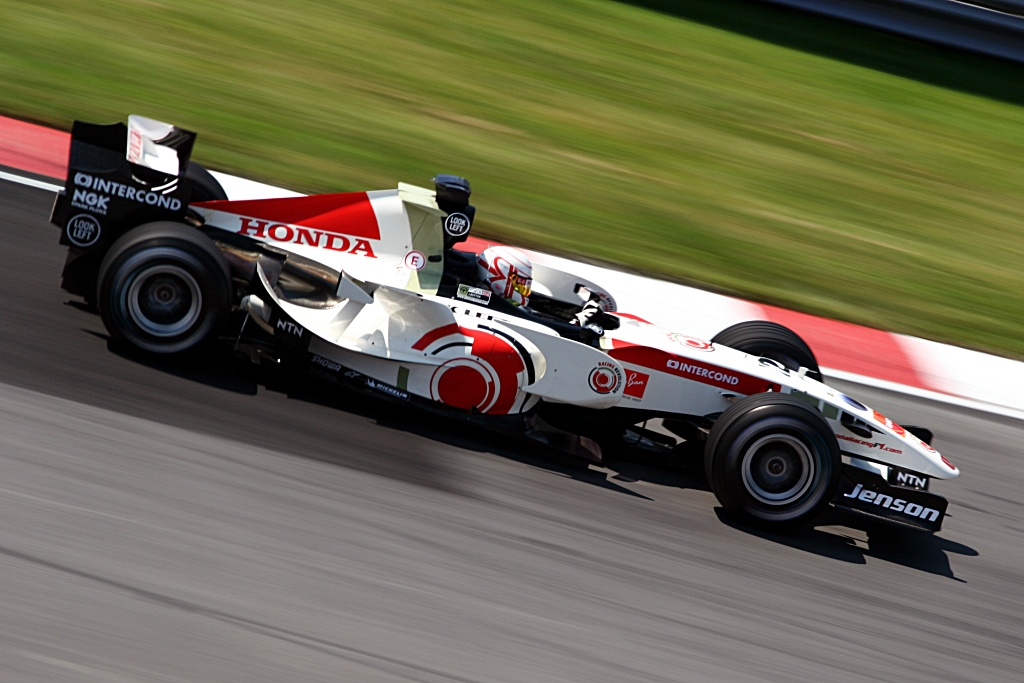
Jenson Button driving the RA106 at the 2006 Canadian GP.

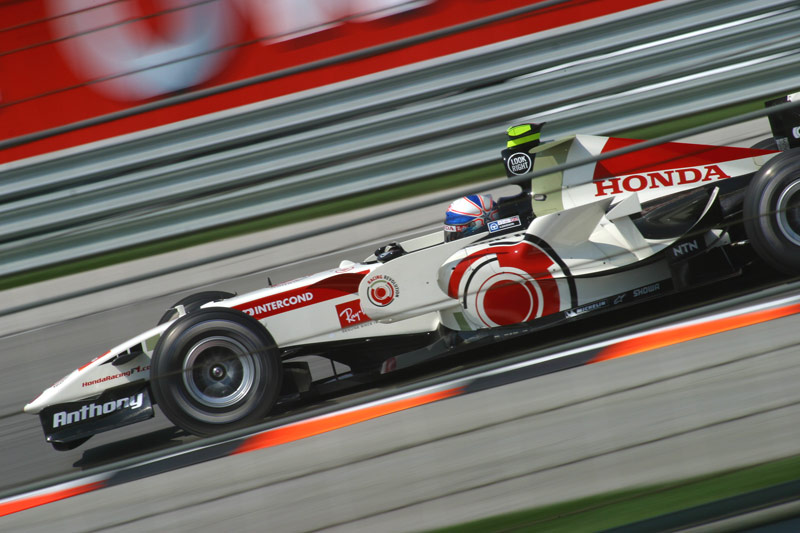
Anthony Davidson driving the RA106 at the 2006 US GP.

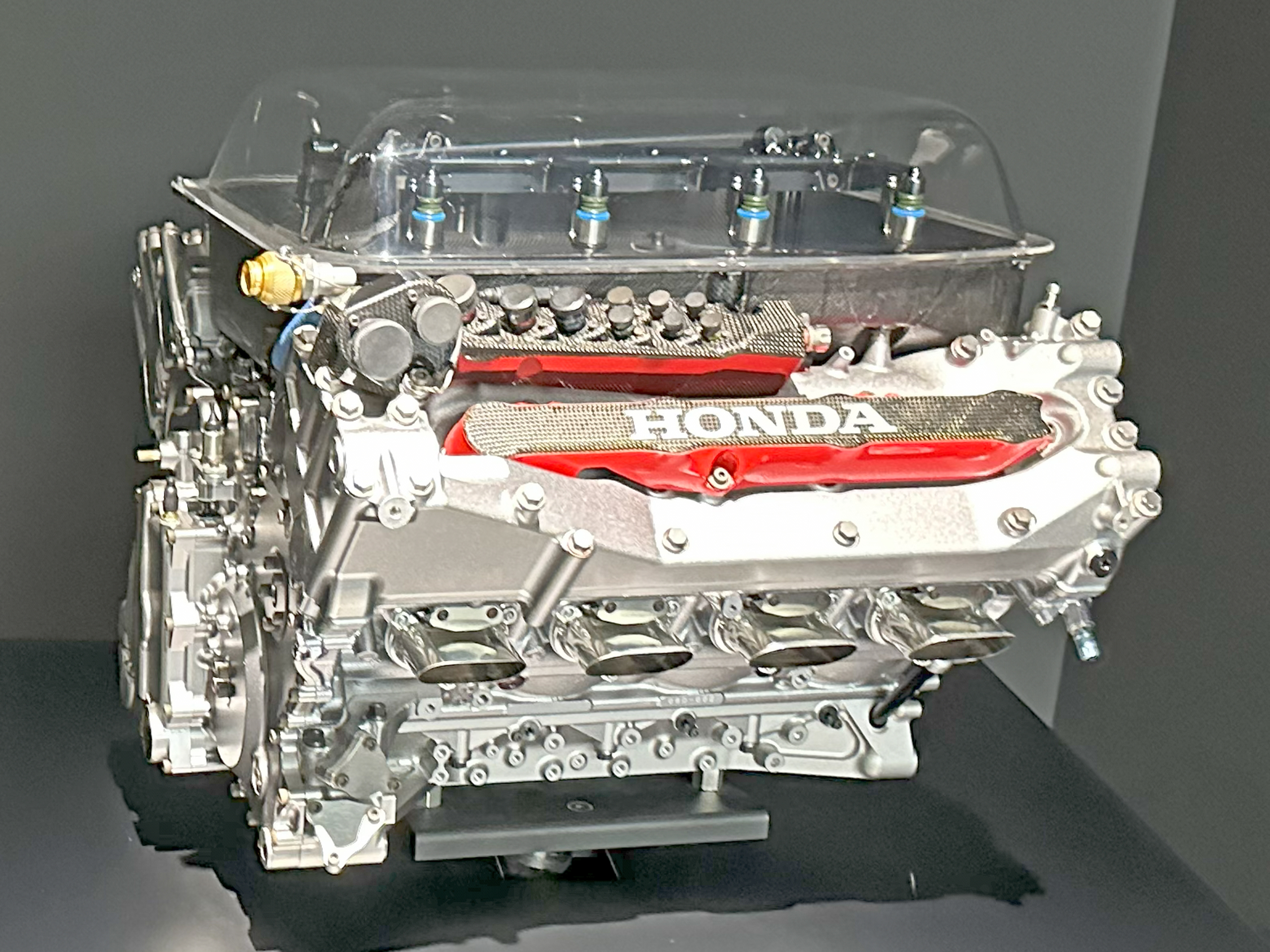
The RA806E engine that powered the RA106

== Complete Formula One results ==
(key) (results in bold indicate pole position)

Year	Entrant	Engine	Tyres	Drivers	1	2	3	4	5	6	7	8	9	10	11	12	13	14	15	16	17	18	Points	WCC
2006	Lucky Strike Honda Racing F1 Team	Honda V8	**MI**		BHR	MAL	AUS	SMR	EUR	ESP	MON	GBR	CAN	USA	FRA	GER	HUN	TUR	ITA	CHN	JPN	BRA	86	4th
2006	Lucky Strike Honda Racing F1 Team	Honda V8	**MI**	(Brazil) Rubens Barrichello	15	10	7	10	5	7	4	10	Ret	6	Ret	Ret	4	8	6	6	12	7	86	4th
2006	Lucky Strike Honda Racing F1 Team	Honda V8	**MI**	(United Kingdom) Jenson Button	4	3	**10**^{†}	7	Ret	6	11	Ret	9	Ret	Ret	4	1	4	5	4	4	3	86	4th
