= Honda RA107 =

Formula One racing car

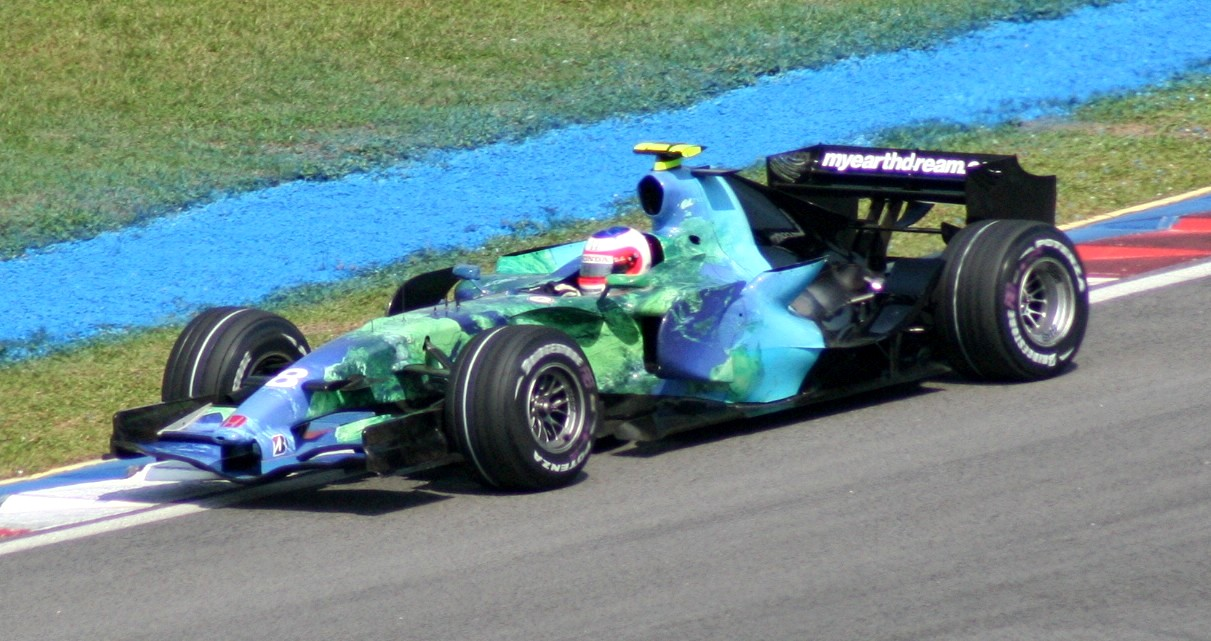
- Rubens Barrichello driving the RA107 at the 2007 Malaysian Grand Prix
- Category: Formula One
- Constructor: Honda
- Designers: Shuhei Nakamoto (Senior Technical Director); Gary Savage (Deputy Technical Director); Jacky Eeckelaert (Engineering Director); Kevin Taylor (Chief Designer); Mark Ellis (Chief Engineer, Vehicle Performance); Ian Wright (Chief Engineer, Vehicle Dynamics); Russell Cooley (Chief Engineer, Transmission and Mechanical); Mariano Alperin (Head of Aerodynamics); Kazuo Sakurahara (Engine Project Leader)
- Predecessor: RA106
- Successor: RA108

Technical specifications
- Chassis: Moulded carbon fibre and honeycomb composite monocoque
- Suspension (front): Double wishbone with pushrod-activated torsion springs and rockers, Showa dampers
- Suspension (rear): Double wishbone with pushrod-activated torsion springs and rockers, Showa dampers
- Length: 4,700 mm (185.0 in)
- Width: 1,800 mm (70.9 in)
- Height: 950 mm (37.4 in)
- Axle track: Front : 1,460 mm (57.5 in); Rear : 1,420 mm (55.9 in)
- Wheelbase: 3,165 mm (124.6 in)
- Engine: Honda RA807E 2,400 cc (146.5 cu in) V8 (90°). naturally-aspirated, mid-mounted.
- Transmission: Honda 7 speeds sequential semi-automatic
- Power: 700–775 hp @ 19,000 rpm
- Fuel: ENEOS
- Lubricants: ENEOS
- Brakes: Caliper: alcon Disc: Hitco
- Tyres: Bridgestone Potenza; BBS Wheels

Competition history
- Notable entrants: Honda Racing F1 Team
- Notable drivers: 7. (United Kingdom) Jenson Button; 8. (Brazil) Rubens Barrichello
- Debut: 2007 Australian Grand Prix
- Last event: 2007 Brazilian Grand Prix
Races	Wins	Podiums	Poles	F/Laps
17	0	0	0	0
- Constructors' Championships: 0
- Drivers' Championships: 0

The Honda RA107 is a Formula One racing car with which Honda Racing F1 contested the 2007 Formula One season. A modified version of the RA107, renamed the Super Aguri SA08 was used by Super Aguri in the 2008 Formula One season. The RA107 was the first Formula One car designed under former HRC motorcycle designer, Shuhei Nakamoto.

The car scored a best result of 5th at the Chinese Grand Prix and finished 8th in the constructors' championship. It featured a livery depicting planet Earth against a black background of space in order to raise environmental awareness, for which Honda won two awards at the 2007 Green Awards.

== Launch information ==
It was revealed to the public on 25 February 2007 at the Circuit de Catalunya in Spain. The RA107 was launched with the interim winter testing livery before the final colours were unveiled on 26 February.

The 'livery launch' for the RA107 took place at the Natural History Museum in London and showed a completely new take on the look of a Formula One car. Honda's 2007 paint scheme did not use sponsorship branding but instead is focused on Honda's environmental desires. The car has been dubbed by some as 'The Honda Earth car' and the car's livery depicts the planet Earth against the black background of space, with the only logos on the car being the Type R Honda 'H', and the Bridgestone logo, all at the very front of the car. On the rear wing is the web address of environmental awareness website My Earth Dream, launching on 27 February 2007. This is the first time in 30 years that a Grand Prix car has gone to the grid without a sponsored permanent livery. At the end of the year Honda were awarded with an environmental award for the "Earth Car" campaign.

Along with the launch of the new theme, a number of new sponsors were named at the launch event. These included two large global brands, Universal Music and Gatorade, as well as a large number of other companies including Fila, IBM, Instron, Oliver Sweeney, Perkin Elmer, Showa Denko, TUV and GF Agie Charmilles.

== 2007 season ==
The team's form in pre-season testing was patchy, and it seemed the car was unable to produce the sort of results the car's predecessor had done.

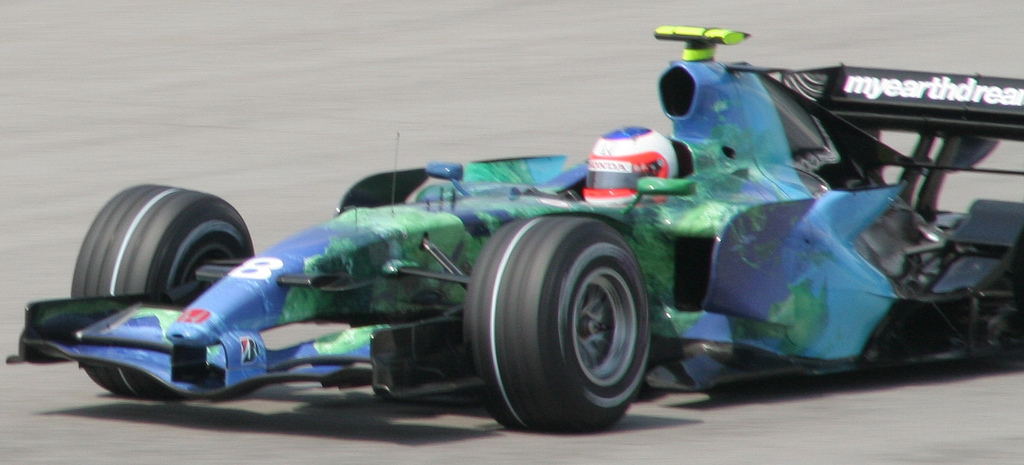
Rubens Barrichello driving the RA107 at the 2007 Malaysian Grand Prix, with its characteristic "Earth" livery.

The RA107's lack of pace was evident at the season-opening Australian Grand Prix in Melbourne, with Jenson Button and Rubens Barrichello qualifying 14th and 17th respectively (behind the 'customer' Super Aguri team, whose car, the Super Aguri SA07, was effectively an update of the previous year's Honda, the RA106). Barrichello finished the race in 11th place, with Button in 15th after receiving a drive-through penalty for speeding in the pit lane.

The team did not score any points in the following six races, but more positively, the car's reliability was proving to be good. The team did have chances to gain points, however, at Monaco and Canada. In Monaco, Honda had their most competitive race up to that point but they were on the wrong strategy and required to pit an extra time, resigning them to a pointless race. At Canada, Barrichello could have finished as high as 3rd but was again on the wrong strategy which required him to pit an extra time dropping him to 12th.

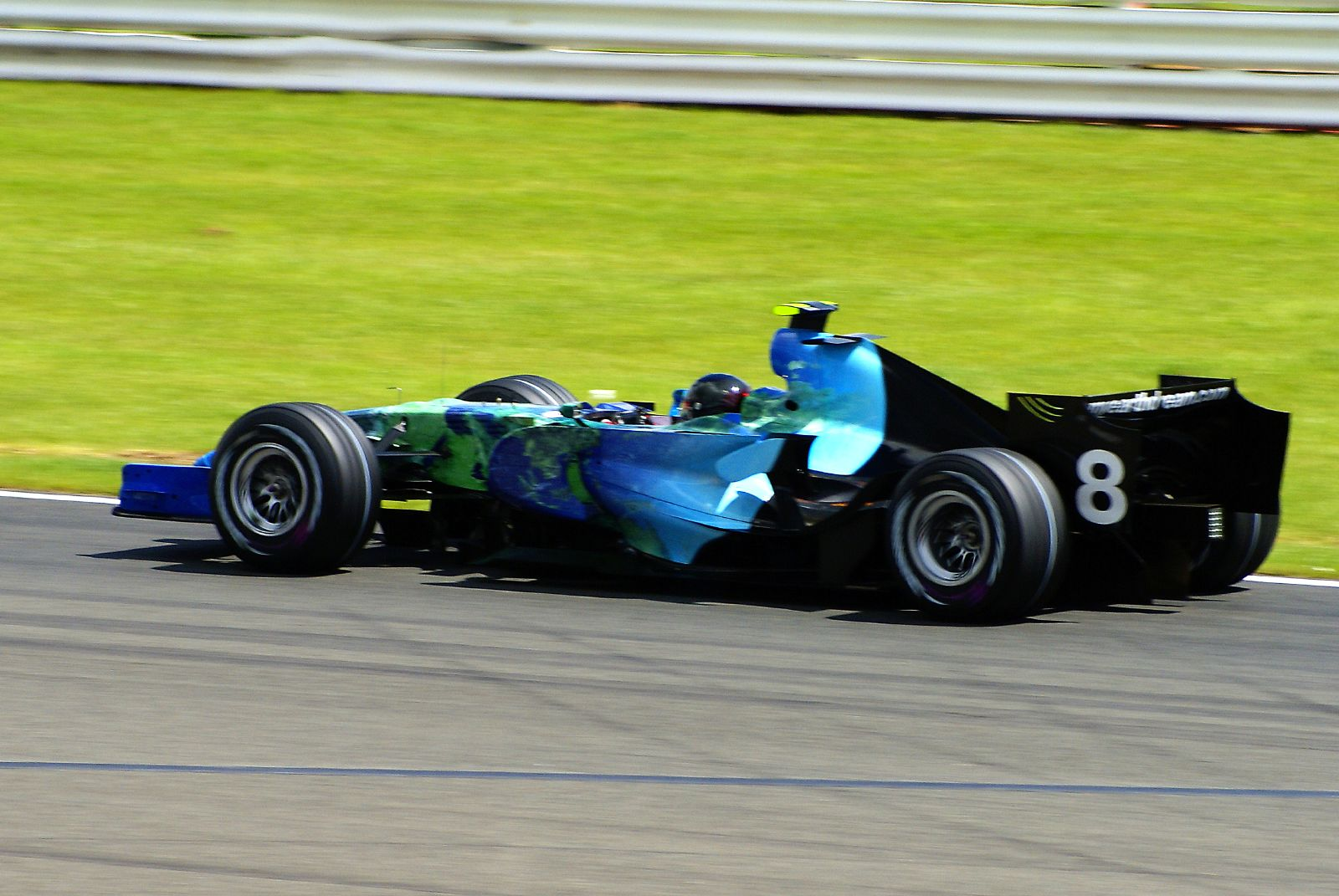
Barrichello driving the RA107 at the 2007 British Grand Prix.

At the French Grand Prix Button finished 8th, finally earning his and his team's first point of the season. Barrichello finished 9th in the following British Grand Prix, scoring his best result of the season. At the European Grand Prix, Jenson Button had had a strong first lap before the rain arrived and was up to 4th place before he aquaplaned off the circuit at the end of the pit straight, as did five other drivers.

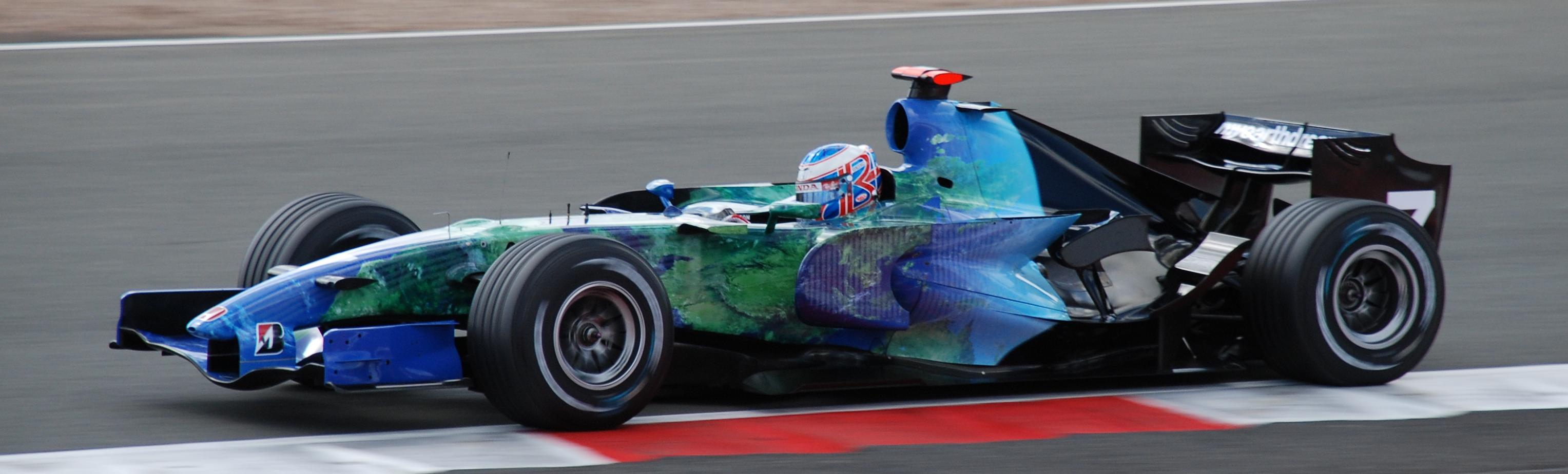
Jenson Button driving the RA107 at the 2007 British Grand Prix.

The team scored points again at the Italian Grand Prix, as Button finished 8th to score his second point of the season. At the next round in Belgium both drivers were running out of the points before Button retired with hydraulic issues, while Barrichello finished 13th. In Fuji, the cars finished 10th and 11th in the wet conditions.

In Shanghai, Button put on a remarkable display of driving in the wet and scored the RA107's best result of the season with a strong 5th place, finally moving Honda ahead of Super Aguri in the championship standings. At Interlagos however, both cars retired with overheating engines due to the very hot weather in the race. Button finished the season 15th overall with six points, while for the first time in his career, Barrichello failed to score points during the season. Honda finished the season 8th in the constructors' championship.

The RA107 ended the 2007 season in 9th place (later 8th due to McLaren's disqualification) with only 6 points - the worst season for Brackley-based team since 2002 season and also first time the Brackley-based team had not scored a podium finish since the 2003 season.

== Complete Formula One results ==
(key) (results in bold indicate pole position)

Year	Team	Engine	Tyres	Drivers	1	2	3	4	5	6	7	8	9	10	11	12	13	14	15	16	17	Points	WCC
2007	Honda	Honda V8	**B**		AUS	MAL	BHR	ESP	MON	CAN	USA	FRA	GBR	EUR	HUN	TUR	ITA	BEL	JPN	CHN	BRA	**6**	**8th**
2007	Honda	Honda V8	**B**	(United Kingdom) Jenson Button	15	12	Ret	12	11	Ret	12	8	10	Ret	Ret	13	8	Ret	11	5	Ret	**6**	**8th**
2007	Honda	Honda V8	**B**	(Brazil) Rubens Barrichello	11	11	13	10	10	12	Ret	11	9	11	18	17	10	13	10	15	Ret	**6**	**8th**
