= 1979 in Finland =

- Decades: 1950s; 1960s; 1970s; 1980s; 1990s
- See also: Other events of 1979; Timeline of Finnish history

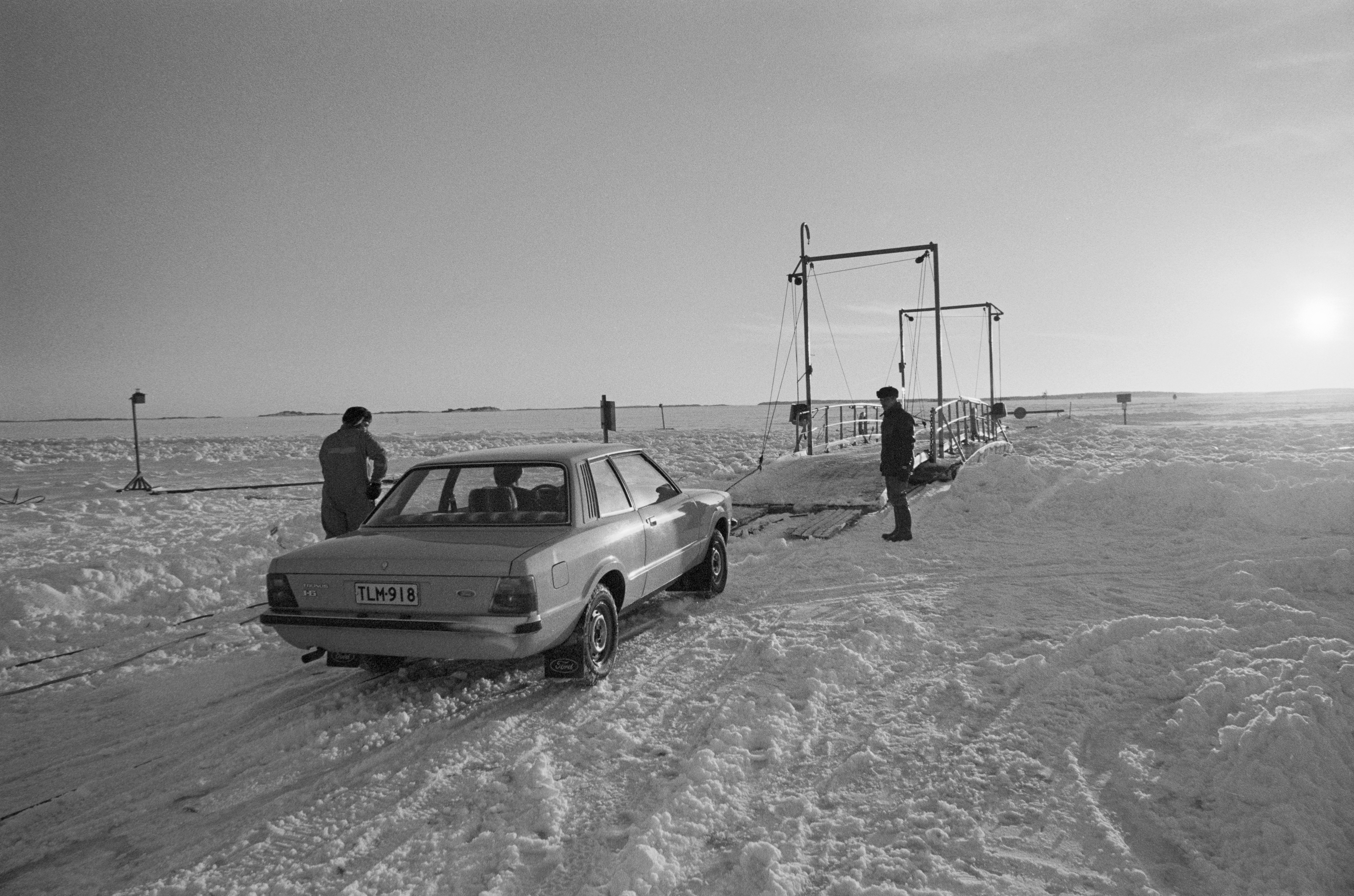
A Ford Taunus about to cross a sea lane by a ferry bridge in the Turku archipelago in winter 1979.

The following lists events that happened during 1979 in Finland.

== Incumbents ==
- President: Urho Kekkonen
- Prime Minister: Kalevi Sorsa (until 26 May); Mauno Koivisto (from 26 May)

== Events ==
- 10 October – The Olkiluoto Nuclear Power Plant began operations in Eurajoki, Satakunta, Finland.

== Births ==
- 1 February – Aino-Kaisa Saarinen, cross-country skier
- 19 February – Mariska, rapper, singer and songwriter
- 30 March – Laura Huhtasaari, politician
- 1 April – Mikko Franck, orchestral conductor
- 8 April – Alexi Laiho, rock musician (Children of Bodom) (d. 2020)
- 23 April – Lauri Ylönen, singer (The Rasmus)
- 26 April – Janne Wirman, musician (Warmen)
- 6 April – Janne Wirman, keyboardist (Children of Bodom)
- 25 May – Mikko Härkin, metal keyboardist
- 27 May – Laura Österberg Kalmari, footballer
- 18 July – Jaska Raatikainen, drummer (Children of Bodom)
- 31 July – Kai Mykkänen, politician
- 30 September – Juho Kuosmanen, film director and screenwriter
- 17 October – Kimi Räikkönen, racing driver, 2007 Formula 1 world champion
- 27 November – Teemu Tainio, footballer and manager
- 5 December – Niklas Hagman, ice hockey player

== Deaths ==
- 26 August – Mika Waltari, author (b. 1908)
