= 2007 Japanese Grand Prix =

Coordinates: 35°22′18″N 138°55′36″E

Race 15 of 17 in the 2007 Formula One World Championship
← Previous race	Next race →
- Fuji Speedway

Race details
- Date: September 30, 2007
- Official name: 2007 Formula 1 Fuji Television Japanese Grand Prix
- Location: Fuji Speedway, Oyama, Sunto District, Shizuoka, Japan
- Course: Permanent racing facility
- Course length: 4.563 km (2.835 miles)
- Distance: 67 laps, 305.416 km (189.777 miles)
- Weather: Very heavy rain

Pole position
Driver	(United Kingdom) Lewis Hamilton	McLaren-Mercedes
- Time: 1:25.368

Fastest lap
Driver	(United Kingdom) Lewis Hamilton	McLaren-Mercedes
- Time: 1:28.193 on lap 27

Podium
First	(United Kingdom) Lewis Hamilton	McLaren-Mercedes
Second	(Finland) Heikki Kovalainen	Renault
Third	(Finland) Kimi Räikkönen	Ferrari

The 2007 Japanese Grand Prix (officially the 2007 Formula 1 Fuji Television Japanese Grand Prix) was a Formula One motor race held on 30 September 2007 at the Fuji Speedway, Oyama, Shizuoka. The 67-lap race was the fifteenth round of the 2007 FIA Formula One World Championship. It was held at the recently revised track in very heavy rain and misty conditions. For the previous 20 years, the Japanese Grand Prix had been held at Suzuka Circuit, but at this race it returned to Fuji for the first time since 1977. The very wet race was won by McLaren driver Lewis Hamilton, who also took pole position and the fastest lap of the race. Heikki Kovalainen achieved his first podium, by finishing second for the Renault team (Renault's only podium that year), whilst Kimi Räikkönen finished in third for Ferrari. Adrian Sutil scored his first point and Spyker's first and only point by finishing ninth and being promoted to eighth after the race following a penalty for Vitantonio Liuzzi.

As a consequence of the race, Hamilton extended his lead in the World Drivers' Championship to twelve points over McLaren teammate Fernando Alonso. Alonso had only been two points behind Hamilton in the standings before he crashed during the race. Räikkönen's third-place finish ensured he remained in mathematical contention to clinch the drivers' title in the remaining two rounds. His Ferrari teammate, Felipe Massa, dropped out of championship contention after finishing the race in sixth position. Massa was now ten points behind Räikkönen. In the World Constructors' Championship, Ferrari were leading the standings on 170 points. McLaren would have been leading the table on 202 points had they not been given a penalty in the Hungarian Grand Prix, and then disqualified entirely due to the espionage controversy that year. BMW Sauber remained second in the standings, 78 points behind Ferrari, after scoring just two points in the race. Renault ensured that they would finish the year in third, (like BMW Sauber, they were unpassable by any other team), and were 41 points behind.

== Report ==
=== Background ===
Lewis Hamilton of McLaren led the Drivers' Championship by two points from his team-mate Fernando Alonso, who was a further 11 points ahead of Ferrari's Kimi Räikkönen. After McLaren's exclusion from the Constructors' Championship, Ferrari had been confirmed as Constructors' Champions, following their Belgian Grand Prix one-two. They were 71 points ahead of BMW Sauber.

Three Japanese constructors and two Japanese drivers competed in the race. Toyota were 6th in the Constructors' Championship, whilst Honda were 8th, behind their own "B-team" Super Aguri. Takuma Sato was 15th in the Drivers' Championship for Super Aguri, whilst compatriot Sakon Yamamoto had yet to score for Spyker F1, having debuted at the Hungarian Grand Prix.

David Coulthard changed his helmet design for this race, choosing to use the helmet design of former World Rally Champion Colin McRae, who had died two weeks before the race in a helicopter crash.

As with the 2006 race, the event was filmed and broadcast in high-definition by Fuji Television for the domestic Japanese audience.

=== Qualifying ===
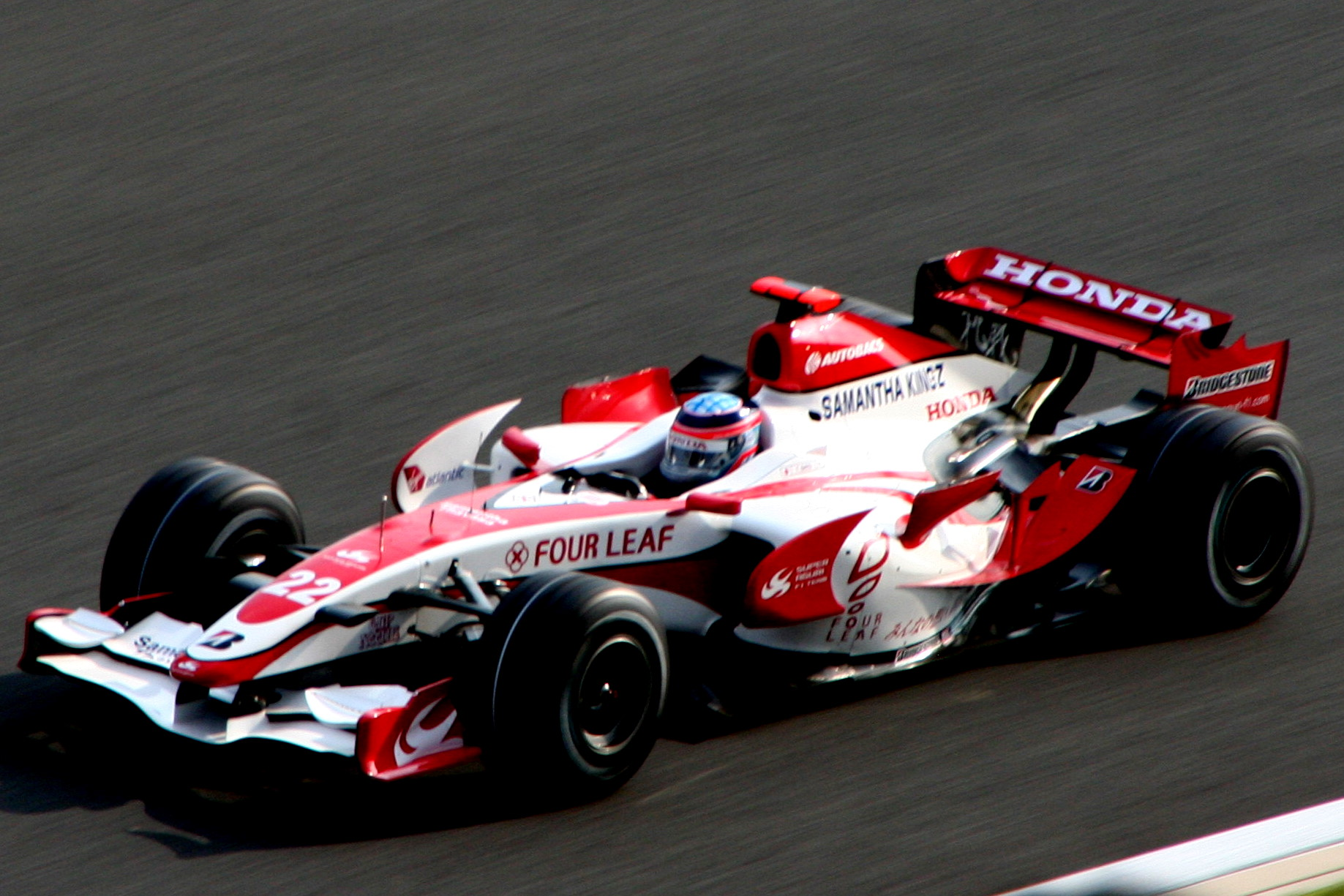
National driver, Takuma Sato, qualified in twenty-first position.

Although the weather had dried out by the time qualifying began, the track was still wet and all the drivers went out on wet tyres.

Qualifying one saw the two Spykers of Adrian Sutil and Sakon Yamamoto and the two Super Aguris of Anthony Davidson and Takuma Sato eliminated, along with Alexander Wurz in the Williams and Rubens Barrichello in the Honda. Ralf Schumacher's Toyota also collided with Yamamoto, forcing both drivers out of qualifying. Schumacher was already through to Q2, but could not set a time in the second session and so qualified 16th.

Qualifying two saw the elimination of the two Renaults of Giancarlo Fisichella and Heikki Kovalainen, David Coulthard's Red Bull, Vitantonio Liuzzi's Toro Rosso and the Toyotas of Jarno Trulli and Schumacher.

Sebastian Vettel in the Toro Rosso and Robert Kubica in the BMW Sauber occupied row 5, just behind Jenson Button, getting his best qualifying of the season in the Honda, and Mark Webber's Red Bull. Nico Rosberg qualified 6th in the Williams, but was penalised ten places for an engine change. This meant that Vettel qualified eighth, the then best qualifying ever for Toro Rosso. Nick Heidfeld qualified 5th for BMW Sauber, and the top four was once again the two McLarens and two Ferraris. The Ferraris failed to get on the front row, with Kimi Räikkönen and Felipe Massa 3rd and 4th respectively. Lewis Hamilton then pipped his more experienced McLaren teammate Fernando Alonso to earn the fifth pole position of his career.

=== Race ===
Due to torrential rainfall, the race was started behind the safety car, which led the field for the first 19 laps. The Ferraris of Kimi Räikkönen and Felipe Massa were forced to pit during the first few laps after starting on standard wet tyres, as opposed to "extreme wet" tyres, which were better-suited to the treacherously wet conditions. Ferrari boss Jean Todt later stated that the team were not informed about the requirements prior to the race, although all other teams were. During the initial safety car period, the FIA instructed the lapped driver Vitantonio Liuzzi to pass the field and catch up to the back of the queue as quickly as he safely could, as a way of gauging whether the track was ready for the race to begin in earnest.

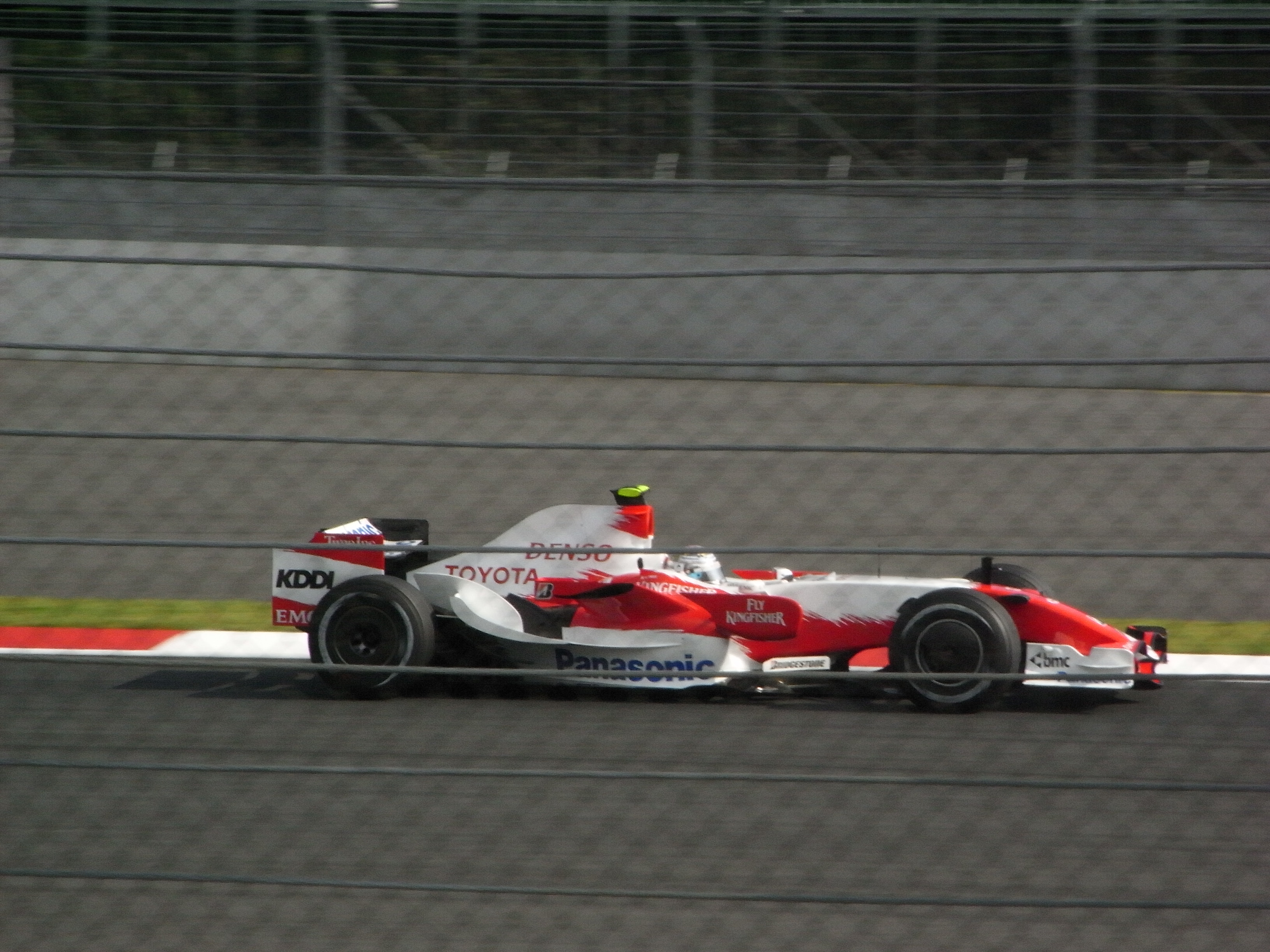
Jarno Trulli was the last car to actually finish, and classified thirteenth for the Toyota team.

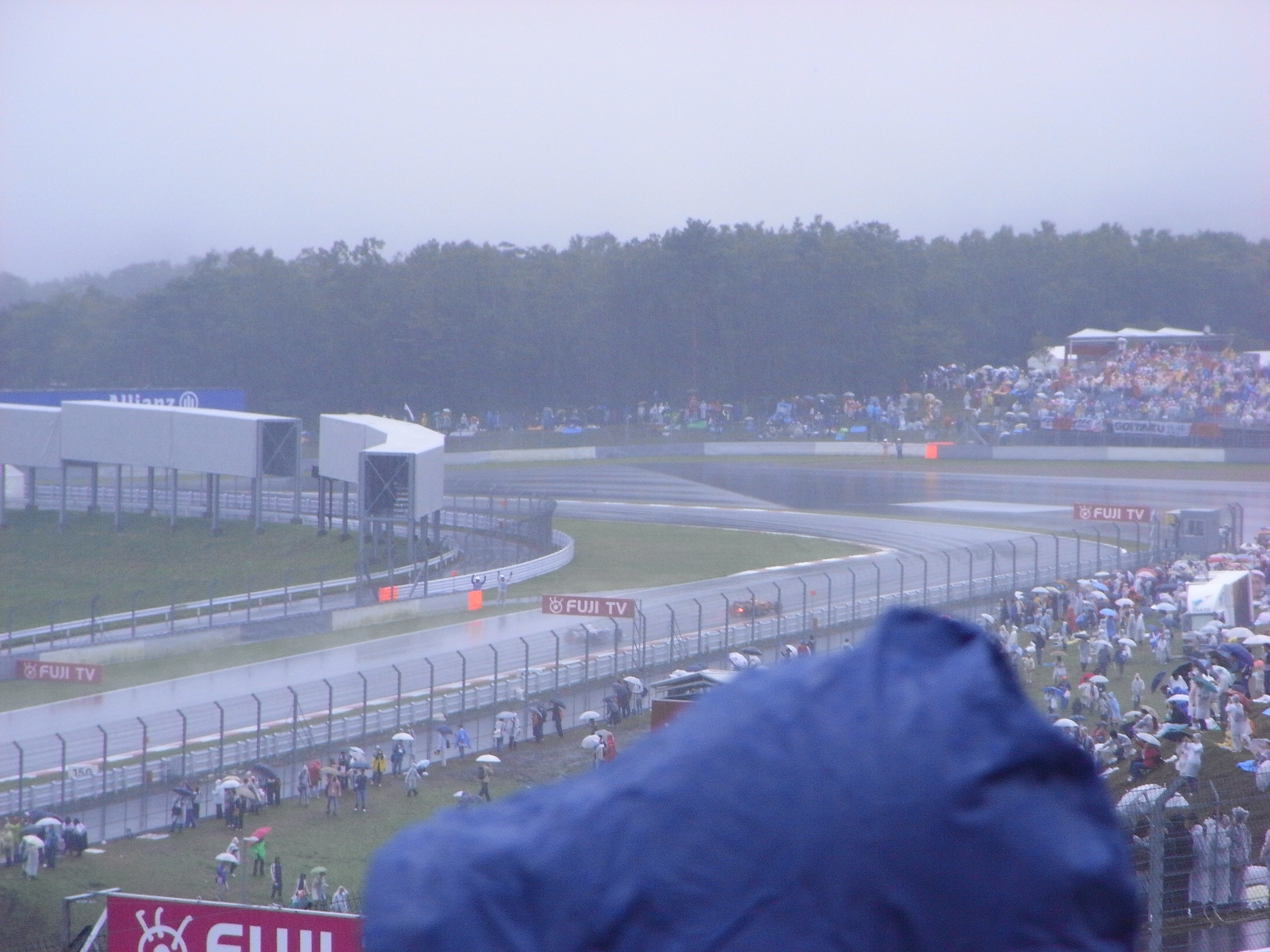
A view of the wet conditions, from the grandstand, during the race.

The Ferraris dropped back to 20th and 21st positions respectively following the pit stops, and Massa pitted again on lap 15. When the safety car finally left the circuit, the two McLarens began the race proper at the head of the field, in front of the quick-starting Sebastian Vettel. The Toro Rosso driver had taken third place from Nick Heidfeld, after the latter and Jenson Button's Honda collided. Mark Webber was in fourth by the first racing lap as a result of the collision, despite still suffering from the after-effects of food poisoning, having earlier vomited into his helmet during the first safety car period. A first-corner spin caused Alexander Wurz to collide heavily with Felipe Massa's Ferrari. Wurz's car sustained heavy damage and he retired on the spot.

Later in the race, Fernando Alonso crashed out, later blaming aquaplaning for the accident, which once again brought out the safety car. It was the first time that a McLaren car had failed to finish during the 2007 season. During this safety car period on lap 45, third-placed Sebastian Vettel crashed into the rear of second-placed Webber in the wet conditions, Webber retiring immediately and Vettel returning to the pits to retire. Vettel had earlier became the youngest ever driver to lead a lap of a Formula One race (aged 20 years and 89 days) – his record was subsequently broken by Max Verstappen (aged 18 years and 228 days) at the 2016 Spanish Grand Prix. The collision put Heikki Kovalainen's Renault in second place, which he managed to hold until the end of the race, despite repeated overtaking attempts by Kimi Räikkönen. It was Kovalainen's first podium finish. Räikkönen would eventually finish third, ahead of David Coulthard in fourth for Red Bull Racing. This was the first time that two Finnish drivers had both finished on the podium.

On the final lap, Felipe Massa prevailed in his battle with BMW driver Robert Kubica. The Pole had previously served a drive through penalty for colliding with Hamilton. Massa finished sixth, and Kubica seventh, behind Giancarlo Fisichella's Renault. Vitantonio Liuzzi finished in eighth, scoring the first 2007 championship points for Toro Rosso. However, these points were later removed when Liuzzi was penalised for overtaking Adrian Sutil under waved yellow flags. This promoted Sutil to eighth, giving him and the Spyker team their first and only F1 points.

=== Post-race ===
Following the race, Sebastian Vettel received a 10-place penalty for the next race in Shanghai, China, for causing the collision with Mark Webber which put both drivers out of the race, but his punishment was later reduced to a reprimand when new evidence was presented to the FIA, prompting it to begin an investigation of Lewis Hamilton for dangerous driving and causing the collision himself. Hamilton was leading the race right in front of Webber, before suddenly braking and forcing Webber to follow suit lest he be penalised for overtaking behind the safety car, potentially causing Vettel's car to run into the back of Webber. Hamilton might have faced either disqualification or a grid penalty for the next race, but the FIA decided not to impose any penalty.

== Problems with the circuit ==
The event was afflicted by poor transportation, poor facilities (including some reserved seats without a view), a lack of organization, and expensive meals that meant a simple lunch-box was sold for 10,000 yen (US$87) at the circuit.

=== Transportation ===
The free practice session on Saturday was abandoned after repeated delays due to fog, which grounded the medical helicopter. Only three drivers set a time in four minutes: Alexander Wurz (Williams-Toyota), Nico Rosberg (Williams-Toyota) and Jarno Trulli (Toyota).

Before the race, there were suggestions that the plan of carrying all of the 100,000 or more spectators only by shuttle bus would be impossible. To relieve people's doubts, the circuit announced that there was complete preparation for the race. These doubts were realised when, after the qualifying session on Saturday, the shuttle buses could not leave because the road on the east gate of the circuit sank around 16:00. As a result, approximately 20,000 spectators were forced to stay for four hours or more until 21:00. For the race on Sunday, only the shuttle bus was admitted for spectators as transport.

=== Refund ===
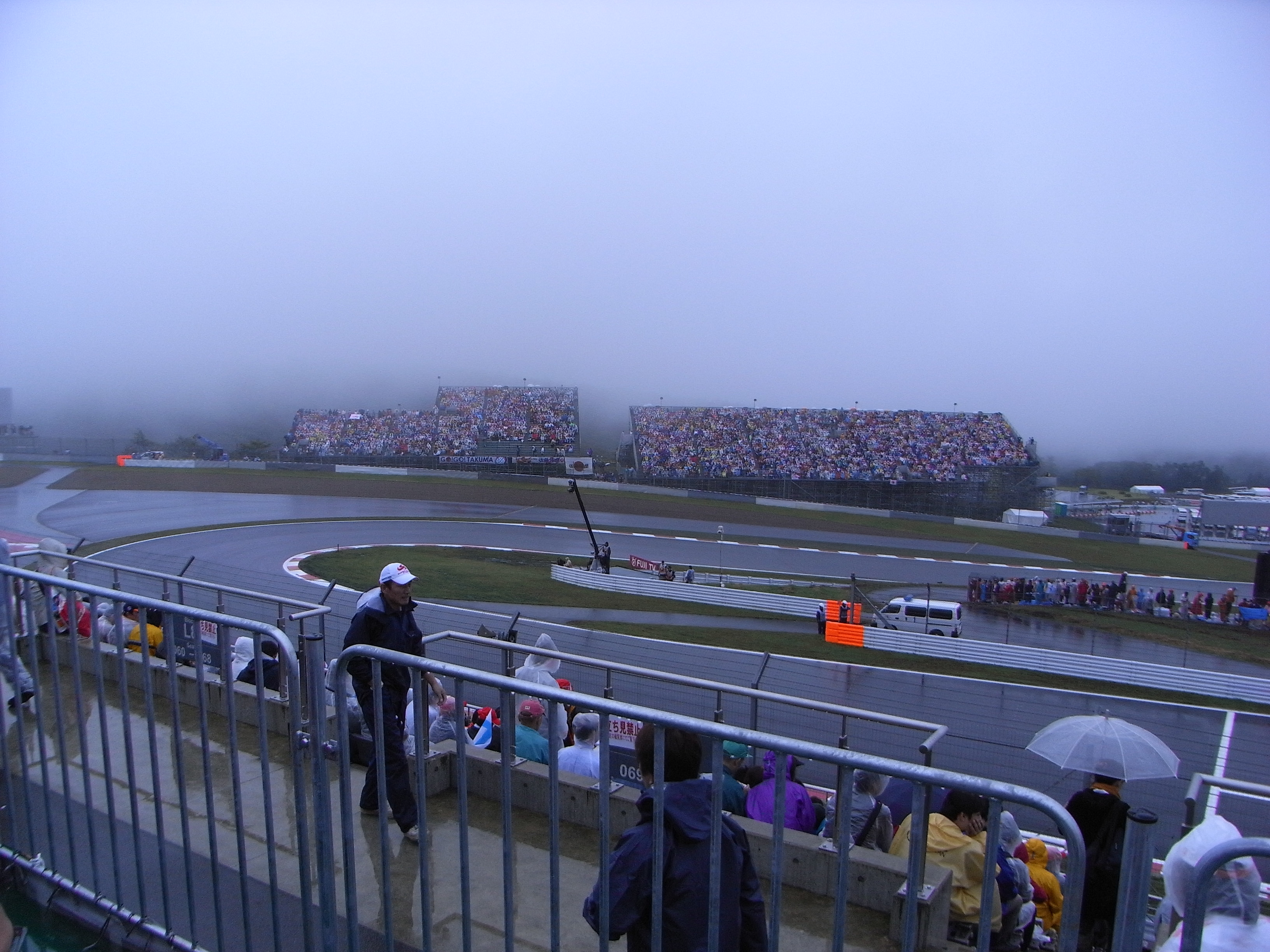
View from controversial 'C' stand.

On Sunday morning, the circuit announced that they would refund spectators who had bought seats in the reserved seat area on 'C' stand, near the first corner. This was due to the low visibility which meant that the cars on the racing line were not seen at all. The cost of the tickets, 50,000 yen (US$435), was scheduled to be reimbursed to 7,000 people who were in the stand. The total cost of the refund was expected to be around 350 million yen (US$3 million). After the race on Sunday, the circuit held a press conference to apologise for problems and announced that they would refund another 85 spectators who did not arrive at the circuit until after the start of the race due to the delay of the shuttle bus. The circuit said that they would reimburse them for all the costs caused by watching the race: the transportation expenses, the hotel charges and the cost of the tickets.

=== Toyota bias ===
Fuji Speedway prohibited spectators from setting up flags and banners supporting teams and drivers, with the exception of the Toyota F1 team whose owner also owned the circuit. Therefore, there were very few flags and banners in the event compared with other Grand Prix events. After the event, Japanese media figures such as Fuji TV F1 commentator Jun Imamiya, and Fuji TV F1 commentator and former mechanic for Benetton Formula Tetsuo Tsugawa criticised the organization of the circuit. Tsugawa mentioned:

...Although I have worked in Formula One for thirty years, this is the first time I have seen a Grand Prix race without seeing fans wave the flag of Ferrari. I think this is inexcusable. What I heard was Fuji Speedway prohibited flags and banners of F1 teams, but I saw a Toyota F1 flag in the stands of the Toyota-owned circuit.
The track later said the flags were not prohibited, but there was a miscommunication between the race organisers and the staff of the circuit. However, many fans familiar with Formula One noticed the strangeness of the circuit without the team banners. Why was this not solved on initial notice?

However, the event was well received by visitors in the paddock. Despite the problems and criticism, the team principal of Toyota F1, Tadashi Yamashina praised the event:

...I would like to say congratulations to Fuji Speedway for hosting this race for the first time in 30 years. The facilities here are excellent and the race was well organised.

In 2009, the Japanese Grand Prix was held again at Suzuka, with the plan to alternate between the two circuits in subsequent years. It was suggested that this could help to prevent future shows of such flagrant parochialism. However, Toyota later announced that the Japanese Grand Prix would not be held at Fuji Speedway any more, and the 2008 Japanese Grand Prix was the last held at the circuit.

=== Lawsuit ===
On 16 June 2008, 109 spectators went to Tokyo District Court and took an action against the circuit to claim total 32 million yen (US$295,500) in compensation for bad health and missing the race due to the problems with the shuttle buses.

== Classification ==
=== Qualifying ===
Pos.	No.	Driver	Constructor	Q1	Q2	Q3	Grid
1	2	(United Kingdom) Lewis Hamilton	McLaren-Mercedes	1:25.489	1:24.753	1:25.368	1
2	1	(Spain) Fernando Alonso	McLaren-Mercedes	1:25.379	1:24.806	1:25.438	2
3	6	(Finland) Kimi Räikkönen	Ferrari	1:25.390	1:24.988	1:25.516	3
4	5	(Brazil) Felipe Massa	Ferrari	1:25.359	1:25.049	1:25.765	4
5	9	(Germany) Nick Heidfeld	BMW Sauber	1:25.971	1:25.248	1:26.505	5
6	16	(Germany) Nico Rosberg	Williams-Toyota	1:26.579	1:25.816	1:26.728	16^{2}
7	7	(United Kingdom) Jenson Button	Honda	1:26.614	1:25.454	1:26.913	6
8	15	(Australia) Mark Webber	Red Bull-Renault	1:25.970	1:25.535	1:26.914	7
9	19	(Germany) Sebastian Vettel	Toro Rosso-Ferrari	1:26.025	1:25.909	1:26.973	8
10	10	(Poland) Robert Kubica	BMW Sauber	1:26.300	1:25.530	1:27.225	9
11	3	(Italy) Giancarlo Fisichella	Renault	1:26.909	1:26.033		10
12	4	(Finland) Heikki Kovalainen	Renault	1:27.223	1:26.232		11
13	14	(United Kingdom) David Coulthard	Red Bull-Renault	1:26.904	1:26.247		12
14	12	(Italy) Jarno Trulli	Toyota	1:26.711	1:26.253		13
15	18	(Italy) Vitantonio Liuzzi	Toro Rosso-Ferrari	1:27.234	1:26.948		14
16	11	(Germany) Ralf Schumacher	Toyota	1:27.191	No time^{1}		15
17	8	(Brazil) Rubens Barrichello	Honda	1:27.323			17
18	17	(Austria) Alexander Wurz	Williams-Toyota	1:27.454			18
19	23	(United Kingdom) Anthony Davidson	Super Aguri-Honda	1:27.564			19
20	20	(Germany) Adrian Sutil	Spyker-Ferrari	1:28.628			20
21	22	(Japan) Takuma Sato	Super Aguri-Honda	1:28.762			21
22	21	(Japan) Sakon Yamamoto	Spyker-Ferrari	1:29.668			22

Notes

- ^1 – Ralf Schumacher had no car during the second session of qualifying as he crashed into the back of Sakon Yamamoto at the end of the first session.
- ^2 – During Friday morning practice, Williams decided to change Nico Rosberg's engine, giving him a 10-place grid penalty for the race.

=== Race ===
Pos	No	Driver	Constructor	Laps	Time/Retired	Grid	Points
1	2	(United Kingdom) Lewis Hamilton	McLaren-Mercedes	67	2:00:34.579	1	10
2	4	(Finland) Heikki Kovalainen	Renault	67	+8.377	11	8
3	6	(Finland) Kimi Räikkönen	Ferrari	67	+9.478	3	6
4	14	(United Kingdom) David Coulthard	Red Bull-Renault	67	+20.297	12	5
5	3	(Italy) Giancarlo Fisichella	Renault	67	+38.864	10	4
6	5	(Brazil) Felipe Massa	Ferrari	67	+49.042	4	3
7	10	(Poland) Robert Kubica	BMW Sauber	67	+49.285	9	2
8	20	(Germany) Adrian Sutil	Spyker-Ferrari	67	+1:00.129	20	1
9	18	(Italy) Vitantonio Liuzzi	Toro Rosso-Ferrari	67	+1:20.622^{4}	PL^{3}	
10	8	(Brazil) Rubens Barrichello	Honda	67	+1:28.342	17	
11	7	(United Kingdom) Jenson Button	Honda	66	Suspension	6	
12	21	(Japan) Sakon Yamamoto	Spyker-Ferrari	66	+1 lap	22	
13	12	(Italy) Jarno Trulli	Toyota	66	+1 lap	13	
14	9	(Germany) Nick Heidfeld	BMW Sauber	65	Technical	5	
15	22	(Japan) Takuma Sato	Super Aguri-Honda	65	Collision	21	
Ret	11	(Germany) Ralf Schumacher	Toyota	55	Puncture	15	
Ret	23	(United Kingdom) Anthony Davidson	Super Aguri-Honda	54	Throttle	19	
Ret	16	(Germany) Nico Rosberg	Williams-Toyota	49	Electronics	16	
Ret	19	(Germany) Sebastian Vettel	Toro Rosso-Ferrari	46	Collision damage	8	
Ret	15	(Australia) Mark Webber	Red Bull-Renault	45	Collision	7	
Ret	1	(Spain) Fernando Alonso	McLaren-Mercedes	41	Accident	2	
Ret	17	(Austria) Alexander Wurz	Williams-Toyota	19	Collision	18	

Notes

- ^3 – Vitantonio Liuzzi started from the pit lane after opting for a dry weather setup.
- ^4 – Vitantonio Liuzzi finished eighth, but was handed a 25 second penalty after overtaking under yellow-flags.

== Championship standings after the race ==
Drivers' Championship standings

+/–	Pos.	Driver	Points
	1	(United Kingdom) **Lewis Hamilton***	107
	2	(Spain) **Fernando Alonso***	95
	3	(Finland) **Kimi Räikkönen***	90
	4	(Brazil) Felipe Massa	80
	5	(Germany) Nick Heidfeld	56

Constructors' Championship standings

+/–	Pos.	Constructor	Points
	1	(Italy) **Ferrari**	170
	2	(Germany) BMW Sauber	92
	3	(France) Renault	51
	4	(United Kingdom) Williams-Toyota	28
	5	(Austria) Red Bull-Renault	23

- Note: Only the top five positions are included for both sets of standings.
- **Bold text** indicates the 2007 World Constructors' Champions.
- **Bold text** and an asterisk indicates competitors who still had a theoretical chance of becoming World Champion.

Previous race: 2007 Belgian Grand Prix	FIA Formula One World Championship; 2007 season	Next race: 2007 Chinese Grand Prix
Previous race: 2006 Japanese Grand Prix	Japanese Grand Prix	Next race: 2008 Japanese Grand Prix
