= 1978 in Finland =

- Decades: 1950s; 1960s; 1970s; 1980s; 1990s
- See also: Other events of 1978; Timeline of Finnish history

The following lists events that occurred in 1978 in Finland.

== Incumbents ==
- President: Urho Kekkonen
- Prime Minister: Kalevi Sorsa

== Events ==
- 2 January – At 1978 IIHF European U18 Championship final game, the Finnish ice hockey defeats Russia.
- 15–16 January – 1978 Finnish presidential election
- 18–26 February – FIS Nordic World Ski Championships 1978 are held in Lahti.
- 1 July – Finland establishes diplomatic relations with Botswana.
- 29 August–3 September – Finland sends 33 athletes to the 1978 European Athletics Championships.
- 30 September – Finnair Flight 405 aircraft is hijacked by Aarno Lamminparras in Oulu, Finland.
- 13 October – Poet and Muse drama film is released.

=== Full date unknown ===
- Nuorallatanssijan kuolema eli kuinka Pete Q sai siivet, Finnish rock musical is performed.

== Births ==
- 19 January – Laura Närhi, pop singer
- 28 February – Mikko Innanen, saxophonist and composer
- 1 March – Pete Seppälä, singer
- 8 March – Taneli Tikka, entrepreneur and IT influencer
- 21 April –
  - Jukka Nevalainen, drummer, musician
  - Paleface (birth name Karri Pekka Matias Miettinen), hip hop musician
- 11 May – Perttu Kivilaakso, cello player
- 12 June – Mikko Lehtonen, ice hockey player
- 24 June – Emppu Vuorinen, guitarist, songwriter
- 19 July – Ilpo Larha, Finnish criminal.
- 17 August – Jaani Peuhu, musician, producer, and songwriter
- 22 September – Mikko Leppilampi, actor, musician, and TV host
- 23 September – Valtteri Laurell Pöyhönen, jazz guitarist, pianist, composer, bandleader and producer
- 24 November – Susanna Majuri, fine art photographer (died 2020)
- 28 December – Janita (Janita Maria (née Raukko), Finnish-born, American singer-songwriter

=== Full date unknown ===
- Nopsajalka (birth name Antti Ilmari Hakala), musician and producer

== Deaths ==
- 13 March – Kaare Bache, triple jumper
- 28 March – Karl Lennart Oesch, World War II general (born 1892)
