= Ålanders =

Inhabitants of the Åland Islands, an autonomous region of Finland

- The flag of Åland, adopted 9 December 1953

Regions with significant populations
- Åland: 30,541 (2023)

Languages
- Swedish (Åland dialects)

Religion
- Evangelical Lutheran (66.7%, 2023)

Related ethnic groups
- Finland Swedes, Swedes

Ålanders (Swedish: ålänningar) are the people of Åland, an autonomous region of Finland. Ålanders may be defined by the regional citizenship known as the right of domicile, by descent, or by residence in the region. Åland is unilingually Swedish, and most Ålanders speak Swedish as their mother tongue.

== Definitions ==
Who counts as an Ålander can be delimited in three ways:

- Regional citizenship. An Ålander is a person holding the right of domicile (hembygdsrätt), a form of regional citizenship.
- Descent. An Ålander is a person born in Åland or having parents from the region.
- Residence. An Ålander is a person permanently resident and registered in Åland.

=== Right of domicile ===
The right of domicile is held by children under 18 who are Finnish citizens resident in the region if one parent holds it. It is also granted on application to Finnish citizens who have moved to Åland, have resided there without interruption for at least five years, and have a satisfactory command of Swedish.

Only holders of the right of domicile may vote in elections to the Parliament of Åland and to municipal councils, or stand as candidates, and only they are exempt from the restrictions on acquiring real property in the region. The right to carry on a trade or profession may be restricted by regional law for those without it.

Holders are also exempt from conscription. Under section 12 of the Act on the Autonomy of Åland they are entitled to serve in the pilotage and lighthouse service or in another branch of the civil administration instead of performing military service; because no such service has ever been established, they are exempt from conscription altogether. The exemption does not apply to those who moved to the region after the age of twelve.

At the end of 2023, 26,101 people held the right of domicile, of whom 1,751 lived outside Åland.

=== Place of birth and residence ===
At the end of 2023, 18,775 of the region's inhabitants had been born in Åland, or 61.5 per cent of the population, down from 74.1 per cent in 1990. Of the remainder, 5,503 had been born in mainland Finland, 3,194 in Sweden and 3,069 in other countries.

The population has grown steadily, from 24,604 in 1990 to 30,541 at the end of 2023. Of the residents, 66.7 per cent belonged to the Evangelical Lutheran Church of Finland at the end of 2023 and 32.0 per cent to no religious community, compared with 94.8 per cent Lutheran membership in 1990.

== Language ==
Under the Act on the Autonomy of Åland the region is unilingually Swedish, and the official language of state, regional and municipal administration is Swedish. Finnish citizens nevertheless have the right to use Finnish in their own case before courts and other state authorities in the region. At the end of 2023, just over 85 per cent of inhabitants, some 26,100 people, had Swedish as their mother tongue.

The Åland dialects are regarded as the most modern dialects in Finland and fall into two groups: the largely uniform dialects of the Åland mainland and the more divergent dialects of the archipelago parishes. Features include the lengthening of short syllables, an open ö, the shift of y to i, and a simplified system of two genders instead of three.

== History ==
=== Early history ===
The first people reached Åland some 6,000 years ago, probably from the Turku archipelago to the east, across roughly a hundred kilometres of open sea. Around 3300–2800 BC the direction reversed, when people of the Pitted Ware culture arrived from Sweden. The Viking Age was the richest period in finds, but these cease entirely around the year 1000. Christianity was established in Åland during the 12th century in connection with a new colonisation from Sweden, which left numerous traces in the place names.

=== Direct Finnish rule (1917-1922) ===
When Finland became independent in 1917, most Ålanders identified as Swedes rather than as Finns, giving rise to a movement for reunion with Sweden. Through the settlement of the Åland Islands dispute in 1921 the region instead became an autonomous part of Finland, with guarantees for the Swedish language and culture.

=== Autonomous region (1922-present) ===
In a survey conducted by Statistics and Research Åland in the spring of 1999 among more than 800 randomly selected adult residents, the identity of Ålander scored 3.4 on a scale from 0 to 4, ahead of Nordic (2.4), Finn (2.1), Finland Swede (1.7), European (1.5), and Swede and ethnic Finn (0.7 each). Some 68 per cent said they felt themselves to be Ålanders to a very great extent, while 7 per cent felt no affinity with that identity at all.

Ålandic and Finnish identity stood in inverse proportion to each other, and those born in the region rated the Ålandic identity considerably higher than immigrants did. More than twenty years of residence were needed before newcomers approached the average. Of fifteen factors rated for their importance to Ålandic identity, the Swedish language came first (3.4), followed by the right of domicile (3.2), the natural environment (3.2) and the autonomy (3.1); church activity ranked last (1.2).

==== Independence movement ====
The idea of Åland as becoming an independent country has gained ground in recent years. The political party Future of Åland advocates independence, while the other Ålandic parties want to expand Aland's autonomy. No politician in Åland now advocates reunion with Sweden. According to opinion polls reported in 2002, 70 per cent of Ålanders would vote for the region to continue to belong to Finland.

== See also ==
- Åland
- Åland dialects
- Åland Islands dispute
- History of Åland
