= Ilpo Larha =

Finnish criminal

Ilpo Tapio Larha (19 July 1968 in Helsinki, Finland – 17 March 1994 in Lahti, Finland) was a Finnish criminal.

Larha became known through the contract murder of a 77-year-old crippled businessman Wilhelm Högsten in Jollas, a suburb of Helsinki, on 24 April 1992. Larha was hired by Högsten's 47-year-old son Fred. Larha, Högsten and 31-year-old businessman Hannu Ratia, who drove Larha to the site of the murder, were sentenced to life in prison.

On 25 February 1994 Larha escaped from a Helsinki state prison with 37-year-old Kullervo Haikas, alias Pertti Ruokolainen, who had been serving a 13-year sentence for drug crimes.

On 1 March, Larha robbed a bank in Pitäjänmäki, nearly killing a cashier.

After this, Larha and Haikas barricaded themselves with two hostages in an apartment in Lahti. Police discovered them on 15 March. This started a siege that lasted for 55 hours. During the siege, Larha called Radio 99's live broadcast. He said among other things, that there was C-4 in the house, which is a plastic explosive stronger than dynamite, that he had been trained to operate as a pioneer during his conscription service, and that he would be able to blow up the whole house if the police tried to enter. In the midst of a siege, Larha fell asleep then Haikas and the hostages escaped through the balcony, Larha committed suicide on 17 March 1994, shooting himself simultaneously with two handguns.

Finland's president Tarja Halonen pardoned Hannu Ratia in the end of 2005 and Fred Högsten in May 2006.

In the summer of 2022, Petri Kotwica began filming a television series about Larha called Piiritys (The Siege). Elias Salonen plays the role of Larha. Piiritys starts on the Ruutu+ streaming service on Friday, January 6, 2023.
