= 2007 Formula One World Championship =

58th season of the FIA Formula One World Championship

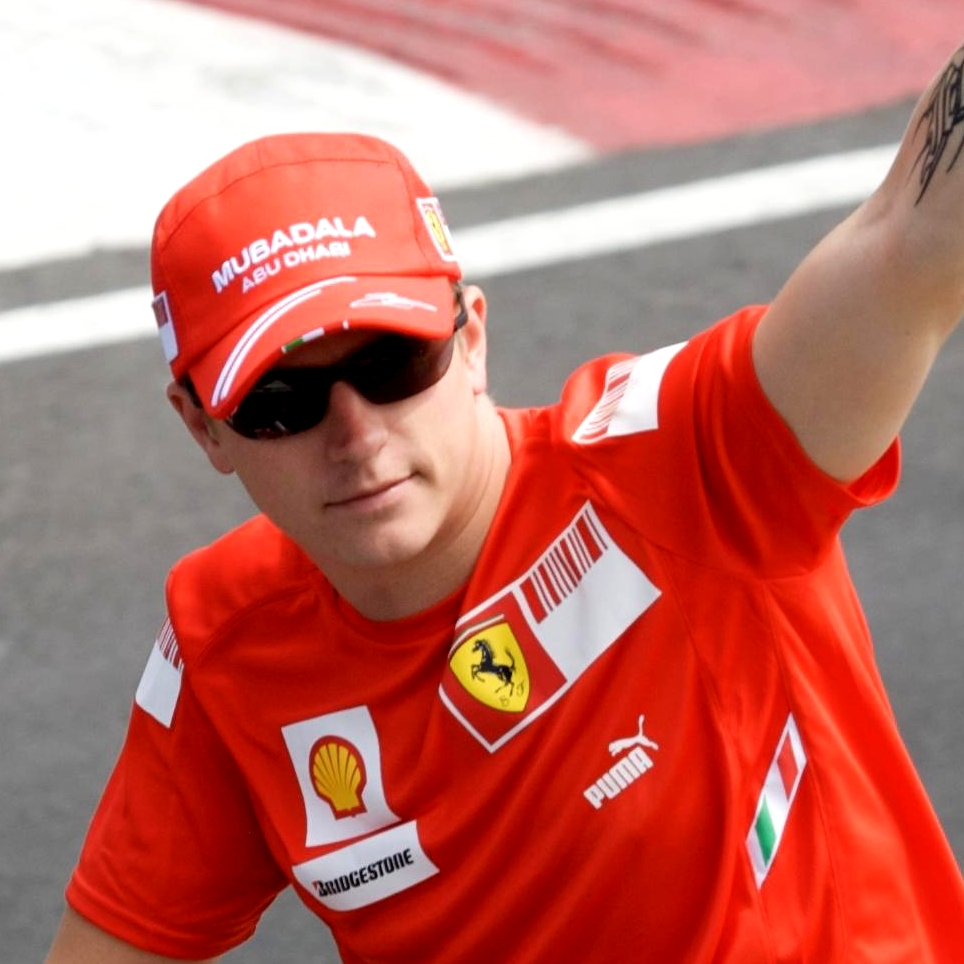
Kimi Räikkönen (pictured in 2008), the 2007 World Drivers' Champion with 110 points, won his only title by a single point in his first year with Ferrari. He remains the last Ferrari driver to win a championship.

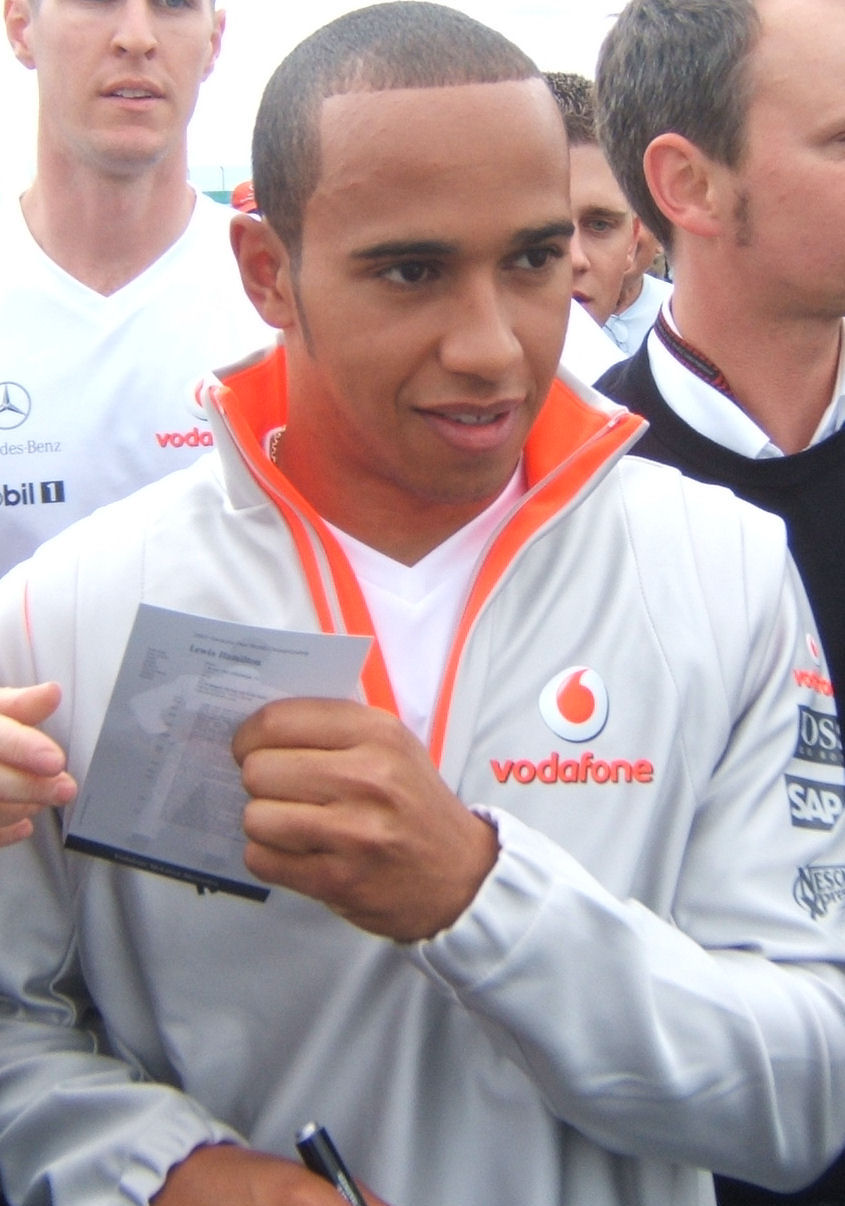
Lewis Hamilton, runner-up with 109 points. Hamilton recorded nine consecutive podium finishes in his debut season, more than any other rookie in Formula One history. He also became the youngest runner-up until Sebastian Vettel in 2009.

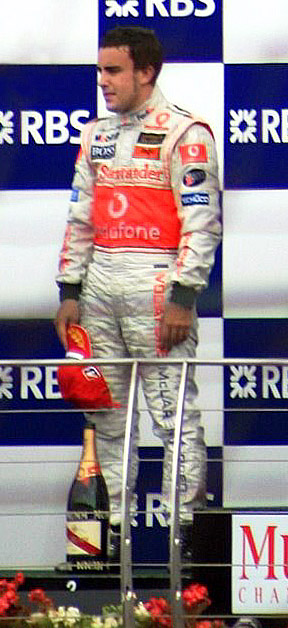
Fernando Alonso, the defending double World Champion, also recorded 109 points but was placed 3rd through count-back.

The 2007 FIA Formula One World Championship was the 61st season of FIA Formula One motor racing. It began on 18 March and ended on 21 October after seventeen events. The Drivers' Championship was won by Ferrari driver Kimi Räikkönen by one point at the final race of the season, making him the third Finnish driver to take the title. An appeal by McLaren regarding the legality of some cars in the final race could have altered the championship standings, but on 16 November, the appeal was rejected by the International Court of Appeal, confirming the championship results. Räikkönen entered the final race in third position in the drivers' standings, but emerged as champion after the chequered flag, a feat first accomplished by Giuseppe Farina in 1950.

A major talking point of the season had been an espionage controversy involving Ferrari and McLaren, which led to McLaren being excluded from the Constructors' Championship. As a result, Ferrari clinched the championship at the Belgian Grand Prix. Defending double Constructors' Champions Renault proved to be uncompetitive with their R27 car taking them to third in the constructors' standings (after McLaren's exclusion) and ended up win-less for the first time since the 2002 season. Renault achieved one podium during the season, with Heikki Kovalainen finishing second at the rain affected 2007 Japanese Grand Prix.

The 2007 season heralded the end of the existing Concorde Agreement between the existing Formula One constructors and Bernie Ecclestone. In particular, Mercedes-Benz, BMW, and Honda (collectively the Grand Prix Manufacturers' Association) had a number of outstanding disagreements with the FIA and Ecclestone on financial and technical grounds. They had threatened to boycott Formula One from the 2008 season onwards and instead stage their own rival series, before signing a memorandum of understanding (MoU) at the 2006 Spanish Grand Prix.

2007 also marked the seventh and final season, since its reintroduction in 2001, in which the use of traction control was permitted in Formula One. Standardised electronic control units (ECUs) were mandated by the FIA from the 2008 season onwards, which prohibited teams from using this kind of technology. The season also saw the debuts of future world champions Lewis Hamilton (the first black driver to participate in the category) and Sebastian Vettel (although, in Vettel's case, this was the first year in which no German driver won a race since 1991).

Honda ran with an "Earth livery" on their RA107 car. It was the first time since 1968, the year in which sponsorship in the sport became widespread, that a team ran sponsor-free for an entire season. Michelin's withdrawal from F1 at the end of 2006 meant that Bridgestone was the sole tyre supplier once more for 2007, having previously been F1's sole tyre manufacturer for the 1999 and 2000 seasons.

As of 2026, this is the last Drivers' Championship won by a Ferrari driver and the last drivers' title won by a Finnish driver to date in Formula One.

== Teams and drivers ==
The following teams and drivers participated in the 2007 FIA Formula One World Championship. Drivers' cars are numbered as per the official FIA 2007 entry list. All team details are as per the Formula 1 official website, except where noted. Note that there is no car number 13, as is the historical tradition. All teams competed with tyres supplied by Bridgestone.

Entrant	Constructor	Chassis	Engine	No.	Race drivers	Rounds
(United Kingdom) Vodafone McLaren Mercedes	McLaren-Mercedes	MP4-22	Mercedes FO 108T	1	(Spain) Fernando Alonso	All
(United Kingdom) Vodafone McLaren Mercedes	McLaren-Mercedes	MP4-22	Mercedes FO 108T	2	(United Kingdom) Lewis Hamilton	All
(France) ING Renault F1 Team	Renault	R27	Renault RS27	3	(Italy) Giancarlo Fisichella	All
(France) ING Renault F1 Team	Renault	R27	Renault RS27	4	(Finland) Heikki Kovalainen	All
(Italy) Scuderia Ferrari Marlboro (Note: Ferrari entered rounds 3, 5, 16 as "Scuderia Ferrari Marlboro", and rounds 1–2, 4, 6–15, 17 as "Scuderia Ferrari".)	Ferrari	F2007	Ferrari 056 2007	5	(Brazil) Felipe Massa	All
(Italy) Scuderia Ferrari Marlboro	Ferrari	F2007	Ferrari 056 2007	6	(Finland) Kimi Räikkönen	All
(Japan) Honda Racing F1 Team	Honda	RA107	Honda RA807E	7	(United Kingdom) Jenson Button	All
(Japan) Honda Racing F1 Team	Honda	RA107	Honda RA807E	8	(Brazil) Rubens Barrichello	All
(Germany) BMW Sauber F1 Team	BMW Sauber	F1.07	BMW P86/7	9	(Germany) Nick Heidfeld	All
(Germany) BMW Sauber F1 Team	BMW Sauber	F1.07	BMW P86/7	10	(Poland) Robert Kubica	1–6, 8–17
(Germany) BMW Sauber F1 Team	BMW Sauber	F1.07	BMW P86/7	10	(Germany) Sebastian Vettel	7
(Japan) Panasonic Toyota Racing	Toyota	TF107	Toyota RVX-07	11	(Germany) Ralf Schumacher	All
(Japan) Panasonic Toyota Racing	Toyota	TF107	Toyota RVX-07	12	(Italy) Jarno Trulli	All
(Austria) Red Bull Racing	Red Bull-Renault	RB3	Renault RS27	14	(United Kingdom) David Coulthard	All
(Austria) Red Bull Racing	Red Bull-Renault	RB3	Renault RS27	15	(Australia) Mark Webber	All
(United Kingdom) AT&T Williams	Williams-Toyota	FW29	Toyota RVX-07	16	(Germany) Nico Rosberg	All
(United Kingdom) AT&T Williams	Williams-Toyota	FW29	Toyota RVX-07	17	(Austria) Alexander Wurz	1–16
(United Kingdom) AT&T Williams	Williams-Toyota	FW29	Toyota RVX-07	17	(Japan) Kazuki Nakajima	17
(Italy) Scuderia Toro Rosso	Toro Rosso-Ferrari	STR2	Ferrari 056 2006	18	(Italy) Vitantonio Liuzzi	All
(Italy) Scuderia Toro Rosso	Toro Rosso-Ferrari	STR2	Ferrari 056 2006	19	(United States) Scott Speed	1–10
(Italy) Scuderia Toro Rosso	Toro Rosso-Ferrari	STR2	Ferrari 056 2006	19	(Germany) Sebastian Vettel	11–17
(Netherlands) Etihad Aldar Spyker F1 Team	Spyker-Ferrari	F8-VII; F8-VIIB	Ferrari 056 2006	20	(Germany) Adrian Sutil	All
(Netherlands) Etihad Aldar Spyker F1 Team	Spyker-Ferrari	F8-VII; F8-VIIB	Ferrari 056 2006	21	(Netherlands) Christijan Albers	1–9
(Netherlands) Etihad Aldar Spyker F1 Team	Spyker-Ferrari	F8-VII; F8-VIIB	Ferrari 056 2006	21	(Germany) Markus Winkelhock	10
(Netherlands) Etihad Aldar Spyker F1 Team	Spyker-Ferrari	F8-VII; F8-VIIB	Ferrari 056 2006	21	(Japan) Sakon Yamamoto	11–17
(Japan) Super Aguri F1 Team	Super Aguri-Honda	SA07	Honda RA807E	22	(Japan) Takuma Sato	All
(Japan) Super Aguri F1 Team	Super Aguri-Honda	SA07	Honda RA807E	23	(United Kingdom) Anthony Davidson	All

- ^{†} All engines were 2.4-litre V8 configuration.

=== Free practice drivers ===
Three constructors entered free practice only drivers over the course of the season: Sebastian Vettel for BMW Sauber at the opening two rounds, Christian Klien for Honda at the British Grand Prix and Kazuki Nakajima for Williams at five Grands Prix.

Drivers that took part in free practice sessions
Constructor	Practice drivers		
Constructor	No.	Driver name	Rounds
Honda	34	(Austria) Christian Klien	9
BMW Sauber	35	(Germany) Sebastian Vettel	1–2
Williams–Toyota	38	(Japan) Kazuki Nakajima	1–2, 6–7, 16

=== Driver changes ===
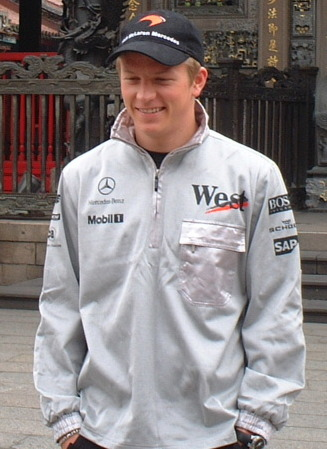
Kimi Räikkönen (pictured in 2002) left McLaren at the end of the 2006 season to join Ferrari before the season.

The 2005 and 2006 World Champion Fernando Alonso switched to McLaren after five years at Renault. Following the retirement of Michael Schumacher and Jacques Villeneuve, Alonso was the only driver on the grid in this season who had previously won a drivers' championship.

Juan Pablo Montoya, who was a McLaren driver until the aftermath of the 2006 United States Grand Prix moved to the NASCAR Cup Series for 2007, effectively ending his Formula One career, as announced on 9 July 2006.

On 2 August 2006, Williams announced that test and reserve driver Alexander Wurz would step up to a race seat for 2007, replacing Australian Mark Webber. On 7 August 2006, Red Bull Racing announced their 2007 driver line-up of David Coulthard and Mark Webber, displacing Christian Klien. On 7 August 2006, BMW Sauber announced that Jacques Villeneuve's contract had been terminated immediately and for the rest of the season would be replaced by test driver Robert Kubica. Kubica was later announced on 19 October 2006 to retain the race seat for the 2007 season, with Sebastian Vettel remaining as the team's test driver. On 21 December 2006 BMW Sauber announced former Jordan F1 and GP2 driver Timo Glock as their second test driver.

On 6 September 2006, Renault confirmed Heikki Kovalainen as the team's replacement for Fernando Alonso. On 10 September 2006, Scuderia Ferrari announced Kimi Räikkönen to replace the retiring Michael Schumacher.

On 15 November 2006, Super Aguri confirmed Anthony Davidson as Sakon Yamamoto's replacement. On 24 November 2006, McLaren confirmed Lewis Hamilton, their junior program driver who won the GP2 Series title that year as their second driver.

On 21 December 2006, Spyker confirmed Adrian Sutil as their first driver, replacing WTCC-bound Tiago Monteiro.

==== In-season changes ====
On 10 July 2007, Spyker announced that Christijan Albers would no longer be driving for the team. The given reason was a failure to pay sponsorship monies due. Markus Winkelhock raced Spyker's second car at the European Grand Prix. On 25 July 2007 Spyker confirmed that the Japanese driver Sakon Yamamoto would compete in the remaining seven Grands Prix for them. On 31 July 2007, Scuderia Toro Rosso replaced Scott Speed with BMW test driver Sebastian Vettel following an alleged physical altercation between Speed and STR Team Principal Franz Tost. Vettel had made his debut that same season driving for BMW Sauber at the 2007 United States Grand Prix, replacing the injured Robert Kubica following his accident at the Canadian Grand Prix.

On 8 October 2007, Williams driver Alexander Wurz announced his immediate retirement from Formula One racing. Williams test driver Kazuki Nakajima replaced Wurz for the Brazilian Grand Prix.

=== Team changes ===
Ferrari technical director, Ross Brawn, was to take a sabbatical year for 2007, after ten seasons at the Italian team since 1997. However, it was later announced that he would leave the team. In 2008, Ross Brawn became Team Principal of the Honda team.

McLaren signed a title sponsorship deal with the telecommunications company Vodafone late in 2005. With the loss of Vodafone, Scuderia Ferrari began a sponsorship deal with Alice, a brand of Telecom Italia.

Mild Seven confirmed that they would not renew their contract with Renault following its conclusion at the end of 2006 due to current European tobacco laws.

British American Tobacco's Lucky Strike and 555 brands ceased to sponsor the Honda team, following which the team ran a sponsorless livery in 2007.

Williams changed their engines from Cosworth to Toyota in a three-year deal until 2009. Contrary to speculation at the time, the engines were not rebadged as Lexus.

Red Bull officially became an Austrian constructor by receiving an Austrian licence, though continued to operate from the same base in Britain.

On 9 September 2006, MF1 Racing was officially sold to a Dutch-Arab consortium owned by Michiel Mol, along with the aid of Spyker Cars. The team was officially renamed Spyker MF1 Team, keeping the MF1 for the rest of the season due to Concorde Agreement rules. On 30 September 2006, Spyker announced that their engine supplier would be Ferrari.

On 16 October 2006, Renault confirmed that the Dutch banking company ING would become their main sponsor to replace Mild Seven, which has sponsored the Enstone-based team during the 13 years since 1994. On 20 October 2006, Williams announced AT&T as their new main sponsor. On 24 October 2006, Spyker announced they would change their name from Spyker MF1 Team to Spyker F1 from 2007 onwards, subject to all other teams giving their agreement. On 31 October 2006, Red Bull confirmed their engine situation for 2007. Renault engines were used by Red Bull Racing, while Scuderia Toro Rosso used 2006-spec Ferrari engines. As a result of Red Bull Racing switching to Renault engines, this marked the first time Renault had supplied more than one team in the sport since the 1997 season (when it supplied Williams and Benetton) as a fully-fledged engine manufacturer (although from 1998 to 2000 Renault had supplied more than one team but under Mecachrome, Playlife and Supertec brandings respectively). As a result of Spyker and Toro Rosso switching to Ferrari customer engines, this marked the first time Ferrari had supplied more than two teams in the sport since the 2001 season when it used Petronas branding for the engines it supplied to Sauber and Acer branding for the engines it supplied to Prost.

On 15 March 2007, Spyker announced their new title sponsor for the 2007 season: United Arab Emirates airline company Etihad Airways.

=== Other changes ===
On 30 September 2006, Cosworth announced that they would temporarily withdraw from Formula One as an engine supplier, citing lack of room for supplying engines for private teams after Williams switched to Toyota engines and Spyker opted for Ferrari engines from 2007 season onwards and thus for the first time since 1962 a Formula One season did not feature Cosworth-powered cars. However the company would return to the sport from 2010 season onwards.

== Calendar ==
Round	Grand Prix	Circuit	Date
1	Australian Grand Prix	(Australia) Albert Park Circuit, Melbourne	18 March
2	Malaysian Grand Prix	(Malaysia) Sepang International Circuit, Kuala Lumpur	8 April
3	Bahrain Grand Prix	Bahrain International Circuit, Sakhir	15 April
4	Spanish Grand Prix	(Spain) Circuit de Catalunya, Montmeló	13 May
5	Monaco Grand Prix	Circuit de Monaco, Monte-Carlo	27 May
6	Canadian Grand Prix	(Canada) Circuit Gilles Villeneuve, Montreal	10 June
7	United States Grand Prix	(United States) Indianapolis Motor Speedway, Speedway	17 June
8	French Grand Prix	(France) Circuit de Nevers Magny-Cours, Magny-Cours	1 July
9	British Grand Prix	(United Kingdom) Silverstone Circuit, Silverstone	8 July
10	European Grand Prix	(Germany) Nürburgring, Nürburg	22 July
11	Hungarian Grand Prix	(Hungary) Hungaroring, Mogyoród	5 August
12	Turkish Grand Prix	(Turkey) Istanbul Park, Istanbul	26 August
13	Italian Grand Prix	(Italy) Autodromo Nazionale di Monza, Monza	9 September
14	Belgian Grand Prix	(Belgium) Circuit de Spa-Francorchamps, Stavelot	16 September
15	Japanese Grand Prix	(Japan) Fuji Speedway, Oyama, Shizuoka	30 September
16	Chinese Grand Prix	(China) Shanghai International Circuit, Shanghai	7 October
17	Brazilian Grand Prix	(Brazil) Autódromo José Carlos Pace, São Paulo	21 October

On 29 August 2006, the FIA published a provisional calendar for the 2007 FIA Formula One World Championship. The San Marino and European Grands Prix were excluded, although the European round would later make a comeback (see below). The final calendar (above), which confirmed that the San Marino Grand Prix would not return, was released on 18 October 2006.

For the first time in nearly half a century, no German Grand Prix was held as a result of the circuits previously hosting a Grand Prix in Germany beginning to alternate in organizing the German Grand Prix. However, the promoter for the Hockenheim race controlled the rights to the descriptor "German Grand Prix" and an agreement could not be reached between them and the Nürburgring circuits for the naming rights. The Nürburgring event therefore retained its usual European Grand Prix title.

After twenty years of being hosted at the Honda-owned Suzuka Circuit since 1987, the Japanese Grand Prix moved to Toyota's rebuilt Fuji Speedway, a circuit that F1 had not raced at since 1977.

The Belgian Grand Prix at Spa-Francorchamps returned after a one-year absence in 2006 due to track maintenance.

For the first time since 1975, no country hosted more than one Grand Prix.

== Changes ==
=== Regulation changes ===
- Although the FIA had planned to mandate a single regulation tyre manufacturer from 2008, Bridgestone was the sole supplier in 2007, after Michelin ended their participation in Formula One at the end of the 2006 season. Revised Sporting Regulations meant a total of 14 sets of dry weather tyres per driver would be available over each race weekend: four sets for Friday only, and 10 for the rest of the weekend. During the race both compounds of tyre (hard and soft) had to be used at least once. At the first round in Australia soft tyres were marked with a white spot. However, this was difficult to see when the car was in motion and from the second round in Malaysia onwards one of the four grooves in the soft compound tyre was painted white.

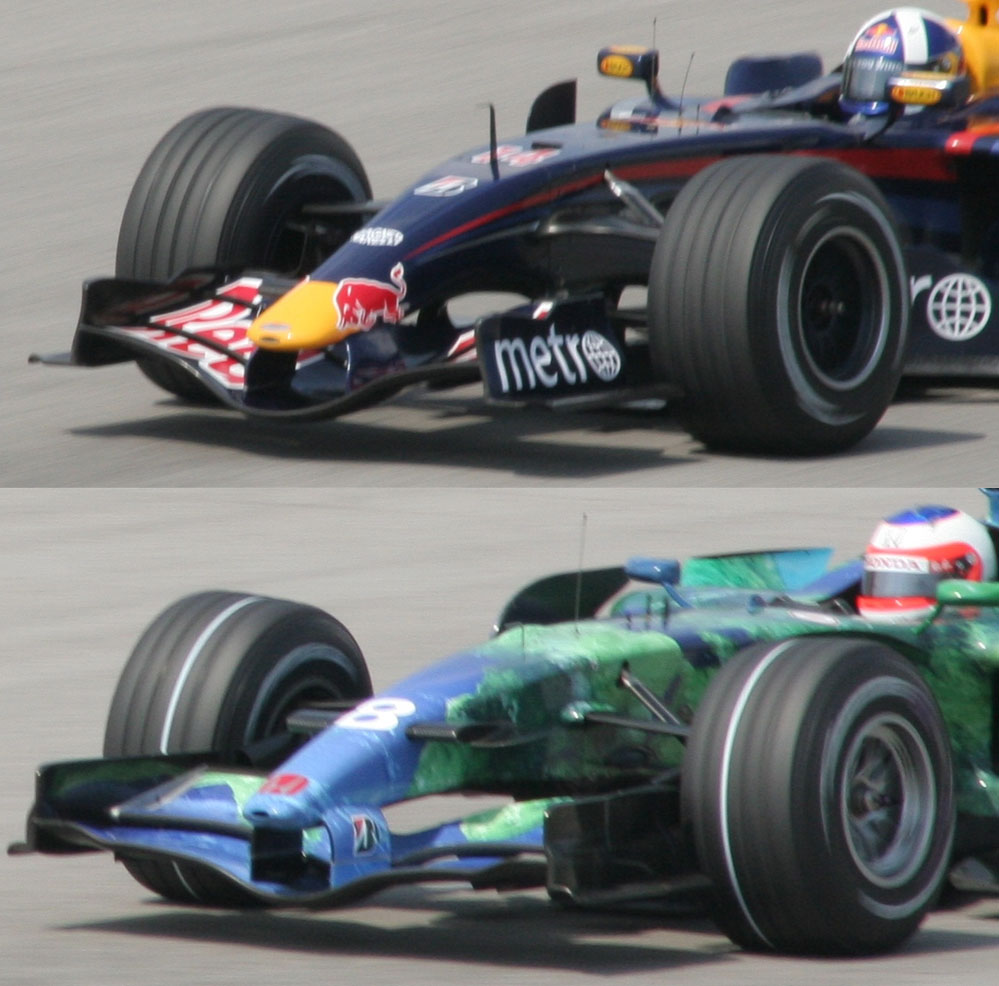
Top: harder tyre (officially named the 'prime' tyre). Bottom: softer tyre (the 'option' tyre), at the Malaysian Grand Prix.

- The teams finishing 5th–11th in the previous season's Constructors' Championship were no longer allowed to run a third car on Friday following a rule change. The teams that finish 1st–4th were already banned from doing so.
- Engine development was frozen from the 2006 Japanese Grand Prix, with these engines being used for the whole of 2007 and 2008. This was described as engine "homologation" by the FIA. It was previously set to be introduced in 2008.
- All cars were fitted with red, blue and yellow cockpit lights. The purpose was to give drivers information concerning track signals or conditions. The lights had to be LEDs each with a minimum diameter of 5 mm and which were fitted so as to be directly in the driver's normal line of sight.
- In order to give rescue crews an immediate indication of accident severity, each car had to be fitted with a warning light which was connected to the FIA data logger. The light had to face upwards and be recessed into the top of the survival cell no more than 150 mm from the car centre line and the front of the cockpit opening and as near to the marshal neutral switch as is practical.
- The two Friday practice sessions were expanded from 60 minutes to 90 minutes. All teams were allowed to use two cars, which could be driven by either the two race drivers or a nominated third driver.
- The engine penalty was only applied in the second day of the Grand Prix weekend. Any engine change in the first day was not penalised.
- No car was allowed to enter the pits to refuel during a safety car period until all cars were in the group following the safety car and they were advised that the pit lane was open. This prevented drivers from racing to the pits immediately after a safety car was deployed. In addition, any lapped cars in front of a car on the lead lap were required to pass the safety car and restart at the end of the line-up instead of maintaining their physical position.
- The Formula One teams unanimously agreed to the voluntary early introduction of the testing agreement scheduled for 2008. This limited each team to an annual limit of 30,000 kilometres (19,000 mi).
- The team's second car had to run with a yellow coloured roll bar instead of a black one. The first cars continued running with a red/orange roll bar. This was intended to help spectators distinguish between first and second cars at further distances.
- As Scuderia Toro Rosso switched to Ferrari 056 engines, all Formula One entrants began using the mandated 2.4-litre V8 naturally-aspirated engines for the first time after one year the V10 engine was an option in 2006.
- Due to a decision taken in 2006, tobacco advertising promoting smoking products was banned from car liveries.

=== Television coverage ===
- Formula One Management became the sole host broadcaster for all but three of the 17 Grands Prix in 2007. All coverage was produced in anamorphic 16:9 widescreen for the first time.
- ITV Sport, Premiere, ORF1, RTL7, TF1, TV3 and Polsat were among the first broadcasters to provide a standard 16:9 widescreen programme at the opening race in Australia.
- For the United States TV coverage, except Speed Channel, FOX also broadcast four Formula One races. Those were the Canadian Grand Prix, United States Grand Prix, French Grand Prix and British Grand Prix. The Canadian Grand Prix and United States Grand Prix were televised live.
- In Poland, F1 broadcast was moved into Polsat from TV4.
- In Portugal, SportTV became the broadcaster, replacing RTP1.

=== Circuits ===
- A new chicane was inserted into the straight between Europcar and New Holland (final corner) at the Circuit de Catalunya, Barcelona. It was installed in order to slow the cars down before the long main straight, and with the intent that it would provide more overtaking opportunities into turn 1.
- Spa underwent track changes as well, with a new paddock area, a reprofiled Bus Stop Chicane, an extension of the start-finish straight and a change to La Source hairpin.
- The largest-scale repair in the last 35 years was done to Autódromo José Carlos Pace in São Paulo, Brazil, to fundamentally solve the problem of the asphalt. All present asphalt was removed and replaced with new asphalt. At the same time, the pit lane entrance was enhanced to improve safety. The circuit was closed and no event was held for five months to allow work, from June to October, until immediately before the event.

== Pre-season ==
Pre-season testing began in November 2006 at the Bahrain International Circuit, and February 2007 at the Circuit de Catalunya, with ten of the eleven teams participating in the test sessions. The most notable absentees were Fernando Alonso and Kimi Räikkönen, who were still under contract at Renault and McLaren respectively. Jenson Button was also absent as he had suffered a hairline fracture on his ribs after a go-karting accident in preparations for the November tests. Lewis Hamilton made his first appearance in a McLaren since being confirmed as Alonso's teammate for 2007.

Felipe Massa topped the times on the first two days of testing. Massa's testing partner, Luca Badoer, took the fastest time on the third day, although interest was on the fact that double World Champion Mika Häkkinen joined Hamilton and de la Rosa at McLaren for a one-off test, although the Finnish driver was over three seconds slower than Badoer's time, completing 79 laps of the Spanish circuit.

The other big story of 2007 was the return to a single tyre supplier (Bridgestone). It was perceived that this accounted for some of the reason why Ferrari led the early tests, although it was claimed by Bridgestone that the 2007 tyre is of a completely new build, thus minimising any real benefit for the 2006 Bridgestone teams (Ferrari, Toyota, Williams, Midland/Spyker and Super Aguri).

Toyota was the only team out for the fourth day of testing at Barcelona, as the Japanese works team chose to miss the first day of testing. Both Ralf Schumacher and Jarno Trulli's fastest laps were quicker than Massa and Badoer's times during the previous three sessions. Testing resumed on 6 December at Jerez, with the majority of teams attending the session. Both Ferraris of Massa and Badoer were first and second fastest, with McLaren's Lewis Hamilton making up the top three in third. Hamilton improved on his position the following day by taking the fastest time, a second faster than Renault's Giancarlo Fisichella.

Japanese works teams Honda and Toyota topped the times for the next two days of testing: Honda's Rubens Barrichello and Toyota's Franck Montagny were fastest, although Toyota had the Jerez track to themselves when Montagny took the fastest time. Heikki Kovalainen and Pedro de la Rosa took the fastest times on the fourth and fifth day of testing at Jerez. Also of note, on the last day of testing Fernando Alonso made his McLaren testing debut after an agreement with manager Flavio Briatore. This did not call for an end to his agreement (which ended on 31 December).

== Season report ==
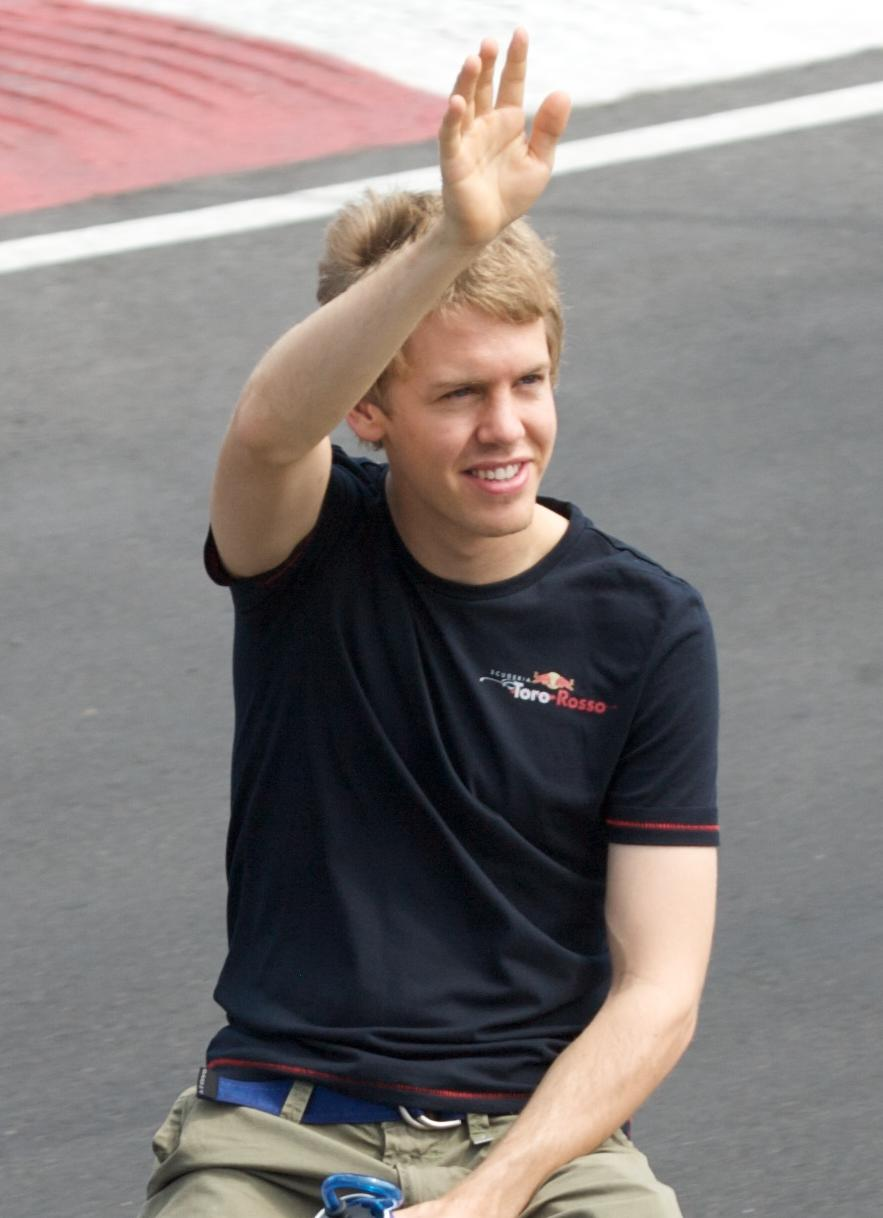
Sebastian Vettel (pictured in 2008) made his Formula One debut for BMW Sauber before completing the season with Toro Rosso.

The season started at Albert Park in Australia on 18 March. Kimi Räikkönen led the whole race, and became the fourth driver to win on their debut for Ferrari. Fernando Alonso came second and debutant Lewis Hamilton finished 3rd. Felipe Massa took his first pole of the season in Malaysia but Alonso won his first race with McLaren while Hamilton finished second. Massa led the entire race to win in both Bahrain and Spain, and in both races Hamilton finished second, becoming the first rookie to finish on the podium in more than his first two outings. McLaren dominated Monaco with Alonso winning from Hamilton after the pair had lapped everybody apart from themselves and Felipe Massa, who was not too far from being lapped.

The Canadian GP included four safety car periods and one of the biggest crashes of Formula One in that era. The race started off with the second all-McLaren front row with Hamilton taking his first pole position followed by Alonso. Alonso made a mistake in turn 1, losing several places while Hamilton was opening a gap between himself and Nick Heidfeld. On lap 22 the first safety car period began after Adrian Sutil hit the concrete wall. The safety car went into the pits on lap 28 but before the lap could be completed Robert Kubica had a massive accident. He had lost his front wing after hitting Jarno Trulli. He then went wide and hit a bump on the grass that launched him into the air and into a violent impact with the retaining barrier at a peak deceleration of 75G. The safety car was once again deployed and went in on lap 35. Hamilton once again opened up a gap to second-placed Heidfeld until lap 50 when Christijan Albers left a lot of debris on the track after a crash forcing the deployment of the safety car. The race restarted on lap 55 and the safety car was deployed again on lap 56 after Vitantonio Liuzzi hit the so-called 'Wall of Champions'. The safety car period was extended after Jarno Trulli hit the tyre barrier at the exit of the pitlane after trying to catch up with the field. On the restart Hamilton led to the finish to claim his maiden win in his sixth race. The next race at Indianapolis saw Hamilton lead from the start until victory after a 300 km/h side by side battle with Alonso for the lead. Ferrari took their first 1–2 finish of the season in France with Kimi Räikkönen winning from polesitter, Felipe Massa.

In Britain Hamilton took his third pole position, going on to finish a distant third behind winner Kimi Räikkönen and Fernando Alonso. Europe (Germany) would see Hamilton's run of nine consecutive podiums come to an end. After a large crash in qualifying he started in 10th in the race. On lap 4 he aquaplaned off the circuit in a torrential rainstorm but the race was stopped. He restarted after his car was pulled out of the gravel but after taking a gamble to change early to dry tyres on a drying track, he spun off several times but recovered to finish 9th, just missing out on the final point.

Hamilton and Alonso variously led the championship from the second until the final race of the season, when Räikkönen claimed the crown

After a qualifying incident between Alonso and Hamilton in which Alonso prevented Hamilton from completing his final flying lap, Alonso was demoted to 6th on the grid at the Hungarian Grand Prix while McLaren was made ineligible for points for the constructors' championship for that race. Hamilton then took victory with Räikkönen coming second. In Turkey Felipe Massa took a dominant victory followed by Räikkönen and Alonso. Hamilton finished fifth after he suffered a tyre failure while running in 3rd. In Italy Alonso won from Hamilton followed by Räikkönen. Following that Grand Prix McLaren was excluded from the constructors' championship after having been found guilty of theft and illegal usage of confidentional technical information of Ferrari. The team did not receive any constructors' points from subsequent races. In Belgium Räikkönen won from Massa and Alonso, thus allowing Ferrari to clinch the world constructors' championship from BMW Sauber following McLaren's exclusion.

The Japanese Grand Prix moved to Fuji Speedway. The event was marked by treacherous weather and was started behind the safety car. Lewis Hamilton survived a brush with Robert Kubica to win from Heikki Kovalainen and Kimi Räikkönen. At the last three corners Kubica and Felipe Massa ran side by side in a battle for 6th, while Fernando Alonso aquaplaned and crashed on lap 41 of 67. In China, Hamilton won his 6th pole of the season and led up to lap 28 when he was overtaken by Räikkönen and he then spun off entering the pitlane. The season finale marked the first time since 1986 that three drivers had a chance of becoming World Champion at the season finale, and the first time since the inaugural season in 1950 that the man who stood in third before the final race went on to win the championship (the driver in 1950 being Giuseppe Farina). Hamilton was the favourite with 107 points followed by Alonso with 103 points and Räikkönen with 100 points. Hamilton started 2nd but dropped to the back of the pack after a gearbox problem. He recovered to 7th but Räikkönen won the race and the championship. The final standings were Räikkönen with 110 points followed by Hamilton and Alonso each with 109 points. Räikkönen's late charge, following worse luck at the start of the season, would narrowly give him the World Drivers' Championship. With Hamilton and Alonso level on points their positions were determined by countback. Each driver had won four races, but Hamilton had five second-place finishes to Alonso's four, so he was awarded second place in the Championship, with Alonso third.

== Results and standings ==
=== Grands Prix ===
Round	Grand Prix	Pole position	Fastest lap	Winning driver	Winning constructor	Report
1	(Australia) Australian Grand Prix	(Finland) Kimi Räikkönen	(Finland) Kimi Räikkönen	(Finland) Kimi Räikkönen	(Italy) Ferrari	Report
2	(Malaysia) Malaysian Grand Prix	(Brazil) Felipe Massa	(United Kingdom) Lewis Hamilton	(Spain) Fernando Alonso	(United Kingdom) McLaren-Mercedes	Report
3	Bahrain Grand Prix	(Brazil) Felipe Massa	(Brazil) Felipe Massa	(Brazil) Felipe Massa	(Italy) Ferrari	Report
4	(Spain) Spanish Grand Prix	(Brazil) Felipe Massa	(Brazil) Felipe Massa	(Brazil) Felipe Massa	(Italy) Ferrari	Report
5	Monaco Grand Prix	(Spain) Fernando Alonso	(Spain) Fernando Alonso	(Spain) Fernando Alonso	(United Kingdom) McLaren-Mercedes	Report
6	(Canada) Canadian Grand Prix	(United Kingdom) Lewis Hamilton	(Spain) Fernando Alonso	(United Kingdom) Lewis Hamilton	(United Kingdom) McLaren-Mercedes	Report
7	United States Grand Prix	(United Kingdom) Lewis Hamilton	(Finland) Kimi Räikkönen	(United Kingdom) Lewis Hamilton	(United Kingdom) McLaren-Mercedes	Report
8	(France) French Grand Prix	(Brazil) Felipe Massa	(Brazil) Felipe Massa	(Finland) Kimi Räikkönen	(Italy) Ferrari	Report
9	(United Kingdom) British Grand Prix	(United Kingdom) Lewis Hamilton	(Finland) Kimi Räikkönen	(Finland) Kimi Räikkönen	(Italy) Ferrari	Report
10	(Germany) European Grand Prix	(Finland) Kimi Räikkönen	(Brazil) Felipe Massa	(Spain) Fernando Alonso	(United Kingdom) McLaren-Mercedes	Report
11	(Hungary) Hungarian Grand Prix	(United Kingdom) Lewis Hamilton (Note: Fernando Alonso qualified in pole position but was demoted 5 places due to blocking Lewis Hamilton in the pit lane. Lewis Hamilton was recognised as the pole-sitter for the race.)	(Finland) Kimi Räikkönen	(United Kingdom) Lewis Hamilton	(United Kingdom) McLaren-Mercedes (Note: McLaren were not awarded Constructors' Championship points nor a trophy on the podium.)	Report
12	(Turkey) Turkish Grand Prix	(Brazil) Felipe Massa	(Finland) Kimi Räikkönen	(Brazil) Felipe Massa	(Italy) Ferrari	Report
13	(Italy) Italian Grand Prix	(Spain) Fernando Alonso	(Spain) Fernando Alonso	(Spain) Fernando Alonso	(United Kingdom) McLaren-Mercedes (Note: McLaren were not allowed to have a team representative on the podium other than a driver.)	Report
14	(Belgium) Belgian Grand Prix	(Finland) Kimi Räikkönen	(Brazil) Felipe Massa	(Finland) Kimi Räikkönen	(Italy) Ferrari	Report
15	(Japan) Japanese Grand Prix	(United Kingdom) Lewis Hamilton	(United Kingdom) Lewis Hamilton	(United Kingdom) Lewis Hamilton	(United Kingdom) McLaren-Mercedes	Report
16	(China) Chinese Grand Prix	(United Kingdom) Lewis Hamilton	(Brazil) Felipe Massa	(Finland) Kimi Räikkönen	(Italy) Ferrari	Report
17	(Brazil) Brazilian Grand Prix	(Brazil) Felipe Massa	(Finland) Kimi Räikkönen	(Finland) Kimi Räikkönen	(Italy) Ferrari	Report

=== Scoring system ===
Points were awarded to the top eight classified finishers using the following structure:

Position	1st	2nd	3rd	4th	5th	6th	7th	8th
Points	10	8	6	5	4	3	2	1

=== World Drivers' Championship standings ===
Pos.	Driver	AUS (Australia)	MAL (Malaysia)	BHR (Bahrain)	ESP (Spain)	MON (Monaco)	CAN (Canada)	USA (United States)	FRA (France)	GBR (United Kingdom)	EUR (Germany)	HUN (Hungary)	TUR (Turkey)	ITA (Italy)	BEL (Belgium)	JPN (Japan)	CHN (China)	BRA (Brazil)	Points
1	(Finland) Kimi Räikkönen	1^{P}^{F}	3	3	Ret	8	5	4^{F}	1	1^{F}	Ret^{P}	2^{F}	2^{F}	3	1^{P}	3	1	1^{F}	110
2	(United Kingdom) Lewis Hamilton	3	2^{F}	2	2	2	1^{P}	1^{P}	3	3^{P}	9	1^{P}	5	2	4	1^{P}^{F}	Ret^{P}	7	109
3	(Spain) Fernando Alonso	2	1	5	3	1^{P}^{F}	7^{F}	2	7	2	1	4	3	1^{P}^{F}	3	Ret	2	3	109
4	(Brazil) Felipe Massa	6	5^{P}	1^{P}^{F}	1^{P}^{F}	3	DSQ	3	2^{P}^{F}	5	2^{F}	13	1^{P}	Ret	2^{F}	6	3^{F}	2^{P}	94
5	(Germany) Nick Heidfeld	4	4	4	Ret	6	2	Ret	5	6	6	3	4	4	5	14^{†}	7	6	61
6	(Poland) Robert Kubica	Ret	18	6	4	5	Ret		4	4	7	5	8	5	9	7	Ret	5	39
7	(Finland) Heikki Kovalainen	10	8	9	7	13^{†}	4	5	15	7	8	8	6	7	8	2	9	Ret	30
8	(Italy) Giancarlo Fisichella	5	6	8	9	4	DSQ	9	6	8	10	12	9	12	Ret	5	11	Ret	21
9	(Germany) Nico Rosberg	7	Ret	10	6	12	10	16^{†}	9	12	Ret	7	7	6	6	Ret	16	4	20
10	(United Kingdom) David Coulthard	Ret	Ret	Ret	5	14	Ret	Ret	13	11	5	11	10	Ret	Ret	4	8	9	14
11	(Austria) Alexander Wurz	Ret	9	11	Ret	7	3	10	14	13	4	14	11	13	Ret	Ret	12		13
12	(Australia) Mark Webber	13	10	Ret	Ret	Ret	9	7	12	Ret	3	9	Ret	9	7	Ret	10	Ret	10
13	(Italy) Jarno Trulli	9	7	7	Ret	15	Ret	6	Ret	Ret	13	10	16	11	11	13	13	8	8
14	(Germany) Sebastian Vettel							8				16	19	18	Ret	Ret	4	Ret	6
15	(United Kingdom) Jenson Button	15	12	Ret	12	11	Ret	12	8	10	Ret	Ret	13	8	Ret	11^{†}	5	Ret	6
16	(Germany) Ralf Schumacher	8	15	12	Ret	16	8	Ret	10	Ret	Ret	6	12	15	10	Ret	Ret	11	5
17	(Japan) Takuma Sato	12	13	Ret	8	17	6	Ret	16	14	Ret	15	18	16	15	15^{†}	14	12	4
18	(Italy) Vitantonio Liuzzi	14	17	Ret	Ret	Ret	Ret	17^{†}	Ret	16^{†}	Ret	Ret	15	17	12	9	6	13	3
19	(Germany) Adrian Sutil	17	Ret	15	13	Ret	Ret	14	17	Ret	Ret	17	21^{†}	19	14	8	Ret	Ret	1
20	(Brazil) Rubens Barrichello	11	11	13	10	10	12	Ret	11	9	11	18	17	10	13	10	15	Ret	0
21	(United States) Scott Speed	Ret	14	Ret	Ret	9	Ret	13	Ret	Ret	Ret								0
22	(Japan) Kazuki Nakajima																	10	0
23	(United Kingdom) Anthony Davidson	16	16	16^{†}	11	18	11	11	Ret	Ret	12	Ret	14	14	16	Ret	Ret	14	0
24	(Japan) Sakon Yamamoto											Ret	20	20	17	12	17	Ret	0
25	(Netherlands) Christijan Albers	Ret	Ret	14	14	19^{†}	Ret	15	Ret	15									0
—	(Germany) Markus Winkelhock										Ret								0
Pos.	Driver	AUS (Australia)	MAL (Malaysia)	BHR (Bahrain)	ESP (Spain)	MON (Monaco)	CAN (Canada)	USA (United States)	FRA (France)	GBR (United Kingdom)	EUR (Germany)	HUN (Hungary)	TUR (Turkey)	ITA (Italy)	BEL (Belgium)	JPN (Japan)	CHN (China)	BRA (Brazil)	Points

Key
Colour	Result
Gold	Winner
Silver	Second place
Bronze	Third place
Green	Other points position
Blue	Other classified position
Blue	Not classified, finished (NC)
Purple	Not classified, retired (Ret)
Red	Did not qualify (DNQ)
Black	Disqualified (DSQ)
White	Did not start (DNS)
White	Race cancelled (C)
Blank	Did not practice (DNP)
Blank	Excluded (EX)
Blank	Did not arrive (DNA)
Blank	Withdrawn (WD)
Blank	Did not enter (empty cell)
Annotation	Meaning
P	Pole position
F	Fastest lap

Notes:

- † – Drivers did not finish the Grand Prix, but were classified as they completed more than 90% of the race distance.

=== World Constructors' Championship standings ===
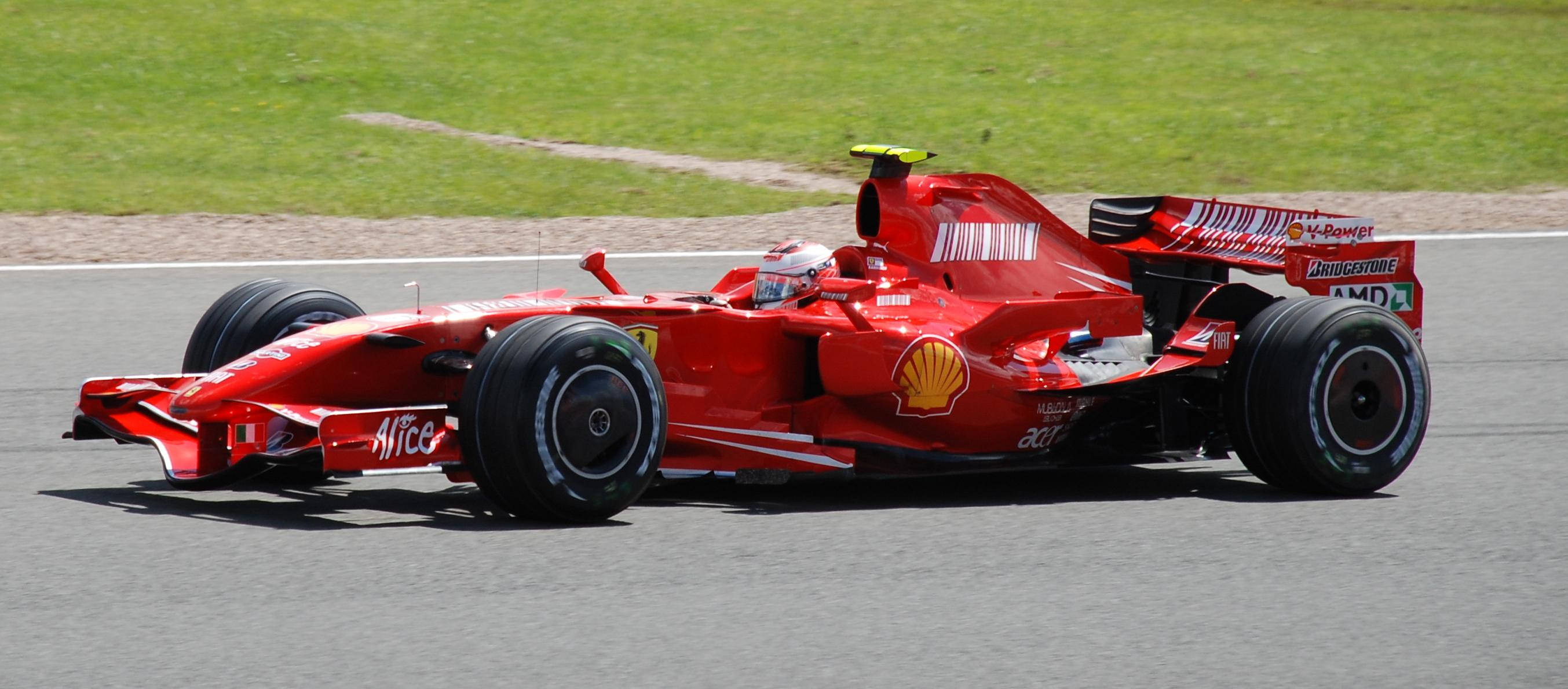
Scuderia Ferrari won the Constructors' Championship with the Ferrari F2007

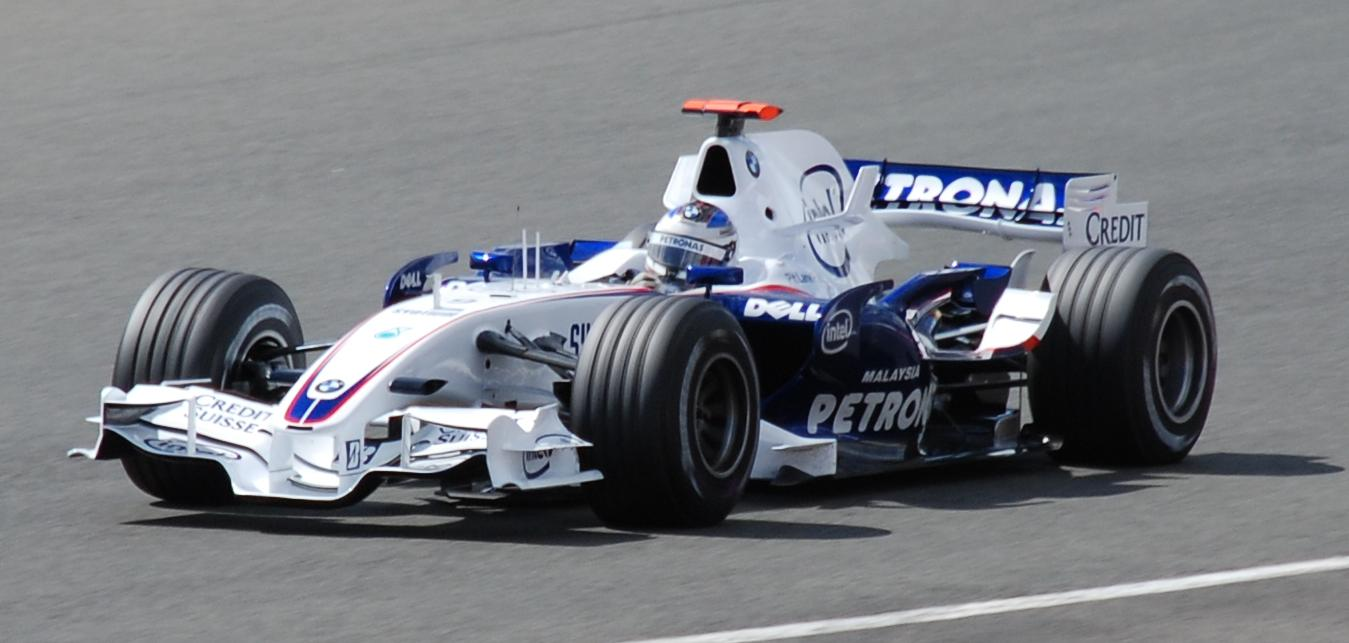
BMW Sauber F1 Team placed second in the Constructors' Championship with the BMW Sauber F1.07

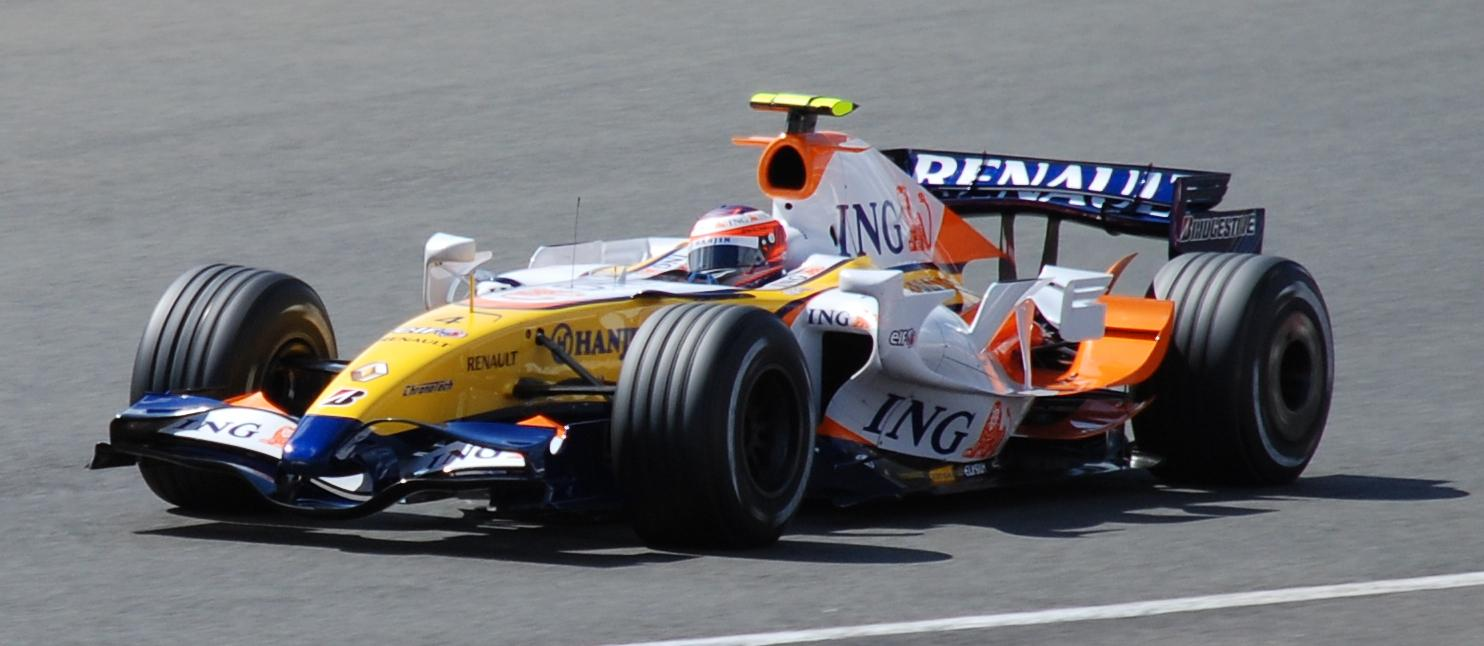
Renault, the defending Constructors' Champion, placed third in the Constructors' Championship with the Renault R27

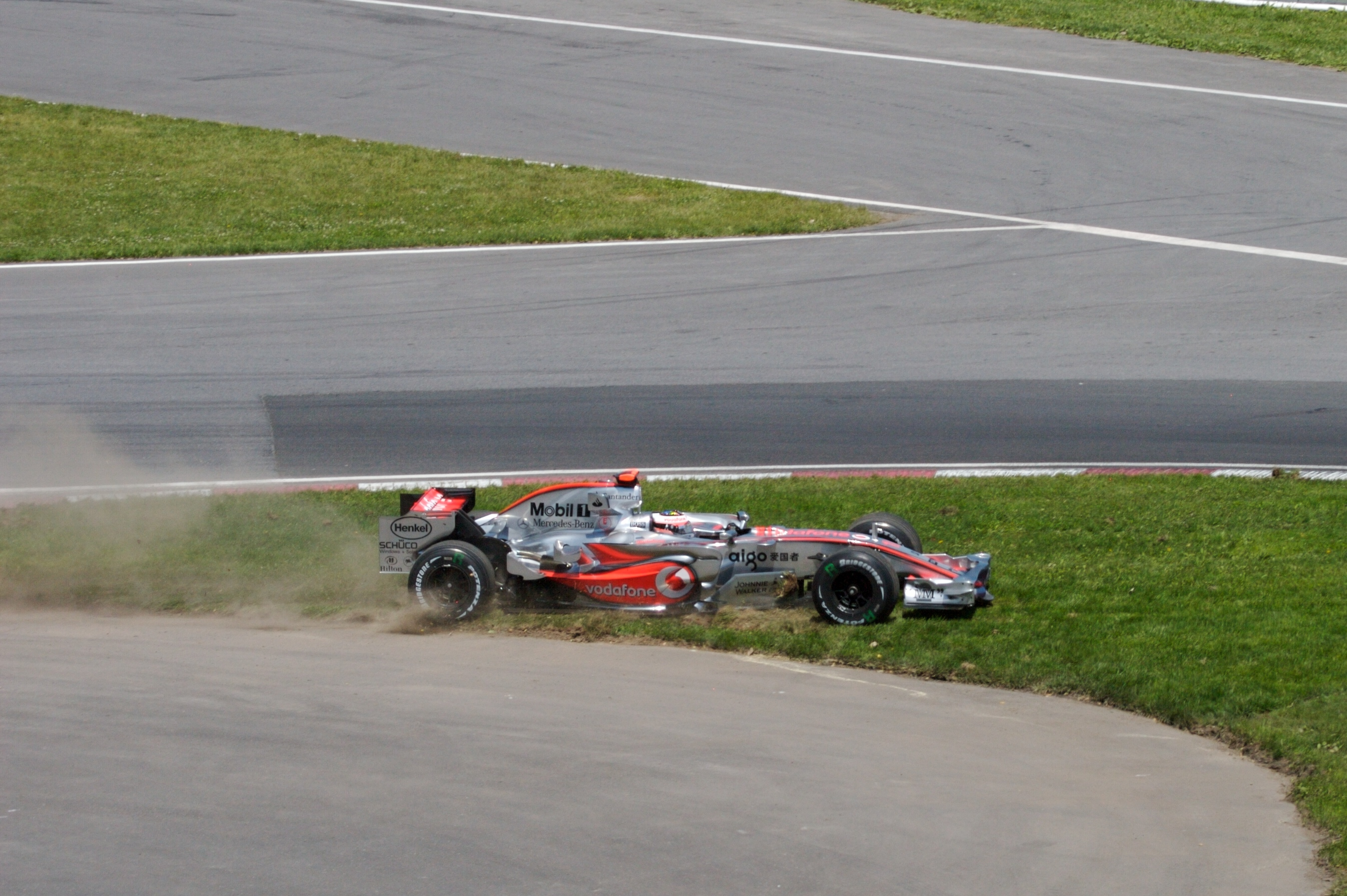
Although its drivers scored the most points combined, McLaren were excluded from the Constructors' Championship

Pos.	Constructor	No.	AUS (Australia)	MAL (Malaysia)	BHR (Bahrain)	ESP (Spain)	MON (Monaco)	CAN (Canada)	USA (United States)	FRA (France)	GBR (United Kingdom)	EUR (Germany)	HUN (Hungary)	TUR (Turkey)	ITA (Italy)	BEL (Belgium)	JPN (Japan)	CHN (China)	BRA (Brazil)	Points
1	(Italy) Ferrari	5	6	5^{P}	1^{P}^{F}	1^{P}^{F}	3	DSQ	3	2^{P}^{F}	5	2^{F}	13	1^{P}	Ret	2^{F}	6	3^{F}	2^{P}	204
1	(Italy) Ferrari	6	1^{P}^{F}	3	3	Ret	8	5	4^{F}	1	1^{F}	Ret^{P}	2^{F}	2^{F}	3	1^{P}	3	1	1^{F}	204
2	(Germany) BMW Sauber	9	4	4	4	Ret	6	2	Ret	5	6	6	3	4	4	5	14^{†}	7	6	101
2	(Germany) BMW Sauber	10	Ret	18	6	4	5	Ret	8	4	4	7	5	8	5	9	7	Ret	5	101
3	(France) Renault	3	5	6	8	9	4	DSQ	9	6	8	10	12	9	12	Ret	5	11	Ret	51
3	(France) Renault	4	10	8	9	7	13^{†}	4	5	15	7	8	8	6	7	8	2	9	Ret	51
4	(United Kingdom) Williams-Toyota	16	7	Ret	10	6	12	10	16^{†}	9	12	Ret	7	7	6	6	Ret	16	4	33
4	(United Kingdom) Williams-Toyota	17	Ret	9	11	Ret	7	3	10	14	13	4	14	11	13	Ret	Ret	12	10	33
5	(Austria) Red Bull-Renault	14	Ret	Ret	Ret	5	14	Ret	Ret	13	11	5	11	10	Ret	Ret	4	8	9	24
5	(Austria) Red Bull-Renault	15	13	10	Ret	Ret	Ret	9	7	12	Ret	3	9	Ret	9	7	Ret	10	Ret	24
6	(Japan) Toyota	11	8	15	12	Ret	16	8	Ret	10	Ret	Ret	6	12	15	10	Ret	Ret	11	13
6	(Japan) Toyota	12	9	7	7	Ret	15	Ret	6	Ret	Ret	13	10	16	11	11	13	13	8	13
7	(Italy) Toro Rosso-Ferrari	18	14	17	Ret	Ret	Ret	Ret	17^{†}	Ret	16^{†}	Ret	Ret	15	17	12	9	6	13	8
7	(Italy) Toro Rosso-Ferrari	19	Ret	14	Ret	Ret	9	Ret	13	Ret	Ret	Ret	16	19	18	Ret	Ret	4	Ret	8
8	(Japan) Honda	7	15	12	Ret	12	11	Ret	12	8	10	Ret	Ret	13	8	Ret	11^{†}	5	Ret	6
8	(Japan) Honda	8	11	11	13	10	10	12	Ret	11	9	11	18	17	10	13	10	15	Ret	6
9	(Japan) Super Aguri-Honda	22	12	13	Ret	8	17	6	Ret	16	14	Ret	15	18	16	15	15^{†}	14	12	4
9	(Japan) Super Aguri-Honda	23	16	16	16^{†}	11	18	11	11	Ret	Ret	12	Ret	14	14	16	Ret	Ret	14	4
10	(Netherlands) Spyker-Ferrari	20	17	Ret	15	13	Ret	Ret	14	17	Ret	Ret	17	21^{†}	19	14	8	Ret	Ret	1
10	(Netherlands) Spyker-Ferrari	21	Ret	Ret	14	14	19^{†}	Ret	15	Ret	15	Ret	Ret	20	20	17	12	17	Ret	1
EX	(United Kingdom) McLaren-Mercedes	1	2	1	5	3	1^{P}^{F}	7^{F}	2	7	2	1	4 (Note: After an incident at the end of Qualifying Session 3 at the Hungarian Grand Prix, an FIA decision was made that, due to team infringements during qualifying, McLaren would not be awarded any points. The drivers, however, would retain the points won for the Drivers' Championship. This punishment was appealed by the team, but they decided to retract it following a greater punishment later in the year.)	3	1^{P}^{F}	3	Ret	2	3	0 (Note: The World Motorsport Council disqualified McLaren from the 2007 Constructors' Championship as punishment for the 2007 Formula One espionage controversy. McLaren was stripped of its Constructors' Championship points, and Formula One's website states that the team scored zero points in 2007. At the time McLaren was disqualified (prior to the 2007 Belgian Grand Prix, with four rounds left in the season), McLaren led the Constructors' Championship with 166 points to Ferrari's 143. The two McLaren drivers were not disqualified from the Drivers' Championship, and they collectively scored 218 points. However, earlier in the season, McLaren had received a 15-point deduction due to a separate controversy at the 2007 Hungarian Grand Prix. As such, in the purely hypothetical circumstance that McLaren (1) was not disqualified from the Constructors' Championship, (2) recorded the exact same results that it did in real life, (3) lost its appeal of the Hungary deduction, and (4) did not receive a second points penalty in lieu of the season disqualification, McLaren would have scored 203 points, one point behind Ferrari.)
EX	(United Kingdom) McLaren-Mercedes	2	3	2^{F}	2	2	2	1^{P}	1^{P}	3	3^{P}	9	1^{P}	5	2	4	1^{P}^{F}	Ret^{P}	7	0
Pos.	Constructor	No.	AUS (Australia)	MAL (Malaysia)	BHR (Bahrain)	ESP (Spain)	MON (Monaco)	CAN (Canada)	USA (United States)	FRA (France)	GBR (United Kingdom)	EUR (Germany)	HUN (Hungary)	TUR (Turkey)	ITA (Italy)	BEL (Belgium)	JPN (Japan)	CHN (China)	BRA (Brazil)	Points

Key
Colour	Result
Gold	Winner
Silver	Second place
Bronze	Third place
Green	Other points position
Blue	Other classified position
Blue	Not classified, finished (NC)
Purple	Not classified, retired (Ret)
Red	Did not qualify (DNQ)
Black	Disqualified (DSQ)
White	Did not start (DNS)
White	Race cancelled (C)
Blank	Did not practice (DNP)
Blank	Excluded (EX)
Blank	Did not arrive (DNA)
Blank	Withdrawn (WD)
Blank	Did not enter (empty cell)
Annotation	Meaning
P	Pole position
F	Fastest lap

Notes:

- † – Drivers did not finish the Grand Prix, but were classified as they completed more than 90% of the race distance.
