= 2007 Hungarian Grand Prix =

Coordinates: 47°34′44″N 19°14′55″E

Race 11 of 17 in the 2007 Formula One World Championship
| ← Previous race | Next race → |
- Hungaroring (GP track)

Race details
- Date: 5 August 2007
- Official name: Formula 1 Magyar Nagydíj 2007
- Location: Hungaroring, Mogyoród, Pest, Hungary
- Course: Permanent racing facility
- Course length: 4.381 km (2.722 miles)
- Distance: 70 laps, 306.663 km (190.552 miles)
- Weather: Sunny, temperatures reaching up to 27 °C (81 °F)

Pole position
| Driver | (United Kingdom) Lewis Hamilton (Note: Hamilton originally qualified 2nd, but was promoted after Alonso received a penalty for blocking him during Q3.) | McLaren-Mercedes |
- Time: 1:19.781

Fastest lap
| Driver | (Finland) Kimi Räikkönen | Ferrari |
- Time: 1:20.047 on lap 70

Podium
| First | (United Kingdom) Lewis Hamilton | McLaren-Mercedes |
| Second | (Finland) Kimi Räikkönen | Ferrari |
| Third | (Germany) Nick Heidfeld | BMW Sauber |

The 2007 Hungarian Grand Prix (officially the Formula 1 Magyar Nagydíj 2007) was the eleventh race of the 2007 FIA Formula One World Championship and was held on 5 August 2007 at the Hungaroring racing track in Mogyoród, Pest, Hungary. It was also memorable for an incident in the Saturday qualifying session, between McLaren teammates Lewis Hamilton and Fernando Alonso.

Hamilton went into the race with a 2-point advantage in World Championship points over Alonso and was 11 points ahead of 3rd place man Felipe Massa after a chaotic European Grand Prix, whilst McLaren held a 27-point lead in the Constructors' Championship over their main rivals Ferrari. Ralf Schumacher scored his last World Championship points at this race.

Japanese former Super Aguri driver Sakon Yamamoto filled the second Spyker car, replacing European GP leader, German Markus Winkelhock. Sebastian Vettel, the youngest Grand Prix point scorer made his second Grand Prix start replacing Scott Speed at Scuderia Toro Rosso.

Controversy hit the qualifying sessions when Hamilton failed to honour an agreement to let Alonso past on track; this denied Alonso a competitive advantage when setting his lap time. Alonso then retaliated by holding Hamilton up in the pit lane, to in turn deny Hamilton a chance to record a final lap time. Stewards later dropped Alonso five places down the starting grid of the race, putting him in sixth while Hamilton started in pole position. McLaren were also told they would not score any Constructor's Championship points in the race and wouldn't be presented with a winning constructor's trophy on the podium if one of their drivers were to win the race. The team stated Hamilton's hold-up was not Alonso's fault (although Alonso gave the stewards a different explanation, that he was inquiring about his tyres), and that Hamilton had disobeyed team orders to let Alonso pass him, which put the two drivers out of sequence for their pit stops. McLaren had initially expressed their intent to appeal the Constructor's points penalty but ultimately withdrew their appeal after subsequently losing all their Constructor's points as penalty for the espionage scandal.

== Report ==
=== Practice ===
BMW's Robert Kubica was the fastest driver in the first of the practice sessions with a time of 1:22.390. He was followed by the two Ferraris of Felipe Massa and Kimi Räikkönen, and the two McLarens of Fernando Alonso and Lewis Hamilton. Friday's second session saw the two McLarens of Fernando Alonso and Lewis Hamilton in first and third, respectively, separated by Renault's Heikki Kovalainen. Fernando Alonso's time was 1:20.919. In Saturday's practice session Felipe Massa took first spot with a time of 1:20.183, followed by Fernando Alonso, Lewis Hamilton, Nick Heidfeld and then Kimi Räikkönen.

=== Qualifying ===
In the first qualifying session, Lewis Hamilton posted the fastest time with 1:19:570, which was the quickest time recorded in the weekend so far, being the only lap under 1:20. Hamilton and the rest of the front-runners led the way, and as the session ended Jenson Button, the 2006 winner, had bumped his Honda teammate Rubens Barrichello into the relegation zone. However, Button was soon beaten by Liuzzi. Joining the two Hondas were Takuma Sato, Sebastian Vettel, Adrian Sutil and Sakon Yamamoto.

In the second session, Jarno Trulli of Toyota led the pace early, but Hamilton and his teammate Alonso posted the best times. Massa and Kubica struggled to 11th and 12th places, but, Kubica's team put on new tyres and reached the top 10. Massa had worse luck; the Ferrari team weren't prepared for him to need a second run in Q2, and he was released into the pit-lane without being refuelled. His pit crew had to run down the pit-lane and pull him back to his pit to be refuelled, by which time his tyres had lost temperature so when he finally made it out, the lack of grip meant he was unable to improve his time. Joining Massa among the eliminated drivers were David Coulthard in 11th, Heikki Kovalainen in 12th, Alexander Wurz of Williams Toyota in 13th, 15th was Anthony Davidson, and 16th was Vitantonio Liuzzi.

Hamilton led out of the pit-lane at the beginning of Q3, followed by teammate Alonso. Hamilton set the quickest lap time the first time around, but was soon beaten by Nick Heidfeld. Around the 9-minute mark, Trulli was the first into the pits to change tyres. Alonso was next into the pits; at the time, he was ninth. All the others followed suit, and meaningful times were soon put in. Hamilton again impressed the crowd with another time below 1:20. Alonso and Kimi Räikkönen, the only remaining Ferrari driver, Nick Heidfeld, Kubica, and Trulli filed in behind. With around 2:30 remaining, Alonso again pitted for fresh tyres, along with almost every other driver. The McLaren crew held Alonso for around 20 seconds after the tyres were fitted, in a stated attempt to give him a clear track (however, this reasoning was later rejected by the stewards as most other cars on the track had also pitted). At the time, Hamilton was 'stacked up' behind, waiting for Alonso to leave. But when Alonso was released, he remained stationary for a further 10 seconds, even though the pit crew were gesturing for him to leave. Hamilton then pulled in for his final set of tyres, but the delay meant there was insufficient time for him to get back to the start-finish line before the chequered flag and the end of qualifying. Alonso started his flying lap with less than 2 seconds of the session remaining while Hamilton missed out by around 5 seconds.

Alonso's final lap was good enough to claim pole and push Hamilton down to second. TV pictures showed Ron Dennis angrily throwing his headphones down as Alonso pulled out of the pits; and after the session was over he was seen having a serious conversation with Alonso's trainer. He refused to comment on the pit-lane delay, although he later explained that Hamilton had ignored team orders to let Alonso past at the beginning of the fuel burn phase, which had put the cars out of sequence for their stops.

Behind the McLarens of Alonso and Hamilton, third went to Heidfeld, which surprised many Ferrari and BMW fans. In fourth was Räikkönen, fifth was Rosberg. Sixth place was taken by Ralf Schumacher of Germany, seventh was the second BMW Sauber of Robert Kubica. Giancarlo Fisichella posted the eighth fastest time, with Trulli and Webber rounding out the top ten.

Following the qualifying session, the stewards investigated an incident in Q1, when Fisichella appeared to block Yamamoto into the final corner – and they also investigated the Alonso/Hamilton incident (subsequently called Pitlanegate by the media). Fisichella was handed a five-place penalty, dropping him down to thirteenth. Alonso was also handed a five-place penalty on the grid, meaning he started the race in sixth position and promoted Hamilton to pole position. His McLaren team were told they would not be allowed to score any Constructors' World Championship points for this race, which McLaren subsequently appealed.

=== The race ===
Lewis Hamilton led every lap of the race (the first time anyone had done so in 2007), but had to withstand near constant pressure from the Ferrari of Kimi Räikkönen, which appeared more competitive than it did in qualifying and practice. Hamilton's team-mate Fernando Alonso managed to climb from his 6th place grid-slot to 4th by the end of the race, just behind the BMW Sauber of Nick Heidfeld. Alonso spent much of the race behind the Toyota of Ralf Schumacher, only getting past by the third stint. Schumacher finished in 6th place, after repassing Nico Rosberg (7th) and Heikki Kovalainen (8th) who were on three-stop strategies compared to Schumacher's two-stop strategy. This was the last time that Ralf Schumacher scored in Formula One.

Retirements from the race were Sakon Yamamoto, who crashed in the early laps of the race on his Spyker debut. Jenson Button and Vitantonio Liuzzi both suffered mechanical failure while the Super Aguri of Anthony Davidson was taken out after a collision with the Renault of Giancarlo Fisichella. The moment Lewis Hamilton crossed the finish line he was celebrated, becoming the first ever rookie and the only active Formula One driver to have achieved a Grand Chelem at the time. However 0.715 seconds later, Kimi Räikkönen beat Hamilton's fastest lap, depriving him of the record.

== Classification ==
=== Qualifying ===
| Pos. | No. | Driver | Constructor | Q1 | Q2 | Q3 | Grid |
|---|---|---|---|---|---|---|---|
| 1 | 1 | (Spain) Fernando Alonso | McLaren-Mercedes | 1:20.425 | 1:19.661 | 1:19.674 | 6^{1} |
| 2 | 2 | (United Kingdom) Lewis Hamilton | McLaren-Mercedes | 1:19.570 | 1:19.301 | 1:19.781 | 1 |
| 3 | 9 | (Germany) Nick Heidfeld | BMW Sauber | 1:20.751 | 1:20.322 | 1:20.259 | 2 |
| 4 | 6 | (Finland) Kimi Räikkönen | Ferrari | 1:20.435 | 1:20.107 | 1:20.410 | 3 |
| 5 | 16 | (Germany) Nico Rosberg | Williams-Toyota | 1:20.547 | 1:20.188 | 1:20.632 | 4 |
| 6 | 11 | (Germany) Ralf Schumacher | Toyota | 1:20.449 | 1:20.455 | 1:20.714 | 5 |
| 7 | 10 | (Poland) Robert Kubica | BMW Sauber | 1:20.366 | 1:20.703 | 1:20.876 | 7 |
| 8 | 3 | (Italy) Giancarlo Fisichella | Renault | 1:21.645 | 1:20.590 | 1:21.079 | 13^{2} |
| 9 | 12 | (Italy) Jarno Trulli | Toyota | 1:20.481 | 1:19.951 | 1:21.206 | 8 |
| 10 | 15 | (Australia) Mark Webber | Red Bull-Renault | 1:20.794 | 1:20.439 | 1:21.256 | 9 |
| 11 | 14 | (United Kingdom) David Coulthard | Red Bull-Renault | 1:21.291 | 1:20.718 | | 10 |
| 12 | 4 | (Finland) Heikki Kovalainen | Renault | 1:20.285 | 1:20.779 | | 11 |
| 13 | 17 | (Austria) Alexander Wurz | Williams-Toyota | 1:21.243 | 1:20.865 | | 12 |
| 14 | 5 | (Brazil) Felipe Massa | Ferrari | 1:20.408 | 1:21.021 | | 14 |
| 15 | 23 | (United Kingdom) Anthony Davidson | Super Aguri-Honda | 1:21.018 | 1:21.127 | | 15 |
| 16 | 18 | (Italy) Vitantonio Liuzzi | Toro Rosso-Ferrari | 1:21.730 | 1:21.993 | | 16 |
| 17 | 7 | (United Kingdom) Jenson Button | Honda | 1:21.737 | | | 17 |
| 18 | 8 | (Brazil) Rubens Barrichello | Honda | 1:21.877 | | | 18 |
| 19 | 22 | (Japan) Takuma Sato | Super Aguri-Honda | 1:22.143 | | | 19 |
| 20 | 19 | (Germany) Sebastian Vettel | Toro Rosso-Ferrari | 1:22.177 | | | 20 |
| 21 | 20 | (Germany) Adrian Sutil | Spyker-Ferrari | 1:22.737 | | | 21 |
| 22 | 21 | (Japan) Sakon Yamamoto | Spyker-Ferrari | 1:23.774 | | | 22 |

Notes

- ^1 – Fernando Alonso was dropped five places for impeding Lewis Hamilton during Q3.
- ^2 – Giancarlo Fisichella was dropped five places due to impeding Sakon Yamamoto during Q1.

=== Race ===
| Pos. | No. | Driver | Constructor | Laps | Time/Retired | Grid | Points |
|---|---|---|---|---|---|---|---|
| 1 | 2 | (United Kingdom) Lewis Hamilton | McLaren-Mercedes | 70 | 1:35:52.991 | 1 | 10 |
| 2 | 6 | (Finland) Kimi Räikkönen | Ferrari | 70 | +0.715 | 3 | 8 |
| 3 | 9 | (Germany) Nick Heidfeld | BMW Sauber | 70 | +43.129 | 2 | 6 |
| 4 | 1 | (Spain) Fernando Alonso | McLaren-Mercedes | 70 | +44.858 | 6 | 5 |
| 5 | 10 | (Poland) Robert Kubica | BMW Sauber | 70 | +47.616 | 7 | 4 |
| 6 | 11 | (Germany) Ralf Schumacher | Toyota | 70 | +50.669 | 5 | 3 |
| 7 | 16 | (Germany) Nico Rosberg | Williams-Toyota | 70 | +59.139 | 4 | 2 |
| 8 | 4 | (Finland) Heikki Kovalainen | Renault | 70 | +1:08.104 | 11 | 1 |
| 9 | 15 | (Australia) Mark Webber | Red Bull-Renault | 70 | +1:16.331 | 9 | |
| 10 | 12 | (Italy) Jarno Trulli | Toyota | 69 | +1 lap | 8 | |
| 11 | 14 | (United Kingdom) David Coulthard | Red Bull-Renault | 69 | +1 lap | 10 | |
| 12 | 3 | (Italy) Giancarlo Fisichella | Renault | 69 | +1 lap | 13 | |
| 13 | 5 | (Brazil) Felipe Massa | Ferrari | 69 | +1 lap | 14 | |
| 14 | 17 | (Austria) Alexander Wurz | Williams-Toyota | 69 | +1 lap | 12 | |
| 15 | 22 | (Japan) Takuma Sato | Super Aguri-Honda | 69 | +1 lap | 19 | |
| 16 | 19 | (Germany) Sebastian Vettel | Toro Rosso-Ferrari | 69 | +1 lap | 20 | |
| 17 | 20 | (Germany) Adrian Sutil | Spyker-Ferrari | 68 | +2 laps | 21 | |
| 18 | 8 | (Brazil) Rubens Barrichello | Honda | 68 | +2 laps | 18 | |
| Ret | 18 | (Italy) Vitantonio Liuzzi | Toro Rosso-Ferrari | 42 | Electrical | 16 | |
| Ret | 23 | (United Kingdom) Anthony Davidson | Super Aguri-Honda | 41 | Collision | 15 | |
| Ret | 7 | (United Kingdom) Jenson Button | Honda | 35 | Throttle | 17 | |
| Ret | 21 | (Japan) Sakon Yamamoto | Spyker-Ferrari | 4 | Accident | 22 | |

== Championship standings after the race ==
Drivers' Championship standings

| +/– | Pos. | Driver | Points |
|---|---|---|---|
| | 1 | (United Kingdom) Lewis Hamilton* | 80 |
| | 2 | (Spain) Fernando Alonso* | 73 |
| 1 | 3 | (Finland) Kimi Räikkönen* | 60 |
| 1 | 4 | (Brazil) Felipe Massa* | 59 |
| | 5 | (Germany) Nick Heidfeld* | 42 |

Constructors' Championship standings

| +/– | Pos. | Constructor | Points |
|---|---|---|---|
| | 1 | (United Kingdom) McLaren-Mercedes* | 138 |
| | 2 | (Italy) Ferrari* | 119 |
| | 3 | (Germany) BMW Sauber* | 71 |
| | 4 | (France) Renault* | 33 |
| | 5 | (United Kingdom) Williams-Toyota | 20 |

- Note: Only the top five positions are included for both sets of standings.
- Bold text and an asterisk indicates competitors who still had a theoretical chance of becoming World Champion.

== See also ==
- 2007 Hungaroring GP2 Series round

== Notes ==
| Previous race: 2007 European Grand Prix | FIA Formula One World Championship; 2007 season | Next race: 2007 Turkish Grand Prix |
| Previous race: 2006 Hungarian Grand Prix | Hungarian Grand Prix | Next race: 2008 Hungarian Grand Prix |
