= Turku archipelago =

Turku archipelago may refer to:

- Archipelago Sea, part of the Baltic Sea outside the Finnish city of Turku
- Islands of Turku, islands inside the city limits of Turku

== See also ==
- Åboland (Finnish: Turunmaa), the Swedish-speaking part of the Archipelago Sea, excluding Åland, i.e. Pargas and Kimitoön
