= Richard Wolverson =

British Formula One engineer

- Occupation: Engineer
- Employer: Red Bull Racing
- Known for: Formula One engineer
- Title: Head of Race Team Operations

Richard Wolverson is a British Formula One engineer. He is currently the Head of Race Team Operations for the Red Bull Racing Formula One team.

== Career ==
Wolverson began his motorsport career working in gearbox design. After completing his engineering studies, he joined Xtrac in 2001 as a design engineer, initially contributing to transmission programmes in the British Touring Car Championship and DTM. A brief period in 2004 as a track support engineer in North American racing was followed by increased responsibility for transmission design across a wide range of categories, including the World Rally Championship, LMP1 and LMP2 sports-car racing, NASCAR and Formula One applications. After seven years at Xtrac, Wolverson moved to Formula One full time in 2008, joining Red Bull Racing as a Transmission Design Engineer. In this role he was a key part of the gearbox design team on the Red Bull RB5 and continued working in the same area on the championship-winning Red Bull RB6 and Red Bull RB7. He later became Customer Transmission Engineer, acting as the principal technical liaison for Red Bull's customer programmes, including Caterham. With the introduction of hybrid systems, he also served as Customer KERS Support Engineer, overseeing the safe integration and operation of the technology.

In 2013 Wolverson was promoted to Engineering Coordinator, combining technical coordination responsibilities with the operational role of “Car Controller” during pit stops, ensuring that pit lane procedures were executed efficiently and safely. In 2015 he moved into the position of Engineer – Car Engineering, and in 2018 was further promoted to Senior Engineer, where he took responsibility for defining and managing car specification and overseeing build configuration throughout the season.

As part of a reorganisation of the race team ahead of the 2025 season, Wolverson was appointed Head of Race Team Operations, assuming responsibility for all trackside operations, including pit-stop performance, garage procedures and overall race weekend execution.
