= Red Bull RB5 =

2009 Formula One racing car

- Sebastian Vettel driving the RB5 at the Spanish Grand Prix
- Category: Formula One
- Constructor: Red Bull
- Designers: Adrian Newey (Chief Technical Officer); Geoff Willis (Technical Director); Rob Marshall (Chief Designer); Mark Ellis (Chief Engineer, Performance); Iain Bomphray (Chief Engineer, Composites); Andrew Green (Head of R&D); Peter Prodromou (Head of Aerodynamics); Dan Fallows (Chief Aerodynamicist)
- Predecessor: Red Bull RB4
- Successor: Red Bull RB6

Technical specifications
- Chassis: composite monocoque
- Suspension (front): Aluminium alloy uprights, upper and lower carbon wishbones and pushrods, torsion bar springs and anti roll bars, Multimatic dampers
- Suspension (rear): Same as front, except Pull Rod
- Engine: Renault RS27 (90°) 2400cc V8, naturally aspirated, mid-engine, longitudinally mounted, 18,000 RPM-Limited
- Transmission: 7 forward + 1 reverse
- Power: >750 hp @ 18,000 rpm
- Fuel: Total
- Tyres: Bridgestone Potenza; OZ Racing Front: 12.7in x 13in OZ Racing Rear: 13.4in x 13in

Competition history
- Notable entrants: Red Bull Racing
- Notable drivers: 14. (Australia) Mark Webber; 15. (Germany) Sebastian Vettel
- Debut: 2009 Australian Grand Prix
- First win: 2009 Chinese Grand Prix
- Last win: 2009 Abu Dhabi Grand Prix
- Last event: 2009 Abu Dhabi Grand Prix
Races	Wins	Podiums	Poles	F/Laps
17	6	16	5	6

The Red Bull RB5 is a Formula One racing car designed by the Red Bull Racing team for the 2009 Formula One season. It was driven by Sebastian Vettel, who drove for Red Bull's sister team Toro Rosso in the 2008 season, and Mark Webber. The car was launched on 9 February 2009 at the Circuito de Jerez in Spain.

The car gave the team its first pole position, first win and first ever 1–2 finish at the 2009 Chinese Grand Prix. Over the course of the season the car turned out to be competitive as it won 6 out of 17 races, with Vettel winning four races and Webber winning two. As a result, the team finished 2nd in the Constructors' Championship standings behind Brawn GP and Vettel finished second in the Drivers' Championship standings behind Jenson Button. In July 2010, Red Bull gifted designer Adrian Newey a complete RB5 car as a "thank you" gift for turning Red Bull into a title-challenging team. Newey first drove the car at the hill at the Goodwood Festival of Speed.

== Technical specifications ==
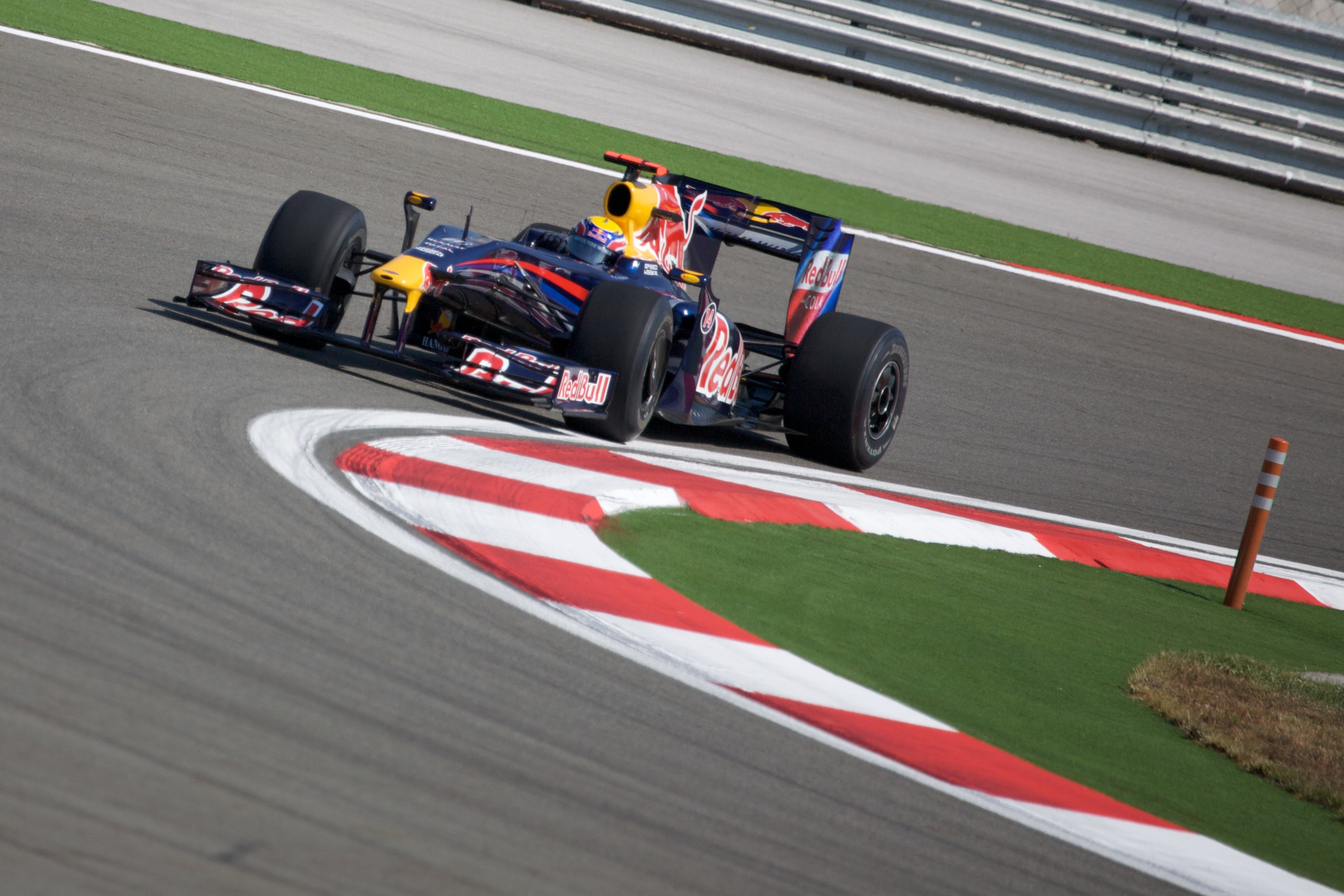
Webber driving the RB5 at the Turkish Grand Prix, where he took his third podium of the season.

New rules in place for the 2009 season required cars to have narrower and higher rear wings and wider and lower front wings, designed to reduce air disturbance to following cars and hence make overtaking easier. Slick tyres were re-introduced into Formula One, after being absent since 1998. This was expected to increase the RB5's tyre grip by about 20%.

There was a possibility that the RB5 could feature a Kinetic Energy Recovery System (KERS), which would allow energy which would otherwise be wasted while braking to be re-used in set amounts per lap, via a boost button on the driver's steering wheel. This was the result of new rules for the 2009 season. Red Bull originally attempted to develop their own system, but a factory fire resulting from overheated batteries stalled progress. In January 2009 Red Bull announced that they would use an identical KERS system to the Renault team, in an extension of the existing customer engine deal between the teams. However the RB5 never did race with KERS.

== 2009 season ==
=== Launch ===
The RB5 was launched later than most of its rivals, to allow a longer development time at the expense of a shorter testing time. Red Bull expected the RB5 to be more competitive than its predecessor, the RB4, which achieved a single podium in 2008. Vettel was optimistic when questioned about the car's potential:

"Obviously it's not correct sitting here and say I am going to win the world championship. I want to, but we need to see. We need to see how we are going, where we are in comparison to the others. I believe that the new rules could give a chance to teams like us to close the gap to the front but the favourites are Ferrari and McLaren, no doubt."

Sebastian Vettel, who (since joining Scuderia Toro Rosso) makes it a habit to name his racing cars, named his Red Bull RB5 'Kate' and after crashing it at Melbourne's Albert Park, he named his new chassis 'Kate's Dirty Sister'.

=== Testing ===
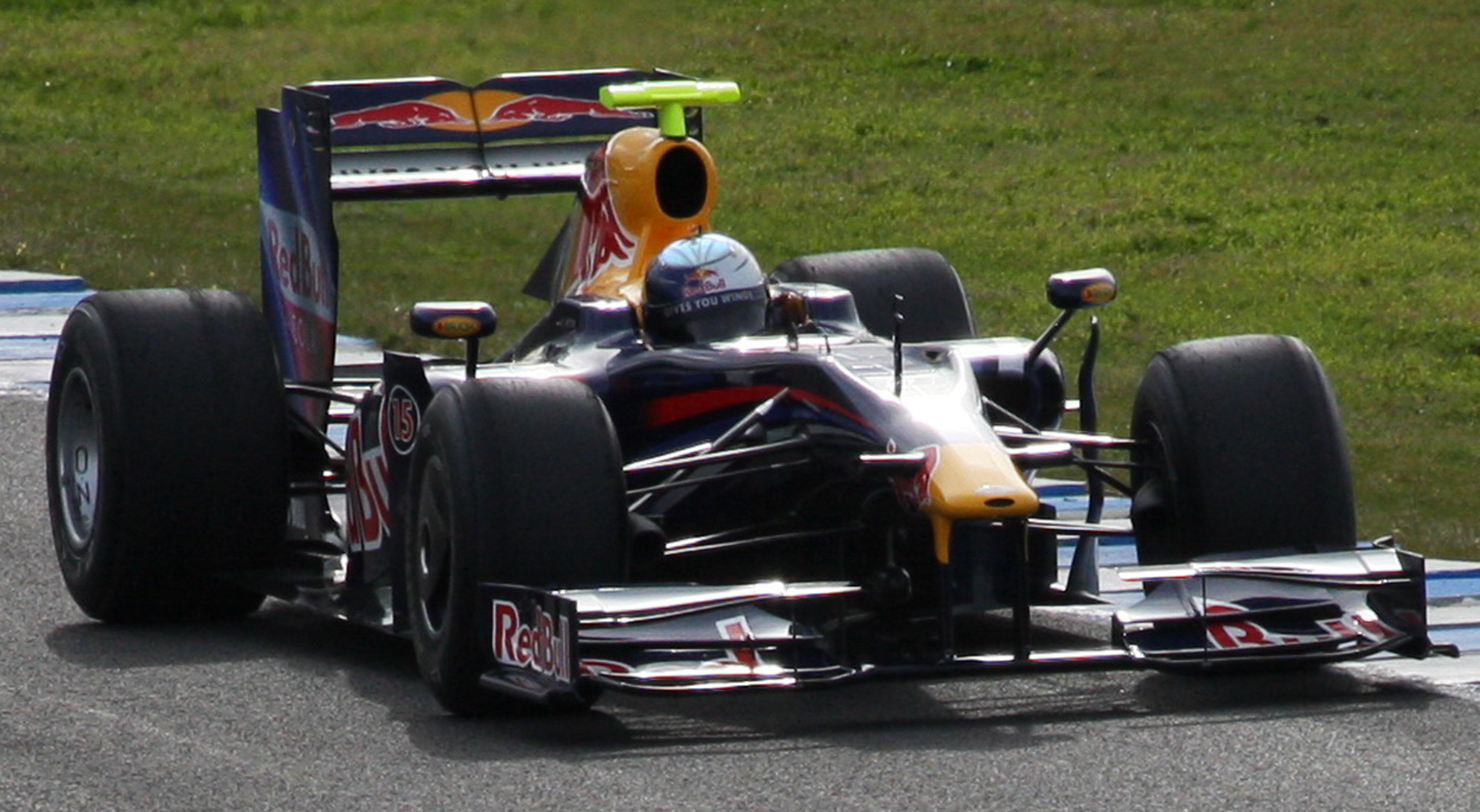
Vettel testing the RB5 in February 2009

Initial tests of the RB5 at Jerez were halted when high gearbox oil temperatures were detected. When the issue was resolved the RB5 was the quickest 2009 specification car at Jerez, where Vettel was faster than the equivalent Williams, McLaren and Renault cars. Webber returned to the cockpit after breaking his leg while cycling in November 2008; he completed 83 laps in the RB5, around the distance of a Grand Prix, and reported no problems whilst lapping faster than Vettel the previous day.

=== Season performance ===
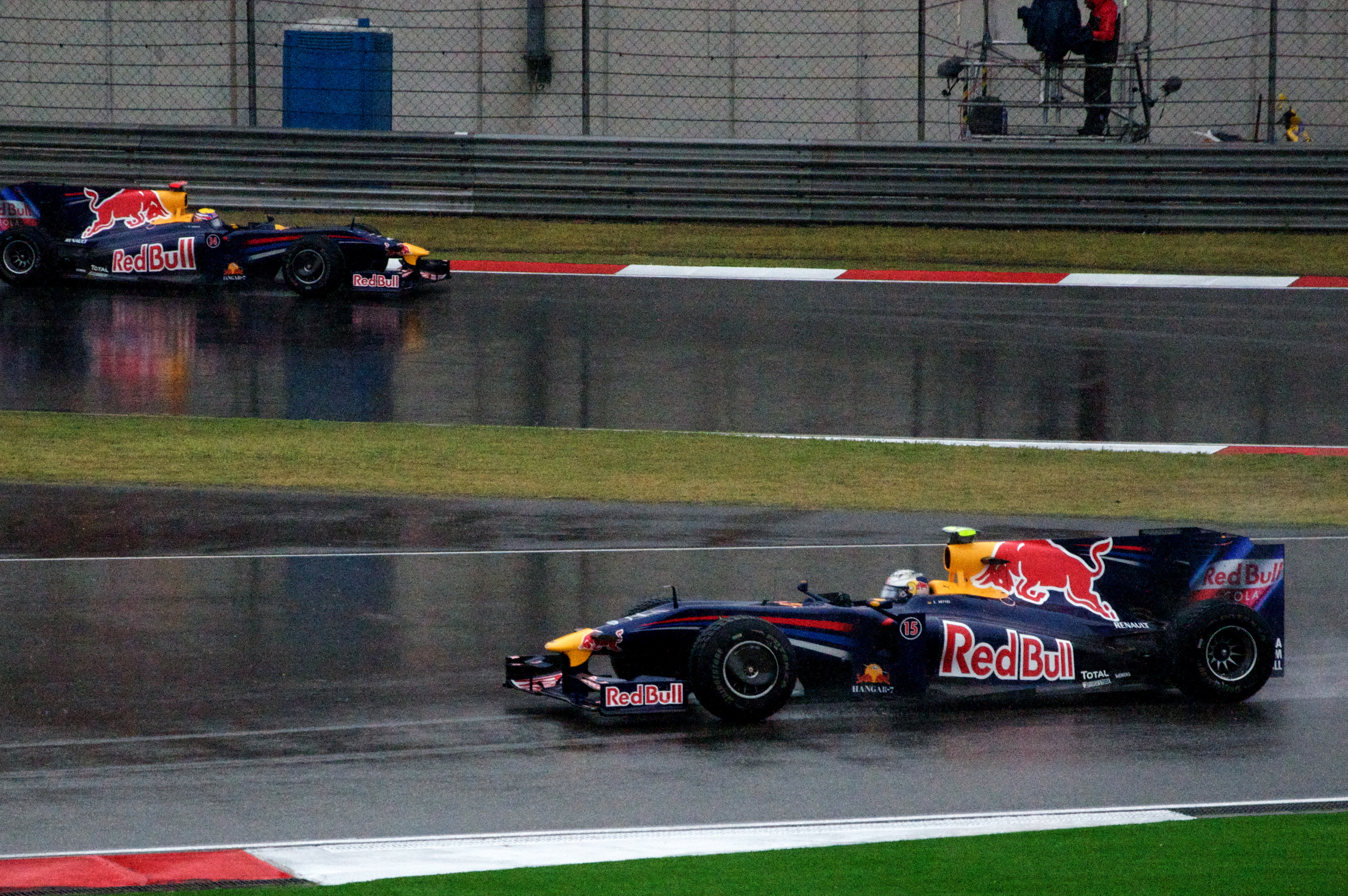
Vettel leads Webber in the Chinese Grand Prix, en route for Red Bull's first win in Formula One.

Early in the season the car showed huge performance with Vettel taking the first win for the team in China with Webber in second place giving the team their first 1-2 ever. As the season progressed the car continued to show its pace and by the mid-season its pace had increased to the point where it had overtaken the Brawn BGP 001 as the fastest car on the grid.

The car started the season with a narrow needle like nose (as was the common practice for that year.) However, for the British Grand Prix, the nose was replaced with a flatter wider nose. This design was used by Red Bull for the remainder of the V8 era.

== Sponsorship and livery ==
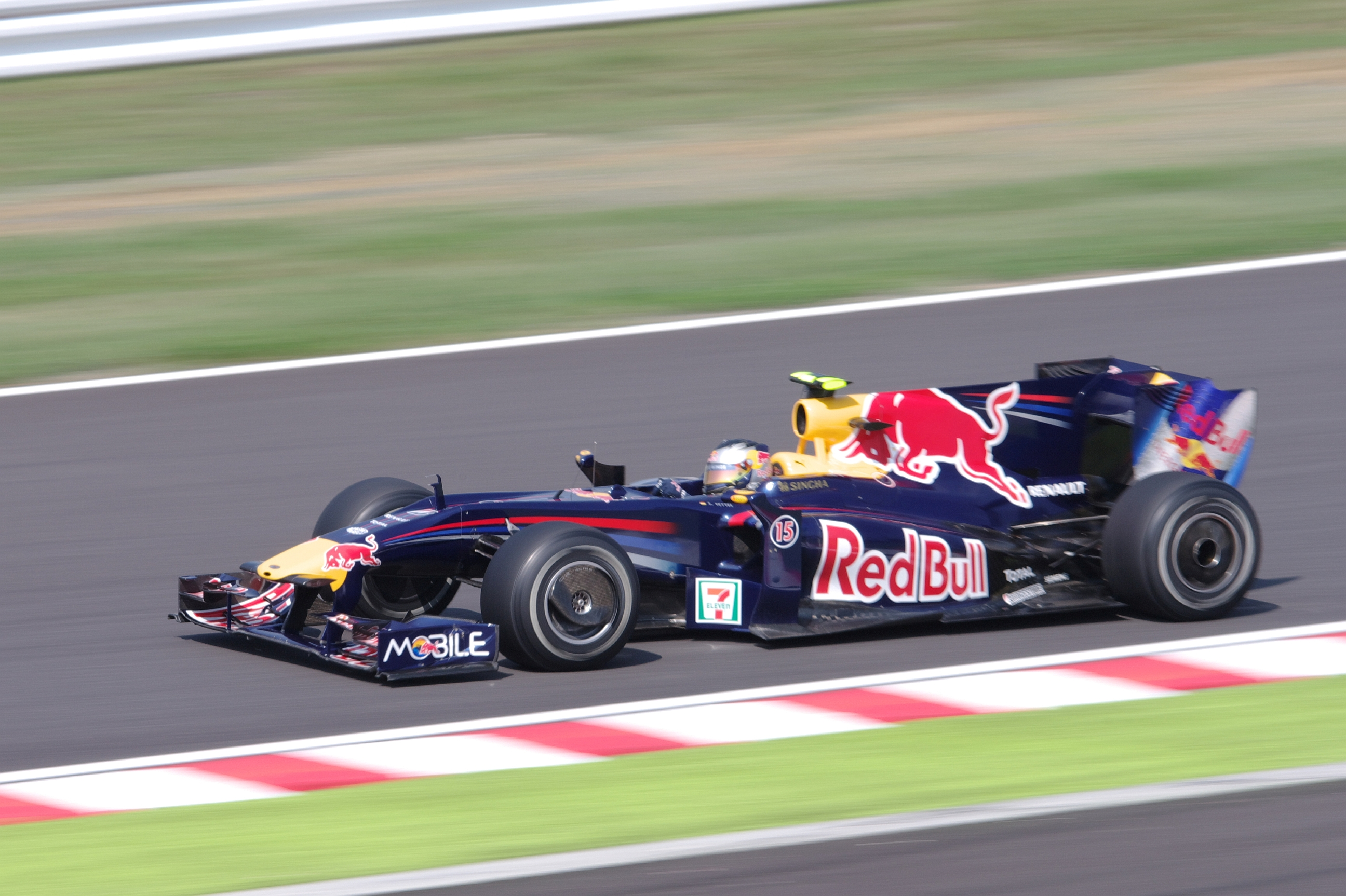
Vettel's RB5 sporting a 7-Eleven sponsorship during the Japanese Grand Prix.

At the Japanese Grand Prix, the sponsor 7-Eleven appeared on the endplate of the car's bargeboards.

== Chassis log ==
RB5	Four built (RB5/01–RB5/04) – three of them race winners
RB5 01 "Kate"	Shakedown tested by Vettel and Webber at Jerez in February 2009. Raced by Vettel to wins at Shanghai (also pole position), Suzuka (also pole position), and Yas Marina (also fastest lap). Also raced by Vettel at Albert Park, Sepang, Bahrain, Barcelona-Catalunya (Spanish GP), Monaco, and Istanbul (also pole position), and then later at Spa-Francorchamps (also fastest lap), Monza, Marina Bay, and Interlagos.
RB5 02	Raced by Webber to (his maiden) victory, at the Nürburgring (also pole position). Also raced by him previously at Albert Park, Sepang, Shanghai, Bahrain, Barcelona-Catalunya (Spanish GP), Monaco, Istanbul, and Silverstone, later at the Hungaroring (also fastest lap), and later still at Monza and Marina Bay. Used by him only in practice at Suzuka (crashed).
RB5 03	Only RB5 chassis not to win a GP. Used by Vettel only in practice at Albert Park. Raced by Webber at Valencia (European GP) and Spa-Francorchamps.
RB5 04 "Kate's Dirty Sister"	Raced by Vettel, to a win at Silverstone (also pole position and fastest lap), and later at the Nürburgring, the Hungaroring and Valencia (European GP). Later still, raced by Webber, to victory at Interlagos (also fastest lap), and previously at Suzuka (also fastest lap), and ultimately at Yas Marina.

== Complete Formula One results ==
(key) (results in bold indicate pole position; results in italics indicate fastest lap)

Year	Entrant	Engine	Tyres	Drivers	1	2	3	4	5	6	7	8	9	10	11	12	13	14	15	16	17	Points	WCC
2009	Red Bull Racing	Renault RS27 V8	**B**		AUS	MAL^{‡}	CHN	BHR	ESP	MON	TUR	GBR	GER	HUN	EUR	BEL	ITA	SIN	JPN	BRA	ABU	**153.5**	**2nd**
2009	Red Bull Racing	Renault RS27 V8	**B**	(Germany) Sebastian Vettel	13^{†}	15	**1**	2	4	Ret	**3**	**1**	2	Ret	Ret	3	8	4	**1**	4	1	**153.5**	**2nd**
2009	Red Bull Racing	Renault RS27 V8	**B**	(Australia) Mark Webber	12	6	2	11	3	5	2	2	**1**	3	9	9	Ret	Ret	17	1	2	**153.5**	**2nd**

^{†} Driver failed to finish, but was classified as they had completed >90% of the race distance.
^{‡} Half points awarded as less than 75% of race distance completed.
