= 2009 Formula One World Championship =

60th season of the FIA Formula One World Championship

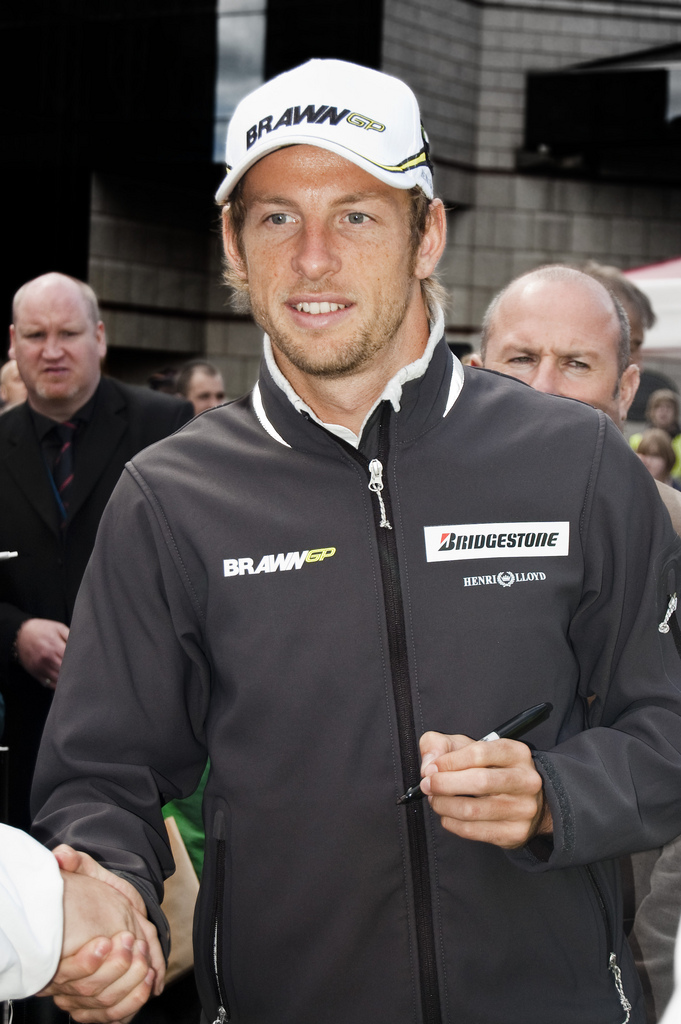
Jenson Button won his first and only World Championship driving for Brawn GP.

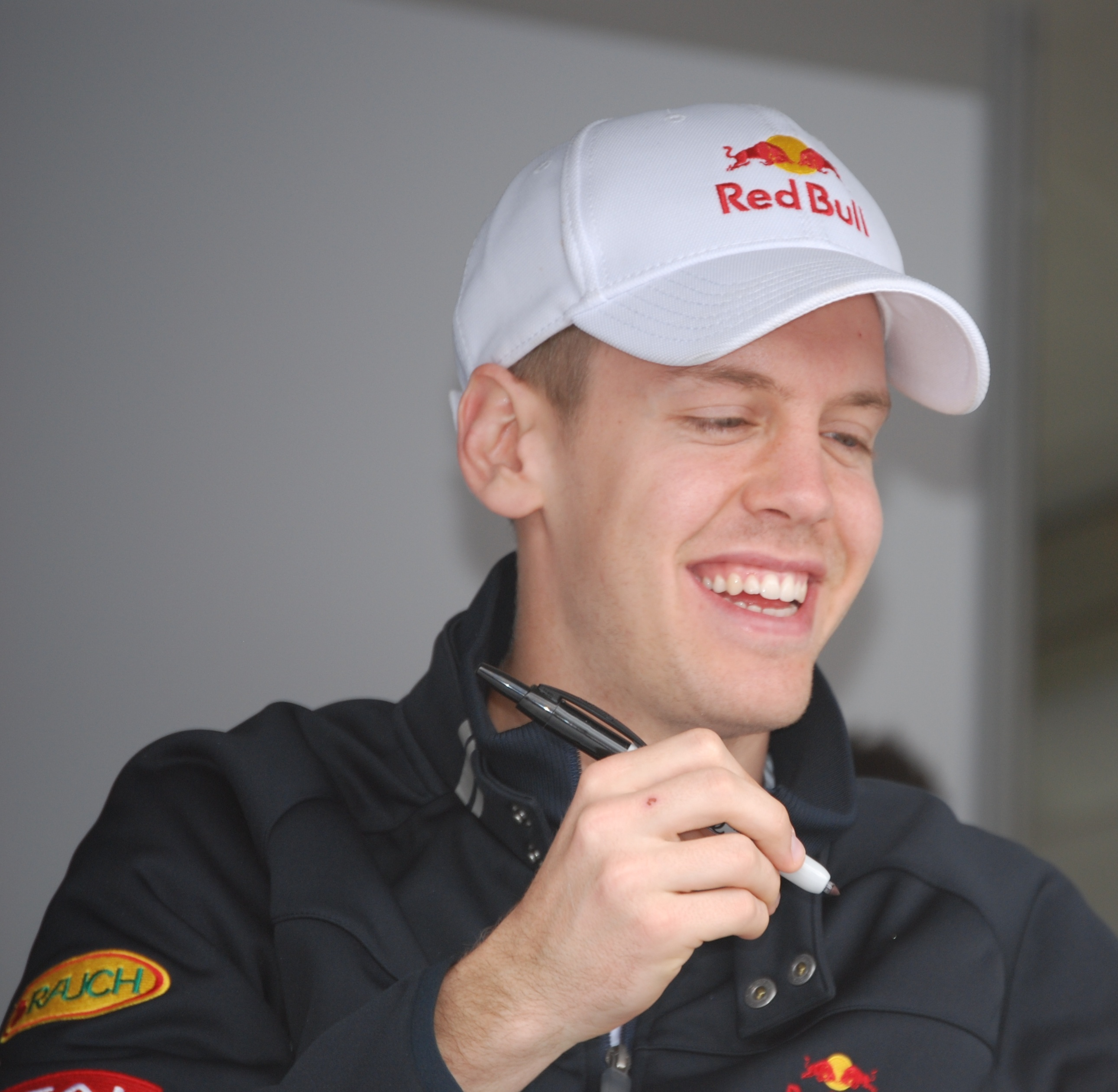
Sebastian Vettel finished runner-up behind Button by eleven points, in his first year with Red Bull.

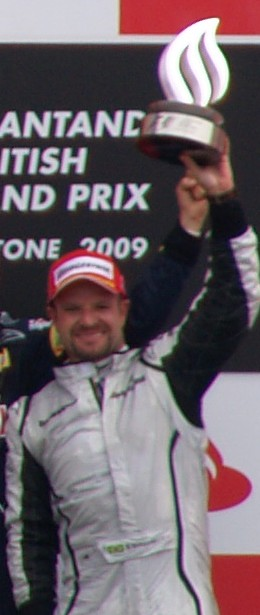
Button's teammate Rubens Barrichello finished third in the championship.

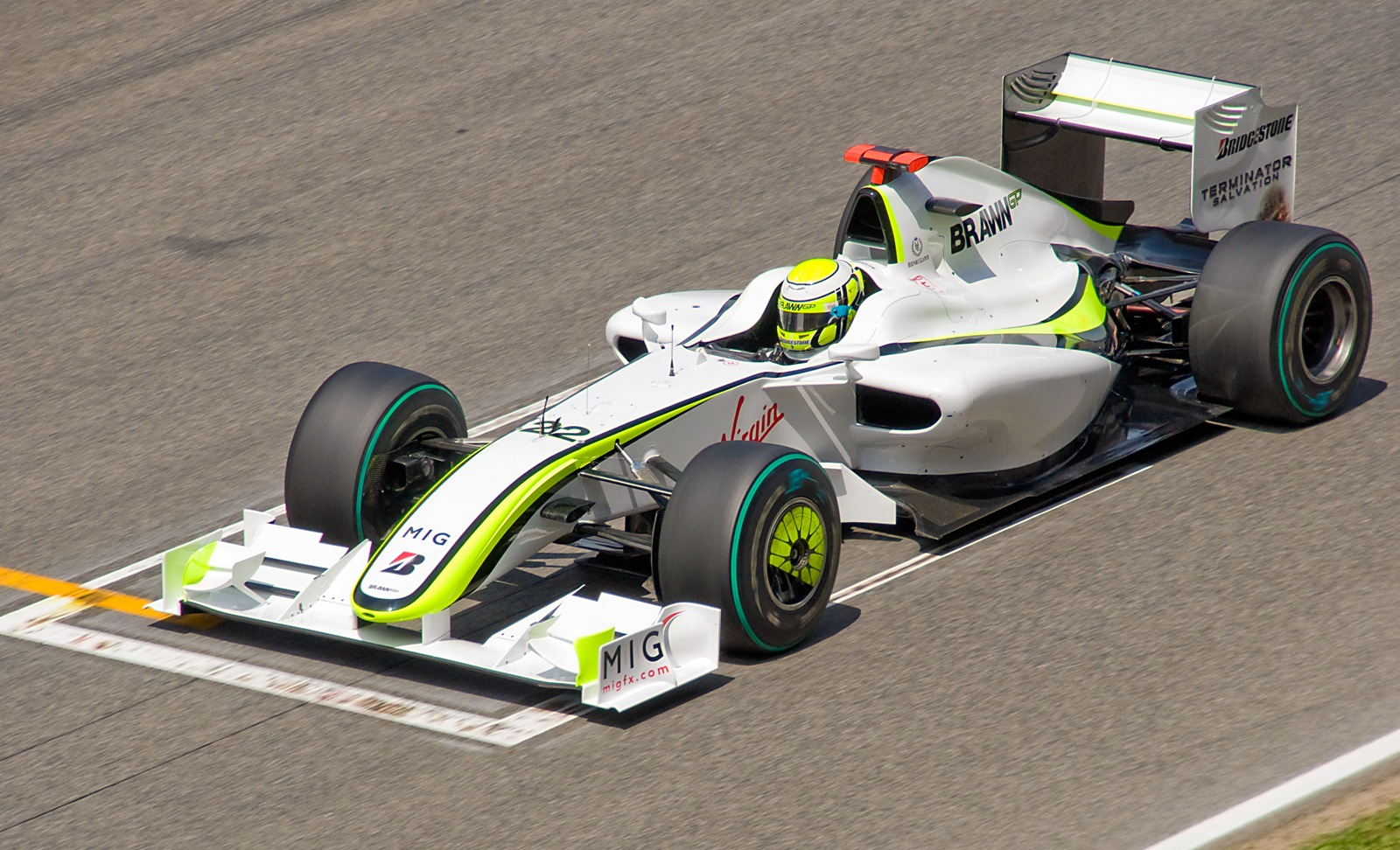
Brawn GP won their only World Constructors' Championship in their first and only season with the Brawn BGP 001 before being bought out by Mercedes the following season.

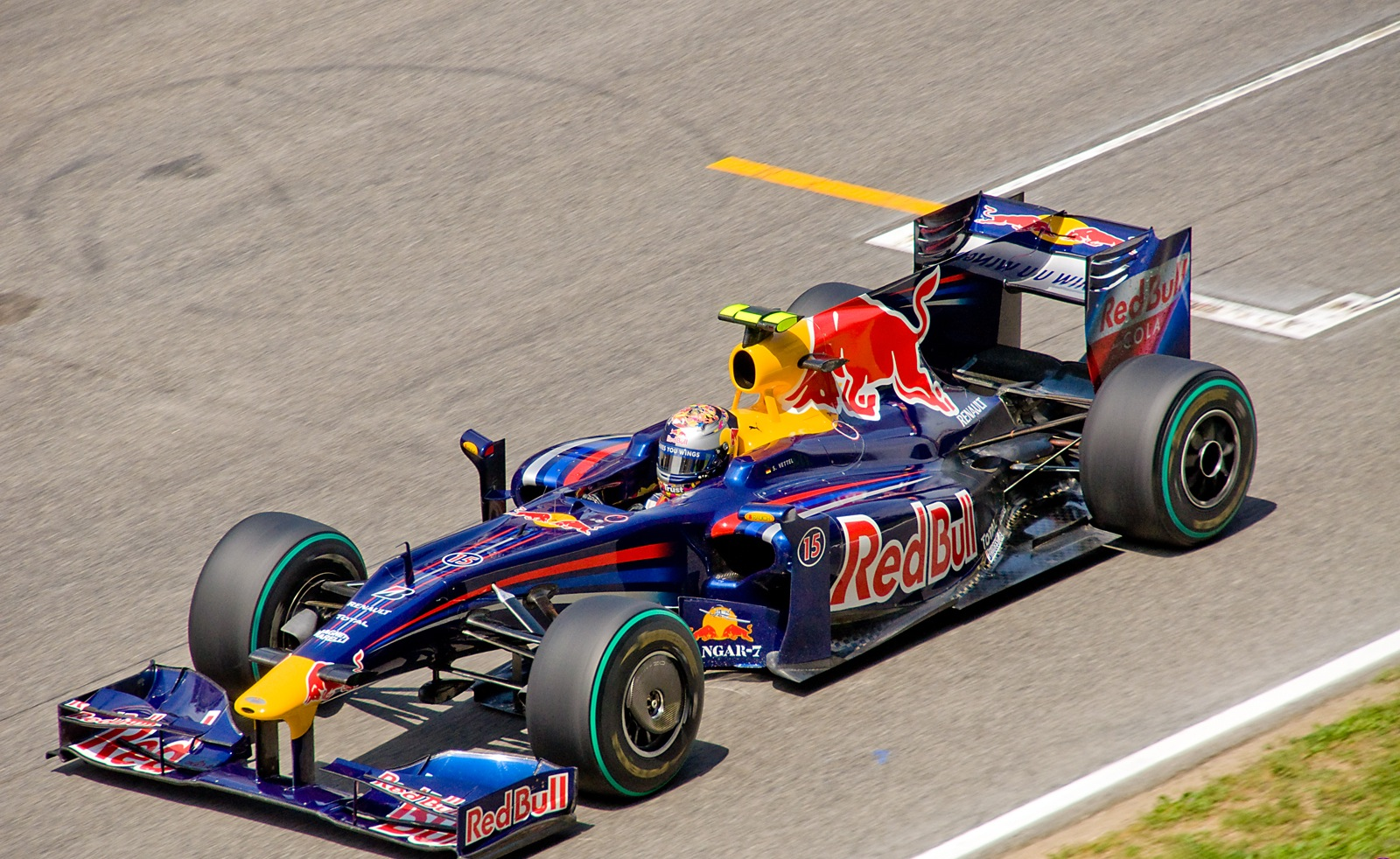
Red Bull Racing finished second in the World Constructors' Championship with the Red Bull RB5.

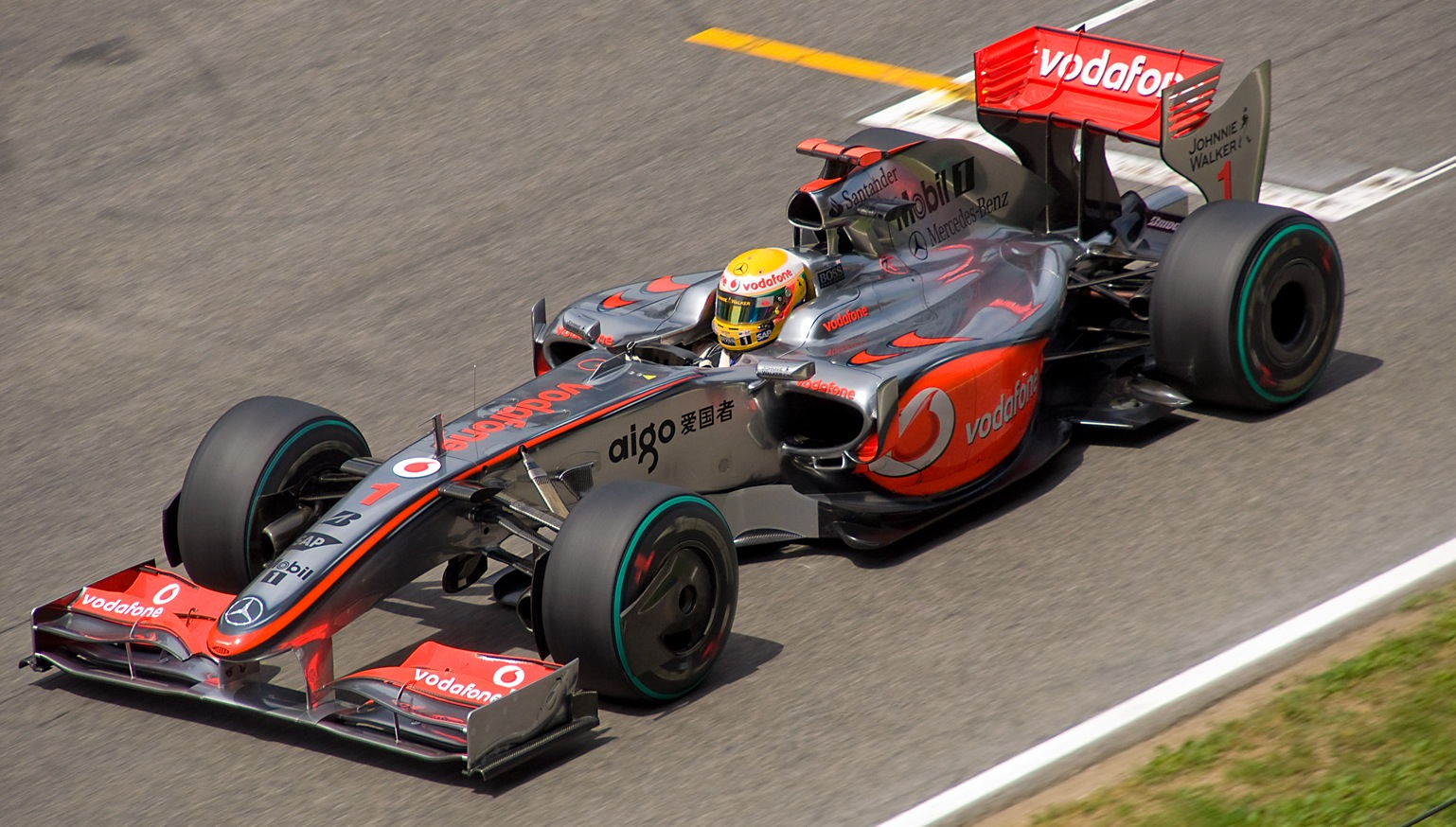
McLaren finished third in the World Constructors' Championship with the McLaren MP4-24.

The 2009 FIA Formula One World Championship was the 63rd season of FIA Formula One motor racing. It featured the 60th Formula One World Championship which was contested over 17 events commencing with the Australian Grand Prix on 29 March and ending with the inaugural Abu Dhabi Grand Prix on 1 November.

Jenson Button and Brawn GP secured the Drivers' Championship and Constructors' Championship titles, respectively, in the Brazilian Grand Prix, the penultimate race of the season. It was both Button and Brawn's first and only championship success, with Brawn becoming the first team to win the Constructors' Championship in their debut season. 2009 was the only season in which Brawn GP competed, before the team was sold to Mercedes for the 2010 season, also making them the only team ever to win 100% of championships in which they took part. Button was the tenth British driver to win the championship, and following Lewis Hamilton's success in 2008, it was the first time the championship had been won by English drivers in consecutive seasons, and the first time since Graham Hill (1968) and Jackie Stewart (1969) that consecutive championships had been won by British drivers. Also notable was the success of Red Bull Racing, as well as the poor performances of McLaren and Ferrari compared to the 2008 season.

Ten teams participated in the championship after several rule changes were implemented by the FIA to cut costs to try to minimise the financial difficulties. There were further changes to try to improve the on-track spectacle with the return of slick tyres (for the first time since 1997), changes to aerodynamics and the introduction of kinetic energy recovery systems (KERS) presenting some of the biggest changes in Formula One regulations for several decades.

The Brawn team, formed as a result of a management buyout of the Honda team, won six of the first seven races, their ability to make the most of the new regulations being a deciding factor in the championship. Red Bull Racing caught up in an unpredictable second half of the season, with the season being the first time since 2005 that all participating teams had scored World Championship points. Sebastian Vettel, Button's teammate Rubens Barrichello and Vettel's teammate Mark Webber were his main challengers over the season, winning eight races between them to finish in second, third and fourth, respectively.

It would be the last time a British-licensed constructor won the constructors' title until McLaren in 2024. The 2009 season was also the first season since 1997 in which the cars raced on fully slick dry weather tyres. This would also be the last season to use the scoring system valid since 2003 (10–8–6–5–4–3–2–1), and feature in-race refuelling during pit stops as the practice which had been allowed continuously since the 1994 season would be banned from 2010 onwards.

== Teams and drivers ==
The following teams and drivers competed in the 2009 FIA Formula One World Championship. Teams competed with tyres supplied by Bridgestone.

Entrant	Constructor	Chassis	Engine	No.	Race Drivers	Rounds
(United Kingdom) Vodafone McLaren Mercedes	McLaren-Mercedes	MP4-24	Mercedes FO 108W	1	(United Kingdom) Lewis Hamilton	All
(United Kingdom) Vodafone McLaren Mercedes	McLaren-Mercedes	MP4-24	Mercedes FO 108W	2	(Finland) Heikki Kovalainen	All
(Italy) Scuderia Ferrari Marlboro	Ferrari	F60	Ferrari 056 2009	3	(Brazil) Felipe Massa	1–10
(Italy) Scuderia Ferrari Marlboro	Ferrari	F60	Ferrari 056 2009	3	(Italy) Luca Badoer	11–12
(Italy) Scuderia Ferrari Marlboro	Ferrari	F60	Ferrari 056 2009	3	(Italy) Giancarlo Fisichella	13–17
(Italy) Scuderia Ferrari Marlboro	Ferrari	F60	Ferrari 056 2009	4	(Finland) Kimi Räikkönen	All
(Germany) BMW Sauber F1 Team	BMW-Sauber	F1.09	BMW P86/9	5	(Poland) Robert Kubica	All
(Germany) BMW Sauber F1 Team	BMW-Sauber	F1.09	BMW P86/9	6	(Germany) Nick Heidfeld	All
(France) Renault F1 Team (Note: Renault entered first thirteen Grands Prix as "ING Renault F1 Team".)	Renault	R29	Renault RS27	7	(Spain) Fernando Alonso	All
(France) Renault F1 Team	Renault	R29	Renault RS27	8	(Brazil) Nelson Piquet Jr.	1–10
(France) Renault F1 Team	Renault	R29	Renault RS27	8	(France) Romain Grosjean	11–17
(Japan) Panasonic Toyota Racing	Toyota	TF109	Toyota RVX-09	9	(Italy) Jarno Trulli	All
(Japan) Panasonic Toyota Racing	Toyota	TF109	Toyota RVX-09	10	(Germany) Timo Glock	1–15
(Japan) Panasonic Toyota Racing	Toyota	TF109	Toyota RVX-09	10	(Japan) Kamui Kobayashi	16–17
(Italy) Scuderia Toro Rosso	Toro Rosso-Ferrari	STR4	Ferrari 056 2008	11	(France) Sébastien Bourdais	1–9
(Italy) Scuderia Toro Rosso	Toro Rosso-Ferrari	STR4	Ferrari 056 2008	11	(Spain) Jaime Alguersuari	10–17
(Italy) Scuderia Toro Rosso	Toro Rosso-Ferrari	STR4	Ferrari 056 2008	12	(Switzerland) Sébastien Buemi	All
(Austria) Red Bull Racing	Red Bull-Renault	RB5	Renault RS27	14	(Australia) Mark Webber	All
(Austria) Red Bull Racing	Red Bull-Renault	RB5	Renault RS27	15	(Germany) Sebastian Vettel	All
(United Kingdom) AT&T Williams Racing	Williams-Toyota	FW31	Toyota RVX-09	16	(Germany) Nico Rosberg	All
(United Kingdom) AT&T Williams Racing	Williams-Toyota	FW31	Toyota RVX-09	17	(Japan) Kazuki Nakajima	All
Force India F1 Team	Force India-Mercedes	VJM02	Mercedes FO 108W	20	(Germany) Adrian Sutil	All
Force India F1 Team	Force India-Mercedes	VJM02	Mercedes FO 108W	21	(Italy) Giancarlo Fisichella	1–12
Force India F1 Team	Force India-Mercedes	VJM02	Mercedes FO 108W	21	(Italy) Vitantonio Liuzzi	13–17
(United Kingdom) Brawn GP Formula 1 Team	Brawn-Mercedes	BGP 001	Mercedes FO 108W	22	(United Kingdom) Jenson Button	All
(United Kingdom) Brawn GP Formula 1 Team	Brawn-Mercedes	BGP 001	Mercedes FO 108W	23	(Brazil) Rubens Barrichello	All

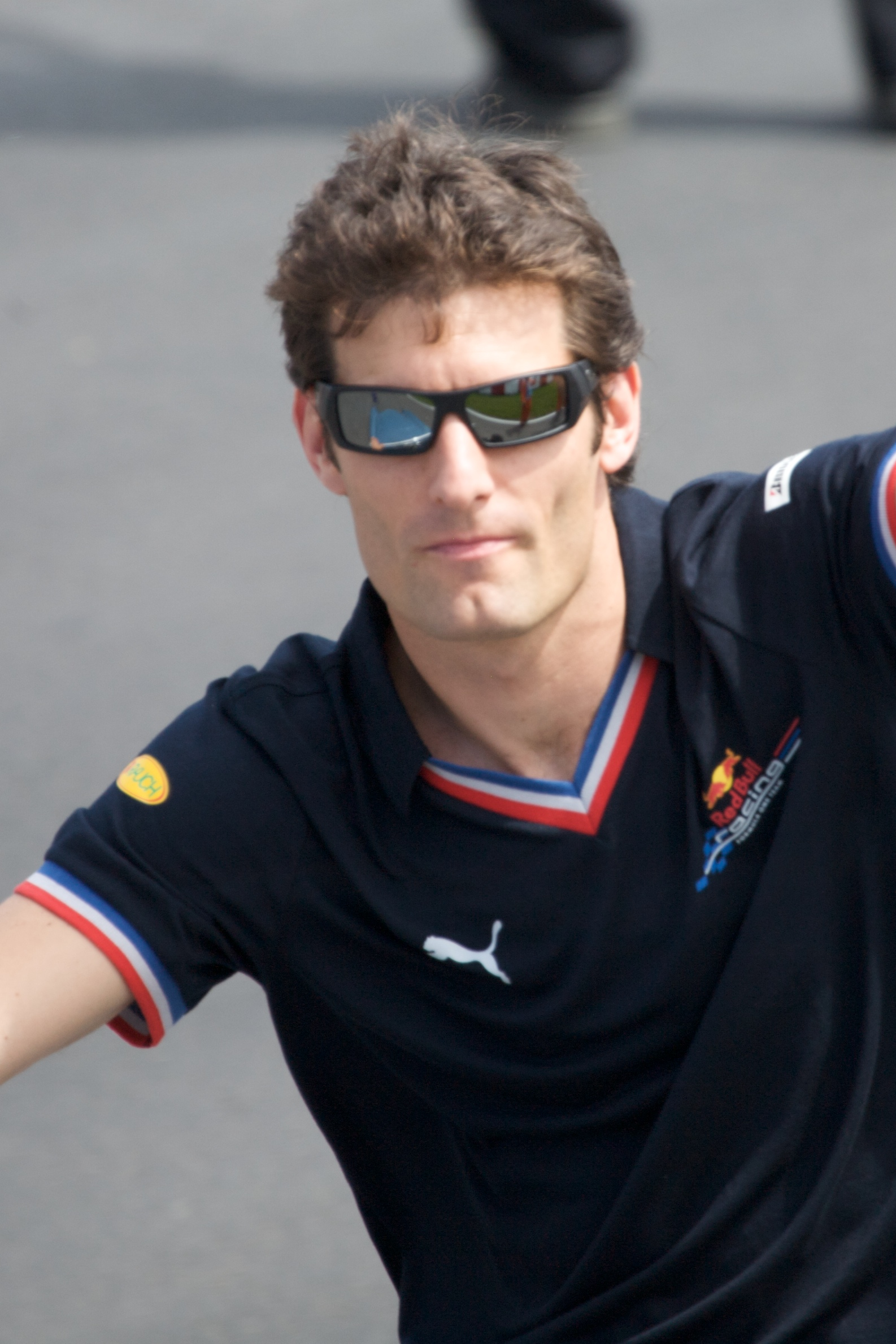
Vettel's teammate Mark Webber (pictured in 2008), finished 4th in the championship.

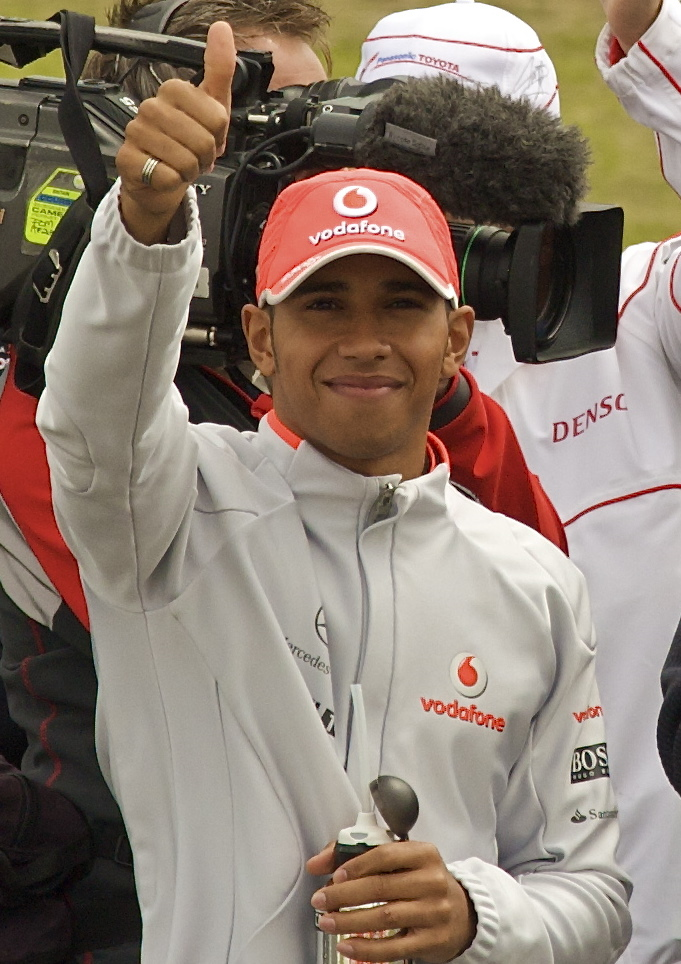
Lewis Hamilton, the defending World Champion, finished the season ranked 5th.

=== Free practice drivers ===
One constructor entered free practice only drivers over the course of the season: Kamui Kobayashi for Toyota at the Japanese Grand Prix.

=== Team changes ===
Honda withdrew ahead of the 2009 season, and the team was bought by a consortium led by team principal Ross Brawn. Brawn renamed the team Brawn GP, and raced with Mercedes engines, but retained Honda drivers Jenson Button and Rubens Barrichello and thus for the first time since 1982 season that Honda brand would absent in the sport until its return in 2015. Force India also raced with Mercedes engines, after running with Ferrari engines in 2008.

=== Driver changes ===
The only offseason driver change was following the retirement of Red Bull's David Coulthard after 14 years in Formula One. He was replaced by Sebastian Vettel, who had raced for Toro Rosso in 2008. Vettel's seat at Toro Rosso was taken by the Swiss driver Sébastien Buemi, who was Red Bull's test driver in 2008.

Following the German Grand Prix, Toro Rosso's Sébastien Bourdais was dropped by the team, with Toro Rosso principal Franz Tost claiming that the partnership had not met his expectations. Bourdais was replaced by Jaime Alguersuari ahead of the Hungarian Grand Prix. Alguersuari had been racing in Formula Renault 3.5 Series in 2009, and had only signed a deal to replace Brendon Hartley as Toro Rosso's test driver two weeks prior. Bourdais was advised by counsel to file suit for breach of contract by Toro Rosso. Toro Rosso settled the matter with a $2.1 million payment to Bourdais to avoid litigation.

After sustaining an injury during qualifying for the Hungarian Grand Prix, Ferrari's Felipe Massa missed the remainder of the season. He was replaced for the next two races by Ferrari test driver Luca Badoer, but after Badoer failed to score a single point in his two races, Ferrari replaced him with Giancarlo Fisichella who had signed a deal to be a Ferrari test driver for 2010 and had driven for Force India throughout the 2009 season. Fisichella's seat at Force India was taken by Vitantonio Liuzzi, who was Force India's test driver.

Following the Hungarian Grand Prix, Renault parted ways with Nelson Piquet Jr. as he had failed to score a single point and allegations that he had intentionally crashed during the 2008 Singapore Grand Prix surfaced. Piquet was replaced by Romain Grosjean, who was Renault's test driver.

The 2007 World Champion, Kimi Räikkönen announced he would be leaving Ferrari at the end of the season, while Ferrari announced Fernando Alonso as their team driver for the 2010 season. In qualifying for the Japanese Grand Prix, Toyota's Timo Glock crashed heavily at the last corner and was airlifted to hospital with a leg injury. As he was not fit to race, Jarno Trulli was the only driver representing Toyota at the Japanese Grand Prix. On 11 October, Toyota confirmed that its test driver Kamui Kobayashi would make his race debut in the Brazilian Grand Prix, as Glock had suffered further complications from his accident, resulting in a cracked vertebra and he would not be guaranteed to be fit in time to race in Brazil. Kobayashi retained the seat in the final race of the season in Abu Dhabi.

== Calendar ==
Round	Grand Prix	Circuit	Date
1	Australian Grand Prix	(Australia) Albert Park Circuit, Melbourne	29 March
2	Malaysian Grand Prix	(Malaysia) Sepang International Circuit, Selangor	5 April
3	Chinese Grand Prix	(China) Shanghai International Circuit, Shanghai	19 April
4	Bahrain Grand Prix	Bahrain International Circuit, Sakhir	26 April
5	Spanish Grand Prix	(Spain) Circuit de Catalunya, Montmeló	10 May
6	Monaco Grand Prix	Circuit de Monaco, Monte Carlo	24 May
7	Turkish Grand Prix	(Turkey) Istanbul Park, Istanbul	7 June
8	British Grand Prix	(United Kingdom) Silverstone Circuit, Silverstone	21 June
9	German Grand Prix	(Germany) Nürburgring, Nürburg	12 July
10	Hungarian Grand Prix	(Hungary) Hungaroring, Mogyoród	26 July
11	European Grand Prix	(Spain) Valencia Street Circuit, Valencia	23 August
12	Belgian Grand Prix	(Belgium) Circuit de Spa-Francorchamps, Stavelot	30 August
13	Italian Grand Prix	(Italy) Autodromo Nazionale di Monza, Monza	13 September
14	Singapore Grand Prix	Marina Bay Street Circuit, Singapore	27 September
15	Japanese Grand Prix	(Japan) Suzuka Circuit, Suzuka	4 October
16	Brazilian Grand Prix	(Brazil) Autódromo José Carlos Pace, São Paulo	18 October
17	Abu Dhabi Grand Prix	(United Arab Emirates) Yas Marina Circuit, Abu Dhabi	1 November

=== Calendar changes ===
- Abu Dhabi made its first appearance on the F1 calendar under the name Abu Dhabi Grand Prix, with a race being held at the Yas Marina Circuit on Yas Island in Abu Dhabi on 1 November – the final round of the 2009 season.
- The Japanese Grand Prix changed circuits from the Fuji Speedway in Oyama to the Suzuka Circuit in Suzuka.
- The Canadian Grand Prix was originally scheduled for 7 June, but was cancelled due to lack of sponsors and contractual problems and was replaced by the Turkish Grand Prix; the Grand Prix returned the next year.
- The French Grand Prix was originally scheduled for 28 June at Circuit de Nevers Magny-Cours, but was cancelled due to the withdrawal of financial support by the government; the Grand Prix returned in 2018 at Circuit Paul Ricard.

=== Testing venues and dates ===
Test	Event	Circuit	Dates
1	Pre Season Test	Bahrain International Circuit, Sakhir	16–19 February
2	Pre Season Test	(Spain) Circuit de Catalunya, Montmeló	9–12 March
3	Young Driver Test	(Spain) Circuito Permanente de Jerez, Jerez de la Frontera	1–3 December

== Regulation changes ==
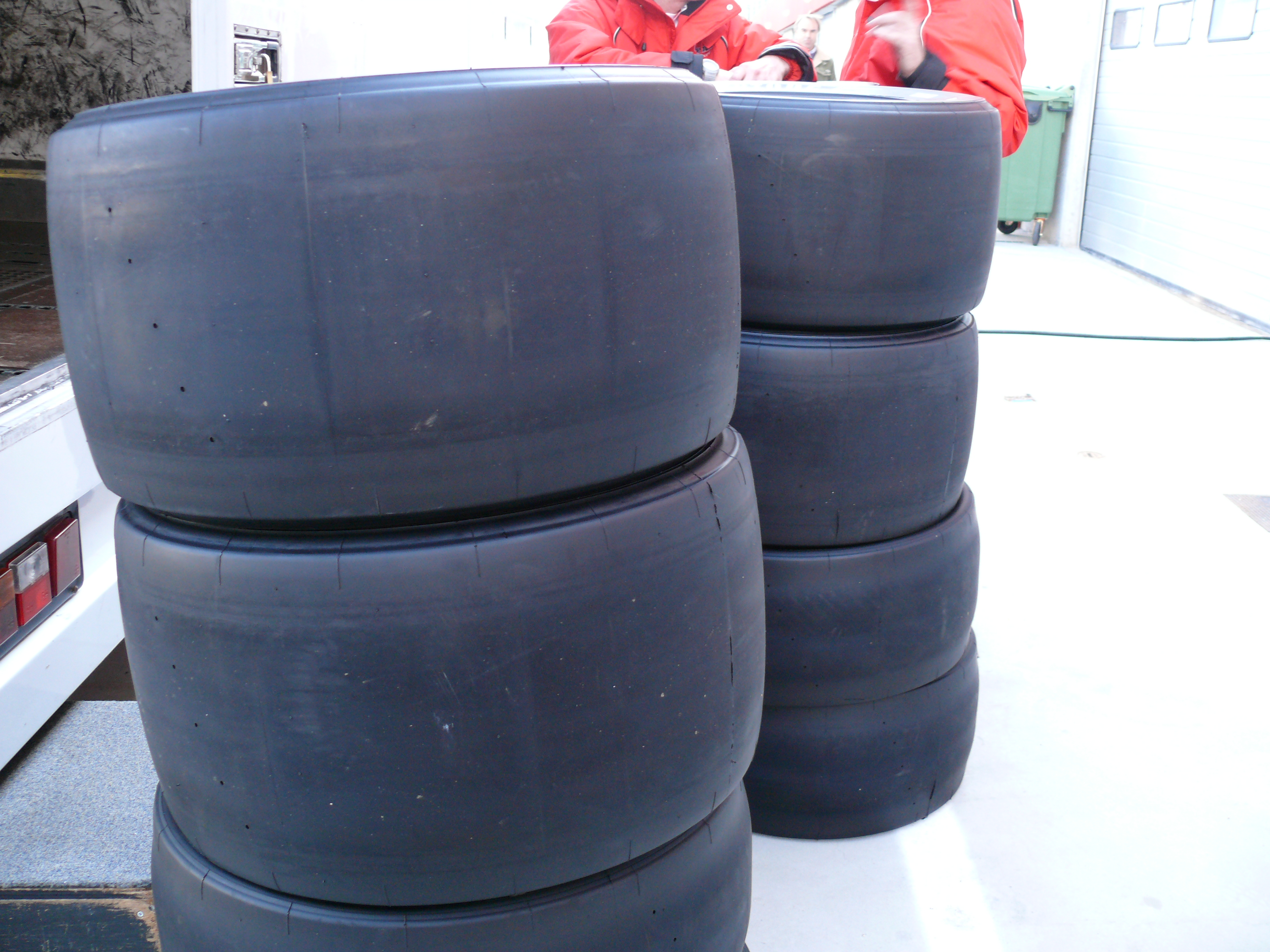
Banned since 1998, slick tyres were re-introduced for 2009.

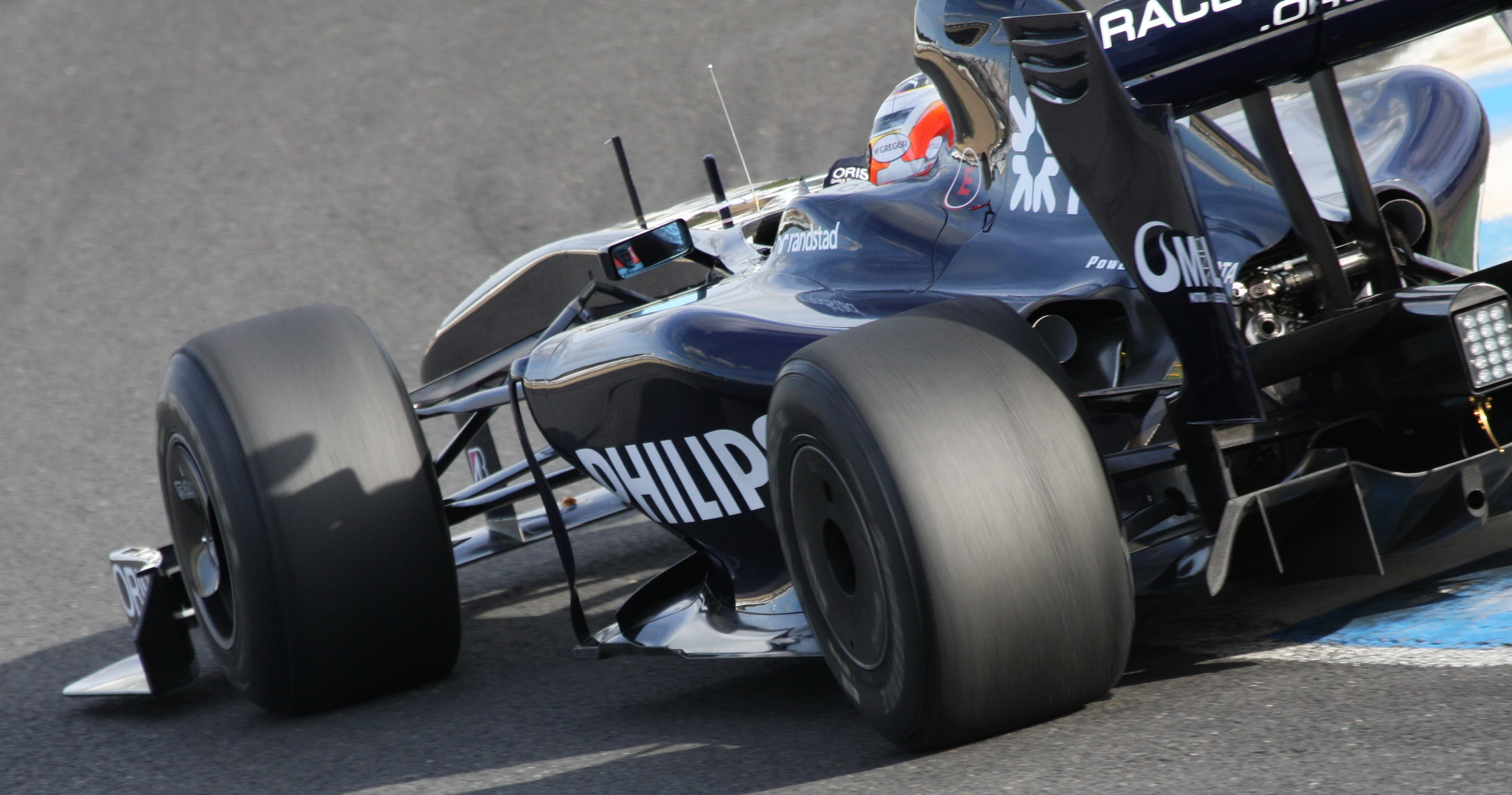
A ban on aerodynamic appendages resulted in the 2009 cars having smoother bodywork.

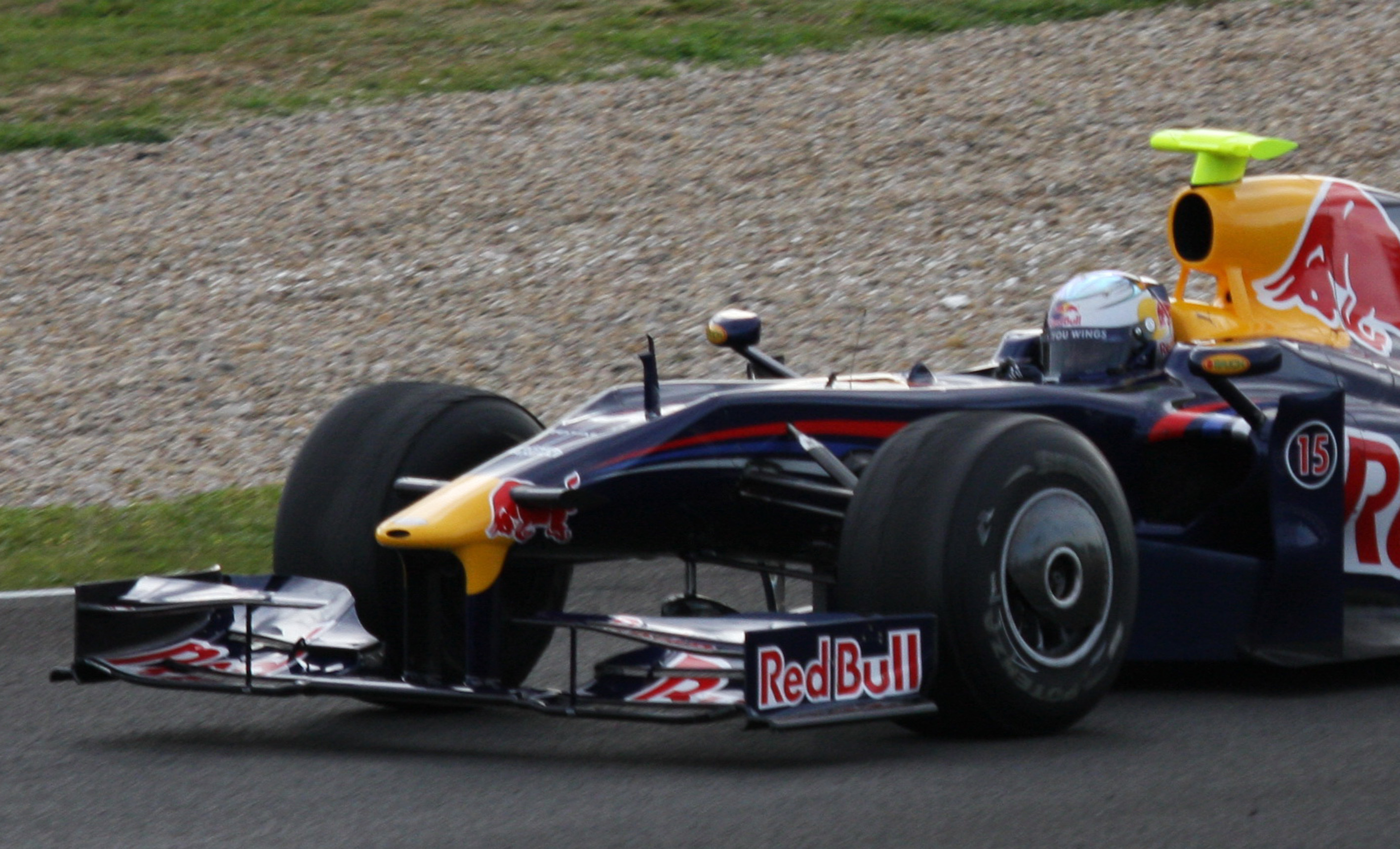
The front wing was lower and wider than in 2008.

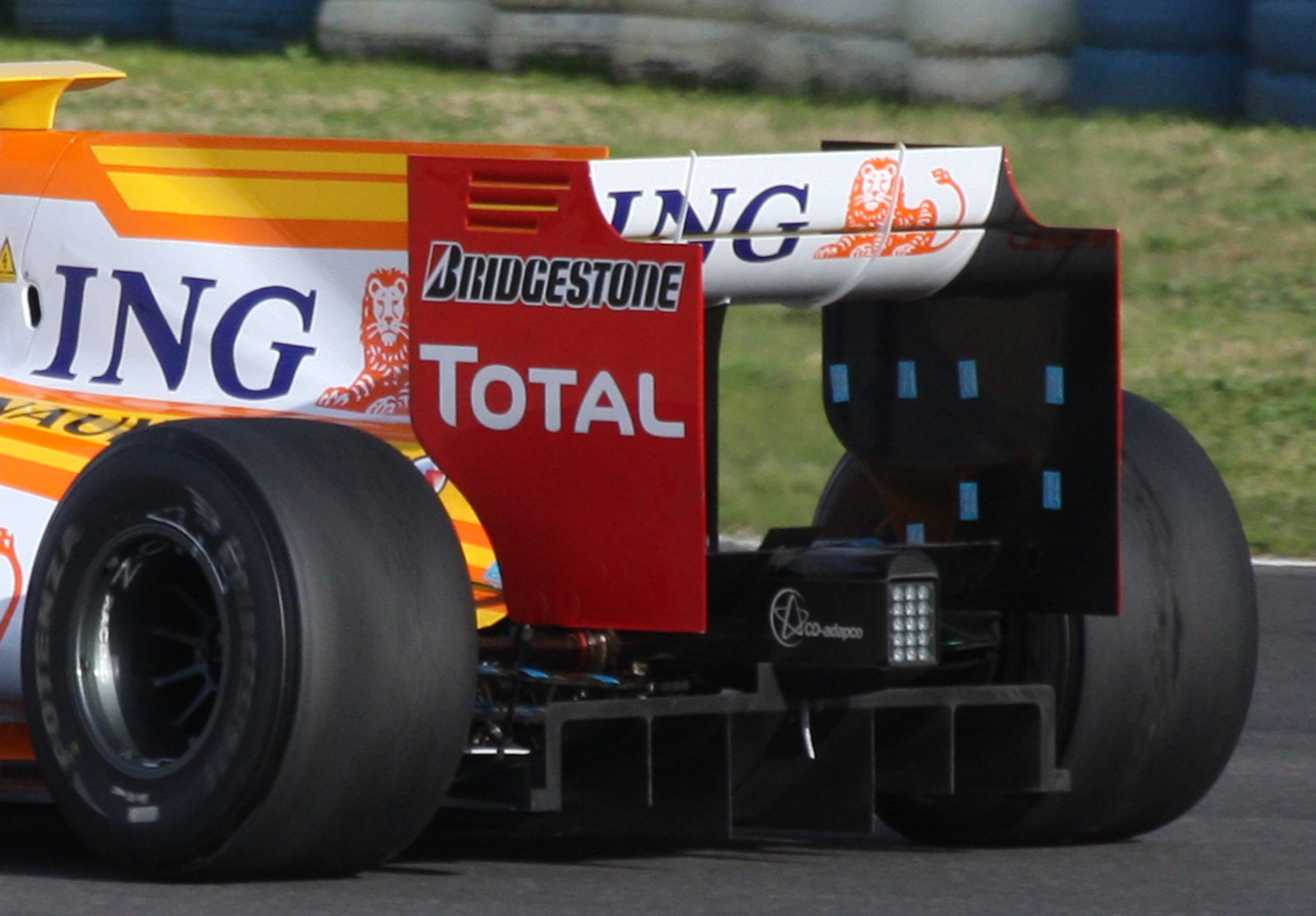
The rear wing was higher and narrower.

The FIA released preliminary technical regulations for the 2009 season on 22 December 2006, and these were revised several times to accommodate the findings of the Overtaking Working Group (formed in response to concerns that passing in wheel-to-wheel racing was becoming increasingly rare) and the increasing need for cost-cutting in the sport to minimise financial costs.

- Slick tyres returned for the first time since they were abolished for the 1998 season. Bridgestone continued to be the sole supplier of tyres, and drivers still had to use both compounds of tyre during a race. Soft tyres were differentiated by a green marking around the sides of the tyres, rather than a white marking in a groove as used in 2008. Further, wet tyres were renamed "intermediate" and extreme-weather tyres were renamed "wet".
- The aerodynamic regulations were radically altered for the 2009 season. The front wings were made lower and wider, while rear wings were changed to be higher and narrower. As well as the changes in the dimensions of the wings, bodywork became much more regulated with many of the additional components seen in previous seasons (including barge boards, winglets and turning vanes) removed, making 2009 cars noticeably different in appearance than in previous years. The diffuser at the rear of the car was moved back and upwards. Many other minor chassis components were also standardised. The aim of the new aerodynamic regulations, as well as the reintroduction of slick tyres, was to decrease reliance on aerodynamic downforce and increase mechanical grip with the aim of making wheel-to-wheel racing easier.
- For the first time, cars were allowed to use driver adjustable bodywork, in the form of adjustable flaps in the front wing. The flaps could be adjusted by up to six degrees, limited to only two adjustments per lap. Adjustable front wings were designed to improve downforce when following another car, another change designed to improve overtaking.
- Kinetic Energy Recovery Systems, a regenerative braking device designed to recover some of the vehicle's kinetic energy normally dissipated as heat during braking, were introduced for the 2009 season. The recovered energy can be stored electrically, in a battery or supercapacitor, or mechanically, in a flywheel, for use as a source of additional accelerative power at the driver's discretion by way of a boost button on the steering wheel. The regulations limit the additional power to around 82 hp (61 kW) of 400kJ for six seconds a lap. The systems were not made compulsory, and because of concerns about both limited performance gains and safety implications only four teams opted to use the system during the season.
- While the FIA were planning on introducing a budget cap to limit the amount of spending by Formula One teams in 2008, the amount was not agreed upon and the budget cap idea was dropped. Instead, costs were brought down by a complete ban on in-season testing, a forced reduction in wind tunnel usage, the sharing of more data during race weekends, an increased minimum engine lifespan and gearboxes had to last for four races, and a penalty of five places in the starting grid was applied, should a driver change it during the weekend before the start of the race.
- Each driver was limited to a maximum of eight engines throughout the season, in addition to four engines for practice/testing purposes; using additional engines resulted in a 10-place grid penalty for each additional engine used. To aid improvements in reliability, the engines were rev-limited from 19,000 rpm to 18,000 rpm.
- The rule stating that the pit lane is closed during a safety car period was scrapped in 2009. The rule was introduced in 2007 to prevent drivers rushing back to the pits to refuel, possibly speeding through a danger zone, but software was successfully developed to solve this problem. The pit lane speed limit was also increased from 50 mph (80 km/h) to 62 mph (100 km/h).
- The FIA initially declared that the driver with the most wins at the end of the season would be the winner of the 2009 Formula One World Championship, but dropped the decision because of opposition from teams and drivers. Formula One Teams Association argued that FIA could not change the rules this close to the season's start without the full agreement of the teams. Other proposals rejected by FIA were the introduction of a new points system with the scale 12–9–7–5–4–3–2–1 and to award medals for first, second and third place.

== Pre-season ==
FIA President Max Mosley announced dramatic rule changes for the 2009 season in a bid to improve the spectacle of the sport, with the cars undergoing major changes in an effort to increase overtaking. The design changes significantly altered the design of the cars, incorporating wider and lower front wings, taller and narrower rear wings, and a reduction on aerodynamic bodywork. Also introduced were slick tyres and Kinetic Energy Recovery Systems, as well as implementing cost-cutting measures in a response to the rising costs of competing.

Honda announced in December 2008 they would be leaving Formula One with immediate effect, as a result of the automotive industry crisis. After a winter of uncertainty, it was confirmed on 5 March 2009 that the team would compete in the 2009 season as Brawn GP, with Mercedes engines, following a management buyout led by team principal Ross Brawn, and would retain the services of both Jenson Button and Rubens Barrichello as drivers. Anthony Davidson, who competed for the Honda-backed Super Aguri team before their early withdrawal in 2008, joined Brawn as a test driver.

Force India joined Brawn GP in using the Mercedes engines by signing a five-year deal until 2013, having ended their previous supply contract from Ferrari. The retirement of Red Bull Racing driver David Coulthard led to the appointment of Sebastian Vettel as his replacement, who left the Scuderia Toro Rosso team after a successful previous season including winning the Italian Grand Prix. Toro Rosso, a team designed to develop new Formula One drivers, saw co-owner Gerhard Berger sell his half-stake back to Red Bull, claiming that the new regulations would "leave no room for improvement for a small team like STR", Franz Tost took over as team boss. Filling Vettel's race seat in Toro Rosso was Sébastien Buemi, who as part of the Red Bull Junior Team competed for Trust Team Arden in the GP2 Series.

The World Drivers' Championship would be decided in the traditional manner of points scored after Bernie Ecclestone's idea that the driver who won the most races be declared as the champion was scrapped following protests from the Formula One Teams Association. The teams were less successful in their attempts to have the long-running French and Canadian Grands Prix kept on the calendar, with the organisers of both events pulling out due to financial issues. The Abu Dhabi Grand Prix made its debut appearance as the last round of the season, at the Hermann Tilke-designed Yas Marina Circuit. The race, starting at sunset, was Formula One's first day-night race.

=== Testing ===
The first multi-team testing session took place at Circuit de Catalunya, Barcelona in November 2008, two weeks after the end of previous season. All teams, except Toyota, took part in the testing session where some teams tested their new aerodynamics package and slick tyres. The new look cars did not suit everyone's taste, with BMW Sauber's test driver, Christian Klien, labelling the car the ugliest car he'd ever seen.

The first 2009 test was held by Bahrain International Circuit, Bahrain on 16–19 February, and the second and final testing was held by Circuit de Barcelona-Catalunya, Spain on 9–12 March. The final test featured for the first time Brawn GP, who made an immediate impact by leading the times early in the day. The test was the first in which all teams used their 2009 cars and had BMW Sauber leading the times whilst Brawn GP were fourth. On day three, Brawn GP's Jenson Button was fastest by just over one second to Ferrari's Felipe Massa, while Button's teammate Rubens Barrichello went even faster the next day. At the other end of the timing sheets, reigning champion Lewis Hamilton's McLaren team were struggling to adapt to the new regulations, often 1.5 seconds off the pace. Massa stated he had never seen McLaren so far behind.

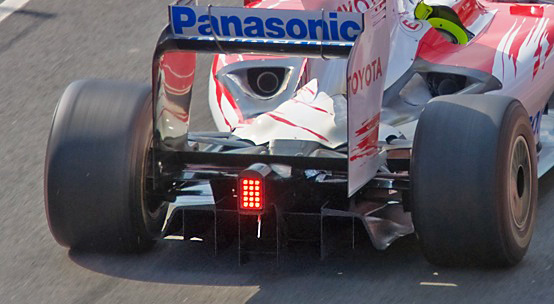
The controversial diffuser of the TF109 at Circuit de Catalunya

A major source of controversy throughout the winter season were the rear diffusers. Three teams – Toyota, Williams and Brawn GP – launched their cars with a diffuser that uses the rear crash structure in order to generate additional downforce, labelled "double diffusers". These designs were quickly protested, and just days after the cars were unveiled, rival teams asked the FIA for a clarification on the matter.

On the Wednesday of the season opening race in Australia, an official complaint was launched by the seven other teams against the rear diffusers of the Williams FW31, Toyota TF109 and the Brawn BGP 001 saying that they were illegal. The FIA scrutineers disagreed, declaring the cars legal. The other six teams filed an unsuccessful appeal which was heard on 14 April 2009 – the week prior to round three of the championship, the Chinese Grand Prix.

== Report ==
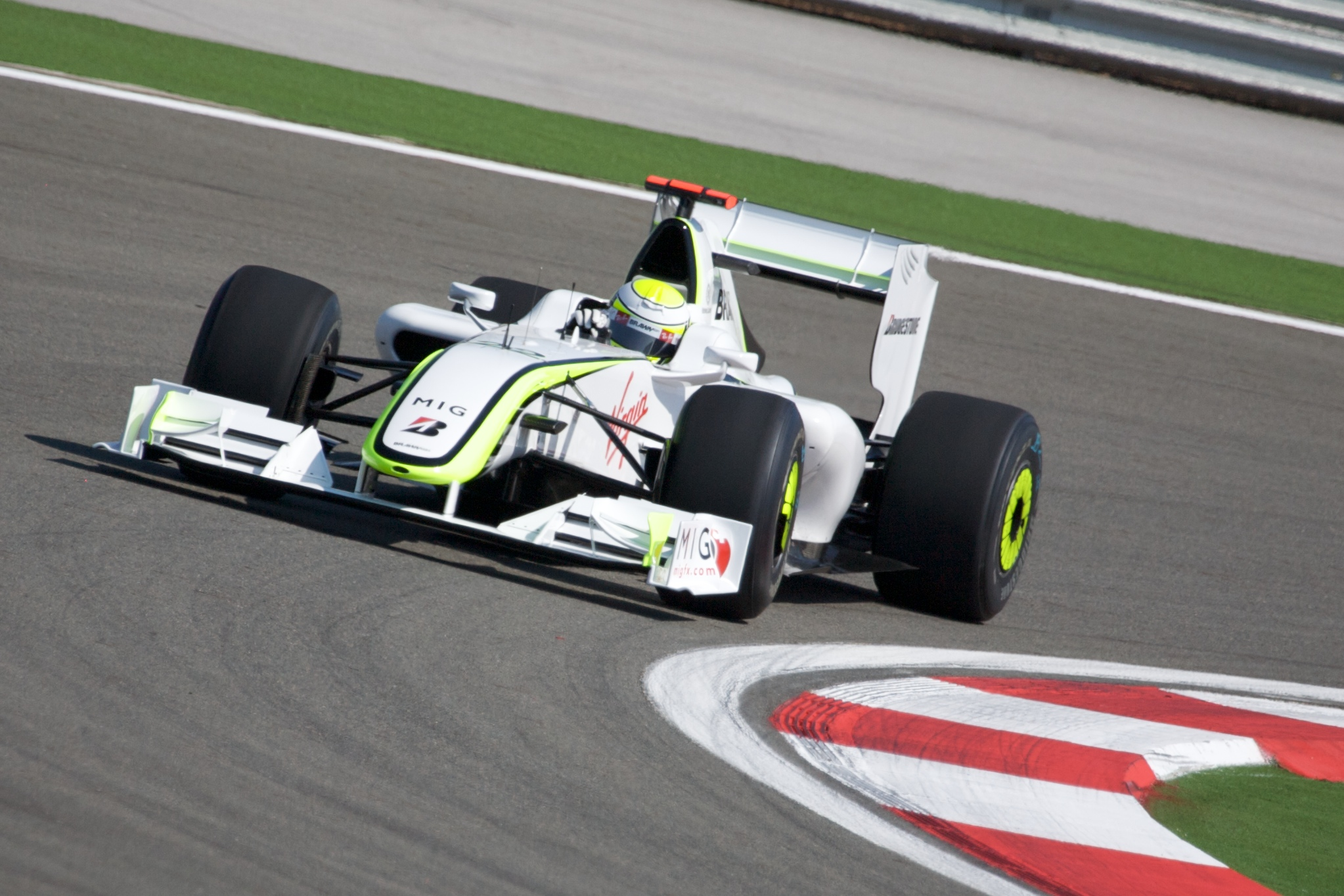
Button won in Australia giving the newly formed Brawn GP their first win on their debut; he subsequently won five of the six following races; and then he didn't win any of the remaining ten races of the season.

The season opened at the Australian Grand Prix, won by Jenson Button with teammate Rubens Barrichello in second, giving the team a 1–2 on its debut (Brawn GP becoming the first team to do so since Mercedes in the 1954 French Grand Prix). Red Bull's Sebastian Vettel had been running in second until he collided with BMW Sauber's Robert Kubica. The accident meant the race finished behind the safety car, with Toyota's Jarno Trulli eventually classified third despite McLaren's false protest he had illegally overtaken Lewis Hamilton. Reigning champion Hamilton was disqualified from the Australian race for lying to the stewards and at the following Malaysian Grand Prix there were reports he was on the verge of quitting. The race was equally dramatic, being stopped because of monsoon-like conditions, meaning only half points were awarded for only the fifth time in F1 history. Button mastered the changing conditions for his second win, while quick starting Nico Rosberg dropped to eighth when the race was stopped. In the interval between races, the controversial double diffusers, used by Brawn, Williams and Toyota, were declared legal by the FIA, ending the fight over their use. The Chinese race also took place in wet conditions, with the rain throughout the duration of the race necessitating a safety car start and causing several accidents. Vettel led teammate Mark Webber to Red Bull's first win in Formula One, ahead of the two Brawns and McLarens.

Dry conditions at Bahrain saw the Toyota team gain the front of the grid, but Button managed to fight up from a fourth-place start, and overtook race leader Timo Glock on his first pit stop. Hamilton and Räikkönen, in fourth and sixth respectively, gave their 2008 championship winning teams the best finishes of a disappointing season start. The Spanish Grand Prix was a battle between the Brawn teammates, with Barrichello getting ahead of polesitter Button while a first lap incident forced the retirement of four drivers. Button followed a different pit-stop strategy and passed Barrichello during his stop, leading Brawn's second one-two of the season. Red Bull was the closest team to Brawn finishing third and fourth, while Felipe Massa's fuel shortage lost him places as he slowed to finish the race. Button won in dominant fashion at Monaco, leading the majority of the race from pole position ahead of his teammate Barrichello and Räikkönen, who scored Ferrari's first podium in 2009. At the Turkish Grand Prix Vettel started on pole but lost the position to Button on the first lap. Button went on to win, followed by Webber and a closely pursuing Vettel. Barrichello's car developed a gearbox problem, and incidents with Heikki Kovalainen and Adrian Sutil resulted in Brawn's first retirement of the season. By winning six out of the first seven races, Button had opened up a 26-point lead on his teammate, with Vettel a further six points behind.

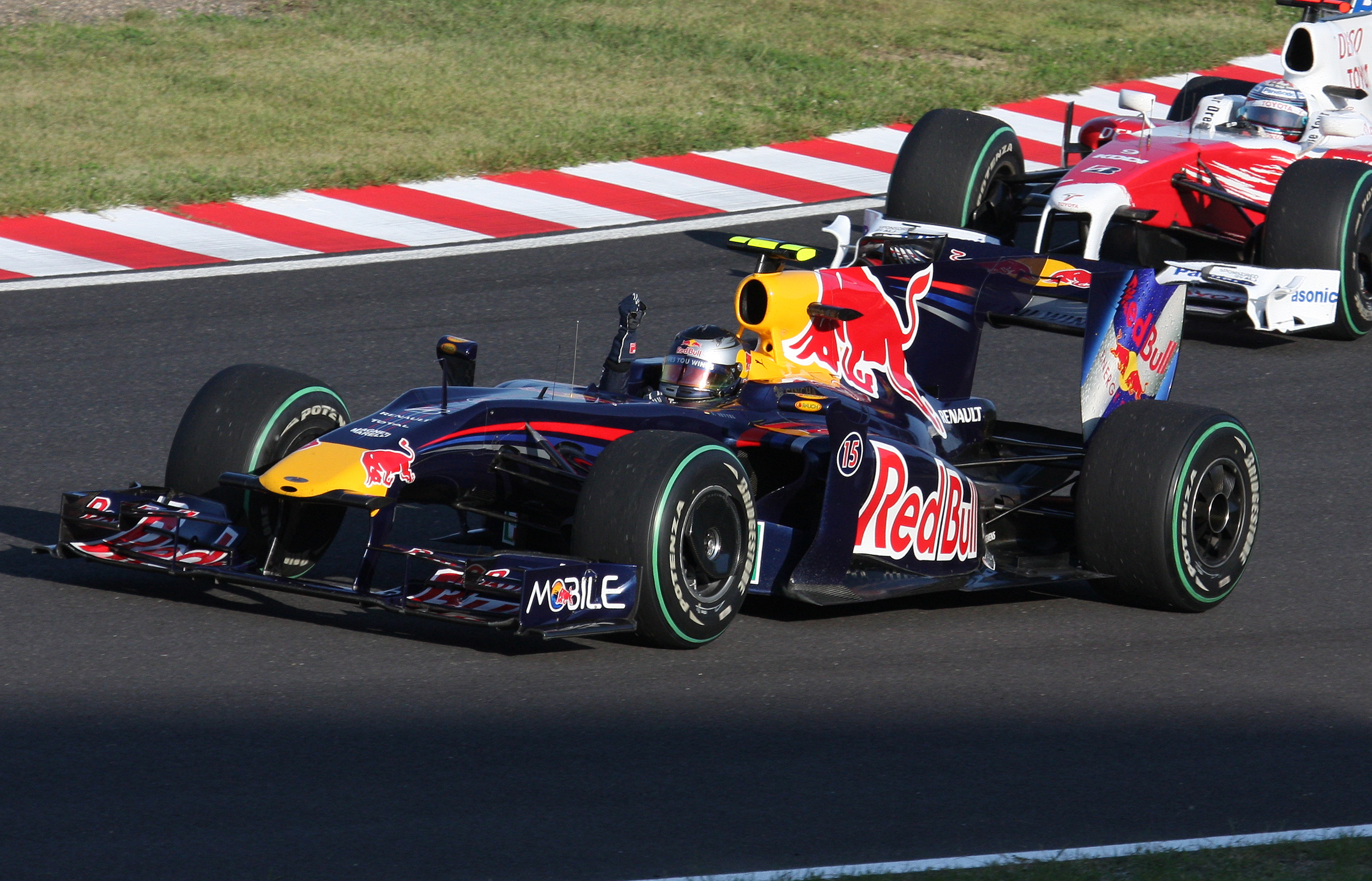
Red Bull and their drivers reduced the respective championship leads of Jenson Button and Brawn GP during the mid part of the season.

The British Grand Prix was seen as a turning point, being dominated by Red Bull with Vettel leading home Webber, in dry conditions. Button was not on the podium for the first time this season, finishing sixth. Red Bull also dominated the following German Grand Prix with Webber taking his first pole and race win, despite being given a drive through penalty. Ferrari were also showing signs of improvement, Felipe Massa finishing third in what would be his final race of the season. He was hospitalised after being hit on the helmet by a flying spring when he was travelling at 162 mph in qualifying for the Hungarian Grand Prix. The accident overshadowed the race, with a lightly fueled Fernando Alonso on pole retiring early in the race, which was won by Lewis Hamilton. Jaime Alguersuari finished his début race ahead of Buemi, the Toro Rosso test driver replacing the fired Sébastien Bourdais. Post-race, the Renault team received a suspension for the European Grand Prix, for an incident where Alonso's tyre came loose on the race track following a pit-stop error. An appeal overturned the decision, and the team raced in Valencia.

During the summer break, BMW Sauber announced their withdrawal from Formula One racing due to poor results and lack of financial sustainability. The team would compete until the end of the season, while BMW attempted to sell the organisation. Seven-time champion Michael Schumacher was originally set to replace the injured Massa, but the seat was taken by test driver Luca Badoer due to Schumacher's neck injuries. Also replaced was Renault driver Nelson Piquet Jr., who complained of unfair treatment by team management, in favour of GP2 driver Romain Grosjean.

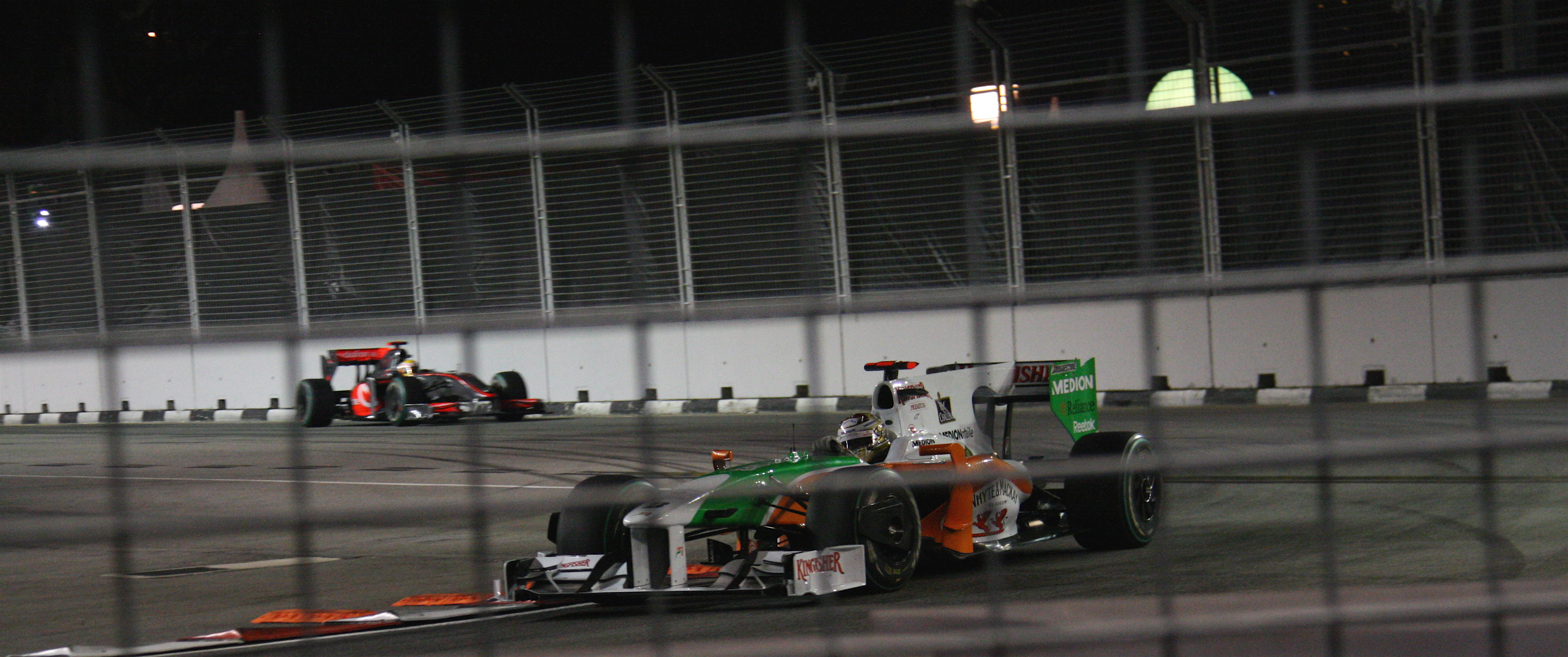
Force India and McLaren both came from the midfield to the points in 2009.

The European Grand Prix in Valencia provided the first win for Rubens Barrichello after Hamilton lost the lead with an error in the pits; he finished second while both Red Bulls failed to score. At the Belgian Grand Prix Giancarlo Fisichella gained Force India's first pole position, and his second-place finish behind Kimi Räikkönen gave their first points. Button's title charge was undermined by poor qualifying and a crash, involving him, Hamilton, Alguersuari and Grosjean, ending their races. Following the race Badoer, who had qualified and finished last in both races, was replaced with Giancarlo Fisichella after his performance at the Belgian race. Vitantonio Liuzzi in turn took the vacant Force India drive. Brawn returned to form in Italy, with Barrichello leading home the team's fourth 1–2 of the season. Lewis Hamilton crashed on the penultimate lap, but came back by winning the next race at Singapore. Webber's crash ended his chance of winning the championship. Vettel kept the opportunity of winning the Drivers' title with a dominant display in the Japanese Grand Prix, with Toyota's Trulli gaining what would prove to be Toyota's final podium before their withdrawal at the end of the season. Toyota teammate Glock was injured during qualifying, and a cracked vertebra meant he was replaced by reserve Kamui Kobayashi for the final two races.

The Drivers' and Constructors' championships were both decided at the penultimate race in Brazil. Storm-affected qualifying at Interlagos gave Barrichello pole during Formula One's longest qualifying session, while title rivals Button and Vettel started from 14th and 16th respectively. During the first lap, three incidents led to the retirement of three cars and a fire in the pit-lane, with Button taking advantage to move up the grid. Button fought up to fifth position by the race end, securing enough points to clinch the title. Mark Webber took the lead after Barrichello pitted and won the race, followed by Robert Kubica, to give BMW Sauber their joint best result of their final season and his only podium result in 2009. Lewis Hamilton completed the top three after starting 17th on the grid, moving him and McLaren above Kimi Räikkönen and Ferrari respectively in the championships. The inaugural Abu Dhabi Grand Prix, taking place at sunset, rounded out the season, with another win for Vettel and Red Bull's fourth 1–2 result of the year, awarding Vettel and the team second place in both championships.

=== 2008 race fixing controversy ===
In a scandal dubbed "Crashgate" by the media, allegations of race-fixing during the 2008 Singapore Grand Prix emerged during the second half of the 2009 season from former Renault driver Nelson Piquet Jr. Over the course of the 2009 Belgian Grand Prix, Piquet, who had been sacked weeks earlier by Renault, claimed he was asked to crash at the Singapore race in a strategy designed to aid teammate and eventual race winner Fernando Alonso. Renault were handed a two-year suspended ban from the sport after the FIA World Motor Sport Council decided the team's managing director, Flavio Briatore and its executive director of engineering, Pat Symonds had asked Piquet to crash. Both had left the team before the WMSC hearing, where they were given life and five-year suspensions respectively. It had been rumoured Renault were prepared to quit the sport at the end of the 2009 season had the team been heavily punished, but the FIA found Briatore and Symonds solely to blame and chose to suspend Renault's ban.

== Results and standings ==
=== Grands Prix ===
Round	Grand Prix	Pole position	Fastest lap	Winning driver	Winning constructor	Report
1	(Australia) Australian Grand Prix	(United Kingdom) Jenson Button	(Germany) Nico Rosberg	(United Kingdom) Jenson Button	(United Kingdom) Brawn-Mercedes	Report
2	(Malaysia) Malaysian Grand Prix	(United Kingdom) Jenson Button	(United Kingdom) Jenson Button	(United Kingdom) Jenson Button	(United Kingdom) Brawn-Mercedes	Report
3	(China) Chinese Grand Prix	(Germany) Sebastian Vettel	(Brazil) Rubens Barrichello	(Germany) Sebastian Vettel	(Austria) Red Bull-Renault	Report
4	Bahrain Grand Prix	(Italy) Jarno Trulli	(Italy) Jarno Trulli	(United Kingdom) Jenson Button	(United Kingdom) Brawn-Mercedes	Report
5	(Spain) Spanish Grand Prix	(United Kingdom) Jenson Button	(Brazil) Rubens Barrichello	(United Kingdom) Jenson Button	(United Kingdom) Brawn-Mercedes	Report
6	Monaco Grand Prix	(United Kingdom) Jenson Button	(Brazil) Felipe Massa	(United Kingdom) Jenson Button	(United Kingdom) Brawn-Mercedes	Report
7	(Turkey) Turkish Grand Prix	(Germany) Sebastian Vettel	(United Kingdom) Jenson Button	(United Kingdom) Jenson Button	(United Kingdom) Brawn-Mercedes	Report
8	(United Kingdom) British Grand Prix	(Germany) Sebastian Vettel	(Germany) Sebastian Vettel	(Germany) Sebastian Vettel	(Austria) Red Bull-Renault	Report
9	(Germany) German Grand Prix	(Australia) Mark Webber	(Spain) Fernando Alonso	(Australia) Mark Webber	(Austria) Red Bull-Renault	Report
10	(Hungary) Hungarian Grand Prix	(Spain) Fernando Alonso	(Australia) Mark Webber	(United Kingdom) Lewis Hamilton	(United Kingdom) McLaren-Mercedes	Report
11	(Spain) European Grand Prix	(United Kingdom) Lewis Hamilton	(Germany) Timo Glock	(Brazil) Rubens Barrichello	(United Kingdom) Brawn-Mercedes	Report
12	(Belgium) Belgian Grand Prix	(Italy) Giancarlo Fisichella	(Germany) Sebastian Vettel	(Finland) Kimi Räikkönen	(Italy) Ferrari	Report
13	(Italy) Italian Grand Prix	(United Kingdom) Lewis Hamilton	(Germany) Adrian Sutil	(Brazil) Rubens Barrichello	(United Kingdom) Brawn-Mercedes	Report
14	Singapore Grand Prix	(United Kingdom) Lewis Hamilton	(Spain) Fernando Alonso	(United Kingdom) Lewis Hamilton	(United Kingdom) McLaren-Mercedes	Report
15	(Japan) Japanese Grand Prix	(Germany) Sebastian Vettel	(Australia) Mark Webber	(Germany) Sebastian Vettel	(Austria) Red Bull-Renault	Report
16	(Brazil) Brazilian Grand Prix	(Brazil) Rubens Barrichello	(Australia) Mark Webber	(Australia) Mark Webber	(Austria) Red Bull-Renault	Report
17	(United Arab Emirates) Abu Dhabi Grand Prix	(United Kingdom) Lewis Hamilton	(Germany) Sebastian Vettel	(Germany) Sebastian Vettel	(Austria) Red Bull-Renault	Report

=== Scoring system ===
Points were awarded to the top eight classified finishers.

Position	1st	2nd	3rd	4th	5th	6th	7th	8th
Points	10	8	6	5	4	3	2	1

If two or more competitors had the same number of points (including 0 points), their positions in the championship were fixed according to the quality of their places. Under this system one first place was better than any number of second places, one second place was better than any number of third places, and so on.

=== World Drivers' Championship standings ===
Pos.	Driver	AUS (Australia)	MAL‡ (Malaysia)	CHN (China)	BHR (Bahrain)	ESP (Spain)	MON (Monaco)	TUR (Turkey)	GBR (United Kingdom)	GER (Germany)	HUN (Hungary)	EUR (Spain)	BEL (Belgium)	ITA (Italy)	SIN (Singapore)	JPN (Japan)	BRA (Brazil)	ABU (United Arab Emirates)	Points
1	(United Kingdom) Jenson Button	1^{P}	1^{P}^{F}	3	1	1^{P}	1^{P}	1^{F}	6	5	7	7	Ret	2	5	8	5	3	95
2	(Germany) Sebastian Vettel	13^{†}	15^{†}	1^{P}	2	4	Ret	3^{P}	1^{P}^{F}	2	Ret	Ret	3^{F}	8	4	1^{P}	4	1^{F}	84
3	(Brazil) Rubens Barrichello	2	5	4^{F}	5	2^{F}	2	Ret	3	6	10	1	7	1	6	7	8^{P}	4	77
4	(Australia) Mark Webber	12	6	2	11	3	5	2	2	1^{P}	3^{F}	9	9	Ret	Ret	17^{F}	1^{F}	2	69.5
5	(United Kingdom) Lewis Hamilton	DSQ	7	6	4	9	12	13	16	18	1	2^{P}	Ret	12^{P}^{†}	1^{P}	3	3	Ret^{P}	49
6	(Finland) Kimi Räikkönen	15^{†}	14	10	6	Ret	3	9	8	Ret	2	3	1	3	10	4	6	12	48
7	(Germany) Nico Rosberg	6^{F}	8	15	9	8	6	5	5	4	4	5	8	16	11	5	Ret	9	34.5
8	(Italy) Jarno Trulli	3	4	Ret	3^{P}^{F}	Ret	13	4	7	17	8	13	Ret	14	12	2	Ret	7	32.5
9	(Spain) Fernando Alonso	5	11	9	8	5	7	10	14	7^{F}	Ret^{P}	6	Ret	5	3^{F}	10	Ret	14	26
10	(Germany) Timo Glock	4	3	7	7	10	10	8	9	9	6	14^{F}	10	11	2	DNS			24
11	(Brazil) Felipe Massa	Ret	9	Ret	14	6	4^{F}	6	4	3	DNS								22
12	(Finland) Heikki Kovalainen	Ret	Ret	5	12	Ret	Ret	14	Ret	8	5	4	6	6	7	11	12	11	22
13	(Germany) Nick Heidfeld	10	2	12	19	7	11	11	15	10	11	11	5	7	Ret	6	Ret	5	19
14	(Poland) Robert Kubica	14^{†}	Ret	13	18	11	Ret	7	13	14	13	8	4	Ret	8	9	2	10	17
15	(Italy) Giancarlo Fisichella	11	18^{†}	14	15	14	9	Ret	10	11	14	12	2^{P}	9	13	12	10	16	8
16	(Switzerland) Sébastien Buemi	7	16^{†}	8	17	Ret	Ret	15	18	16	16	Ret	12	13^{†}	Ret	Ret	7	8	6
17	(Germany) Adrian Sutil	9	17	17^{†}	16	Ret	14	17	17	15	Ret	10	11	4^{F}	Ret	13	Ret	17	5
18	(Japan) Kamui Kobayashi																9	6	3
19	(France) Sébastien Bourdais	8	10	11	13	Ret	8	18	Ret	Ret									2
20	(Japan) Kazuki Nakajima	Ret	12	Ret	Ret	13	15^{†}	12	11	12	9	18^{†}	13	10	9	15	Ret	13	0
21	(Brazil) Nelson Piquet Jr.	Ret	13	16	10	12	Ret	16	12	13	12								0
22	(Italy) Vitantonio Liuzzi													Ret	14	14	11	15	0
23	(France) Romain Grosjean											15	Ret	15	Ret	16	13	18	0
24	(Spain) Jaime Alguersuari										15	16	Ret	Ret	Ret	Ret	14	Ret	0
25	(Italy) Luca Badoer											17	14						0
Pos.	Driver	AUS (Australia)	MAL‡ (Malaysia)	CHN (China)	BHR (Bahrain)	ESP (Spain)	MON (Monaco)	TUR (Turkey)	GBR (United Kingdom)	GER (Germany)	HUN (Hungary)	EUR (Spain)	BEL (Belgium)	ITA (Italy)	SIN (Singapore)	JPN (Japan)	BRA (Brazil)	ABU (United Arab Emirates)	Points

Key
Colour	Result
Gold	Winner
Silver	Second place
Bronze	Third place
Green	Other points position
Blue	Other classified position
Blue	Not classified, finished (NC)
Purple	Not classified, retired (Ret)
Red	Did not qualify (DNQ)
Black	Disqualified (DSQ)
White	Did not start (DNS)
White	Race cancelled (C)
Blank	Did not practice (DNP)
Blank	Excluded (EX)
Blank	Did not arrive (DNA)
Blank	Withdrawn (WD)
Blank	Did not enter (empty cell)
Annotation	Meaning
P	Pole position
F	Fastest lap

Notes:

- † – Driver did not finish the Grand Prix, but was classified as he completed more than 90% of the race distance.
- ‡ – Half points were awarded at the Malaysian Grand Prix as less than 75% of the scheduled distance was completed due to heavy rain.

=== World Constructors' Championship standings ===
Pos.	Constructor	No.	AUS (Australia)	MAL‡ (Malaysia)	CHN (China)	BHR (Bahrain)	ESP (Spain)	MON (Monaco)	TUR (Turkey)	GBR (United Kingdom)	GER (Germany)	HUN (Hungary)	EUR (Spain)	BEL (Belgium)	ITA (Italy)	SIN (Singapore)	JPN (Japan)	BRA (Brazil)	ABU (United Arab Emirates)	Points
1	(United Kingdom) Brawn-Mercedes	22	1^{P}	1^{P}^{F}	3	1	1^{P}	1^{P}	1^{F}	6	5	7	7	Ret	2	5	8	5	3	172
1	(United Kingdom) Brawn-Mercedes	23	2	5	4^{F}	5	2^{F}	2	Ret	3	6	10	1	7	1	6	7	8^{P}	4	172
2	(Austria) Red Bull-Renault	14	12	6	2	11	3	5	2	2	1^{P}	3^{F}	9	9	Ret	Ret	17^{F}	1^{F}	2	153.5
2	(Austria) Red Bull-Renault	15	13^{†}	15^{†}	1^{P}	2	4	Ret	3^{P}	1^{P}^{F}	2	Ret	Ret	3^{F}	8	4	1^{P}	4	1^{F}	153.5
3	(United Kingdom) McLaren-Mercedes	1	DSQ	7	6	4	9	12	13	16	18	1	2^{P}	Ret	12^{P}^{†}	1^{P}	3	3	Ret^{P}	71
3	(United Kingdom) McLaren-Mercedes	2	Ret	Ret	5	12	Ret	Ret	14	Ret	8	5	4	6	6	7	11	12	11	71
4	(Italy) Ferrari	3	Ret	9	Ret	14	6	4^{F}	6	4	3	DNS	17	14	9	13	12	10	16	70
4	(Italy) Ferrari	4	15^{†}	14	10	6	Ret	3	9	8	Ret	2	3	1	3	10	4	6	12	70
5	(Japan) Toyota	9	3	4	Ret	3^{P}^{F}	Ret	13	4	7	17	8	13	Ret	14	12	2	Ret	7	59.5
5	(Japan) Toyota	10	4	3	7	7	10	10	8	9	9	6	14^{F}	10	11	2	DNS	9	6	59.5
6	(Germany) BMW Sauber	5	14^{†}	Ret	13	18	11	Ret	7	13	14	13	8	4	Ret	8	9	2	10	36
6	(Germany) BMW Sauber	6	10	2	12	19	7	11	11	15	10	11	11	5	7	Ret	6	Ret	5	36
7	(United Kingdom) Williams-Toyota	16	6^{F}	8	15	9	8	6	5	5	4	4	5	8	16	11	5	Ret	9	34.5
7	(United Kingdom) Williams-Toyota	17	Ret	12	Ret	Ret	13	15^{†}	12	11	12	9	18	13	10	9	15	Ret	13	34.5
8	(France) Renault	7	5	11	9	8	5	7	10	14	7^{F}	Ret^{P}	6	Ret	5	3^{F}	10	Ret	14	26
8	(France) Renault	8	Ret	13	16	10	12	Ret	16	12	13	12	15	Ret	15	Ret	16	13	18	26
9	Force India-Mercedes	20	9	17	17^{†}	16	Ret	14	17	17	15	Ret	10	11	4^{F}	Ret	13	Ret	17	13
9	Force India-Mercedes	21	11	18^{†}	14	15	14	9	Ret	10	11	14	12	2^{P}	Ret	14	14	11	15	13
10	(Italy) Toro Rosso-Ferrari	11	8	10	11	13	Ret	8	18	Ret	Ret	15	16	Ret	Ret	Ret	Ret	14	Ret	8
10	(Italy) Toro Rosso-Ferrari	12	7	16^{†}	8	17	Ret	Ret	15	18	16	16	Ret	12	13^{†}	Ret	Ret	7	8	8
Pos.	Constructor	No.	AUS (Australia)	MAL‡ (Malaysia)	CHN (China)	BHR (Bahrain)	ESP (Spain)	MON (Monaco)	TUR (Turkey)	GBR (United Kingdom)	GER (Germany)	HUN (Hungary)	EUR (Spain)	BEL (Belgium)	ITA (Italy)	SIN (Singapore)	JPN (Japan)	BRA (Brazil)	ABU (United Arab Emirates)	Points

Key
Colour	Result
Gold	Winner
Silver	Second place
Bronze	Third place
Green	Other points position
Blue	Other classified position
Blue	Not classified, finished (NC)
Purple	Not classified, retired (Ret)
Red	Did not qualify (DNQ)
Black	Disqualified (DSQ)
White	Did not start (DNS)
White	Race cancelled (C)
Blank	Did not practice (DNP)
Blank	Excluded (EX)
Blank	Did not arrive (DNA)
Blank	Withdrawn (WD)
Blank	Did not enter (empty cell)
Annotation	Meaning
P	Pole position
F	Fastest lap

Notes:

- † – Driver did not finish the Grand Prix, but was classified as he completed more than 90% of the race distance.
- ‡ – Half points were awarded at the Malaysian Grand Prix as less than 75% of the scheduled distance was completed.
