= 2009 Spanish Grand Prix =

Coordinates: 41°34′12″N 2°15′40″E

Race 5 of 17 in the 2009 Formula One World Championship
| ← Previous race | Next race → |
- Circuit de Catalunya

Race details
- Date: 10 May 2009
- Official name: Formula 1 Gran Premio de España Telefónica 2009
- Location: Circuit de Catalunya, Montmeló, Catalonia, Spain
- Course: Permanent racing facility
- Course length: 4.655 km (2.892 miles)
- Distance: 66 laps, 307.104 km (190.826 miles)
- Weather: Warm, Sunny
- Attendance: 92,500

Pole position
| Driver | (United Kingdom) Jenson Button | Brawn-Mercedes |
- Time: 1:20.527

Fastest lap
| Driver | (Brazil) Rubens Barrichello | Brawn-Mercedes |
- Time: 1:22.762 on lap 28

Podium
| First | (United Kingdom) Jenson Button | Brawn-Mercedes |
| Second | (Brazil) Rubens Barrichello | Brawn-Mercedes |
| Third | (Australia) Mark Webber | Red Bull-Renault |

The 2009 Spanish Grand Prix (officially the Formula 1 Gran Premio de España Telefónica 2009) was a Formula One motor race held on 10 May 2009 at the Circuit de Catalunya in Montmeló, Spain. It was the fifth race of the 2009 Formula One season.

It resulted in a one-two finish by Brawn GP drivers Jenson Button and Rubens Barrichello, respectively.

== Report ==
=== Background ===
Brawn GP driver Jenson Button led the Drivers Championship by 12 points from teammate Rubens Barrichello, who was a further point ahead of Sebastian Vettel of Red Bull. The top six drivers were from the top three teams of Brawn, Red Bull and Toyota.

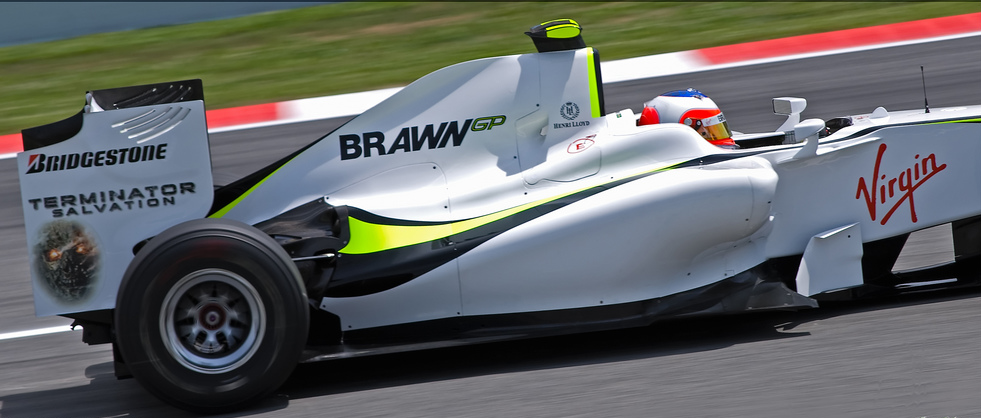
Brawn GP featured imagery from the film Terminator Salvation on their car.

Brawn GP led the Constructors' Championship by 22.5 points from Red Bull, who led Toyota by another point. McLaren were the only other team to reach double figures, having scored thirteen points.

The 2009 Spanish Grand Prix was widely anticipated as a restart to the season, with most teams bringing new developments to their cars. Brawn GP made their first upgrades to the BGP 001 in an attempt to remain at the front, whilst Ferrari introduced a new two-tier diffuser to the Ferrari F60, and reduced the weight of Kimi Räikkönen's car. Ferrari also ran KERS on both their cars, despite having reliability problems with it at previous races. Having run KERS on Nick Heidfeld's car for the first four races, and Robert Kubica's car in Bahrain, BMW Sauber raced without the system in Spain. This was due to a significant aerodynamic update to the F1.09 and the need to get the best out of it, which is limited with KERS' weight disadvantage. BMW's aerodynamic update included a new nose, front wing, revised sidepods, a new rear wing and an overall lightening of the chassis. In addition, BMW decided not to introduce a two-tier diffuser in Spain, claiming they would not have been able to exploit the performance benefit it gives. Force India also abandoned plans to run KERS to instead focus on aerodynamic developments, but may run the system later in the year according to team principal Vijay Mallya.

During the previous year's grand prix, McLaren driver Heikki Kovalainen suffered a large crash at turn nine of the circuit. After the race, Mark Webber, a director of the Grand Prix Drivers' Association, said that standards at the track should have been better. Speaking in his regular BBC Sport column, Webber said the run-off area at turn nine was too tight, which could cause an even more serious accident in the future without improvements. In response to this, the FIA made modifications to the track, in order to minimise the chances of such a severe accident happening again. The far side of the gravel trap at the turn was raised by 1.5 metres to give a gradual upward incline to slow down cars, while the gravel trap itself has been renewed. Improvements were made to the tyre barriers, to minimise the chances of a car penetrating the barriers again. Also, the kerb and artificial grass behind the track at turn nine were extended by ten metres.

=== Practice and qualifying ===
Three practice sessions were held before the race; of which two were held on Friday May 8, 2009, with the first in the morning and the second in the afternoon. Both sessions lasted 90 minutes with weather conditions sunny throughout. The third session was held on Saturday morning, lasting for 60 minutes.

In the first practice session, Jenson Button of Brawn GP set the fastest time of 1:21.799. Jarno Trulli of Toyota was second, with the two BMW Sauber cars of Robert Kubica and Nick Heidfeld third and fourth fastest. In the second practice session, Williams' driver Nico Rosberg went quickest with a time of 1.21.588. His teammate, Kazuki Nakajima, was second, with Renault's Fernando Alonso third. The third practice session saw Ferrari leading the way, Felipe Massa ahead of Kimi Räikkönen, with the two Brawn cars over half a second slower in third and fourth.

Qualifying on Saturday afternoon was split into three parts. At the end of the first session, Kimi Räikkönen was knocked out from 16th place. He later admitted his fault, believing his first qualifying lap was good enough to secure passage to the next session. Also knocked out were the Force India's of Giancarlo Fisichella and Adrian Sutil, McLaren's Heikki Kovalainen, and the Toro Rosso of Sébastien Bourdais. The second part of qualifying saw the Toro Rosso of Sébastien Buemi, McLaren's reigning world champion Lewis Hamilton, BMW's Heidfeld, Renault's Nelson Piquet, and Williams' Nakajima all fail to progress. Jenson Button claimed pole position in the final part of qualifying, starting his lap just two seconds before the session ended to put in a time of 1.20.527, one tenth quicker than second-placed Sebastian Vettel in the Red Bull. Button's teammate Rubens Barrichello was third quickest, with Ferrari's Felipe Massa and Red Bull's Mark Webber in fourth and fifth. Toyota's Timo Glock and Jarno Trulli were sixth and seventh fastest, in front of Renault's Alonso, Rosberg in the Williams, and the BMW of Kubica.

=== Race ===
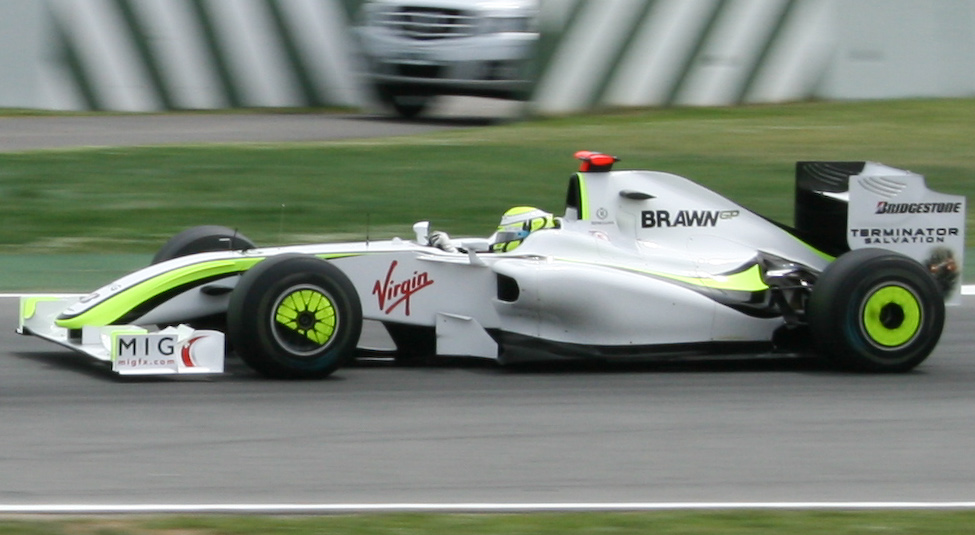
Jenson Button won his fourth race of the season.

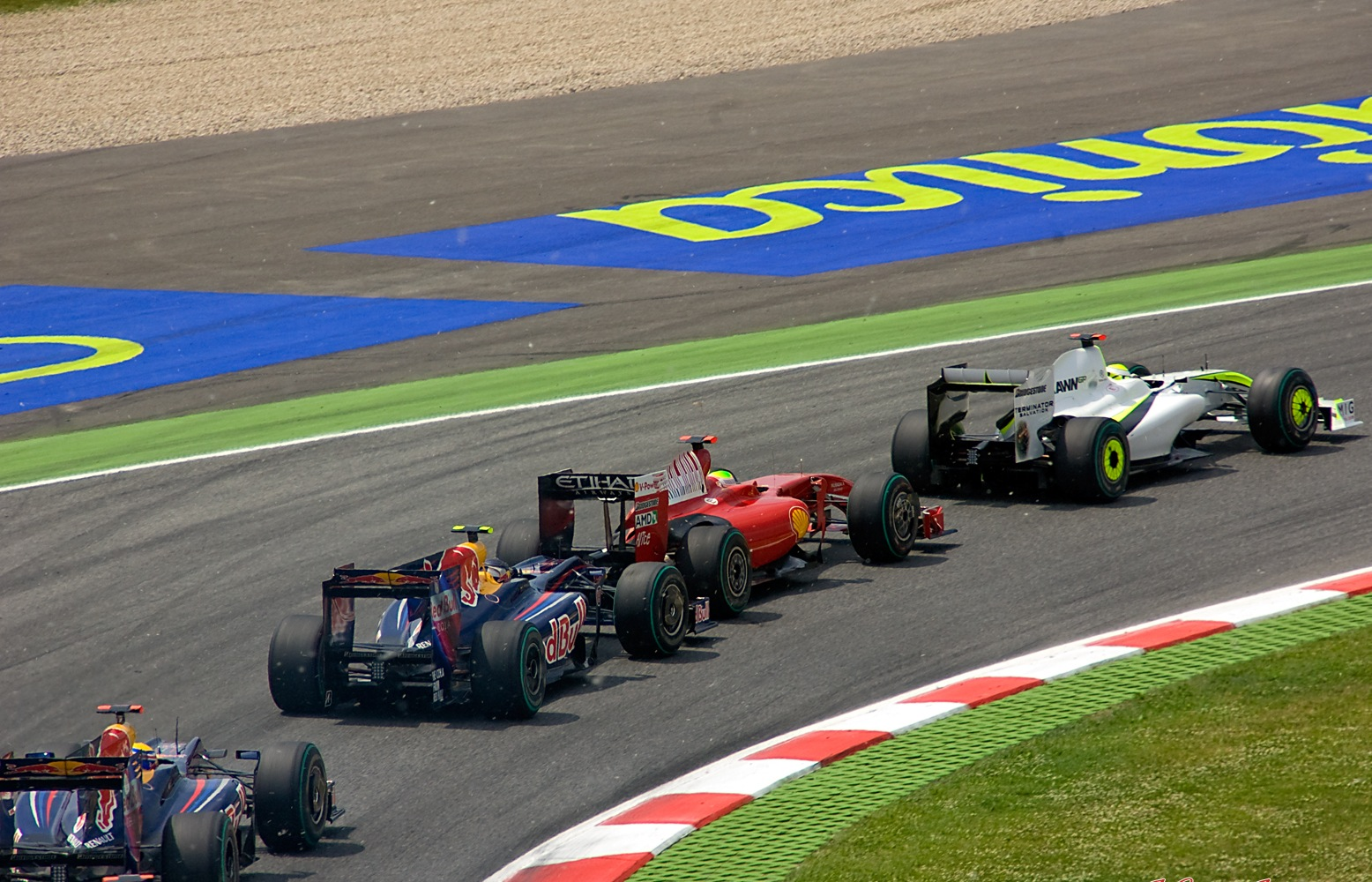
The first corner from leader to back: Button, Massa, Vettel, and Webber.

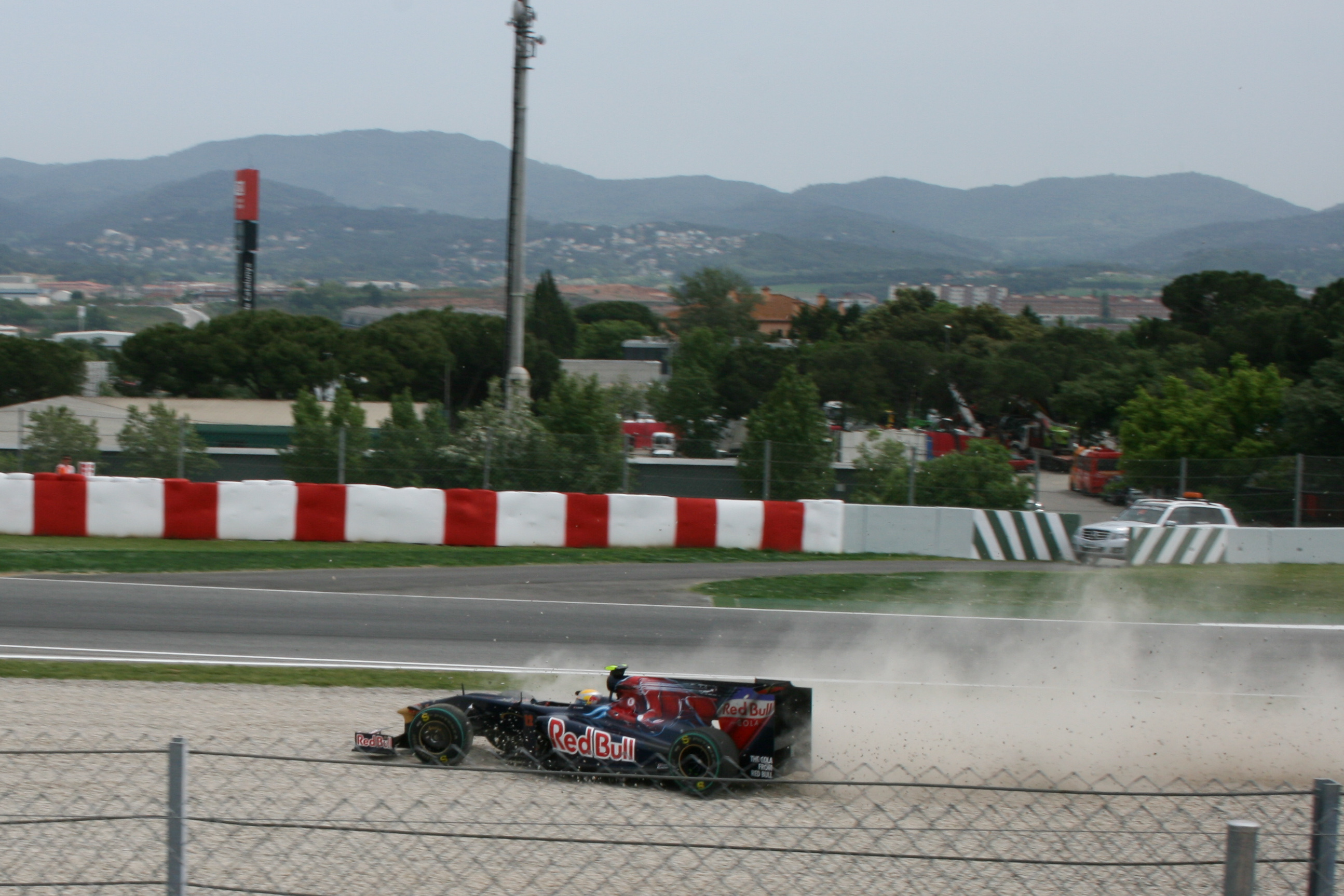
Sébastien Buemi's car spun off on lap 1.

Sébastien Buemi's car after his accident on lap 1.

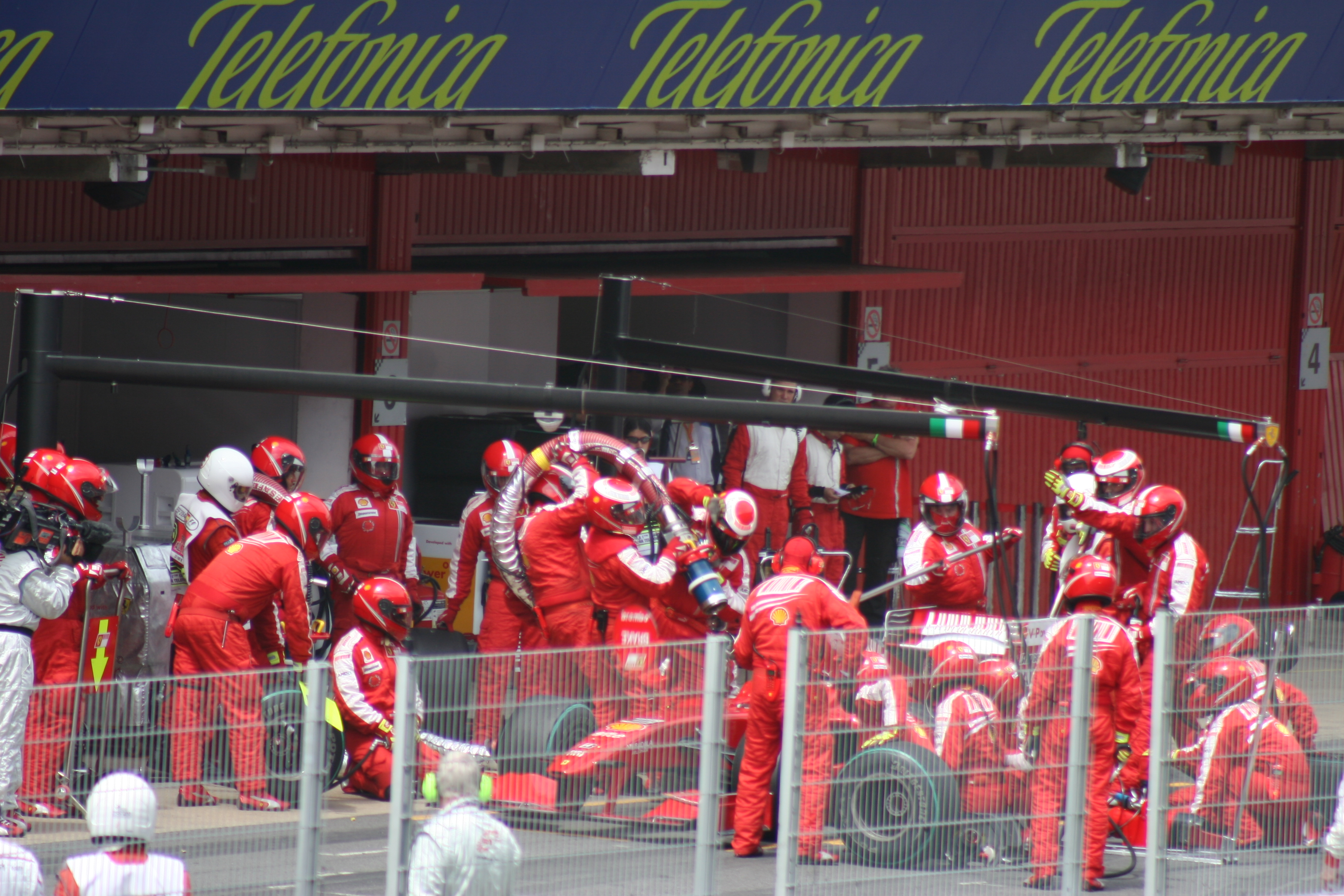
Ferrari suffered a refuelling problem with Felipe Massa's car that forced him to conserve fuel in the closing laps.

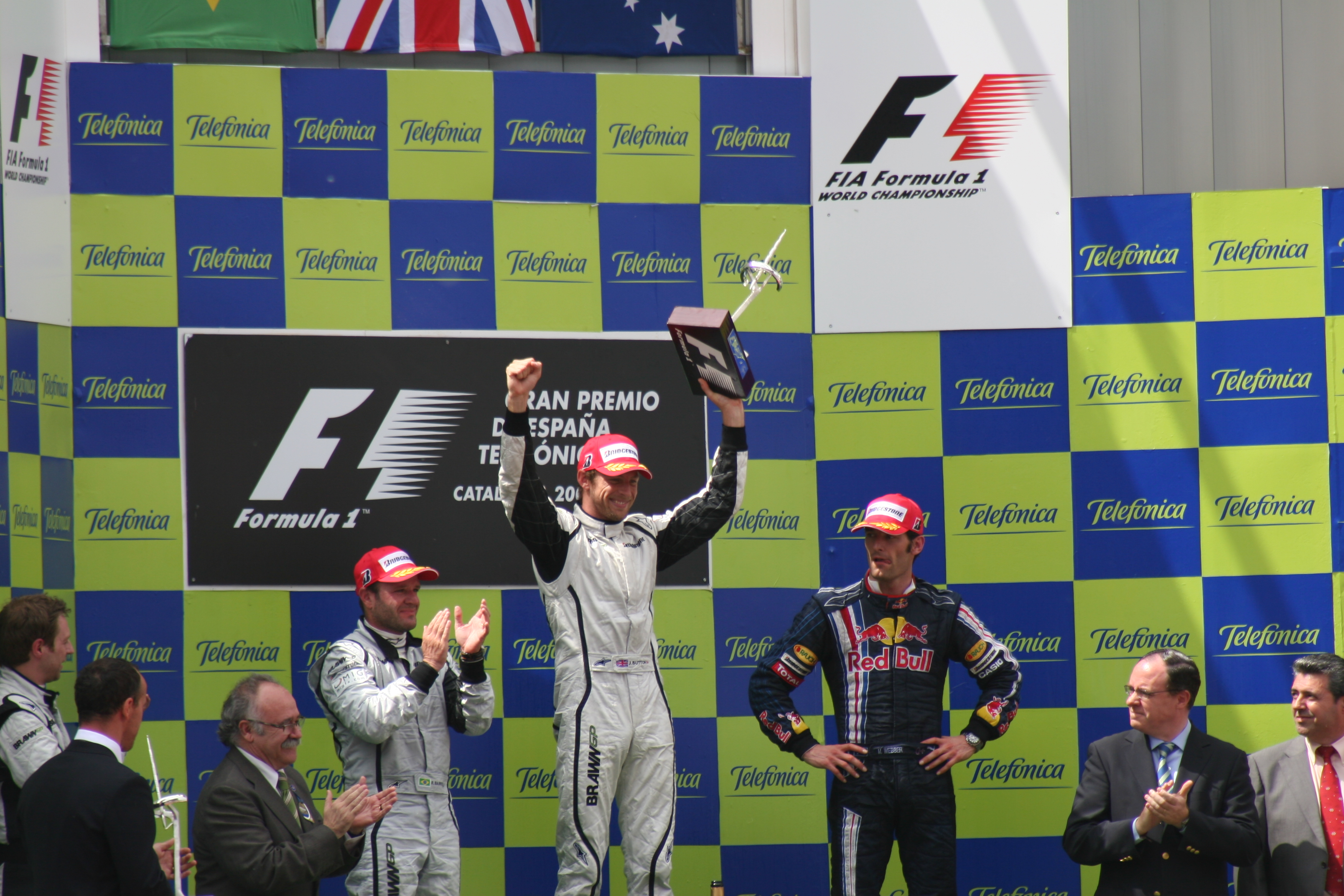
The podium, from left to right: Barrichello, Button and Webber.

Rubens Barrichello made the strongest start of the front-runners, and took the lead around the outside of the first corner. Jenson Button was running second, whilst the KERS-equipped Ferrari of Felipe Massa was able to gain one place from the start and was placed third ahead of Red Bull's Sebastian Vettel. Nico Rosberg made a particularly strong getaway from ninth, and ended up alongside Fernando Alonso in fifth place by the first braking zone.

An accident on the first lap of the race caused the retirement of Jarno Trulli, Adrian Sutil and both Toro Rosso drivers. Four laps behind the safety car followed while marshals cleared debris from the track. Replays of the incident showed that Nico Rosberg took evasive action at turn two having been squeezed by Alonso, and in re-joining the track forced Trulli into the gravel, where he lost control and spun back onto the track, hitting Sutil, then narrowly missing the other Force India car. Sébastien Buemi and Sébastien Bourdais collided in the aftermath of the initial carnage, when Buemi braked hard to avoid Trulli, and Bourdais ran into the back of his teammate. Lewis Hamilton had been forced onto the grass at the start by Nelson Piquet and had ended up at the back of the field, but was able to avoid the incidents in front of him. Shortly after the safety car pulled in and the race restarted, the McLaren of Heikki Kovalainen suffered from gearbox failure, forcing him to retire.

Barrichello pulled away from Button consistently during the first part of the race. After the first set of pit-stops, it was evident that Barrichello was running an aggressive three-stop strategy, while Button and the other front runners were making two stops. Barrichello, however, was unable to create enough of a gap to the chasing pack before his second pit-stop, and lost the lead to Button. After all the other drivers had pitted at least once, Barrichello found himself behind third-placed Massa and fourth-placed Vettel. After the last round of pit-stops were completed, Button was first, while Barrichello had moved up to second, and Red Bull's Mark Webber took third position – the result of a long second stint that Red Bull had opted for in order to emerge in front of the slower Ferrari of Massa. Button had originally been on the same three-stop strategy as Barrichello, but was switched to a two-stop strategy by the team to avoid exiting the pits into the dirty air of Rosberg's Williams.

Ferrari's problems continued as Kimi Räikkönen experienced hydraulic failure on his car, causing him to retire on lap 17. Massa had defended his position against Vettel throughout the afternoon, helped by his car's top speed advantage thanks to the KERS system, but late in the race, Ferrari identified a problem in that Massa was consuming more fuel than expected. As he could potentially run out of fuel before the end of the race, Massa was instructed to give up fourth place to Vettel with 5 laps remaining. By the final lap, he had dropped so far back in an effort to save fuel that he lost fifth place to Fernando Alonso, and nearly dropped behind Nick Heidfeld who was running seventh - 30 seconds behind Vettel.

Button took his fourth victory of the season, with Brawn GP claiming a one-two finish as Barrichello crossed the line 13 seconds later. Webber took the final podium position, with teammate Vettel behind him in fourth. Alonso was fifth, with Massa sixth. Heidfeld had to settle for seventh, in the process breaking Michael Schumacher's record of 24 consecutive finishes, while Nico Rosberg claimed the final point in eighth place. The reigning world champion Hamilton finished one lap down in ninth, followed by Glock, Kubica, Piquet, Nakajima and Fisichella. Webber claimed that driving a long stint with a heavy fuel load "felt as though [he] was towing a caravan."

== Classification ==
=== Qualifying ===
Cars that used KERS are marked with "‡"

| Pos | No | Driver | Constructor | Part 1 | Part 2 | Part 3 | Grid |
|---|---|---|---|---|---|---|---|
| 1 | 22 | (United Kingdom) Jenson Button | Brawn-Mercedes | 1:20.707 | 1:20.192 | 1:20.527 | 1 |
| 2 | 15 | (Germany) Sebastian Vettel | Red Bull-Renault | 1:20.715 | 1:20.220 | 1:20.660 | 2 |
| 3 | 23 | (Brazil) Rubens Barrichello | Brawn-Mercedes | 1:20.808 | 1:19.954 | 1:20.762 | 3 |
| 4 | 3‡ | (Brazil) Felipe Massa | Ferrari | 1:20.484 | 1:20.149 | 1:20.934 | 4 |
| 5 | 14 | (Australia) Mark Webber | Red Bull-Renault | 1:20.689 | 1:20.007 | 1:21.049 | 5 |
| 6 | 10 | (Germany) Timo Glock | Toyota | 1:20.877 | 1:20.107 | 1:21.247 | 6 |
| 7 | 9 | (Italy) Jarno Trulli | Toyota | 1:21.189 | 1:20.420 | 1:21.254 | 7 |
| 8 | 7‡ | (Spain) Fernando Alonso | Renault | 1:21.186 | 1:20.509 | 1:21.392 | 8 |
| 9 | 16 | (Germany) Nico Rosberg | Williams-Toyota | 1:20.745 | 1:20.256 | 1:22.558 | 9 |
| 10 | 5 | (Poland) Robert Kubica | BMW Sauber | 1:20.931 | 1:20.408 | 1:22.685 | 10 |
| 11 | 17 | (Japan) Kazuki Nakajima | Williams-Toyota | 1:20.818 | 1:20.531 | | 11 |
| 12 | 8 | (Brazil) Nelson Piquet Jr. | Renault | 1:21.128 | 1:20.604 | | 12 |
| 13 | 6 | (Germany) Nick Heidfeld | BMW Sauber | 1:21.095 | 1:20.676 | | 13 |
| 14 | 1‡ | (United Kingdom) Lewis Hamilton | McLaren-Mercedes | 1:20.991 | 1:20.805 | | 14 |
| 15 | 12 | (Switzerland) Sébastien Buemi | Toro Rosso-Ferrari | 1:21.033 | 1:21.067 | | 15 |
| 16 | 4‡ | (Finland) Kimi Räikkönen | Ferrari | 1:21.291 | | | 16 |
| 17 | 11 | (France) Sébastien Bourdais | Toro Rosso-Ferrari | 1:21.300 | | | 17 |
| 18 | 2‡ | (Finland) Heikki Kovalainen | McLaren-Mercedes | 1:21.675 | | | 18 |
| 19 | 20 | (Germany) Adrian Sutil | Force India-Mercedes | 1:21.742 | | | 19 |
| 20 | 21 | (Italy) Giancarlo Fisichella | Force India-Mercedes | 1:22.204 | | | 20 |

=== Race ===
| Pos | No | Driver | Constructor | Laps | Time/Retired | Grid | Points |
|---|---|---|---|---|---|---|---|
| 1 | 22 | (United Kingdom) Jenson Button | Brawn-Mercedes | 66 | 1:37:19.202 | 1 | 10 |
| 2 | 23 | (Brazil) Rubens Barrichello | Brawn-Mercedes | 66 | +13.056 | 3 | 8 |
| 3 | 14 | (Australia) Mark Webber | Red Bull-Renault | 66 | +13.924 | 5 | 6 |
| 4 | 15 | (Germany) Sebastian Vettel | Red Bull-Renault | 66 | +18.941 | 2 | 5 |
| 5 | 7‡ | (Spain) Fernando Alonso | Renault | 66 | +43.166 | 8 | 4 |
| 6 | 3‡ | (Brazil) Felipe Massa | Ferrari | 66 | +50.827 | 4 | 3 |
| 7 | 6 | (Germany) Nick Heidfeld | BMW Sauber | 66 | +52.312 | 13 | 2 |
| 8 | 16 | (Germany) Nico Rosberg | Williams-Toyota | 66 | +1:05.211 | 9 | 1 |
| 9 | 1‡ | (United Kingdom) Lewis Hamilton | McLaren-Mercedes | 65 | +1 Lap | 14 | |
| 10 | 10 | (Germany) Timo Glock | Toyota | 65 | +1 Lap | 6 | |
| 11 | 5 | (Poland) Robert Kubica | BMW Sauber | 65 | +1 Lap | 10 | |
| 12 | 8 | (Brazil) Nelson Piquet Jr. | Renault | 65 | +1 Lap | 12 | |
| 13 | 17 | (Japan) Kazuki Nakajima | Williams-Toyota | 65 | +1 Lap | 11 | |
| 14 | 21 | (Italy) Giancarlo Fisichella | Force India-Mercedes | 65 | +1 Lap | 20 | |
| Ret | 4‡ | (Finland) Kimi Räikkönen | Ferrari | 17 | Hydraulics | 16 | |
| Ret | 2‡ | (Finland) Heikki Kovalainen | McLaren-Mercedes | 7 | Gearbox | 18 | |
| Ret | 9 | (Italy) Jarno Trulli | Toyota | 0 | Collision | 7 | |
| Ret | 12 | (Switzerland) Sébastien Buemi | Toro Rosso-Ferrari | 0 | Collision | 15 | |
| Ret | 11 | (France) Sébastien Bourdais | Toro Rosso-Ferrari | 0 | Collision | 17 | |
| Ret | 20 | (Germany) Adrian Sutil | Force India-Mercedes | 0 | Collision | 19 | |

== Championship standings after the race ==
Drivers' Championship standings

| | Pos. | Driver | Points |
|---|---|---|---|
| | 1 | (United Kingdom) Jenson Button | 41 |
| | 2 | (Brazil) Rubens Barrichello | 27 |
| | 3 | (Germany) Sebastian Vettel | 23 |
| 2 | 4 | (Australia) Mark Webber | 15.5 |
| 1 | 5 | (Italy) Jarno Trulli | 14.5 |

Constructors' Championship standings

| Pos. | Constructor | Points |
|---|---|---|
| 1 | (United Kingdom) Brawn-Mercedes | 68 |
| 2 | (Austria) Red Bull-Renault | 38.5 |
| 3 | (Japan) Toyota | 26.5 |
| 4 | (United Kingdom) McLaren-Mercedes | 13 |
| 5 | (France) Renault | 9 |

- Note: Only the top five positions are included for both sets of standings.

== See also ==
- 2009 Catalunya GP2 Series round

| Previous race: 2009 Bahrain Grand Prix | FIA Formula One World Championship; 2009 season | Next race: 2009 Monaco Grand Prix |
| Previous race: 2008 Spanish Grand Prix | Spanish Grand Prix | Next race: 2010 Spanish Grand Prix |
