= Laureus World Sports Award for Team of the Year =

- Paris Saint-Germain F.C., 2026 winner
- Awarded for: "team that best demonstrates supreme performance and achievements – such as world, continental, international or national and major championship titles"
- Location: Madrid (2026)
- Presented by: Laureus Sport for Good Foundation
- First award: 2000
- Currently held by: (France) Paris Saint-Germain (2026)
- Website: Official website

The Laureus World Sports Award for Team of the Year is an award honouring the achievements of those teams who have demonstrated "supreme performance" in the world of sports. It was first awarded in 2000 as one of the seven constituent awards presented during the Laureus World Sports Awards. The awards are presented by the Laureus Sport for Good Foundation, a global organisation involved in more than 150 charity projects supporting 500,000 young people. The first ceremony was held on 25 May 2000 in Monte Carlo, at which Nelson Mandela gave the keynote speech. As of 2020, a shortlist of six nominees for the award comes from a panel composed of the "world's leading sports editors, writers and broadcasters". The Laureus World Sports Academy then selects the winner who is presented with a Laureus statuette, created by Cartier, at an annual awards ceremony held in various locations around the world. The awards are considered highly prestigious and are frequently referred to as the sporting equivalent of "Oscars".

The inaugural winner of the award was English football team Manchester United, who had completed an "historic treble" by winning the UEFA Champions League, the Premier League and the FA Cup during the 1998–99 season. Football teams, including both domestic and international sides, have won more awards than any other sport with eleven, followed by rugby union (four) and Formula One teams (three). Teams from France, Germany and Spain have won the award three times, while teams from England and South Africa have won it twice. The 2026 winner of the Laureus World Sports Award for Team of the Year was the Paris Saint-Germain FC.

== List of winners and nominees ==
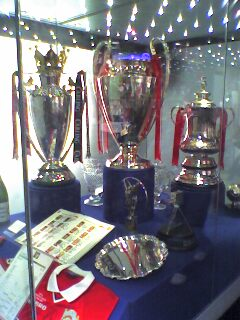
Manchester United won three trophies in the 1998–99 season, and earned the inaugural Laureus team award in 2000.

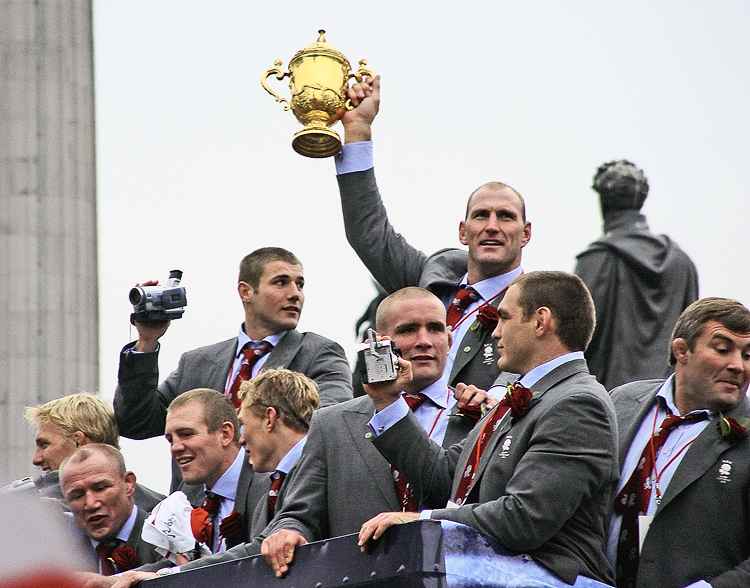
England's rugby union team won the World Cup in 2003, and won the Laureus team award the following year.

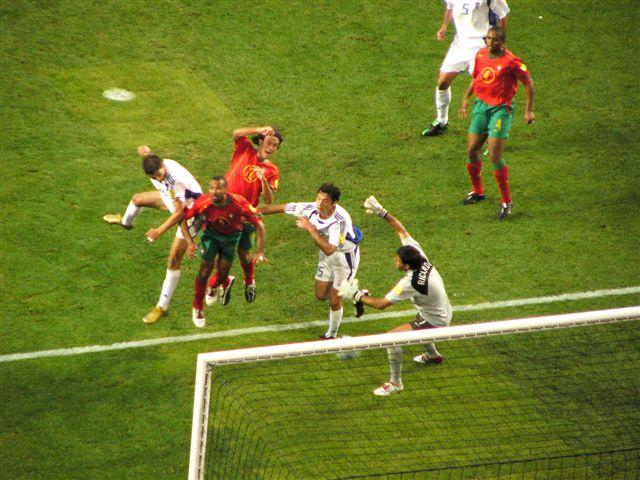
Angelos Charisteas scoring Greece's winning goal in the Euro 2004 final – his team received the award in 2005

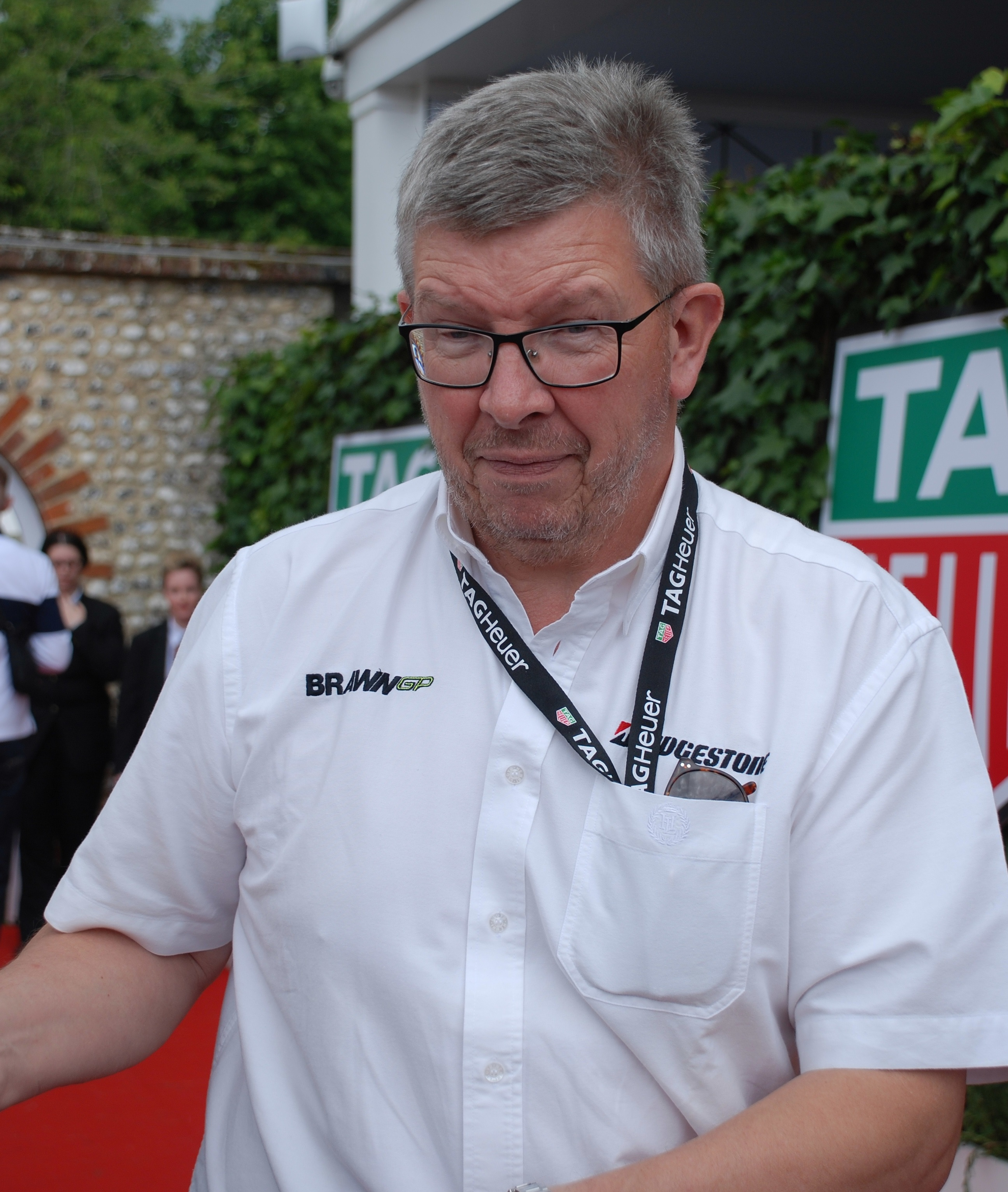
Ross Brawn's Formula One team Brawn GP won the award in 2010.

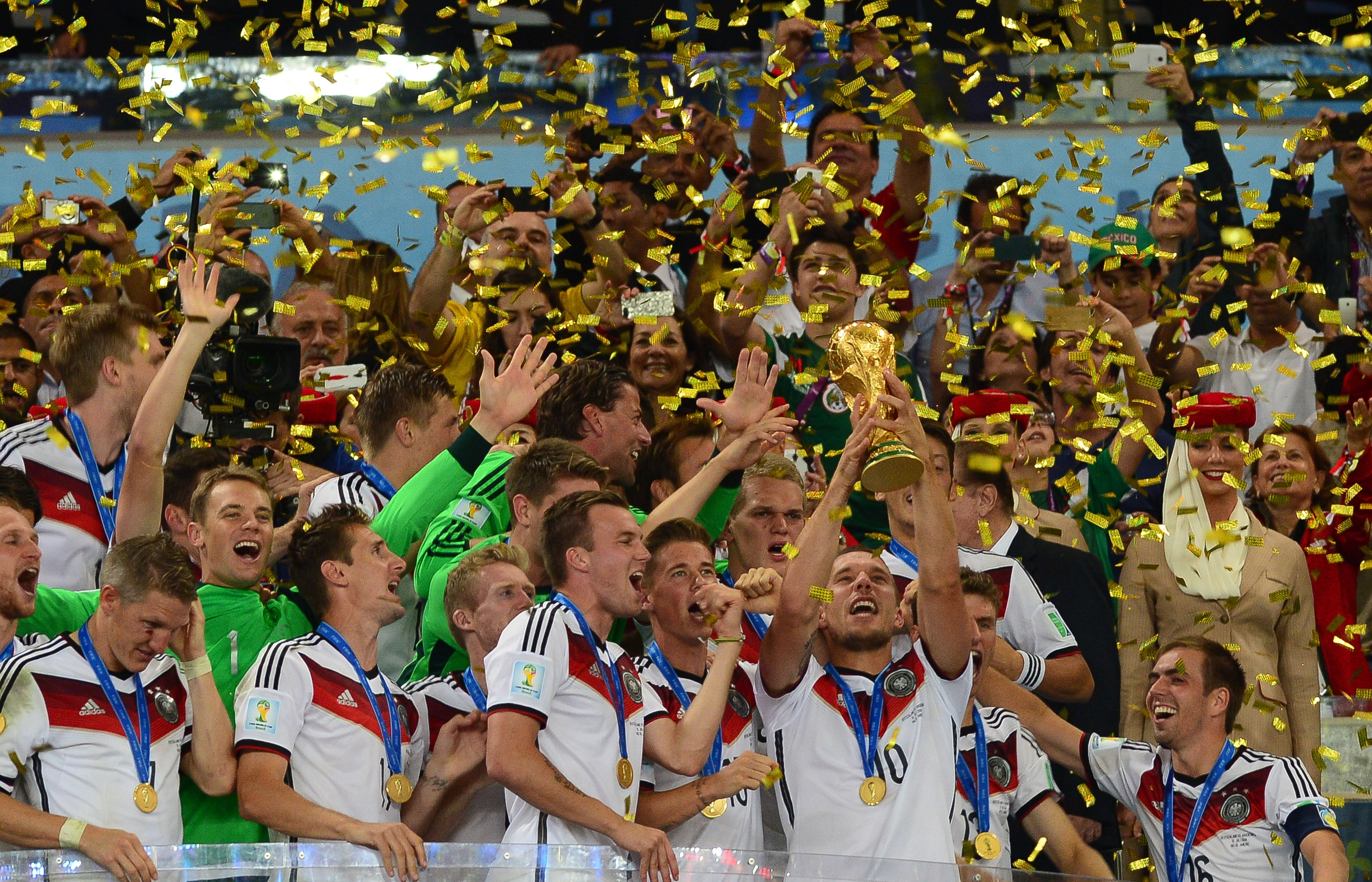
Germany lifting the World Cup trophy in 2014 – the team won the Laureus award in 2015

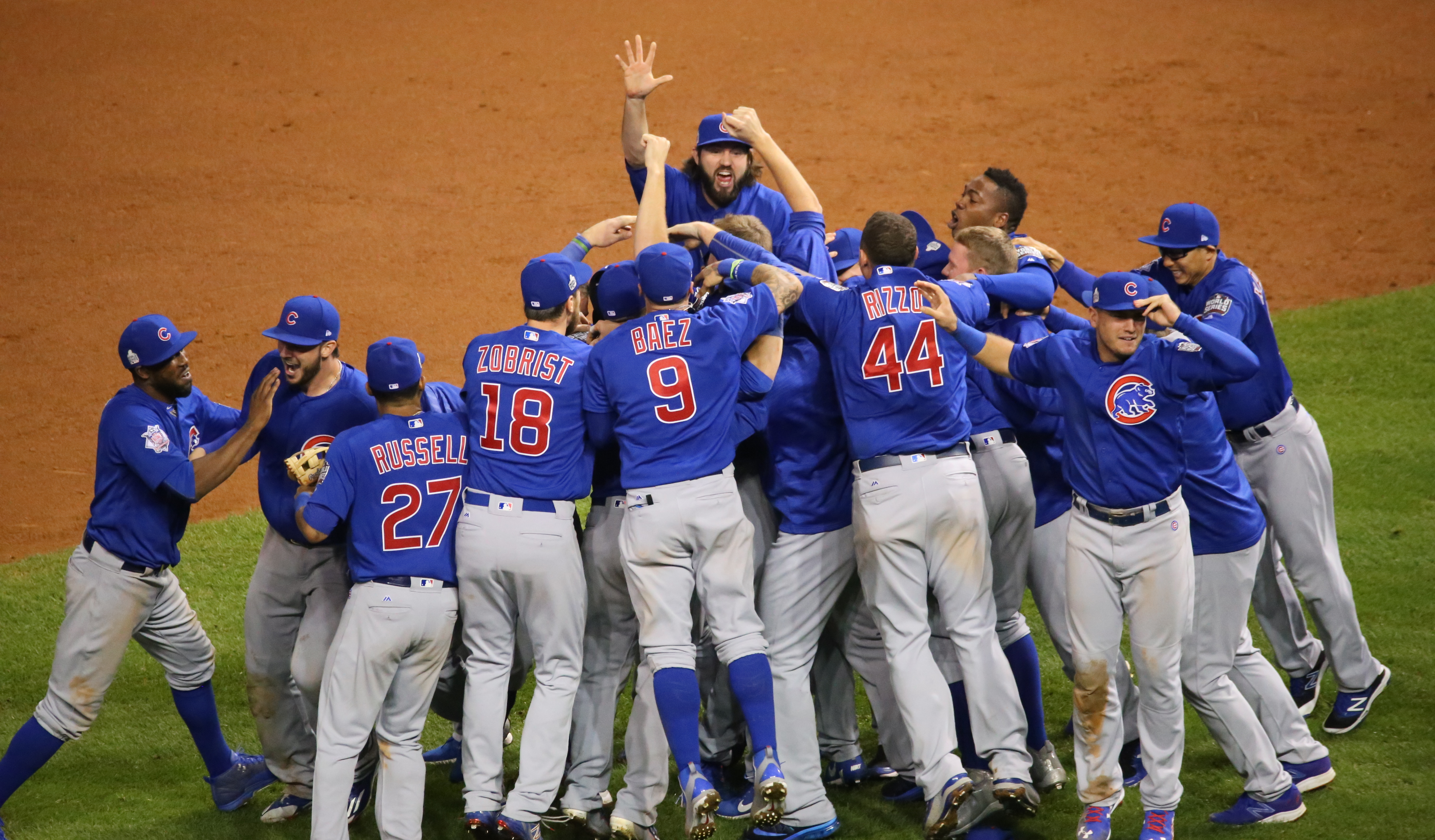
The Chicago Cubs celebrating winning the 2016 World Series – they were the 2017 recipients of the Laureus team award.

Laureus World Sports Award for Team of the Year winners and nominees
Year	Winner	Nationality	Sport	Achievement(s)	Nominees	Refs
2000	Manchester United	GBR	Association football	Won the treble (UEFA Champions League, FA Premier League, FA Cup)	Australia Rugby Union Team (AUS) – rugby union United States Women's Soccer Team (USA) – football	
2001	France Men's Football Team	FRA	Association football	Won UEFA Euro 2000	Australia Men's Cricket Team (AUS) – cricket Cameroon Olympic Football Team (CMR) – football New York Yankees (USA) – baseball Real Madrid (ESP) – football	
2002	Australia Men's Cricket Team	AUS	Cricket	Extended their winning streak to 16 Test victories	Bayern Munich (GER) – football French Davis Cup Team (FRA) – tennis Scuderia Ferrari (ITA) – Formula One; Los Angeles Lakers (USA) – basketball	
2003	Brazil Men's Football Team	BRA	Association football	Won the 2002 FIFA World Cup	Canada Men's Ice Hockey Team (CAN) – ice hockey Europe Ryder Cup Team (Europe) – golf Scuderia Ferrari (ITA) – Formula One; Real Madrid (ESP) – football	
2004	England Rugby Union Team	GBR	Rugby union	Won the 2003 Rugby World Cup	AC Milan (ITA) – football Alinghi America's Cup Team (SUI) – yachting Australia Men's Cricket Team (AUS) – cricket Scuderia Ferrari (ITA) – Formula One; Germany Women's Football Team (GER) – football	
2005	Greece Men's Football Team	GRE	Association football	Won UEFA Euro 2004	Argentina Men's Olympic Basketball Team (ARG) – basketball Boston Red Sox (USA) – baseball Europe Ryder Cup Team (Europe) – golf FC Porto (POR) – football Scuderia Ferrari (ITA) – Formula One	
2006	Renault Formula One Team	FRA	Formula One	Won the 2005 FIA Formula One World Constructor's Championship	FC Barcelona (ESP) – football Croatia Davis Cup Team (CRO) – tennis Liverpool F.C. (GBR) – football New Zealand Rugby Union Team (NZL) – rugby union San Antonio Spurs (USA) – basketball	
2007	Italy Men's Football Team	ITA	Association football	Won the 2006 FIFA World Cup	New Zealand Rugby Union Team (NZL) – rugby union FC Barcelona (ESP) – football Europe Ryder Cup Team (Europe) – golf Renault Formula One Team (FRA) – Formula One; Spain Men's Basketball Team (ESP) – basketball	
2008	South Africa Rugby Union Team	RSA	Rugby union	Won the 2007 Rugby World Cup	Australia Men's Cricket Team (AUS) – cricket Scuderia Ferrari (ITA) – Formula One; Germany Women's Football Team (GER) – football Iraq Men's Football Team (IRQ) – football AC Milan (ITA) – football	
2009	China Olympic Team	CHN	Summer Olympics	Topped the medal table at the 2008 Summer Olympics with 48 gold medals	Boston Celtics (USA) – basketball Great Britain Olympic Cycling Team (GBR) – cycling Jamaica Olympic Sprint Team (JAM) – athletics Manchester United (GBR) – football Spain Men's Football Team (ESP) – football	
2010	Brawn Formula One Team	GBR	Formula One	Won the 2009 FIA Formula One World Constructors' Championship	FC Barcelona (ESP) – football New York Yankees (USA) – baseball Germany Women's Football Team (GER) – football Los Angeles Lakers (USA) – basketball South African Rugby Union Team (RSA) – rugby union	
2011	Spain Men's Football Team	ESP	Association football	Won the 2010 FIFA World Cup	Inter Milan (ITA) – football New Zealand Rugby Union Team (NZL) – rugby union Europe Ryder Cup Team (Europe) – golf Los Angeles Lakers (USA) – basketball Red Bull Formula One Team (AUT) – Formula One	
2012	FC Barcelona	ESP	Association football	Won third consecutive La Liga title, the UEFA Champions League, Spanish and UEFA Super Cups, and the 2011 FIFA Club World Cup	New Zealand Rugby Union Team (NZL) – rugby union England Cricket Team (GBR) – cricket Japan Women's Football Team (JPN) – football Dallas Mavericks (USA) – basketball Red Bull Formula One Team (AUT) – Formula One	
2013	Europe Ryder Cup Team	Europe	Golf	Won the 2012 Ryder Cup	China Olympic Table Tennis Team (CHN) – table tennis Miami Heat (USA) – basketball Red Bull Formula One Team (AUT) – Formula One; Spain Men's Football Team (ESP) – association football United States Men's Basketball Team (USA) – basketball	
2014	Bayern Munich	GER	Association football	Won the treble (UEFA Champions League, Bundesliga, German Cup)	New Zealand Rugby Union Team (NZL) – rugby union Brazil Men's Football Team (BRA) – football Bob and Mike Bryan (USA) – tennis Miami Heat (USA) – basketball Red Bull Formula One Team (AUT) – Formula One	
2015	Germany Men's Football Team	GER	Association football	Won the 2014 FIFA World Cup	Europe Ryder Cup Team (Europe) – golf Real Madrid (ESP) – football Switzerland Davis Cup Team (SUI) – tennis San Antonio Spurs (USA) – basketball Mercedes AMG Petronas (GER) – Formula One	
2016	New Zealand Rugby Union Team	NZL	Rugby union	Won the 2015 Rugby World Cup	FC Barcelona (ESP) – football Golden State Warriors (USA) – basketball Great Britain Davis Cup Team (GBR) – tennis Mercedes AMG Petronas (GER) – Formula One; United States Women's Soccer Team (USA) – football	
2017	Chicago Cubs	USA	Baseball	Won the 2016 World Series	Cleveland Cavaliers (USA) – basketball Mercedes AMG Petronas (GER) – Formula One; Portugal Men's Football Team (POR) – football Brazil Men's Olympic Football Team (BRA) – football Real Madrid (ESP) – football	
2018	Mercedes Formula One Team	GER	Formula One	Won the Drivers and Constructors 2017 FIA Formula One World Championship	France Davis Cup Team (FRA) – Tennis; Golden State Warriors (USA) – basketball New Zealand America's Cup Sailing Team (NZL) – yachting New England Patriots (USA) – American football Real Madrid (ESP) – Football	
2019	France Men's Football Team	FRA	Association football	Won the 2018 FIFA World Cup	Mercedes Formula One Team (GER) – Formula One; Real Madrid (ESP) – football Norway Winter Olympic Team (NOR) – Winter Olympics; Golden State Warriors (USA) – basketball Europe Ryder Cup Team (Europe) – golf	
2020	South Africa Rugby Union Team	RSA	Rugby union	Won the 2019 Rugby World Cup and 2019 Rugby Championship	Liverpool F.C. (GBR) – football Mercedes Formula One Team (GER) – Formula One; Spain Men's Basketball Team (ESP) – basketball Toronto Raptors (CAN) – basketball United States Women's Soccer Team (USA) – football	
2021	Bayern Munich	GER	Association football	Won the sextuple (UEFA Champions League, Bundesliga, German Cup, German Supercup, UEFA Super Cup, and FIFA Club World Cup)	Argentina Rugby Union Team (ARG) – rugby union Kansas City Chiefs (USA) – American football Liverpool F.C. (GBR) – Association football Los Angeles Lakers (USA) – basketball Mercedes Formula One Team (GER) – Formula One	
2022	Italy Men's Football Team	ITA	Association football	Won the UEFA Euro 2020, set a world record of 37 games unbeaten	Argentina Men's Football Team (ARG) – football Barcelona Women's Football Team (ESP) – Association football China Olympic Diving Team (CHN) – diving Mercedes Formula One Team (GER) – Formula One; Milwaukee Bucks (USA) – basketball	
2023	Argentina Men's Football Team	ARG	Association football	Won the 2022 FIFA World Cup	Real Madrid (ESP) – Association football France Rugby Union Team (FRA) – rugby union England Women's Football Team (GBR) – Association football Red Bull Racing (AUT) – Formula One; Golden State Warriors (USA) – basketball	
2024	Spain Women's Football Team	ESP	Association football	Won the 2023 FIFA Women's World Cup	Europe Ryder Cup Team (Europe) – Golf; Germany Men's Basketball Team (GER) – basketball Manchester City (GBR) – football Red Bull Racing (AUT) – Formula One; South Africa Rugby Union Team (RSA) – rugby union	
2025	Real Madrid	ESP	Association football	Won La Liga and the UEFA Champions League	Boston Celtics (USA) – basketball FC Barcelona Femení (ESP) – football McLaren Formula 1 Team (GBR) – Formula One; Spain Men's Football Team (ESP) – football United States Men's Basketball Team (USA) – basketball	
2026	Paris Saint-Germain FC	FRA	Association football	Won Ligue 1, Coupe de France, Trophée des Champions, UEFA Super Cup, FIFA Intercontinental Cup and UEFA Champions League	England Women's Football Team (GBR) – football Europe Ryder Cup Team (Europe) – golf India Women's Cricket Team (IND) – cricket McLaren Formula 1 Team (GBR) – Formula One; Oklahoma City Thunder (USA) – basketball	
