= Brawn GP =

Formula One motor racing team

Coordinates: 52°01′19″N 1°08′42″W

Brawn
- Full name: Brawn GP Formula One Team
- Base: Brackley, Northamptonshire, England
- Founder(s): Ross Brawn
- Noted staff: Loïc Bigois; Peter Bonnington; Ross Brawn; Simon Cole; Jock Clear; Matt Deane; Nick Fry; Ron Meadows; Riccardo Musconi; Gary Savage; Andrew Shovlin; James Vowles; Jörg Zander
- Noted drivers: (United Kingdom) Jenson Button (Brazil) Rubens Barrichello
- Previous name: Honda Racing F1 Team
- Next name: Mercedes-AMG Petronas Formula One Team

Formula One World Championship career
- First entry: 2009 Australian Grand Prix
- Races entered: 17
- Engines: Mercedes
- Constructors' Championships: 1 (2009)
- Drivers' Championships: 1 (2009)
- Race victories: 8
- Podiums: 15
- Points: 172
- Pole positions: 5
- Fastest laps: 4
- Final entry: 2009 Abu Dhabi Grand Prix

Brawn GP was a Formula One constructor which competed in the 2009 Formula One World Championship, with drivers Jenson Button and Rubens Barrichello. The team was formed in 2009 by a management buyout led by Ross Brawn of the Honda Racing F1 Team, after Honda announced their withdrawal from the sport in December 2008 due to the 2008 financial crisis, while other teams like Toyota and BMW Sauber raced in F1 until the end of the 2009 season, also choosing to depart from the sport. The team is famous for its symbolic £1 sale from Hiroshi Oshima to Ross Brawn. The team started development of their car in early 2008, when still owned by Honda. The car was originally named the RA109 until the team rebranded to Brawn GP, to which the car was redesigned to fit the Mercedes engine and was subsequently renamed the BGP-001. For the 2009 season, Honda provided a $100 million budget, while Mercedes provided engines under a customer relationship. This evolved into a buyout of the team in November 2009 by Mercedes.

Pre-season testing quickly revealed that the car was highly competitive. One of its key innovations was a controversial aerodynamic feature known as the double diffuser, which provided a significant downforce advantage over many rival teams early in the season, and was protested by Ferrari, Red Bull Racing, and Renault F1 Team. The design was then declared legal in April 2009 by the governing body of the sport, the FIA. On its racing debut, the season-opening 2009 Australian Grand Prix, the team took pole position and second place in qualifying and went on to finish first and second in the race. Button won six of the first seven races of the season. At the 2009 Brazilian Grand Prix on the 18th of October, he finished 5th after starting 14th to secure the 2009 Drivers' Championship, while the team won the Constructors' Championship. Barrichello won twice and finished third in the Drivers' Championship. The team won eight of the season's seventeen races and took both titles in its only year of competition. As a result of this being their only year in Formula One, Brawn GP is the only Constructor with a 100% title rate. The team obtained fifteen podiums, five pole positions and four fastest laps in 2009. With a total of 172 points, its average is 10.12 points per Grand Prix. In 2010, Brawn GP received the Laureus World Sports Awards for Team of the Year.

On 16 November 2009, it was confirmed that the team's engine supplier, Mercedes-Benz, in partnership with Aabar Investments, had purchased a 75.1% stake in Brawn GP, which was renamed Mercedes GP for the 2010 season. Many of the Brawn GP former employees were retained by the new Mercedes team following the buyout. Now known as the Mercedes-AMG Petronas Formula One Team, the team is considered to be the 2nd most successful constructor behind Ferrari in Formula One, with 8 consecutive constructor titles and 7 consecutive drivers titles, from 2014 to 2021 and 2014 to 2020 respectively.

== History ==
=== Origins ===
Brawn GP had its origins in the Tyrrell Racing Organisation, a motorsport team founded by Ken Tyrrell in 1958 which entered cars in various single-seater championships. After entering Formula One in 1968, the Tyrrell team won the Constructors' Championship and three Drivers' Championships during the 1970s with Jackie Stewart. The team kept racing in F1 until 1998, when declining results led to Tyrrell selling the team to British American Tobacco (BAT). While BAT bought the Formula One entry, they set up the British American Racing (BAR) team in a new factory in Brackley. BAR competed for six years, with a high point of finishing second in the championship in 2004. Increasing restrictions on tobacco advertising resulted in Honda, BAR's engine partner, acquiring full control of the team at the end of 2005, and the team was renamed as Honda Racing F1. Brawn GP was formed on 6 March 2009 when it was confirmed that Ross Brawn, the former technical director for the Honda Racing F1, Ferrari, and Benetton teams, had bought the team from Honda for £1 in the wake of the Japanese marque's withdrawal from the sport in December 2008, marking Honda's return as Brawn GP.

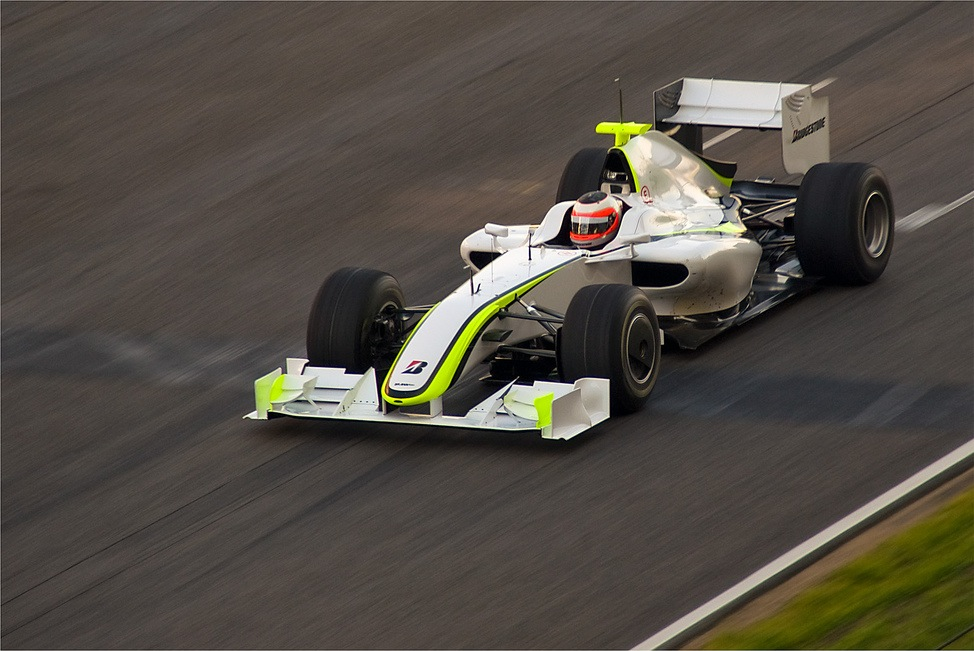
The Brawn BGP 001 during testing at Circuit de Catalunya

On 17 March 2009, the FIA officially agreed to the name change from Honda Racing F1 Team to Brawn GP. Although Brawn led the purchase of the assets and staff of the Honda team, the FIA considered Brawn GP to be an entirely new entry. FIA vice-president Keith Hayes agreed to waive the standard entry fee in recognition of the team's circumstances. When choosing a name for the team, a revival of the Tyrrell name was considered, as was Pure Racing. The name Pure Racing was blocked by engine supplier Mercedes, as the constructor name Pure Racing-Mercedes could have indicated that it was the works team of Mercedes, which in fact was McLaren at the time. With the loss of Honda's engines, Brawn stated that several manufacturers offered to supply the team but Mercedes-Benz engines were the ones that best fitted the car. Jenson Button and Rubens Barrichello, who had respectively been Honda's drivers since 2003 and 2006, comprised the driver line-up. It was also rumoured that the team would enter the 2009 season with backing from Bruno Senna, who would bring his personal sponsors to the team while former Honda test driver Lucas di Grassi was also in the frame for a drive with the team.

Honda had finished the 2008 Formula One season ninth out of eleven in the constructors' standings and that same year focused its development for the 2009 car. Although Honda were thought to be the first team to run a KERS in 2008, Brawn stated in an interview that, owing to the circumstances of the change in ownership, the team had not had the time to consider the system. On 20 March, it was confirmed that Brawn GP would be allocated the final pit-lane slot, with Force India moving up one slot. Bernie Ecclestone suggested that this was due to the takeover involving a name change, saying: "If ... it was called Honda. Whatever was due to Honda, they [Brawn GP] would have got." For this reason, Brawn GP were initially assigned numbers 20 and 21 after Force India were assigned Honda's old numbers of 18 and 19. This was changed at the request of Force India because their promotional material had already been printed with numbers 20 and 21. Brawn had no objection and were reassigned numbers 22 and 23, with 18 and 19 not assigned to anyone.

=== 2009 race season ===
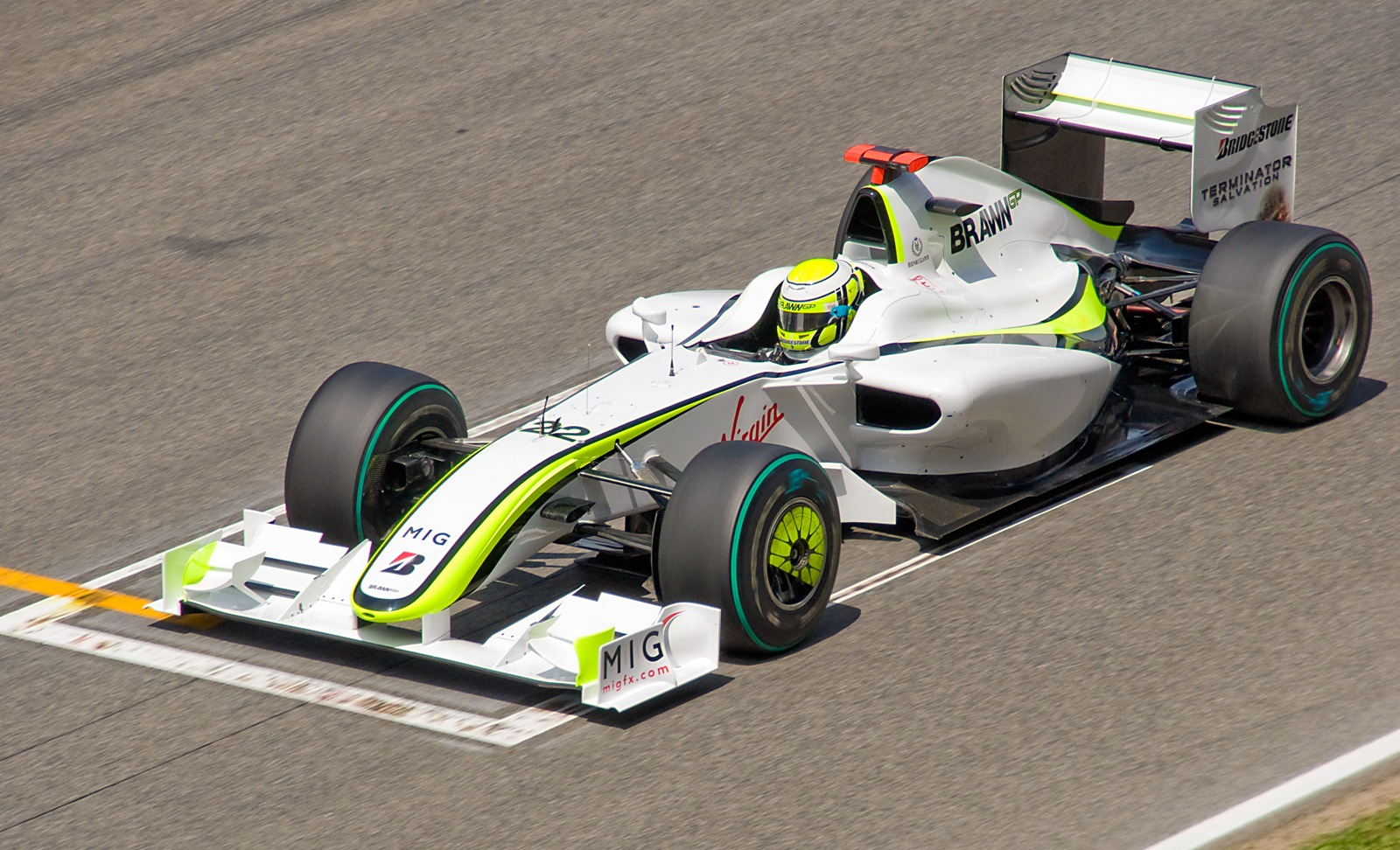
Jenson Button en route to his win at the Spanish Grand Prix

The team started off strongly on the Friday practice of the Australian Grand Prix, finishing in the top five. In qualifying at Australia, Jenson Button took pole, with teammate Rubens Barrichello coming second, followed by Red Bull's Sebastian Vettel. This was followed by a race win for Button, who led from start to finish, with Barrichello second, giving Brawn a 1–2 finish on their debut, which had not happened since Mercedes in the 1954 French Grand Prix. Button won the rain-shortened Malaysian Grand Prix from pole and picked up the fastest lap. With the win in Malaysia, Brawn GP became the only new constructor to win their first two races since Alfa Romeo won the first ever two World Championship Grands Prix at the 1950 British and Monaco Grands Prix. At the Chinese Grand Prix, Barrichello qualified in front of Button for the first time that season. In the rain, Button finished third with Barrichello fourth behind the Red Bulls of Vettel and Mark Webber.

Button won again at the Bahrain Grand Prix from fourth on the grid with Barrichello in fifth from sixth. Button ran most of the race in clean air and maintained the lead after the Toyotas pitted and fell down the order. This was the first time they were slower, with the fuel corrected qualifying times, in the season and was blamed on the lack of development on the car. At the Spanish Grand Prix, Brawn achieved their second 1–2 of the season, with Button leading home Barrichello again. Brawn's fourth win saw them overtake Honda on the all-time wins list.

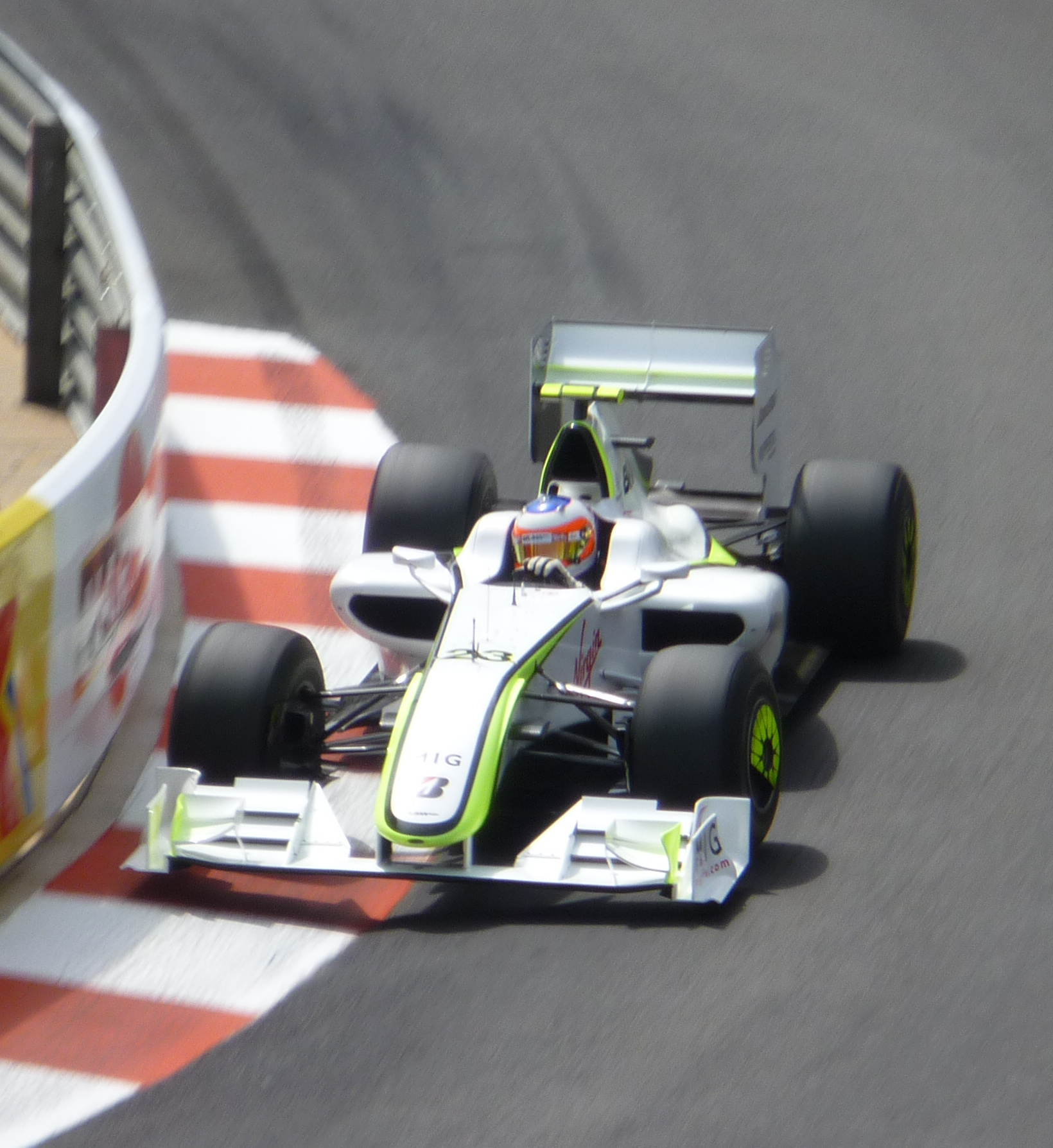
Rubens Barrichello in Monaco

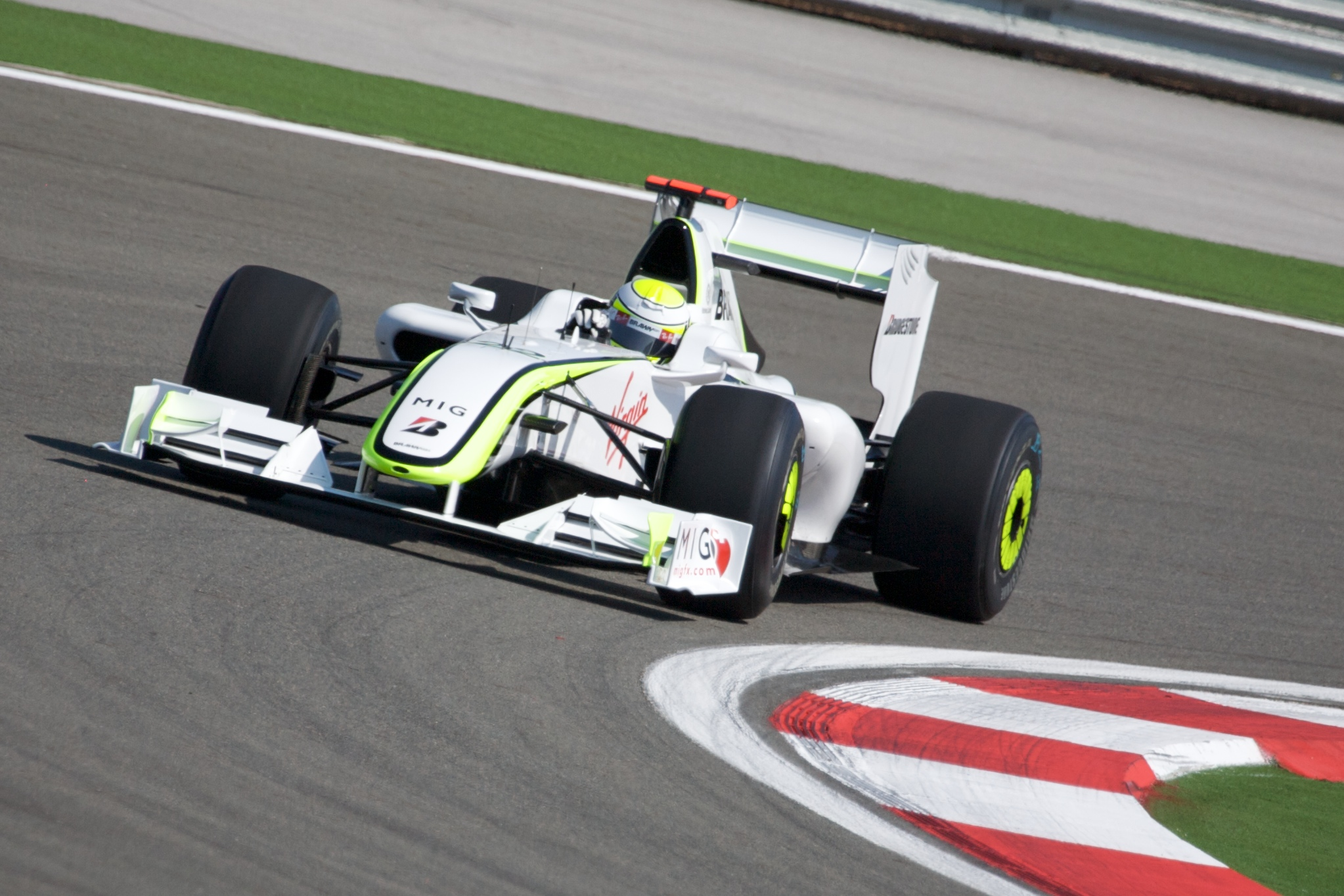
Button at the Turkish Grand Prix

At the Monaco Grand Prix, the same qualifying results as in Spain were achieved with Button on pole. Button led Barrichello, who had overtaken Kimi Räikkönen off the line, into the first corner with Button leading Barrichello, Räikkönen, and Felipe Massa for the majority of the race. Button took Brawn's third 1–2 and his first hat trick of wins. At the Turkish Grand Prix, the Brawns were beaten to pole by Vettel after struggling with pace throughout Friday and Saturday, for Button especially. At the start, Barrichello's anti-stall cut in and he fell to the back of the grid; Button meanwhile, after pointing the car at Vettel, got off cleanly and inherited the lead at turn 10 when Vettel ran wide. Button led the race calmly for the rest of the race, with his teammate having many incidents before giving Brawn their first retirement after losing seventh gear.

At the British Grand Prix, both drivers struggled in the team's home race. The car could not heat up the tyres enough and both drivers struggled with balance issues. Button had his worst qualifying of the season in sixth, with Barrichello achieving second. In the race, neither of the drivers shone and both had rather quiet races to third and sixth with Button having a late surge. At the German Grand Prix, the team suffered the same fate as in Britain as both drivers suffered with tyre temperatures. The team qualified light as to get onto the front row and qualified behind Webber in second and third, respectively. Despite leading in the first stint, Barrichello finished sixth after a faulty fuel rig ruined his race. Button ran in the low points after getting stuck behind Heikki Kovalainen and managed to overtake Barrichello to finish fifth after the team inverted their pit-stop laps to lessen his disadvantage to contenders Webber and Vettel, who finished first and second, respectively.

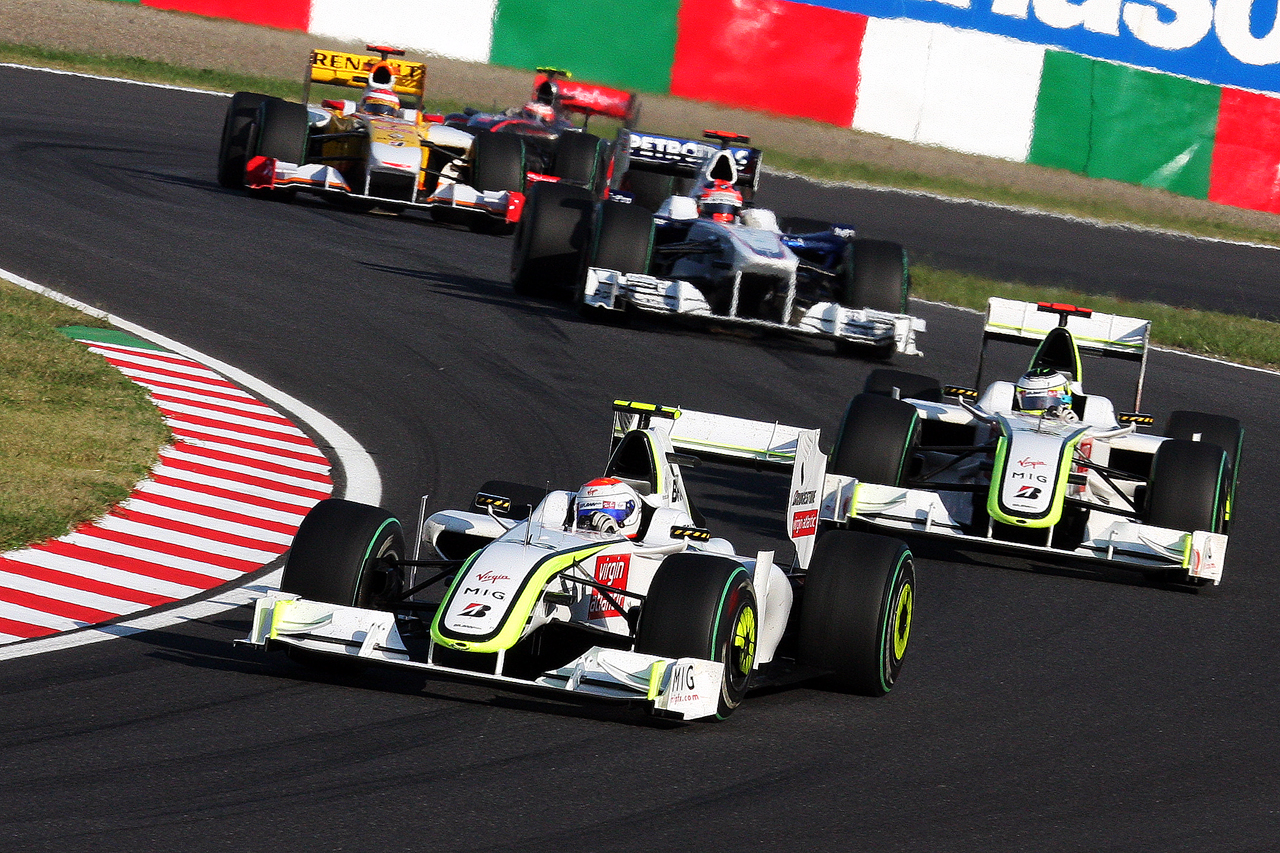
Barrichello and Button at the Japanese Grand Prix

At the Hungarian Grand Prix, Brawn suffered the same uncompetitiveness after experiencing their worst qualifying of the season, with Button in eighth and Barrichello in thirteenth. The reason for Barrichello's underperformance was caused by his rear suspension failing, which resulted in a spring falling off and subsequently striking Ferrari's Felipe Massa on the helmet, resulting in serious head injuries. Button too was affected by this as his car spent most of Q3 being checked to make sure the same components would not fail and ended up qualifying with much more fuel than planned. In the race, neither driver showed much pace until the temperature hit 40 °C, and Button was the fastest man on the track at that point. Button managed to repass Jarno Trulli through the final pit stops and finished seventh, with his teammate in tenth, closely behind Kazuki Nakajima and Trulli.

At the European Grand Prix, Barrichello won for the first time in five years, one of the longest gaps between Grand Prix victories in Formula One history. Barrichello started third on the grid, behind the rejuvenated McLaren-Mercedes cars of Lewis Hamilton and Kovalainen. While Barrichello thrived, Button started fifth on the grid and finished the race in seventh after the retirement of Vettel from fourth. At the Belgian Grand Prix, Button again had a dismal showing and was taken out by Romain Grosjean on the first lap. Barrichello started fourth but again had a clutch issue at the start; he managed to work his way up to seventh, his car's engine bursting into flames as he entered the pits. At the Italian Grand Prix, the Brawns were fuelled heavily and started fifth (Barrichello) and sixth (Button). Both Brawns managed to make it past the heavily fuelled Kovalainen in the opening laps, and both kept up their pace to complete their final one-two of the season, with Barrichello in first and Button in second. At the Singapore Grand Prix, both drivers suffered problems in qualifying, with Button failing to make it into the third session. Button and Barrichello eventually started eleventh and fifth on the grid, going on to finish fifth and sixth, respectively.

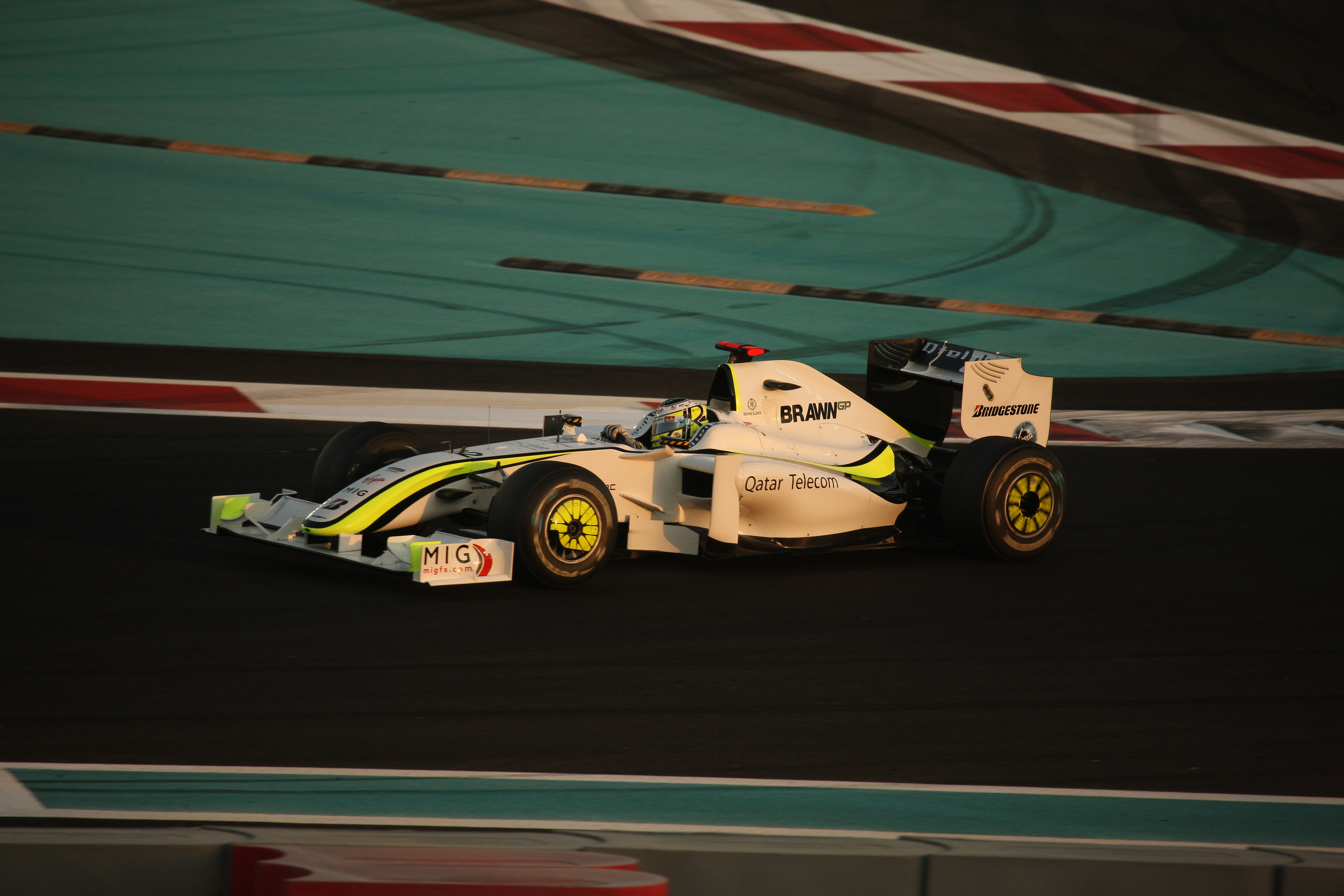
Button driving at the Abu Dhabi Grand Prix

At the Japanese Grand Prix, Brawn had the opportunity to clinch the 2009 Constructors' Championship. The drivers started sixth and tenth, and both of them had reasonably successful races, eventually finishing seventh and eighth. This left Brawn just half a point from winning the Constructors' Championship. After the race, the race stewards announced they were investigating Nico Rosberg for excessive speed under safety car conditions. A typical 25-second penalty would have moved both Brawn drivers one place up and the Constructors' Championship would have been won; it was announced later that Rosberg was in the clear and the race result would stand. At the Brazilian Grand Prix, Button clinched the Drivers' Championship by finishing in fifth place. With Barrichello finishing in eighth place, Brawn also won the Constructors' Championship. In Abu Dhabi Grand Prix, the final race of the season, they finished 3–4, with Button world champion ahead of Barrichello third in the championship. The team also won the 2010 Laureus World Sports Award for Team of the Year as a result of its success. The team had a race win success rate of 47.05% (8 wins in 17 races); by winning both titles in its only year of competition, the team is the first ever to achieve a 100% championship success rate.

=== Sale to Mercedes-Benz ===
On 16 November 2009, it was officially announced that Daimler AG, in partnership with Aabar Investments, had purchased a 75.1% stake in Brawn GP (Daimler AG: 45.1%; Aabar: 30%). Reports suggested the partnership paid £110 million for the 75.1%. In its single year of competition Brawn GP made a profit of £98.5 million, with its directors, including Ross Brawn and Nick Fry, sharing in £20 million worth of dividends, for a total of £150 million payout after its sale. The team would be rebranded as Mercedes GP for the 2010 season. The remaining 24.9% stake was Brawn's in partnership with Fry. The team used the Brawn GP base in Brackley for its operations and Brawn stayed on as team principal until the end of the 2013 season.

== BGP 001 ==
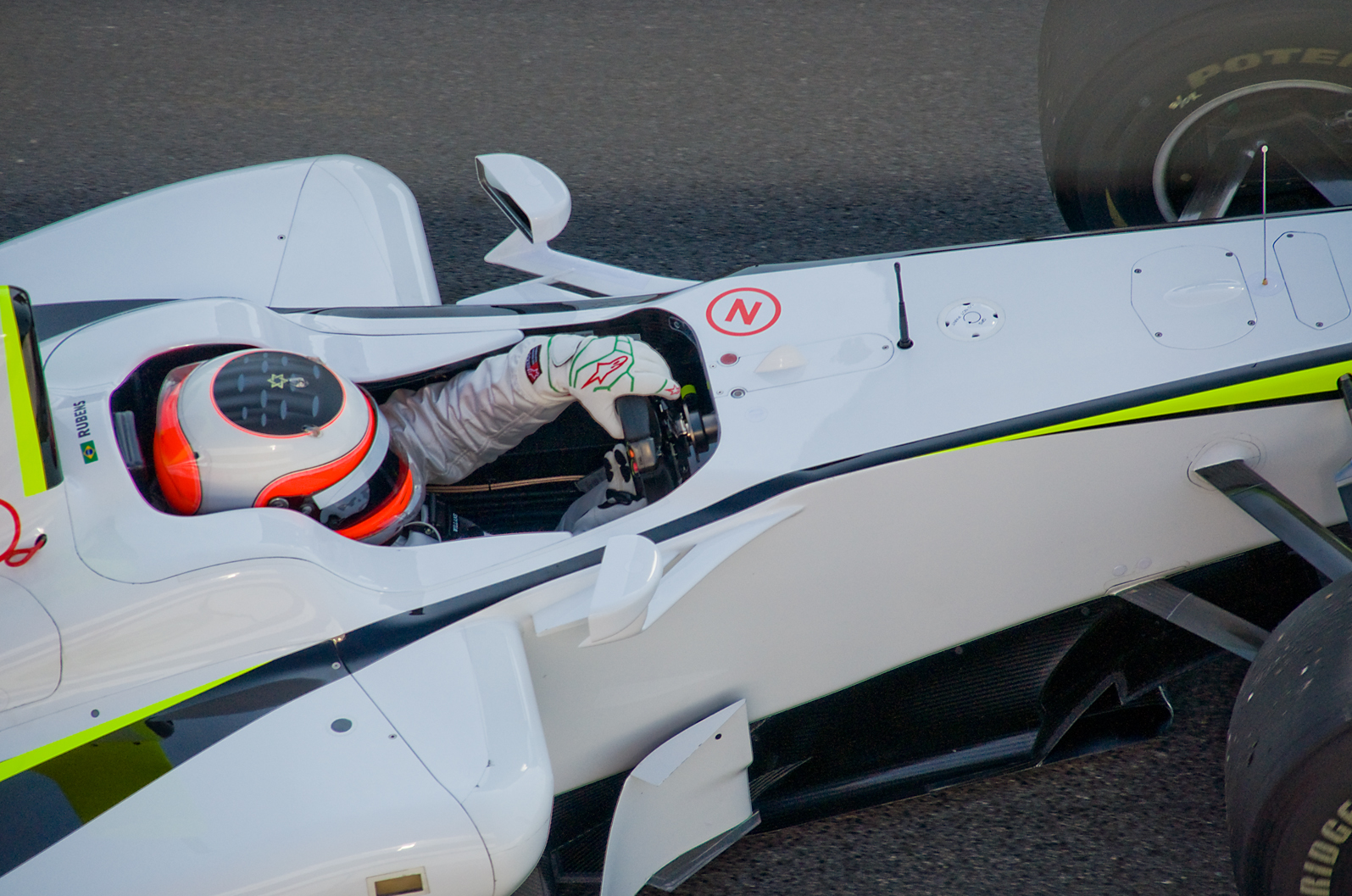
The cockpit of the BGP 001

The BGP 001 was originally designed with the intention of becoming the Honda RA109. In fact, owing to the poor performance of the Honda team in 2008, the team made a relatively early start in designing the 2009 car. Following Honda's withdrawal, development of the car continued in the hope that the team would be somehow rescued. Eventually, the car was appropriated by the newly formed Brawn GP team, and modified to accommodate a Mercedes-Benz engine in place of the expected Honda engine. According to team CEO Nick Fry, the team would not have gone on to win the championship with the Honda engines, as according to him the Mercedes engine accounted for 50 percent of the team's upturn in performance. Jenson Button performed its shakedown; the car featuring white, fluorescent chartreuse yellow, and black colours. The team gave the BGP 001 its first test at Circuit de Catalunya on 9 March 2009, topping the timesheets many times.

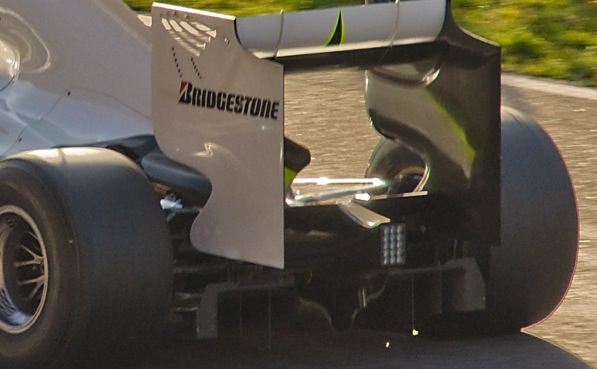
The rear of the BGP 001

With the testing moving to Circuito de Jerez, Brawn GP continued to set the pace, finishing the test leading two of the three tests. During an interview, Brawn said there was more speed to come after he explained: "The BGP 001 car is the result of 15 months of intensive development work and the team have been nothing less than fantastic in their commitment to producing two cars in time for the first race." At the first race, an official complaint was launched by four teams against the rear diffusers of the Williams FW31, Toyota TF109, and the Brawn BGP 001 on the grounds that they did not fall within the dimensions set out in the regulations; after analysing the cars, the race stewards reported that the cars were legal. This ruling was appealed and the appeal was heard after the second race of the season. Motorsport's governing body ruled that the car was legal.

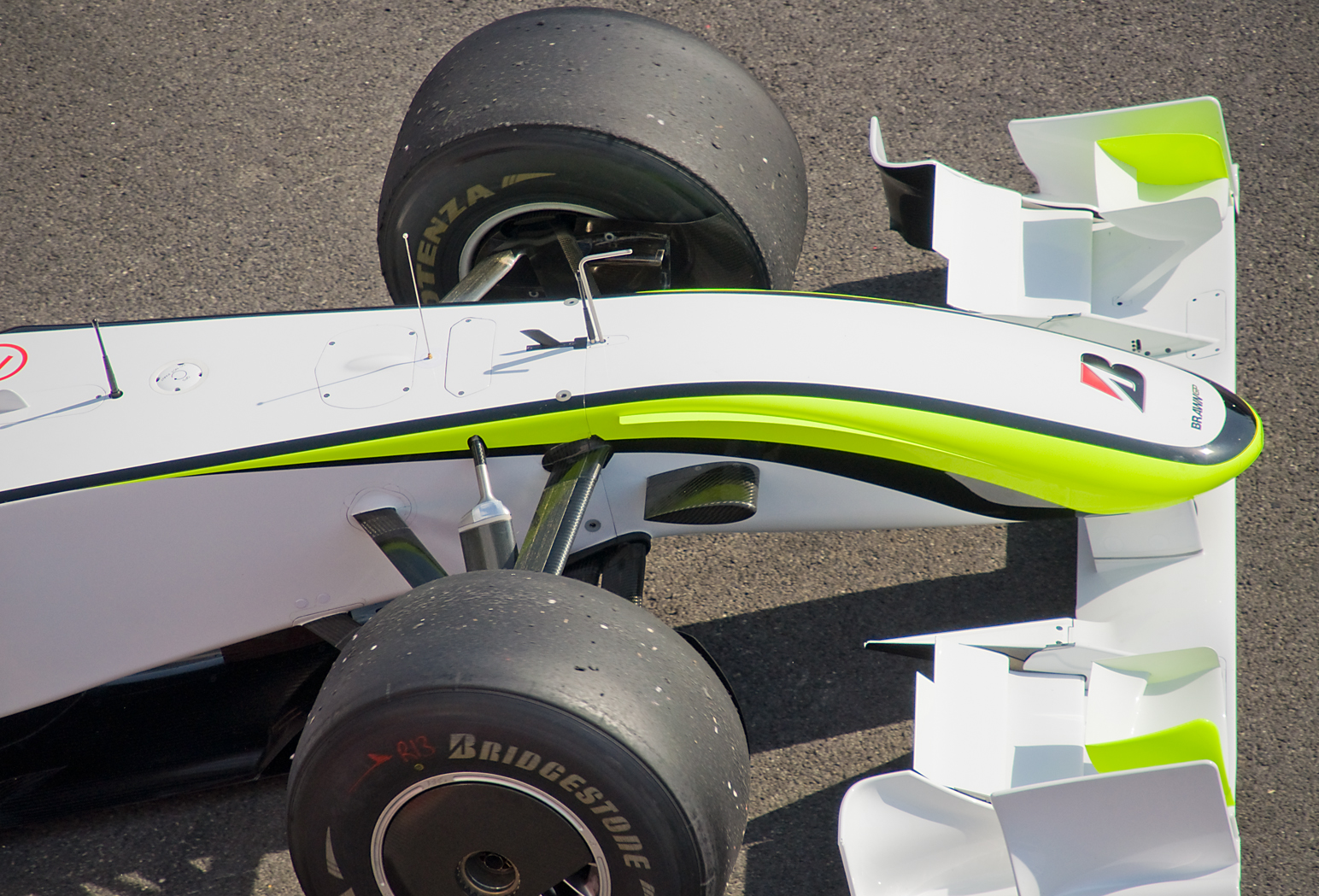
The front wing of the BGP 001

There was another complaint at Malaysia after which BMW Sauber joined the appeal after they were again deemed legal. After the appeal, the diffuser was deemed legal by the FIA. In Spain, the car received its first upgrades since Australia; these were mainly to do with the different cooling requirements of the Mercedes engine, and gave Brawn a 1–2 just as in Melbourne. Button used a single Brawn BGP 001 during the 2009 season, making the chassis designated "BGP 001-02" one of the most successful Formula One chassis of all time; Barrichello drove the chassis BGP 001-01 until it was damaged in a qualifying accident at the Singapore Grand Prix, after which he used BGP 001-03 for the rest of the season. Ross Brawn retained ownership of chassis BGP 001–02, which was subsequently restored to operational condition and to the championship winning livery (following a period of the car being displayed in silver Mercedes livery) and ran up the hill at the 2016 Goodwood Festival of Speed. Button took ownership of chassis BGP 001–01 as a condition of his contract with Brawn GP in the eventuality that he won the championship, after a protracted legal battle with Mercedes, the subsequent team owners. Chassis BGP 001-03 was retained by Mercedes following their acquisition of the team.

== Sponsorship ==
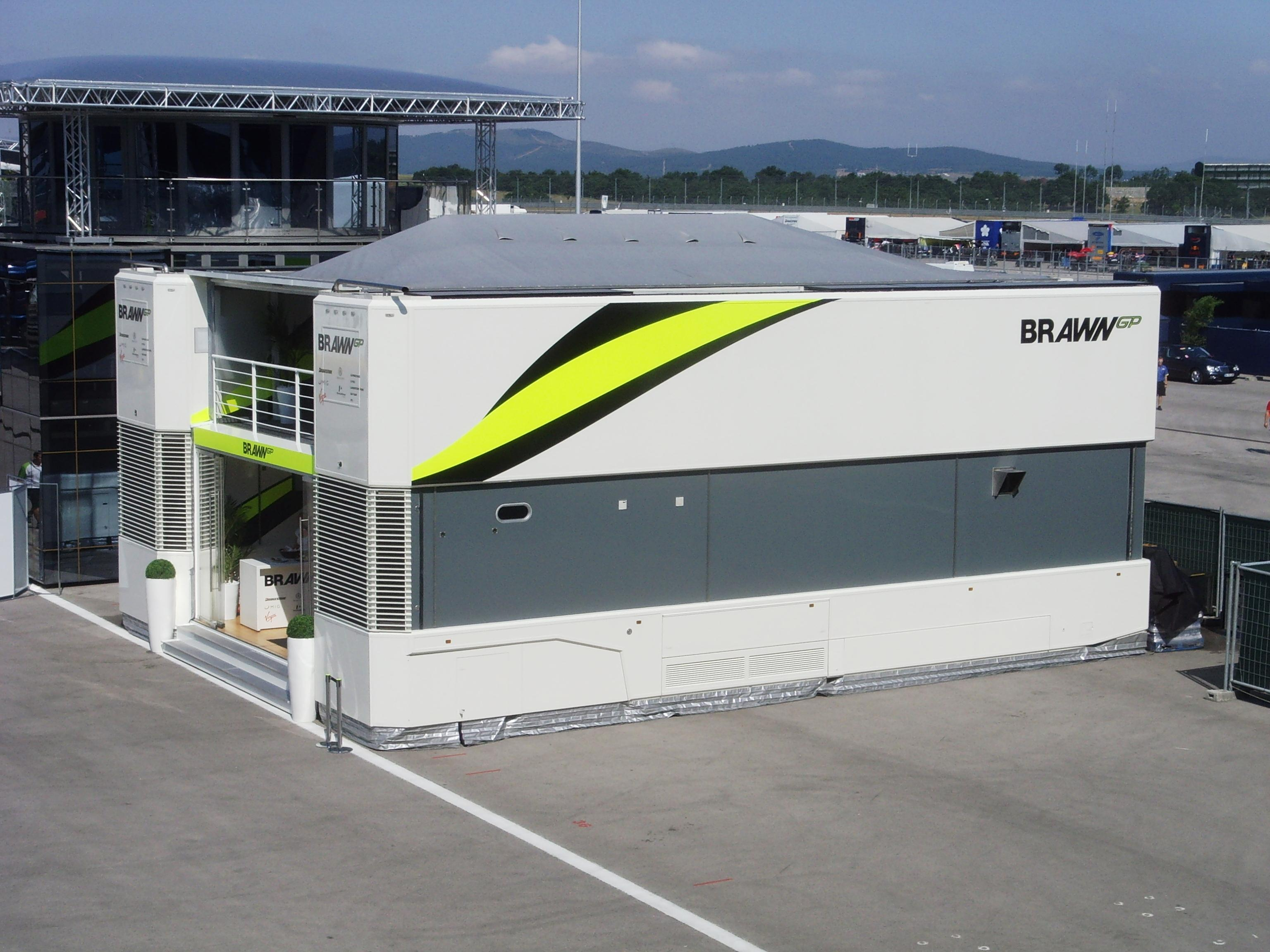
The Brawn GP motor home hosted the team and its sponsors at most races.

The sponsors that were still with the Honda team at the end of the 2008 season, including Bridgestone, stayed on as sponsors for the start of the 2009 season. On 26 March 2009, Brawn GP announced a partnership with British clothing manufacturer Henri Lloyd. Henri Lloyd, which became the "Official Supplier of Clothing and Footwear Technology" to Brawn GP under the deal, agreed to supply the team with clothing and footwear, with its brand appearing on the BGP 001. On 28 March 2009, mid-way through the Australian Grand Prix weekend, Richard Branson announced Virgin as a major sponsor for the team. On 17 April, Brawn announced an agreement with MIG Investments, which would sport its logo on the front of the car. It was also confirmed on 19 April that Ray-Ban, a sunglasses manufacturer, would carry on sponsoring the team – its logo appears on the drivers' helmets. At the Bahrain Grand Prix, the cars sported the Virgin Galactic logo instead of Virgin. The team re-signed Endless Advance, as well as NCE Corporation, and signed a new supplier deal with safety harness supplier Willans before the Spanish Grand Prix.

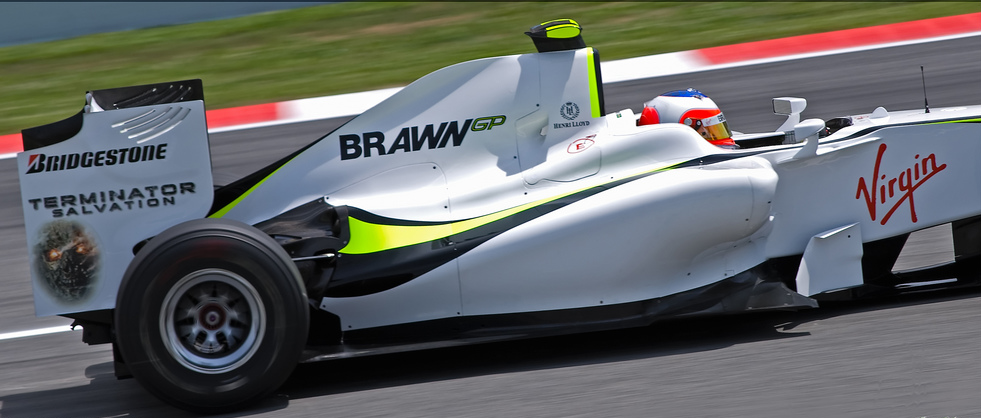
The Brawn BGP 001 with Terminator Salvation livery

Only for the Spanish Grand Prix, Sony Pictures joined the team with the cars featuring promotional imagery from the film Terminator Salvation. At the Monaco Grand Prix, Google co-founder Larry Page was rumoured to be in talks with Brawn to sponsor the team in 2010. Although a guest of McLaren-Mercedes, Page is believed to want the Google name to appear on a race-winning team. They secured a one-race sponsorship with Riedel Communications (based in Wuppertal). The team took up sponsorship from Graham-London before the British Grand Prix, with its logo being shown on the BGP 001s' wing mirrors, including an agreement with Menna Casting. In addition, Monster Energy added its logo to Button's helmet from Silverstone onwards. Branson indicated that Virgin was unlikely to continue its deal next season, citing cost as a hurdle.

For the European Grand Prix, the cars sported the Virgin Active logo. For the Italian Grand Prix, the BGP 001 sported the Italian zipper company Raccagni logo and name on the side wings in front of the side-pods, as well as the Virgin Active logo once again. For the Singapore Grand Prix, Brawn GP secured a sponsorship deal with Canon, and the cars also sported the Virgin Media logo. For the Japanese Grand Prix, Brawn GP secured a single race sponsorship deal with Angfa Co. Ltd., maker of the medical shampoo Scalp-D, which has proved very popular in Japan since its launch in 2005. The Virgin Atlantic logo also appeared. For the Brazilian Grand Prix, the event in which it won the Constructors' Championship, Brawn GP had deals with Banco do Brasil and Petrópolis brewery to display its colours and beer brand Itaipava and TNT energy drink on both cars. It also had a one-race partnership with Spanish insurance company Mapfre, while the Virgin Galactic logo reappeared. For the Abu Dhabi Grand Prix, the cars sported the Virgin Galactic logo once more, as the team had a deal with Qatar Telecom.

== Legacy ==
Described as "Formula One's last great fairy-tale story", a four-part documentary starring Keanu Reeves and key Brawn GP personnel was released on 15 November 2023 on Disney+ and Hulu, telling the story of the team's success.

== Complete Formula One results ==
(key)

Year	Chassis	Engine	Tyres	Drivers	1	2	3	4	5	6	7	8	9	10	11	12	13	14	15	16	17	Points	WCC
2009	BGP 001	Mercedes FO 108W 2.4 V8	B		AUS	MAL	CHN	BHR	ESP	MON	TUR	GBR	GER	HUN	EUR	BEL	ITA	SIN	JPN	BRA	ABU	172	1st
2009	BGP 001	Mercedes FO 108W 2.4 V8	B	(United Kingdom) Jenson Button	1^{P}	1^{P}^{F}^{‡}	3	1	1^{P}	1^{P}	1^{F}	6	5	7	7	Ret	2	5	8	5	3	172	1st
2009	BGP 001	Mercedes FO 108W 2.4 V8	B	(Brazil) Rubens Barrichello	2	5^{‡}	4^{F}	5	2^{F}	2	Ret	3	6	10	1	7	1	6	7	8^{P}	4	172	1st

^{‡} Half points awarded as less than 75% of race distance was completed

Achievements
Preceded by Ferrari	Formula One Constructors' Champion; 2009	Succeeded by Red Bull Racing
Awards
Preceded by China Olympic Team	Laureus World Team of the Year; 2010	Succeeded by Spain national football team
