= Adam Parr =

British businessman

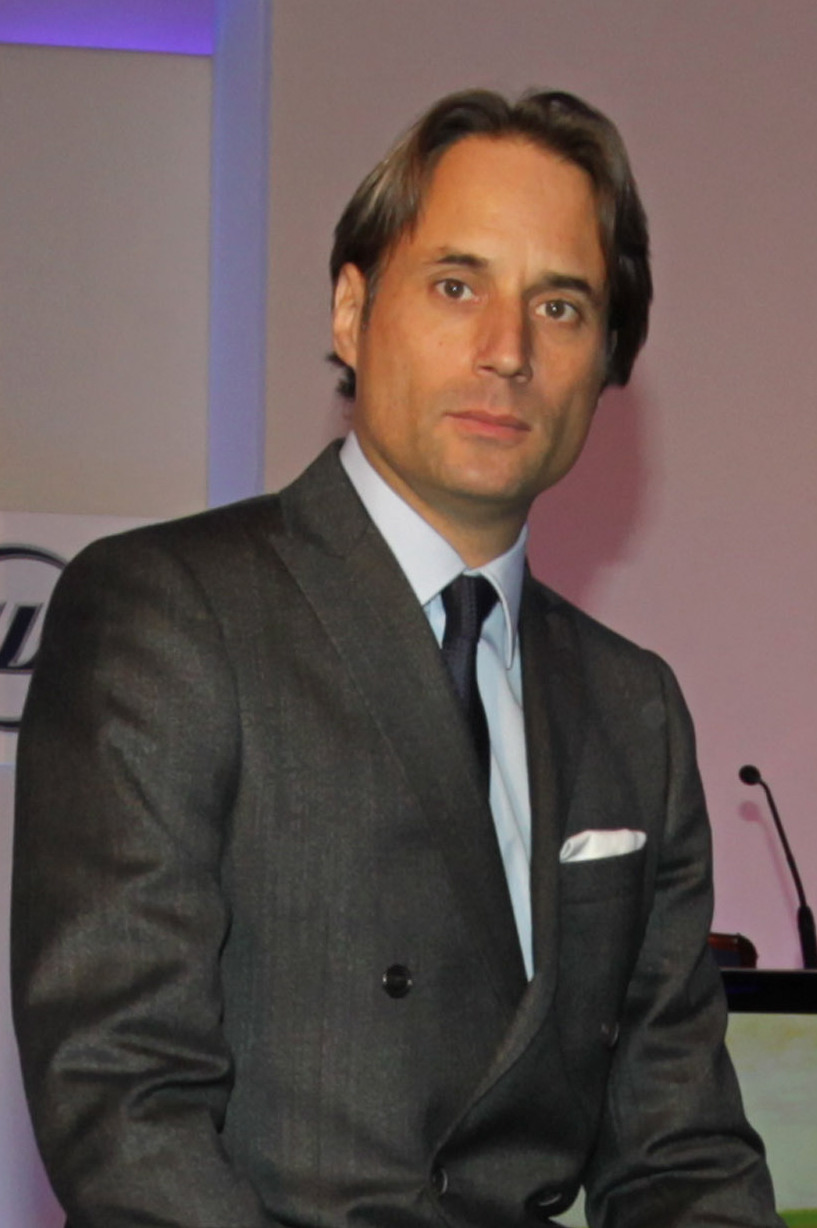
- Parr in 2011
- Born: 26 May 1965 (age 61)

Adam Parr (born 26 May 1965) is a British businessman known for his work in various fields including Formula 1 and investment to NGOs. He is the former CEO and chairman of Williams Grand Prix Holdings PLC, from November 2006 until 30 March 2012. Parr began his career working for BZW and moved to Rio Tinto before studying and practising public law. He later returned to Rio Tinto as assistant to the Chief Executive and chairman before being appointed CEO of Williams F1 in 2006.

Since leaving Williams in 2012, Parr has completed a PhD in eighteenth-century history and literature at University College London; and been involved in business and not-for-profit activities.

== Early life and education ==
Parr was born in London as Adam Stephen de Voghelaere Parr in 1965. He attended Jesus College, Cambridge, graduating in 1987.

=== Williams F1 ===
In November 2006 Parr was appointed chief executive officer of Williams F1, replacing departing CEO Chris Chapple. Parr was chairman of Williams Grand Prix Engineering Limited from July 2010 to March 2012, responsible for the day-to-day running of the team, whilst Frank Williams remained Team Principal and majority shareholder of the company. Parr was known during his tenure for his green innovation – bringing hybrid technology to the fore of Williams.

== Publications ==
In 2013, Parr released a graphic memoir, entitled The Art of War: Five Years in Formula One, detailing his time as CEO of Williams F1.

In 2016, Simon and Schuster published Total Competition - Lessons in Strategy from Formula One by Parr and co-author Ross Brawn.

In 2019, Brill published The Mandate of Heaven - Strategy, Revolution, and the First European Translation of Sunzi’s Art of War (1772).

In 2023, the Oxford Open Climate Change journal published The Paradox Test in Climate Litigation, a paper in which Parr proposes a new test of legality based on a scientific assessment of threats to the human habitat.

Parr's research papers are available at the John Porter Centre for Diplomacy at Hertford College, the University of Oxford, where he is a research associate. He is also a business fellow at the Smith School for Enterprise & the Environment at Oxford.

== Not for profit ==
Parr was named chief executive of Sported in April 2013. The foundation was set up in 2008 by Sir Keith Mills, donating £10 million to inspire disadvantaged young people. Following the London 2012 Summer Olympics, Sported became "the UK's leading sports foundation dedicated to securing the legacy of London 2012" He stood down as chief executive of Sported at the end of 2013.

Adam Parr also briefly worked with the Walk Free Foundation, which aims to eliminate modern slavery by 2020.

From 2013 to 2020, Parr was a trustee of the River Learning Trust, a multi-academy trust based in Oxford whose schools include The Cherwell School.

In 2020, Parr founded Homeland Conservation, a charitable trust dedicated to accelerating action on climate change. The charity was originally called The Downforce Trust, a reference to the aerodynamic effect of downforce sought after by Formula One engineers, that provides speed and grip to F1 cars.

Homeland Conservation created and funds SRI-2030, an initiative to promote the System of Rice Intensification, one of the top climate solutions identified by Project Drawdown.

== Enterprise ==
Parr chairs the tech startup Oxford Semantic Technologies in 2017 which he co-founded alongside Professors Ian Horrocks, Bernardo Cuenca Grau, and Boris Motik of the University of Oxford.

Parr has served on several boards since leaving Formula One. These include Cosworth, a high performance engineering firm based in Northampton where he was a director for seven years, stepping down in 2019.
