= Ross Brawn =

British automotive engineer (born 1954)

Ross Brawn OBE
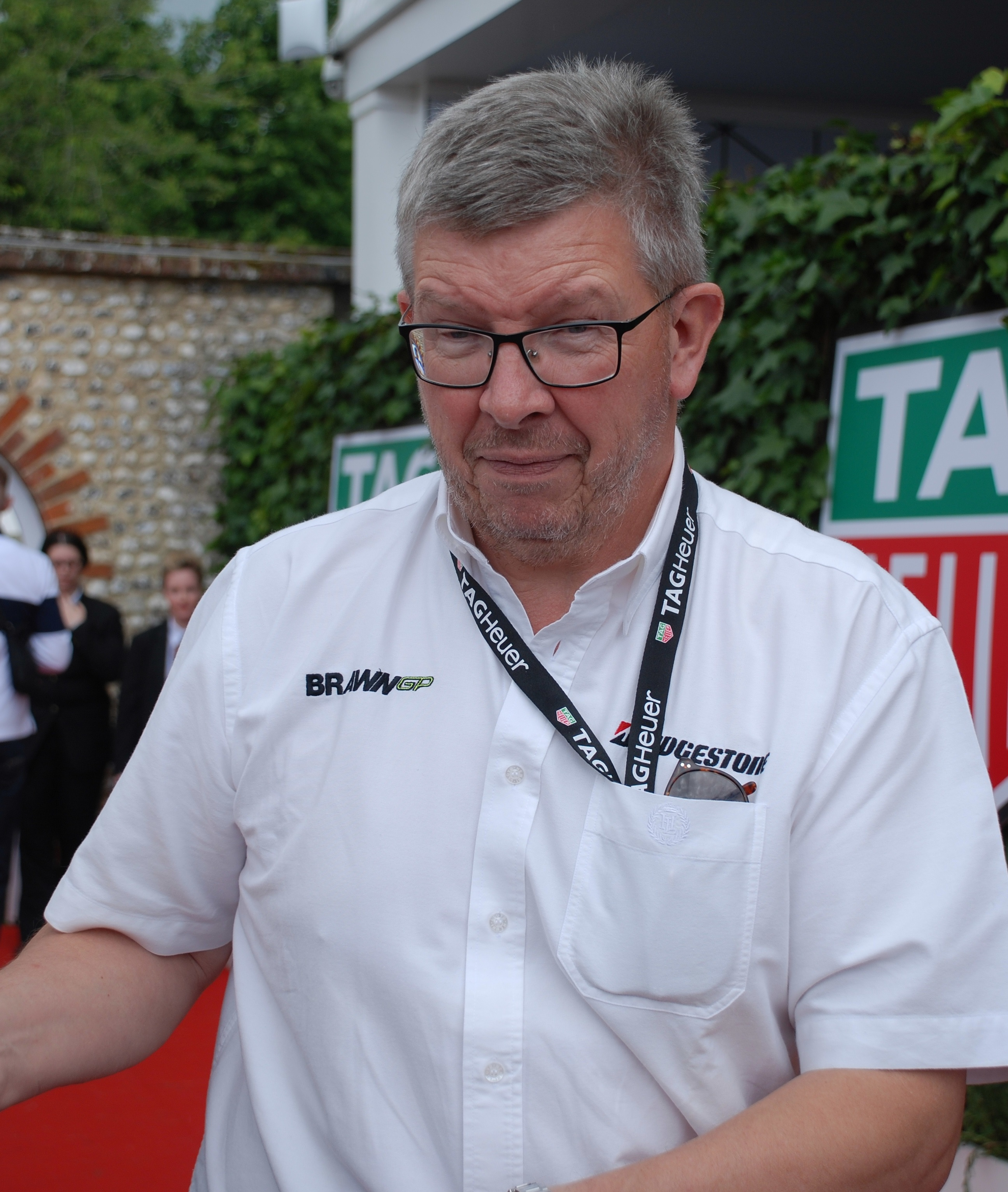
- Brawn at the 2016 Goodwood Festival of Speed in the clothes of his own team Brawn GP
- Born: Ross James Brawn; 23 November 1954 (age 71); Ashton-under-Lyne, Lancashire, England
- Occupations: Formula One managing director, motor sports and technical director (2017–2022); Formula One team technical director/team principal (1991–2006, 2008–2013)
- Employer: Formula One Group
- Spouse: Jean Brawn

Ross James Brawn (born 23 November 1954) is a British Formula One managing director, motor sports and technical director. He is a former motorsport engineer and Formula One team principal, and has worked for a number of Formula One teams. Teams with Brawn in an essential role have won eight constructors' championships and eight drivers' championships in total. Serving as the technical director of the championship-winning Benetton and Ferrari teams, he earned fame as the "mastermind" behind Michael Schumacher's seven world championship titles. He took a sabbatical in 2007 and returned to F1 for the 2008 season as team principal of Honda.

Brawn acquired the Honda team in early 2009 to form the Brawn GP team, which won the Formula One Constructors' and Drivers' Championships in that year. Mercedes bought into the team in November 2009, making Brawn team principal and co-owner with Nick Fry. In 2011, Brawn and Fry sold the remaining shares to Mercedes-Benz, with Brawn remaining as team principal. In November 2013, it was announced that Brawn would step down, and leadership would be handed over to Paddy Lowe and Toto Wolff. Following speculation linking him with other teams, Brawn announced his retirement from Formula One in February 2014.

== Early life and family ==
Brawn was born in Ashton-under-Lyne, Lancashire, England. He became interested in engineering during his early years, often visiting Belle Vue Stadium to watch various forms of motor racing. He moved south aged 11 as his father took a job near Reading, Berkshire, and he subsequently attended Reading School in the town. In 1971, he was taken on as a mechanical craft apprentice by the United Kingdom Atomic Energy Authority at its Atomic Energy Research Establishment in Harwell, Oxfordshire, where he qualified as an instrument mechanic. He went on to start an HNC in Mechanical Engineering, still funded by Harwell. Living in Reading, he found an advertisement for Frank Williams Grand Prix, which were based in Reading at that time; he was interviewed by Patrick Head. Williams were looking for a milling machinist which was one of the skills he learnt at Harwell.

Brawn lives in Stoke Row, near Henley-on-Thames. In his spare time he enjoys gardening, fishing and listening to music. In 2006, Brawn received an honorary degree of Doctor of Engineering (DEng) from Brunel University for his services to motorsport. On 18 November 2011, Brawn received a second honorary doctorate from Heriot-Watt University.

== Career ==
His career in motorsport began in 1976 when he joined March Engineering in the town of Bicester as a milling machine operator. Soon afterwards, he joined their Formula 3 racing team as a mechanic. Brawn was hired by Frank Williams in 1978 as a machinist for the newly formed Williams team. He quickly moved up through the ranks, working in the R&D department with Frank Dernie and as an aerodynamicist in the team's wind tunnel.

Brawn joined the Haas Lola team in 1985 and was part of Neil Oatley's design team at FORCE that produced both the Lola THL1 and THL2 cars used by the team. With the 4 cylinder Hart engine in the THL1 and the new Ford V6 turbo powering the THL2, results were scarce against teams like McLaren and Williams with their TAG-Porsche and Honda turbo engines. This was despite the cars generally being regarded by most in the Formula One paddock as being the best handling cars on the grid, as well as having 1980 World Champion Alan Jones and former factory Ferrari and Renault driver Patrick Tambay as the drivers. When the team left Formula One at the end of the 1986 season, Brawn moved to Arrows. There, he designed the Megatron powered Arrows A10 and its update, the A10B for the 1987 and 1988 seasons respectively and the Ford V8 powered Arrows A11 used in 1989. Later in 1989, Brawn moved to the Jaguar Sportscar racing division, and was lead designer on the Jaguar XJR-14 which won the 1991 World Sportscar Championship.

=== Benetton (1991–1996) ===
Later in 1991 Brawn returned to Formula One as technical director of the Benetton team, helping it win consecutive World Drivers' Championships in 1994 and 1995 with Michael Schumacher, and to take the World Constructors' Championship in 1995. Despite the car being designed by Rory Byrne, Brawn was credited by much of the specialist press with being an important part of these championships, particularly in terms of devising race strategy. Brawn also persuaded Frank Dernie to join to help with car development and improve the team organisation.

=== Ferrari (1997–2006) ===
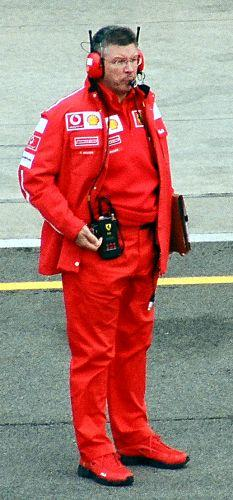
Brawn in the pit lane at the 2003 United States Grand Prix

Brawn followed Schumacher to Ferrari in late 1996, at the end of Schumacher's first year with the team. He was renowned for his race strategies as the team began to challenge for the championship from 1997, despite the superiority of the Williams cars that year and the McLarens from 1998 onwards. After these rebuilding years, as Ferrari technical director, he helped them regain glory when the team won the Constructors' Championship in 1999, the first of six consecutive titles.

The Brawn-guided Scuderia also powered Schumacher to five consecutive drivers' titles, from 2000 to 2004. Brawn's contributions to this unprecedented string of titles has led many to label him as a vital member of the Ferrari "dream team" along with Schumacher, team principal Jean Todt, and chief designer Rory Byrne. In 2005, Ferrari never quite found form, and had to relinquish the title to Renault, and Schumacher passed the crown to Fernando Alonso. In 2006, Ferrari had a poor start to the season but clearly had the fastest car by the end of that season.

On 26 October 2006, Ferrari announced that Brawn was to leave the team. It was believed that he would take a one-year sabbatical to allow other members of the Ferrari technical departments to advance within the team.

=== Honda (2008) ===
Towards the end of 2007, it was reported that Brawn was to join the big-spending Red Bull outfit as part of a package intended to attract double world champion Fernando Alonso. On 12 November 2007, it was announced that Brawn was to become the new team principal of Honda. He started working with the British-based team on 26 November 2007. With the withdrawal of Honda from Formula One announced in late 2008, Brawn was effectively out of the sport unless a buyer could quickly be found. This was unfortunate for Brawn as he believed that the team had a "race-winning car" for 2009.

=== Brawn GP (2009) ===
On 5 March 2009, a 100% buy-out of Honda was completed, with Brawn taking a controlling 54% stake. They announced entry to the 2009 Formula One World Championship under the new name Brawn GP. Minority shareholders were CEO Nick Fry (31%), former Honda finance chief Nigel Kerr (8%), former Honda head of Human Resources John Marsden (3%), former Honda legal counsel Caroline McGrory (3%), and former Honda director Gordon Blair (1%). Many aspects of Honda were retained under the new ownership, including the experienced driver line-up of Rubens Barrichello and Jenson Button. Brawn GP chose to source their engines for the 2009 season from Mercedes-Benz.

In the first Grand Prix of 2009 in Australia, Button qualified in pole position with Barrichello in second place; they went on to finish in those positions. Of the 17 Grand Prix races of the 2009 season, Button won six and Barrichello won two, while the team finished in both first and second places in four races and in podium positions in eleven races. The Brawn team was given a financial boost on the eve of the Australian Grand Prix when Virgin boss Richard Branson announced he was going to become a team sponsor. The team then got a second sponsor on board, the Swiss brokers MIG Investments. Brawn GP won the 2009 Constructors' Championship and Button won the Drivers' Championship at the Brazilian Grand Prix. Brawn was appointed Officer of the Order of the British Empire (OBE) in the 2010 New Year Honours for services to motorsport.

=== Mercedes (2010–2013) ===
In November 2009, Brawn GP was bought out by Daimler AG, the parent company of Mercedes-Benz. Brawn, as majority shareholder, stood to do very well financially from the deal and remained as team principal. He and Fry kept a 24.9% share in the new team, which was then sold to Daimler AG in early 2011. In December 2009, seven-time world champion Michael Schumacher confirmed that the main reason he decided to come out of retirement and drive for Mercedes GP was because of Brawn. It was at Benetton and at Ferrari where Brawn masterminded Schumacher's seven world titles. The start of the 2010 season was rather slow, and in the first three races Schumacher managed only sixth in Bahrain, tenth in Australia, and retired in Malaysia because of a lost wheel nut, whilst Schumacher's teammate and fellow-countryman Nico Rosberg had a bit more success with the car, finishing fifth in Bahrain and in Australia, and scoring the first podium for Mercedes Grand Prix with a third place in Malaysia.

The team won their first race on 15 April 2012, when Rosberg won the Chinese Grand Prix. The team continued its good run from China with Schumacher qualifying fastest at Monaco, and Rosberg finishing on the podium. Towards the end of the season, the team had some lacklustre results. In the Japanese Grand Prix, Schumacher announced his retirement from Formula One, and Mercedes announced that the 2008 world champion and McLaren driver Lewis Hamilton was to join their line-up, pairing with Rosberg for the 2013 season.

2013 started much as 2012 had ended for Mercedes, as the pre-season indicated that the car was unreliable, with Rosberg suffering from damage to his exhaust on the first day of testing in Jerez, and Hamilton suffering a brake failure on the second day. As testing continued Mercedes showed signs of pace, particularly in the final Barcelona test. At the first race in Melbourne, both Rosberg and Hamilton qualified well inside the top 10, with Hamilton finishing fifth, whilst Rosberg suffered more problems with his car, eventually retiring. In the second race of the season, Mercedes finished third (Hamilton) and fourth (Rosberg), amid a controversial Malaysian Grand Prix. Brawn spoke to both drivers over team radio asking them to hold position for fear of high degrading Pirelli tyres and a lack of fuel on board both cars. The third race at China established Mercedes' pace as title contenders when Hamilton took Mercedes' second pole position in two years at China whilst Rosberg qualified fourth. Hamilton went on to finish in third place but Rosberg again had to retire with an anti-rollbar failure.

Rosberg took pole at the next three Grands Prix and brought Mercedes their first win of the season in Monaco; however, the victory was overshadowed by controversy after Mercedes used a then current car when undertaking a tyre test at the invitation of Pirelli shortly before the Grand Prix. The team were reprimanded by the FIA and banned from a subsequent young drivers' test but did not lose any championship points. The car continued to perform much better in qualifying than in the race for the rest of the season. Hamilton took four more pole positions and Mercedes won two more races, in Britain (Rosberg) and Hungary (Hamilton). Following multiple tyre failures at the British Grand Prix, Pirelli reverted to the 2012 components after the summer break, which saw Sebastian Vettel and Red Bull win all the remaining races and the championships. Mercedes finished second in the constructors' championship, while Hamilton and Rosberg finished fourth and fifth in the drivers' standings.

On 29 October 2013, the BBC reported that Brawn would leave Mercedes at the end of the 2013 season, following disagreement about his role in the team. On 28 November 2013, it was reported that he would leave the team at the end of the year.

=== 2014 to 2016 ===
On 1 February 2014, Brawn announced his retirement from Formula One, ending speculation of a possible position at the Woking-based McLaren team. The FIA announced in October 2014 that Brawn would be a member of a 10-strong panel to investigate Jules Bianchi's crash at the 2014 Japanese Grand Prix and that the panel would report to the World Motor Sport Council in December.

In an interview with The Daily Telegraph in October 2016, Brawn indicated that he was ready to return to Formula 1, although in a strategic rather than a team role. His book on strategy in Formula 1, Total Competition, was released a week later.

=== Formula One Management (2017–2022) ===
On 23 January 2017, it was announced that Ross Brawn was appointed to the newly created role of managing director, Motor Sports, and technical director for the Formula One Group. Following the 2022 season, rumours emerged he may return to Ferrari as team principal. On 28 November 2022, he confirmed he was retiring from Formula One.

== Personal life ==
=== Charity work ===
In 2010, Brawn, a member of the RNLI, set up the Brawn Lifeboat Challenge to fund a new lifeboat for the River Thames in London. The venture raised £360,000 in 8 months and the new E-class lifeboat Brawn Challenge was launched in September 2012. In 2014, he became a patron of Hope for Tomorrow, a charity which provides NHS trusts with mobile cancer care units so that they can provide cancer treatment in local communities.

=== Speeding offence ===
Brawn avoided a driving ban after he admitted speeding at over 100 mph (160 km/h) on a dual carriageway. He was speeding in his Mercedes-Benz E320 Saloon on the 70 mph (112 km/h) limited A30 at Sourton near Okehampton, Devon on 30 May 2009. Brawn paid a fine of £700, costs of £75, and had his licence endorsed with six points.

=== Authorship ===
- Brawn, Ross & Parr, Adam. Total Competition: Lessons in strategy from Formula One. Simon & Schuster (2016). ISBN 978-1471162350
