= Riccardo Musconi =

Italian engineer

- Citizenship: Italian
- Occupation: Engineer
- Employer: Mercedes AMG Petronas Motorsport
- Known for: Formula One engineer
- Title: Head of Virtual World Simulation

Riccardo Musconi is an Italian Formula One engineer. He is currently the head of virtual world simulation at the Mercedes AMG Petronas F1 Team Formula One team. He previously served as race engineer to Valtteri Bottas and George Russell and performance engineer to Rubens Barrichello, Nico Rosberg and Lewis Hamilton.

== Career ==
Musconi was born in Imola, Italy. He studied at the University of Bologna before undertaking further studies at the University of Modena and Reggio Emilia. He began his motorsport career with Dallara in 2003 as a vehicle dynamicist, where he worked on chassis development, simulation, and performance analysis projects across a range of single-seater programmes until the end of 2005. In 2006 he joined Honda Racing F1 as an assistant race engineer, working with Rubens Barrichello. He remained with the Brackley-based team through its transition into Brawn GP in 2009, contributing to Barrichello's final two Grand Prix victories and the development of the championship-winning Brawn BGP001 during the team's successful Constructors’ Championship campaign.

Following the team's transformation into Mercedes-AMG F1 Team, Musconi moved into a performance engineering role. He worked with Nico Rosberg from 2010 to 2014 and then with Lewis Hamilton from 2015 to 2018, contributing to car setup optimisation, data-driven performance analysis, and race execution during a period that included three Drivers’ Championships for Hamilton. In 2019, Musconi was appointed race engineer to Valtteri Bottas, a role he held through the 2021 season. He subsequently served as race engineer to George Russell in 2022 before moving into a broader leadership position as Head of Trackside Performance in 2023. In 2024 he became Head of Virtual World Simulation, overseeing simulation-driven development, driver-in-the-loop systems, and correlation methodologies supporting the team's car development and performance programmes.
