= 2009 British Grand Prix =

Coordinates: 52°04′43″N 1°01′01″W

Race 8 of 17 in the 2009 Formula One World Championship
← Previous race	Next race →
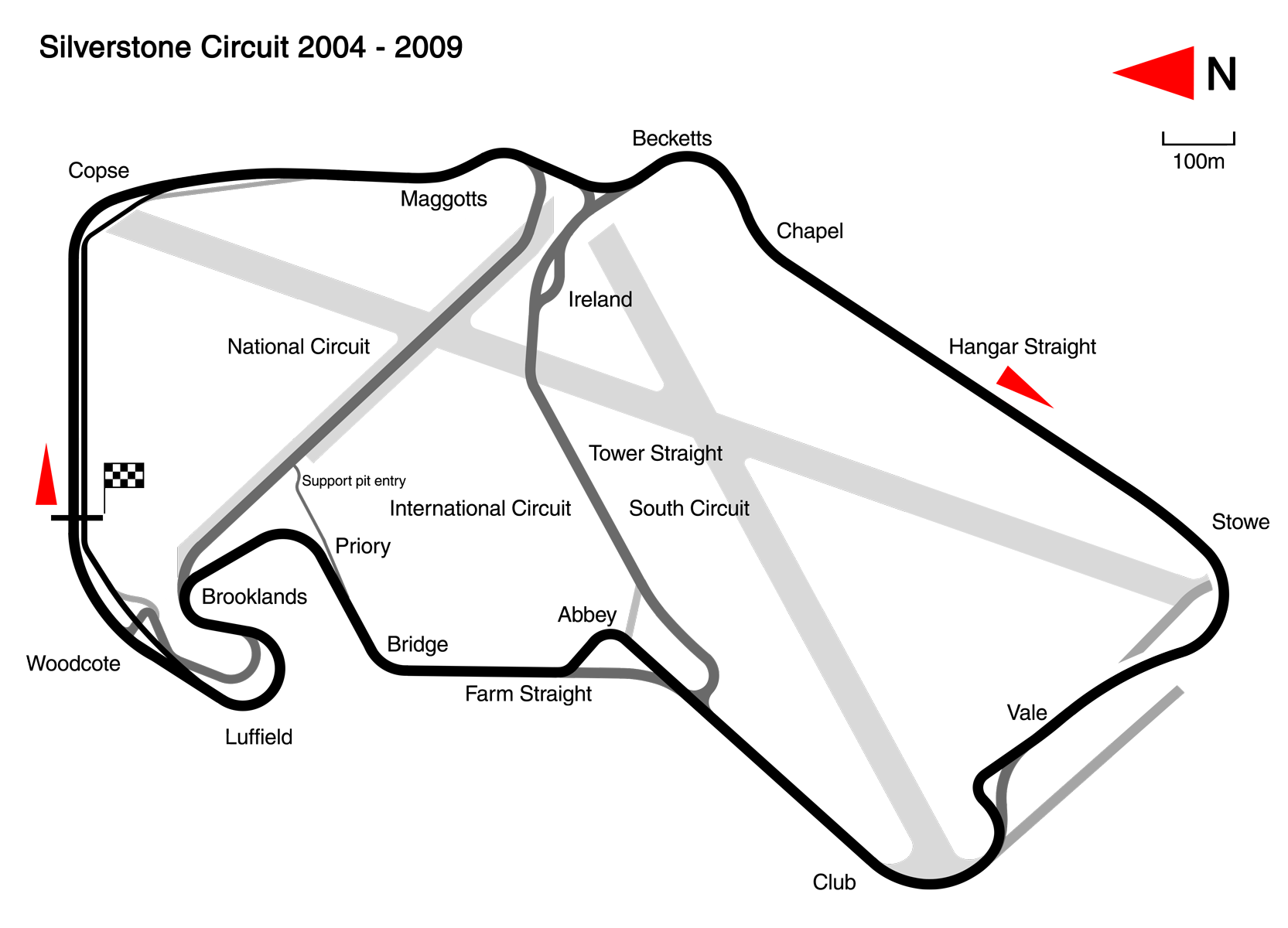
- Silverstone Circuit in 2009

Race details
- Date: 21 June 2009
- Official name: 2009 Formula 1 Santander British Grand Prix
- Location: Silverstone Circuit, Northamptonshire and Buckinghamshire, England
- Course: Permanent racing facility
- Course length: 5.141 km (3.194 miles)
- Distance: 60 laps, 308.355 km (191.603 miles)
- Weather: Dry, overcast
- Attendance: 128,000

Pole position
Driver	(Germany) Sebastian Vettel	Red Bull-Renault
- Time: 1:19.509

Fastest lap
Driver	(Germany) Sebastian Vettel	Red Bull-Renault
- Time: 1:20.735 on lap 16

Podium
First	(Germany) Sebastian Vettel	Red Bull-Renault
Second	(Australia) Mark Webber	Red Bull-Renault
Third	(Brazil) Rubens Barrichello	Brawn-Mercedes

The 2009 British Grand Prix (formally the 2009 Formula 1 Santander British Grand Prix) was a Formula One motor race held at the Silverstone Circuit in Northamptonshire, United Kingdom, on 21 June 2009. The 60-lap race was the eighth round of the 2009 Formula One season. It was scheduled to be the last British Grand Prix to be held at Silverstone, before the event moved to Donington Park for the 2010 season. However, due to Donington being unable to raise the required funds the event returned to Silverstone again in 2010, on a new layout. The race was won by Sebastian Vettel, who started on pole, with championship leader Jenson Button finishing in sixth position.

== Report ==
=== Background ===
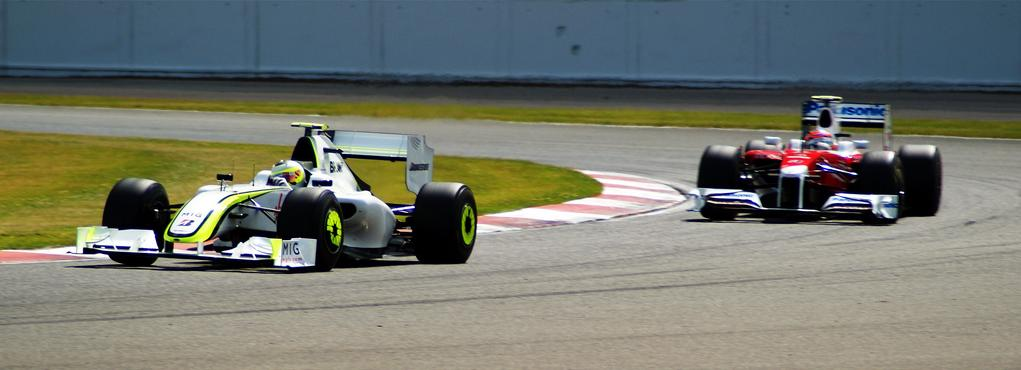
Rubens Barrichello (left) entered the race 26 points behind his teammate, Jenson Button, in the championship standings.

Home driver Jenson Button led the Drivers' Championship by 26 points from Brawn teammate Rubens Barrichello. Barrichello was 8 points clear of Red Bull's Sebastian Vettel, who lay 1.5 points ahead of his teammate, Mark Webber.

Brawn GP led the Constructors' Championship by 39.5 points from Red Bull Racing and were a further 24 points ahead of Japanese manufacturer Toyota.

Home favourite and reigning World Champion, Lewis Hamilton, had won the previous year's event for McLaren. As well as Hamilton, the British Grand Prix has a history of native success. Down the years these include wins for David Coulthard, Johnny Herbert, Damon Hill, Nigel Mansell, John Watson, James Hunt, Jackie Stewart, Jim Clark and Stirling Moss. Britain was to be represented this year by Hamilton and Jenson Button.

Due to the continuing political dispute between the Formula 1 Teams Association (FOTA), the FIA and Formula 1 Management (FOM), there was talk that the teams against the proposed 2010 season budget cap would not compete in the 2010 season.

Other former British GP winners in the field were Ferrari's Kimi Räikkönen, Renault's Fernando Alonso and Brawn GP driver Rubens Barrichello.

=== Practice and qualifying ===
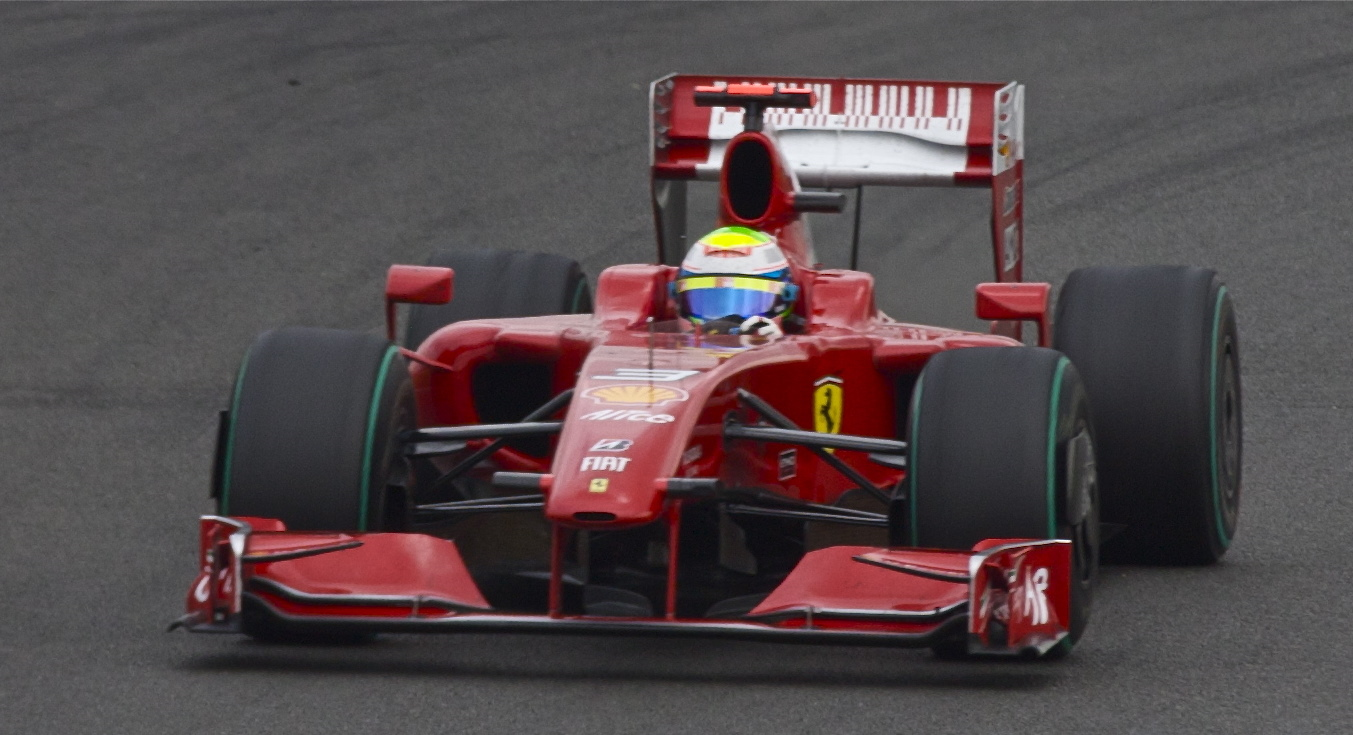
Felipe Massa qualified in eleventh position.

Sebastian Vettel was fastest in both the first and second practice sessions, with Mark Webber coming second in both. The final session saw Nico Rosberg top the time charts.

Qualifying began in some of the coolest conditions experienced all year, with an air temperature of just 16 °C (61 °F). The session was mostly dominated by the Red Bull drivers, until a late flying lap by Kazuki Nakajima saw him fastest by a tenth of a second. The session ended prematurely in the final minute when Adrian Sutil crashed heavily at Abbey, forcing reigning World Champion Lewis Hamilton to abort his final lap and leaving him nineteenth with Giancarlo Fisichella, Sébastien Bourdais, Sutil and Sébastien Buemi also eliminated. Sutil's accident was later found to have been a result of brake failure.

The second session did not begin until the remains of Sutil's car were removed from the circuit, with track conditions remaining constant and Red Bull continuing their pace, with Mark Webber remaining unchallenged for most of the session with teammate Sebastian Vettel only out-pacing him on his final run. Championship leader Jenson Button only narrowly missed elimination, setting the eight-fastest time at the end of the session when he had previously been sitting eleventh. Felipe Massa, Robert Kubica, Heikki Kovalainen, Nelson Piquet Jr. and Nick Heidfeld were all eliminated.

The third and final session saw most of the cars switching to the softer option tyre. Sebastian Vettel took pole from Rubens Barrichello, with Webber third. Button qualified sixth – his worst of the season – after Nakajima found some of his first-session pace to steal fifth place out from under him, resulting in his career-best qualifying position. When the weights of each car was published post-qualifying, it emerged that Vettel was 9 kg heavier than the Brawn of Barrichello and 7 kg heavier than teammate Webber. After qualifying, it was announced that BMW Sauber would be abandoning their KERS program for good.

=== Race ===
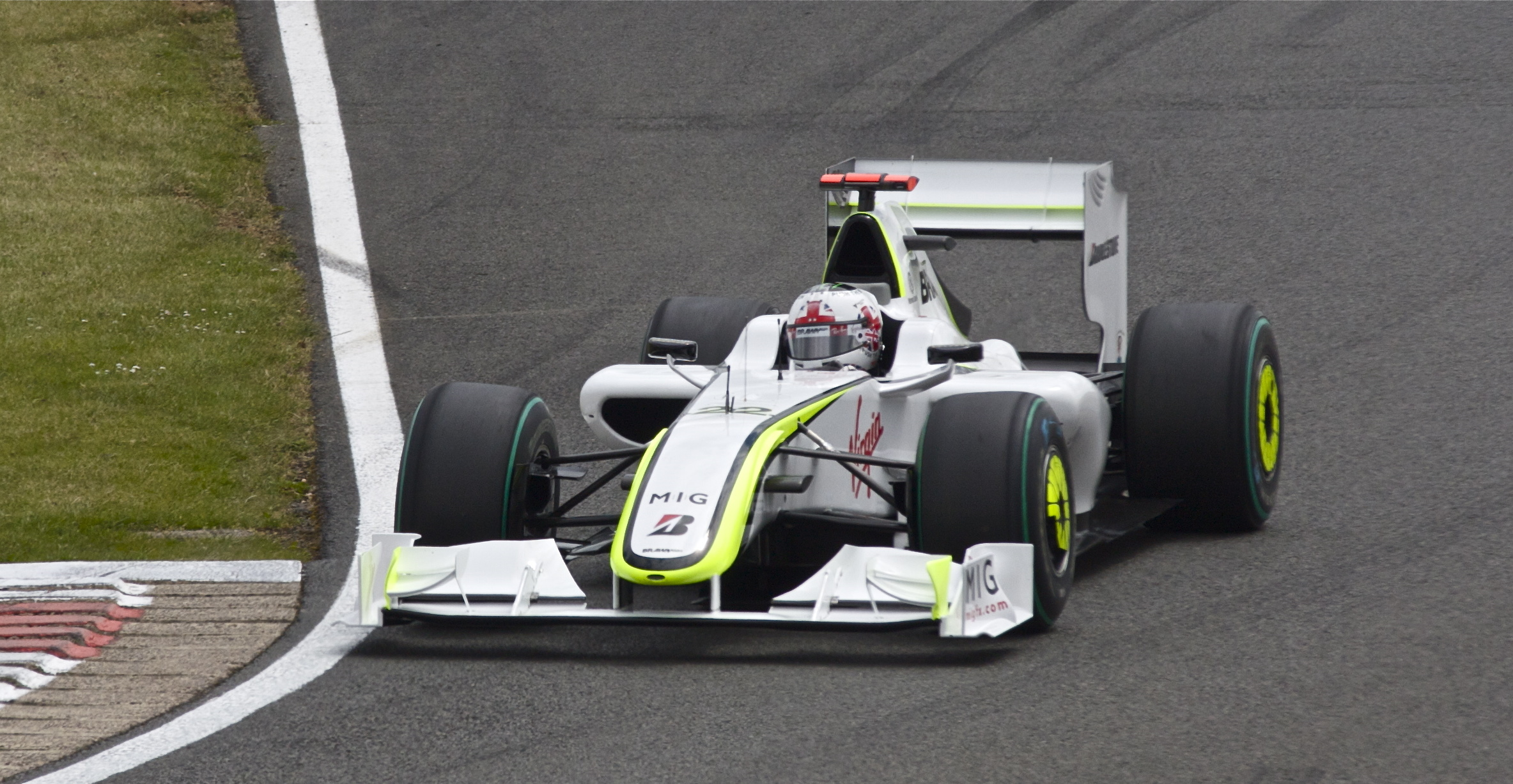
Jenson Button struggled with tyre temperatures throughout the race.

Vettel and Red Bull dominated the Grand Prix, with the young German driving away from the field from pole position, often pulling away from Barrichello at the rate of one second per lap.

It was a good day for the Red Bull drivers from the moment the lights went out, with championship rival Button dropping down to ninth position at the end of the first lap after a poor start. Fellow home driver Hamilton was having more success, albeit from 19th on the grid, gaining four positions in the first two laps. The mixed-up race order was perhaps reflective of the season as a whole, with the only World Champions in the field – Raikkonen, Alonso and Hamilton – at one point battling for 13th, 14th and 15th positions.

At the front of the race while Vettel was setting fastest laps, teammate Mark Webber was unable to pass Rubens Barrichello for second position until the Brazilian pitted on lap 20. Webber pitted a lap later but produced a good enough in-lap to emerge from the pits ahead of Barrichello. Nico Rosberg also benefited from the pit stop phase, emerging in fourth position, ahead of Felipe Massa.

Hamilton's eventful race at the back of the field continued, running off track on several occasions. He was able to pass teammate Heikki Kovalainen who had just emerged from the pits on lap 34. The following lap, Sebastian Bourdais attempted a similar manoeuvre at the Abbey chicane, however the Toro Rosso driver was less successful, colliding with the Finn and causing both cars to retire.

At the second round of pit-stops, Button was able to take advantage of a long middle stint to move ahead of Raikkonen and Trulli and up to sixth position, behind Massa, who had in-turn leap-frogged Rosberg for fourth. Button was on the faster tyre compound and pressured both cars until the finish, but was unable to pass Rosberg despite being just 0.3 seconds behind the German at the start of the last lap. Rosberg was himself just 0.8 seconds behind Massa.

As Vettel took the chequered flag, he was 15.1 seconds ahead of teammate Webber, who was a further 25.9 seconds ahead of Barrichello. Jarno Trulli finished in 7th ahead of Raikkonen, who had to endure late pressure from Trulli's teammate Timo Glock. Hamilton finished a lowly 16th.

=== Post-race ===
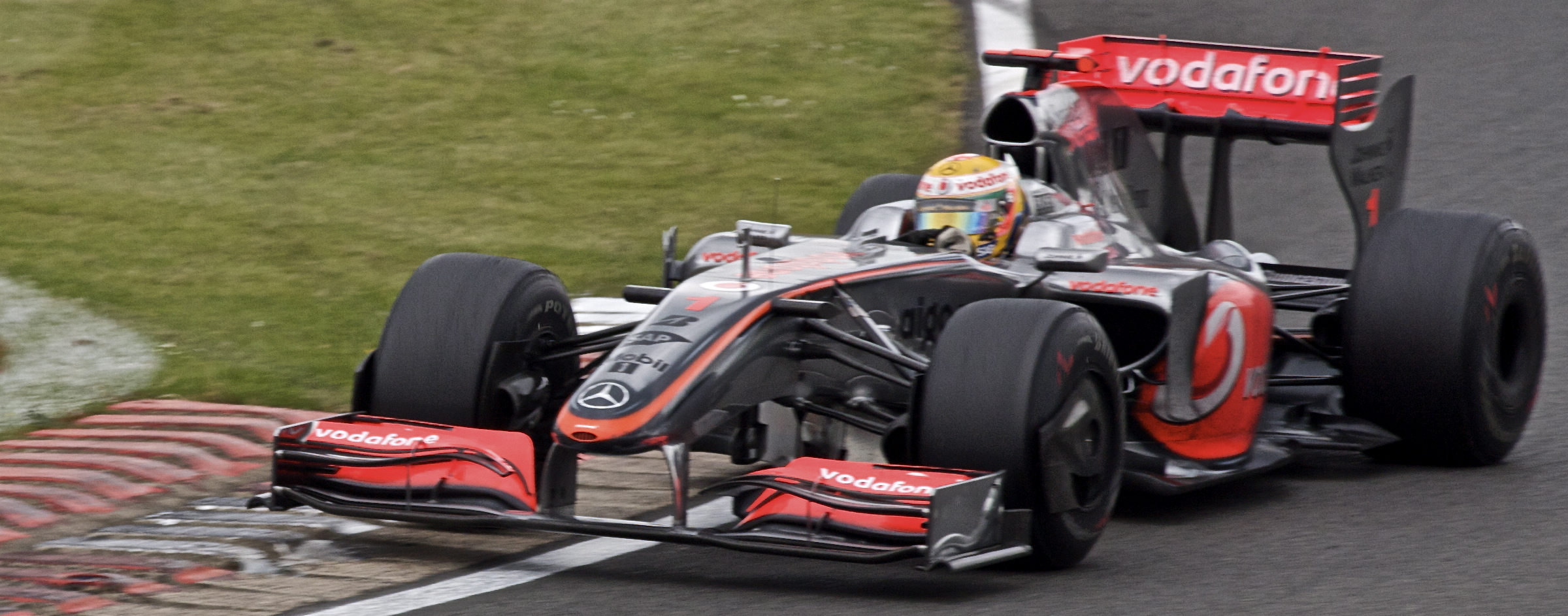
Lewis Hamilton performed some doughnuts for the crowd after the race.

The combination of the fast sweeping circuit suiting the updated Red Bull RB5 and cold conditions hampering the Brawn produced what was a disappointing result for pace-setting Brawn. Button's championship lead was reduced to a still substantial 23 points over Barrichello, who was now just 2 points ahead of Vettel. Webber was a further 3.5 points behind, while Brawn's Constructors' Championship lead was also cut.

Red Bull's Christian Horner declared his team could mount a serious title challenge following the successful showing of their updated car, claiming it should be quick on the remaining circuits. Vettel declared his car to be "fantastic" while Mark Webber praised the team but admitted a mistake in qualifying cost him any chance of winning. The race also saw Vettel claim his first "hat trick", with pole, fastest lap and the win. Button dismissed talk of Red Bull now having a sizeable advantage, saying Brawn looked weaker than they were because of the cool conditions.

There were contrasting emotions for 2008 title contenders Felipe Massa and Lewis Hamilton, Massa describing his race from 11th to 4th as good as winning the race while Hamilton said he was pushing his hardest despite finishing 16th.

Away from the track action, the talk of the paddock was the threat of a breakaway series, with FIA President Max Mosley confident of a solution to the dispute. Commercial rights holder Bernie Ecclestone admitted for the first time the British Grand Prix would be returning to Silverstone if Donington Park was unable to host the 2010 event.

== Classification ==
Cars that used KERS are marked with "‡"

=== Qualifying ===
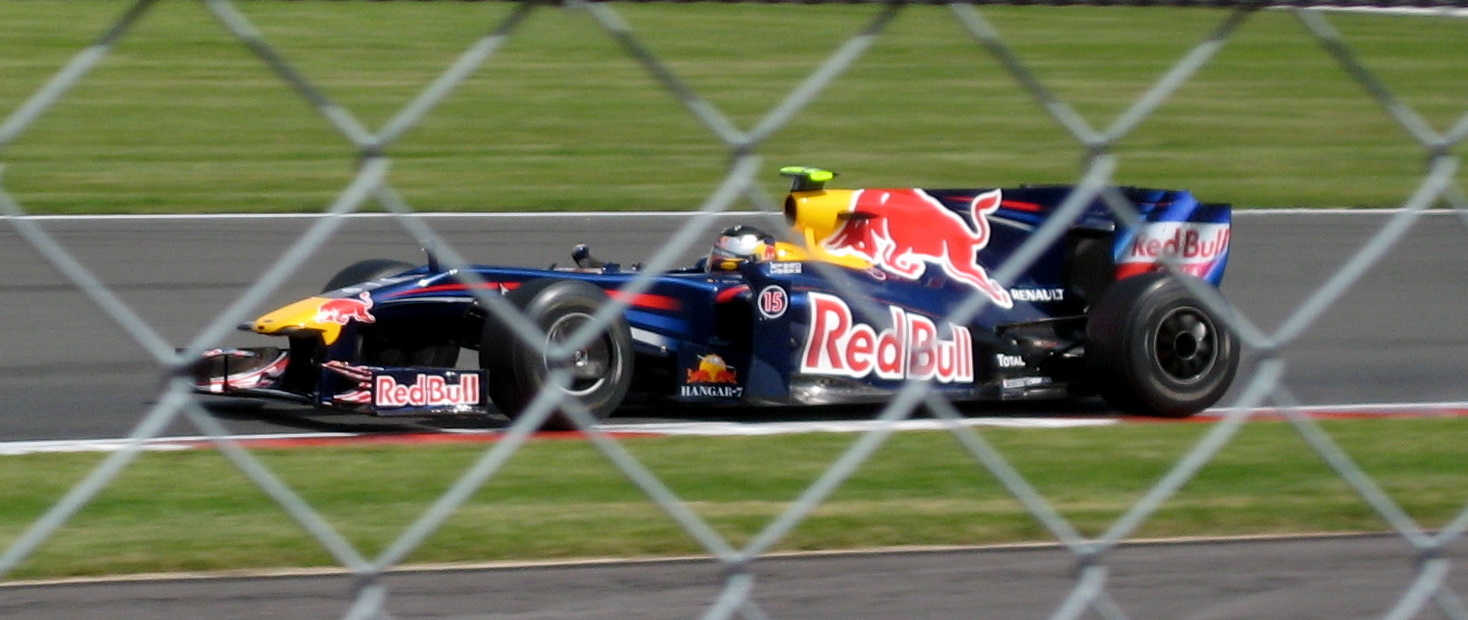
Sebastian Vettel won the race from pole position.

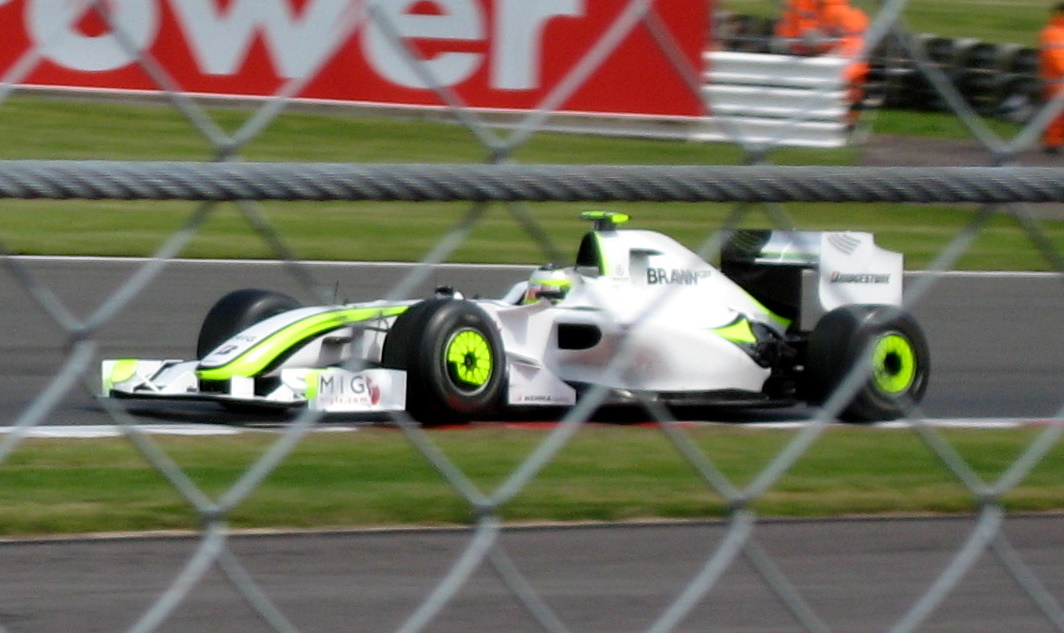
Rubens Barrichello completed the podium with third, finishing ahead of Brawn GP teammate Jenson Button for the first time in 2009.

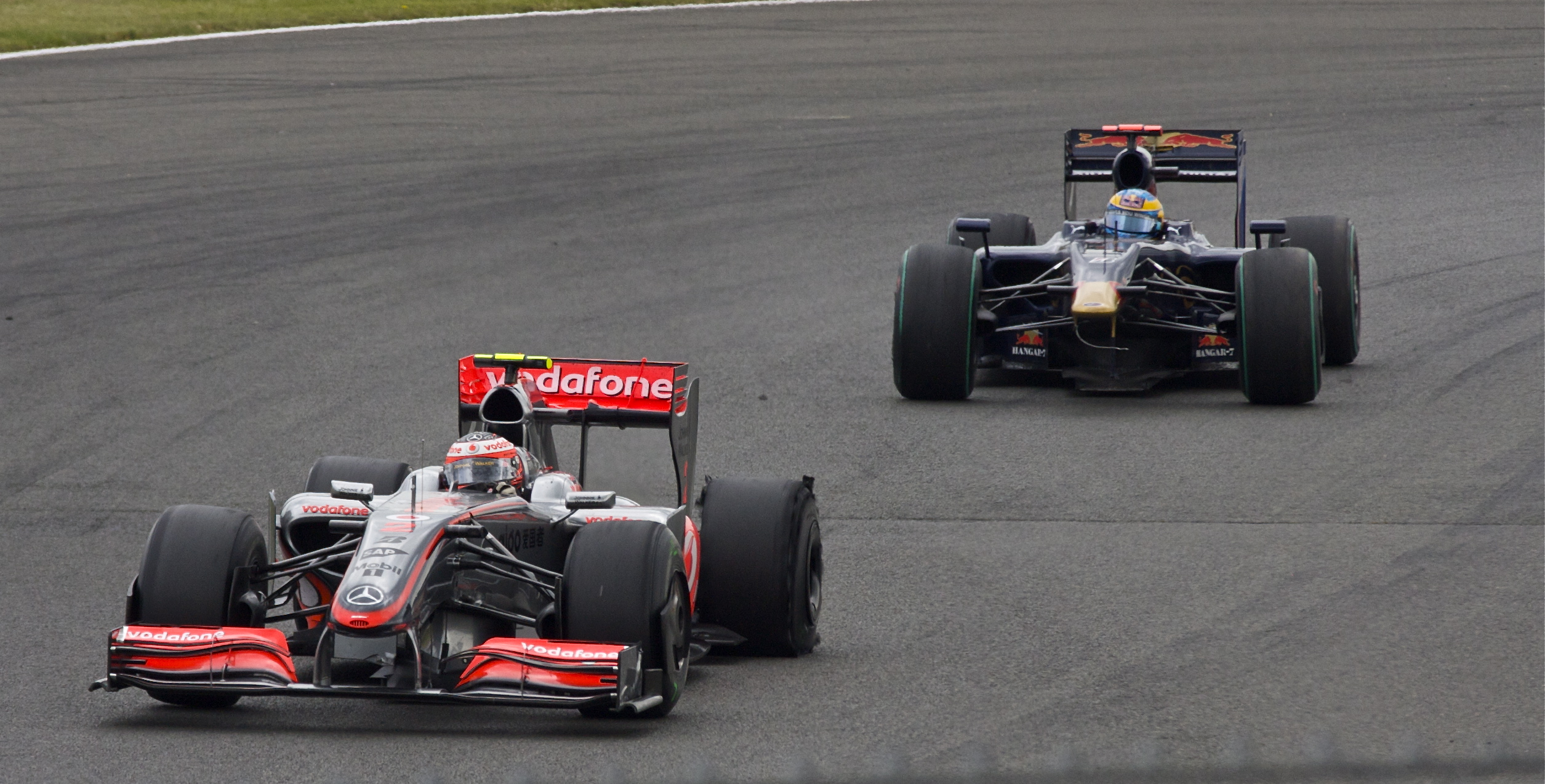
Heikki Kovalainen (foreground) and Sébastien Bourdais were the only retirements of the race after their collision on lap 36.

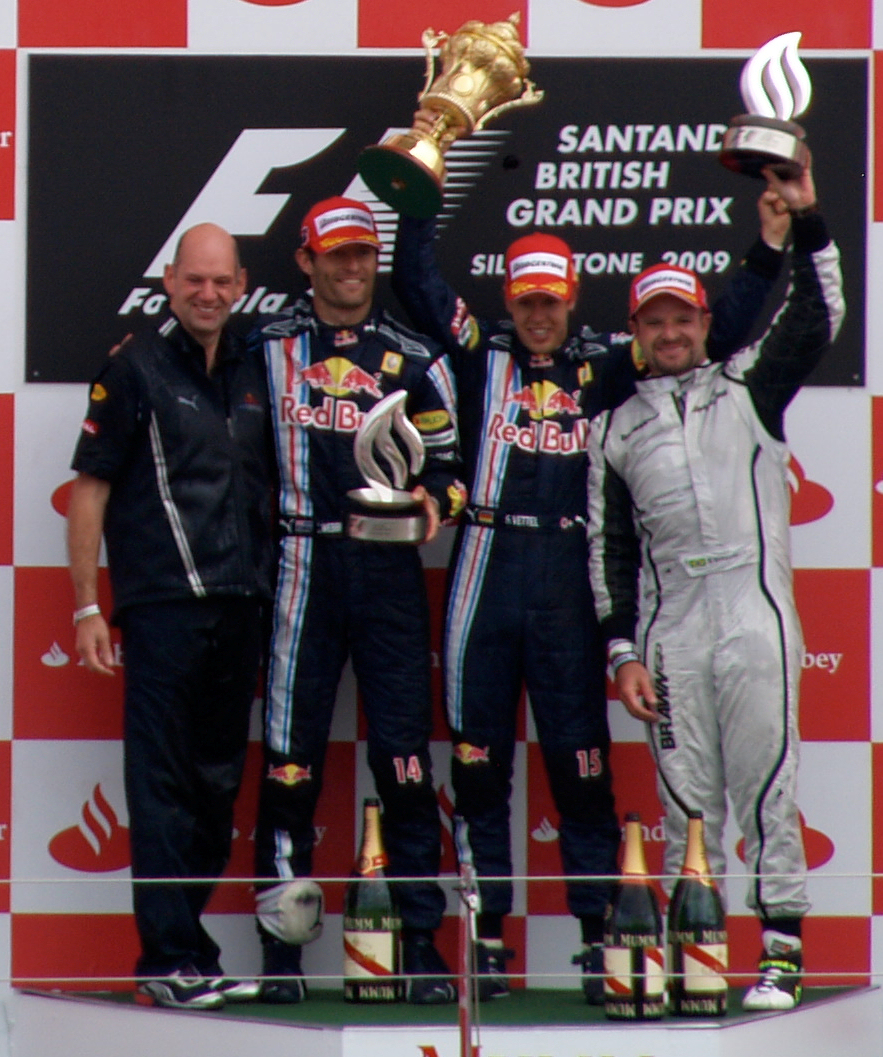
The podium ceremony after the race

Pos	No	Driver	Constructor	Part 1	Part 2	Part 3	Grid
1	15	(Germany) Sebastian Vettel	Red Bull-Renault	1:18.685	1:18.119	1:19.509	1
2	23	(Brazil) Rubens Barrichello	Brawn-Mercedes	1:19.325	1:18.335	1:19.856	2
3	14	(Australia) Mark Webber	Red Bull-Renault	1:18.674	1:18.209	1:19.868	3
4	9	(Italy) Jarno Trulli	Toyota	1:18.886	1:18.240	1:20.091	4
5	17	(Japan) Kazuki Nakajima	Williams-Toyota	1:18.530	1:18.575	1:20.216	5
6	22	(United Kingdom) Jenson Button	Brawn-Mercedes	1:18.957	1:18.663	1:20.289	6
7	16	(Germany) Nico Rosberg	Williams-Toyota	1:19.228	1:18.591	1:20.361	7
8	10	(Germany) Timo Glock	Toyota	1:19.198	1:18.791	1:20.490	8
9	4‡	(Finland) Kimi Räikkönen	Ferrari‡	1:19.010	1:18.566	1:20.715	9
10	7	(Spain) Fernando Alonso	Renault	1:19.167	1:18.761	1:20.741	10
11	3‡	(Brazil) Felipe Massa	Ferrari‡	1:19.148	1:18.927		11
12	5	(Poland) Robert Kubica	BMW Sauber	1:19.730	1:19.308		12
13	2	(Finland) Heikki Kovalainen	McLaren-Mercedes	1:19.732	1:19.353		13
14	8	(Brazil) Nelson Piquet Jr.	Renault	1:19.555	1:19.392		14
15	6	(Germany) Nick Heidfeld	BMW Sauber	1:19.559	1:19.448		15
16	21	(Italy) Giancarlo Fisichella	Force India-Mercedes	1:19.802			16
17	11	(France) Sébastien Bourdais	Toro Rosso-Ferrari	1:19.898			17
18	20	(Germany) Adrian Sutil	Force India-Mercedes	1:19.909			PL
19	1	(United Kingdom) Lewis Hamilton	McLaren-Mercedes	1:19.917			18
20	12	(Switzerland) Sébastien Buemi	Toro Rosso-Ferrari	1:20.236			19

=== Race ===
Pos	No	Driver	Constructor	Laps	Time/Retired	Grid	Points
1	15	(Germany) Sebastian Vettel	Red Bull-Renault	60	1:22:49.328	1	10
2	14	(Australia) Mark Webber	Red Bull-Renault	60	+15.188	3	8
3	23	(Brazil) Rubens Barrichello	Brawn-Mercedes	60	+41.175	2	6
4	3‡	(Brazil) Felipe Massa	Ferrari	60	+45.043	11	5
5	16	(Germany) Nico Rosberg	Williams-Toyota	60	+45.915	7	4
6	22	(United Kingdom) Jenson Button	Brawn-Mercedes	60	+46.285	6	3
7	9	(Italy) Jarno Trulli	Toyota	60	+1:08.307	4	2
8	4‡	(Finland) Kimi Räikkönen	Ferrari	60	+1:09.622	9	1
9	10	(Germany) Timo Glock	Toyota	60	+1:09.823	8	
10	21	(Italy) Giancarlo Fisichella	Force India-Mercedes	60	+1:11.522	16	
11	17	(Japan) Kazuki Nakajima	Williams-Toyota	60	+1:14.023	5	
12	8	(Brazil) Nelson Piquet Jr.	Renault	59	+1 lap	14	
13	5	(Poland) Robert Kubica	BMW Sauber	59	+1 lap	12	
14	7	(Spain) Fernando Alonso	Renault	59	+1 lap	10	
15	6	(Germany) Nick Heidfeld	BMW Sauber	59	+1 lap	15	
16	1	(United Kingdom) Lewis Hamilton	McLaren-Mercedes	59	+1 lap	18	
17	20	(Germany) Adrian Sutil	Force India-Mercedes	59	+1 lap	PL	
18	12	(Switzerland) Sébastien Buemi	Toro Rosso-Ferrari	59	+1 lap	19	
Ret	11	(France) Sébastien Bourdais	Toro Rosso-Ferrari	37	Collision damage	17	
Ret	2	(Finland) Heikki Kovalainen	McLaren-Mercedes	36	Collision damage	13	

== Championship standings after the race ==
Drivers' Championship standings

Pos.	Driver	Points
1	(United Kingdom) Jenson Button	64
2	(Brazil) Rubens Barrichello	41
3	(Germany) Sebastian Vettel	39
4	(Australia) Mark Webber	35.5
5	(Italy) Jarno Trulli	21.5

Constructors' Championship standings

	Pos.	Constructor	Points
	1	(United Kingdom) Brawn-Mercedes	105
	2	(Austria) Red Bull-Renault	74.5
	3	(Japan) Toyota	34.5
	4	(Italy) Ferrari	26
1	5	(United Kingdom) Williams-Toyota	15.5

- Note: Only the top five positions are included for both sets of standings.

== See also ==
- 2009 Silverstone GP2 Series round

Previous race: 2009 Turkish Grand Prix	FIA Formula One World Championship; 2009 season	Next race: 2009 German Grand Prix
Previous race: 2008 British Grand Prix	British Grand Prix	Next race: 2010 British Grand Prix
