= Nick Fry =

British businessman (born 1956)

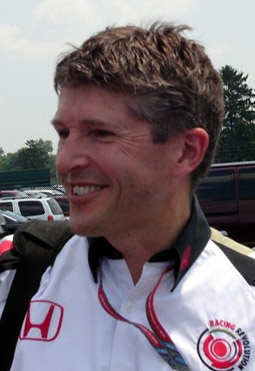
- Fry at the 2006 United States Grand Prix
- Born: Nicholas Richard Fry; 29 June 1956 (age 70)
- Occupation: Chairman of McLaren Applied
- Known for: Former CEO of Mercedes AMG Petronas Formula One Team

Nicholas Richard Fry (born 29 June 1956 in the United Kingdom) is the former Chief Executive Officer of the Mercedes AMG Petronas Formula One Team, having previously served in similar roles at previous incarnations of the company.

== Career ==
His career in motoring started with the Ford Motor Company in 1977, as a graduate trainee from the University of Wales with a degree in Economics. Working first in Sales and then Market Research, in 1978, he was moved to Product Development as Product Planner. He helped develop a variety of models over the next 12 years, including several performance models like the Ford Escort Cosworth, the RS200 and others. He also spent a spell at Aston Martin in the early 1990s whilst the company was under Ford ownership, overseeing the development and launch of the critically acclaimed DB7 model and switch from manufacturer of handbuilt-only vehicles at the traditional Newport Pagnell site to a higher-volume producer at a new factory operation at Bloxham.

Following this spell at Aston Martin, he returned to Ford in 1995, taking over as director of Service Engineering within the Customer Service Division, his time there being most noticeable for an early television appearance in a combative appearance opposite Anne Robinson on the BBC's Watchdog programme, robustly defending Ford's handling of a safety recall campaign for brake servo assist pumps in its diesel car range.

Fry joined Prodrive as managing director in January 2001, upon the persuasion of David Richards, where he has been responsible for leading Prodrive's expansion into outsourced engineering services. Within four months of his appointment, Prodrive Automotive Technology had a full order book for 2001 and major steps had been taken to grow the company in the UK and beyond with the acquisition of the Tickford Group. This expansion saw Fry become group managing director overseeing both the company's engineering and racing operations.

The 2001 World Rally Championship started poorly for Subaru and their lead driver Richard Burns and at the request of Subaru management, Fry became involved with the team and sought the advice of Burns on reorganisation. The team’s fortunes improved and Richard Burns won the World Rally Drivers Championship that year. A similar car was entered by Fry for Subaru in the North American SCCA ProRally Championship and Mark Lovell became drivers Champion. Lovell subsequently won the 2003 Pike’s Peak Hillclimb in a Prodrive prepared Subaru.

Under Fry’s leadership a Prodrive designed and prepared Ferrari 550 won the GTS class at Le Mans in 2003.

Early in 2002, he was appointed Managing Director of BAR F1 in addition to his Prodrive responsibilities. After significant reorganisation of the team, BAR became runner-up to Ferrari in the 2004 FIA F1 World Constructors Championship and Fry achieved his first F1 victory as Chief Executive and BAR’s only race win when Jenson Button took the chequered flag at the 2006 Hungarian Grand Prix.

Under Honda ownership between 2005 and 2008, Fry spearheaded significant investment in the Honda F1 Team HQ in Brackley, Northamptonshire, including the building of a state-of-the-art wind tunnel, new manufacturing facilities and installation of new Computational Fluid Dynamics (CFD) capability which paved the way for success in 2009 and beyond.

These investments helped Fry attract Ross Brawn, one of the most successful F1 Technical Directors in F1 history, to the team late in 2007 and during 2008 the pair set about designing a car and team structure which would take full advantage of F1 rule changes planned for 2009. However, in late 2008, due to the 2008 financial crisis, Honda withdrew from F1 at short notice. Fry and Brawn managed to persuade Honda to continue to support the team over the winter of 2008/9 whilst they sought to attract a new investor and to allow continuation of preparations for the 2009 season.

A global search for suitable investors failed and Fry as CEO and Brawn as Team Principal took ownership of the team and all its liabilities and re-named the team Brawn GP. Mercedes agreed to sell the team engines for the season and after a rapid re-design of the car to suit a Mercedes instead of Honda engine the team managed to get cars and drivers Jenson Button and Rubens Barrichello to the final F1 test before the 2009 season opener in Melbourne.

The car proved significantly faster than all others partly as a result of a controversial ‘double diffuser’ aerodynamic feature which gave the cars more downforce. The design was unsuccessfully challenged by several other teams who were subsequently forced to incorporate the feature into their own cars. The 2009 Brawn scored a 1-2 finish in the Melbourne Grand Prix and won 8 races during the season, 4 as 1-2 finishes. Jenson Button became World Drivers Champion and the Team won the Constructor title on its first attempt. The story of 2009 is told in a book ‘Survive Drive Win’ co-authored by Fry and ex-Times journalist Ed Gorman.

In 2010, Mercedes-Benz became majority owners of the Brawn team and Fry left the team in 2013. In 2018 Fry joined professional esports organisation Fnatic as head of commercial strategy and Chairman and in September 2021 Nick Fry joined McLaren Applied at the request of owners Greybull Capital as Chairman. In 2022 McLaren Applied were awarded the contract by the FIA to develop a new engine control system for the 2026 F1 season. In 2023 Fry was successful with McLaren Applied and Greybull in taking ownership of Dutch e-bike manufacturer VanMoof and Italian solar inverter experts Fimer.

The story of Brawn GP and Fry's role features in a four-part documentary Brawn: The Impossible Formula 1 Story, hosted by Keanu Reeves, which was released on Disney+ in November 2023.
