= 2009 European Grand Prix =

Coordinates: 39°27′32″N 0°19′54″W

Race 11 of 17 in the 2009 Formula One World Championship
← Previous race	Next race →
- The Valencia Street Circuit

Race details
- Date: 23 August 2009
- Official name: 2009 Formula 1 Telefónica Grand Prix of Europe
- Location: Valencia Street Circuit, Valencia, Spain
- Course: Temporary street circuit
- Course length: 5.419 km (3.367 miles)
- Distance: 57 laps, 308.883 km (191.931 miles)
- Weather: Hot and dry with temperatures reaching up to 33 °C (91 °F)

Pole position
Driver	(United Kingdom) Lewis Hamilton	McLaren-Mercedes
- Time: 1:39.498

Fastest lap
Driver	(Germany) Timo Glock	Toyota
- Time: 1:38.683 on lap 55

Podium
First	(Brazil) Rubens Barrichello	Brawn-Mercedes
Second	(United Kingdom) Lewis Hamilton	McLaren-Mercedes
Third	(Finland) Kimi Räikkönen	Ferrari

The 2009 European Grand Prix (formally the 2009 Formula 1 Telefónica Grand Prix of Europe) was a Formula One motor race held on 23 August 2009 at the Valencia Street Circuit in Valencia, Spain. It was the 11th race of the 2009 Formula One season. The race was contested over 57 laps, an overall race distance of 308.9 km (191.9 mi). The winner was Rubens Barrichello for Brawn GP after starting from third on the grid. The 2008 world champion Lewis Hamilton finished second for McLaren-Mercedes, while 2007 world champion Kimi Räikkönen finished in third for Ferrari. Championship leader Jenson Button finished in seventh for the second race in a row, but extended his lead as Red Bull Racing's Mark Webber and Sebastian Vettel both failed to score.

It was Barrichello's first Grand Prix victory since the 2004 Chinese Grand Prix, 85 races earlier, while he was still driving for Ferrari. He also marked the 100th victory for a Brazilian driver in F1. The race saw the debut of GP2 Series driver Romain Grosjean, who replaced Nelson Piquet Jr. at Renault. It also saw the Grand Prix return of Luca Badoer who had not raced since the 1999 Japanese Grand Prix, replacing the injured Felipe Massa at Ferrari. Also, Timo Glock scored his first, and Toyota's last, fastest lap.

Barring the first lap, no on-track overtakes were recorded during this race, making this one of five Formula One races to have no overtakes. It is the only one out of the five to have neither been held at Monaco (the 2003 and 2021 races), nor under any controversial circumstances (the 2005 United States Grand Prix which had only 6 runners, and the 2021 Belgian Grand Prix, which ran entirely under Safety Car conditions).

== Report ==
=== Background ===
Jenson Button headed into the weekend still on top of the Drivers' Championship, 18.5 points in front of Mark Webber who had jumped ahead of team-mate Sebastian Vettel, who was on 47 points and only 3 ahead of Brazilian Rubens Barrichello.

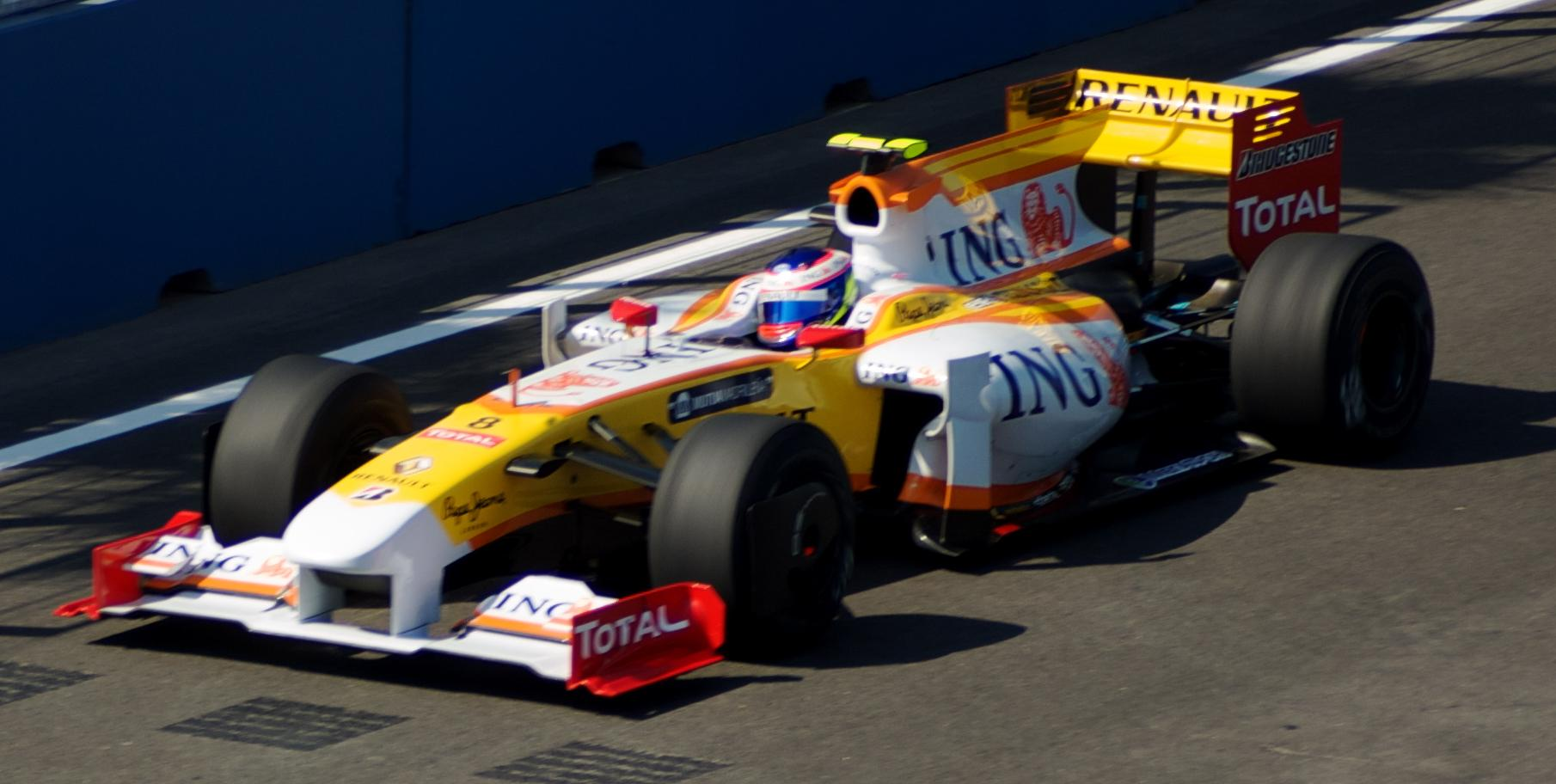
Romain Grosjean made his Formula One debut for Renault after the team's one-race ban following the Hungarian Grand Prix was overturned on appeal.

Brawn GP still lead the Constructor's Championship by 15.5 points from Red Bull Racing, with a further 58.5 points separating the latter from defending champions Ferrari. Ferrari had overtaken Toyota after Kimi Räikkönen has finished 2nd place in the previous race.

"I did not have a holiday. I just worked very hard in a physical way because after Felipe’s accident and Michael tried to drive the car it was very clear for us that, if Michael was not able, then it was my turn. I kept really concentrating and thinking about everything I could do to be in the best position for the race. I did really a lot of training. I drove a go-kart because I think it is very good for general training. Obviously I did the special training for the neck with my special machine to improve all the muscle and the resistance of the heart, so I was pushing really hard."

— Luca Badoer, talking about his preparations.

Felipe Massa had dominated the 2008 race, leading 50 of 57 laps from pole and setting the fastest lap in the process. Former European Grand Prix winners Rubens Barrichello and Fernando Alonso were also racing, though Massa was the only race winner at the current circuit. He would miss the Grand Prix after undergoing surgery following an accident in the second part of qualifying at the Hungarian Grand Prix. He had life-threatening injuries including a fractured skull, and it was expected that he would be in recovery for at least six weeks. Consequently, this Grand Prix saw the return of Luca Badoer to Formula One in order to replace him, Michael Schumacher having been ruled out after a motorbike accident left him with pain in the neck. Badoer had the record for most races in Formula One without points with 48; he was perhaps closest to scoring points when he retired from fourth in the 1999 European Grand Prix for Minardi.

Meanwhile, Renault announced on 4 August that Nelson Piquet Jr.'s contract with the team had been terminated with immediate effect; this decision was made after Piquet had not scored a single point all season. His replacement Romain Grosjean was announced on 18 August; it was believed that he would be racing for the remainder of the season.

Renault had initially been suspended from the Grand Prix as a result of the events that led to a wheel coming off Alonso's car during the Hungarian Grand Prix. However, Renault appealed to the FIA Court of Appeal, who overturned the suspension, and enabled Alonso to race at his second home Grand Prix.

=== Practice ===
Three practice sessions were held before the start of qualifying; the first was held on Friday morning and the second in the afternoon. Both sessions lasted 1 hour and 30 minutes with weather conditions dry throughout, as the air temperature at 27 °C (80 °F) and the track temperature at 36 °C (97 °F) in session one. Session two saw the air temperature at 30 °C (86 °F) and the track temperature rise dramatically to 52 °C (125 °F) in session two. The third session was held on Saturday morning and lasted 1 hour; it was also dry throughout with the air temperature at 28 °C (82 °F) and the track temperature at 41 °C (106 °F).

"It was a positive day for us with some good laps and the car performed well right from the start of the first session. We worked on the set-up throughout the day and now we’re pretty much happy with what we have so I think we are in good shape for the rest of the weekend. The incident with Nick Heidfeld this afternoon was a normal incident that can happen during racing or free practice. For tomorrow, we will try our best to get on the front row of the grid with the objective of scoring points on Sunday"

— Fernando Alonso, on a positive day of practice.

Brawn came back to form with the track temperature higher than at other circuits making Barrichello the pace-setter with the two McLarens behind him. Kovalainen and Hamilton were only separated by 0.018 seconds. Nico Rosberg who has topped most Friday practice sessions throughout the season struggled in his Williams coming 14th in session 1, 1.3 seconds off Barrichello, while team-mate Kazuki Nakajima fared better, coming 7th. However both Rosberg and Nakajima got into the top five in the second session. Fernando Alonso in his home grand prix topped the second session while Hamilton came last after spinning out early on and damaging his car.

Renault's Romain Grosjean had a solid two sessions, coming 17th and 13th respectively, although Alonso outpaced him in each by over a second. Luca Badoer came 20th and 18th in the two Friday sessions as he continued to struggle with the car as team-mate Kimi Räikkönen was 11th and 10th in the two sessions. The Toyotas struggled in session 1 with Jarno Trulli and Timo Glock coming 18th and 19th respectively. Although there was a small piece of hope as Trulli in the second session came 12th and Glock came 15th, 0.225 seconds behind his team-mate.

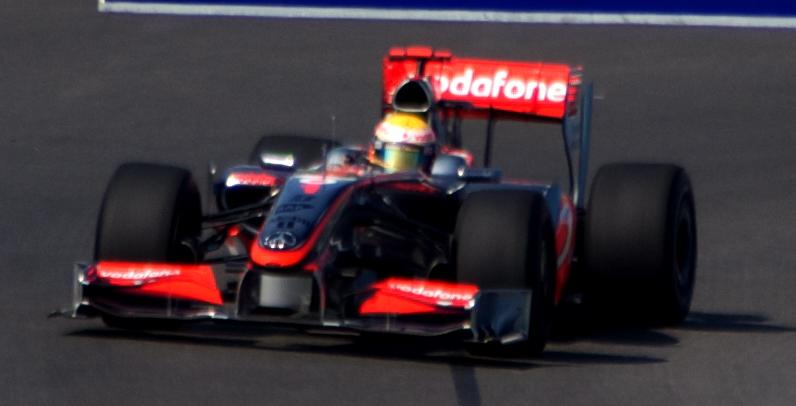
Lewis Hamilton took pole position, ahead of McLaren team-mate Heikki Kovalainen.

Force India's big updates were showing improvements as Adrian Sutil came 6th in the first session, while in the second session Sutil came 6th again while Giancarlo Fisichella showed a bit of form when he came in 8th. BMW Sauber were still struggling as they came 12th and 15th. But Robert Kubica was hopefully showing a light at the end of the tunnel as he came 7th in the second session, splitting the two Force Indias.

Red Bull seemed to be struggling in the hotter conditions as they were outpaced in both sessions by title challengers Brawn. Vettel (5th and 9th) and Webber (8th and 14th) were hopeful things would improve on Saturday.

It was a surprise result on Saturday as Adrian Sutil topped the time sheets, as Vettel's engine blew halfway through the session causing it to be red-flagged as oil was on the track. The other Force India, Fisichella, was 0.621 seconds behind his team-mate in P6. Kazuki Nakajima came in 2nd with Robert Kubica coming in 3rd. Heikki Kovalainen was the only one of the major contenders for pole in the top 5 as he came in 4th ahead of Nico Rosberg.

The Brawns were a little off the pace as Button (7th) and Barrichello (12th) were hoping for better. Both Red Bull cars were in the bottom 5 as Vettel (18th) and Webber (17th) continued to struggle in the hot conditions. Luca Badoer continued to be well behind the pace as he came in at 20th, 3.055 seconds behind session winner Adrian Sutil.

=== Qualifying ===
"Well, I clearly went over the limit. In hindsight you can always argue and think you could have done it a bit better. But in qualifying you have to go for it. It was incredibly close. Had I not pushed to the absolute limit I could have dropped three or four places easily, so I went for it. It didn’t work out this time but luckily I did not lose more than one place, so it is fine. It is absolutely a great place to start tomorrow. I think we have done a good improvement from Hungary on my side of the garage, so I think everybody can be very pleased in the garage and also back in Woking. We have been working very hard this week since the shut-down and fingers crossed it is paying off now."

— Heikki Kovalainen, on his mistake in the penultimate corner

"We haven’t seen this for a long time. Last year and in 2007 there were times where we only had to do one run in qualifying. This year we have had to go in all guns blazing and use up every minute and every second of the qualifying session. But very fortunately I managed to do a couple of good laps, so I did not have to do too many. But it can always be improved, so for sure going into tomorrow we stand in the best position for myself and Heikki for a podium. But it all depends on strategy and how the start goes and how the rest of the race goes."

— Lewis Hamilton, on his chances for the race.

The qualifying session on Saturday afternoon was split into three parts. The first part ran for 20 minutes, and cars that finished the session 16th or lower were eliminated from qualifying. The second part of qualifying lasted 15 minutes and eliminated cars that finished in positions 11 to 15. The final part of qualifying determined the positions from first to tenth, and decided pole position. Cars which failed to make the final session could refuel before the race, so ran lighter in those sessions. Cars which competed in the final session of qualifying were not allowed to refuel before the race, and as such carried more fuel than in the previous sessions. Weather conditions for the session saw the air temperature at 30 °C (86 °F) and the track temperature at 39 °C (102 °F).

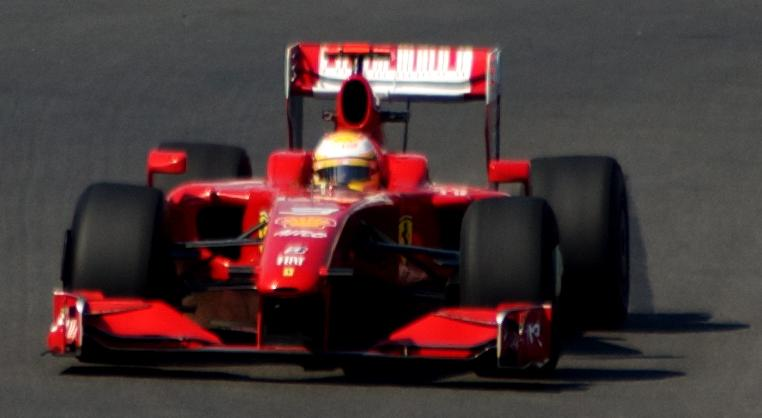
Luca Badoer qualified last for his first Grand Prix in ten years.

The first part of qualifying saw Button top the time sheets, with a lap of 1:38.531. With all the optimism of the pace of the Force India, Fisichella came 16th and was knocked out. Another big name that failed to make it was Kazuki Nakajima who came 2nd in practice just a few hours beforehand. Trulli, Alguersuari and Badoer were the others that joined them in not making it through to Q2.

The second session was topped by the other Brawn, Rubens Barrichello, a time of 1:38.076; half a second quicker than the quickest time in Q1. Sebastian Buemi came bottom of the session, half a second behind débutante Romain Grosjean in 14th. Glock, Sutil and Heidfeld were the others eliminated. Robert Kubica ended a long drought and made it to Q3.

The final 10-minute shoot-out began with very close lap times. As the chequered flag fell everyone was on their final lap. Button was the first of the main contenders to cross it for the final time and he didn't improve and stayed 5th. Next was Barrichello as he crossed the line and didn't improve and stayed 2nd. Kovalainen looked set for pole position but a lockup and a slide in the final corner could only get him up into second, so Hamilton didn't feel the need to complete his lap with no one else on fast laps. Hamilton got his first pole position of the season, but more importantly, it was a McLaren 1–2. Barrichello came third and a surprise 4th for Vettel as he split the Brawns. Räikkönen even with race fuel on board posted a lap time that was 1.279 seconds quicker than Luca Badoer's time in Q1 on low fuel. It was McLaren's first front-row lockout since the 2008 Hungarian Grand Prix and first time Lewis Hamilton had been on pole since the 2008 Chinese Grand Prix. Hamilton became the first driver to take pole position with a KERS car. This was also the first instance of an all KERS front row.

The fuel-adjusted times showed that Barrichello was actually the fastest in qualifying with Kovalainen 0.216 seconds behind him. Hamilton was third with Button in fourth and Vettel in 5th. Even though it had been an encouraging sign to see BMW in the top 10, the fuel-adjustments showed that even with fuel taken into account, the BMW was still 1.114 seconds slower than the Brawn of Rubens Barrichello.

=== Race ===
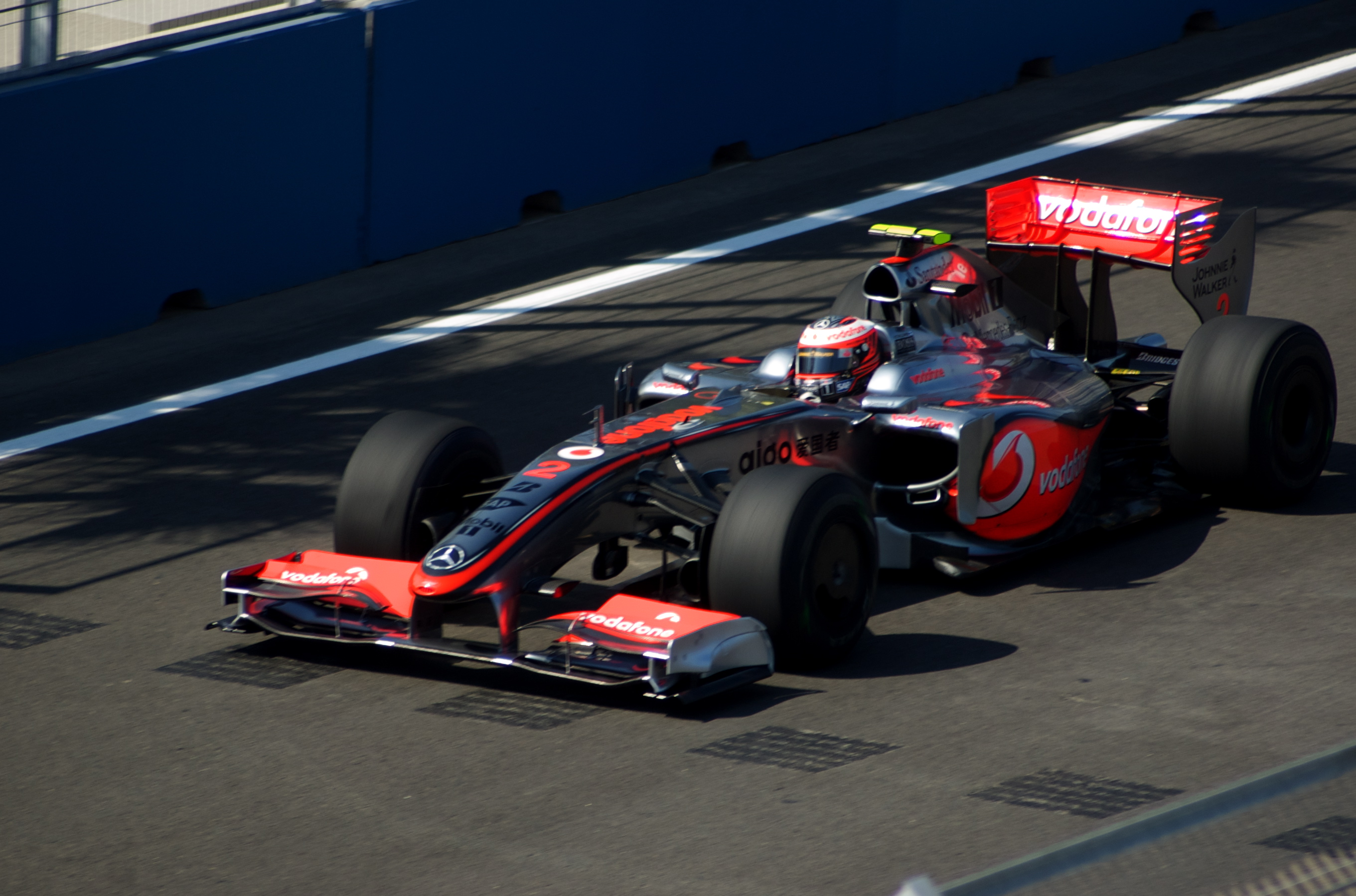
Heikki Kovalainen achieved his best finish of the 2009 season, in fourth position.

Around 12:00 (UTC) the formation lap for the Grand Prix started with race starting a few minutes later. With the air temperature at 31 °C (88 °F) and the track temperature at 49 °C (120 °F), it looked like the conditions were favouring the Brawn cars. The race started with Lewis Hamilton, Heikki Kovalainen and Rubens Barrichello as the top three after the first lap. Kimi Räikkönen had a good start making his way to fourth from sixth on the grid. Jenson Button had a poor start dropping to ninth in the first few corners, while Luca Badoer starting from the back of the grid jumped six positions to 14th at the start. Romain Grosjean then tapped the rear of Badoer's Ferrari, causing the Italian to spin. Grosjean had to pit for repairs, as did Timo Glock after he and Sébastien Buemi collided, the Swiss driver also pitting for a new nose. Mark Webber down in ninth got on the radio claiming that Button had cut the chicane to stop Webber's attempt of a pass. Button then fell behind Webber although it is unclear whether it was a legitimate pass or Jenson let the Red Bull driver through.

On lap 15, Hamilton and Sebastian Vettel came into the pits. Hamilton rejoined in sixth place but Vettel's fuel pump failed to work so he had to come in again. Kovalainen came in a lap later while Barrichello was pushing to try to build a gap. Button and Räikkönen pitted on lap 18, the Finn coming out in eighth while Button rejoined in 11th. Barrichello came in on lap 19, the Brazilian had made a lot of ground as he rejoined just behind Lewis after being around 10 seconds adrift. But most importantly for Brawn he had jumped the other McLaren of Kovalainen. On lap 24, a lot of smoke was pouring from the rear end of Vettel's car and he retired with a suspected engine failure. Hamilton was ordered over the radio to try to cool down his rear brakes as the temperature were getting out of control, but he was unable to shake off the challenge of Barrichello in second.

"It has been fantastic. It has been a weekend that I will never forget especially because after five years you don’t forget how to do it, but it is tough. In the middle of the race they were telling me push, push, push and although you are pushing like hell there are some things that go through your mind. You know that you cannot commit any mistakes and you want to do it for yourself, you want to do it for your country and you want to do it for your family. There was a lot going through my mind but the car has been perfect and I want to thank the team for that because it wasn’t just me. The car was really brilliant."

— Rubens Barrichello, reflecting on a weekend that he will never forget.

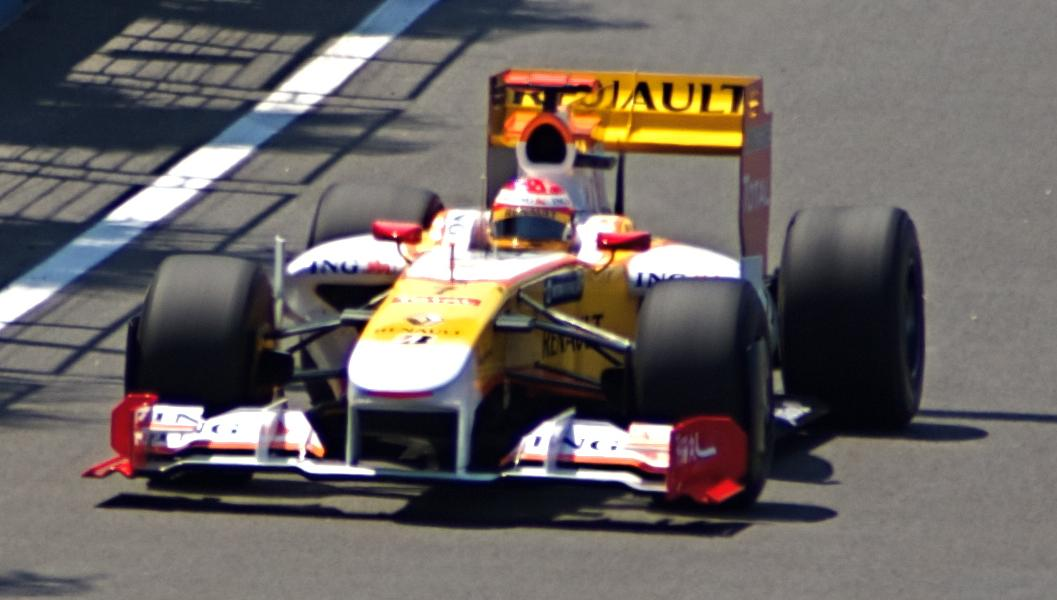
Fernando Alonso finished in sixth in front of his home crowd.

Hamilton seemed to have found some pace but he pitted soon after on lap 37. He came in but his new tyres were still in their blankets and a lot of time was wasted. Barrichello came in three laps later on lap 40 and came out in first. Button came in on lap 41 along with Alonso leaving Webber to tackle a bit of traffic. Webber pitted and the traffic had cost him as he came out behind Button and Kubica leaving himself out of the points. Räikkönen also jumped Kovalainen in the second round of stops.

As the race was heading into the closing stages, Hamilton seemed to be on a charge to try to catch the leading Brawn but in reality it looked only a mistake would stop the Brazilian winning. Meanwhile, Button was lapping a second off the pace just making sure his car got to the end. Kubica was catching Button at a high rate of knots but it seemed a long shot if Button was going to lose them two points. Barrichello took the chequered flag to win his first grand prix since the inaugural Chinese Grand Prix in 2004, and record the 100th win by a Brazilian driver in Formula One (including the victories of Emerson Fittipaldi, José Carlos Pace, Nelson Piquet, Ayrton Senna, Felipe Massa and Barrichello). Hamilton came second, while Finn Räikkönen came home in third. Kovalainen came fourth, while Nico Rosberg had a reasonably quiet race as he came home in fifth. Fernando Alonso came sixth in his home race, championship leader Jenson Button came seventh, while Robert Kubica came eighth, only his second points scoring finish so far this season. Neither Red Bull's Vettel or Webber scored a point, while Barrichello moved into second place in the drivers championship. Button kept his lead although he only added two points to his tally. Brawn edged further ahead in the constructors' championship by scoring 12 points with Red Bull not scoring a single point this weekend.

== Classification ==
=== Qualifying ===
Cars that use the KERS system are marked with "‡"

Pos	No	Driver	Constructor	Part 1	Part 2	Part 3	Grid
1	1‡	(United Kingdom) Lewis Hamilton	McLaren-Mercedes	1:38.649	1:38.182	1:39.498	1
2	2‡	(Finland) Heikki Kovalainen	McLaren-Mercedes	1:38.816	1:38.230	1:39.532	2
3	23	(Brazil) Rubens Barrichello	Brawn-Mercedes	1:39.019	1:38.076	1:39.563	3
4	15	(Germany) Sebastian Vettel	Red Bull-Renault	1:39.295	1:38.273	1:39.789	4
5	22	(United Kingdom) Jenson Button	Brawn-Mercedes	1:38.531	1:38.601	1:39.821	5
6	4‡	(Finland) Kimi Räikkönen	Ferrari	1:38.843	1:38.782	1:40.144	6
7	16	(Germany) Nico Rosberg	Williams-Toyota	1:39.039	1:38.346	1:40.185	7
8	7	(Spain) Fernando Alonso	Renault	1:39.155	1:38.717	1:40.236	8
9	14	(Australia) Mark Webber	Red Bull-Renault	1:38.983	1:38.625	1:40.239	9
10	5	(Poland) Robert Kubica	BMW Sauber	1:38.806	1:38.747	1:40.512	10
11	6	(Germany) Nick Heidfeld	BMW Sauber	1:39.032	1:38.826		11
12	20	(Germany) Adrian Sutil	Force India-Mercedes	1:39.145	1:38.846		12
13	10	(Germany) Timo Glock	Toyota	1:39.459	1:38.991		13
14	8	(France) Romain Grosjean	Renault	1:39.322	1:39.040		14
15	12	(Switzerland) Sébastien Buemi	Toro Rosso-Ferrari	1:38.912	1:39.514		15
16	21	(Italy) Giancarlo Fisichella	Force India-Mercedes	1:39.531			16
17	17	(Japan) Kazuki Nakajima	Williams-Toyota	1:39.795			17
18	9	(Italy) Jarno Trulli	Toyota	1:39.807			18
19	11	(Spain) Jaime Alguersuari	Toro Rosso-Ferrari	1:39.925			19
20	3‡	(Italy) Luca Badoer	Ferrari	1:41.413			20

=== Race ===
Cars that use the KERS system are marked with "‡"

Pos	No	Driver	Constructor	Laps	Time/Retired	Grid	Points
1	23	(Brazil) Rubens Barrichello	Brawn-Mercedes	57	1:35:51.289	3	10
2	1‡	(United Kingdom) Lewis Hamilton	McLaren-Mercedes	57	+2.358	1	8
3	4‡	(Finland) Kimi Räikkönen	Ferrari	57	+15.994	6	6
4	2‡	(Finland) Heikki Kovalainen	McLaren-Mercedes	57	+20.032	2	5
5	16	(Germany) Nico Rosberg	Williams-Toyota	57	+20.870	7	4
6	7	(Spain) Fernando Alonso	Renault	57	+27.744	8	3
7	22	(United Kingdom) Jenson Button	Brawn-Mercedes	57	+34.913	5	2
8	5	(Poland) Robert Kubica	BMW Sauber	57	+36.667	10	1
9	14	(Australia) Mark Webber	Red Bull-Renault	57	+44.910	9	
10	20	(Germany) Adrian Sutil	Force India-Mercedes	57	+47.935	12	
11	6	(Germany) Nick Heidfeld	BMW Sauber	57	+48.822	11	
12	21	(Italy) Giancarlo Fisichella	Force India-Mercedes	57	+1:03.614	16	
13	9	(Italy) Jarno Trulli	Toyota	57	+1:04.527	18	
14	10	(Germany) Timo Glock	Toyota	57	+1:26.519	13	
15	8	(France) Romain Grosjean	Renault	57	+1:31.774	14	
16	11	(Spain) Jaime Alguersuari	Toro Rosso-Ferrari	56	+1 Lap	19	
17	3‡	(Italy) Luca Badoer	Ferrari	56	+1 Lap	20	
18	17	(Japan) Kazuki Nakajima	Williams-Toyota	54	Tyre	17	
Ret	12	(Switzerland) Sébastien Buemi	Toro Rosso-Ferrari	41	Brakes	15	
Ret	15	(Germany) Sebastian Vettel	Red Bull-Renault	23	Engine	4	

== Championship standings after the race ==
Drivers' Championship standings

	Pos.	Driver	Points
	1	(United Kingdom) Jenson Button	72
2	2	(Brazil) Rubens Barrichello	54
1	3	(Australia) Mark Webber	51.5
1	4	(Germany) Sebastian Vettel	47
	5	(Germany) Nico Rosberg	29.5

Constructors' Championship standings

	Pos.	Constructor	Points
	1	(United Kingdom) Brawn-Mercedes	126
	2	(Austria) Red Bull-Renault	98.5
	3	(Italy) Ferrari	46
1	4	(United Kingdom) McLaren-Mercedes	41
1	5	(Japan) Toyota	38.5

- Note: Only the top five positions are included for both sets of standings.

== See also ==
- 2009 Valencia GP2 Series round

Previous race: 2009 Hungarian Grand Prix	FIA Formula One World Championship; 2009 season	Next race: 2009 Belgian Grand Prix
Previous race: 2008 European Grand Prix	European Grand Prix	Next race: 2010 European Grand Prix
