= 2009 Hungarian Grand Prix =

Coordinates: 47°34′44″N 19°14′55″E

Race 10 of 17 in the 2009 Formula One World Championship
← Previous race	Next race →

Race details
- Date: 26 July 2009
- Official name: Formula 1 ING Magyar Nagydíj 2009
- Location: Hungaroring, Mogyoród, Pest, Hungary
- Course: Permanent racing facility
- Course length: 4.381 km (2.722 miles)
- Distance: 70 laps, 306.630 km (190.531 miles)
- Weather: Sunny; 25 °C (77 °F)

Pole position
Driver	(Spain) Fernando Alonso	Renault
- Time: 1:21.569

Fastest lap
Driver	(Australia) Mark Webber	Red Bull-Renault
- Time: 1:21.931 on lap 65

Podium
First	(United Kingdom) Lewis Hamilton	McLaren-Mercedes
Second	(Finland) Kimi Räikkönen	Ferrari
Third	(Australia) Mark Webber	Red Bull-Renault

The 2009 Hungarian Grand Prix (officially known as the Formula 1 ING Magyar Nagydíj 2009) was a Formula One motor race held on 26 July 2009 at the Hungaroring in Mogyoród, 18 km (11 mi) north of Budapest, Hungary. It was the tenth race of the 2009 FIA Formula One World Championship. The 70-lap race was won by 2008 world champion Lewis Hamilton for McLaren-Mercedes, after starting from fourth place on the grid. The 2007 world champion Kimi Räikkönen finished second for Ferrari, with Red Bull Racing's Mark Webber finishing third. Championship leader Jenson Button had a poor race to finish seventh, allowing Webber to reduce the points gap in the championship.

Hamilton's win was his first since the 2008 Chinese Grand Prix, which was also the last time he had appeared on the podium. The result also marked the first time that a car equipped with a regenerative brake system (KERS) had won a race. Räikkönen's second place was Ferrari's best result of the season so far, but his teammate Felipe Massa suffered a serious accident during the second part of the Saturday afternoon qualifying session which left him with a fractured skull. The race also saw the debut of World Series by Renault racer and 2008 British Formula Three champion Jaime Alguersuari, who became the youngest Formula One driver in the championship's 59-year history, at the age of 19 years and 125 days, and the first to be born in the 1990s. He replaced the fired Sébastien Bourdais at Scuderia Toro Rosso.

== Background ==
Heading into the weekend, Jenson Button led the Drivers' Championship on 68 points for Brawn GP, 21 points clear of Red Bull Racing's Sebastian Vettel. Vettel's teammate Mark Webber, who signed a new one-year contract before the race weekend, was 1.5 points behind Vettel and an equal number ahead of Button's teammate Rubens Barrichello.

Brawn GP also held the lead in the Constructors' Championship, with a lead of 19.5 points from a resurgent Red Bull Racing, who were a further 48 points clear of Toyota. Toyota held an advantage of only 1.5 points over defending champions Scuderia Ferrari.

Webber won the previous race in Germany from pole position, to claim his first win at the 130th attempt. Despite an early drive-through penalty assessed for a dangerous manoeuvre to keep the Brawn GP car of Barrichello behind him at the start, the Australian driver had enough time in hand to rejoin out front and win by nearly ten seconds from Red Bull Racing teammate Vettel.

"I don't really care what all the people say, I just do my work. I do what I know, to be honest. I am here because Red Bull just asked me to, as I do Formula 3 or World Series or GP2, I don't care. I just drive the cars. That's my job and that's what I enjoy doing in life. I'm here because Red Bull just sent me a message telling me that I have to drive this car so I'm here. I don't care what other people say, that's the main thing, first of all. And the second thing is that I know what my expectation is, I know what my target is. I know that today I didn't make any mistakes and I hope tomorrow I don't and even in the race and that's how I work at the end. My target here is to drive the car and not make mistakes. Then we will talk about times and about speed. But I don't feel I am a danger, not really."

— Jaime Alguersuari, who was unfazed by the criticism directed at him for being too inexperienced for Formula One.

Felipe Massa was third, to earn his first podium of the 2009 season to date. Championship leader Button could only muster a fifth-place finish, after being overhauled by the one-stopping Williams of Nico Rosberg, who finished fourth having started fifteenth.

Prior to the race, the Hungarian Grand Prix had produced different winners for each of the last seven years, with Heikki Kovalainen (McLaren-Mercedes; 2008), Lewis Hamilton (McLaren–Mercedes; 2007), Button (Honda; 2006), Kimi Räikkönen (McLaren–Mercedes; 2005), Michael Schumacher (Ferrari; 2004), Fernando Alonso (Renault; 2003) and Barrichello (Ferrari; 2002) taking the chequered flag. The Hungaroring had also been the scene of the maiden victories of Button, Alonso and Kovalainen.

Much of the talk prior to the weekend was about the appointment of Jaime Alguersuari to replace Sébastien Bourdais at Scuderia Toro Rosso. Alguersuari did not have any circuit testing experience in a Formula One car, and had only undertaken straight-line aerodynamic tests the week before the Grand Prix, in Faenza. Felipe Massa felt that Alguersuari—who had 118 prior single-seater races under his belt, with 17 wins—was too young and inexperienced to be driving a contemporary Formula One car. Mark Webber and Jenson Button also expressed their fears about Alguersuari driving at the Hungaroring. However, Sebastian Vettel came to the support of the Spaniard, saying that he should take his time to build up speed.

== Practice ==
"I’ve got the full upgrade package that Lewis raced at the Nurburgring and the car now feels much better to drive. We’ve got a new floor, new front wing, updated bodywork and some small changes to the suspension. It’s a big package—and I know how hard the team has worked to get everything here. There are still components arriving at the circuit today! The grip level is so much higher now. Stability under braking is much better, and the guys have done a fantastic job to improve the balance at the rear. We still have to keep working hard to make further improvements—but this is a great starting point. I still think we need to look at the data and analyse the strength of the opposition. Of course, it would be fantastic to carry this over into qualifying and the race, but we need to be realistic: I’m sure tomorrow morning will give us a much clearer idea of the position of the Brawns and the Red Bulls. But after today’s performance, I’ll definitely be going for it."

— Heikki Kovalainen, who topped the first Friday practice session.

Three practice sessions were held before the race; the first was held on Friday morning and the second on Friday afternoon. Both sessions lasted 1 hour and 30 minutes with weather conditions dry throughout, the air temperature at 24 °C (75 °F), and the track temperature at 30 °C (86 °F). for session one. Session two saw the air temperature at 28 °C (82 °F), and the track temperature at 45 °C (113 °F). The third session was held on Saturday morning and lasted an hour, and was also dry throughout, with the air temperature at 21 °C (70 °F), and the track temperature at 26 °C (79 °F). McLaren were the pace-setters in both Friday practice sessions, with Kovalainen topping the first and Hamilton topping the second.

Apart from the upturn in McLaren's performance, the usual Friday pace-setters were also competitive, with Williams drivers Nico Rosberg and Kazuki Nakajima both setting times that were good enough for top five positions in both sessions. The Red Bull of Mark Webber was also in the top five in both sessions, as he continued his recent good form.

Brawn GP implemented their usual strategy of running with fuel during Friday practice sessions. In the first session, Jenson Button was tenth and Rubens Barrichello was thirteenth. In the second session, Barrichello improved to seventh place, while Button dropped back to thirteenth. That said, Button's lap time was only 0.727 seconds off the fastest time of Hamilton, in an extremely tight session.

Jarno Trulli was the top Toyota in both sessions, finishing up sixth and eighth, beating teammate Timo Glock, who was fourteenth and tenth. Renault had a mixed session, with Alonso and Nelson Piquet Jr. struggling to get the ideal setup for the car. Alonso was seven tenths of a second off in both sessions, while Piquet improving to just a tenth and half behind his teammate. Massa and Räikkönen posted times good enough for P7 and P8 in the first session, but were adrift in the second session, with neither driver in the top ten, which left the Ferrari drivers disappointed with the lack of pace.

BMW Sauber were another team to struggle in practice, with times some six tenths of a second off the pace, which left both drivers unhappy with the setup. Nick Heidfeld's time in the second session was their best showing, ending up in ninth position. Force India outpaced Toro Rosso in both sessions, with both cars lapping within a second of the best times. Giancarlo Fisichella (16th and 17th) and Adrian Sutil (18th and 16th) were both confident that they could improve on those times on Saturday. Sébastien Buemi found himself doing much of the setup work for the Italian outfit, improving his lap time by eight tenths of a second, between sessions. Alguersuari produced a solid performance in both sessions, but still ranked last in both sessions. Each driver completed 82 laps over the two sessions.

McLaren again topped the times during the Saturday practice session with Hamilton posting the best time. Heidfeld was a surprise second for BMW Sauber, with Nico Rosberg in third. Kovalainen was fourth, ahead of the Toro Rosso of Buemi and the Toyota of Glock. Glock's session was far from trouble-free, as his Toyota developed a hydraulic leak during its first flying lap. He returned to the track just before the end of the session, to record the sixth best time. Only seven tenths of a second split Heidfeld in second from Barrichello's Brawn in thirteenth. At one point, Jaime Alguersuari was as high as second position, before falling down to 18th by the end. Both Force Indias lapped slower than the teenager, with Sutil also having an incident, misjudging turn eight and hit the barrier.

== Qualifying ==
"It was quite a stressful qualifying to be honest. In Q1 we had the yellow flag from Toro Rosso I think in turn 13, so we were P15 at that moment and we had to get the lap to go through turn one. We did it at the end and then in the end in Q3 as you said the times were not working, so we were waiting in parc ferme, chatting between us drivers, asking what time you did, what time you did and try to find in which position you were. Now confirmation arrived that we are on pole. A fantastic effort from the team. We put some new stuff on the car at the Nürburgring that worked very well and here we confirmed that we made a step forward. But, obviously, it is not enough. We need to keep working but finally we found the direction to go."

— Fernando Alonso, after taking Renault's first pole position since the 2006 Chinese Grand Prix.

The qualifying session on Saturday afternoon was split into three parts. The first part ran for 20 minutes, and cars that finished the session 16th or lower were eliminated from qualifying. The second part of qualifying lasted 15 minutes and eliminated cars that finished in positions 11 to 15. The final part of qualifying determined the positions from first to tenth, and decided pole position. Cars which failed to make the final session could refuel before the race, so ran lighter in those sessions. Cars which competed in the final session of qualifying were not allowed to refuel before the race, and as such carried more fuel than in the previous sessions. Weather conditions for the session saw the air temperature at 23 °C (73 °F), and the track temperature at 41 °C (106 °F).

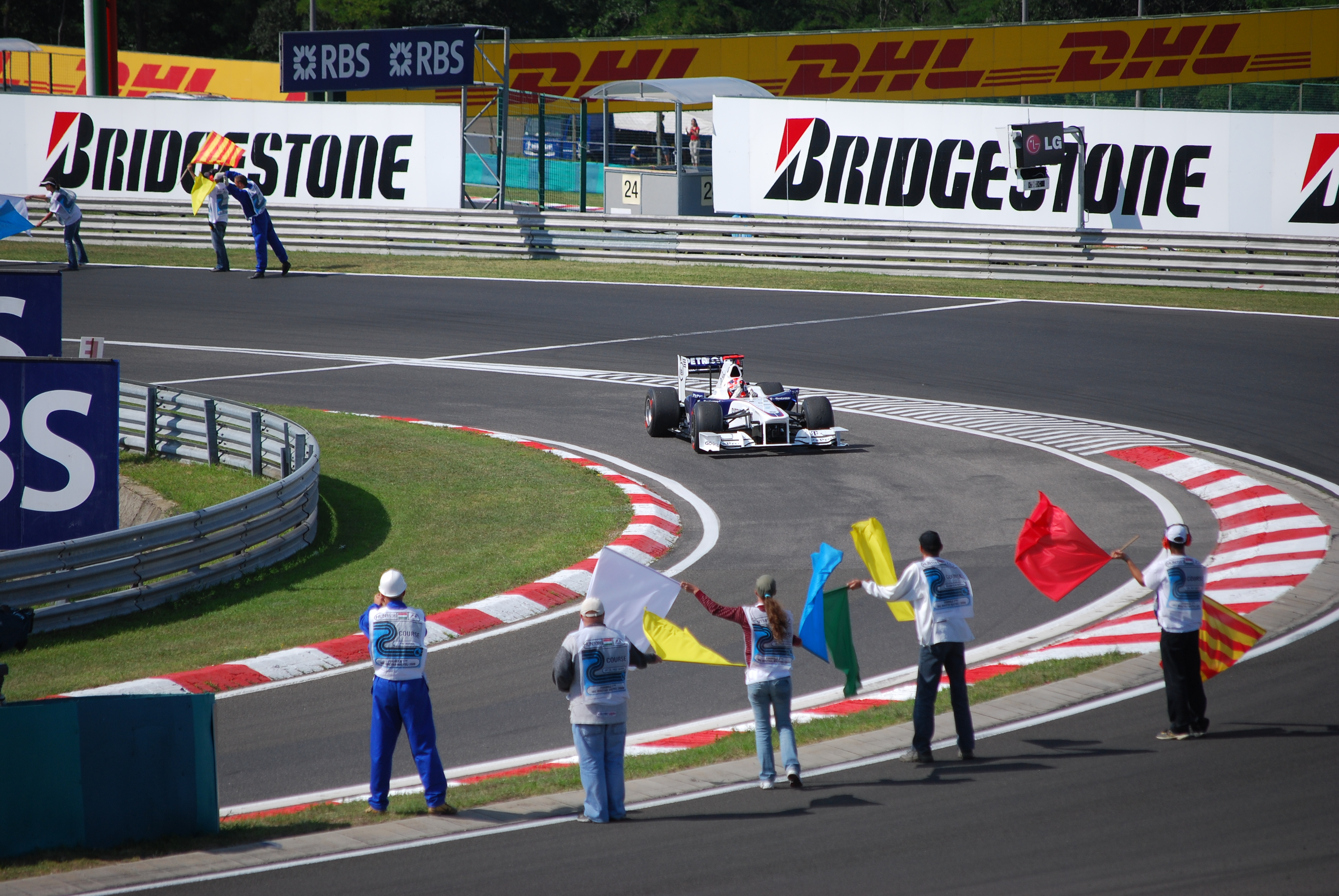
Robert Kubica failed to make it out of the first part of qualifying.

The first part of qualifying saw Rosberg top the times, with a lap of 1:20.793, towards the end of the session. Hamilton and Webber were the only other drivers to record laps in the 1:20s. Alguersuari, who was 19th with several minutes remaining, slowed out of turn 12 with a hydraulic failure that left him unable to return to the pits. He fell to 20th and last on the grid, after Sutil (who moved up to 18th) lapped quicker than he did. The two were joined on the sidelines by the BMW Saubers of Heidfeld and Robert Kubica, and the second Force India of Fisichella.

After a seven-minute break, the second part of the qualifying session got underway. With just a second covering the fifteen remaining drivers, many drivers set their quickest laps in the final few minutes of the session. As the session ended, the Ferrari of Massa, who was sixth at the time, was involved in a serious accident at turn four. Replays showed debris striking his Schuberth helmet, 1 inch above the left eye, when he was travelling at 261 km/h (162 mph). The impact knocked him unconscious, with his car straying towards the grass verge on the inside of turn four. The onboard footage from his car showed that he had his feet on both the accelerator and the brake pedals. The Ferrari decelerated at a force of between 0.6 and 1.4g and impacted with the barrier at 100 km/h (62 mph). After the car imbedded itself in the tyre barrier, the engine could be heard still revving on the limiter, indicating that Massa's foot was still pressing the accelerator and that he was thus unconscious. This accident came just six days after FIA Formula Two Championship driver Henry Surtees was fatally injured after being struck on the head by a wheel bouncing across the circuit at the Brands Hatch track in the United Kingdom, and provoked some discussion about the safety of open cockpit racing cars. The debris, a spring from the rear suspension damper (weighing around 800 grams), was suspected of having come from the car of Barrichello, who had reported that something had come loose minutes beforehand. Brawn confirmed the part had indeed come from Barrichello's car, and changed the same part on teammate Button's car ahead of the race. It was also subjected to an inspection during the third qualifying session, leaving Button with only one run for qualifying, due to the lengthy inspection.

Despite Massa's accident, some drivers improved their times towards the end of the session as they had passed the zone before the accident, meaning that Massa fell to eighth position. Button and Nakajima both progressed into the third part of qualifying, with their times set despite the yellow flag at turn four for Massa's accident. Barrichello's problem meant that he and the Brawn team missed out on the top ten shootout for the first time this season. He was joined on the sidelines by Buemi, Glock, Nelson Piquet Jr. and Trulli. Even though Massa's time was quick enough to progress to Q3, his crash ruled him out of any further participation in the session. He was slowly extricated from his damaged Ferrari, and taken to the infield medical centre, where he was stabilised before being airlifted to hospital. This meant that there were only nine drivers in the final part of qualifying, which was delayed by twenty minutes due to the lengthy amount of time taken to remove Massa, repair the tyre barrier and check the track for any further debris.

With qualifying nearing its conclusion, the official timing system malfunctioned, leaving the drivers bemused in the pit lane afterwards, asking each other their times for comparisons. The problem was later revealed by Formula One Management and LG as being a broken cable. When the timing system came back online, Fernando Alonso discovered that he had set the fastest time, recording his first pole since the 2007 Italian Grand Prix. Joining him on the front row was Vettel, with Webber and Hamilton on row two. On row three were Rosberg, who was top when the system went down, and defending race-winner Kovalainen. When the cars' starting weights were released post-qualifying, Alonso was light compared to all those around him. He was some 17.5 kg lighter than Vettel, and at the extreme, 27 kg lighter than Button, who qualified eighth.

Ferrari latterly confirmed that Massa would miss the Grand Prix due to his accident. He suffered a head cut, bone damage to his skull and a concussion, and remained under observation in intensive care, in the Állami Egészségügyi Központ military hospital in Budapest. He underwent successful surgery for the injuries he suffered in his accident. This meant that for the first time since the 2005 United States Grand Prix, a field of fewer than 20 drivers took part in a Grand Prix. It was also the first time that Ferrari fielded only one car in the race since the 2002 French Grand Prix when Rubens Barrichello failed to start due to ignition problems.

=== Qualifying classification ===
Cars that use the KERS system are marked with "‡"

Pos	No	Driver	Constructor	Part 1	Part 2	Part 3	Grid
1	7	(Spain) Fernando Alonso	Renault	1:21.313	1:20.826	1:21.569	1
2	15	(Germany) Sebastian Vettel	Red Bull-Renault	1:21.178	1:20.604	1:21.607	2
3	14	(Australia) Mark Webber	Red Bull-Renault	1:20.964	1:20.358	1:21.741	3
4	1‡	(United Kingdom) Lewis Hamilton	McLaren-Mercedes	1:20.842	1:20.465	1:21.839	4
5	16	(Germany) Nico Rosberg	Williams-Toyota	1:20.793	1:20.862	1:21.890	5
6	2‡	(Finland) Heikki Kovalainen	McLaren-Mercedes	1:21.659	1:20.807	1:22.095	6
7	4‡	(Finland) Kimi Räikkönen	Ferrari	1:21.500	1:20.647	1:22.468	7
8	22	(United Kingdom) Jenson Button	Brawn-Mercedes	1:21.471	1:20.707	1:22.511	8
9	17	(Japan) Kazuki Nakajima	Williams-Toyota	1:21.407	1:20.570	1:22.835	9
10	3‡	(Brazil) Felipe Massa	Ferrari	1:21.420	1:20.823	No time	
11	12	(Switzerland) Sébastien Buemi	Toro Rosso-Ferrari	1:21.571	1:21.002		10
12	9	(Italy) Jarno Trulli	Toyota	1:21.416	1:21.082		11
13	23	(Brazil) Rubens Barrichello	Brawn-Mercedes	1:21.558	1:21.222		12
14	10	(Germany) Timo Glock	Toyota	1:21.584	1:21.242		13
15	8	(Brazil) Nelson Piquet Jr.	Renault	1:21.278	1:21.389		14
16	6	(Germany) Nick Heidfeld	BMW Sauber	1:21.738			15
17	21	(Italy) Giancarlo Fisichella	Force India-Mercedes	1:21.807			16
18	20	(Germany) Adrian Sutil	Force India-Mercedes	1:21.868			17
19	5	(Poland) Robert Kubica	BMW Sauber	1:21.901			18
20	11	(Spain) Jaime Alguersuari	Toro Rosso-Ferrari	1:22.359			19

- ^1 – Felipe Massa was injured in the second phase of qualifying and therefore did not set a time for Q3.
- ^2 – Owing to Massa's inability to start the race, all cars behind him moved up one place to close the gap.

== Race ==
The conditions on the grid were dry before the race, the air temperature at 26 °C (79 °F), and the track temperature at 43 °C (109 °F). The formation lap for the race began at 14:00 local time (UTC+2), with the race beginning a couple of minutes later. Alonso retained his pole position lead into the first corner, followed by a fast-starting Hamilton, Webber, Räikkönen and Vettel, who had made a slow start from the "dirty" side of the grid. Hamilton and Räikkönen nearly touched on the run to turn one, which in effect slowed the Finn slightly and allowed Webber to maintain third. Hamilton ran slightly wide on the exit of the first corner, which allowed Webber to challenge him. The counter-effect caused Räikkönen and Vettel to stack up, with the German's Red Bull making slight contact with the rear of the Ferrari. Vettel lost further places to Rosberg and Kovalainen as a result of the incident. Räikkönen would latterly be investigated after the race for both of his first lap incidents. At the end of the first lap, Sutil came into the pits from 19th place with water pressure problems. The problem was terminal and he became the first retirement of the afternoon. Alonso started to pull away from the field, setting his fastest lap of the race (1:23.529) on lap four.

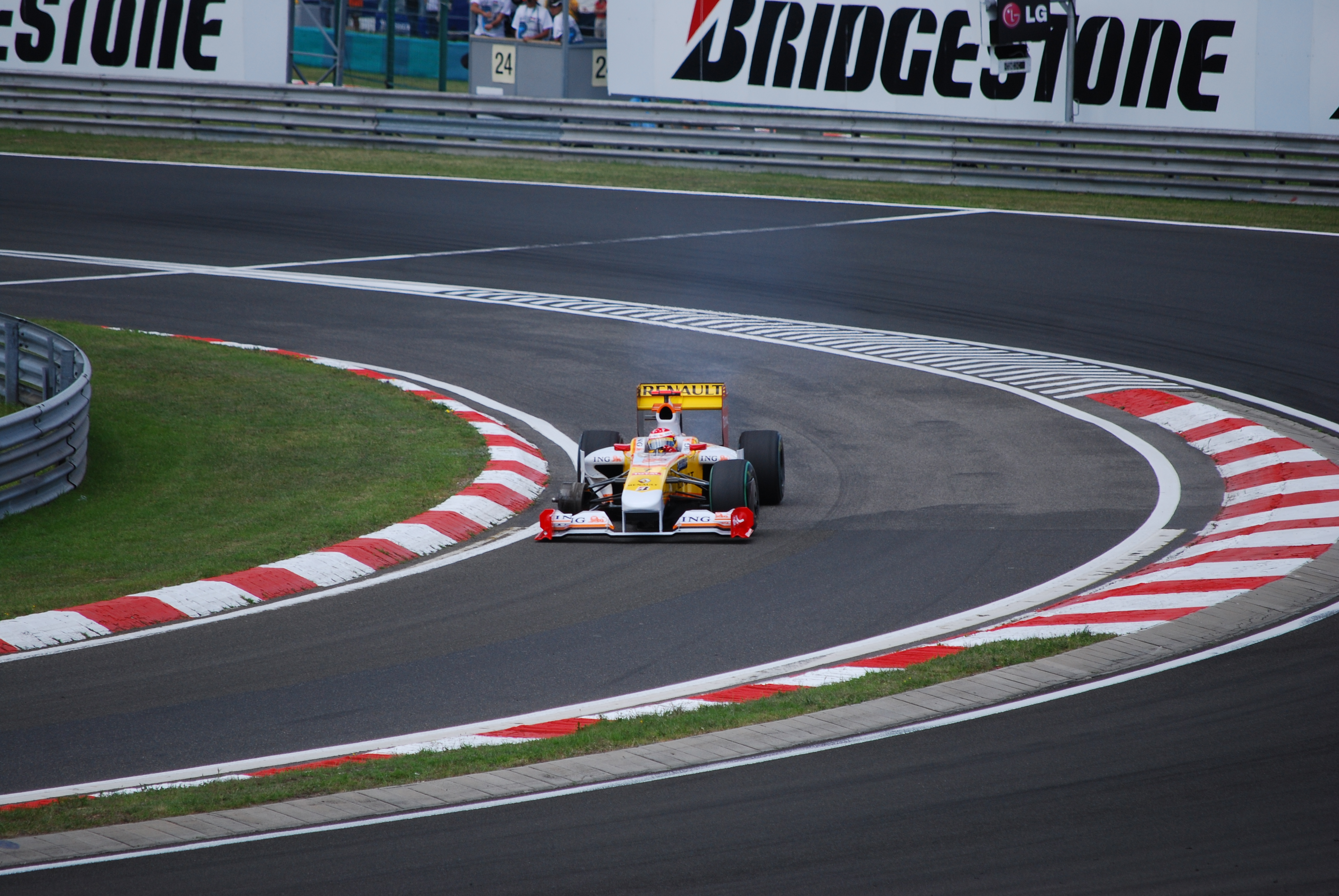
Fernando Alonso returning to the pits, after his Renault shed its right front wheel on lap thirteen.

Positions remained static until the start of lap five. Hamilton pressured Webber in turn one, and with the aid of the KERS button, overtook the Australian before turn two. Once clear of Webber, Hamilton started to cut into the gap that Alonso had built up at the front. Alonso's Renault was suffering from graining on its rear tyres (when the tyres shed little bits of rubber before sticking to the tread of the tyre, effectively separating the tyre from the track surface very slightly), and also a fuel pump problem, which forced him to change to a different fuel setting on the car. Alonso pitted on lap twelve, and was stationary for 6.4 seconds. However, he was released with his front right wheel incorrectly attached, causing the wheel-mounted brake duct or "spinner" to rotate while the wheel was turning. The duct then fell off and disintegrated at turn four, as Alonso continued to go round the circuit. The wheel then parted from the car at turn nine, and Alonso drove the car back to the pits on three wheels. The missing wheel was replaced, enabling him to continue in the race, but he returned to the pits on the following lap, as the earlier fuel pump problem proved terminal.

With Hamilton extending his lead to almost six seconds—including his fastest lap of 1:22.479 on lap sixteen—Räikkönen and Webber both pitted on lap nineteen. Räikkönen was at a standstill for 8.3 seconds, while a slight problem with the fuel rig cost Webber valuable seconds. He was eventually released just as the Ferrari was trundling down the pit lane. The two cars just avoided a collision, which almost caused the Red Bull to career into a number of the Williams mechanics, who were standing in the pit lane at the time. Hamilton pitted the following lap, but was slightly delayed by Rosberg's Williams, which had entered the pit lane as Hamilton was about to exit the McLaren pit box. This promoted Kovalainen into the lead, followed by Vettel but both drivers pitted at the end of lap 21, to hand the lead back to Hamilton. Vettel's sluggish pit-stop cost him track position, as he filtered out behind Rosberg.

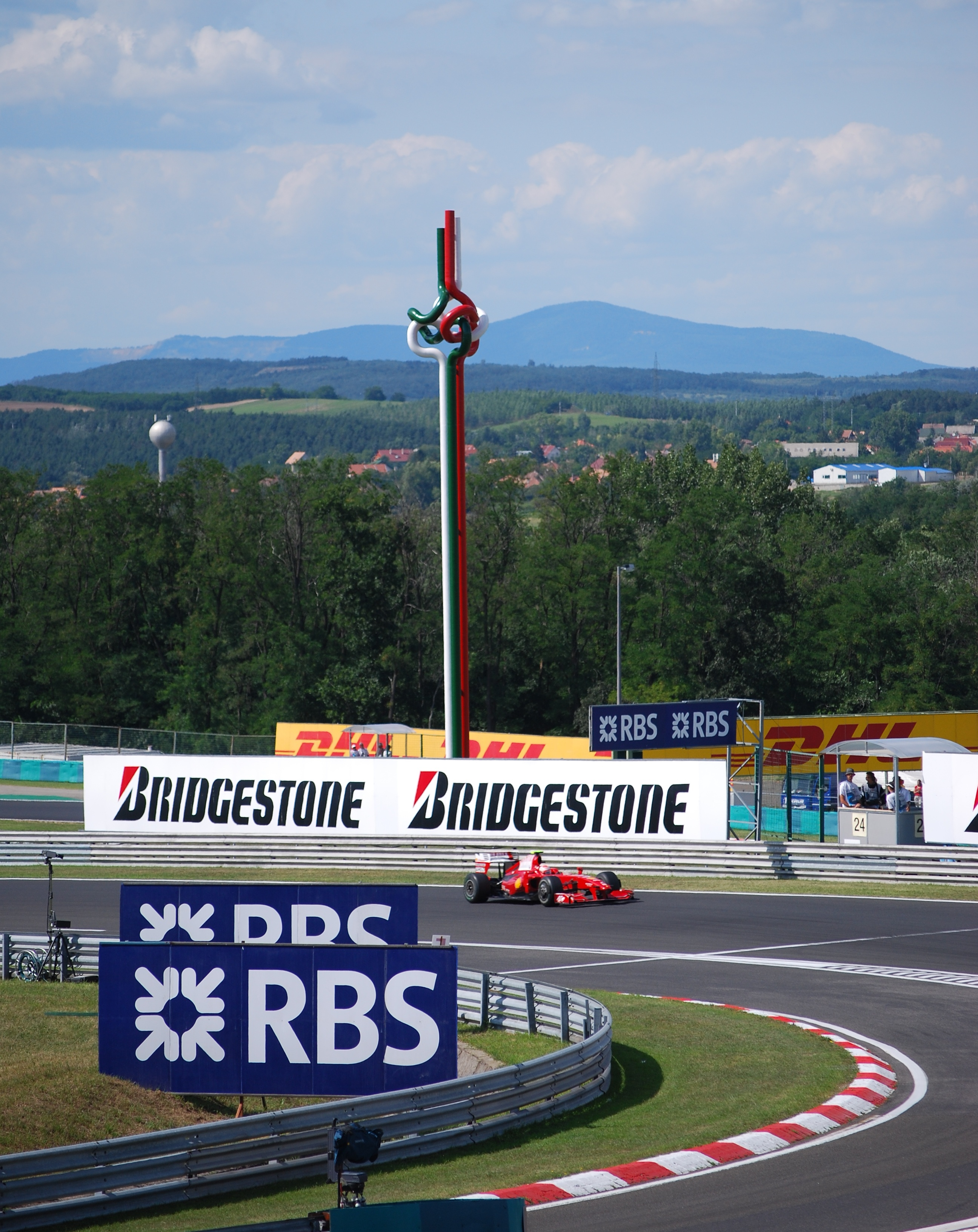
Kimi Räikkönen finished in second position in the sole Ferrari.

During Hamilton's stint on a second set of super-soft tyres, he was told by race engineer Phil Prew to look after his tyres as he had a comfortable gap of 15 seconds over Räikkönen. Championship leader Button, who was heavily fuelled at the start, had improved up to second by the time of his first stop on lap 25. Vettel was struggling with his car, and was passed for eighth position by Barrichello on lap 27. He then reported to his race engineer Guillaume Rocquelin that something was broken on his car. He pitted at the end of the lap from eleventh position, having lost more places, and his pit crew routinely replaced the nosecone and took a detailed look at the rear suspension. He rejoined a lap down before retiring on lap 30. Debutant Alguersuari made his first Formula One pit stop on lap 28, when running in thirteenth place. Glock also moved into the points-scoring positions at this stage of the race by using the strategy of a long 32-lap first stint. Buemi spun at turn two on lap 38, and subsequently rejoined the circuit behind his teammate Alguersuari.

Hamilton was left unchallenged for the rest of the race, making his final pit stop on lap 46, and came home to win his first race as World Champion. This was his first victory since the 2008 Chinese Grand Prix, his tenth in total, and also the first time that he had won at a circuit twice, having won at nine different circuits previously. This was also the first occasion on which a KERS car had won a Grand Prix; Räikkönen (in another KERS car) came in second, setting his fastest lap on the final lap. Webber finished third, a result which moved him into second in the championship standings past Vettel. Webber also recorded the first fastest lap of his career, with a lap of 1:21.931 on lap 65. Rosberg finished fourth for the third race in succession, heading home Kovalainen, Glock, Button and Trulli rounded out the top eight point scorers. Outside the point-scoring positions were Nakajima, Barrichello (the first time that a Brawn car had finished a race outside the points), Heidfeld, Piquet, Kubica, Fisichella and the Toro Rossos of Alguersuari and Buemi. With Button's seventh place, his lead in the drivers' championship over Webber was cut by four points, to 18.5 points.

=== Race classification ===
Pos	No	Driver	Constructor	Laps	Time/Retired	Grid	Points
1	1‡	(United Kingdom) Lewis Hamilton	McLaren-Mercedes	70	1:38:23.876	4	10
2	4‡	(Finland) Kimi Räikkönen	Ferrari	70	+11.529	7	8
3	14	(Australia) Mark Webber	Red Bull-Renault	70	+16.886	3	6
4	16	(Germany) Nico Rosberg	Williams-Toyota	70	+26.967	5	5
5	2‡	(Finland) Heikki Kovalainen	McLaren-Mercedes	70	+34.392	6	4
6	10	(Germany) Timo Glock	Toyota	70	+35.237	13	3
7	22	(United Kingdom) Jenson Button	Brawn-Mercedes	70	+55.088	8	2
8	9	(Italy) Jarno Trulli	Toyota	70	+1:08.172	11	1
9	17	(Japan) Kazuki Nakajima	Williams-Toyota	70	+1:08.774	9	
10	23	(Brazil) Rubens Barrichello	Brawn-Mercedes	70	+1:09.256	12	
11	6	(Germany) Nick Heidfeld	BMW Sauber	70	+1:10.612	15	
12	8	(Brazil) Nelson Piquet Jr.	Renault	70	+1:11.512	14	
13	5	(Poland) Robert Kubica	BMW Sauber	70	+1:14.046	18	
14	21	(Italy) Giancarlo Fisichella	Force India-Mercedes	69	+1 lap	16	
15	11	(Spain) Jaime Alguersuari	Toro Rosso-Ferrari	69	+1 lap	19	
16	12	(Switzerland) Sébastien Buemi	Toro Rosso-Ferrari	69	+1 lap	10	
Ret	15	(Germany) Sebastian Vettel	Red Bull-Renault	29	Suspension	2	
Ret	7	(Spain) Fernando Alonso	Renault	15	Wheel/Fuel pump	1	
Ret	20	(Germany) Adrian Sutil	Force India-Mercedes	1	Water pressure	17	
DNS	3‡	(Brazil) Felipe Massa	Ferrari	0	Accident during qualifying		

== Post-race ==
"Yeah, I was able to manage them quite well but something I want to say is that yesterday was, I think, and maybe I can speak for all of us drivers, quite a sad day to see Felipe not with us here today. Hopefully I speak on behalf of all of us when I say we miss him and wish him well and wish him a speedy recovery. But back to the car, it was just fantastic. The team asked me to look after the tyres in which through all the great experiences I have had—good or bad—I was able to apply that today, so really a big thank you to all the guys and all the fans that have always given me support and never gave me up and to all my family."

— Lewis Hamilton, reflecting on how well his car looked after its tyres, and also the previous day's events with Felipe Massa's accident.

The top three finishers appeared on the podium and in the subsequent press conference, where Hamilton was overjoyed at being back at the front of the field: "It’s an incredible feeling to be back here after what feels such a long time away and with such a struggle with me and my team. But as I said on the in lap I am just so proud of the guys, as I go into the factory and I see how hard everyone is pushing. Everyone wants to win just as much as I do and they never gave up. They have never given up which is something very rare to see in such a large group of people. I am very, very proud of them. We didn’t expect to win this weekend. Undoubtedly we have caught up quite a bit but we never felt we had the pace to win. But the car felt fantastic and it is incredibly special to get back up here, not only on the podium, but to get a win. It is amazing."

Räikkönen also achieved his best result of the 2009 season to date, but was unaware that the moves that he made at the start of the race were under investigation, to be looked at after the race.

I don’t know about the whole thing, so if you can tell me what it’s about that would be nice...I haven’t even noticed if I touched somebody. I was in-between, I think, Mark and somebody else but I don’t know what is going on. That is the first time when you told me but I didn’t feel any touching or anything, so I cannot comment on that.

Webber's podium finish moved him into second place in the championship standings. He was surprised, however, at the way proceedings played out, describing his result as "a little bit of a surprise. I think we expected to be a little bit quicker after our running on Friday but to be honest we knew these guys would be around us. It was a pretty difficult venue for us and we knew that we didn’t have the advantage maybe that we had in the last few events. All in all for me I am still pretty happy to get the result we did. I think we had a better chance to fight Kimi if maybe we did a slightly different pit stop and maybe chose a different tyre but that was my call. I was worried about how long the length of the stint was and it was quite difficult to know which tyre to put on but overall we still have a lot of positives. We are still up here. We haven’t been blown away by any means. We are in the hunt and we can take our car to a lot of venues and be competitive, so our guys and Renault have a lot to be proud of. We are still very much a force, so it is still a positive day for us."

Two hours after the race's conclusion, representatives of Ferrari, Red Bull and Renault were summoned to see the race stewards due to the various incidents that occurred during the race. Ferrari and Räikkönen were cleared of any wrongdoing in either of his incidents with race-winner Hamilton and Vettel on the first lap of the race. Red Bull were given a reprimand for the second race running, due to the unsafe release of Webber into the direct path of Räikkönen in the pit lane, at the first round of pit stops. Red Bull had been in a similar situation at the German Grand Prix, when Vettel was released unsafely into the path of Kazuki Nakajima during qualifying, and the team were given a €10,000 fine. Renault received the harshest punishment of the three incidents, in the form of a suspension from the next race of the season, the European Grand Prix. The race stewards felt that Renault "knowingly released car no. 7 [Alonso] from the pitstop position without one of the retaining devices for the wheel-nuts being securely in position, this being an indication that the wheel itself may not have been properly secured. Being aware of this, [Renault] failed to take any action to prevent the car from leaving the pitlane. [Renault] failed to inform the driver of this problem or to advise him to take appropriate action given the circumstances, even though the driver contacted the team by radio believing he had a puncture, resulting in a heavy car part detaching at Turn 5, and the wheel itself detaching at Turn 9." which was in breach of Articles 3.2 and 23.1.i in the Sporting Regulations. Within half an hour of the decision, Renault filed the mandatory cost of €6,000 to appeal against the decision. The International Court of Appeal heard the case on 17 August; the Monday before the European Grand Prix and the court upheld bid for the suspension to be overturned. The team was fined $50,000 for the breach of the regulations in Hungary, and were allowed to race at Valencia.

"I don't remember anything and that's why what the doctors did had to be explained to me. When I saw Rob [Smedley], he asked me if I remembered Rubens, but the last thing I remembered was when I was behind him at the end of my fast lap in Q2, and then it's blank. It's difficult to explain. I'm feeling much better now and I want to recover as soon as possible to get back behind the wheel of a Ferrari."

— Felipe Massa, in his first interview following the accident.

Massa's condition continued to improve over the course of the weekend, the Brazilian having been sedated in a coma for 48 hours. After being visited by Ferrari and Fiat president Luca Cordero di Montezemolo and also Rubens Barrichello, doctors from the Állami Egészségügyi Központ military hospital released a statement saying that Massa could make a full recovery. Massa could be released from hospital within a week to ten days, depending on how well he progresses. Massa's doctor, Dino Altmann, also told the media that he is certain that Massa will race again, having stated that the trauma suffered by the Brazilian was not as bad as first thought, and that his condition has improved rapidly, taking his first steps since the crash, when he left the intensive care unit. Massa left hospital on 3 August, returning home to Brazil to recuperate. He checked into the Sociedade Beneficente Israelita Brasileira Hospital Albert Einstein in São Paulo for a series of medical tests that would allow him to recuperate at home, rather than in hospital. All the results of the tests for abnormalities came back negative, and Massa was given the all-clear to continue his recuperation.

"Whoever sits in the car at the next race in Valencia, it will not be Michael Schumacher. I am not 100 per cent sure; I am 200 per cent sure. The pressure on him would be huge. He would be expected to win, but he has not driven this car. When Michael was racing he would get as close to perfection as possible. In this case, it would not be perfection; it would be a gamble—and that's not Michael's style."

— Willi Weber, on rumours that Michael Schumacher would be replacing Massa.

Rumours began circulating that any one out of Ferrari advisor Michael Schumacher, and the team's two test drivers Luca Badoer and Marc Gené would be replacing Massa for the European Grand Prix, and the succeeding events. On 29 July, Schumacher agreed to drive the car until Massa was fit enough to return, subject to medical tests. However, Schumacher called off his return on 11 August, due to a lingering neck injury which he had suffered six months earlier, while testing a Honda CBR1000RR motorcycle at Circuito Cartagena. Badoer replaced Massa in Valencia, and competed in his first Grand Prix since 1999. The gap of nine years, nine months and 24 days was the second-longest gap between Grands Prix competed, with only Jan Lammers (ten years, three months; when he returned to Formula One in 1992), having a lengthier spell between races.

The Hungarian Grand Prix was also the last race for Renault's Nelson Piquet Jr. as he parted company with the team on 3 August 2009 and he would not race in a Formula One Grand Prix again. Romain Grosjean was announced as his replacement, with his GP2 Series team Barwa Addax signing up Davide Valsecchi to replace him; ending his title aspirations.

== Championship standings after the race ==
Drivers' Championship standings

	Pos.	Driver	Points
	1	(United Kingdom) Jenson Button	70
1	2	(Australia) Mark Webber	51.5
1	3	(Germany) Sebastian Vettel	47
	4	(Brazil) Rubens Barrichello	44
2	5	(Germany) Nico Rosberg	25.5

Constructors' Championship standings

	Pos.	Constructor	Points
	1	(United Kingdom) Brawn-Mercedes	114
	2	(Austria) Red Bull-Renault	98.5
1	3	(Italy) Ferrari	40
1	4	(Japan) Toyota	38.5
1	5	(United Kingdom) McLaren-Mercedes	28

- Note: Only the top five positions are included for both sets of standings.

== See also ==
- 2009 Hungaroring GP2 Series round

Previous race: 2009 German Grand Prix	FIA Formula One World Championship; 2009 season	Next race: 2009 European Grand Prix
Previous race: 2008 Hungarian Grand Prix	Hungarian Grand Prix	Next race: 2010 Hungarian Grand Prix
