= 2009 German Grand Prix =

Race 9 of 17 in the 2009 Formula One World Championship
← Previous race	Next race →

Race details
- Date: 12 July 2009
- Official name: Formula 1 Grosser Preis Santander von Deutschland 2009
- Location: Nürburgring, Nürburg, Germany
- Course: Permanent racing facility
- Course length: 5.148 km (3.199 miles)
- Distance: 60 laps, 308.863 km (191.919 miles)
- Weather: Sunny and overcast

Pole position
Driver	(Australia) Mark Webber	Red Bull-Renault
- Time: 1:32.230

Fastest lap
Driver	(Spain) Fernando Alonso	Renault
- Time: 1:33.365 on lap 49

Podium
First	(Australia) Mark Webber	Red Bull-Renault
Second	(Germany) Sebastian Vettel	Red Bull-Renault
Third	(Brazil) Felipe Massa	Ferrari

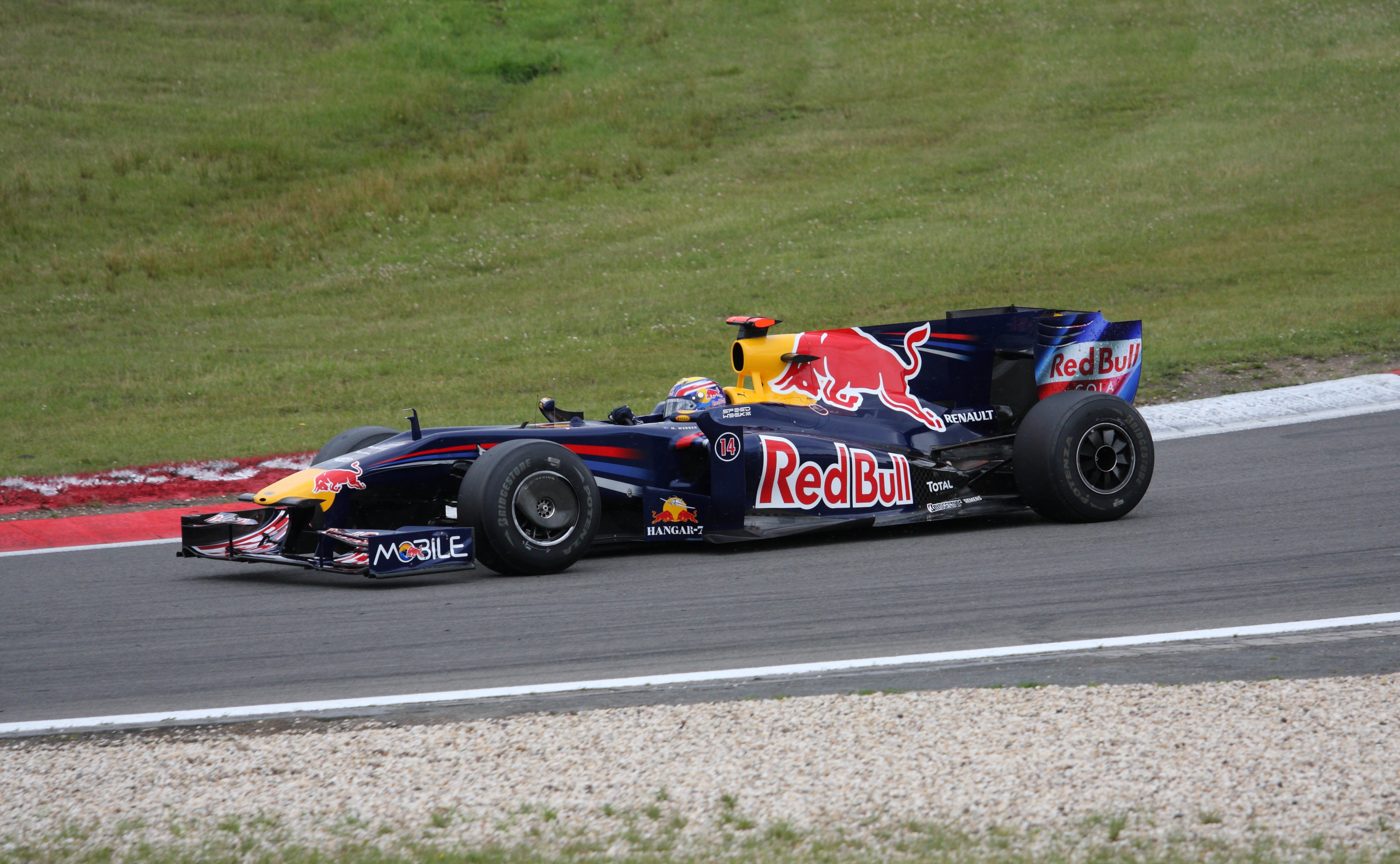
Mark Webber took his first career win, winning from pole position despite a drive-through penalty.

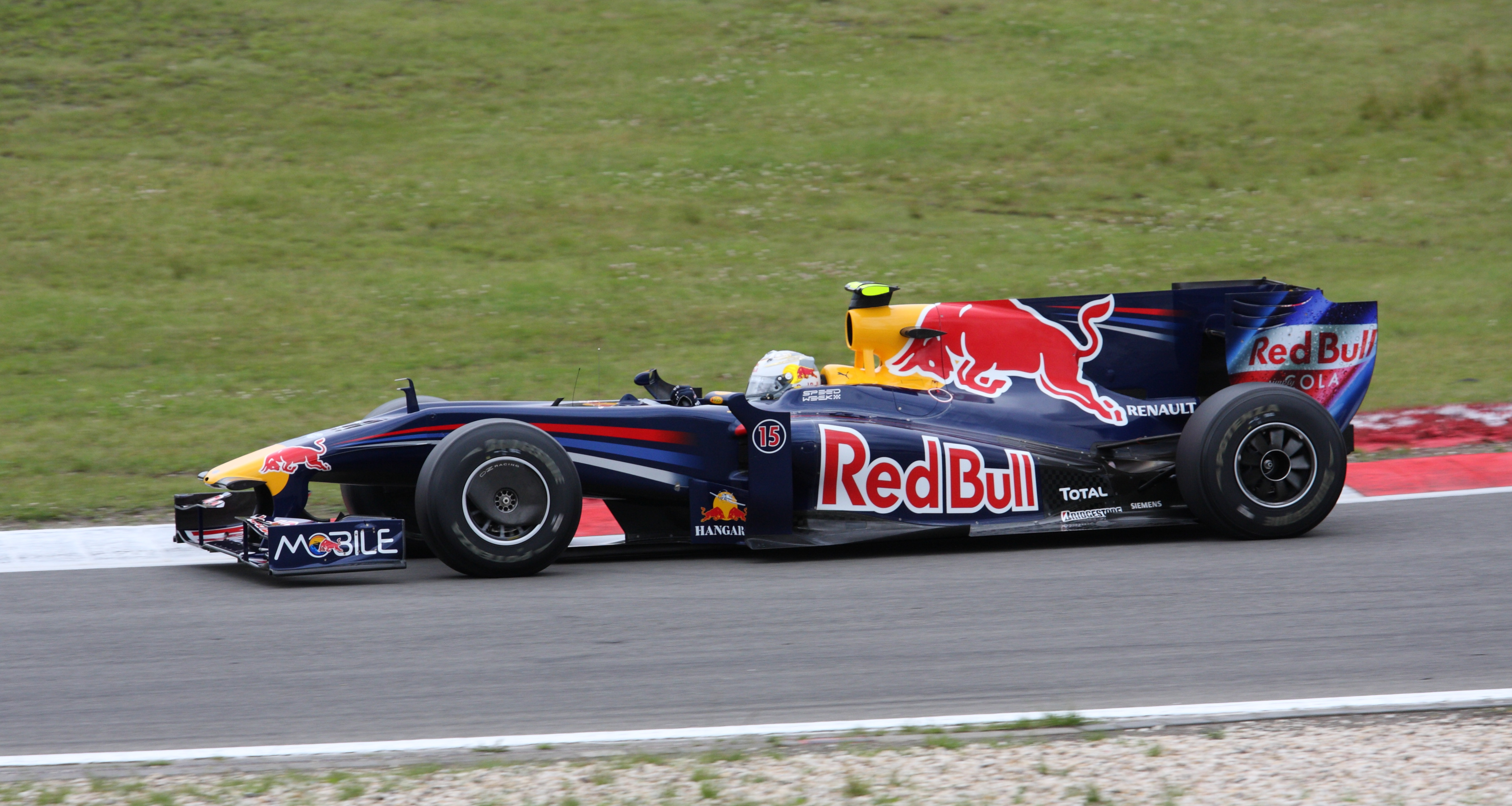
Sebastian Vettel finished second in the race, moving into second place in the championship standings.

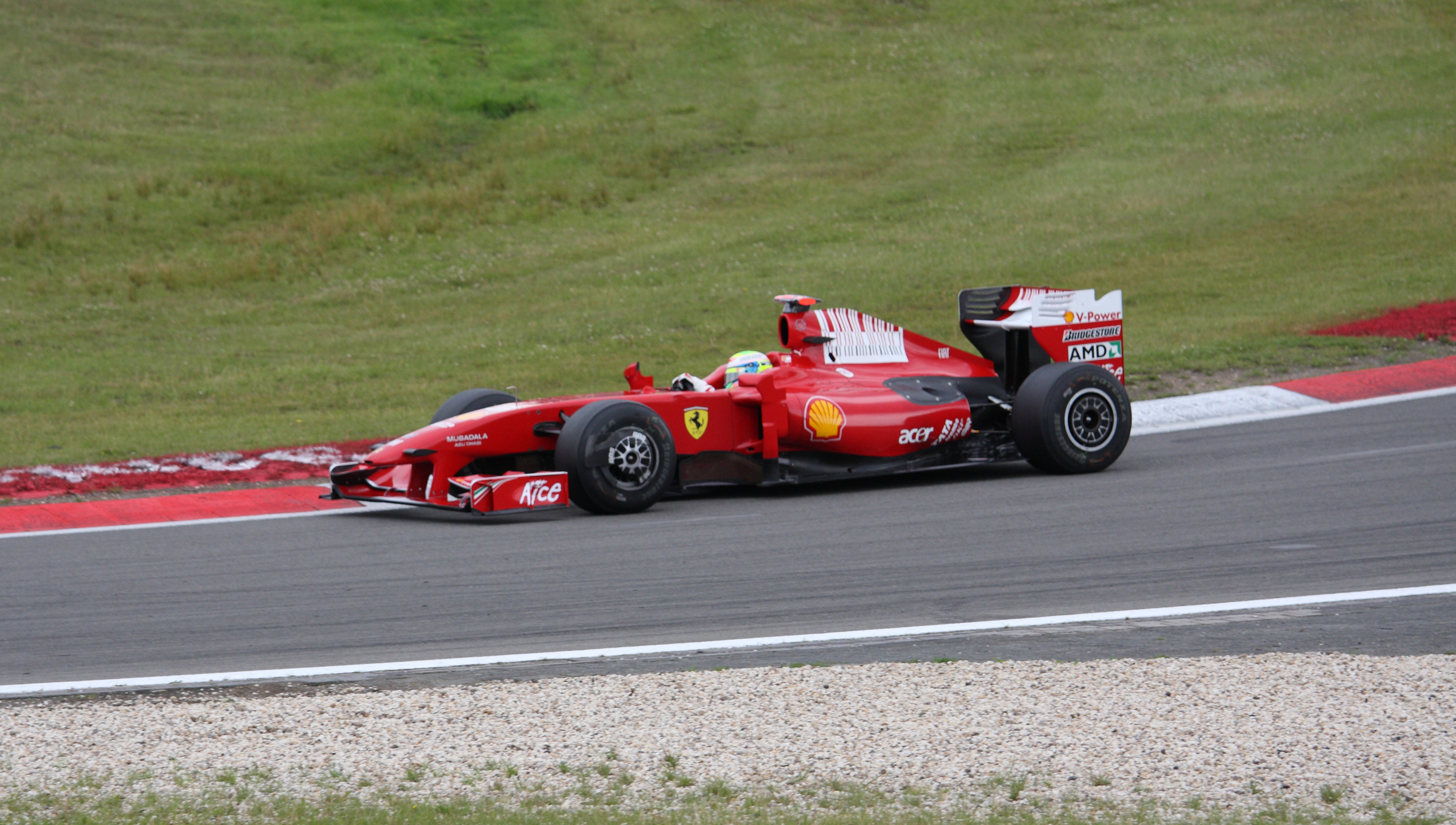
Felipe Massa finished third in the race, his first and only podium of 2009.

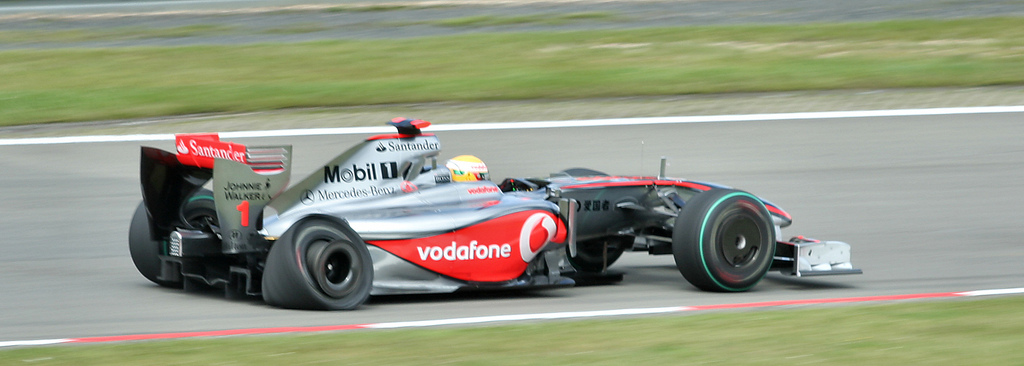
Lewis Hamilton qualified and started strongly, but suffered a puncture on the opening lap as a result of contact with Webber.

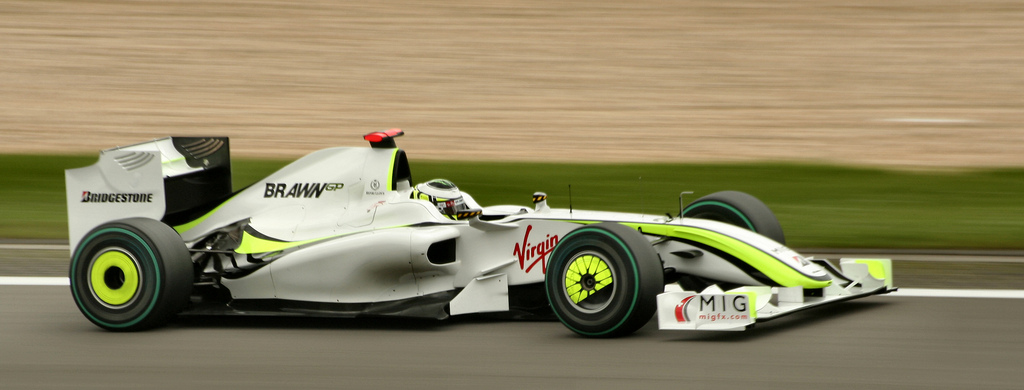
Jenson Button qualified 3rd and finished 5th, but managed to retain his lead of the Driver's Championship.

The 2009 German Grand Prix (officially the Formula 1 Grosser Preis Santander von Deutschland 2009) was the ninth race of the 2009 Formula One season. It was held on 12 July 2009 at the Nürburgring in Nürburg, Germany; the earliest German Grand Prix on the calendar (a feat since beat by the 2013 race), since 1926.

Australian Mark Webber took both his first pole position and his first Grand Prix win, with Sebastian Vettel coming in second, giving Red Bull their third 1-2 of 2009. Championship leader Jenson Button could only manage fifth. This was the last race for Toro Rosso driver Sébastien Bourdais who was dropped in favour of test driver Jaime Alguersuari for the Hungarian Grand Prix.

== Report ==
=== Background ===
In the lead-up to the race, despite 6th place at the British Grand Prix, Jenson Button maintained a 23-point lead over Brawn GP teammate Rubens Barrichello in the Drivers' Championship. Barrichello was 2 points further in front of Red Bull Racing's Sebastian Vettel, winner of the British Grand Prix. Brawn GP had a sizeable lead of 30.5 points in the Constructors' Championship with Red Bull Racing in second place. Toyota were 30 points behind the Austrian Red Bull team, with only Force India yet to score a point. The three former World Champions in the F1 field, Fernando Alonso, Kimi Räikkönen and Lewis Hamilton were 9th, 10th and 11th in the Championship, with 11, 10 and 9 points respectively.

2008 champion Lewis Hamilton won the 2008 German Grand Prix for McLaren-Mercedes, at Hockenheim. Former German Grand Prix winners in the field for 2009 include Fernando Alonso of Renault and Rubens Barrichello of Brawn GP. Barrichello and Alonso have also been successful at the Nürburgring when the circuit hosted the European Grand Prix.

The Nürburgring has the unique honour of hosting four different Formula One Grands Prix: the German Grand Prix on the old track in the 1950s, 60s and 70s as well as on the GP track in 1985 and on the revised circuit in 2009; the European Grand Prix in 1984 and from 1995 to 2007, with the exception of 1997 and 1998, when it was the Luxembourg Grand Prix. Most recently, F1 raced at the Nürburgring in 2020 for the Eifel Grand Prix, as part of a revised calendar due to Covid-19.

=== Practice and Qualifying ===
Qualifying saw drivers switch strategies to using wet weather tyres due to the rain and wet track. The track was dry as the drivers headed out for the first session. This yielded no surprises as the two Toro Rossos of Sébastien Buemi and Sébastien Bourdais were eliminated along with Giancarlo Fisichella's Force India, and the consistently underperforming Toyota of Timo Glock and BMW Sauber of Robert Kubica. Glock was later given a three place grid drop for blocking Renault's Fernando Alonso, but since he qualified 19th anyway this sent him to the back of the grid.

In the second session, the rain began to fall. This gave us some more interesting results, with both Williams cars going out. Both Nico Rosberg and Kazuki Nakajima said that they would have done better had it not been for the rain. They were joined in elimination by Alonso, Jarno Trulli's Toyota and Nick Heidfeld, who did well to qualify 11th in the other BMW Sauber. The German claimed he could have done even better, but the rain upset his strategy as well.

Nelson Piquet Jr. in the other Renault made the final session for the first time in 2009, but only managed 10th as the rain eased off again in the last ten minutes. The Ferraris of Felipe Massa and Kimi Räikkönen were disappointing, only managing 8th and 9th respectively. Räikkönen's race engineer Chris Dyer said that they didn't have any soft tyres left for the last qualifying lap, which cost them very dear. Adrian Sutil did excellently in the Force India to qualify not only in the top 10 for the first time, but ahead of the Ferraris in 7th. The McLarens of Lewis Hamilton and Heikki Kovalainen came 5th and 6th respectively, and both thanked the upgrades to the car for their improved performances.

Then came the fight for pole, which was solely between the four championship contenders - the Brawns of Jenson Button and Rubens Barrichello and the Red Bulls of Sebastian Vettel and Mark Webber. Webber was the first to cross the line in 1:32.230. Then Vettel did well to do 1:32.480, but it was a surprise for him to be beaten by his teammate. This looked to be the order, but Barrichello and Button both crossed the line in the dying seconds to split the Red Bulls, so Webber claimed the first pole position of his career. He described it as a "special day".

=== Race ===
Mark Webber and Rubens Barrichello were side by side coming to the first corner where Webber clashed wheels with the Brazilian, for which he later received a drive-through penalty. The Brawn driver still managed to jump the Red Bull driver to take the lead. Lewis Hamilton also made a fast start in the McLaren and challenged for the lead, but he made slight contact with Webber at the first corner and received a puncture, ending his chance for points. He lost a lap in the pits, ultimately finishing 18th, still one lap down. Jarno Trulli also collided with Kazuki Nakajima's Williams at the first corner, and the Italian had to pit for a new nosecone for his Toyota, leaving him at the back of the field with Hamilton.

Webber retook the lead on lap 15 as Barrichello pitted and soon after pitted but returned in the lead, which was a good job as he pitted again for the drive through penalty soon after that, which dropped him to eighth. This left Felipe Massa in the lead in the Ferrari followed by Barrichello and Kimi Räikkönen.

Bourdais retired due to hydraulic problems on his lap 19, in what would ultimately be his final race at Scuderia Toro Rosso. Adrian Sutil in the Force India climbed into second before his first pitstop, but as he emerged from the pits he collided with Räikkönen's Ferrari. The German had to pit again for a new nosecone, and lost several places.

Barrichello retook the lead after Massa's pitstop, but lost it again to an impressively recovering Webber in the second stops. Teammate Sebastian Vettel also briefly led before everything settled down with Webber in the lead.

Räikkönen retired with a radiator problem on lap 35, briefly promoting Giancarlo Fisichella into the points, but the Italian failed to score his first points for Force India, as his pitstop allowed former teammate Fernando Alonso into the points in his Renault.

Alonso made a late charge as Jenson Button and Rubens Barrichello struggled for grip, but he could not find a way past. Despite the drive through penalty for impeding Barrichello on the first lap, Webber came home to claim his maiden victory and become this first Australian winner in almost thirty years. He was followed home by Vettel, who was over nine seconds behind. Massa came home a distant but impressive third, his first and only podium of the year as he was injured during qualifying for the next race and didn't race again for the rest of the season. Jenson Button had managed to jump teammate Barrichello during the second stops and came home fifth with the Brazilian very close behind, and also closely followed by Alonso. The Spaniard had made a charge in the closing stages but was unable to find a way past the Brawns, despite setting the race's faster lap, who were struggling for grip. Heikki Kovalainen occupied the final points paying position in an ultimately disappointing race for McLaren.

Webber said it was an "incredible day" for him, and his sentiments were echoed by Red Bull sporting director Christian Horner, who described his team's 1-2 finish as a "brilliant team performance". Webber's win was the first for an Australian driver since 1980 World Champion Alan Jones won the 1981 Caesars Palace Grand Prix.

== Classification ==
Cars that used KERS are marked with "‡"

=== Qualifying ===
Pos	No	Driver	Constructor	Part 1	Part 2	Part 3	Grid
1	14	(Australia) Mark Webber	Red Bull-Renault	1:31.257	1:38.038	1:32.230	1
2	23	(Brazil) Rubens Barrichello	Brawn-Mercedes	1:31.482	1:34.455	1:32.357	2
3	22	(United Kingdom) Jenson Button	Brawn-Mercedes	1:31.568	1:39.032	1:32.473	3
4	15	(Germany) Sebastian Vettel	Red Bull-Renault	1:31.430	1:39.504	1:32.480	4
5	1‡	(United Kingdom) Lewis Hamilton	McLaren-Mercedes	1:31.473	1:39.149	1:32.616	5
6	2‡	(Finland) Heikki Kovalainen	McLaren-Mercedes	1:31.881	1:40.826	1:33.859	6
7	20	(Germany) Adrian Sutil	Force India-Mercedes	1:32.015	1:36.740	1:34.316	7
8	3‡	(Brazil) Felipe Massa	Ferrari	1:31.600	1:41.708	1:34.574	8
9	4‡	(Finland) Kimi Räikkönen	Ferrari	1:31.869	1:41.730	1:34.710	9
10	8	(Brazil) Nelson Piquet Jr.	Renault	1:32.128	1:35.737	1:34.803	10
11	6	(Germany) Nick Heidfeld	BMW Sauber	1:31.771	1:42.310		11
12	7	(Spain) Fernando Alonso	Renault	1:31.302	1:42.318		12
13	17	(Japan) Kazuki Nakajima	Williams-Toyota	1:31.884	1:42.500		13
14	9	(Italy) Jarno Trulli	Toyota	1:31.760	1:42.771		14
15	16	(Germany) Nico Rosberg	Williams-Toyota	1:31.598	1:42.859		15
16	5	(Poland) Robert Kubica	BMW Sauber	1:32.190			16
17	12	(Switzerland) Sébastien Buemi	Toro Rosso-Ferrari	1:32.251			17
18	21	(Italy) Giancarlo Fisichella	Force India-Mercedes	1:32.402			18
19	10	(Germany) Timo Glock	Toyota	1:32.423			20^{1}
20	11	(France) Sébastien Bourdais	Toro Rosso-Ferrari	1:33.559			19

Notes

- ^1 – Timo Glock received a 3 place grid-penalty for obstructing Fernando Alonso. As he was already 19th on the grid, he was sent to the rear.

=== Race ===
Pos	No	Driver	Constructor	Laps	Time/Retired	Grid	Points
1	14	(Australia) Mark Webber	Red Bull-Renault	60	1:36:43.310	1	10
2	15	(Germany) Sebastian Vettel	Red Bull-Renault	60	+9.252	4	8
3	3‡	(Brazil) Felipe Massa	Ferrari	60	+15.906	8	6
4	16	(Germany) Nico Rosberg	Williams-Toyota	60	+21.099	15	5
5	22	(United Kingdom) Jenson Button	Brawn-Mercedes	60	+23.609	3	4
6	23	(Brazil) Rubens Barrichello	Brawn-Mercedes	60	+24.468	2	3
7	7	(Spain) Fernando Alonso	Renault	60	+24.888	12	2
8	2	(Finland) Heikki Kovalainen	McLaren-Mercedes	60	+58.692	6	1
9	10	(Germany) Timo Glock	Toyota	60	+1:01.457	PL^{2}	
10	6	(Germany) Nick Heidfeld	BMW Sauber	60	+1:01.925	11	
11	21	(Italy) Giancarlo Fisichella	Force India-Mercedes	60	+1:02.327	18	
12	17	(Japan) Kazuki Nakajima	Williams-Toyota	60	+1:02.876	13	
13	8	(Brazil) Nelson Piquet Jr.	Renault	60	+1:08.328	10	
14	5	(Poland) Robert Kubica	BMW Sauber	60	+1:09.555	16	
15	20	(Germany) Adrian Sutil	Force India-Mercedes	60	+1:11.941	7	
16	12	(Switzerland) Sébastien Buemi	Toro Rosso-Ferrari	60	+1:30.225	17	
17	9	(Italy) Jarno Trulli	Toyota	60	+1:30.970	14	
18	1	(United Kingdom) Lewis Hamilton	McLaren-Mercedes	59	+1 lap	5	
Ret	4‡	(Finland) Kimi Räikkönen	Ferrari	34	Radiator	9	
Ret	11	(France) Sébastien Bourdais	Toro Rosso-Ferrari	18	Hydraulics	19	

Notes

- ^2 – Timo Glock started the race from the pit lane.

== Championship standings after the race ==
Drivers' Championship standings

	Pos.	Driver	Points
	1	(United Kingdom) Jenson Button	68
1	2	(Germany) Sebastian Vettel	47
1	3	(Australia) Mark Webber	45.5
2	4	(Brazil) Rubens Barrichello	44
1	5	(Brazil) Felipe Massa	22

Constructors' Championship standings

Pos.	Constructor	Points
1	(United Kingdom) Brawn-Mercedes	112
2	(Austria) Red Bull-Renault	92.5
3	(Japan) Toyota	34.5
4	(Italy) Ferrari	32
5	(United Kingdom) Williams-Toyota	20.5

- Note: Only the top five positions are included for both sets of standings.

== See also ==
- 2009 Nürburgring GP2 Series round

Previous race: 2009 British Grand Prix	FIA Formula One World Championship; 2009 season	Next race: 2009 Hungarian Grand Prix
Previous race: 2008 German Grand Prix; Previous race at the Nürburgring: 2007 European Grand Prix	German Grand Prix	Next race: 2010 German Grand Prix
