= 2008 Hungarian Grand Prix =

Formula One motor race

Race 11 of 18 in the 2008 Formula One World Championship
← Previous race	Next race →
- Hungaroring (GP track)

Race details
- Date: 3 August 2008
- Official name: Formula 1 ING Magyar Nagydíj 2008
- Location: Hungaroring, Mogyoród, near Budapest, Hungary
- Course: Permanent racing facility
- Course length: 4.381 km (2.722 miles)
- Distance: 70 laps, 306.630 km (190.531 miles)
- Weather: Sunny; Air 30–31 °C (86–88 °F), Track 40–43 °C (104–109 °F)
- Attendance: 84,000

Pole position
Driver	(United Kingdom) Lewis Hamilton	McLaren-Mercedes
- Time: 1:20.899

Fastest lap
Driver	(Finland) Kimi Räikkönen	Ferrari
- Time: 1:21.195 on lap 61

Podium
First	(Finland) Heikki Kovalainen	McLaren-Mercedes
Second	(Germany) Timo Glock	Toyota
Third	(Finland) Kimi Räikkönen	Ferrari

The 2008 Hungarian Grand Prix (formally the Formula 1 ING Magyar Nagydíj 2008) was a Formula One motor race held on 3 August 2008, at the Hungaroring in Mogyoród, near Budapest, Hungary. It was the 11th race of the 2008 Formula One World Championship. Contested over 70 laps, the race was won by Heikki Kovalainen for the McLaren team, from a second position start. Timo Glock finished second in a Toyota car, with Kimi Räikkönen third in a Ferrari. It was Kovalainen's first Formula One victory, which made him the sport's 100th driver to win a World Championship race, and it was Glock's first podium finish. It also turned out to be the only F1 race Kovalainen ever won.

The majority of the race consisted of a duel between Lewis Hamilton and Felipe Massa, who drove for McLaren and Ferrari, respectively. Hamilton started from pole position but was beaten at the first corner by Massa, who passed him around the outside. The two championship rivals began a battle for the lead that was resolved when Hamilton sustained a punctured tyre just over halfway through the race, giving Massa a lead of more than 20 seconds over Kovalainen. The Ferrari's engine, however, failed with three laps remaining, allowing the McLaren driver to win. Räikkönen set the race's fastest lap in the other Ferrari, but was hampered by a poor qualifying performance and was stuck behind Fernando Alonso (Renault) and Glock in turn for almost all of the race.

As a consequence of the race, Hamilton extended his lead in the World Drivers' Championship to five points over Räikkönen, with Massa a further three behind. Robert Kubica, who finished eighth after finding his BMW Sauber car uncompetitive at the Hungaroring, slipped to 13 points behind Hamilton, ahead of teammate Nick Heidfeld and Kovalainen. In the World Constructors' Championship, McLaren passed BMW Sauber for second position, 11 points behind Ferrari.

== Background ==
The 2008 Hungarian Grand Prix was the 11th of the 18th rounds of the 2008 Formula One World Championship and occurred at the 4.381 km (2.722 mi) Hungaroring circuit, in Mogyoród, Hungary, on 3 August 2008. The Grand Prix was contested by 20 drivers in ten teams of two. The teams, also known as "constructors", were Ferrari, McLaren-Mercedes, Renault, Honda, Force India-Ferrari, BMW Sauber, Toyota, Red Bull-Renault, Williams-Toyota and Toro Rosso-Ferrari. Before the race, Ferrari was in the lead of the Constructors' Championship with 105 points, 16 ahead of BMW Sauber and a further three in front of McLaren. Vying for fourth place were Toyota, Red Bull and Renault, all within two points of each other but more than 60 points behind McLaren. In the Drivers' Championship, Lewis Hamilton (McLaren) led with 58 points, ahead of Ferrari teammates Felipe Massa and Kimi Räikkönen, who were on 54 and 51 points respectively. BMW drivers Robert Kubica (48) and Nick Heidfeld (41) were fourth and fifth in the championship, followed by Heikki Kovalainen, who had scored 28 points in the second McLaren.

Following the German Grand Prix on July 20, the teams conducted testing sessions at the Jerez circuit from July 22–25. Each team was limited to 30,000 km (19,000 mi) of testing during the 2008 calendar year, a reduction compared with previous seasons. Sebastian Vettel (Toro Rosso) set the fastest time of the first and second days, while Mark Webber (Red Bull) topped the third day's running, and Heikki Kovalainen was fastest on the final day of testing. Several teams tested using Bridgestone slick tyres, as preparation for the switch from grooved to slick tyres for the 2009 season, and BMW Sauber tested a Kinetic Energy Recovery System, also for the following year. Among the other teams, Force India's test driver, Vitantonio Liuzzi, tested the team's new "seamless-shift" gearbox ahead of the system's race début later in the year, while Timo Glock of Toyota took part after a heavy crash at the German Grand Prix.

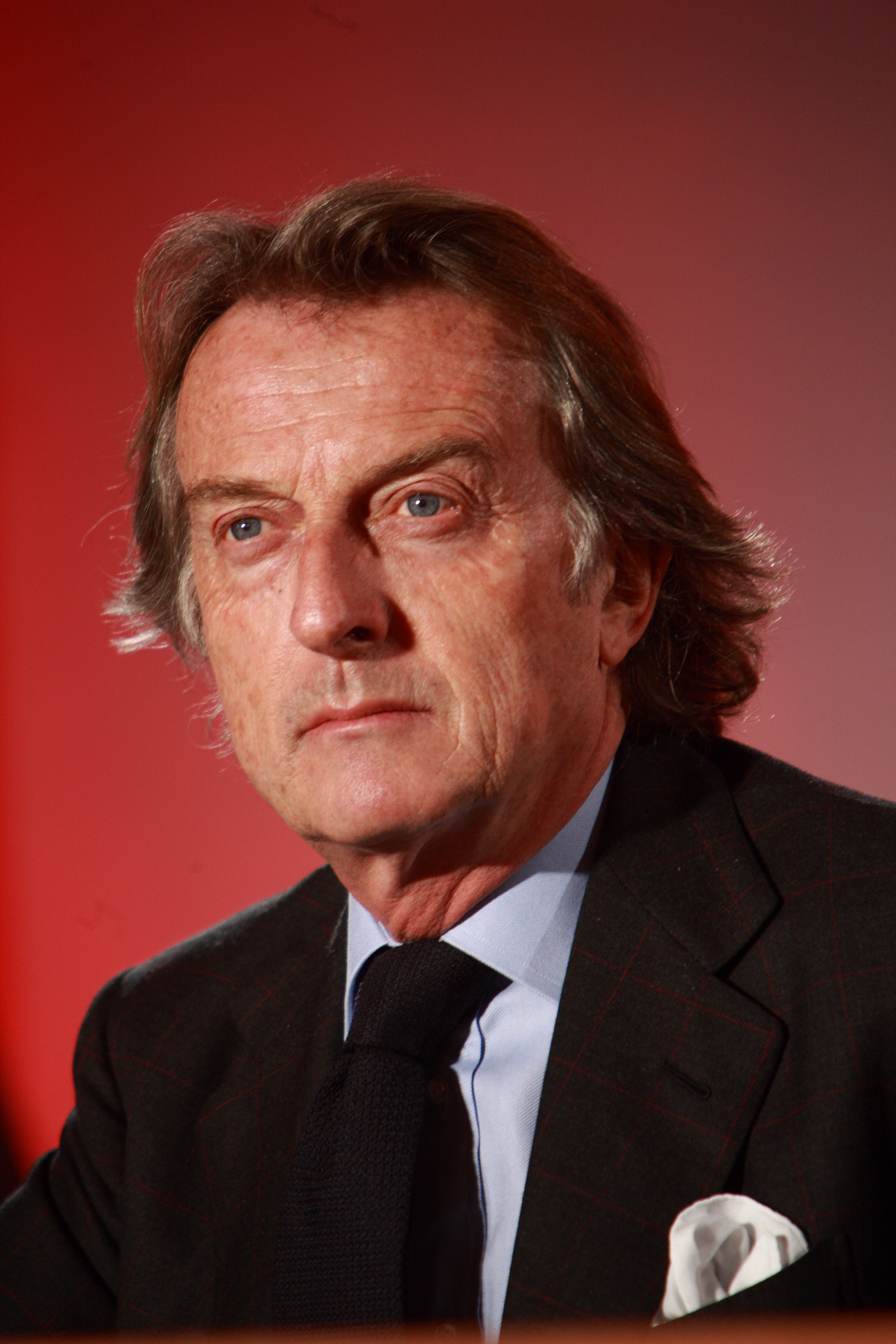
Ferrari chairman Luca di Montezemolo founded the Formula One Teams Association (FOTA) in the week before the race.

In the week leading up to the race, a meeting between the teams at Ferrari's headquarters in Maranello resulted in the formation of a new representative body, the Formula One Teams Association (FOTA), which was led by Ferrari president Luca di Montezemolo. McLaren team principal Ron Dennis said the establishment of FOTA was intended to encourage greater co-operation between the teams, particularly in framing new sporting and technical regulations, and to act as a counterweight to the sport's existing governing body, the Fédération Internationale de l'Automobile (FIA) and the company responsible for its commercial management, Formula One Management (FOM).

On July 31, the day before the event's first free practice sessions took place, McLaren confirmed the team would retain Kovalainen for 2009 alongside Hamilton, while the organisers of the Hungarian Grand Prix signed a deal with Bernie Ecclestone, the president of FOM, to continue hosting the race until 2016.

Several teams made technical changes to their cars for the Grand Prix. Ferrari altered the F2008 chassis's cooling system and bodywork following high brake wear and engine water temperatures at the German Grand Prix. McLaren and Force India introduced revised aerodynamic packages for their MP4-23 and VJM01 chassis, aimed at increasing the amount of downforce, and therefore grip, produced by the bodywork. Force India also brought its seamless-shift gearbox to the event. Ferrari, Honda and Toyota also débuted raised engine covers, nicknamed "shark-fins" for the way they stretched toward the rear wing, and Honda introduced a new rear suspension package.

The sport's sole tyre supplier, Bridgestone, provided two specifications of grooved dry tyres for the race, designated Soft (also referred to as the "prime" tyre) and Super Soft (also referred to as the "option" tyre). The Super Soft compound was distinguished by a white stripe in one of the tyre's grooves. As was the case for all of the 2008 Grands Prix, the rules stipulated that all cars should use both types of tyre during the course of the race, and each driver was limited to seven sets of dry tyres for the weekend.

== Practice ==
Three practice sessions were held before the Sunday race—two on Friday from 10:00 to 11:30 and 14:00 to 15:30 local time, and a third on Saturday morning between 11:00 and 12:00. The first practice session took place in dry conditions. The ambient temperature was between 27–28 °C (81–82 °F), and the track temperature ranged from 31–34 °C (88–93 °F) during the hour-long period. Massa set the session's fastest time with a lap of 1 minute and 20.981 seconds, almost four-tenths of a second ahead of his teammate Räikkönen. The two McLaren drivers were third and fourth, Kovalainen ahead of Hamilton. Fernando Alonso and Nelson Piquet Jr. set the fifth and eighth-fastest times respectively for Renault; they were separated by Glock and Kubica. Their teammates, Heidfeld and Toyota driver Jarno Trulli, completed the top ten. Vettel's Toro Rosso car was afflicted by a hydraulics problem; this restricted him to completing only four timed laps, and he was slowest overall.

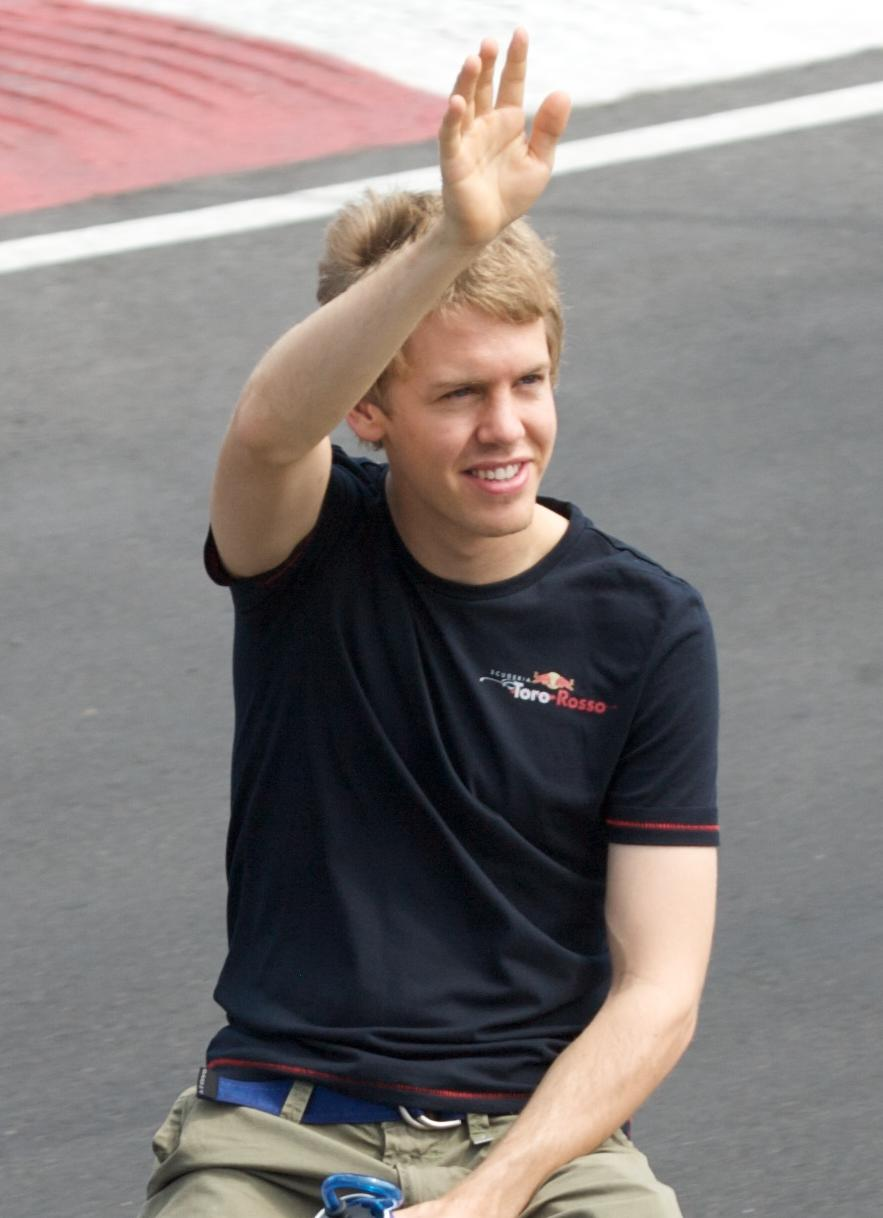
Sebastian Vettel completed minimal running during the Friday practice sessions due to a recurring problem with his Toro Rosso car's hydraulic system.

The second practice session was held in similar weather to the first; the only difference was a slightly higher peak track temperature of 37 °C (99 °F). During this session, Hamilton set the quickest lap time of the day, a 1:20.554; Kovalainen finished with the third-fastest time. The Renault drivers were again quick—Piquet in second and Alonso fourth—although the team's Executive Director of Engineering, Pat Symonds, admitted both cars were running with slightly lower fuel loads than normal, improving their performance. Räikkönen and Massa slipped to fifth and sixth respectively, their best times one-thousandth of a second apart. They were ahead of Heidfeld, Kubica, Trulli and Williams driver Nico Rosberg. Vettel's car was still suffering from the hydraulics problem and he completed just five laps, again setting the slowest time of the session.

Saturday's weather was again dry for the third and final practice session, with ambient temperature between 27–29 °C (81–84 °F) and track temperature from 32–36 °C (90–97 °F). Hamilton again set the fastest time, a 1:20.228, quicker than his best on Friday. This put him immediately ahead of Massa, Glock, Kovalainen and Piquet. Heidfeld was much happier with the setup of his car and set the sixth-fastest time, but Kubica suffered a mechanical problem that restricted him to 18th position. Vettel had a trouble-free session and set the eighth-fastest time, one position behind teammate Sébastien Bourdais. Räikkönen and Rosberg completed the top ten ahead of qualifying.

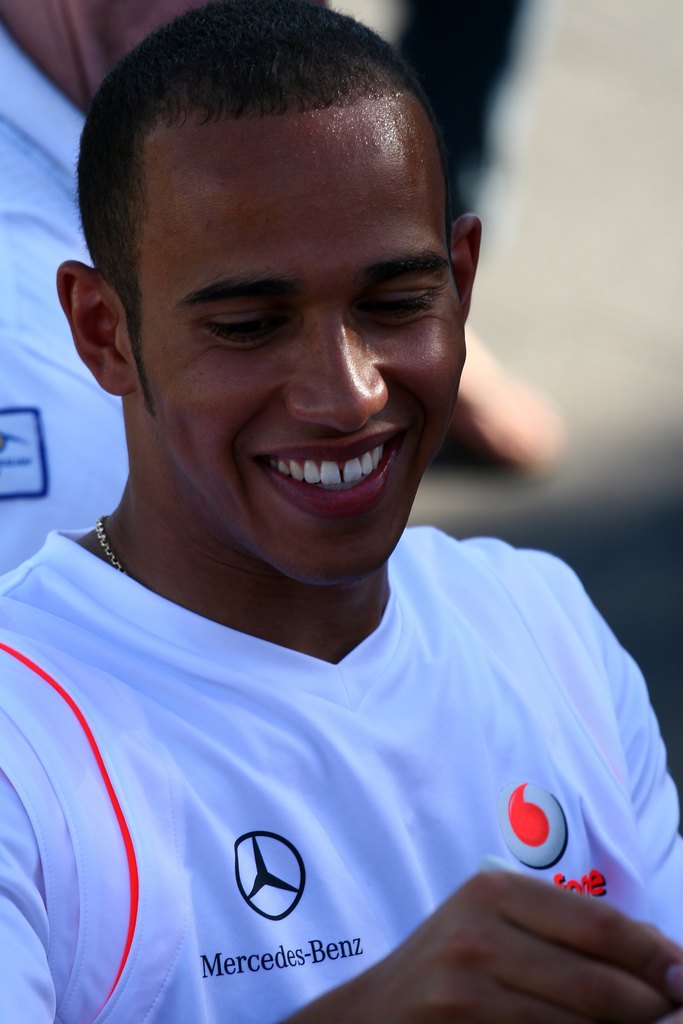
Lewis Hamilton took his fourth pole position of the season, and the tenth of his career.

== Qualifying ==
Saturday afternoon's qualifying session was divided into three parts. In the first 20-minute period, cars finishing 16th or lower were eliminated. The second qualifying period lasted 15 minutes, at the end of which the fastest 10 cars went into the final period to determine their grid positions for the race. Cars failing to make the final period were allowed to be refuelled before the race, but those competing in it were not and carried more fuel than they had done in the earlier qualifying sessions to see them through the first part of the race. The session was held in dry weather slightly hotter than any of the free practice sessions; the ambient temperature ranged between 30 and 31 °C (86 and 88 °F), while track temperature ranged between 38 and 41 °C (100 and 106 °F).

"The team has done a fantastic job of continually improving the car over the past few weeks, so I'm really proud of what we've achieved today. It's great to have locked out the front row with Heikki—we've been threatening to do it for a number of races, so to achieve it at a track where it's tricky to pass is really satisfying. There's a great harmony within the team at the moment and we really deserved this. I couldn't ask to be in a better position, we've both got good strategies for tomorrow and we'll be challenging for the win."

— Lewis Hamilton, commenting on taking pole position.

Hamilton set the fastest time in the first and final parts of the session, which clinched him pole position with a lap of 1:20.899. Although he was pleased with the handling of his McLaren—he said that he had never been more comfortable in the car—he believed that he could have recorded a faster lap, as he made a slight mistake going into Turn Five. Hamilton was joined on the front row by his teammate Kovalainen, who recorded a lap time 0.241 seconds slower and was fuelled for an additional two laps in the race. It was McLaren's first front-row lockout since the 2007 Japanese Grand Prix. Massa set the session's fastest time of 1:19.068 during its second part, but was delayed by other cars, which prevented him from heating his tyres sufficiently to achieve the maximum grip possible. He dropped to third overall in the final part of qualifying. Räikkönen was on a heavier fuel load than his teammate but made a mistake on his final flying lap that restricted him to sixth place. That left him behind Kubica and Glock on the grid. Kubica achieved his competitive time despite handling problems, which led him to describe his lap as his best so far of the season, while Glock recorded the best qualifying result of his career thus far. Alonso qualified in seventh position with Piquet in tenth on a heavy fuel load; the Renault teammates were split by Webber and Trulli. As the Soft tyres were expected to perform better in the race than the Super Softs, the McLaren drivers' use of one fewer set of the Soft tyres than their Ferrari counterparts during the qualifying session suggested Hamilton and Kovalainen might have had a tyre performance advantage in the race. This was because the Soft tyre was the fastest tyre choice over the course of a single lap, despite the theoretical performance advantage of the Super Soft; Ferrari used one more set of Soft tyres than McLaren before realising this was the case.

Vettel was the fastest driver not to advance into the final session, qualifying 11th; his best time of 1:20.131 was just over a second slower than Massa's pace in the second session. His teammate, Bourdais, set the 14th-fastest lap, but was penalised five positions on the grid for impeding Heidfeld during the first part of qualifying, a delay which limited the BMW Sauber driver to the 16th-fastest time. The Toro Rosso drivers were split before Bourdais' penalty by Jenson Button—who found his Honda's revised suspension a significant improvement—and David Coulthard, who believed the Hungaroring did not suit the handling characteristics of his Red Bull RB4 chassis. Rosberg made it into the second part of qualifying, but did not complete any laps thereafter after his Williams car developed a hydraulics problem. Kazuki Nakajima (Williams), Rubens Barrichello (Honda) and Force India drivers Giancarlo Fisichella and Adrian Sutil failed to advance beyond the first part of qualifying, and thus completed the final rows of the grid. In the first part of qualifying (the only section in which all drivers took part), the entire field was covered by just under three seconds.

=== Qualifying classification ===
Pos	No	Driver	Constructor	Q1	Q2	Q3	Grid
1	22	(United Kingdom) Lewis Hamilton	McLaren-Mercedes	1:19.376	1:19.473	1:20.899	1
2	23	(Finland) Heikki Kovalainen	McLaren-Mercedes	1:19.945	1:19.480	1:21.140	2
3	2	(Brazil) Felipe Massa	Ferrari	1:19.578	1:19.068	1:21.191	3
4	4	(Poland) Robert Kubica	BMW Sauber	1:20.053	1:19.776	1:21.281	4
5	12	(Germany) Timo Glock	Toyota	1:19.980	1:19.246	1:21.326	5
6	1	(Finland) Kimi Räikkönen	Ferrari	1:20.006	1:19.546	1:21.516	6
7	5	(Spain) Fernando Alonso	Renault	1:20.229	1:19.816	1:21.698	7
8	10	(Australia) Mark Webber	Red Bull-Renault	1:20.073	1:20.046	1:21.732	8
9	11	(Italy) Jarno Trulli	Toyota	1:19.942	1:19.486	1:21.767	9
10	6	(Brazil) Nelson Piquet Jr.	Renault	1:20.583	1:20.131	1:22.371	10
11	15	(Germany) Sebastian Vettel	Toro Rosso-Ferrari	1:20.157	1:20.144		11
12	16	(United Kingdom) Jenson Button	Honda	1:20.888	1:20.332		12
13	9	(United Kingdom) David Coulthard	Red Bull-Renault	1:20.505	1:20.502		13
14	14	(France) Sébastien Bourdais	Toro Rosso-Ferrari	1:20.640	1:20.963		19^{2}
15	7	(Germany) Nico Rosberg	Williams-Toyota	1:20.748	No time^{1}		14
16	3	(Germany) Nick Heidfeld	BMW Sauber	1:21.045			15
17	8	(Japan) Kazuki Nakajima	Williams-Toyota	1:21.085			16
18	17	(Brazil) Rubens Barrichello	Honda	1:21.332			17
19	21	(Italy) Giancarlo Fisichella	Force India-Ferrari	1:21.670			18
20	20	(Germany) Adrian Sutil	Force India-Ferrari	1:22.113			20

Notes

- ^1 – Nico Rosberg was left without a time in Q2 due to technical problems.
- ^2 – Sébastien Bourdais was penalised five places on the grid for impeding Nick Heidfeld during first qualifying.

== Race ==
The race took place in the afternoon from 14:00 local time, in dry and sunny weather, with an ambient temperature of between 30 and 31 °C (86 and 88 °F), and a track temperature ranging from 40 to 43 °C (104 to 109 °F). The race-day attendance was 84,000. As usual, the race was broadcast worldwide, with the "World Feed" coverage being produced by FOM. Every driver except Coulthard started on the Soft compound tyres. Massa made a good start on his only remaining new set of Soft tyres, moving ahead of Kovalainen from the grid and drawing alongside Hamilton into the first corner. Hamilton held the inside line for the turn, but Massa braked later than the McLaren driver and passed him around the outside. Behind the leading three in the run down to the first corner, Glock moved ahead of Kubica, while Alonso overtook Räikkönen. Barrichello made the best start in the field, moving from 17th to 13th place at the end of the first lap, while Vettel made a poor start and lost four places over the same distance. At the completion of the first lap, Massa led from Hamilton, Kovalainen, Glock, Kubica, Alonso, Räikkönen, Webber, Trulli, Piquet, Coulthard, Heidfeld, Barrichello, Button, Vettel, Bourdais, Rosberg, Nakajima, Fisichella and Sutil.

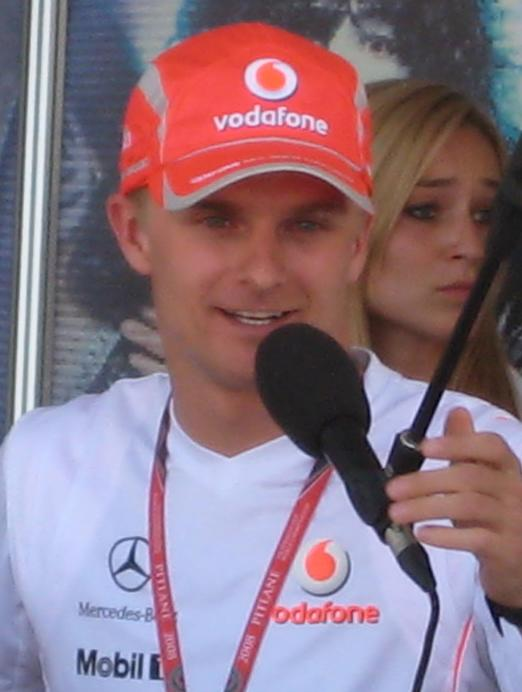
Heikki Kovalainen benefited from problems that afflicted pace-setters Hamilton and Felipe Massa to take the only win of his Formula One career.

Massa and Hamilton immediately began to pull clear of Kovalainen. On lap 3, Button overtook his teammate Barrichello for 13th position, but both Honda drivers were stuck behind Heidfeld, who was carrying a heavier fuel load than them. As the race progressed, Massa began to open a small lead over Hamilton, who put his McLaren into a "fuel-saving mode", attempting to jump ahead of Massa later in the race by making a pit stop after the Ferrari driver. In addition, the high track temperature was to the Ferrari chassis's advantage, as it was easier on its tyres than the McLaren and was able to run them at an operating temperature of up to 10 °C (18 °F) lower, resulting in less tyre wear. By lap 18, Massa had a lead of 3.5 seconds over Hamilton, who in turn was almost 8 seconds ahead of Kovalainen. Glock was a further 3 seconds behind the second McLaren driver, but was drawing ahead of Kubica in fifth, who was finding his BMW Sauber difficult to drive in race conditions with a lack of grip and stability under braking, and was holding up a group of cars behind him.

Massa, Kubica and Webber were the first three drivers to make pit stops by coming in on lap 18. The McLaren mechanics timed Massa's stop to estimate the amount of fuel he received, and when Hamilton made his own first stop on the next lap, they fuelled him to run for three laps longer than the Ferrari in the second stint of the race. Kovalainen took over the lead of the race for two laps before his pit stop on lap 21 returned it to Massa. Piquet was the last of the leading runners to make a pit stop, on lap 25, allowing him to jump ahead of Kubica, Trulli and Webber. Further down the order, Vettel made an unscheduled pit stop on lap 20 and retired two laps later with an overheating engine. By the end of lap 26, all of the leading drivers on two-stop strategies had taken their pit stops. The race order was Massa leading from Hamilton, Kovalainen, Glock, Coulthard (who was yet to pit), Alonso, Räikkönen, Piquet, Trulli, Kubica, Webber, Heidfeld, Button, Barrichello, Bourdais, Rosberg, Nakajima, Fisichella and Sutil.

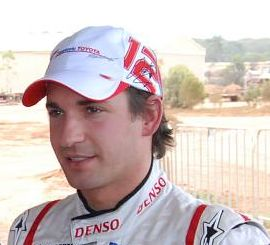
Timo Glock also recorded the best result of his career, by finishing in second place.

Hamilton rejoined the race following his first pit stop 2.6 seconds behind Massa, and needed to stay within approximately 3.5 seconds of the Ferrari driver to gain track position after the second round of pit stops. Massa began to pull away again, easing the gap open to 4 seconds by lap 32, while Hamilton locked his front-left wheel as he tried to keep up with the Ferrari, flat-spotting the tyre in the process. The two continued to set fastest laps as they pulled away from the rest of the field. On lap 29, Coulthard made his first pit stop, dropping to 12th place as a result. Button, Barrichello, Bourdais, Rosberg, Nakajima, Fisichella and Sutil also made their first pit stops at this stage of the race. Three of these drivers experienced delays during their pit stops which dropped them down the running order: Barrichello and Bourdais suffered flash fires, while Rosberg's fuel hose jammed, losing him time.

At the front of the field, Massa continued to pull away gradually from Hamilton; the gap between the two had risen to 5 seconds by the end of lap 40. On the following lap, Hamilton's front-left tyre deflated approaching Turn Two; the resultant slow lap back to the pit lane and stop for a replacement tyre dropped him to tenth place. Massa now had a 23-second lead over Kovalainen and slowed his pace accordingly, adjusting the performance of the engine to place it under less mechanical stress. He made his final pit stop on lap 44, allowing Kovalainen to take the lead until his own stop four laps later, handing Massa back his lead. On lap 41, Heidfeld made his only pit stop, dropping from 11th to 12th position. In the following laps, the other drivers made their second stops, except Nakajima, who switched to a one-stop strategy at his first visit to his pit box. Behind the leading trio of Massa, Kovalainen and Glock, Räikkönen moved ahead of Alonso despite running off the road just before his pit stop; after he exited the pit lane, Piquet fended off Trulli as they battled for position. The pit stop sequence allowed Hamilton to move back up the order, to sixth place behind Alonso. Further back, Bourdais suffered another flash fire on lap 45, and made another visit to the pit lane one lap later to have fire extinguisher foam cleaned off his helmet visor. Rosberg was the final scheduled driver to make a pit stop, on lap 58. The majority of the drivers ran with Soft tyres for the first two stints of the race, then switched to the Super Soft compound for the final stint.

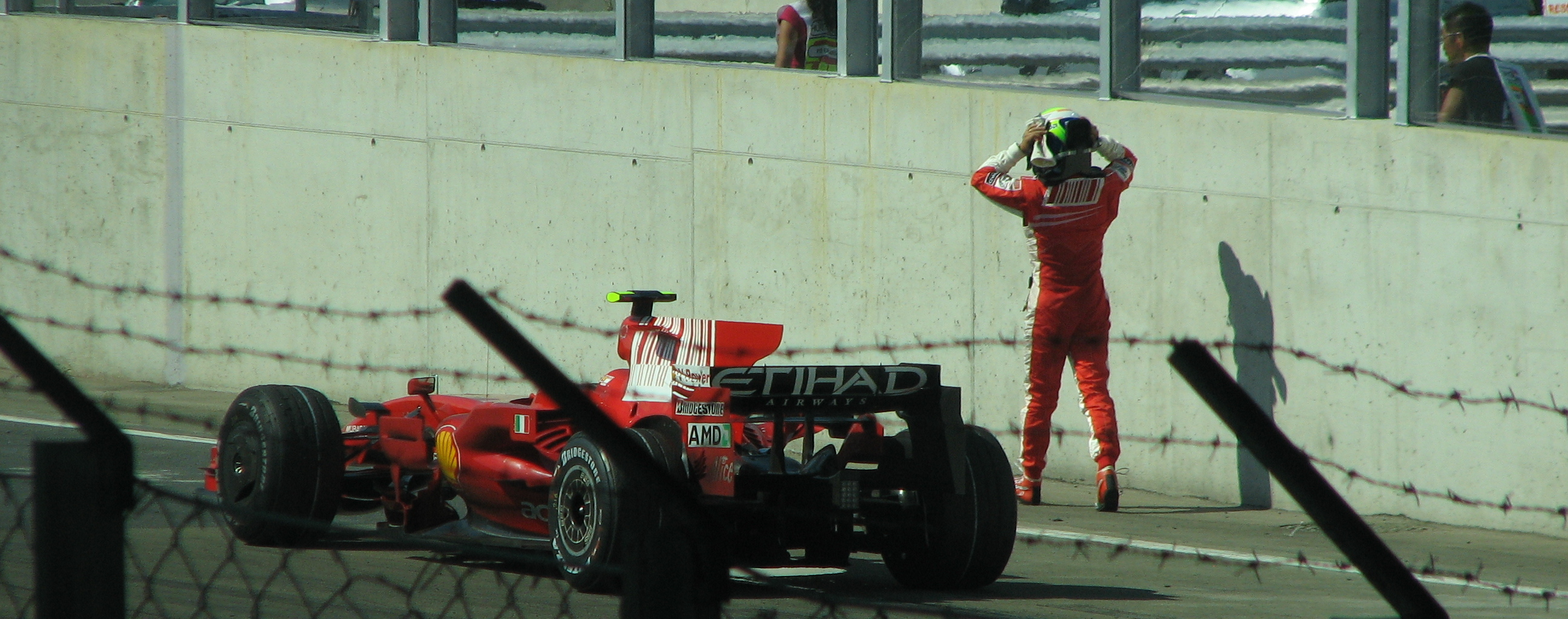
Massa walks away from his car, having suffered an engine failure while leading with three laps to go.

At the conclusion of lap 59, with the scheduled pit stops completed, the running order was Massa leading from Kovalainen, Glock, Räikkönen, Alonso, Hamilton, Piquet, Trulli, Kubica, Webber, Heidfeld, Coulthard, Button, Nakajima, Rosberg, Fisichella, Sutil, Barrichello and Bourdais. Running in clean air without a car immediately in front of him for the first time, Räikkönen set the fastest lap of the race at 1:21.195, on lap 61, as he closed the nine-second gap to Glock at a rate of one second per lap. Hamilton caught Alonso at a similar rate, but his rear Super Soft tyres began to overheat and he was unable to make any further impression after closing the gap to 1.5 seconds. On lap 62, Sutil suffered a puncture caused by a brake failure and became the second retirement of the race. In the closing laps, Kovalainen reduced his deficit to Massa to 15 seconds, but the Ferrari driver appeared to be in command of the race. However, as Massa started lap 68, his engine failed without warning, forcing him to retire from the lead with three laps remaining. Kovalainen was thus promoted into the lead, which he held to take the first victory of his Formula One career in a time of 1'37:27.067, at an average speed of 117.309 mph (188.791 km/h). Kovalainen was the 100th driver to win a Formula One World Championship race. Glock likewise claimed the best result of his career, and first podium finish, with second position. Räikkönen took the final place on the podium despite a failure in his car's rear suspension during the final few laps. Alonso and Piquet finished on either side of Hamilton, who was in fifth position, leading Symonds to describe the race as his team's best of the year so far. Trulli finished seventh, ahead of Kubica, who was extremely disappointed with the uncompetitive performance of his car at the Grand Prix closest to his home country of Poland. His teammate, Heidfeld, finished in tenth place between the two Red Bull drivers, both of whom were also disappointed by their team's performance. Button, Nakajima, Rosberg and Fisichella filled the next places, a lap behind the leader, while Barrichello was two laps down in 16th position after the delay at his first pit stop. Massa was classified in 17th place, ahead of Bourdais, who was the final finisher.

=== Post-race ===
"There have been various incidents this year and we have been in the position after Saturday quite a few times to fight for the victory, but always something has gone wrong and it hasn't functioned perfectly. Today obviously I knew Massa and Lewis were both very fast at the beginning of the race but halfway through the race I felt it was starting to work for me a little bit better and then at the end I just tried to put pressure on Massa and hoped something would happen and obviously it looked like he had a mechanical failure, so it all worked fine for me today and I am very, very happy about it. All the hard work that the whole team has put in the last few months, through difficult times, we just kept pushing and it is very respectable and I am very, very glad to score my first victory."

— Heikki Kovalainen, speaking during the post-race FIA press conference for the podium finishers.

Although Kovalainen was delighted with his first Formula One victory, he attributed much of the credit for his win to luck. After the race he said, "I feel a bit sorry for Felipe and Lewis. They both drove great races, but I know how it feels when things go wrong—I've had a few similar moments this year. I tried to put pressure on Felipe, especially during the last stint. I felt something might happen if I did that, you never know, but I still found it hard to believe when I saw his Ferrari on fire." The victory proved to be Kovalainen's only Formula One win. Glock was pleased with second position and spoke of how he had dedicated extra training to improve his race starts. He said he had focussed on not making any mistakes in the closing laps as Räikkönen closed, instead of maintaining the gap. Räikkönen described his race as "frustrating and boring" due to the amount of time he spent stuck behind slower cars.

The podium finishers were overshadowed in the media by coverage of the ill fortune of both the weekend's pace-setters, Hamilton and Massa. Massa in particular was praised for his performance. The Ferrari team principal, Stefano Domenicali, said it was, "the best race of his career. It was fantastic the way he managed the race." Journalist Mark Hughes described it as "almost certainly his best race to date", and colleague Simon Arron termed it as "one of the finest afternoons of his F1 career". Both drew attention to his controlled aggression at the first corner of the race, followed by his relentless, mistake-free pace. Arron, in particular, noted that Massa's first-corner passing move was more typical of Hamilton's attacking style than his own, and was a "defining moment" in Massa's championship campaign. Hamilton himself later expressed surprise that Massa had been able to overtake him in such a manner, and warned his rival that "it won't happen again". Hughes described the Grand Prix as "a throwback race", in that the leaders had suffered from unreliability, and the winner had not been in contention on speed alone; It was a situation reminiscent of earlier times in the sport, when the cars were generally less reliable.

Bridgestone director of motorsport Hirohide Hamashima said Hamilton's puncture was probably caused by debris, although as a result of the damage the tyre had sustained, the precise nature of the failure was impossible to determine. He also stated that Hamilton's tyre was more vulnerable to debris damage because he had flat-spotted it earlier in the race. Massa said he had no prior indication of his engine failure. The problem was later traced to a connecting rod failure caused by an impurity in the component material. An identical problem caused Räikkönen to retire from the following race, the European Grand Prix.

As a consequence of the race, Hamilton extended his lead in the Drivers' Championship to five points ahead of Räikkönen, who moved ahead of Massa in the standings. Kubica maintained fourth place; Kovalainen's win moved him to within three points of Heidfeld in fifth. In the Constructors' Championship, Ferrari continued to lead, but McLaren jumped ahead of BMW Sauber for second position. Behind Toyota, Renault moved ahead of Red Bull. Despite his increased lead, Hamilton acknowledged that he expected the Ferrari drivers to be formidable opponents in the season's seven remaining races. After the eventual conclusion of the championship in Hamilton's favour by one point, the Hungarian Grand Prix was highlighted as one of Massa's most obvious lost opportunities in his bid to win the title.

=== Race classification ===
Pos	No	Driver	Constructor	Laps	Time/Retired	Grid	Points
1	23	(Finland) Heikki Kovalainen	McLaren-Mercedes	70	1:37:27.067	2	10
2	12	(Germany) Timo Glock	Toyota	70	+11.061	5	8
3	1	(Finland) Kimi Räikkönen	Ferrari	70	+16.856	6	6
4	5	(Spain) Fernando Alonso	Renault	70	+21.614	7	5
5	22	(United Kingdom) Lewis Hamilton	McLaren-Mercedes	70	+23.048	1	4
6	6	(Brazil) Nelson Piquet Jr.	Renault	70	+32.298	10	3
7	11	(Italy) Jarno Trulli	Toyota	70	+36.449	9	2
8	4	(Poland) Robert Kubica	BMW Sauber	70	+48.321	4	1
9	10	(Australia) Mark Webber	Red Bull-Renault	70	+58.834	8	
10	3	(Germany) Nick Heidfeld	BMW Sauber	70	+1:07.709	15	
11	9	(United Kingdom) David Coulthard	Red Bull-Renault	70	+1:10.407	13	
12	16	(United Kingdom) Jenson Button	Honda	69	+1 Lap	12	
13	8	(Japan) Kazuki Nakajima	Williams-Toyota	69	+1 Lap	16	
14	7	(Germany) Nico Rosberg	Williams-Toyota	69	+1 Lap	14	
15	21	(Italy) Giancarlo Fisichella	Force India-Ferrari	69	+1 Lap	18	
16	17	(Brazil) Rubens Barrichello	Honda	68	+2 Laps	17	
17	2	(Brazil) Felipe Massa	Ferrari	67	Engine	3	
18	14	(France) Sébastien Bourdais	Toro Rosso-Ferrari	67	+3 Laps	19	
Ret	20	(Germany) Adrian Sutil	Force India-Ferrari	62	Brakes	20	
Ret	15	(Germany) Sebastian Vettel	Toro Rosso-Ferrari	22	Overheating	11	

== Championship standings after the race ==
Drivers' Championship standings

+/−	Pos.	Driver	Points
	1	(United Kingdom) Lewis Hamilton	62
1	2	(Finland) Kimi Räikkönen	57
1	3	(Brazil) Felipe Massa	54
	4	(Poland) Robert Kubica	49
	5	(Germany) Nick Heidfeld	41

Constructors' Championship standings

+/−	Pos.	Driver	Points
	1	(Italy) Ferrari	111
1	2	(United Kingdom) McLaren-Mercedes	100
1	3	(Germany) BMW Sauber	90
	4	(Japan) Toyota	35
1	5	(France) Renault	31

- Note: Only the top five positions are included for both sets of standings.

== See also ==
- 2008 Hungaroring GP2 Series round

Previous race: 2008 German Grand Prix	FIA Formula One World Championship; 2008 season	Next race: 2008 European Grand Prix
Previous race: 2007 Hungarian Grand Prix	Hungarian Grand Prix	Next race: 2009 Hungarian Grand Prix
