= Jordan EJ14 =

Formula One racing car

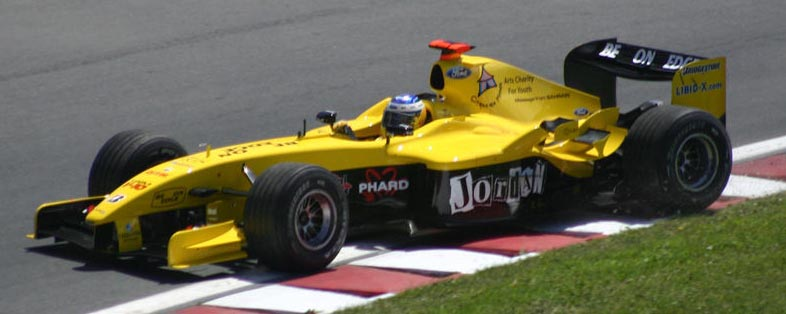
- Nick Heidfeld driving the EJ14 at the 2004 Canadian Grand Prix
- Category: Formula One
- Constructor: Jordan
- Designers: Gary Anderson (Technical Director); John McQuilliam (Chief Designer); Stephen Taylor (Head of Composite Design); Ian Hall (Head of Transmission Design); Mike Wroe (Head of Electronics); Nicolò Petrucci (Head of Aerodynamics)
- Predecessor: EJ13
- Successor: EJ15

Technical specifications
- Chassis: Full Carbon-fibre and honeycomb composite monocoque
- Suspension (front): Double wishbones, pushrod-activated torsion bars and dampers
- Suspension (rear): Double wishbones
- Length: 4,670 mm (183.9 in)
- Width: 1,800 mm (70.9 in)
- Height: 950 mm (37.4 in)
- Axle track: Front: 1,400 mm (55.1 in); Rear: 1,418 mm (55.8 in)
- Wheelbase: >3,000 mm (118.1 in)
- Engine: Ford RS2 (Cosworth CR-6) 2,998 cc (182.9 cu in), 90° V10, NA, mid-engine, longitudinally-mounted
- Transmission: Jordan 7-speed longitudinal, semi-automatic
- Power: 800-900 hp @ 18,000-19,000 rpm
- Weight: 600 kg (1,322.8 lb) (including driver)
- Fuel: BP
- Lubricants: Castrol
- Tyres: Bridgestone

Competition history
- Notable entrants: Jordan Ford
- Notable drivers: 18. (Germany) Nick Heidfeld; 19. (Italy) Giorgio Pantano; 19. (Germany) Timo Glock
- Debut: 2004 Australian Grand Prix
- Last event: 2004 Brazilian Grand Prix
Races	Wins	Podiums	Poles	F/Laps
18	0	0	0	0
- Constructors' Championships: 0
- Drivers' Championships: 0

The Jordan EJ14 was the car with which the Jordan team competed in the 2004 Formula One season. The car was driven by Nick Heidfeld, Giorgio Pantano and Timo Glock.

== Overview ==
The car itself was not a totally new car; instead it was a major upgrade of the previous year's uncompetitive EJ13. The chassis itself was modified and combined with a new aerodynamic package and more powerful Ford-badged Cosworth engine. It also had a return to a single-keel suspension layout. However, the team's small budget meant that little or no testing of the cars was carried out, both before the season and during it. Unsurprisingly, the car was just as uncompetitive as its predecessor. The lack of speed was blamed on a lack of power coming from the Cosworth engine, which the team claimed was not the same as those being used by Jaguar, Ford's works team.

== Racing history ==
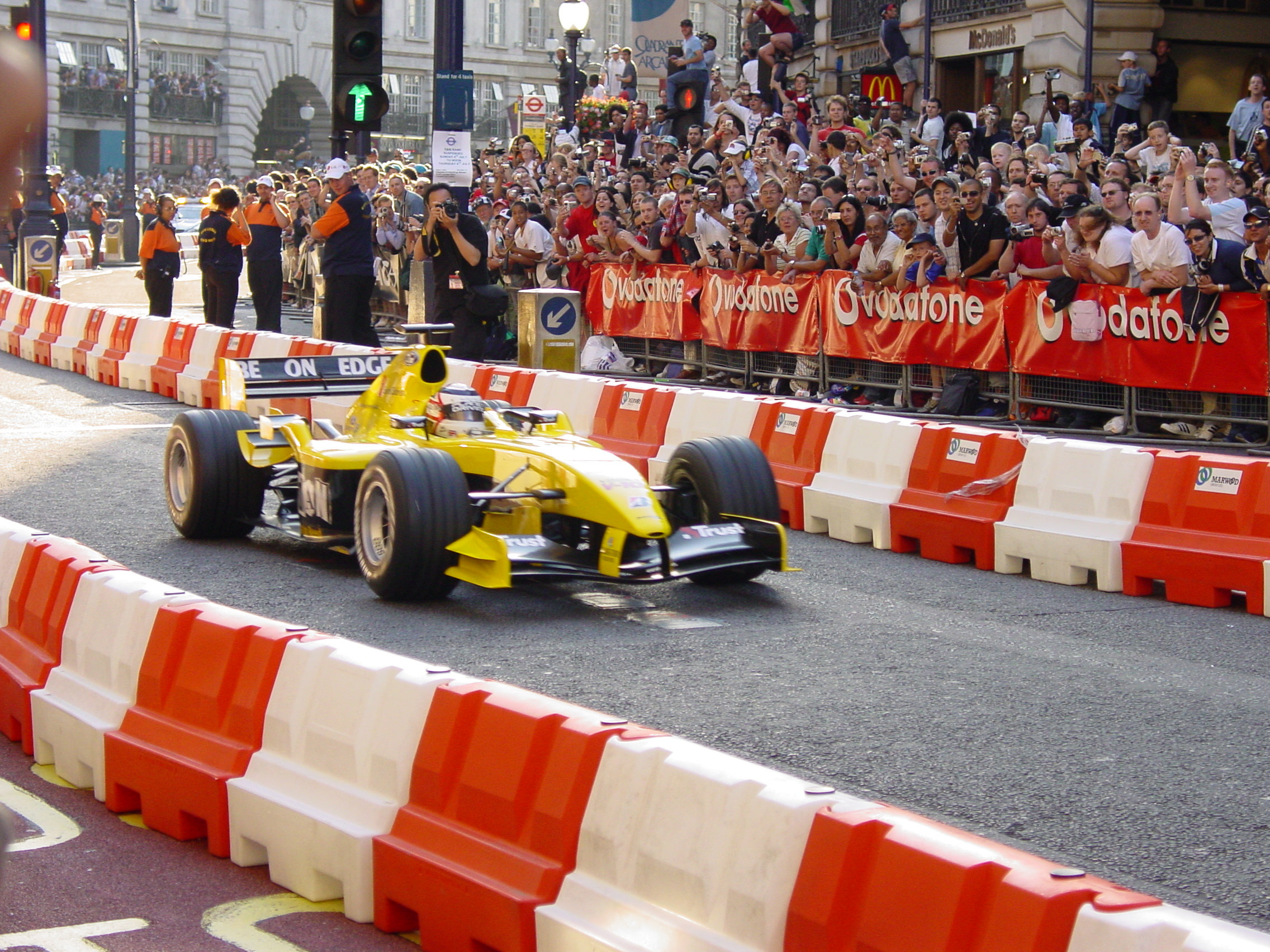
Nigel Mansell demonstrates an EJ14 in the streets of London in the days leading up to the 2004 British Grand Prix.

It was driven by Nick Heidfeld, who was swapped with Sauber in favour of Giancarlo Fisichella, and Formula 3000 driver Giorgio Pantano. Heidfeld was chosen for his skill, while Pantano got a drive primarily because he had sponsors who would contribute money to the team. It was expected that unemployed Jos Verstappen would take the second seat, but the deal for him to drive fell through. In Canada, Pantano was replaced by German Timo Glock, as Pantano's backers were unable to pay for his drive in time. Glock went on to score two points in that race after both Williams and Toyotas were disqualified for brake duct infringements. Glock would then replace Pantano for good in the final three rounds, when it became clear that Pantano would not be able to pay for his seat any longer.

The car's performance and reliability were generally poor all year. A total of 5 points were scored all year. Heidfeld drove to seventh place at Monaco, and both Jordans were promoted to 7th and 8th after the Canadian race due to multiple cars getting disqualified. However, it was still the first time in the team's history that a top-six result had not been achieved. There were other points-scoring opportunities, but poor luck and poor reliability robbed the team of these chances. Most notably Heidfeld was running strongly at the carnage-packed United States Grand Prix, and looked set for points when his engine failed. Points could also have been scored at Spa, but both drivers were involved in accidents, with Pantano out on lap 1, and Heidfeld finishing 10th, but 5 laps down. Occasionally the Jordans were able to fight with other teams, notably Sauber, but more commonly Jaguar and Toyota. But for the most part, the EJ14s would spend their time running behind most of the field, with just the Minardis behind.

The team's future was put into doubt late in the season when Ford announced it was withdrawing from F1, leaving the team with no engines for the following year. For a while it appeared that the team would close immediately after the final race of the season. Only a late deal to run Toyota engines for 2005 saved the team.

== Sponsorship and livery ==
=== General ===
As in previous years, the basic color of the car was yellow; The front and rear wings, T-cam and side pods were black. The main sponsor remained the tobacco brand Benson & Hedges, which advertised on both wings, the nose, the side pods and on the drivers' helmets. Jordan used the Benson & Hedges logos except at the Canadian, French, British Grands Prix, the Benson & Hedges lettering was partially covered over so that “Be on Edge” could be read or replaced with the team name. (The Benson & Hedges sponsorship was replaced entirely with Sobranie, another Gallaher Group brand, for the Malaysian, United States, Chinese and Japanese Grands Prix; for the United States Grand Prix in particular, in order to circumvent the one brand name sponsorship rule imposed by the Tobacco Master Settlement Agreement, as Phillip Morris USA owned the B&H trademark in the United States and was bound by the MSA). However, the team's budget was very small, which directly affected their performance. Smaller sponsors such as Trust contributing small amounts of money to the team's budget. A lack of testing and development, plus the need to have drivers who could pay for their seat, rather than be skilled, affected the team's results.

=== Messages ===
The team had only just survived the winter break after the 2003 season, and when the EJ14 broke cover for the first time, it carried the message "Lazarus", referring to the team's resurrection from the dead. For the rest of the season the car would run with various messages of peace on the engine over. These included a dove at the Australian Grand Prix, and a picture of Ayrton Senna at the San Marino Grand Prix, to commemorate the tenth anniversary of his death. The changing images were chosen by the Bahrains government, who purchased sponsorship space on the team's engine cover to celebrate the inaugural Bahrain Grand Prix.

=== Campaigns ===
The team supported various campaigns and organizations placed on the engine cover including:

Equality at the Malaysian Grand Prix; Dalí at the and text "Fundació Gala-Salvador Dalí" Spanish Grand Prix; CIESM at the and text "Caring For The Med" Monaco Grand Prix; Cirque du Monde at the and text "Arts Charity For Yourth" Canadian Grand Prix; Life on mars at the United States Grand Prix; DATA at the French Grand Prix; Save the Children at the British Grand Prix; 46664 at the German Grand Prix; Stop Global Warming at the Hungarian Grand Prix; Child Focus at the Belgian Grand Prix and a "www.sanpatrignano.org" website at the and text "Prugs Don't Win" Italian Grand Prix.

=== Events ===
Throughout the season, the team celebrated or commemorated various events on the engine cover:

A European flag at the and text "Europe In Harmony" European Grand Prix; a dragon and text reading "Welcome China" at the inaugural Chinese Grand Prix; the 2005 Special Olympics World Winter Games at the Japanese Grand Prix and the scheduled date of the 2005 Bahrain Grand Prix at the Brazilian Grand Prix.

== Other ==
Eddie Jordan daughter Miki was a Fosters grid girl at the British Grand Prix, standing in front of Jordan driver Nick Heidfeld on the 17th spot of the starting grid.

== Complete Formula One results ==
(key) (results in bold indicate pole position)

Year	Team	Engine	Tyres	Drivers	1	2	3	4	5	6	7	8	9	10	11	12	13	14	15	16	17	18	Points	WCC
2004	Jordan	Ford V10*	**B**		AUS	MAL	BHR	SMR	ESP	MON	EUR	CAN	USA	FRA	GBR	GER	HUN	BEL	ITA	CHN	JPN	BRA	5	9th
2004	Jordan	Ford V10*	**B**	(Germany) Nick Heidfeld	Ret	Ret	15	Ret	Ret	7	10	8	Ret	16	15	Ret	12	11	14	13	13	Ret	5	9th
2004	Jordan	Ford V10*	**B**	(Italy) Giorgio Pantano	14	13	16	Ret	Ret	Ret	13		Ret	17	Ret	15	Ret	Ret	Ret				5	9th
2004	Jordan	Ford V10*	**B**	(Germany) Timo Glock								7								15	15	15	5	9th

* Denotes Cosworth-built engines, badged as Ford
