= 1997 Monaco Grand Prix Formula Three =

Circuit de Monaco (1997-2002)

Results from the 1997 Monaco Grand Prix Formula Three held at Monte Carlo on May 10, 1997, in the Circuit de Monaco.

== Classification ==
Pos	Driver	Constructor	Laps	Time/Retired
1	(Germany) Nick Heidfeld	Dallara F397-Opel	24	37.35,297
2	(Germany) Wolf Henzler	Martini MK73-Opel	24	37.57,694
3	(France) Patrice Gay	Dallara F396-Opel	24	37.58,593
4	(Belgium) David Saelens	Dallara F396-Opel	24	37.59,414
5	(France) Sébastien Philippe	Dallara F396-Opel	24	38.07,350
6	(Germany) Sascha Bert	Dallara F397-Opel	24	38.08,537
7	(Belgium) Bas Leinders	Dallara F397-Opel	24	38.10,967
8	(Italy) Maurizio Mediani	Dallara F396-Fiat	24	38.11,330
9	(Italy) Niki Cadei	Dallara F396-Fiat	24	38.12,340
10	(Italy) Paolo Ruberti	Dallara F396-Fiat	24	38.12,978
11	(Italy) Oliver Martini	Dallara F397-Opel	24	38.13,902
12	(Belgium) Tim Verbergt	Dallara F397-Opel	24	38.14,288
13	(Germany) Alexander Müller	Dallara F397-Opel	24	38.31,856
14	(Germany) Steffen Widmann	Dallara F397-Opel	24	38.36,662
15	(Italy) Alfredo Melandri	Dallara F396-Fiat	24	38.38,889
16	(France) Damien Bianchi	Dallara F396-Mugen-Honda	24	38.39,505
17	(Italy) Marco Barindelli	Dallara F396-Opel	24	38.54,522
18	(Switzerland) Gabriele Gardel	Dallara F396-Fiat	24	39.07,363
19	(Germany) Dominik Schwager	Dallara F397-Opel	19	
