= Nick Heidfeld =

German racing driver (born 1977)

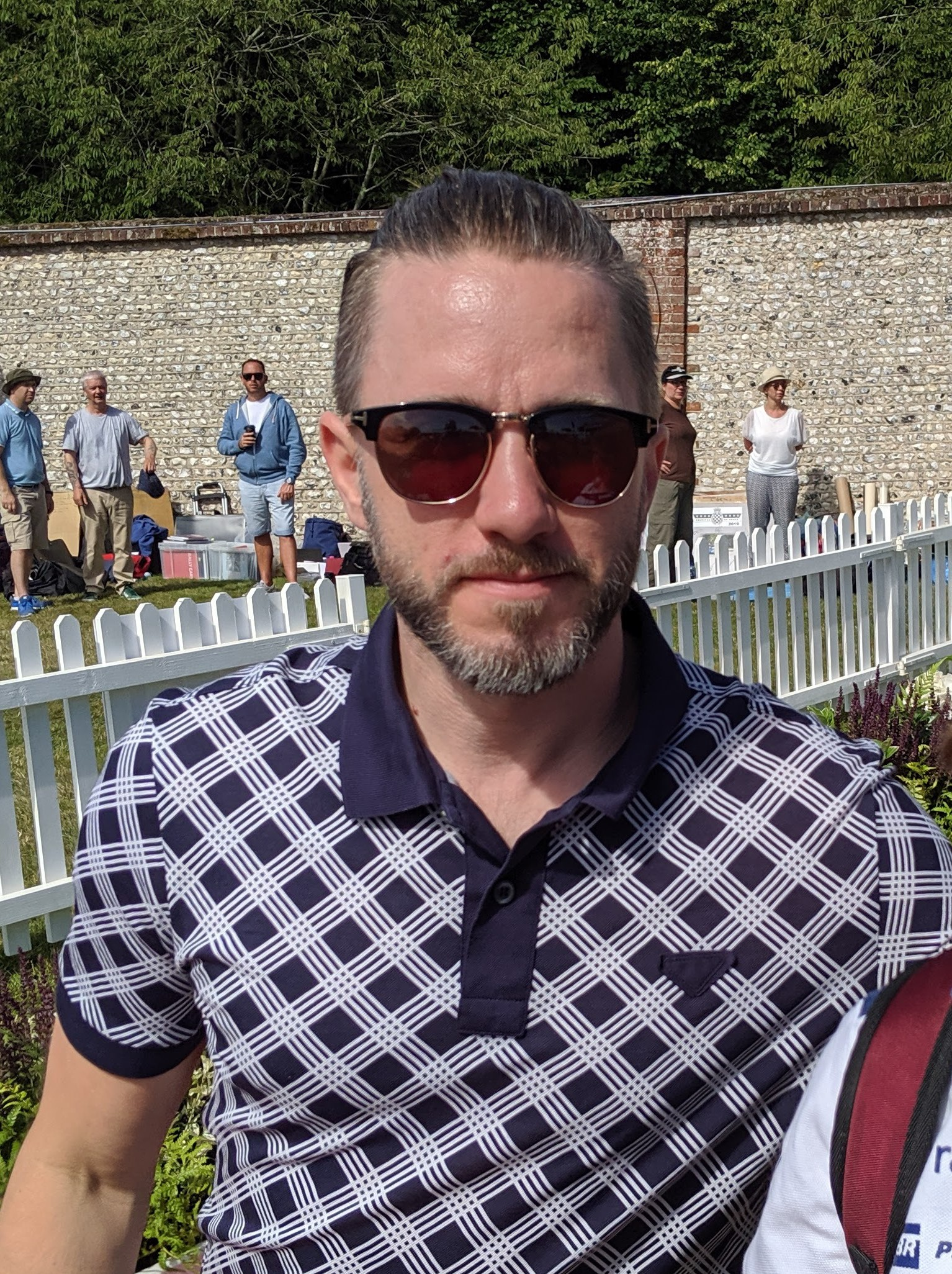
- Heidfeld in 2019
- Born: Nick Lars Heidfeld; 10 May 1977 (age 49); Mönchengladbach, North Rhine-Westphalia, West Germany
- Spouse: Patricia Papen (m. 2011)
- Children: 3
- Relatives: Sven Heidfeld (brother)

Formula One World Championship career
- Nationality: (Germany) German
- Active years: 2000–2011
- Team(s): Prost, Sauber, Jordan, Williams, BMW Sauber, Renault
- Entries: 185 (183 starts)
- Championships: 0
- Wins: 0
- Podiums: 13
- Career points: 259
- Pole positions: 1
- Fastest laps: 2
- First entry: 2000 Australian Grand Prix
- Last entry: 2011 Hungarian Grand Prix

Formula E career
- Categorisation: FIA Platinum
- Years active: 2014–2018
- Teams: Venturi, Mahindra
- Car number: 23
- Starts: 44
- Championships: 0
- Wins: 0
- Podiums: 8
- Poles: 0
- Fastest laps: 1
- Best finish: 7th in 2016–17

24 Hours of Le Mans career
- Years: 1999, 2012–2016
- Teams: Mercedes, Rebellion
- Best finish: 4th (2012, 2014)
- Class wins: 1 (2014)

Previous series
- 2012–2016 2013 2012 2012 1998–1999 1996–1997 1994–1995: FIA WEC; ALMS; V8 Supercars; Porsche Supercup; International F3000; German F3; German FFord

Championship titles
- 2014 1999 1997 1997 1995 1994: WEC LMP1 Private Teams Drivers' Trophy; International F3000; German F3; Monaco F3 Grand Prix; German FFord 1800; German FFord 1600

Nick Lars Heidfeld (German pronunciation: [nɪk laʁs ˈhaɪtfɛlt]; born 10 May 1977) is a German former racing driver, who competed in Formula One from 2000 to 2011.

Born and raised in Mönchengladbach, Heidfeld began competitive kart racing aged 11. He progressed to Formula Ford in 1994, winning multiple national championships before graduating to Formula Three. After finishing third in 1996, Heidfeld won the German Formula Three Championship the following year, also winning the Monaco F3 Grand Prix. He then finished runner-up to Juan Pablo Montoya in International F3000, before winning the series in 1999. A test driver for McLaren since 1998, Heidfeld signed for Prost in 2000 to partner Jean Alesi, making his Formula One debut at the Australian Grand Prix. After a non-classified championship finish for Prost with the AP03, Heidfeld moved to Sauber in 2001, finishing fourth on debut and taking his maiden podium at the Brazilian Grand Prix as he outscored rookie teammate Kimi Räikkönen.

Heidfeld remained at Sauber for two further seasons before moving to Jordan in 2004, where he scored multiple points finishes in the relatively uncompetitive EJ14. He signed for Williams in 2005, scoring several podiums amongst his maiden pole position at the European Grand Prix. Following a string of high-profile injuries, Heidfeld left Williams to re-join Sauber—now known as BMW Sauber—in 2006. He scored eight podiums across four seasons with BMW Sauber, finishing a career-best fifth in the World Drivers' Championship in 2007. BMW withdrew from the sport at the end of the 2009 season, leaving Heidfeld without a seat. He replaced Pedro de la Rosa at Sauber from the 2010 Singapore Grand Prix onwards, and joined Renault for his 2011 campaign to substitute for an injured Robert Kubica. Heidfeld took his final podium in Malaysia before he was replaced by Bruno Senna after the Hungarian Grand Prix. Heidfeld departed Formula One with one pole position, two fastest laps and 13 podiums, the latter of which remains the record without winning a Grand Prix.

Heidfeld moved to Formula E for its inaugural 2014–15 season with Venturi, achieving his first podium at the Moscow ePrix before joining Mahindra in 2015. Over three seasons with Mahindra, Heidfeld scored seven further podiums before leaving at the end of 2017–18. Outside of formula racing, Heidfeld has entered six editions of the 24 Hours of Le Mans, winning the LMP1-L class in 2014 and finishing fourth overall twice. He competed in five seasons of the FIA World Endurance Championship from 2012 to 2016 with Rebellion, and finished runner-up in the American Le Mans Series in 2013. Heidfeld served as chairman of the Grand Prix Drivers' Association in 2010.

== Early life and career ==
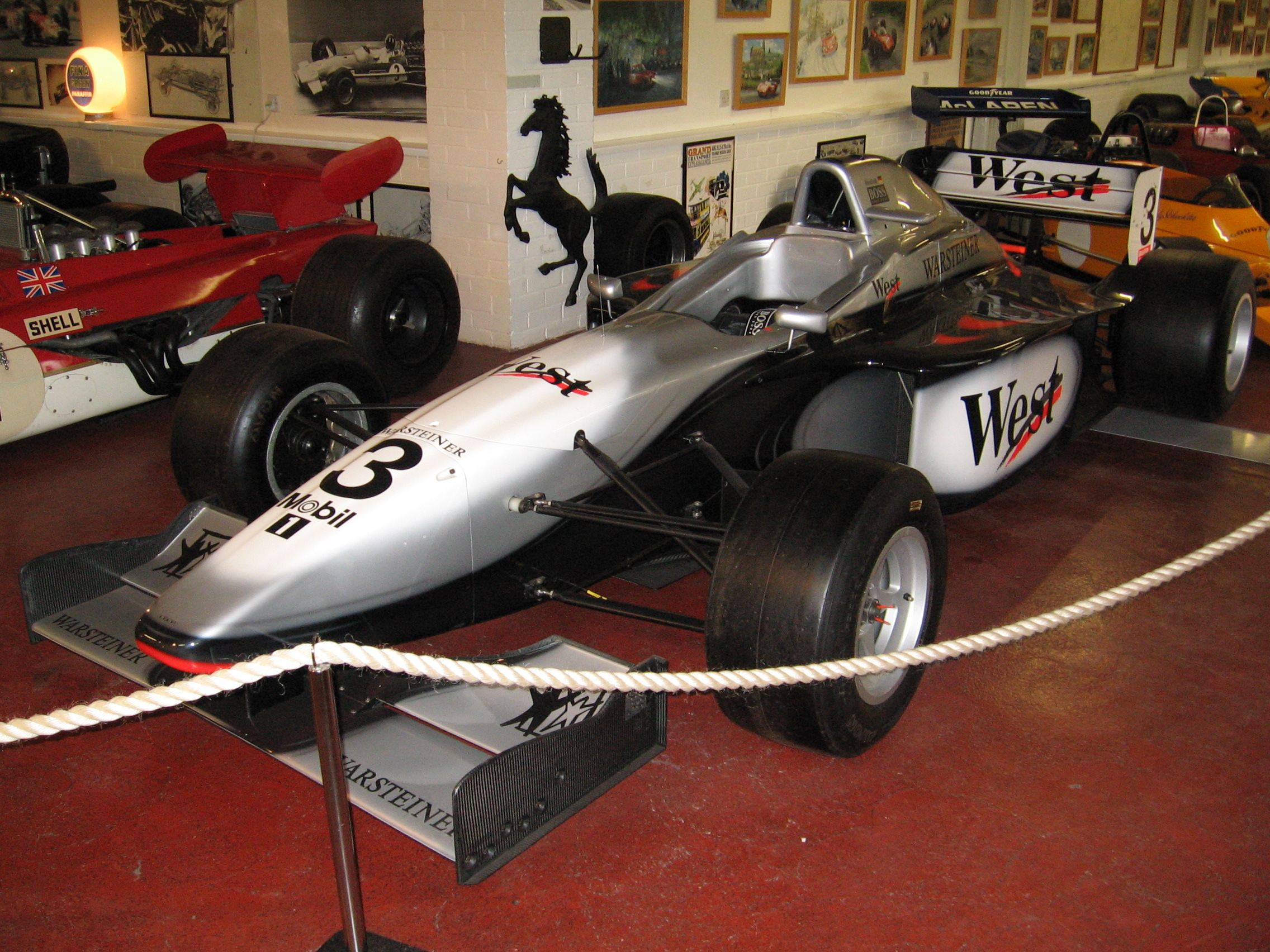
Nick Heidfeld’s Lola F3000, West Competition

Heidfeld was born in Mönchengladbach, West Germany on 10 May 1977, and began racing karts at the age of 11 in 1988. In 1994, he moved into the German Formula Ford series, gaining widespread attention by winning eight of the nine races to take the title that season. In 1995, he won the German International Formula Ford 1800 Championship, and came second in the Zetec Cup. This led to a drive in the German Formula Three Championship for 1996, where he finished third overall, after taking three wins. He entered the end of the season Macau Grand Prix and won the first heat of the race, attracting the attention of compatriot Norbert Haug, who later signed him up for the West Competition team.

== Junior career ==
The following year, Heidfeld won the German F3 Championship for Bertram Schäfer Racing, with support from McLaren/West, including a win at the Monaco Grand Prix Formula Three support race. In 1998, he won three races and was runner-up in the International Formula 3000 championship, with the West Competition team. At the final race of the season, he was demoted to the back of the grid from pole position, after his team used non-compliant fuel. He finished the race ninth and out of the points, losing the championship by seven points to Juan Pablo Montoya. During that season, he was also the official test driver for the McLaren-Mercedes Formula One team. In 1999, he won the International Formula 3000 Championship. That year he also took the official track record at the Goodwood Festival of Speed which stood for 20 years. He was also a member of the Mercedes squad that raced at the 1999 24 Hours of Le Mans, but the team withdrew after the Mercedes-Benz CLR flipped 3 separate times during the race weekend.

== Formula One career ==
=== Prost (2000) ===
Heidfeld was signed as a race driver for the Prost Grand Prix F1 team for the 2000 season, alongside Formula One veteran Jean Alesi. Heidfeld struggled with his new car and suffered a string of retirements, as well as colliding with his teammate on more than one occasion.

=== Sauber (2001–2003) ===
Heidfeld departed the ill-fated Prost at the end of that season, before signing a three-year contract with Sauber for 2001. He was partnered with then rookie driver Kimi Räikkönen. Heidfeld scored his first podium with a third-place finish in the Brazilian Grand Prix. After the announcement of Mika Häkkinen's retirement, many thought that Heidfeld would replace him in the McLaren-Mercedes team, as he had Mercedes backing and had outscored the much more inexperienced Räikkönen by three points over the year. However, the McLaren seat went to Räikkönen, and Heidfeld stayed with Sauber for 2002 and 2003, where he racked up a number of points finishes. In 2002, he outperformed another rookie teammate, Felipe Massa, but was then beaten by his more experienced fellow countryman, Heinz-Harald Frentzen, in 2003.

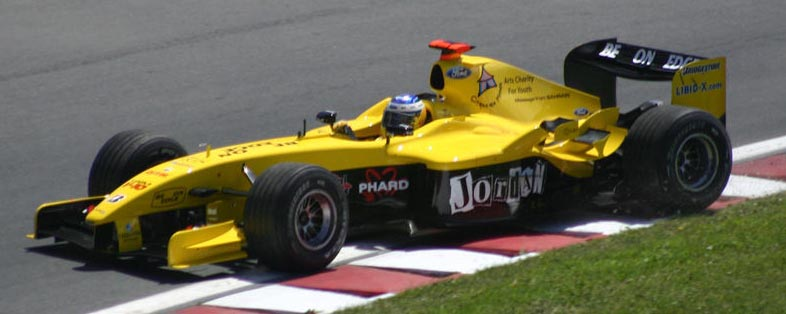
Heidfeld driving the Jordan EJ14 at the 2004 Canadian Grand Prix

=== Jordan (2004) ===
At the end of the 2003 season, Heidfeld was replaced at the Sauber team by Jordan's Giancarlo Fisichella and looked to be without a race seat for the 2004 season. However, after impressing during a series of preseason tests, it was announced that Heidfeld would race with the financially strapped Jordan team, alongside rookie Giorgio Pantano. The EJ14 was an upgrade of the previous season's uncompetitive EJ13 and proved slow. Despite this, Heidfeld often outperformed the car, finishing ahead of more competitive vehicles. He finished seventh at the Monaco Grand Prix and eighth at the Canadian Grand Prix (after the disqualifications of Williams and Toyota teams) and finished the season with three points.

=== Williams (2005) ===
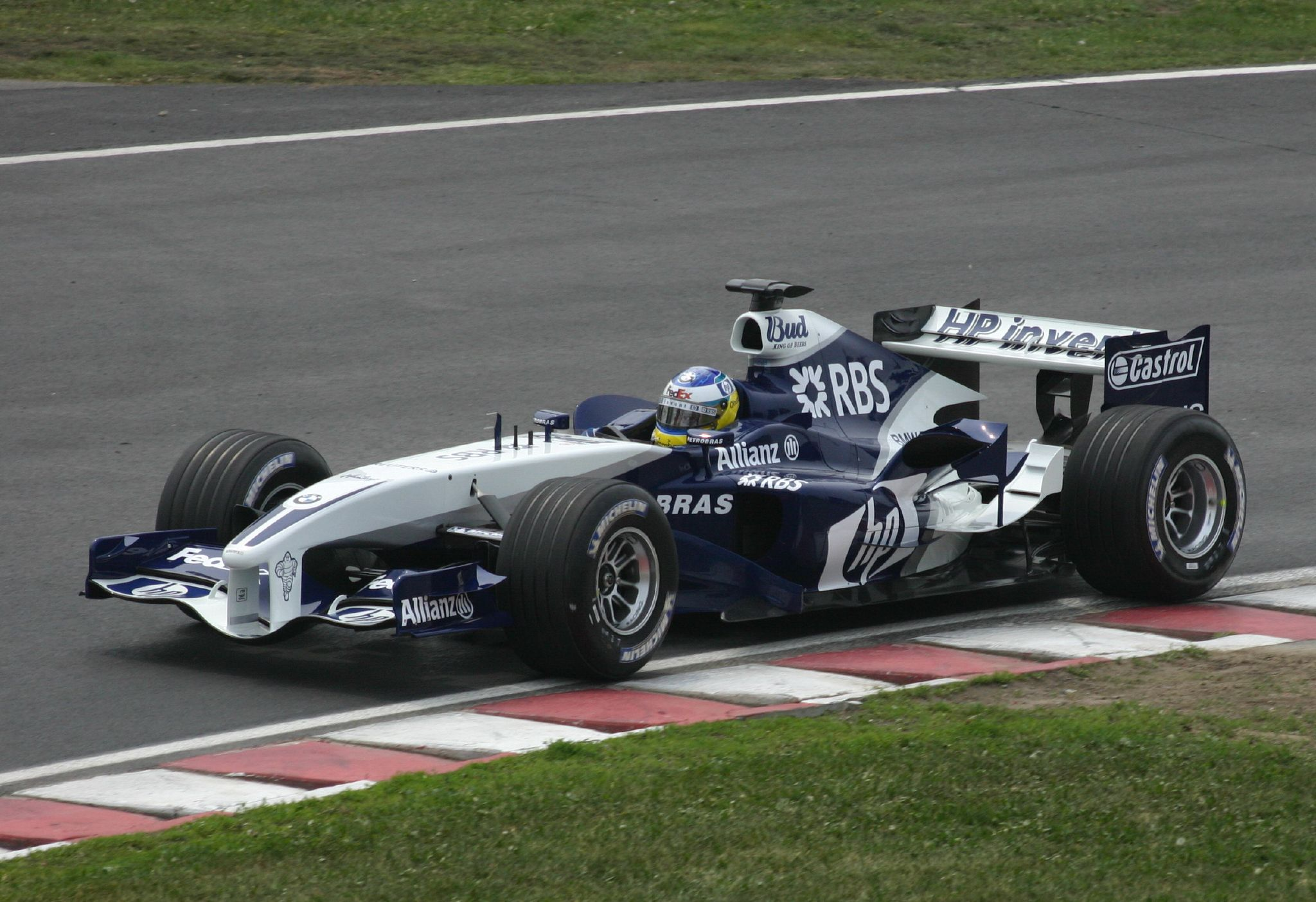
Heidfeld driving the FW27 for Williams at the 2005 Canadian Grand Prix.

During the winter of 2004–2005, Heidfeld tested with the Williams team, in a 'shootout' against Antônio Pizzonia for the second race seat alongside Mark Webber. At the Williams launch on 31 January 2005, it was announced that Heidfeld would be the race driver for the team in 2005, replacing the McLaren-bound Juan Pablo Montoya.

Heidfeld performed well throughout the season, with podium finishes at three races. He took his first, and only, pole position at the European Grand Prix.

Heidfeld missed the Italian and Belgian Grands Prix due to injuries suffered in a testing accident. Scheduled to come back for Brazil, he was injured again when hit by a motorbike when out cycling, and therefore forced to sit out the rest of the season.

=== BMW Sauber (2006–2009) ===
==== 2006 ====
Heidfeld gained a contract with his then Williams' engine supplier, BMW, when they bought the Sauber team and entered Formula One as BMW Sauber for the 2006 season, replacing Felipe Massa who was bound for Ferrari and thus Nick Heidfeld returned to Hinwil-based squad for the first time since 2003 season but under BMW ownership.

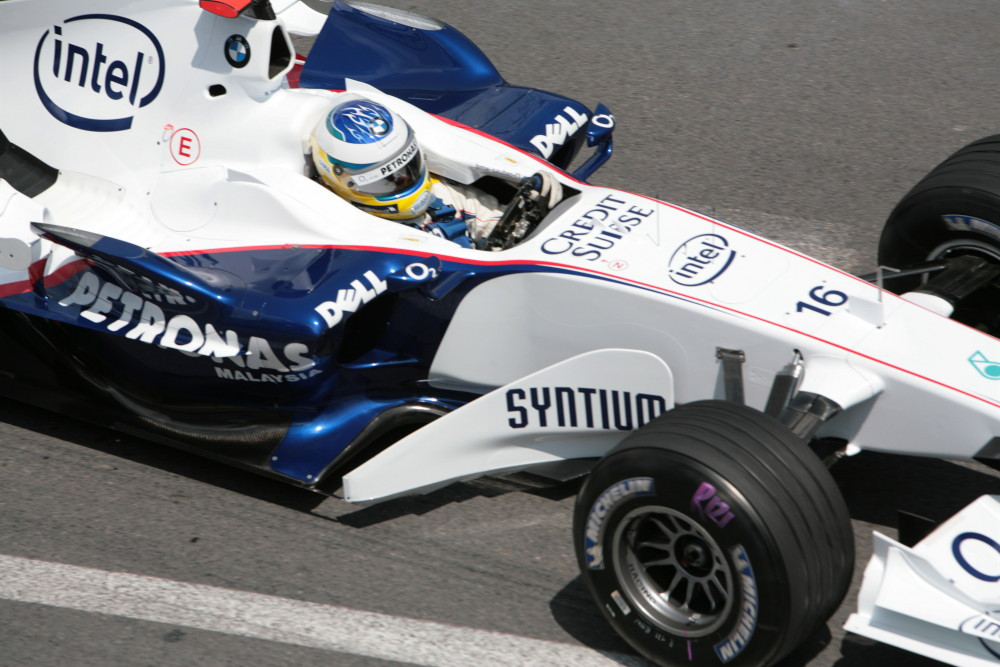
Heidfeld driving the F1.06 for BMW Sauber at the 2006 Monaco Grand Prix

During 2006, Heidfeld scored points several times for his new team. At Melbourne, he ran as high as second until the safety car came out. He eventually finished fourth. At Indianapolis, he was eliminated in a spectacular first lap accident which saw fellow drivers Scott Speed, Jenson Button, Kimi Räikkönen and Juan Pablo Montoya also go out. Heidfeld's car was launched into a quadruple barrel roll, but he and the other drivers all walked away unharmed. The Hungarian Grand Prix saw Heidfeld give BMW Sauber their first podium finish and best result of the year, when he finished third, even though he had only qualified tenth on the grid.

At the end of 2006, Heidfeld was quoted attacking the media's saturation coverage of his teammate Robert Kubica, who had scored fewer points than him. This has happened two other times in Heidfeld's career; in 2001 when he was teammates with Kimi Räikkönen (whom he beat twelve points to nine) and in 2002, when he was teammates with Felipe Massa (whom he beat by seven points to four). Räikkönen and Massa later formed the 2007 Ferrari driver line-up.

==== 2007 ====
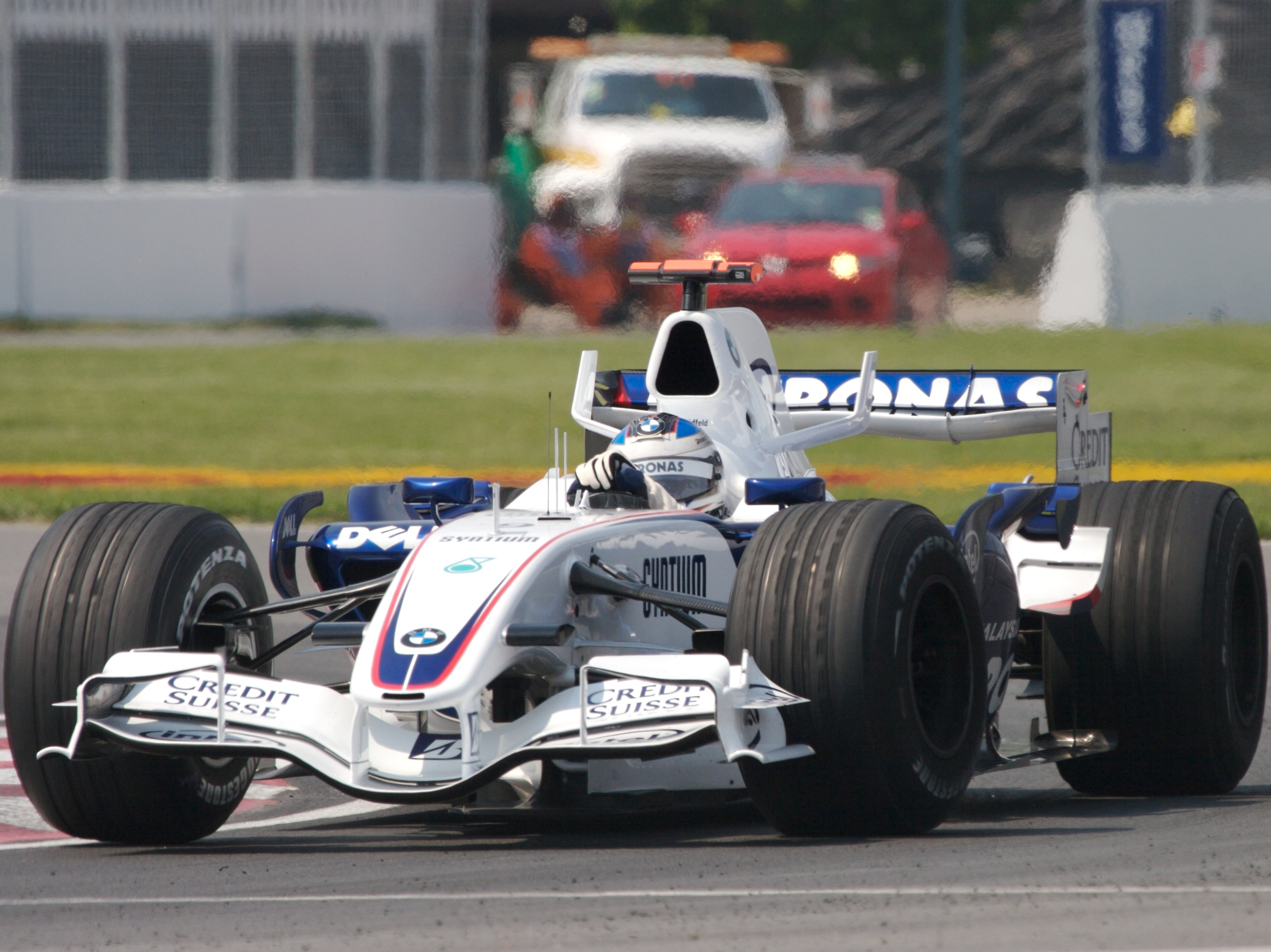
Heidfeld driving the F1.07 for BMW Sauber at the 2007 Canadian Grand Prix, where he took his best result of the season by finishing in second place

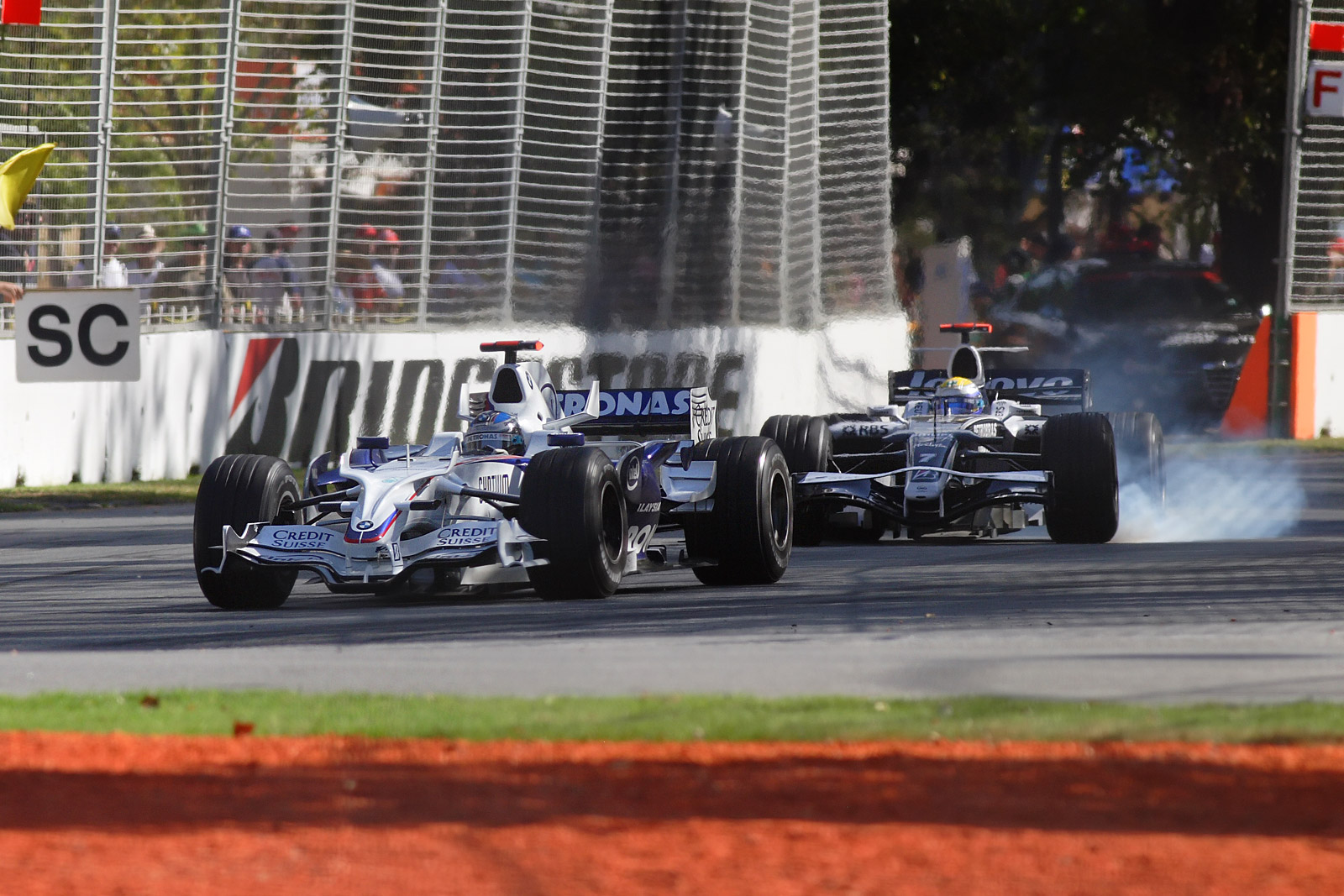
Heidfeld took second place at the 2008 Australian Grand Prix.

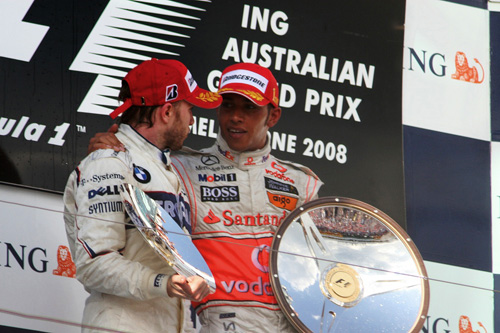
Heidfeld, who finished second in 2008 Australian Grand Prix, with race winner Lewis Hamilton on the podium

Heidfeld started the 2007 season strongly. In Bahrain, he chased down and overtook reigning world champion Fernando Alonso around the outside, finishing half a minute ahead of his BMW teammate Kubica. He scored three fourth places in the opening three races, a sixth in Monaco, and a second place at the Canadian Grand Prix, where he also out-qualified both Ferraris, equalling his best ever Grand Prix finish. After retiring from fifth place at Indianapolis, he was outscored by teammate Kubica at both Magny-Cours and Silverstone. At an eventful European Grand Prix at the Nürburgring, Heidfeld's home circuit, where he collided with Kubica on the opening lap, he recovered and overtook Kubica on the final lap to finish sixth, despite making six pitstops during the race. Heidfeld returned to form in Hungary, qualifying second and finishing third to score his and BMW's second podium of the season. He finished fourth at the Turkish and Italian Grand Prix, and fifth in the Belgian Grand Prix. He eventually finished a career-best fifth in the championship with 61 points, outpointing Kubica by 22 points.

On 28 April 2007, Heidfeld drove three demonstration laps around the Nürburgring's legendary 14 mile Nordschleife track, which made him the first driver in 31 years to pilot a current F1 car there. About 45,000 spectators attended the event, which was held after a four-hour VLN endurance race.

==== 2008 ====
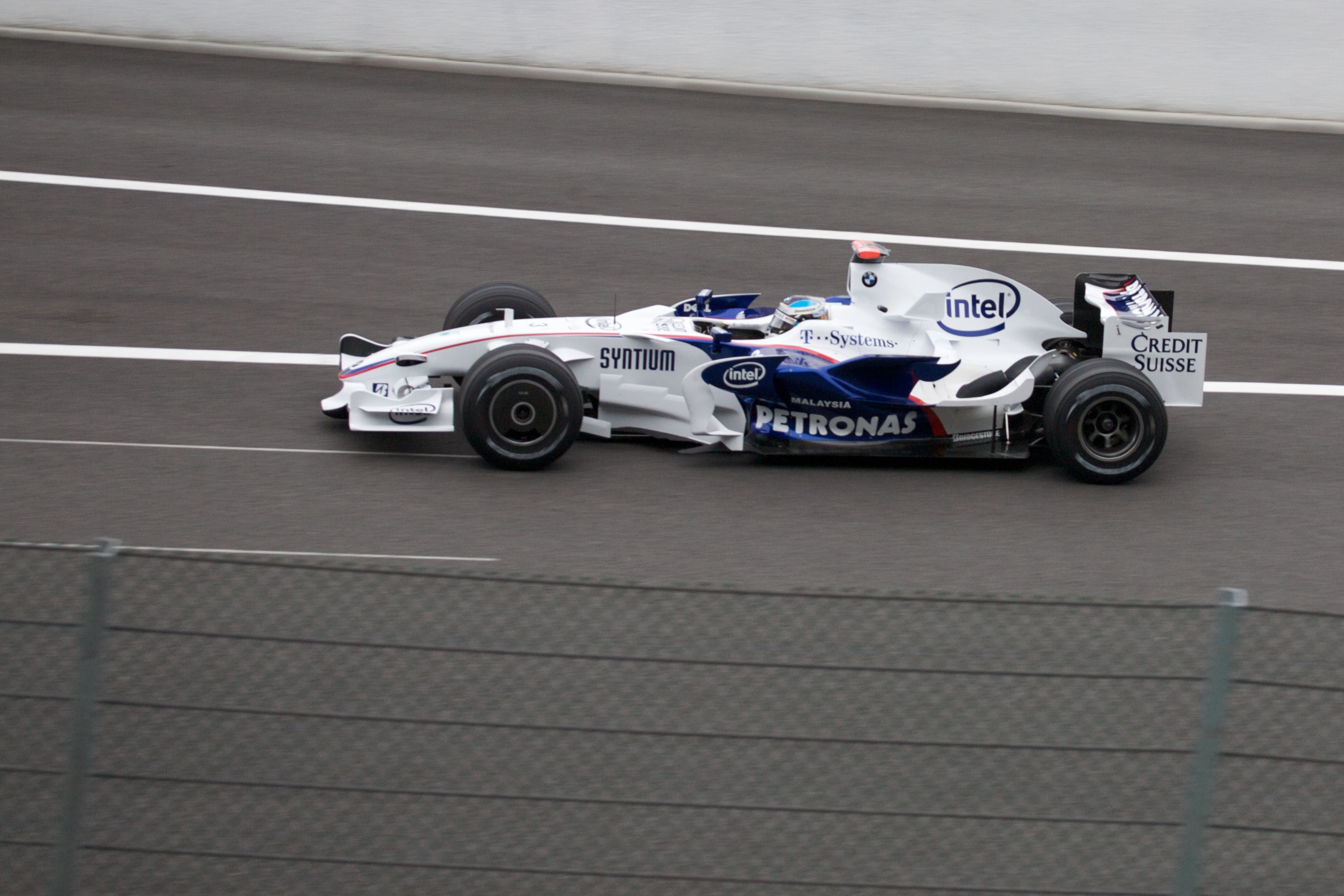
Heidfeld scored his fourth second-place finish of 2008 at the Belgian Grand Prix.

After several months of negotiations, BMW confirmed that Heidfeld would stay with the team for 2008.

Heidfeld began the 2008 season strongly, finishing second in Australia after qualifying fifth. In Malaysia, he qualified fifth but dropped down to tenth at the first corner after being pushed wide by Jarno Trulli. He got back up to sixth, also setting his first ever fastest lap in the process. In Bahrain he started from sixth place but he did not gain a place at the start, but passed Trulli and Heikki Kovalainen to climb up to fourth. He finished there and this fourth gave him second in the championship.

After a few disappointing qualifying sessions and races in the following weeks (after which the German press started to call him "Leidfeld", with "Leid" meaning "misery" in German), Kubica and Heidfeld made BMW Sauber history by securing the third-year team's first victory, and first one-two finish respectively in Canada. Heidfeld was positioned eighth on the grid and after losing a place at the start, before gaining it back, was sitting comfortably in eighth place once again before a safety car situation saw the top-sevencars enter the pits in what was to soon become a bizarre series of errors that left Heidfeld and Kubica battling for the top two places. Heidfeld was switched to a one-stop fuel strategy and came out of his stop ahead of Kubica, but considerably heavier on fuel. Not long afterwards, Heidfeld moved off the racing line allowing Kubica to make an easy pass, which then allowed the lighter BMW Sauber to build up a considerable lead on Heidfeld, who was occupied with preventing Fernando Alonso, also in a lighter car, from chasing Kubica. The gap built by Kubica allowed him to rejoin the race comfortably in the lead after his final pitstop with no threats behind him. Heidfeld finished the race second, solidifying his fifth-place position in the driver's points although his post-race body language suggested he was unhappy to have ceded a potential win for the benefit of the team. Heidfeld had a disappointing race in France, failing to score any points. He came back strongly at the British Grand Prix, starting fifth and finishing second in the wet conditions. Another strong performance, where he set the fastest lap of the race for the second time this season, was his home grand prix at the Hockenheimring showed that, for the time being, he had reversed the performance deficit to his teammate. Another second-place finish at the Belgian Grand Prix, followed by fifth and sixth-place finishes in Italy and Singapore respectively put him just one point behind current World Champion Kimi Räikkönen with just three races remaining.

It was confirmed on 6 October that both Heidfeld and teammate Kubica would remain at the BMW Sauber team for the 2009 season.

In the last three races, Heidfeld scored four points, ending in sixth place in the standings after being passed by Fernando Alonso at the last round of the season. However, Heidfeld became only the second driver to finish eighteen races in a single season, after Tiago Monteiro completed the same feat with Jordan in 2005. Heidfeld also became the first driver to finish every single race in a season since Michael Schumacher in 2002.

==== 2009 ====
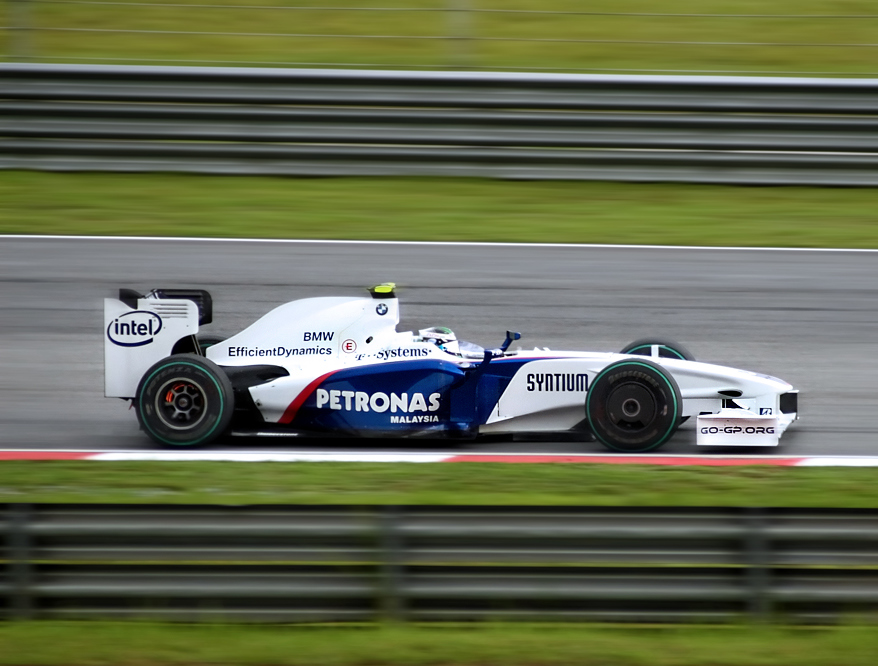
Heidfeld tied Stefan Johansson's record for most podium finishes without a win by finishing second at the 2009 Malaysian Grand Prix.

Heidfeld began 2009 in Australia by qualifying in 11th place and finishing tenth in the race. At the Malaysian Grand Prix, Heidfeld again qualified in 11th, but started tenth as Sebastian Vettel was issued a ten-place drop (for an incident caused in Australia with Heidfeld's teammate Kubica). The race was stopped due to torrential rain on the 33rd lap, when Heidfeld was third, but as set out in the regulations, the result was taken at the end of the penultimate completed lap, when Heidfeld had been running second. Because less than 75% of the race distance had been covered, the drivers only received half points. He scored a further two points at the Spanish Grand Prix, and finished fifth at Spa to score another four points. A seventh-place finish at Monza added a further two points to his 2009 tally. Nevertheless, four points-scoring finishes in the final six races secured him thirteenth position in the Drivers' Championship, two points ahead of Kubica.

In Singapore, Heidfeld's run of 41 consecutive classified finishes was brought to an end due to a collision with Force India's Adrian Sutil.

=== 2010: Different stints ===
==== Mercedes and Pirelli test driver ====
Following BMW's decision to withdraw from the sport at the end of the 2009 season, Heidfeld's future in Formula One was uncertain. It was mentioned that he was considered to drive for Mercedes GP alongside fellow German Nico Rosberg but the team signed another German in Michael Schumacher instead. McLaren was also a potential destination however these negotiations came to nothing as well. Heidfeld was then tipped for a seat at Sauber alongside Kamui Kobayashi but they decided to go with Pedro de la Rosa. Heidfeld was then in the running for a Renault seat alongside fellow BMW Sauber refugee Robert Kubica, but on 4 February, Heidfeld was confirmed as the test and reserve driver for Mercedes.

At the Australian Grand Prix, Heidfeld was chosen to succeed Pedro de la Rosa as Chairman of the Grand Prix Drivers' Association. He left the position upon taking the role of Pirelli's test driver ahead of the Belgian Grand Prix, and was replaced by Rubens Barrichello.

In August 2010, with Heidfeld not yet having driven the Mercedes MGP W01 car, the team released him from his contract so that he could become the Pirelli tyre company's test driver. Heidfeld tested a Toyota TF109 car fitted with Pirelli tyres on a number of occasions in 2010, ahead of the firm's replacement of Bridgestone as the sport's sole tyre supplier in 2011. Heidfeld completed three tests for Pirelli in Mugello, Paul Ricard and Jerez before being released from his duties to join Sauber, with his place being taken by Romain Grosjean.

==== Returns to F1 with Sauber (2010) ====
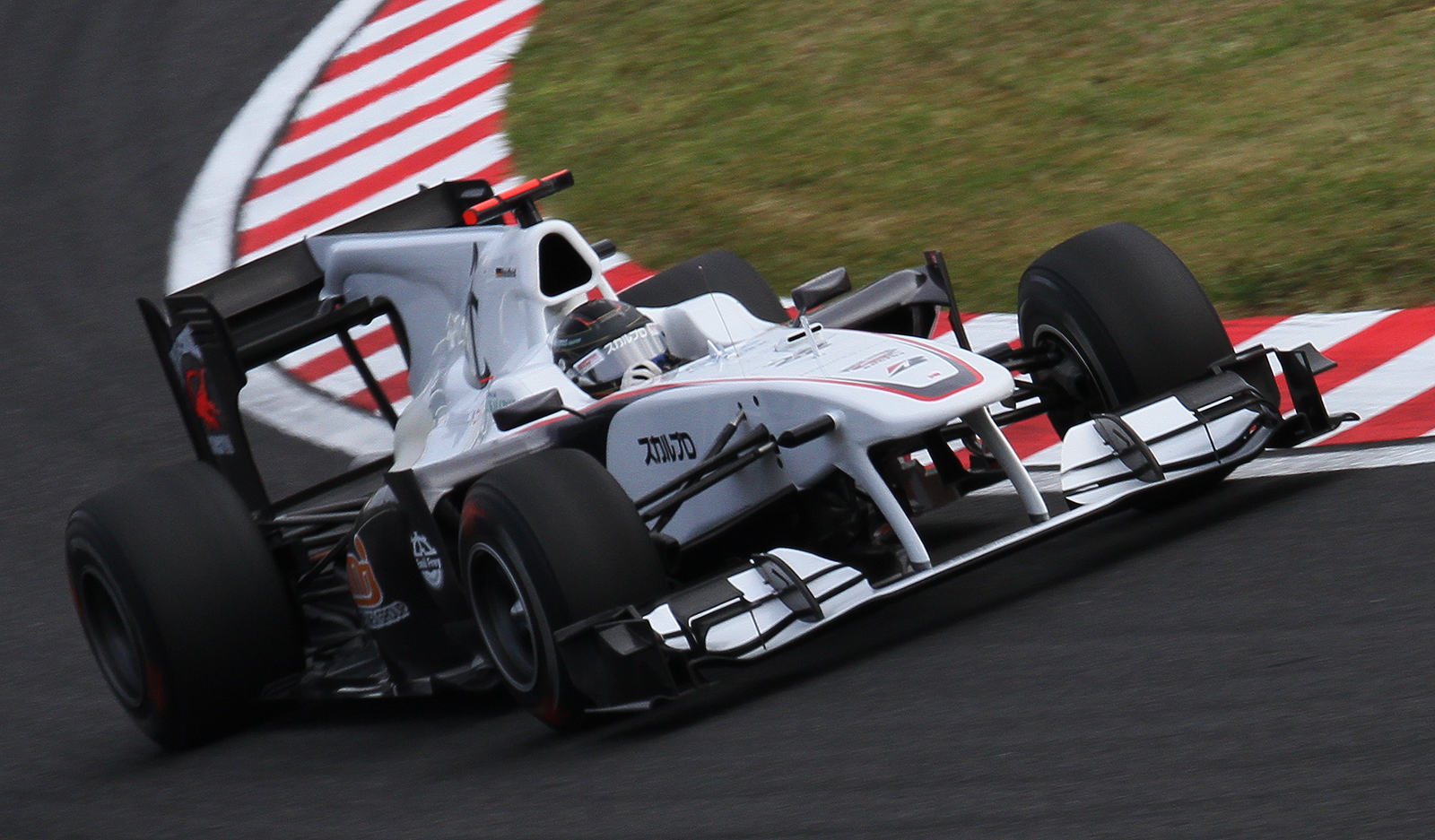
Heidfeld driving for Sauber at the 2010 Japanese Grand Prix

In September 2010, Heidfeld returned to the Formula One grid, replacing Pedro de la Rosa at the Sauber team for the remainder of the 2010 season. This marked his third spell with them. On 4 October 2010, Sauber confirmed their driver line-up for 2011 as Kamui Kobayashi and Sergio Pérez, seemingly leaving Heidfeld without a drive for 2011, before replacing Robert Kubica at Renault, who was injured in a rally accident on 6 February 2011.

=== Lotus Renault (2011) ===
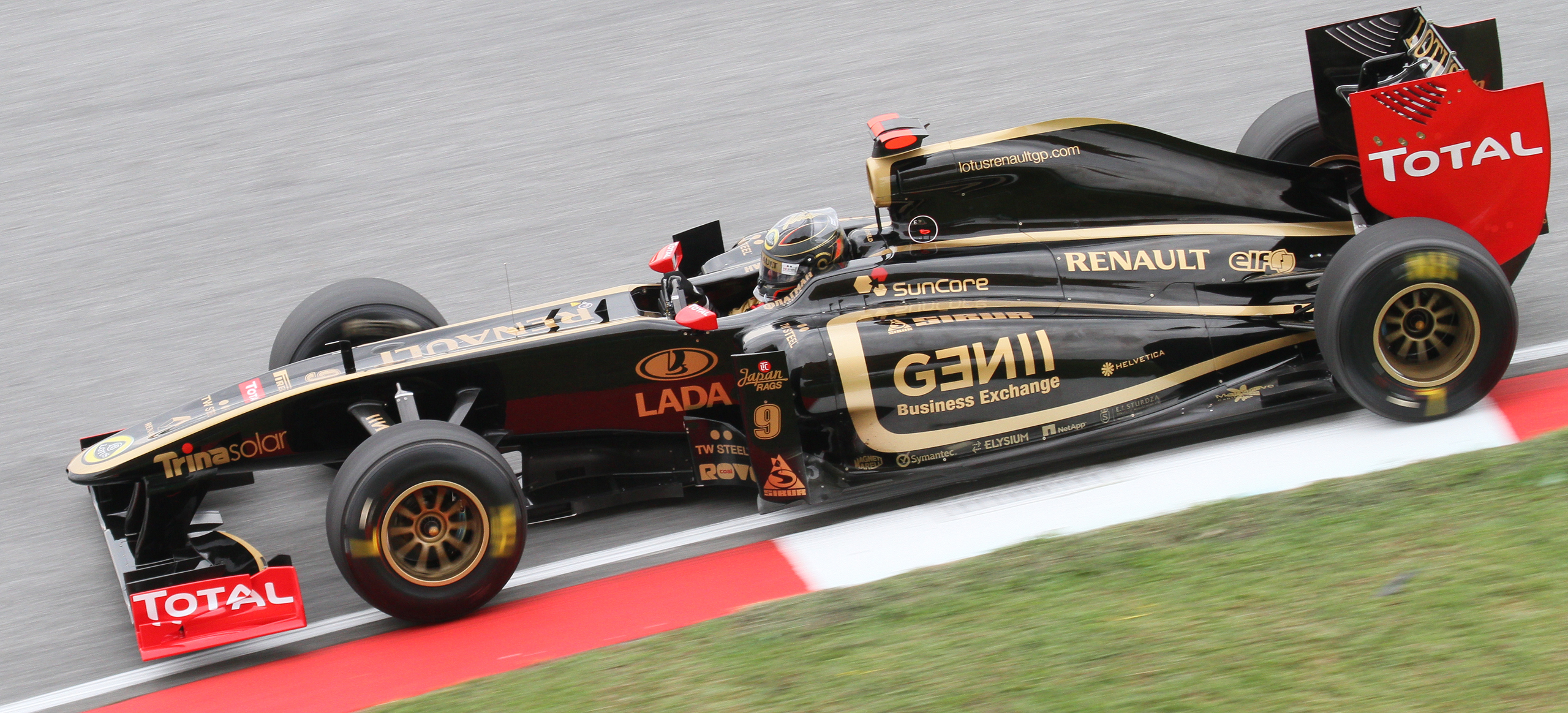
Heidfeld scored his thirteenth podium finish at the 2011 Malaysian Grand Prix.

On 9 February, Lotus Renault GP confirmed that Heidfeld would be sharing testing duties with Bruno Senna on the Saturday and Sunday of the four-day test at Jerez, to evaluate the drivers in preparation of replacing the injured and former BMW Sauber teammate Robert Kubica, who had suffered long-term injuries to his arm and hand in a crash whilst rallying in Italy, for the 2011 season. On the Saturday, Heidfeld set the quickest time of the day, stating that he enjoyed his day's running – 86 laps – with the team, and had fun driving the car. Heidfeld was confirmed as Kubica's replacement on 16 February 2011. In Australia, the first race of the season following the cancellation of the Bahrain Grand Prix, Heidfeld qualified 18th and ended 12th after suffering significant damage to his car due to another competitor driving into him at the start of race. On 10 April 2011, Heidfeld finished third, after starting sixth, in the Malaysian Grand Prix at Sepang, breaking Stefan Johansson's record of 12 podiums without a win. He added another 12th place in China, before a seventh-place finish in Turkey after a close battle with teammate Petrov. Two eighth places in Spain and Monaco were followed by a retirement at the Canadian Grand Prix, after running into the back of Kamui Kobayashi and causing damage to his front wing, which broke under acceleration and collapsed under the car. He was forced to retire after his car caught fire after exiting the pit lane on lap 25 in the Hungarian Grand Prix. Heidfeld was replaced by Bruno Senna ahead of the Belgian Grand Prix. Heidfeld officially parted company with the team on 2 September 2011.

=== Legacy ===
In 2016, in an academic paper that reported a mathematical modeling study that assessed the relative influence of driver and machine, Heidfeld was ranked the 23rd best Formula One driver of all time.

== Endurance racing ==
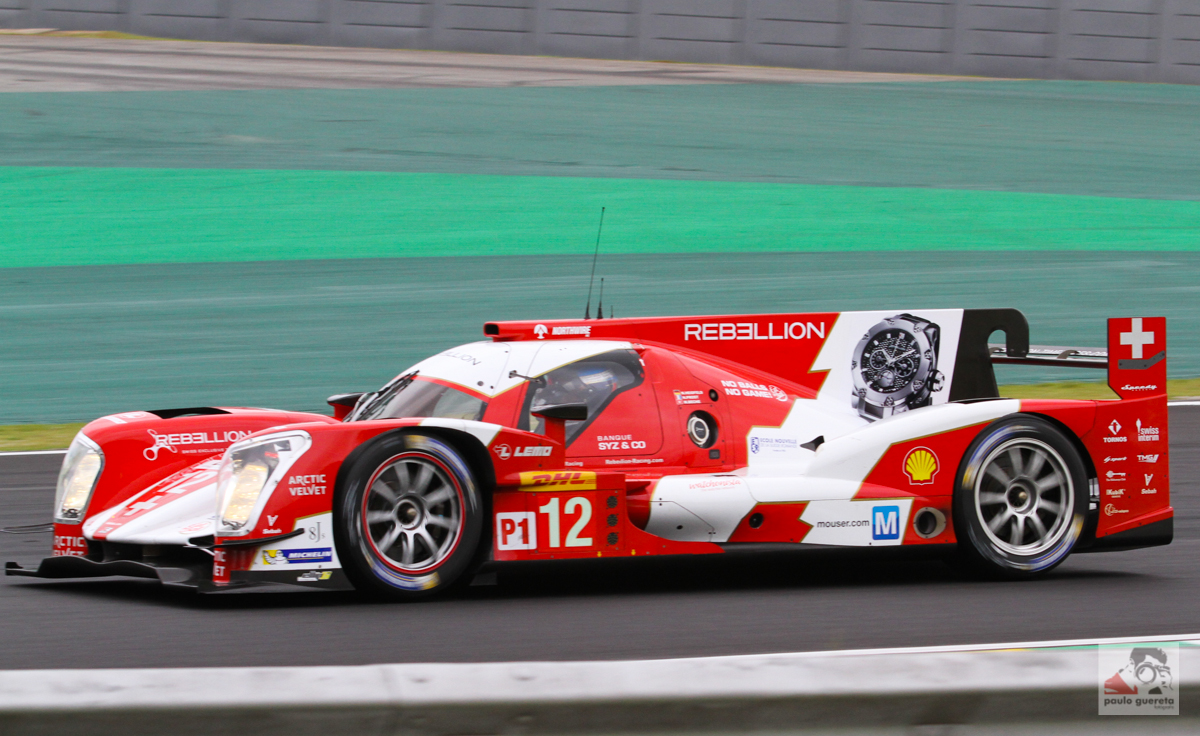
The Lola B12/60 driven by Heidfeld and his teammates during the 2014 6 Hours of São Paulo.

On 1 February 2012, it was confirmed that Heidfeld would join the Rebellion Racing team to contest both the Le Mans 24 Hours and selected races of the FIA World Endurance Championship. In addition to Le Mans, he also raced at the Sebring 12 Hours and Spa 6 Hours, sharing a Lola-Toyota LMP1 car with teammates Neel Jani and Nicolas Prost. The car finished 32nd overall and seventh in class at Sebring after encountering problems, before leading home a Rebellion one-two in the unofficial privateer class at Spa, finishing fifth overall behind the four works Audis. At Le Mans, Heidfeld and his teammates went one better by finishing fourth, splitting the Audis after a fast and problem-free run.

== Formula E ==
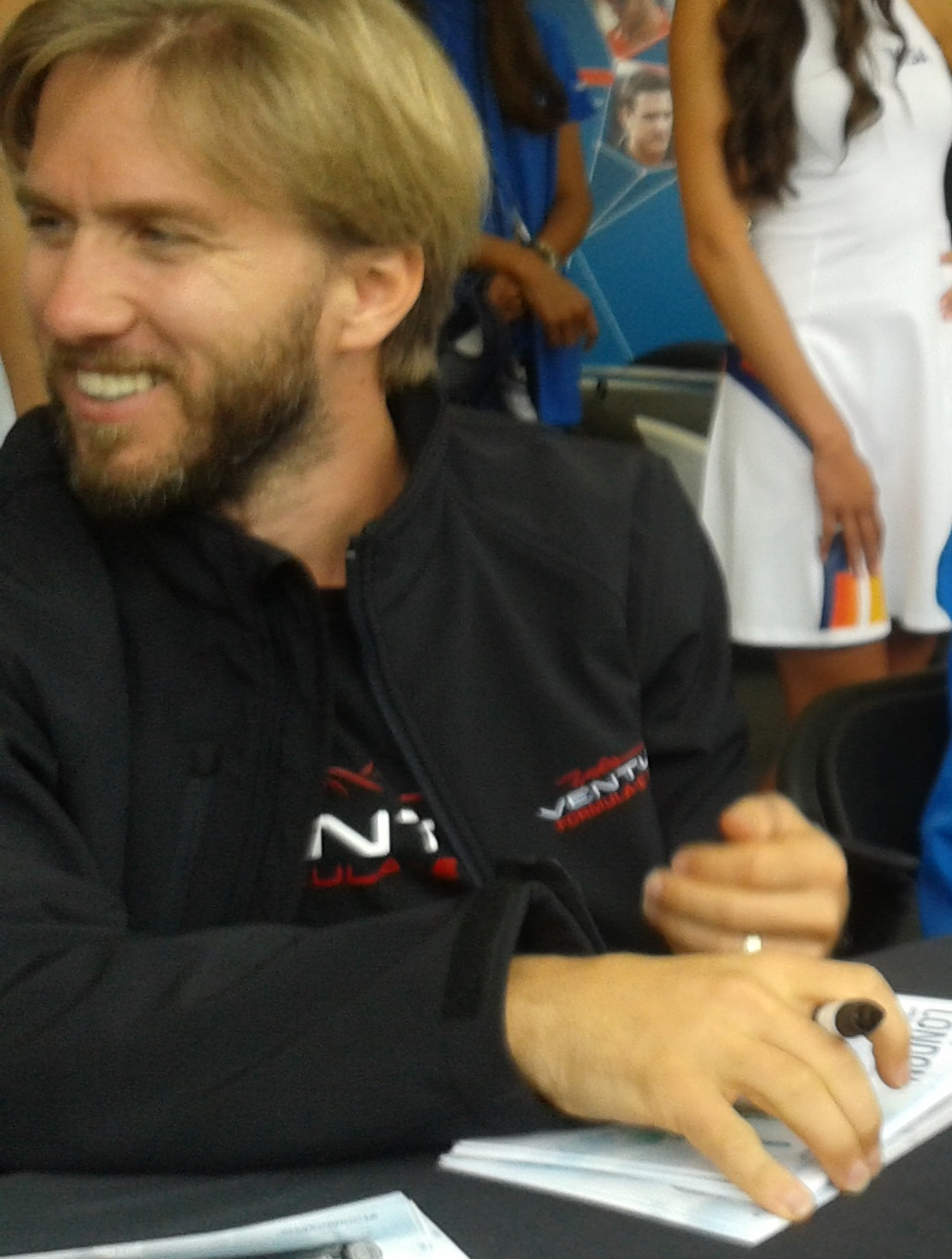
Heidfeld signing autographs at the Battersea Park Street Circuit Formula E weekend, June 2015

On 26 June 2014, Heidfeld signed up for the inaugural season of Formula E for Venturi Grand Prix. In the first race at the 2014 Beijing ePrix, he had a spectacular accident at the final corner on the final lap with e.Dams Renault driver Nicolas Prost whilst fighting for the lead. Prost later accepted the blame for the accident. At the 2014 Putrajaya ePrix, he retired from the race after a collision this time with Franck Montagny but to add insult to injury, he was excluded from the 19th position finish for changing his car outside the permitted area during his pit stop, meaning he cannot count the race as a round where he drops a score.

== Personal life ==
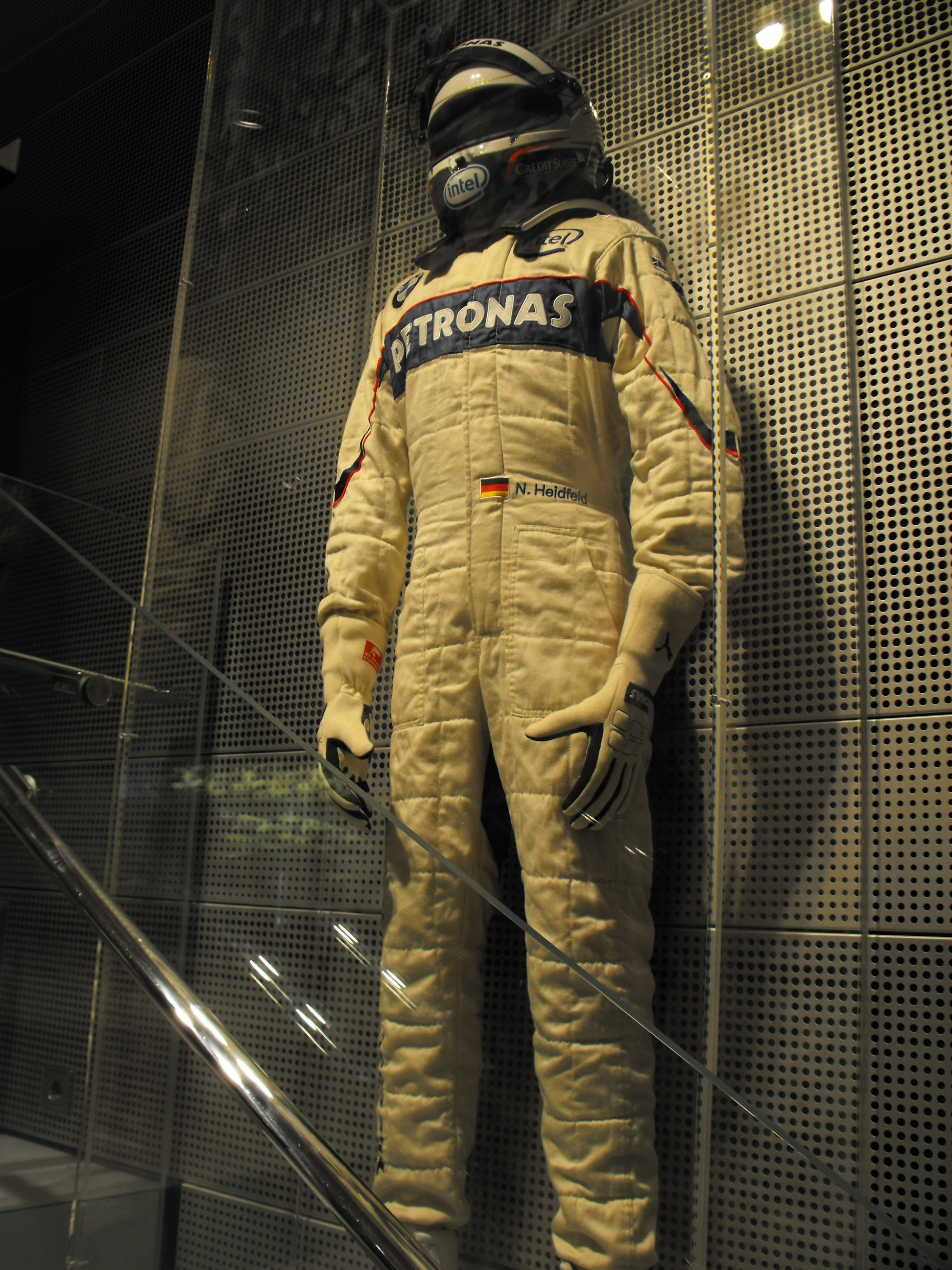
Heidfeld's racing suit

Heidfeld lives in Stäfa, Switzerland with his fiancée, daughter (born 2005), and sons (born 2007, 2010). He has an elder brother, Tim, and a younger brother, Sven, a former racing driver who is now a motorsport commentator for German television.

Heidfeld's nickname to Formula One fans is "Quick Nick", which he got while driving for Williams in 2005.

== Racing record ==
=== Career summary ===
Season	Series	Team	Races	Wins	Poles	F/laps	Podiums	Points	Position
1994	German Formula Ford 1600	?	9	8	?	?	?	?	**1st**
1994	German Formula Ford 1800	Eifelland Racing	?	?	?	?	?	48	10th
1995	German Formula Ford 1800	ADAC Nordrhein Junior Team	?	4	?	?	?	346	**1st**
1995	Formel Ford Zetec Meisterschaft	ADAC Nordrhein Junior Team	?	2	?	?	?	169	**2nd**
1996	German Formula 3 Championship	Opel Team BSR	15	3	3	6	6	138	**3rd**
1996	Masters of Formula 3	Opel Team BSR	1	0	0	0	1	N/A	**3rd**
1996	Macau Grand Prix	Opel Team BSR	1	0	1	0	0	N/A	6th
1996	Monaco Grand Prix Formula 3	Opel Team BSR	1	0	0	0	0	N/A	21st
1997	German Formula 3 Championship	Opel Team BSR	18	5	5	7	11	224	**1st**
1997	Monaco Grand Prix Formula 3	Opel Team BSR	1	1	1	1	1	N/A	**1st**
1997	Masters of Formula 3	Opel Team BSR	1	0	0	0	0	N/A	7th
1998	International Formula 3000	West Competition Team	12	3	2	3	7	58	**2nd**
1998	Formula One	West McLaren Mercedes	Test driver						
1999	International Formula 3000	West Competition Team	10	4	4	6	7	59	**1st**
1999	24 Hours of Le Mans - LMGTP	AMG-Mercedes	1	0	0	0	0	N/A	DNF
1999	Formula One	West McLaren Mercedes	Test driver						
1999	Formula One	Gauloises Prost Peugeot	Test driver						
2000	Formula One	Gauloises Prost Peugeot	17	0	0	0	0	0	20th
2001	Formula One	Red Bull Sauber Petronas	17	0	0	0	1	12	8th
2002	Formula One	Sauber Petronas	17	0	0	0	0	7	10th
2003	Formula One	Sauber Petronas	16	0	0	0	0	6	14th
2004	Formula One	Jordan Ford	18	0	0	0	0	3	18th
2005	Formula One	BMW Williams F1 Team	14	0	1	0	3	28	11th
2006	Formula One	BMW Sauber F1 Team	18	0	0	0	1	23	9th
2007	Formula One	BMW Sauber F1 Team	17	0	0	0	2	61	5th
2008	Formula One	BMW Sauber F1 Team	18	0	0	2	4	60	6th
2009	Formula One	BMW Sauber F1 Team	17	0	0	0	1	19	13th
2010	Formula One	Mercedes GP Petronas F1 Team	Test driver						
2010	Formula One	Pirelli	Test driver						
2010	Formula One	BMW Sauber	5	0	0	0	0	6	18th
2011	Formula One	Lotus Renault GP	11	0	0	0	1	34	11th
2012	FIA World Endurance Championship	Rebellion Racing	3	0	0	0	1	42.5	14th
2012	24 Hours of Le Mans	Rebellion Racing	1	0	0	0	0	N/A	4th
2012	24 Hours of Nürburgring - SP9	Gemballa Racing	1	0	0	0	0	N/A	DNF
2012	V8 Supercars Championship	Rod Nash Racing	2	0	0	0	0	0	NC
2012	Porsche Supercup	Porsche AG	1	0	0	0	0	0	NC†
2013	FIA World Endurance Championship	Rebellion Racing	5	0	0	0	1	48	8th
2013	24 Hours of Le Mans	Rebellion Racing	1	0	0	0	0	N/A	39th
2013	American Le Mans Series - P1	Rebellion Racing	4	1	0	0	4	82	**2nd**
2014	FIA World Endurance Championship	Rebellion Racing	8	0	0	0	0	64.5	10th
2014	24 Hours of Le Mans	Rebellion Racing	1	0	0	0	0	N/A	4th
2014	24 Hours of Nürburgring - SP9	Nissan GT Academy Team RJN	1	0	0	0	0	N/A	13th
2014–15	Formula E	Venturi Grand Prix	11	0	0	0	1	31	12th
2015	FIA World Endurance Championship	Rebellion Racing	3	0	0	0	0	2	29th
2015	24 Hours of Le Mans	Rebellion Racing	1	0	0	0	0	N/A	23rd
2015–16	Formula E	Mahindra Racing	9	0	0	1	1	53	10th
2016	FIA World Endurance Championship	Rebellion Racing	4	0	0	0	0	25.5	14th
2016	24 Hours of Le Mans	Rebellion Racing	1	0	0	0	0	N/A	29th
2016–17	Formula E	Mahindra Racing	12	0	0	0	5	88	7th
2017	WeatherTech SportsCar Championship - Prototype	Rebellion Racing	3	0	0	0	0	68	22nd
2017–18	Formula E	Mahindra Racing	12	0	0	0	1	42	11th
2018–19	Formula E	Mahindra Racing	Reserve driver						
2019–20	Formula E	Mahindra Racing	Reserve driver						
2020–21	Formula E	Mahindra Racing	Reserve driver						
2022	FIA World Rallycross Championship	QEV Motorsport	1	0	0	0	0	6	16th

† As Heidfeld was a guest driver, he was ineligible to score points.

=== Formula racing ===
==== Complete German Formula Three results ====
(key) (Races in bold indicate pole position) (Races in italics indicate fastest lap)

Year	Entrant	Engine	Class	1	2	3	4	5	6	7	8	9	10	11	12	13	14	15	16	17	18	DC	Pts
1996	Opel Team BSR	Opel	A	HOC; 1; 6	HOC; 2 Ret	NÜR; 2	NÜR; 1; 4	NÜR; 2; 4	NOR; 1 Ret	NOR; 2; 3	DIE; 1 Ret	DIE; 2; 11	**NÜR**; **1**; 1	**NÜR**; **2**; 1	MAG; 1; 1	**MAG**; **2**; 2	HOC; 1; 17	HOC; 2; 4				3rd	138
1997	Opel Team BSR	Opel	A	HOC; 1; 1	**HOC**; **2**; 1	NÜR; 1; 2	NÜR; 2; 3	SAC; 1; 2	SAC; 2; 6	NOR; 1 Ret	NOR; 2; 8	WUN; 1; 12	WUN; 2; 4	ZWE; 1; 5	ZWE; 2; 4	**SAL**; **1**; 1	**SAL**; **2**; 1	LAH; 1; 2	LAH; 2; 2	**NÜR**; **1**; 1	**NÜR**; **2**; 2	1st	224

==== International Formula 3000 results ====
(key) (Races in bold indicate pole position; races in italics indicate fastest lap)

Year	Entrant	1	2	3	4	5	6	7	8	9	10	11	12	Pos.	Pts
1998	West Competition	OSC; 2	IMO; 4	CAT; 26	SIL; 2	MON; 1	PAU; 3	A1R; 7	**HOC**; 1	HUN; 1	SPA; 4	**PER**; 2	NÜR; 9	**2nd**	**58**
1999	West Competition	IMO; 1	**MON**; 7	**CAT**; 1	MAG; 1	SIL; 3	**A1R**; 1	HOC; Ret	HUN; 2	SPA; 4	**NÜR**; 2			**1st**	**59**

==== Formula One results ====
(key) (Races in bold indicate pole position; races in italics indicate fastest lap)

Year	Entrant	Chassis	Engine	1	2	3	4	5	6	7	8	9	10	11	12	13	14	15	16	17	18	19	WDC	Pts
2000	Gauloises Prost Peugeot	Prost AP03	Peugeot A20 3.0 V10	AUS; 9	BRA; Ret	SMR; Ret	GBR; Ret	ESP; 16	EUR; EX	MON; 8	CAN; Ret	FRA; 12	AUT; Ret	GER; 12^{†}	HUN; Ret	BEL; Ret	ITA; Ret	USA; 9	JPN; Ret	MAL; Ret			20th	0
2001	Red Bull Sauber Petronas	Sauber C20	Petronas 01A 3.0 V10	AUS; 4	MAL; Ret	BRA; 3	SMR; 7	ESP; 6	AUT; 9	MON; Ret	CAN; Ret	EUR; Ret	FRA; 6	GBR; 6	GER; Ret	HUN; 6	BEL; Ret	ITA; 11	USA; 6	JPN; 9			8th	12
2002	Sauber Petronas	Sauber C21	Petronas 02A 3.0 V10	AUS; Ret	MAL; 5	BRA; Ret	SMR; 10	ESP; 4	AUT; Ret	MON; 8	CAN; 12	EUR; 7	GBR; 6	FRA; 7	GER; 6	HUN; 9	BEL; 10	ITA; 10	USA; 9	JPN; 7			10th	7
2003	Sauber Petronas	Sauber C22	Petronas 03A 3.0 V10	AUS; Ret	MAL; 8	BRA; Ret	SMR; 10	ESP; 10	AUT; Ret	MON; 11	CAN; Ret	EUR; 8	FRA; 13	GBR; 17	GER; 10	HUN; 9	ITA; 9	USA; 5	JPN; 9				14th	6
2004	Jordan Ford	Jordan EJ14	Ford RS2 3.0 V10	AUS; Ret	MAL; Ret	BHR; 15	SMR; Ret	ESP; Ret	MON; 7	EUR; 10	CAN; 8	USA; Ret	FRA; 16	GBR; 15	GER; Ret	HUN; 12	BEL; 11	ITA; 14	CHN; 13	JPN; 13	BRA; Ret		18th	3
2005	BMW WilliamsF1 Team	Williams FW27	BMW P84/5 3.0 V10	AUS; Ret	MAL; 3	BHR; Ret	SMR; 6	ESP; 10	MON; 2	**EUR**; 2	CAN; Ret	USA; DNS	FRA; 14	GBR; 12	GER; 11	HUN; 6	TUR; Ret	ITA; WD	BEL	BRA	JPN	CHN	11th	28
2006	BMW Sauber F1 Team	BMW Sauber F1.06	BMW P86 2.4 V8	BHR; 12	MAL; Ret	AUS; 4	SMR; 13	EUR; 10	ESP; 8	MON; 7	GBR; 7	CAN; 7	USA; Ret	FRA; 8	GER; Ret	HUN; 3	TUR; 14	ITA; 8	CHN; 7	JPN; 8	BRA; 17^{†}		9th	23
2007	BMW Sauber F1 Team	BMW Sauber F1.07	BMW P86/7 2.4 V8	AUS; 4	MAL; 4	BHR; 4	ESP; Ret	MON; 6	CAN; 2	USA; Ret	FRA; 5	GBR; 6	EUR; 6	HUN; 3	TUR; 4	ITA; 4	BEL; 5	JPN; 14^{†}	CHN; 7	BRA; 6			5th	61
2008	BMW Sauber F1 Team	BMW Sauber F1.08	BMW P86/8 2.4 V8	AUS; 2	MAL; 6	BHR; 4	ESP; 9	TUR; 5	MON; 14	CAN; 2	FRA; 13	GBR; 2	GER; 4	HUN; 10	EUR; 9	BEL; 2	ITA; 5	SIN; 6	JPN; 9	CHN; 5	BRA; 10		6th	60
2009	BMW Sauber F1 Team	BMW Sauber F1.09	BMW P86/9 2.4 V8	AUS; 10	MAL; 2^{‡}	CHN; 12	BHR; 19	ESP; 7	MON; 11	TUR; 11	GBR; 15	GER; 10	HUN; 11	EUR; 11	BEL; 5	ITA; 7	SIN; Ret	JPN; 6	BRA; Ret	ABU; 5			13th	19
2010	BMW Sauber F1 Team	Sauber C29	Ferrari 056 2.4 V8	BHR	AUS	MAL	CHN	ESP	MON	TUR	CAN	EUR	GBR	GER	HUN	BEL	ITA	SIN; Ret	JPN; 8	KOR; 9	BRA; 17	ABU; 11	18th	6
2011	Lotus Renault GP	Renault R31	Renault RS27 2.4 V8	AUS; 12	MAL; 3	CHN; 12	TUR; 7	ESP; 8	MON; 8	CAN; Ret	EUR; 10	GBR; 8	GER; Ret	HUN; Ret	BEL	ITA	SIN	JPN	KOR	IND	ABU	BRA	11th	34

^{†} Did not finish, but was classified as he had completed more than 90% of the race distance.
‡ Half points awarded as less than 75% of race distance was completed.

===== Formula One records =====
Heidfeld holds the following Formula One records:

Record	Number	Ref
Most podium finishes without a win	13	
Most second-place finishes without a win	8	

==== Formula E results ====
(key) (Races in bold indicate pole position; races in italics indicate fastest lap)

Year	Entrant	Chassis	Powertrain	1	2	3	4	5	6	7	8	9	10	11	12	Rank	Points
2014–15	Venturi Formula E Team	Spark SRT01-e	SRT01-e	BEI; 13†	PUT; DSQ	PDE; 10	BUE; 8	MIA; 12	LBH; 11	MCO; 10	BER; 5	MSC; 3	LDN; 13	LDN; Ret		12th	31
2015–16	Mahindra Racing	Spark SRT01-e	Mahindra M2ELECTRO	BEI; 3	PUT; 9	PDE	BUE; 7	MEX; 8	LBH; 4	PAR; 12	BER; 7	LDN; 13	LDN; 7			10th	53
2016–17	Mahindra Racing	Spark SRT01-e	Mahindra M3Electro	HKG; 3	MRK; 9	BUE; 15	MEX; 12	MCO; 3	PAR; 3	BER; 3	BER; 10	NYC; Ret	NYC; 3	MTL; Ret	MTL; 5	7th	88
2017–18	Mahindra Racing	Spark SRT01-e	Mahindra M4Electro	HKG; 3	HKG; 16	MRK; 7	SCL; Ret	MEX; Ret	PDE; Ret	RME; 16	PAR; 11	BER; 10	ZUR; 6	NYC; 6	NYC; 8	11th	42

===== Formula E records =====
Heidfeld co-holds the following Formula E record:

Record	Number
Most podium finishes without a win	8

=== Endurance racing ===
==== Le Mans 24 Hours results ====
Year	Entrant	Co-drivers	Car	Class	Laps	Pos.	Class pos.
1999	(Germany) AMG-Mercedes	(France) Christophe Bouchut (United Kingdom) Peter Dumbreck	Mercedes-Benz CLR	LMGTP	75	DNF	DNF
2012	(Switzerland) Rebellion Racing	(France) Nicolas Prost (Switzerland) Neel Jani	Lola B12/60-Toyota	LMP1	367	4th	4th
2013	(Switzerland) Rebellion Racing	(France) Nicolas Prost (Switzerland) Neel Jani	Lola B12/60-Toyota	LMP1	275	39th	7th
2014	(Switzerland) Rebellion Racing	(France) Nicolas Prost (Switzerland) Mathias Beche	Rebellion R-One-Toyota	LMP1-L	360	4th	**1st**
2015	(Switzerland) Rebellion Racing	(France) Nicolas Prost (Switzerland) Mathias Beche	Rebellion R-One-AER	LMP1	330	23rd	10th
2016	(Switzerland) Rebellion Racing	(Brazil) Nelson Piquet Jr. (France) Nicolas Prost	Rebellion R-One-AER	LMP1	330	29th	6th

==== FIA World Endurance Championship results ====
Year	Entrant	Class	Chassis	Engine	1	2	3	4	5	6	7	8	9	Rank	Points
2012	Rebellion Racing	LMP1	Lola B12/60	Toyota RV8KLM 3.4 L V8	SEB; 17	SPA; 5	LMS; 3	SIL	SÃO	BHR	FUJ	SHA		14th	42.5
2013	Rebellion Racing	LMP1	Lola B12/60	Toyota RV8KLM 3.4 L V8	SIL; 5	SPA; 5	LMS; 20	SÃO; 3	COA; 4	FUJ	SHA	BHR		8th	48
2014	Rebellion Racing	LMP1	Lola B12/60	Toyota RV8KLM 3.4 L V8	SIL; 4	SPA; 7	LMS; 4	COA; 7	FUJ; 12	SHA; 7	BHR; 7	SÃO; 8		10th	64.5
2015	Rebellion Racing	LMP1	Rebellion R-One	AER P60 2.4 L Turbo V6	SIL	SPA	LMS; 19	NÜR; 16	COA; 15	FUJ	SHA	BHR		29th	2
2016	Rebellion Racing	LMP1	Rebellion R-One	AER P60 2.4 L Turbo V6	SIL; 4	SPA; 4	LMS; 13	NÜR; 17	MEX	COA	FUJ	SHA	BHR	14th	25.5

==== American Le Mans Series results ====
Year	Entrant	Class	Chassis	Engine	1	2	3	4	5	6	7	8	9	10	Rank	Points	Ref
2013	Rebellion Racing	P1	Lola B12/60	Toyota RV8KLM 3.4 L V8	SEB; 3	LBH; 2	LAG; 2	LRP	MOS	ROA	BAL	COA	VIR	ATL; 1	**2nd**	**82**	

==== IMSA SportsCar Championship results ====
Year	Entrant	Class	Chassis	Engine	1	2	3	4	5	6	7	8	9	10	Rank	Points
2017	Rebellion Racing	P	Oreca 07	Gibson GK428 4.2 L V8	DAY; 8	SEB; 9	LBH	COA	DET	WGL	MOS	ELK	LGA	PET; 8	22nd	68

=== Complete FIA World Rallycross Championship results ===
(key)

==== RX2e ====
Year	Entrant	Car	1	2	3	4	5	WRX	Points
2022	QEV Motorsport	ZEROID X1	SWE	NOR	LAT	BEL	CAT; 10	16th	6

== Footnotes ==
Sporting positions
Preceded by Mario Hilgert	German Formula Ford 1800; Champion; 1995	Succeeded by Tomáš Enge
Preceded by Marcel Tiemann	Monaco Formula Three Support; Race winner 1997	Succeeded by Lewis Hamilton (2005)
Preceded by Jarno Trulli	German Formula Three Champion; 1997	Succeeded by Bas Leinders
Preceded by Juan Pablo Montoya	International Formula 3000; Champion; 1999	Succeeded by Bruno Junqueira
Trade union offices
Preceded by Pedro de la Rosa	GPDA chairman 2010	Succeeded by Rubens Barrichello
