= 2004 Hockenheimring F3000 round =

- Race 7 of 10 in the 2004 International Formula 3000 Championship

Race details
- Date: 24 July 2004
- Location: Hockenheimring, Hockenheim, Baden-Württemberg, Germany
- Course: Permanent racing facility
- Course length: 4.574 km (2.842 miles)
- Distance: 33 laps, 150.942 km (93.795 miles)

Pole position
Driver	(Italy) Vitantonio Liuzzi	Arden International
- Time: 1:31.092

Fastest lap
Driver	(Italy) Enrico Toccacelo	BCN Competicion
- Time: 1:30.591 on lap 22

Podium
First	(Italy) Vitantonio Liuzzi	Arden International
Second	(Italy) Enrico Toccacelo	BCN Competicion
Third	(Argentina) Esteban Guerrieri	BCN Competicion

The 2004 Hockenheimring F3000 round was a motor racing event held on 24 July 2004 at the Hockenheimring, Germany. It was the seventh round of the 2004 International Formula 3000 Championship, and was held in support of the 2004 German Grand Prix.

== Classification ==
=== Qualifying ===
Pos.	No.	Driver	Team	Time	Gap	Grid
1	1	(Italy) Vitantonio Liuzzi	Arden International	1:31.092		1
2	14	(Italy) Enrico Toccacelo	BCN Competicion	1:31.402	+0.310	2
3	7	(Austria) Patrick Friesacher	Coloni Motorsport	1:31.406	+0.314	3
4	17	(Czech Republic) Tomáš Enge	Ma-Con Engineering	1:31.477	+0.385	4
5	5	(France) Yannick Schroeder	Durango	1:31.652	+0.342	5
6	15	(Argentina) Esteban Guerrieri	BCN Competicion	1:31.657	+0.565	6
7	2	(Monaco) Robert Doornbos	Arden International	1:31.717	+0.625	7
8	16	(Germany) Tony Schmidt	Ma-Con Engineering	1:31.832	+0.740	8
9	18	(Italy) Raffaele Giammaria	AEZ Racing	1:31.873	+0.781	9
10	6	(Venezuela) Ernesto Viso	Durango	1:31.970	+0.878	10
11	10	(South Africa) Alan van der Merwe	Super Nova Racing	1:31.997	+0.905	11
12	4	(Austria) Mathias Lauda	CMS Performance	1:32.070	+0.978	12
13	3	(Argentina) José María López	CMS Performance	1:32.125	+1.033	13
14	19	(Italy) Ferdinando Monfardini	AEZ Racing	1:32.689	+1.597	14
15	9	(Belgium) Jeffrey van Hooydonk	Super Nova Racing	1:33.190	+2.098	15
16	11	(Belgium) Nico Verdonck	Team Astromega	1:33.258	+2.166	16
17	8	(Turkey) Can Artam	Coloni Motorsport	1:33.884	+2.792	17
18	11	(Netherlands) Olivier Tielemans	Team Astromega	1:34.317	+3.225	18
Lähde:

=== Race ===
Pos	No	Driver	Team	Laps	Time/Retired	Grid	Points
1	1	(Italy) Vitantonio Liuzzi	Arden International	33	51:01.849	1	10
2	14	(Italy) Enrico Toccacelo	BCN Competicion	33	+6.699	2	8
3	15	(Argentina) Esteban Guerrieri	BCN Competicion	33	+12.713	6	6
4	2	(Monaco) Robert Doornbos	Arden International	33	+15.121	7	5
5	16	(Germany) Tony Schmidt	Ma-Con Engineering	33	+15.499	8	4
6	3	(Argentina) José María López	CMS Performance	33	+26.352	13	3
7	6	(Venezuela) Ernesto Viso	Durango	33	+1:09.623	10	2
8	11	(Belgium) Nico Verdonck	Team Astromega	33	+1:24.420	16	1
9	9	(Belgium) Jeffrey van Hooydonk	Super Nova Racing	33	+1:25.679	15	
10	8	(Turkey) Can Artam	Coloni Motorsport	33	+1:32.240	17	
11	10	(South Africa) Alan van der Merwe	Super Nova Racing	32	+1 lap	11	
12	12	(Netherlands) Olivier Tielemans	Team Astromega	32	+1 lap	18	
Ret	4	(Austria) Mathias Lauda	CMS Performance	23	Retired	12	
Ret	5	(France) Yannick Schroeder	Durango	1	Retired	5	
Ret	18	(Italy) Raffaele Giammaria	AEZ Racing	1	Retired	9	
Ret	17	(Czech Republic) Tomáš Enge	Ma-Con Engineering	0	Retired	4	
Ret	19	(Italy) Ferdinando Monfardini	AEZ Racing	0	Retired	14	
DNS	7	(Austria) Patrick Friesacher	Coloni Motorsport	0	Did not start	3	
Lähde:

== Standings after the event ==
Drivers' Championship standings

	Pos.	Driver	Points
	1	(Italy) Vitantonio Liuzzi	60
	2	(Italy) Enrico Toccacelo	50
1	3	(Monaco) Robert Doornbos	26
1	4	(Italy) Raffaele Gianmaria	22
2	5	(Argentina) José María López	21

Teams' Championship standings

	Pos.	Team	Points
	1	(United Kingdom) Arden International	86
	2	(Spain) BCN Competicion	68
	3	(Germany) Ma-Con Engineering	28
1	4	(Italy) CMS Performance	23
1	5	(Italy) AEZ Racing	22

- Note: Only the top five positions are included for both sets of standings.

== See also ==
- 2004 German Grand Prix

Previous round: 2004 Silverstone F3000 round	International Formula 3000 Championship; 2004 season	Next round: 2004 Hungaroring F3000 round
Previous round: 2003 Hockenheimring F3000 round	Hockenheimring F3000 round	Next round: 2005 Hockenheimring GP2 Series round
