= 2004 British Grand Prix =

Formula One motor race

Coordinates: 52°04′43″N 1°01′01″W

Race 11 of 18 in the 2004 Formula One World Championship
| ← Previous race | Next race → |
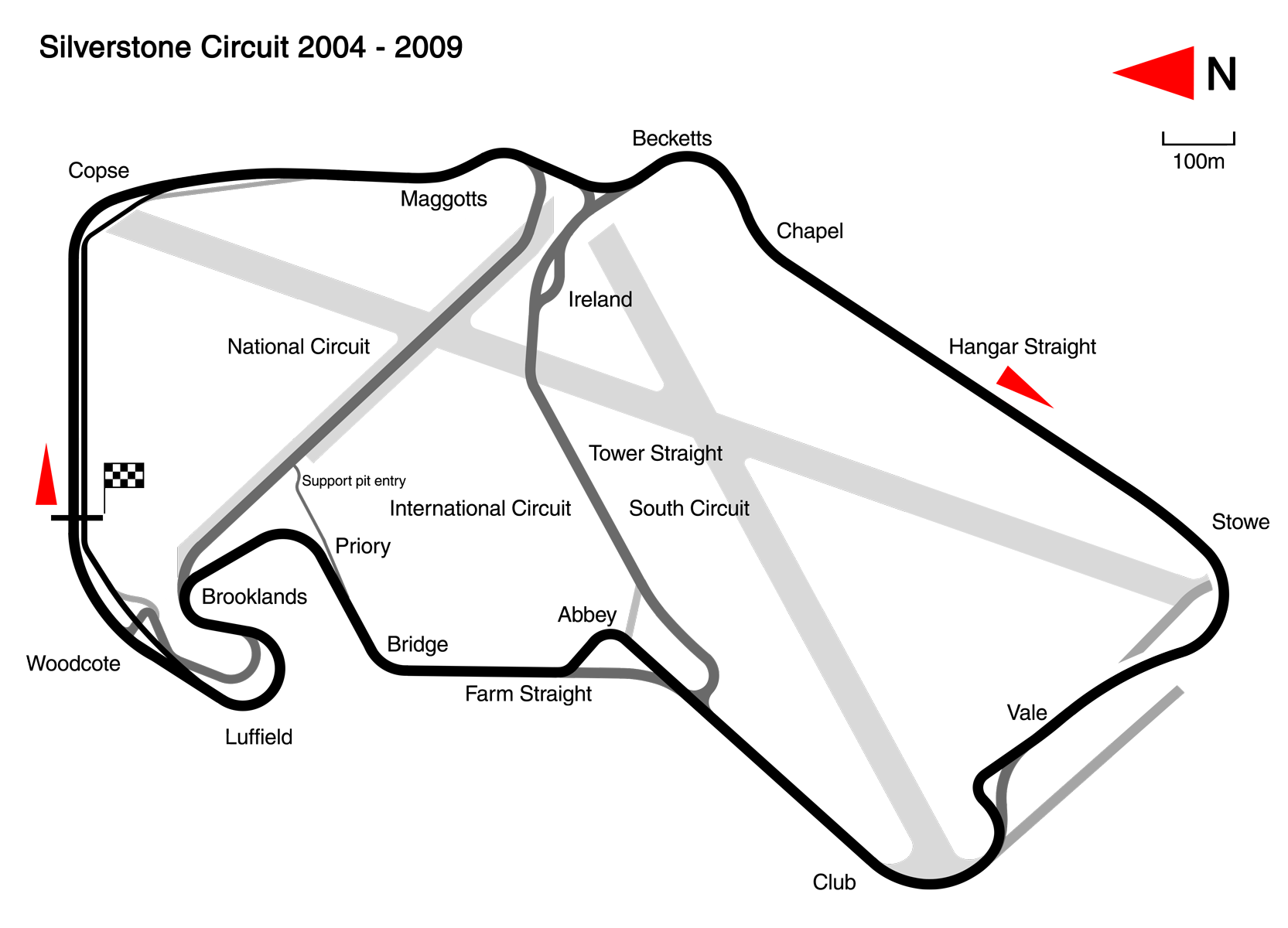
- Silverstone Circuit in its 2004 configuration

Race details
- Date: 11 July 2004
- Official name: 2004 Formula 1 Foster's British Grand Prix
- Location: Silverstone Circuit, Silverstone, Northamptonshire and Buckinghamshire, England
- Course: Permanent Road Facility
- Course length: 5.141 km (3.194 miles)
- Distance: 60 laps, 308.355 km (191.603 miles)
- Weather: Cloudy, Air: 17 °C (63 °F), Track 27 °C (81 °F)

Pole position
| Driver | (Finland) Kimi Räikkönen | McLaren-Mercedes |
- Time: 1:18.233

Fastest lap
| Driver | (Germany) Michael Schumacher | Ferrari |
- Time: 1:18.739 on lap 14

Podium
| First | (Germany) Michael Schumacher | Ferrari |
| Second | (Finland) Kimi Räikkönen | McLaren-Mercedes |
| Third | (Brazil) Rubens Barrichello | Ferrari |

The 2004 British Grand Prix (formally known as the 2004 Formula 1 Foster's British Grand Prix) was a Formula One motor race that took place on 11 July 2004 at the Silverstone Circuit in Northamptonshire, England. It was the eleventh round of the 2004 FIA Formula One World Championship.

Kimi Räikkönen of McLaren scored his first pole position of the season, but finished second in the race behind championship leader Michael Schumacher of Ferrari, the German continuing his winning streak with five Grands Prix in a row, just like he did at the start of the year.

== Background ==
The race was preceded by a demonstration of contemporary Formula One cars on Regent Street in London, including former British Formula One World Champion Nigel Mansell driving the Jordan EJ14. The event attracted an estimated 500,000 spectators.

After the demonstration, Minardi's Sporting Director John Walton died of a heart attack. Minardi decided to withdraw its cars from the third practice session on Saturday morning.

== Practice ==
Four free practice sessions were held for the event. On Friday, the first session was topped by the Ferraris of Rubens Barrichello and Michael Schumacher. The second session saw McLaren's Kimi Räikkönen on top, just five thousands ahead of Giancarlo Fisichella in the Sauber.

On Saturday, Räikkönen topped the third session as well, ahead of Jenson Button in the BAR. And both drivers repeated their feats in the fourth and final session.

=== Friday drivers ===
The bottom 6 teams in the 2003 Constructors' Championship were entitled to run a third car in free practice on Friday. These drivers drove on Friday but did not compete in qualifying or the race.

| Constructor | Nat | Driver |
|---|---|---|
| BAR-Honda | (United Kingdom) | Anthony Davidson |
| Sauber-Petronas | | - |
| Jaguar-Cosworth | (Sweden) | Björn Wirdheim |
| Toyota | (Brazil) | Ricardo Zonta |
| Jordan-Ford | (Germany) | Timo Glock |
| Minardi-Cosworth | (Belgium) | Bas Leinders |

== Qualifying ==
Qualifying on Saturday consisted of two sessions. In the first session, drivers went out one by one in the order in which they classified at the previous race. Each driver was allowed to set one lap time. The result determined the running order in the second session: the fastest driver in the first session was allowed to go last in the second session, which usually provided the benefit of a cleaner track. In the second session, drivers were again allowed to set one lap time, which determined the order on the grid for the race on Sunday, with the fastest driver scoring pole position.

On this particular weekend, the first qualifying session was unusual. Teams were expecting rain later that day, so they were deliberately going slow in the first session, aiming for an early slot in the second session. Michael Schumacher spun his car and Rubens Barrichello went wide at Vale corner. Other drivers simply and unsubtly lifted off in the final sector, cruising across the start-finish line at walking pace. Eventually, the rain never came.

| Pos | No | Driver | Constructor | Q1 Time | Q2 Time | Gap | Grid |
|---|---|---|---|---|---|---|---|
| 1 | 6 | (Finland) Kimi Räikkönen | McLaren-Mercedes | 1:21.639 | 1:18.233 | — | 1 |
| 2 | 2 | (Brazil) Rubens Barrichello | Ferrari | 1:24.817 | 1:18.305 | +0.072 | 2 |
| 3 | 9 | (United Kingdom) Jenson Button | BAR-Honda | 1:18.872 | 1:18.580 | +0.347 | 3 |
| 4 | 1 | (Germany) Michael Schumacher | Ferrari | 1:30.293 | 1:18.710 | +0.477 | 4 |
| 5 | 7 | (Italy) Jarno Trulli | Renault | 1:21.496 | 1:18.715 | +0.482 | 5 |
| 6 | 8 | (Spain) Fernando Alonso | Renault | 1:21.923 | 1:18.811 | +0.578 | 16^{1} |
| 7 | 5 | (United Kingdom) David Coulthard | McLaren-Mercedes | 1:23.521 | 1:19.148 | +0.915 | 6 |
| 8 | 3 | (Colombia) Juan Pablo Montoya | Williams-BMW | 1:34.386 | 1:19.378 | +1.145 | 7 |
| 9 | 10 | (Japan) Takuma Sato | BAR-Honda | 1:28.910 | 1:19.688 | +1.455 | 8 |
| 10 | 14 | (Australia) Mark Webber | Jaguar-Cosworth | 1:35.853 | 1:20.004 | +1.771 | 9 |
| 11 | 12 | (Brazil) Felipe Massa | Sauber-Petronas | 1:19.317 | 1:20.202 | +1.969 | 10 |
| 12 | 17 | (France) Olivier Panis | Toyota | 1:19.697 | 1:20.335 | +2.102 | 17^{2} |
| 13 | 4 | (Spain) Marc Gené | Williams-BMW | 1:34.981 | 1:20.335 | +2.102 | 11 |
| 14 | 16 | (Brazil) Cristiano da Matta | Toyota | 1:22.507 | 1:20.545 | +2.312 | 12 |
| 15 | 15 | (Austria) Christian Klien | Jaguar-Cosworth | 1:38.648 | 1:21.559 | +3.326 | 13 |
| 16 | 19 | (Italy) Giorgio Pantano | Jordan-Ford | 1:21.350 | 1:22.458 | +4.225 | 14 |
| 17 | 18 | (Germany) Nick Heidfeld | Jordan-Ford | No time^{3} | 1:22.677 | +4.444 | 15 |
| 18 | 20 | (Italy) Gianmaria Bruni | Minardi-Cosworth | 1:22.529 | 1:23.437 | +5.204 | 18^{1} |
| 19 | 21 | (Hungary) Zsolt Baumgartner | Minardi-Cosworth | 1:23.116 | 1:24.117 | +5.884 | 19^{1} |
| 20 | 11 | (Italy) Giancarlo Fisichella | Sauber-Petronas | No time^{4} | No time^{4} | | 20^{1} |

Notes

- ^1 – Fernando Alonso, Gianmaria Bruni, Zsolt Baumgartner and Giancarlo Fisichella received a 10-place grid penalty for engine changes.
- ^2 – Olivier Panis received a 5-place grid penalty for impeding Felipe Massa.
- ^3 – Nick Heidfeld did not set a time in Q1 because he hoped for rain in Q2.
- ^4 – Giancarlo Fisichella did not set a time in either section to save fuel and tyres.

== Race ==
The race was held on 11 July 2004 and was run for 60 laps.

=== Race report ===
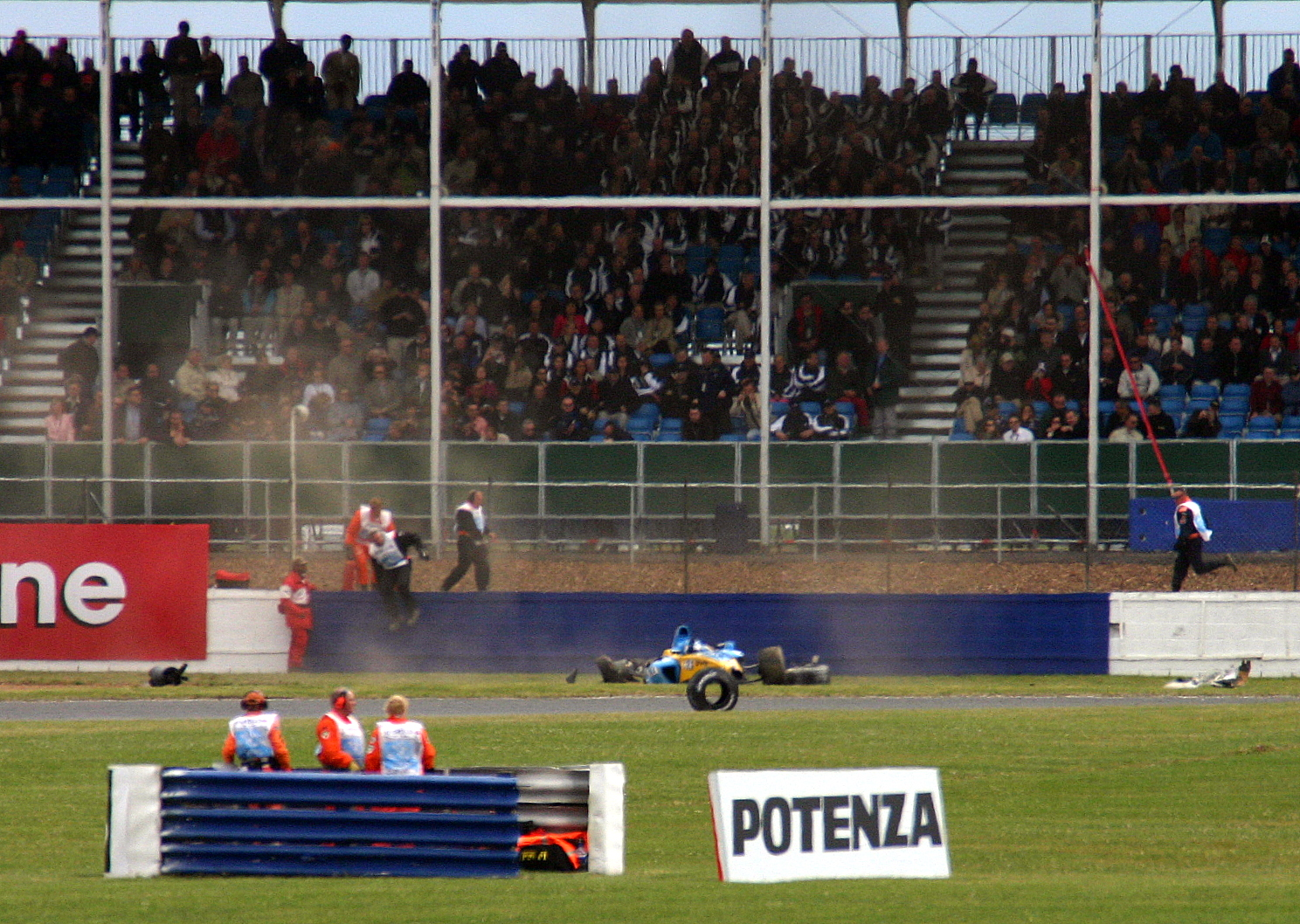
Jarno Trulli lost control at Bridge Corner and crashed heavily.

The race started off relatively calm with Kimi Räikkönen managing to hold on to the lead ahead of Rubens Barrichello and Jenson Button. Räikkönen showed the best pace, while being able to hold out two more laps before pitting. But it was Michael Schumacher, starting in fourth, who set five consecutive fastest laps while the frontrunners stopped and he managed to open up a gap of more than 20 seconds to his rivals. When the German pitted and rejoined the race on lap 16, it turned out he had jumped ahead of all three drivers and merged into the lead of the race.

Räikkönen tried to put pressure on Schumacher but the McLaren had to pit again on lap 28, while the Ferrari could go on to lap 37. Meanwhile, Button had passed Barrichello in the first round of stops, but the Brazilian was back in front after the second round. Giancarlo Fisichella in the Sauber looked set for an impressive fifth place.

On lap 39, Jarno Trulli had a big crash coming out of Bridge corner. His rear suspension seemed to have failed and his car rolled over into the gravel. Trulli was unhurt but the tyre barrier needed repairing, so the safety car was deployed. This gave Räikkönen the chance to close all the way up to Schumacher, but after the restart, he was unable to match the leader's pace and he had to settle for second. Barrichello completed the podium. Fisichella lost out to Juan Pablo Montoya but scored a respectable sixth place at the finish.

=== Race classification ===
| Pos | No | Driver | Constructor | Tyre | Laps | Time/Retired | Grid | Points |
|---|---|---|---|---|---|---|---|---|
| 1 | 1 | (Germany) Michael Schumacher | Ferrari | B | 60 | 1:24:42.700 | 4 | 10 |
| 2 | 6 | (Finland) Kimi Räikkönen | McLaren-Mercedes | M | 60 | +2.130 | 1 | 8 |
| 3 | 2 | (Brazil) Rubens Barrichello | Ferrari | B | 60 | +3.114 | 2 | 6 |
| 4 | 9 | (United Kingdom) Jenson Button | BAR-Honda | M | 60 | +10.683 | 3 | 5 |
| 5 | 3 | (Colombia) Juan Pablo Montoya | Williams-BMW | M | 60 | +12.173 | 7 | 4 |
| 6 | 11 | (Italy) Giancarlo Fisichella | Sauber-Petronas | B | 60 | +12.888 | 20 | 3 |
| 7 | 5 | (United Kingdom) David Coulthard | McLaren-Mercedes | M | 60 | +19.668 | 6 | 2 |
| 8 | 14 | (Australia) Mark Webber | Jaguar-Cosworth | M | 60 | +23.701 | 9 | 1 |
| 9 | 12 | (Brazil) Felipe Massa | Sauber-Petronas | B | 60 | +24.023 | 10 | |
| 10 | 8 | (Spain) Fernando Alonso | Renault | M | 60 | +24.835 | 16 | |
| 11 | 10 | (Japan) Takuma Sato | BAR-Honda | M | 60 | +33.736 | 8 | |
| 12 | 4 | (Spain) Marc Gené | Williams-BMW | M | 60 | +34.303 | 11 | |
| 13 | 16 | (Brazil) Cristiano da Matta | Toyota | M | 59 | +1 Lap | 12 | |
| 14 | 15 | (Austria) Christian Klien | Jaguar-Cosworth | M | 59 | +1 Lap | 13 | |
| 15 | 18 | (Germany) Nick Heidfeld | Jordan-Ford | B | 59 | +1 Lap | 15 | |
| 16 | 20 | (Italy) Gianmaria Bruni | Minardi-Cosworth | B | 56 | +4 Laps | 18 | |
| Ret | 19 | (Italy) Giorgio Pantano | Jordan-Ford | B | 47 | Spin | 14 | |
| Ret | 7 | (Italy) Jarno Trulli | Renault | M | 39 | Suspension/Accident | 5 | |
| Ret | 21 | (Hungary) Zsolt Baumgartner | Minardi-Cosworth | B | 29 | Engine | 19 | |
| Ret | 17 | (France) Olivier Panis | Toyota | M | 16 | Fire Extinguisher | 17 | |

== Championship standings after the race ==
- Bold text and an asterisk indicates who still has a theoretical chance of becoming World Champion.

Drivers' Championship standings

| Pos | Driver | Points |
|---|---|---|
| 1 | (Germany) Michael Schumacher* | 100 |
| 2 | (Brazil) Rubens Barrichello* | 74 |
| 3 | (United Kingdom) Jenson Button* | 53 |
| 4 | (Italy) Jarno Trulli* | 46 |
| 5 | (Spain) Fernando Alonso* | 33 |

Constructors' Championship standings

| Pos | Constructor | Points |
|---|---|---|
| 1 | (Italy) Ferrari* | 174 |
| 2 | (France) Renault* | 79 |
| 3 | (United Kingdom) BAR-Honda* | 67 |
| 4 | (United Kingdom) Williams-BMW | 41 |
| 5 | (United Kingdom) McLaren-Mercedes | 32 |

- Only the top five positions are included for both sets of standings.

== See also ==
- 2004 Silverstone F3000 round

| Previous race: 2004 French Grand Prix | FIA Formula One World Championship; 2004 season | Next race: 2004 German Grand Prix |
| Previous race: 2003 British Grand Prix | British Grand Prix | Next race: 2005 British Grand Prix |
