= 2004 German Grand Prix =

Coordinates: 49°19′40″N 8°33′57″E

Race 12 of 18 in the 2004 Formula One World Championship
← Previous race	Next race →

Race details
- Date: 25 July 2004
- Official name: Formula 1 Grosser Mobil 1 Preis von Deutschland 2004
- Location: Hockenheimring; Hockenheim, Baden-Württemberg, Germany
- Course: Permanent racing facility
- Course length: 4.574 km (2.842 miles)
- Distance: 66 laps, 301.884 km (187.582 miles)
- Scheduled distance: 67 laps, 306.458 km (190.424 miles)
- Weather: Sunny

Pole position
Driver	(Germany) Michael Schumacher	Ferrari
- Time: 1:13.306

Fastest lap
Driver	(Finland) Kimi Räikkönen	McLaren-Mercedes
- Time: 1:13.780 on lap 10 (lap record) (Note: Although Michael Schumacher set a lap time of 1:13.306 in qualifying, Kimi Räikkönen's time of 1:13.780 is recognised as the lap record as it was set under race conditions.)

Podium
First	(Germany) Michael Schumacher	Ferrari
Second	(United Kingdom) Jenson Button	BAR-Honda
Third	(Spain) Fernando Alonso	Renault

The 2004 German Grand Prix (officially known as the Formula 1 Grosser Mobil 1 Preis von Deutschland 2004) was a Formula One motor race that took place on 25 July 2004 at the Hockenheimring in Germany. It was the twelfth round of the 2004 FIA Formula One World Championship.

Michael Schumacher of Scuderia Ferrari took pole position for the race and went on to win the race ahead of Jenson Button of BAR and Fernando Alonso of Renault. This was the final Grand Prix for Brazilian driver Cristiano da Matta, and the final time Williams used the 'Walrus nose' on its FW26 racing car.

== Background ==
The Hockenheimring in Hockenheim, Germany hosted a Formula One Grand Prix for the 28th time in the circuit's history, across the weekend of 23–25 July. The Grand Prix was the twelfth round of the 2004 Formula One World Championship and the 52nd running of the German Grand Prix as a round of the Formula One World Championship.

=== Championship standings before the race ===
Going into the weekend, Michael Schumacher led the Drivers' Championship with 100 points, built up of 10 victories in 11 races. He was 26 points ahead of his teammate Rubens Barrichello in second, and 47 ahead of Jenson Button in third. Ferrari, with 174 points, led the Constructors' Championship from Renault and BAR-Honda, who were second and third with 79 and 67 points, respectively.

=== Driver changes ===
In the previous two races, Marc Gené had stepped in for Williams driver Ralf Schumacher. Schumacher was still recovering from his back injury at the United States Grand Prix and Gené did not provide the necessary results, so the team decided to promote their other test driver, Antônio Pizzonia, into the race seat.

== Practice ==
Four free practice sessions were held for the event. The first session on Friday was topped by BAR's third driver Anthony Davidson, followed by Michael Schumacher in the Ferrari and Kimi Räikkönen for McLaren. The latter two reached the top of the standings in the second session.

On Saturday, Schumacher again set the quickest time in the third practice session, ahead of Juan Pablo Montoya for Williams and teammate Rubens Barrichello. Montoya was second again in the fourth and final session, this time headed by BAR's Jenson Button.

=== Friday drivers ===
The bottom 6 teams in the 2003 Constructors' Championship were entitled to run a third car in free practice on Friday. These drivers drove on Friday but did not compete in qualifying or the race.

Constructor	Nat	Driver
BAR-Honda	(United Kingdom)	Anthony Davidson
Sauber-Petronas		-
Jaguar-Cosworth	(Sweden)	Björn Wirdheim
Toyota	(Brazil)	Ricardo Zonta
Jordan-Ford	(Germany)	Timo Glock
Minardi-Cosworth	(Belgium)	Bas Leinders

== Qualifying ==
Qualifying on Saturday consisted of two sessions. In the first session, drivers went out one by one in the order in which they classified at the previous race. Each driver was allowed to set one lap time. The result determined the running order in the second session: the fastest driver in the first session was allowed to go last in the second session, which usually provided the benefit of a cleaner track. In the second session, drivers were again allowed to set one lap time, which determined the order on the grid for the race on Sunday, with the fastest driver scoring pole position.

Michael Schumacher scored his sixth pole position of the season, ahead of Juan Pablo Montoya and Jenson Button, to make his 100th start from the front row. Button was demoted 10 places on the grid for replacing the engine after Friday's second practice, so Kimi Räikkönen moved up to the third slot. Toyota brought a new car, the TF104B, but were still working on perfecting their aerodynamic set-up, as demonstrated by their tenth and fifteenth positions. Antônio Pizzonia's first qualifying in a Williams was met with mixed reviews: his time in the first qualifying session would have put him second on the grid, but when it mattered in the second session, he failed to reach higher than eleventh place.

Pos	No	Driver	Constructor	Q1 Time	Q2 Time	Gap	Grid
1	1	(Germany) Michael Schumacher	Ferrari	1:14.042	1:13.306		1
2	3	(Colombia) Juan Pablo Montoya	Williams-BMW	1:13.391	1:13.668	+0.362	2
3	9	(United Kingdom) Jenson Button	BAR-Honda	1:13.535	1:13.674	+0.368	13^{1}
4	6	(Finland) Kimi Räikkönen	McLaren-Mercedes	1:13.842	1:13.690	+0.384	3
5	5	(United Kingdom) David Coulthard	McLaren-Mercedes	1:13.640	1:13.821	+0.515	4
6	8	(Spain) Fernando Alonso	Renault	1:13.582	1:13.874	+0.568	5
7	7	(Italy) Jarno Trulli	Renault	1:13.737	1:14.134	+0.828	6
8	2	(Brazil) Rubens Barrichello	Ferrari	1:14.111	1:14.278	+0.972	7
9	10	(Japan) Takuma Sato	BAR-Honda	1:14.465	1:14.287	+0.981	8
10	17	(France) Olivier Panis	Toyota	1:13.641	1:14.368	+1.062	9
11	4	(Brazil) Antônio Pizzonia	Williams-BMW	1:13.422	1:14.556	+1.250	10
12	14	(Australia) Mark Webber	Jaguar-Cosworth	1:15.093	1:14.802	+1.496	11
13	15	(Austria) Christian Klien	Jaguar-Cosworth	1:15.090	1:15.011	+1.705	12
14	11	(Italy) Giancarlo Fisichella	Sauber-Petronas	1:13.914	1:15.395	+2.089	14
15	16	(Brazil) Cristiano da Matta	Toyota	1:15.119	1:15.454	+2.148	15
16	12	(Brazil) Felipe Massa	Sauber-Petronas	1:13.899	1:15.616	+2.310	16
17	19	(Italy) Giorgio Pantano	Jordan-Ford	1:16.167	1:16.192	+2.886	17
18	18	(Germany) Nick Heidfeld	Jordan-Ford	1:16.538	1:16.310	+3.004	18
19	20	(Italy) Gianmaria Bruni	Minardi-Cosworth	1:17.283	1:18.055	+4.749	19
20	21	(Hungary) Zsolt Baumgartner	Minardi-Cosworth	1:17.515	1:18.400	+5.094	20

Notes

- ^1 – Jenson Button received a 10-place grid penalty for an engine change.

== Race ==
The race was held on 25 July 2004 and was due to run for 67 laps, but when Olivier Panis stalled his engine on the grid and the first start had to be aborted, the race was shortened to 66 laps.

=== Race report ===
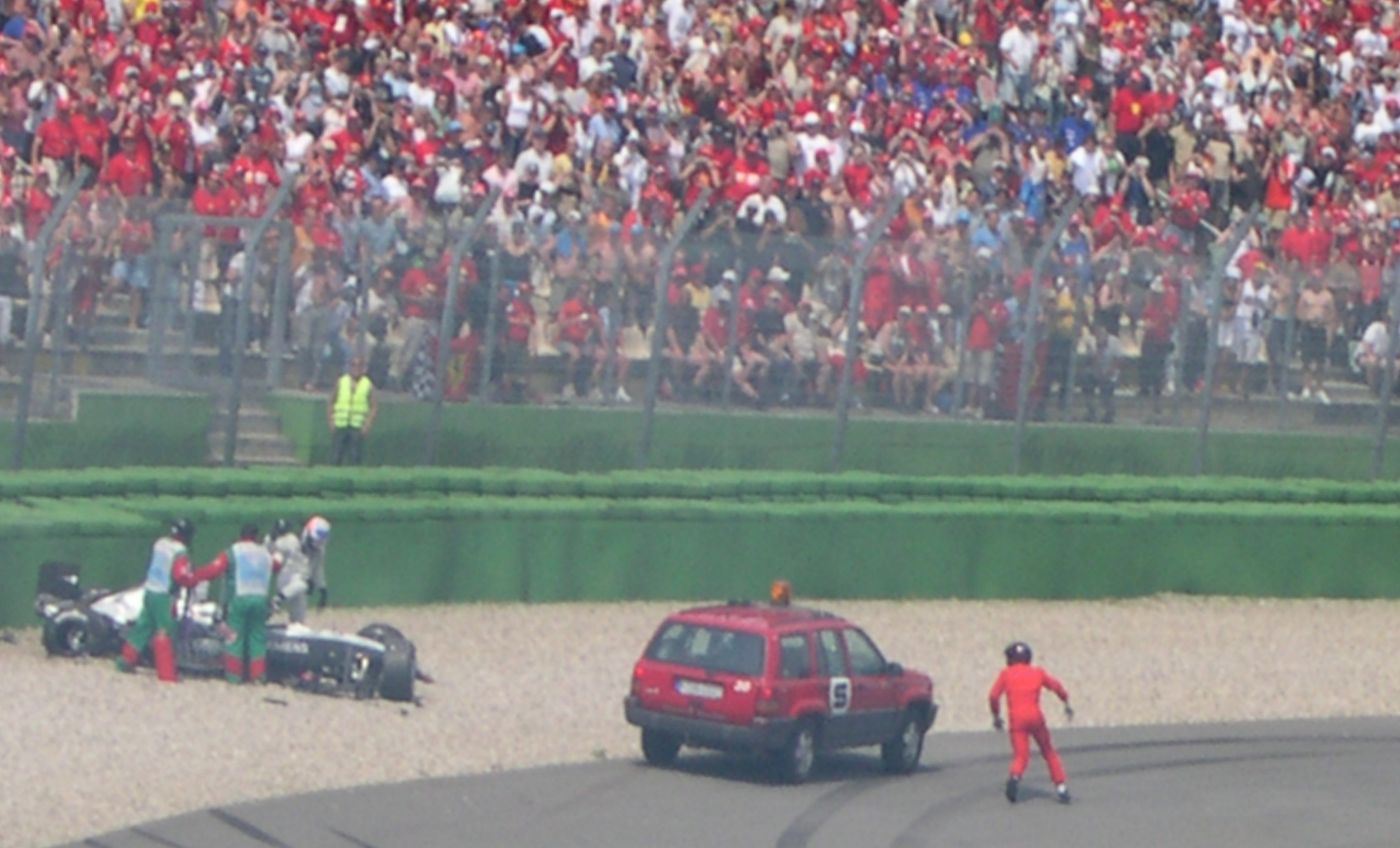
Kimi Räikkönen's accident on lap 13

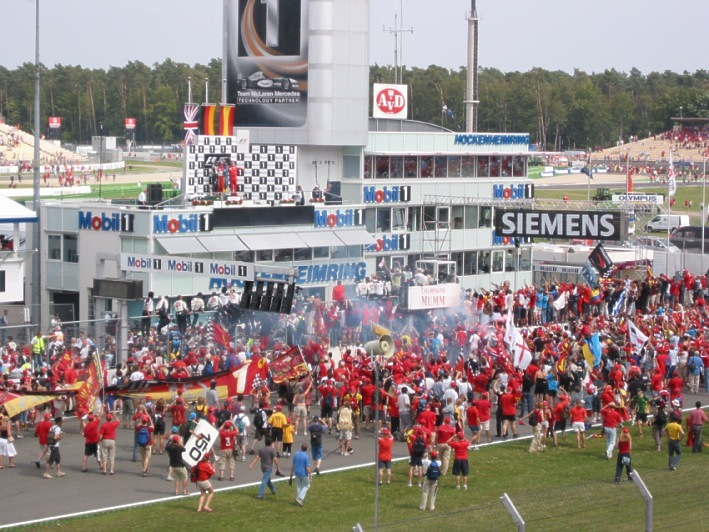
Fans celebrating on track during the podium ceremony

At the start, Michael Schumacher held the lead, but second-starting Juan Pablo Montoya dropped down to eighth place. Meanwhile, Fernando Alonso shot up from fifth to second, which meant Kimi Räikkönen went on where he started, in third position. When the field arrived at the hairpin for the first time, Rubens Barrichello tried to pass David Coulthard for fifth place, but left his braking too late, locked his rear wheels and crashed into the back of the McLaren. The Scot continued without losing time, but the Brazilian lost his front wing and was forced to pit, dropping to the back of the field. Alonso was passed by Räikkönen at the hairpin on lap 2, while Montoya began his recovery by overtaking Mark Webber into the same corner mere moments later.

Schumacher had opened a gap of three seconds to Räikkönen, but the Finn drew closer to the leader during the first round of pit stops. On lap 13, however, the rear wing collapsed on his McLaren as he was about to turn into the high-speed first corner. His car spun and slammed into the tyre barrier, but the driver escaped unhurt. It was Räikkönen seventh retirement of the season and left Schumacher in the lead with more than ten seconds over Alonso.

Montoya had climbed up to fourth position, but his tyres degraded faster than those around him and on lap 21, he went off track and was passed by Jenson Button. The Colombian triggered the second round of pit stops anded rejoined in a distant fifth place. Schumacher and Alonso kept their positions, while Coulthard fell back behind Button and the latter continued his surge during the third round of pit stops by rejoining right behind Alonso and then passing the Renault driver on lap 51. Button was even faster than Schumacher but the championship leader had enough of a lead to cruise to the finish and take another dominant victory.

Antônio Pizzonia finished seventh and scored two points on his first outing for Williams.

=== Race classification ===
Pos	No	Driver	Constructor	Tyre	Laps	Time/Retired	Grid	Points
1	1	(Germany) Michael Schumacher	Ferrari	B	66	1:23:54.848	1	10
2	9	(United Kingdom) Jenson Button	BAR-Honda	M	66	+ 8.388	13	8
3	8	(Spain) Fernando Alonso	Renault	M	66	+ 16.351	5	6
4	5	(United Kingdom) David Coulthard	McLaren-Mercedes	M	66	+ 19.231	4	5
5	3	(Colombia) Juan Pablo Montoya	Williams-BMW	M	66	+ 23.055	2	4
6	14	(Australia) Mark Webber	Jaguar-Cosworth	M	66	+ 41.108	11	3
7	4	(Brazil) Antônio Pizzonia	Williams-BMW	M	66	+ 41.956	10	2
8	10	(Japan) Takuma Sato	BAR-Honda	M	66	+ 46.842	8	1
9	11	(Italy) Giancarlo Fisichella	Sauber-Petronas	B	66	+ 1:07.102	14	
10	15	(Austria) Christian Klien	Jaguar-Cosworth	M	66	+ 1:08.578	12	
11	7	(Italy) Jarno Trulli	Renault	M	66	+ 1:10.258	6	
12	2	(Brazil) Rubens Barrichello	Ferrari	B	66	+ 1:13.252	7	
13	12	(Brazil) Felipe Massa	Sauber-Petronas	B	65	+ 1 Lap	16	
14	17	(France) Olivier Panis	Toyota	M	65	+ 1 Lap	PL^{2}	
15	19	(Italy) Giorgio Pantano	Jordan-Ford	B	63	+ 3 Laps	17	
16	21	(Hungary) Zsolt Baumgartner	Minardi-Cosworth	B	62	+ 4 Laps	20	
17	20	(Italy) Gianmaria Bruni	Minardi-Cosworth	B	62	+ 4 Laps	19	
Ret	18	(Germany) Nick Heidfeld	Jordan-Ford	B	42	Handling	18	
Ret	16	(Brazil) Cristiano da Matta	Toyota	M	38	Puncture	15	
Ret	6	(Finland) Kimi Räikkönen	McLaren-Mercedes	M	13	Rear Wing/Accident	3	

Notes

- ^2 – Olivier Panis started the race from the pitlane.

== Championship standings after the race ==
Drivers' Championship standings

Pos	Driver	Points
1	(Germany) Michael Schumacher	110
2	(Brazil) Rubens Barrichello	74
3	(United Kingdom) Jenson Button	61
4	(Italy) Jarno Trulli	46
5	(Spain) Fernando Alonso	39

Constructors' Championship standings

Pos	Constructor	Points
1	(Italy) Ferrari	184
2	(France) Renault	85
3	(United Kingdom) BAR-Honda	76
4	(United Kingdom) Williams-BMW	47
5	(United Kingdom) McLaren-Mercedes	37

- Note: Only the top five positions are included for both sets of standings.

== See also ==
- 2004 Hockenheimring F3000 round

== Footnotes ==
Previous race: 2004 British Grand Prix	FIA Formula One World Championship; 2004 season	Next race: 2004 Hungarian Grand Prix
Previous race: 2003 German Grand Prix	German Grand Prix	Next race: 2005 German Grand Prix
