= 2001 Italian Grand Prix =

15th round of the 2001 Formula One season

Coordinates: 45°36′56″N 9°16′52″E

Race 15 of 17 in the 2001 Formula One World Championship
← Previous race	Next race →
- Autodromo Nazionale di Monza

Race details
- Date: 16 September 2001
- Official name: Gran Premio Campari d'Italia 2001
- Location: Autodromo Nazionale di Monza, Monza, Lombardy, Italy
- Course: Permanent racing facility
- Course length: 5.793 km (3.600 miles)
- Distance: 53 laps, 306.749 km (190.604 miles)
- Weather: Sunny, partly cloudy, Air: 19 to 20 °C (66 to 68 °F), Track 26 °C (79 °F)
- Attendance: 95,000–110,000

Pole position
Driver	(Colombia) Juan Pablo Montoya	Williams-BMW
- Time: 1:22.216

Fastest lap
Driver	(Germany) Ralf Schumacher	Williams-BMW
- Time: 1:25.073 on lap 39

Podium
First	(Colombia) Juan Pablo Montoya	Williams-BMW
Second	(Brazil) Rubens Barrichello	Ferrari
Third	(Germany) Ralf Schumacher	Williams-BMW

The 2001 Italian Grand Prix (formally the Gran Premio Campari d'Italia 2001) was a Formula One motor race held before around 95,000 to 110,000 spectators on 16 September 2001 at the Autodromo Nazionale di Monza near Monza, Lombardy, Italy. It was the 15th round of the 2001 Formula One World Championship and the 72nd Italian Grand Prix. Rookie Williams driver Juan Pablo Montoya won the 53-lap race from pole position. Rubens Barrichello finished second in a Ferrari with Montoya's teammate Ralf Schumacher third.

Montoya maintained his start-line advantage and led until he exited a chicane slowly due to a tyre blister and was overtaken by Barrichello on the ninth lap. Barrichello pulled away from Montoya and held the lead until his first of two pit stops on lap 19 which proved problematic because of a faulty refuelling rig that had been reprogrammed. Montoya was put a one-stop strategy by his team and made a pit stop on lap 29, which allowed his teammate Ralf Schumacher to lead the race for six laps. Barrichello regained the lead on lap 36, and held it for six more laps until Montoya took over the position on lap 42 when Barrichello made a pit stop for the second time for fuel. Barrichello started to reduce the gap between himself and Montoya but was unable to challenge the Williams driver who achieved his maiden Formula One victory and the first for a Colombian driver.

The result meant Montoya moved into fifth position in the World Drivers' Championship, 83 championship points behind leader Michael Schumacher who clinched the title two races beforehand at the Hungarian Grand Prix. Barrichello's second position finish allowed him to close the gap to David Coulthard in second place in the World Drivers' Championship. Williams' strong finish meant the gap between themselves and McLaren was reduced to eight championship points in the World Constructors' Championship with two races remaining in the season.

== Background ==
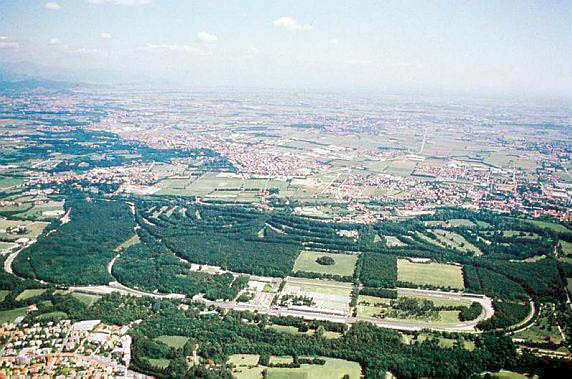
The Autodromo Nazionale di Monza, where the race was held.

The 2001 Italian Grand Prix was the 15th of the 17 round 2001 Formula One World Championship and occurred at the clockwise 5.793 km (3.600 mi) Monza Circuit close to Monza, Lombardy, Italy on 16 September. It was the second race of the season to be held in Italy following the San Marino Grand Prix in April. Before the race, both the World Drivers' Championship and World Constructors' Championship were already settled, with Ferrari driver Michael Schumacher having won the World Drivers' Championship two rounds earlier in the Hungarian Grand Prix and Ferrari took the World Constructors' Championship at the same event, with McLaren too many championship points behind to be able to catch them.

After the Belgian Grand Prix on 2 September, the teams conducted mid-season testing at various European race circuits between 4–7 September to prepare for the Italian Grand Prix at the Autodromo Nazionale di Monza. Ferrari, Williams, British American Racing (BAR), Jordan and Minardi tested at Italy's Mugello Circuit. Rubens Barrichello for Ferrari set the fastest times on the first and second days. The second day of testing was disrupted on six occasions after BAR test driver Takuma Sato went off the circuit, suffered an electronic control unit failure and had a malfunctioning anti-stall system. BAR's Olivier Panis and Minardi driver Alex Yoong both had problems with their clutch and gearboxes. On the final day Michael Schumacher set the fastest lap of 1:24.226, four-tenths ahead of Panis. Ferrari test driver Luca Badoer spent three days at the Italian marque's private test track, the Fiorano Circuit, where he did practice starts as well as testing of launch control and traction control. Arrows did no testing during this period.

After the September 11 attacks on New York and Washington D.C., Formula One's governing body, the Fédération Internationale de l'Automobile (FIA) announced that the Italian Grand Prix would go ahead as scheduled. Ferrari president Luca di Montezemolo said that his team would approach the race as a normal racing event instead of a traditional Ferrari festival. Furthermore, di Montezemolo stated Formula One should continue its normal schedule and not cancel races. Additionally, the Automobile Club d'Italia urged fans and spectators to behave "in keeping with the gravity of the situation and in collective participation in the pain of American citizens." Podium celebrations were also cancelled and all pre-race ceremonies including a flypast by the Italian Tricolour Arrows display team were called off. Three teams altered their car's liveries as a mark of respect. Ferrari stripped their cars of all advertising and painted their nose cones black. Jaguar fitted black engine covers to their R2 cars on Saturday morning, and Jordan sponsor Deutsche Post replaced its branding with the flag of the United States on the Jordan cars engine cover on Sunday morning. Michael Schumacher was reluctant to take part in the race and said in 2002 that he felt it was a "bad sign" to be driving after the 11 September attacks. His brother Ralf Schumacher also felt the event should not have gone ahead.

Williams' Juan Pablo Montoya felt Monza would suit his car's BMW engine, saying: "We should be really quick, but we will have to see what happens. The most important thing, as we have seen in qualifying in Spa, is to get the car right. If we get it right we should be very quick." Michael Schumacher was intent to help his teammate Barrichello finish second in the World Drivers' Championship and revealed that Ferrari technical director Ross Brawn had told him "it doesn't feel much difference this race to the others", adding, "That is because we are still trying to keep winning races and that means the emotions, the pressures and the nervousness is pretty much the same, whether or not we have won the world championship."

There were 11 teams (each representing a different constructor) each fielding two drivers for the Grand Prix with two driver changes. The Minardi team replaced regular driver Tarso Marques with Yoong, who received backing from the Magnum Corporation and was granted a super licence after a two-day test at the Mugello Circuit, becoming Malaysia's first Formula One driver. Marques was kept on as the team's test and reserve driver, and assisted with developing the Minardi PS02. Czech Formula 3000 driver and Prost test driver Tomáš Enge replaced Luciano Burti who had been recovering from a concussion and facial bruising he sustained in an accident at the previous race in Belgium.

Due to the configuration of the Autodromo Nazionale di Monza, with its high average speed, the teams set up their cars to produce the minimum amount of downforce possible. Ferrari installed Carbon Industrie brake discs instead of the normal Brembo brake discs the team had used. Williams introduced a revised FW23 specification for Montoya after one was used by Ralf Schumacher in Belgium. Williams equipped the earlier aerodynamic package on Ralf Schumacher's car on Sunday morning. Benetton brought a new front wing and Ferrari debuted a new engine specification with improved aerodynamics. The Jordan team introduced a new front wing characterised with a single profile instead of the normal two.

== Practice ==
There were four practice sessions preceding Sunday's race, two one-hour sessions on Friday and two 45-minute sessions on Saturday. Team principals agreed in a meeting the day before the first practice session that it would was moved from the usual start time from 11:00 Central European Summer Time (UTC+02:00) to 10:50 to comply with a planned silence for one minute observed at midday throughout Europe and continued the rest of the race weekend as scheduled.

Michael Schumacher paced the first practice session in dry weather conditions, at 1:25.524; David Coulthard and Barrichello were second and third. Nick Heidfeld (who crashed his Sauber car into the wall at Variante Ascari with 15 minutes remaining) was fourth. McLaren's Mika Häkkinen and Benetton's Jenson Button were fifth and sixth. Kimi Räikkönen, seventh, hit a barrier at Variante Goodyear chicane with half an hour remaining, removing his front-right wheel and his front wing after losing control of his Sauber car due to a brake lock-up and avoided Yoong's stationary car entering the Curva Grande corner. Räikkönen was uninjured. Ralf Schumacher, Jordan's Jarno Trulli and Arrows' Pedro de la Rosa were in positions seven through ten. Arrows driver Jos Verstappen set no laps after colliding with the tyre barrier at the Curva di Lesmo on his first quick lap after ten minutes.

In the second practice session, where a brief rain shower fell early on, Ralf Schumacher set the day's fastest time after 13 minutes, a 1:24.667; Montoya had the second fastest time despite going off the circuit and having to go through temporary barriers at the first chicane multiple times during the session. Michael Schumacher, De la Rosa. Barrichello, Häkkinen and Coulthard filled the next four positions. Despite not going onto the circuit, Heidfeld was the eighth fastest driver. The Jordan duo of Jean Alesi and Jordan's Heinz-Harald Frentzen (who hit a kerb in his Prost car and went off the circuit at the Variante della Roggia chicane and slid wide of the track and into the gravel) followed in the top ten. Eddie Irvine spun his Jaguar into the gravel at Ascari corner five minutes into the session due to brake problems and his session concluded prematurely.

Montoya recorded the third session's fastest lap of 1:25.558 with fewer than ten minutes remaining in clear weather conditions but on a damp circuit that was created by a thunderstorm on Friday night which meant the track was slow to dry. Most drivers used intermediate tyres to begin the session before a dry line appeared and dry compound tyres were used. Barrichello was 0.336 seconds slower in second. De la Rosa, BAR drivers Villeneuve and Panis, Räikkönen, Irvine, Verstappen, Enrique Bernoldi for Arrows and Heidfeld rounded out the top ten. Benetton's Giancarlo Fisichella, Yoong, Button, Alesi, Michael Schumacher, Coulthard, Häkkinen and Minardi's Fernando Alonso set no laps during the session.

The circuit continued to dry up until it was completely dry for the final practice session where Michael Schumacher set the weekend's new fastest time at 1:23.178, faster than his 2000 pole lap; Barrichello had the quickest lap when circuit conditions improved but fell to fourth in the final ten minutes. The two Ferrari drivers were separated by Montoya and Trulli. Coulthard, Ralf Schumacher, Heidfeld, Häkkinen, De la Rosa and Räikkönen were in positions five to ten. Enge spun at Ascari turn but regained control of his car and resumed driving.

== Qualifying ==
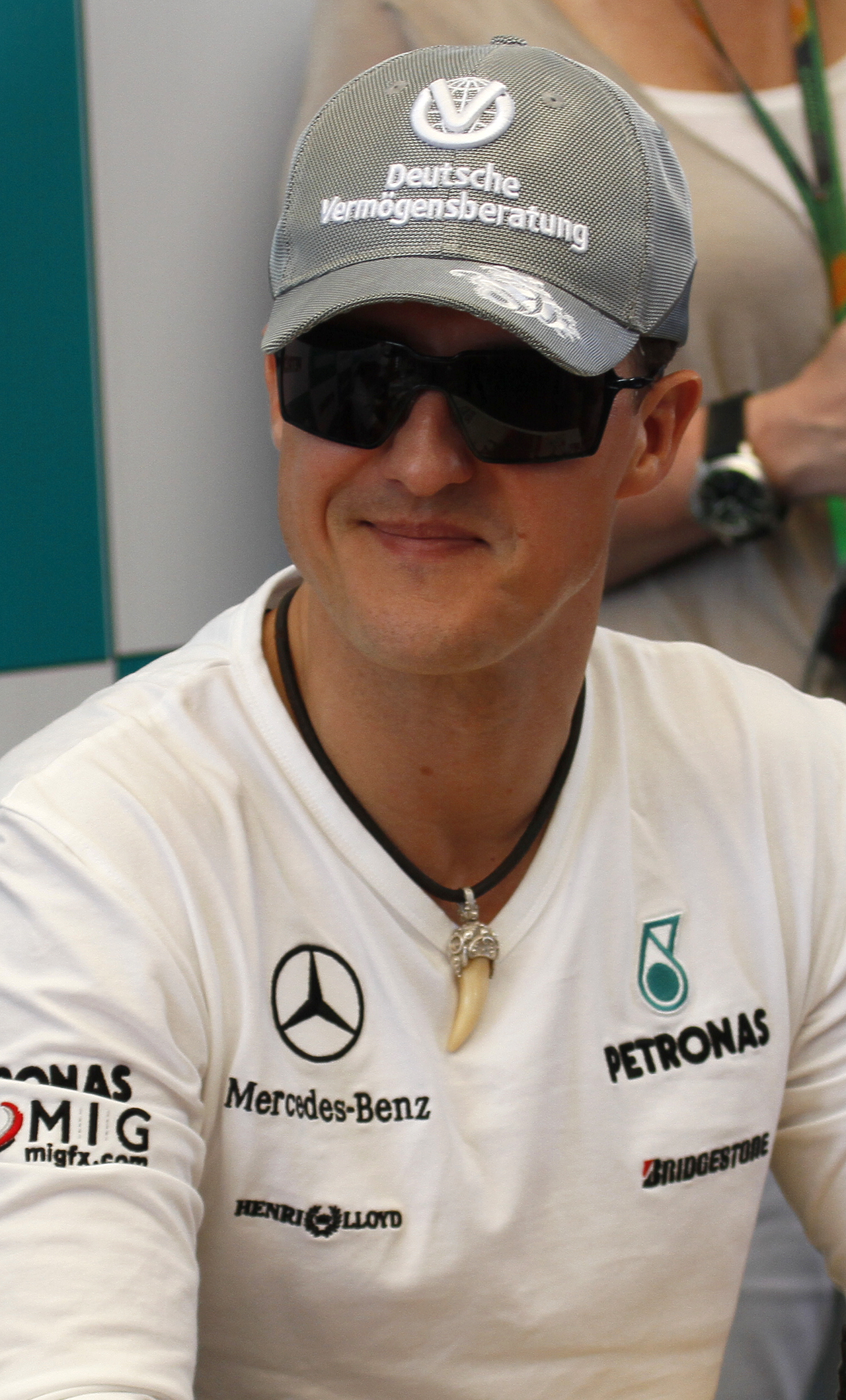
Michael Schumacher (pictured in 2010), the 2001 Drivers' Champion, qualified third.

Saturday afternoon's one hour qualifying session saw each driver was limited to twelve laps, with the starting order decided by the drivers' fastest laps. During this session the 107% rule was in effect, requiring each driver to remain within 107 per cent of the fastest lap time to qualify for the race. The session was held in dry weather conditions, and rises in air and track temperature gave Michelin-shod teams a speed advantage. Montoya clinched his second consecutive pole position and his third of the season with a lap of 1:22.216 set with 13 minutes remaining. Although he was happy with the feel of his car, he did not feel confident of taking pole position. Montoya was joined on the front row by Barrichello who was 0.312 seconds slower and went off into a gravel trap. Michael Schumacher qualified third and made an error on his third run that prevented him from lapping quicker. This was the first race since the 2000 Austrian Grand Prix that Barrichello qualified ahead of Michael Schumacher. Ralf Schumacher in fourth had balance issues which meant his car alternated between understeer and oversteer. He had three clear runs before his fourth was disrupted by a yellow flag. Trulli qualified fifth on the soft Bridgestone tyre compound in a balanced, fast and stable car. Coulthard, sixth, felt his car's balance was good but felt it difficult to push hard and achieve ideal grip. Häkkinen took seventh and ran wide on the kerb at the exit of Curva di Lesmo on his final timed run and heavily damaged his car against the outside barrier with four minutes to go. Häkkinen was unhurt but the crash stopped qualifying for 15 minutes. The two Sauber drivers were eighth and ninth with Heidfeld ahead of Räikkönen on the soft compound Bridgestone tyres; Heidfeld was happy with his position after losing track time on Friday while Räikkönen complained that he had been blocked by Fisichella who was on an out lap.

De la Rosa rounded out the top ten qualifiers and was happy after Jaguar engineer Humphrey Corbett corrected an understeer fault on De la Rosa's car. Button in 11th reported his Benetton was well balanced. Frentzen took 12th and said his qualifying position was more significant than him finishing fourth at the Belgian Grand Prix. Irvine struggled with brake balance which shifted towards the rear of his Jaguar, leaving him 13th. He also was unable to set a faster time after Panis blocked him by driving to the first corner apex and stopped his car. Fisichella, 14th, drove his Benetton team's spare car because his race car developed a hydraulic failure and had an engine issue in the spare car. BAR drivers Jacques Villeneuve and Panis were 15th and 17th; both drivers reported a lack of aerodynamic grip but fine mechanical grip. The two were separated by Alesi in the slower of the two Jordan cars and described his session as "the worst qualifying session I could imagine on a circuit which love" because he had brake balance and handling issues. Verstappen (who adjusted his tyre pressures) and Bernoldi (who had oversteer) were 18th and 19th for the Arrows team as they focused on setting up their cars. Enge took 20th in his first Formula One qualifying session, experiencing two engine problems that Prost traced to a quality control error from engine supplier Ferrari in both the race car and the spare car tuned for Frentzen. The two Minardi drivers qualified at the rear of the field with Alonso ahead of Yoong; both drivers stopped on their out laps at the first chicane with gearbox actuator failures and both drivers returned to the pit lane to share the spare Minardi car.

=== Qualifying classification ===
Pos	No	Driver	Constructor	Time	Gap	Grid
1	6	(Colombia) Juan Pablo Montoya	Williams-BMW	1:22.216	—	1
2	2	(Brazil) Rubens Barrichello	Ferrari	1:22.528	+0.312	2
3	1	(Germany) Michael Schumacher	Ferrari	1:22.624	+0.408	3
4	5	(Germany) Ralf Schumacher	Williams-BMW	1:22.841	+0.625	4
5	11	(Italy) Jarno Trulli	Jordan-Honda	1:23.126	+0.910	5
6	4	(United Kingdom) David Coulthard	McLaren-Mercedes	1:23.148	+0.932	6
7	3	(Finland) Mika Häkkinen	McLaren-Mercedes	1:23.394	+1.178	7
8	16	(Germany) Nick Heidfeld	Sauber-Petronas	1:23.417	+1.201	8
9	17	(Finland) Kimi Räikkönen	Sauber-Petronas	1:23.595	+1.379	9
10	19	(Spain) Pedro de la Rosa	Jaguar-Cosworth	1:23.693	+1.477	10
11	8	(United Kingdom) Jenson Button	Benetton-Renault	1:23.892	+1.676	11
12	22	(Germany) Heinz-Harald Frentzen	Prost-Acer	1:23.943	+1.727	12
13	18	(United Kingdom) Eddie Irvine	Jaguar-Cosworth	1:24.031	+1.815	13
14	7	(Italy) Giancarlo Fisichella	Benetton-Renault	1:24.090	+1.874	14
15	10	(Canada) Jacques Villeneuve	BAR-Honda	1:24.164	+1.948	15
16	12	(France) Jean Alesi	Jordan-Honda	1:24.198	+1.982	16
17	9	(France) Olivier Panis	BAR-Honda	1:24.677	+2.461	17
18	15	(Brazil) Enrique Bernoldi	Arrows-Asiatech	1:25.444	+3.228	18
19	14	(Netherlands) Jos Verstappen	Arrows-Asiatech	1:25.511	+3.295	19
20	23	(Czech Republic) Tomáš Enge	Prost-Acer	1:26.039	+3.823	20
21	21	(Spain) Fernando Alonso	Minardi-European	1:26.218	+4.002	21
22	20	(Malaysia) Alex Yoong	Minardi-European	1:27.463	+5.247	22
107% time: 1:27.971

== Warm-up ==
The drivers participated in a 30-minute warm-up session for teams to adjust their cars and setups and experiment with different levels of fuel before determining their strategies at 09:30 local time. It took place in sunny and windy weather conditions. Michael Schumacher led with a lap of 1:26.029, ahead of Coulthard, Montoya, Barrichello, Räikkönen, Trulli, Alesi, Ralf Schumacher, Häkkinen and Villeneuve. The first nine drivers set a lap within eight-tenths of a second of Michael Schumacher's time, indicating a competitive field. After the end of the warm-up but before the race at 11:15 local time, a second minute of silence was organised by the Italian National Olympic Committee prior to the beginning of the Drivers' Parade.

== Race ==
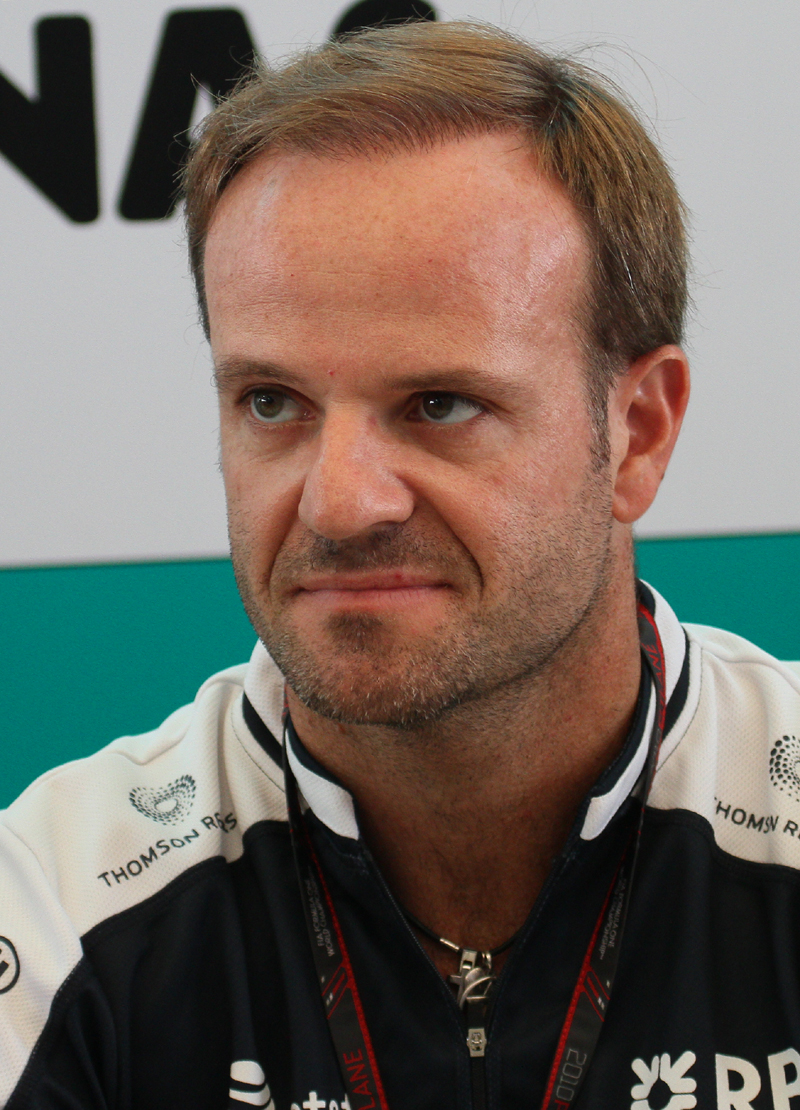
Rubens Barrichello (pictured in 2010) led 15 laps of the race.

The race started before around 95,000 to 110,000 spectators at 14:00 local time, running for 53 laps over a distance of 306.749 km (190.605 mi). It took place in sunny weather conditions; the air temperature was 19 °C (66 °F) and the track temperature 26 °C (79 °F); forecasts predicted no rainfall throughout the race. During the race's buildup on a flat-bed truck at the pre-race drivers' parade and on the starting grid, Michael Schumacher attempted to organise a pact with the drivers that would see no overtaking at the first two chicanes. The plan failed, with Villeneuve, Benetton team principal Flavio Briatore and Arrows owner Tom Walkinshaw refusing to accept the pact; Briatore threatened to sack both of his team's drivers if they complied with the pact. Schumacher had been keen to avoid any accidents at the start, due to a combination of the effects of the 11 September 2001 attacks earlier that week; the death of fire marshal Paolo Gislimberti in a pile-up at the beginning of the previous year's race; a major accident in the previous day's CART race in Germany, in which former Formula One driver Alex Zanardi was critically injured, resulting in the amputation of both legs, and multi-car accidents at the beginning of both the Porsche Supercup and International Formula 3000 support races.

Heidfeld lost hydraulic pressure on the grid; he was required to use the spare Sauber monocoque and start from the pit lane. Fisichella did the same because he had a leaking fuel filler in his car. When the race started, Montoya maintained his pole position advantage going into the first corner, with Barrichello in second. Ralf Schumacher passed Michael Schumacher at the Variante Goodyear chicane but Michael challenged Ralf for third at the exit of Variante della Roggia. He got past on the inside into the Curve di Lesmo after Ralf pushed him onto the grass into the turn. Further back, Trulli was hit by Button, who drove too fast on the slippery outside line going into the chicane, braked too late, and was sent into a spin and became the first retirement of the race. As yellow flags were waved, Button made a pit stop at the end of the lap for a replacement front wing. Irvine moved from 13th to seventh by the end of the first lap, as Häkkinen went through the chicane to avoid making contact with other drivers and fell to thirteenth. Verstappen progressed from nineteenth to eighth. At the end of the first lap, Montoya led by half a second from Barrichello, who in turn was followed by Michael Schumacher, Ralf Schumacher, Coulthard and De la Rosa.

Barrichello and Michael Schumacher started to maintain the gap between themselves and Montoya, and started to pull away from Ralf Schumacher. Bernoldi passed Villeneuve for 11th position on lap two, while Irvine dropped to ninth one lap later after he was overtaken by Verstappen and Räikkönen. He later fell behind Alesi, Bernoldi and Villeneuve on the fourth lap. Button retired from the race when his engine failed and smoke billowed from his car on lap five. Irvine lost a further three positions to Häkkinen, Panis and Frentzen one lap later. Coulthard became the third retirement of the Grand Prix after an engine failure on lap seven, which meant Verstappen inherited fifth and Räikkönen moved into sixth. Montoya had a blister on one of his rear tyres which caused him to slide under braking, and was slow exiting the Variante della Roggia chicane because he out-braked himself into the turn, which allowed Barrichello to take the lead on the entry to the second Lesmo corner on the ninth lap. Barrichello began to pull away from Montoya. Three laps later, Michael Schumacher unsuccessfully attempted to overtake Montoya into the second chicane because Montoya locked his brakes since Montoya overshot his braking point and shortcutted the corner to remain in second. Alesi passed Räikkönen for sixth that same lap while Häkkinen moved into tenth after passing Bernoldi on lap 13.

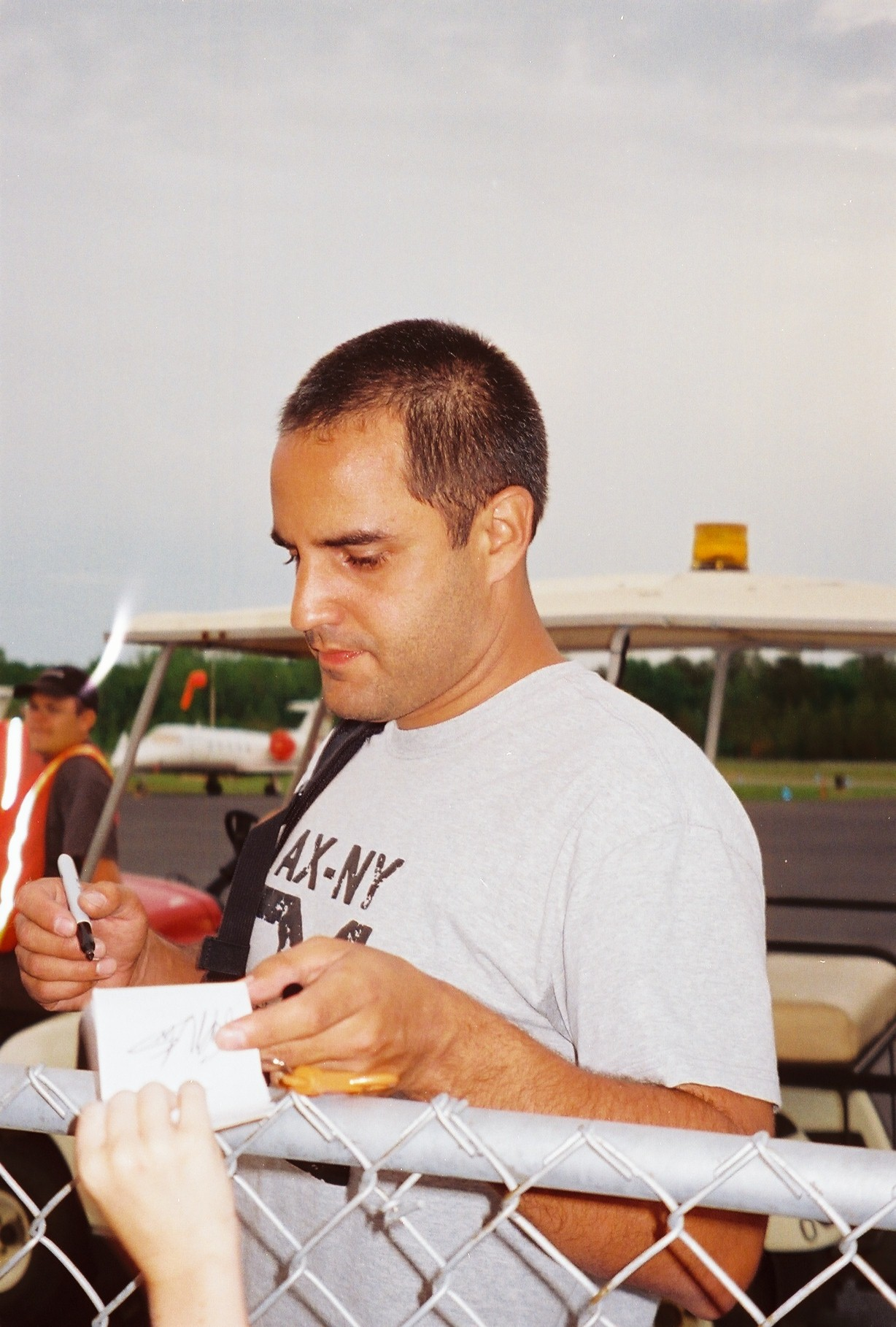
Juan Pablo Montoya (pictured in 2008) won his maiden Grand Prix after starting from pole position.

Irvine retired on lap 14 because he lost horsepower in his car when a cylinder in his engine stopped working. Verstappen fell to seventh after he was passed by Alesi and Räikkönen on lap 16. Yoong, driving with steering affected by Button's front wing hitting his left-front tyre on the first lap, at the back of the field lost control of his car at Curva di Lesmo corner but continued driving; he avoided being hit by Montoya and Michael Schumacher. Michael Schumacher battled for Montoya for third until he became the first of the leading drivers to make a scheduled pit stop on lap 18, and rejoined the track in fourth. The Williams and Ferrari teams were employing different pit stop strategies – the Williams team were planning a one-stop strategy whereas the Ferrari team were planning for two stops because Ferrari were concerned over their brakes overheating. Barrichello (on a lighter fuel load) was able to quickly extend his lead over Montoya to ten seconds by his first pit stop on lap 19. However, Barrichello's pit stop proved problematic: his refuelling rig failed to work after it had been re-programmed and Ferrari mechanics switched to his teammate's refuelling rig, keeping Barrichello stationary for around six to seven seconds longer than planned. Barrichello exited the pit lane in third, ahead of teammate Michael Schumacher.

Häkkinen lost second on lap 19 before retiring at the Rettifilio chicane two laps later after losing all gears. Although he received signals from the pit lane to preserve his brakes, Verstappen retired on the 26th lap with a loss of power. At the front of the field, Ralf Schumacher moved into the race lead when Montoya made his pit stop on lap 28, where his pit crew made an adjustment to his front wing but had excess oversteer at the race's conclusion. Montoya rejoined in third behind Barrichello with a deficit of 5.5 seconds. Frentzen drove onto the grass to retire from ninth with a gearbox failure on lap 30. Villeneuve made a pit stop from sixth on lap 34 and retained the position. Ralf Schumacher set a series of quick laps to open up a gap of 6.1 seconds over Barrichello by his one and only pit stop on lap 35 and rejoined in fourth. De la Rosa was the last one-stop driver to pit on lap 36 from fifth, which he maintained upon rejoining the track. Michael Schumacher made his second pit stop for fuel on lap 40, and dropped to fourth behind Ralf Schumacher. Montoya returned to the lead when Barrichello made a pit stop for fuel on lap 41. Barrichello rejoined in third, right behind Ralf Schumacher.

At the completion of lap 42, with the scheduled pit stops completed, the race order was Montoya, Ralf Schumacher, Barrichello, Michael Schumacher, De la Rosa and Villeneuve. Barrichello lapped faster than Ralf Schumacher and he closed up to the latter. He slipstreamed Schumacher on the start/finish straight into the Retfillo chicane at the beginning of lap 47, and braked later than Schumacher at the end of the straight. Schumacher out-braked himself and drove onto the concrete run-off on the inside of the left-hand part of the Variante Goodyear chicane after attempting to defend his position. He allowed Barrichello past on the inside into the Curva Grande for second because Schumacher was aware that the race stewards would impose a stop-and-go penalty on him for cutting the first chicane. Yoong retired from the event on the following lap after spinning his car into the gravel trap at the first Lesmo corner, and yellow flags were waved. Bernoldi became the race's final retirement when his car developed a crankshaft sensor problem on the same lap.

Barrichello closed the gap between himself and Montoya but was unable to catch up to the Williams driver who crossed the finish line first on lap 53 to clinch his maiden Formula One victory and the first for a Colombian driver. in a time of 1'16:58.393 at an average speed of 239.103 km/h (148.572 mph). Barrichello finished in second position 5.175 seconds behind Montoya and Ralf Schumacher followed in third to complete the podium finishers, ahead of Michael Schumacher in fourth position. De la Rosa was anonymous in achieving his second points result of the season and the first championship points for the Jaguar team since the Canadian Grand Prix with a fifth-place finish and Villeneuve's BAR car completed the points-scorers in sixth. Räikkönen was the final driver on the lead lap in a close seventh position, and Alesi, Panis, Fisichella, Heidfeld, Enge and Alonso were the final classified finishers.

=== After the race ===
Out of respect for those who died in the September 11 attacks, no champagne was sprayed on the podium. In the subsequent press conference, Montoya said he was "so happy" and "pleased" that he achieved his maiden Grand Prix victory. He also said that he was not frustrated on not claiming his first victory in the preceding 14 races as he was not expecting to win during the season. Barrichello said that he felt that Ferrari put on "a good show" despite his slow pit stop from a fuel rig problem on lap 19. He also believed that his two-stop strategy was the right move and described his weekend as "one of my best". When asked if his car was inconsistent during the Grand Prix, Ralf Schumacher said this was not the case and stated although he had problem with his tyres he felt the Williams finish of first and third was "a great achievement".

Alesi attacked Briatore's role in preventing the drivers from abiding by the pact that was to see no overtaking in the first two chicanes and told the Italian and French media that some team principals threatened their drivers if they did not race. Nevertheless, he was relieved that the race passed without any major incident and said the reason why the majority of the drivers supported Michael Schumacher was that he "behaved like a perfect leader". Villeneuve said to British television station ITV that he felt discussing a no overtaking pact at the race circuit was not the appropriate place: "We are race car drivers, Because we signed contracts before the season and everyone was happy to be a race car driver and to earn millions of dollars. Because we knew a year ago that there would be a race at Monza and nobody complained." FIA president Max Mosley stated that he disagreed with the pact and said that the drivers should have raised the concerns in the months leading up to the Grand Prix.

Brawn insisted the reason Ferrari opted for a two-stop strategy was to defeat Williams tactically on the high-speed circuit, adding: "We'd been trounced at Hockenheim, and I didn't really see the point in following a couple of ultra-quick BMWs down the straight." Jean Todt, Ferrari team principal, admitted that the refuelling rig issue at Barrichello's first pit stop possibly lost the driver the opportunity to win the race. De la Rosa said that his fifth-position finish gave his Jaguar team better morale, "The past few races haven't been very good and I am just delighted for everybody in the team. Everything went like clockwork today. The Jaguar R2 felt very well balanced throughout and I didn't suffer from any problems." Button said that he was sorry to have collided with Trulli on the race's opening lap.

The result allowed Michael Schumacher to extend his lead in the World Drivers' Championship to 50 championship points over Coulthard. Barrichello's second-place finish allowed him to narrow the gap to Coulthard to be three championship points behind. Ralf Schumacher remained in fourth position, while Montoya's victory promoted him to fifth. Ferrari remained in the lead of the World Constructors' Championship with an 80-point advantage over McLaren, whose championship points advantage over Williams had reduced to eight championship points. Sauber maintained fourth place, while BAR took over fifth position.

=== Race classification ===
Drivers who scored championship points are denoted in bold.

Pos	No	Driver	Constructor	Tyre	Laps	Time/Retired	Grid	Points
1	6	(Colombia) **Juan Pablo Montoya**	**Williams-BMW**	M	53	1:16:58.493	1	10
2	2	(Brazil) **Rubens Barrichello**	**Ferrari**	B	53	+5.175	2	6
3	5	(Germany) **Ralf Schumacher**	**Williams-BMW**	M	53	+17.335	4	4
4	1	(Germany) **Michael Schumacher**	**Ferrari**	B	53	+24.991	3	3
5	19	(Spain) **Pedro de la Rosa**	**Jaguar-Cosworth**	M	53	+1:14.984	10	2
6	10	(Canada) **Jacques Villeneuve**	**BAR-Honda**	B	53	+1:22.469	15	1
7	17	(Finland) Kimi Räikkönen	Sauber-Petronas	B	53	+1:23.107	9	
8	12	(France) Jean Alesi	Jordan-Honda	B	52	+1 Lap	16	
9	9	(France) Olivier Panis	BAR-Honda	B	52	+1 Lap	17	
10	7	(Italy) Giancarlo Fisichella	Benetton-Renault	M	52	+1 Lap	PL^{1}	
11	16	(Germany) Nick Heidfeld	Sauber-Petronas	B	52	+1 Lap	PL^{1}	
12	23	(Czech Republic) Tomáš Enge	Prost-Acer	M	52	+1 Lap	20	
13	21	(Spain) Fernando Alonso	Minardi-European	M	51	+2 Laps	21	
Ret	15	(Brazil) Enrique Bernoldi	Arrows-Asiatech	B	46	Crankshaft	18	
Ret	20	(Malaysia) Alex Yoong	Minardi-European	M	44	Spun off	22	
Ret	22	(Germany) Heinz-Harald Frentzen	Prost-Acer	M	28	Gearbox	12	
Ret	14	(Netherlands) Jos Verstappen	Arrows-Asiatech	B	25	Fuel pressure	19	
Ret	3	(Finland) Mika Häkkinen	McLaren-Mercedes	B	19	Gearbox	7	
Ret	18	(United Kingdom) Eddie Irvine	Jaguar-Cosworth	M	14	Engine	13	
Ret	4	(United Kingdom) David Coulthard	McLaren-Mercedes	B	6	Engine	6	
Ret	8	(United Kingdom) Jenson Button	Benetton-Renault	M	4	Engine	11	
Ret	11	(Italy) Jarno Trulli	Jordan-Honda	B	0	Collision	5	

Notes

- **^1** – Nick Heidfeld and Giancarlo Fisichella started the race from the pitlane.

== Championship standings after the race ==
Drivers' Championship standings

+/–	Pos	Driver	Points
	1	(Germany) Michael Schumacher*	107
	2	(United Kingdom) David Coulthard	57
	3	(Brazil) Rubens Barrichello	54
	4	(Germany) Ralf Schumacher	48
1	5	(Colombia) Juan Pablo Montoya	25

Constructors' Championship standings

+/–	Pos	Constructor	Points
	1	(Italy) Ferrari*	161
	2	(United Kingdom) McLaren-Mercedes	81
	3	(United Kingdom) Williams-BMW	73
	4	(Switzerland) Sauber-Petronas	20
	5	(United Kingdom) BAR-Honda	17
Sources:

- Note: Only the top five positions are included for both sets of standings.
- Bold text and an asterisk indicates the 2001 World Champions.

Previous race: 2001 Belgian Grand Prix	FIA Formula One World Championship; 2001 season	Next race: 2001 United States Grand Prix
Previous race: 2000 Italian Grand Prix	Italian Grand Prix	Next race: 2002 Italian Grand Prix
