= Formula One drivers from Colombia =

List of Formula One drivers who competed as Colombian

- Drivers: 3
- Grands Prix: 125
- Entries: 125
- Starts: 115
- Best season finish: 3rd (2002, 2003)
- Wins: 7
- Podiums: 30
- Pole positions: 13
- Fastest laps: 12
- Points: 307
- First entry: 1981 Brazilian Grand Prix
- First win: 2001 Italian Grand Prix
- Latest win: 2005 Brazilian Grand Prix
- Latest entry: 2006 United States Grand Prix
- 2026 drivers: None

There have been a total of 3 Formula One drivers from Colombia.

== Former drivers ==
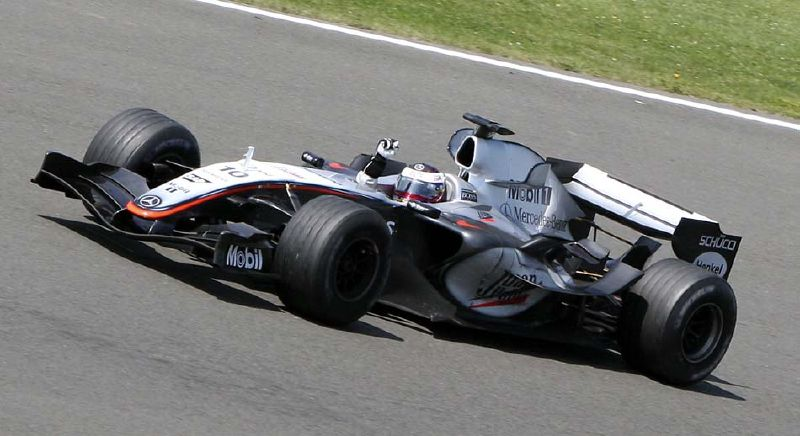
Montoya driving for McLaren at the 2005 British Grand Prix.

Ricardo Londoño is listed as the first Colombian racer in Formula One. He was entered by Ensign for the 1981 Brazilian Grand Prix, however was denied the license that would have enabled him to compete.

A year later, Roberto Guerrero was snapped up by Ensign. He only finished two races out of the 15 he entered that season. For 1983 the team was merged with Theodore Racing, however this did not bring a change in fortunes and he was forced out of the sport when Theodore ran out of money before the final race of the season.

Juan Pablo Montoya is the most successful Colombian driver to race in F1. In a career spanning five and a half seasons he won 7 Grands Prix for Williams and McLaren, including Colombia's maiden victory in the 2001 Italian Grand Prix, finished on the podium 30 times and finished 3rd in the championship twice, in 2002 and 2003. Having won the Indianapolis 500 twice, he is one of two active drivers one race win away from completing the Triple Crown of Motorsport.

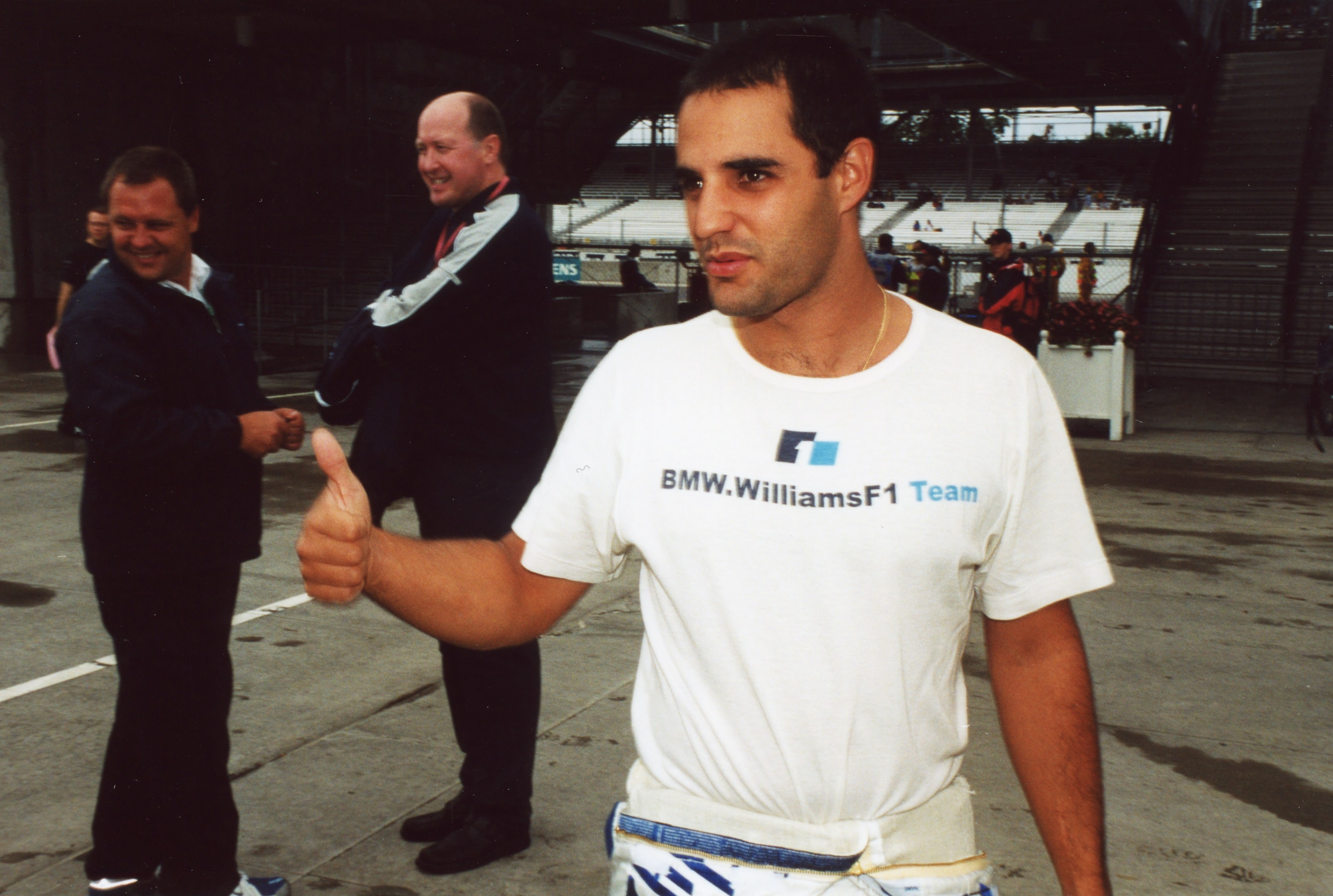
Juan Pablo Montoya

== Timeline ==
Drivers	Active Years	Entries	Wins	Podiums	Career Points	Poles	Fastest Laps
Ricardo Londoño	1981	1 (0 starts)	0	0	0	0	0
Roberto Guerrero	1982–1983	29 (21 starts)	0	0	0	0	0
Juan Pablo Montoya	2001–2006	95 (94 starts)	7	30	307	13	12

== See also ==
- List of Formula One Grand Prix winners
