= Juan Pablo Montoya =

Colombian racing driver (born 1975)

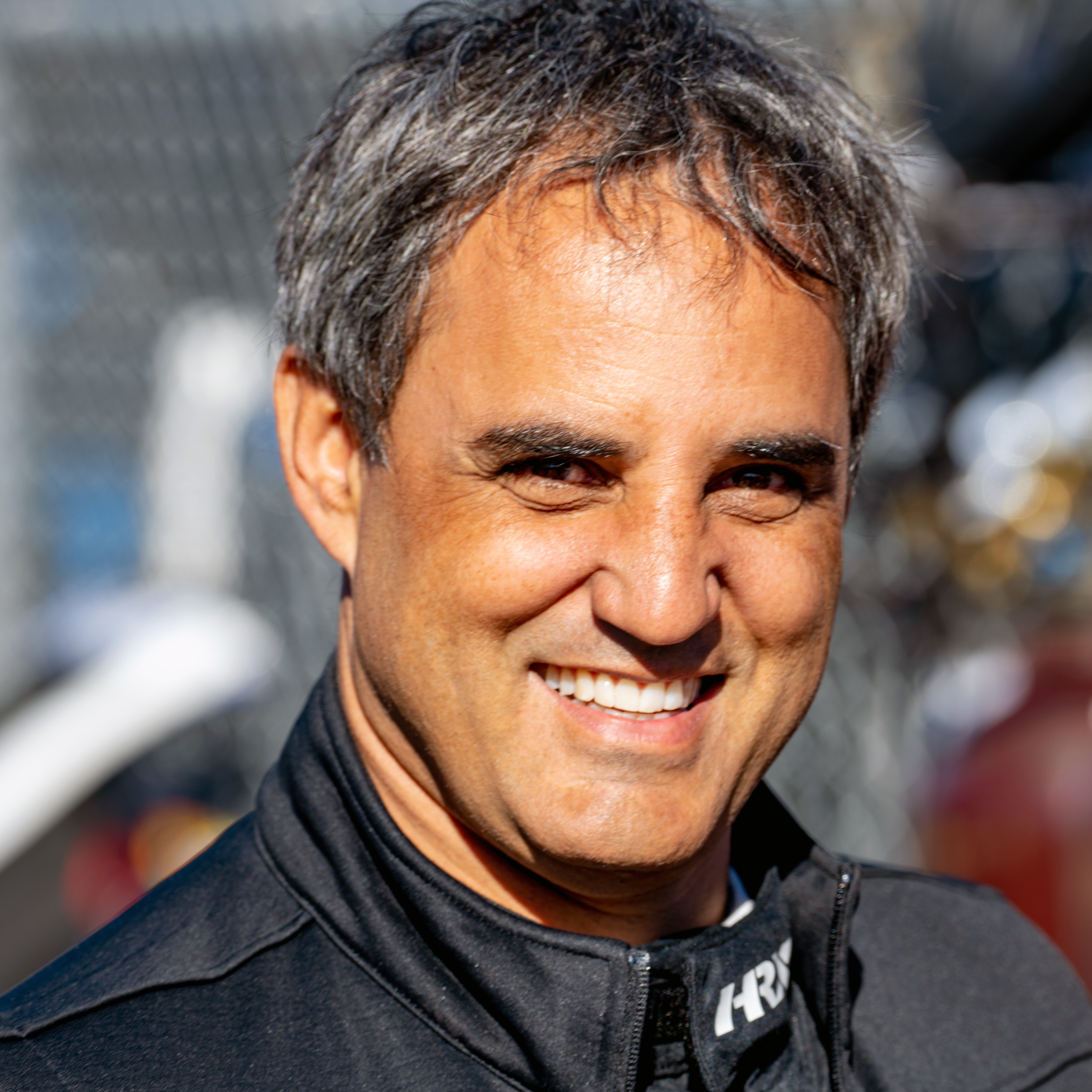
- Montoya in 2025
- Born: Juan Pablo Montoya Roldán; 20 September 1975 (age 51); Bogotá, Colombia
- Spouse: Connie Freydell (m. 2002)
- Children: 3, including Sebastián

Formula One World Championship career
- Nationality: (Colombia) Colombian
- Active years: 2001–2006
- Team(s): Williams, McLaren
- Entries: 95 (94 starts)
- Championships: 0
- Wins: 7
- Podiums: 30
- Career points: 307
- Pole positions: 13
- Fastest laps: 12
- First entry: 2001 Australian Grand Prix
- First win: 2001 Italian Grand Prix
- Last win: 2005 Brazilian Grand Prix
- Last entry: 2006 United States Grand Prix

IndyCar Series career
- 57 races run over 6 years
- Best finish: 2nd (2015) (Note: Montoya and Scott Dixon finished the season with the same number of points scored; Dixon was classified ahead on count-back, by virtue of having more victories.)
- First race: 2000 Indianapolis 500 (Indianapolis)
- Last race: 2022 Indianapolis 500 (Indianapolis)
- First win: 2000 Indianapolis 500 (Indianapolis)
- Last win: 2016 Grand Prix of St. Petersburg (St. Petersburg)
Wins	Podiums	Poles
5	13	3

Champ Car career
- 40 races run over 2 years
- Team: Chip Ganassi Racing
- Best finish: 1st (1999)
- First race: 1999 Grand Prix of Miami (Homestead)
- Last race: 2000 Marlboro 500 (Fontana)
- First win: 1999 Long Beach Grand Prix (Long Beach)
- Last win: 2000 Motorola 300 (Gateway)
Wins	Podiums	Poles
10	13	14

NASCAR Cup Series career
- 256 races run over 10 years
- 2024 position: 43rd
- Best finish: 8th (2009)
- First race: 2006 Ford 400 (Homestead)
- Last race: 2024 Go Bowling at The Glen (Watkins Glen)
- First win: 2007 Toyota/Save Mart 350 (Sonoma)
- Last win: 2010 Heluva Good! Sour Cream Dips at the Glen (Watkins Glen)
Wins	Top tens	Poles
2	59	9

NASCAR O'Reilly Auto Parts Series career
- 23 races run over 3 years
- Best finish: 36th (2007)
- First race: 2006 Sam's Town 250 (Memphis)
- Last race: 2008 Ford 300 (Homestead)
- First win: 2007 Telcel-Motorola 200 (Mexico City)
Wins	Top tens	Poles
1	3	0

24 Hours of Le Mans career
- Years: 2018–2021
- Teams: United Autosports, DragonSpeed
- Best finish: 7th (2018)
- Categorisation: FIA Platinum

Championship titles
- 2019; 2017; 1998: IMSA SportsCar; Race of Champions; International F3000

Awards
- 2014; 2007; 2000; 1999: Indycar Series Most Popular Driver; NASCAR Rookie of the Year; Indy 500 Rookie of the Year; CART Rookie of the Year

Juan Pablo Montoya Roldán (Spanish pronunciation: [ˈxwam ˈpaβlo monˈtoʝa rolˈdan]; born 20 September 1975) is a Colombian former racing driver who competed in Formula One from 2001 to 2006, IndyCar between 1999 and 2022, (Note: The exact years Montoya competed in IndyCar: 1999–2000, 2014–2017, 2021–2022.) and the NASCAR Cup Series between 2006 and 2024. (Note: The exact years Montoya competed in the NASCAR Cup Series: 2006–2014, 2024.) Montoya won seven Formula One Grands Prix across six seasons. In American open-wheel racing, Montoya won the CART Championship Series in 1999 with Chip Ganassi Racing (CGR) and is a two-time winner of the Indianapolis 500. In endurance racing, Montoya won the IMSA SportsCar Championship in 2019 with Team Penske and is a three-time winner of the 24 Hours of Daytona with CGR.

Montoya began kart racing at the age of five, progressing to car racing in Colombia and Mexico at age 17, finishing runner-up in the Copa Formula Renault and winning the Nationale Tournement Swift GTI Championship. He also competed in the Barber Saab Pro Series, the Formula Vauxhall Lotus Championship and the British Formula 3 Championship. In 1997 and 1998, Montoya raced in the International Formula 3000 for RSM Marko and then Super Nova Racing, winning seven races and the 1998 Drivers' Championship. He debuted in CART in 1999 with CGR, winning the series championship as a rookie in 1999. During the 2000 CART season, Montoya's car suffered from unreliability, but he still won three races for ninth in the Drivers' Championship. That year also saw him win the Indianapolis 500 in his first attempt.

Montoya first drove in Formula One with the Williams team in the 2001 season and won his first race in that year's Italian Grand Prix. Montoya qualified on pole position seven times in the 2002 championship and won two races in the 2003 season that put him third in the World Drivers' Championship in both years. He fell to fifth in the 2004 World Drivers' Championship, but won the season-ending Brazilian Grand Prix. At the start of the 2005 season, Montoya moved to McLaren and finished fourth with three victories. Montoya subsequently left F1 in the 2006 season, after that year's United States Grand Prix, and began competing in NASCAR for CGR in late 2006.

During his seven-year NASCAR career, Montoya won the 2007 Telcel-Motorola Mexico 200, the 2007 Toyota/Save Mart 350 and the 2010 Heluva Good! Sour Cream Dips at the Glen. He qualified for the Chase for the Sprint Cup in 2009 and finished a career-high eighth in that season's points standings. Montoya would later make one-off NASCAR appearances: twice in 2014 for Team Penske and once in 2024 for 23XI Racing.

For the 2014 season, Montoya moved to the IndyCar Series with Team Penske, winning once. In 2015. he won two races (including the Indianapolis 500) and finished second in the championship to Scott Dixon. His final series victory came in 2016. He made his IMSA debut for Team Penske at the 2017 Petit Le Mans, competing full-time from 2018 to 2020. Paired with Dane Cameron, Montoya won the IMSA championship in the Prototype class in 2019. Montoya has also won the 6 Hours of Bogotá three times as well as the individual event of the Race of Champions in 2017.

== Early life ==
Montoya was born on 20 September 1975, in a Bogotá hospital, to middle-class parents Pablo (an architect who enjoyed motor racing and amateur go-karting) and his wife Libia Roldán de Montoya (née Roldán). He is the family's eldest child, with two younger brothers and a sister. Montoya's grandfather Santiago worked in real estate, while his uncle Diego raced sports cars.

The family lived in the San José de Bavaria neighbourhood in Bogotá's northern outskirts. Montoya attended the private schools Colegio Gimnasio Bilingue Campestre and later the Colegio San Tarsicio after his test scores were too low. During that time he also became a Boy Scout. He spent four days a week on his education and three days racing.

== Junior racing career ==
At age five, Montoya began kart racing when his father bought him a go-kart, taught him to drive, and trained him at the Kartódromo Cajicá outside of Bogotá. His father mentored Juan, discreetly remortgaging the house without his wife's knowledge to finance his son's career, and obtained sponsorship until Formula 3000 (F3000). Montoya got funding working as a delivery boy for his father, while also learning race craft and mechanical engineering from him, and was inspired by drivers Roberto Guerrero and Ayrton Senna.

He raced in a self-organised karting championship due to the Colombian Karting Federation's financial problems. Montoya won the 1984 Colombian Children's National Karting Championship, was second in the 1985 Colombian National Karting Championship, and won the following year's local and national titles. Montoya won numerous championships in the Kart Komet category's local and national divisions from 1987 to 1989. He raced in the World Karting Junior Championship in 1990 and 1991, respectively. Montoya won four national championships and finished second three times.

Montoya began car racing in 1992, and travelled to the United States that September to attend a three-day Skip Barber Racing School at Sonoma Raceway under the tutelage of lead instructor Vic Elford. Montoya then returned to Colombia to drive a Van Diemen car in the 1600cc Copa Fórmula Renault after series officials rejected him for being inexperienced and for being an aggressive driver until the withdrawal of one driver enabled his entry. He took four wins and five pole positions for second in the eight-race championship. Montoya won the eight-round National Tournament Swift GTI Championship in a Suzuki Swift in 1993, winning seven races and seven poles. He was second in the ten-race Lada Samara Cup with five wins and three pole positions and he won his class in the 1994 Karting SudAm 125 Championship.

After his father determined that his son could better himself outside of Colombia because of the country's lack of race tracks and senior championships, Montoya entered the American-based Barber Saab Pro Series in 1994 featuring normally aspirated cars, winning two races, two poles, and eleven top-ten finishes for third overall with 114 points. He also raced for the Osaka team in Mexico, finishing third overall in the local sports car prototype division, and earning three wins and four pole positions in the Nissan-powered single seater Formula N support category.

Montoya continued racing instead of attending a university after graduating from high school in 1995. (Note: Montoya's mother wanted him to go to university but agreed to a compromise to delay the decision until he turned 25 in case his racing career stalled.) His father was told that Montoya had to move to Europe to further his career, and Montoya's coach, Peter Argetsinger, introduced him to Jackie and Paul Stewart, who tested him at the Silverstone Circuit in England. After Jackie Stewart suggested that Montoya do a year's junior racing, they put him in Paul Stewart Racing's (PWR) Formula Vauxhall Lotus Championship team rather than the British Formula 3 Championship.

He initially struggled, but improved after being taught how to use his energy and to drive smoother by Jackie Stewart. He won three of the season's fourteen races (all from pole position) and five podium finishes for third in the Drivers' Championship with 125 points. In October 1995, he finished ninth in the International Formula 3 Cup at Donington Park, and won the 6 Hours of Bogotá endurance race with co-drivers Jorge Cortés and Diego Guzmán in Spice's No. 45 Group C car.

Montoya advanced to the British Formula 3 Championship in 1996, driving a Fortec Motorsport-entered Dallara F396-Mitsubishi car after South American sponsorship was obtained when driver Cristiano da Matta had funding problems and PWR's plans to run three vehicles fell through due to structural and competitiveness concerns. Despite feeling uncomfortable in the underpowered car and making mistakes, he took two wins, five podium finishes and a pole position to end the 16-race season fifth in the Drivers' Championship with 137 points. That year saw Montoya finish fourth in the Masters of Formula 3 at Circuit Zandvoort. He replaced Jan Magnussen in the International Touring Car Championship's double header round at Silverstone, driving Mercedes-AMG's Mercedes-Benz C-Klasse, and retired from both races. Montoya retired from the Macau Grand Prix, but won his second 6 Hours of Bogotá with Jorge Arango and Cortés.

In 1997, Montoya wanted to move to the International F3000 Championship—Formula One's (F1) feeder series— and accepted an offer from team owner Helmut Marko to drive for his RSM Marko squad in F3000 after budgetary issues stopped Super Nova Racing owner David Sears from signing him. Marko advised Montoya to eat healthily and exercise more in order to boost his performance and be able to handle heavier cars, but he was hesitant and occasionally fell behind due to a lack of mental tenacity. He won three races driving the Lola T96/50-Zytek car at the Pau Grand Prix, the A1-Ring, and the Circuito de Jerez, and took two pole positions. Montoya made errors that cost him two victories, and was mathematically eliminated from championship contention after finishing third in the season's penultimate round at Mugello Circuit, which Ricardo Zonta won. He was second in the Drivers' Championship with 37.5 points and was the series' highest-placed rookie. Outside of F3000, Montoya won the 6 Hours of Bogotá for the third time, alongside Cortés and Guzmán.

In November 1997, Williams Grand Prix Engineering team owner Frank Williams invited Montoya to a shootout between Soheil Ayari, Nicolas Minassian and Max Wilson at the Circuit de Catalunya to decide who would be its F1 test driver. Montoya won the role and covered 5,000 mi (8,000 km) in 1998 as well as studying telemetry for drivers Heinz-Harald Frentzen and Jacques Villeneuve. Montoya joined Super Nova Racing for the 1998 International F3000 Championship after a character clash with Marko and declined Marko's offer to become his manager, who paid Sears for Montoya to race at Super Nova. During a season-long rivalry with West Competition Team driver Nick Heidfeld, he won four races (at Catalunya, Silverstone, Pau and the Autodromo di Pergusa), took nine podium finishes and seven pole positions. Montoya won the championship by finishing third in the season finale at the Nürburgring and ended the 12-race season with 65 points.

== CART and first Indianapolis 500 win ==
Montoya made his Championship Auto Racing Teams (CART) debut in 1999 for Chip Ganassi Racing (CGR) on a three-year contract after Williams signed double CART champion Alex Zanardi from CGR to drive for them instead of Montoya. Williams wanted a more experienced driver and thought Montoya needed more development. Montoya could not drive for the Jordan, Stewart, Minardi and Sauber teams because he was under contract to Williams, but Frank Williams enabled CGR owner Chip Ganassi and team manager Mo Nunn to sign him. Montoya drove the No. 4 Reynard 99I-Honda car, and was advised on oval track racing by Ganassi, Nunn and teammate Jimmy Vasser. Montoya won his first CART race, the Toyota Grand Prix of Long Beach, in the season's third round. He then won the Bosch Spark Plug Grand Prix at Nazareth Speedway from pole position, leading a race-high 210 laps to take the championship lead from Greg Moore, and became the first rookie to win three successive races after leading 93 laps in the Rio 200. Montoya later took two pole positions and a top-three finish at Portland International Raceway due to a penalty and fuel strategy.

Montoya then won the Grand Prix of Cleveland at Burke Lakefront Airport from pole position, but reliability issues and accidents over the next four races lost him the championship lead to Dario Franchitti. He won the next three races at Mid-Ohio, Chicago and Vancouver to retake the championship lead, but two more accidents and Franchitti's better performance over the next three events put him nine points behind going into the season-ending Marlboro 500 at California Speedway. He finished fourth and Franchitti tenth, finishing the season with the same number of points as Franchitti (212) but winning the championship, with seven victories to Franchitti's three. Montoya became CART's youngest champion and the second rookie champion after Nigel Mansell. He was also named the Rookie of the Year.

Montoya switched to an Lola B2K/00-Toyota car for the 2000 season, which was marred by unreliability. Montoya struggled in the first four races, but improved to claim four consecutive pole positions and Toyota's first CART victory in the rain-delayed Miller Lite 225 at the Milwaukee Mile after leading a race-high 179 laps from pole position. He won the Michigan 500 at Michigan International Speedway with a last-lap overtake of Michael Andretti and held him off by 0.040 seconds. Montoya's performance was hampered by mechanical issues in the following five races, despite taking pole position in Chicago. He took his third (and final) victory of the season from pole position in the Motorola 300 at Gateway International Raceway. Montoya finished second in Houston and qualified first at Surfers Paradise in the final three events for ninth overall with 126 points.

Montoya drove CGR's No. 9 G-Force GF05-Oldsmobile Aurora in the Indianapolis 500 (part of the Indy Racing League) in May. Starting second, Montoya led 167 of the race's 200 laps to become the first rookie winner since Graham Hill in 1966.

== Formula One ==
=== 2001–2004 (Williams) ===
Montoya left CGR with Ganassi's approval and debuted in Formula 1 with Williams in its FW23-BMW car in the 2001 season after signing a two-year contract in mid-2000 to replace Jenson Button. He began losing weight to become more race ready and to appease senior Williams officials. He also became acquainted with tracks he had not raced on before by playing simulation video games.

Montoya's car was powerful and capable of challenging for victories, but it was unreliable, and he was frequently involved in accidents; this became less common after the Canadian Grand Prix, when he was involved in a physical altercation with Villeneuve. Frank Williams had a conversation with Montoya, and his performances improved. His Michelin tyres exposed him to understeer due to severe tyre sensitivity, which was rectified. Montoya began lapping his faster teammate Ralf Schumacher, with whom he had a cool relationship. The car was built to his liking, and he began improving on car setup and qualifying.

Montoya led the Brazilian Grand Prix (the season's third round) after passing Ferrari's Michael Schumacher, however, a rear-end collision with Arrows' Jos Verstappen (whom he had just lapped) forced him to retire. Montoya earned his first podium result and the points helped place him second in the Spanish Grand Prix two races later. He repeated the feat four rounds later at the European Grand Prix and added points two races later by finishing fourth in the British Grand Prix. Montoya took his maiden pole position at the German Grand Prix and led until a refueling issue at a pit stop forced him to retire with an engine failure. He earned his second career pole position at the Belgian Grand Prix, although he stalled at the start due to engine trouble. Montoya began the Italian Grand Prix from pole position and led 29 of its 53 laps in his maiden victory and the first for a Colombian in F1. (Ferrari team principal Ross Brawn suggested after the race, that he join Ferrari, but Montoya refused as he did not want to be the second driver to Michael Schumacher.) He finished second in the season-ending Japanese Grand Prix for sixth in the World Drivers' Championship (WDC) with 31 points.

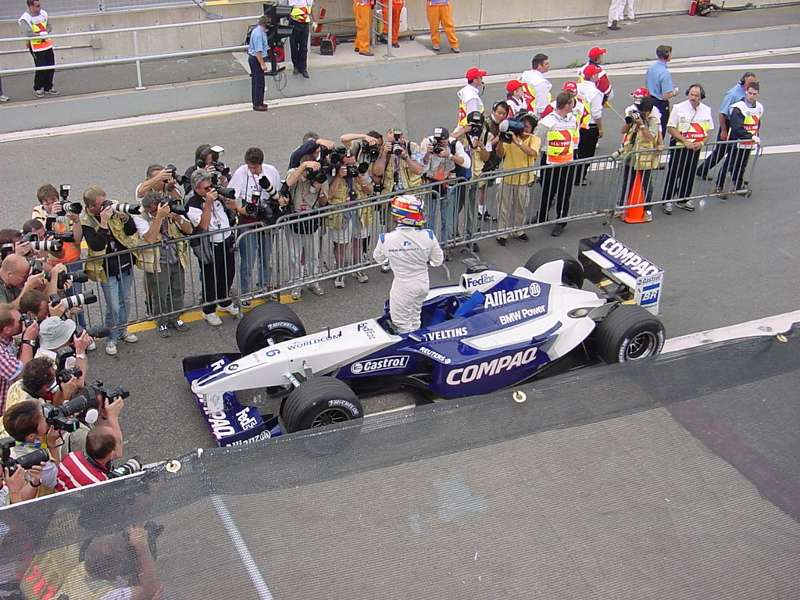
Montoya after qualifying on pole position for the 2002 Canadian Grand Prix

Montoya remained at Williams for the 2002 season. His FW24-BMW car was faster in qualifying, but slower in the race because his Michelin tyres wore out faster than the Bridgestone compounds. Montoya scored points in the first six races, including podiums in Australia, Malaysia, Spain and Austria and qualified on pole position in Brazil, where he collided with Michael Schumacher on the first lap. He took pole position for the next five races, retiring from the first three and scored points in the last two, including a podium finish at the British Grand Prix. Montoya claimed two more podium finishes in Germany, Belgium and took pole position in Italy during the final six rounds. (Note: His pole lap at the Italian Grand Prix was measured at 161.449 mph (259.827 km/h), which was the fastest average qualifying lap. The record is currently held by Lewis Hamilton, who set a qualifying speed of 264.362 km/h (164.267 mph) at the 2020 Italian Grand Prix.) He was third in the WDC with fifty points.

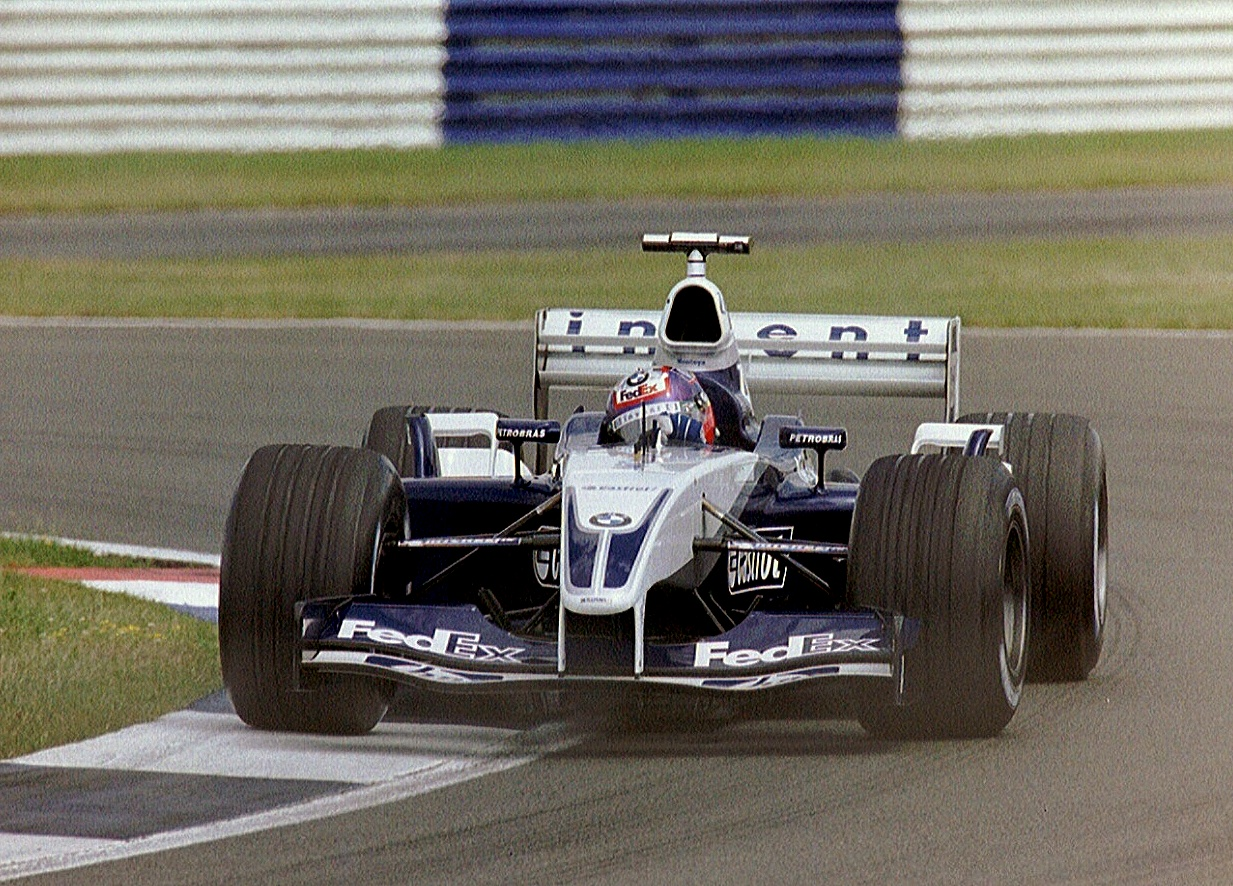
Montoya driving for the Williams team at the 2003 British Grand Prix

Montoya signed a two-year contract extension to stay with Williams through the end of the 2004 season in mid-2002. His FW25-BMW car was enhanced during the 2003 championship, with the logical result of mechanical and aerodynamic changes making it F1's fastest car, particularly when racing in hotter conditions due to the benefit of racing on the Michelin tyres that the team used.

He led the season-opening Australian Grand Prix until a late-race spin caused him to come in second to McLaren's David Coulthard.. Montoya added seven more points in the following five races, finishing seventh in San Marino and fourth in Spain. Engineer Frank Dernie's mid-season improvements made the FW25 car competitive, and Montoya won the Monaco Grand Prix. Montoya would put together a title challenge by finishing on the podium in the next seven races, a run that included winning his second and final race of 2003, the German Grand Prix, by over a minute from pole position, a result which moved him into second position in the WDC. His performance declined after the Fédération Internationale de l'Automobile required Michelin to redesign their tyres after it announced changes to the methodology of measuring tyre width, and he was mathematically eliminated from title contention at the season's penultimate round when a drive-through penalty for a third lap collision with Ferrari's Rubens Barrichello at the United States Grand Prix left him finishing in sixth place. Montoya would end his strongest season in F1, third in the WDC with 82 points, eleven points short of the title.

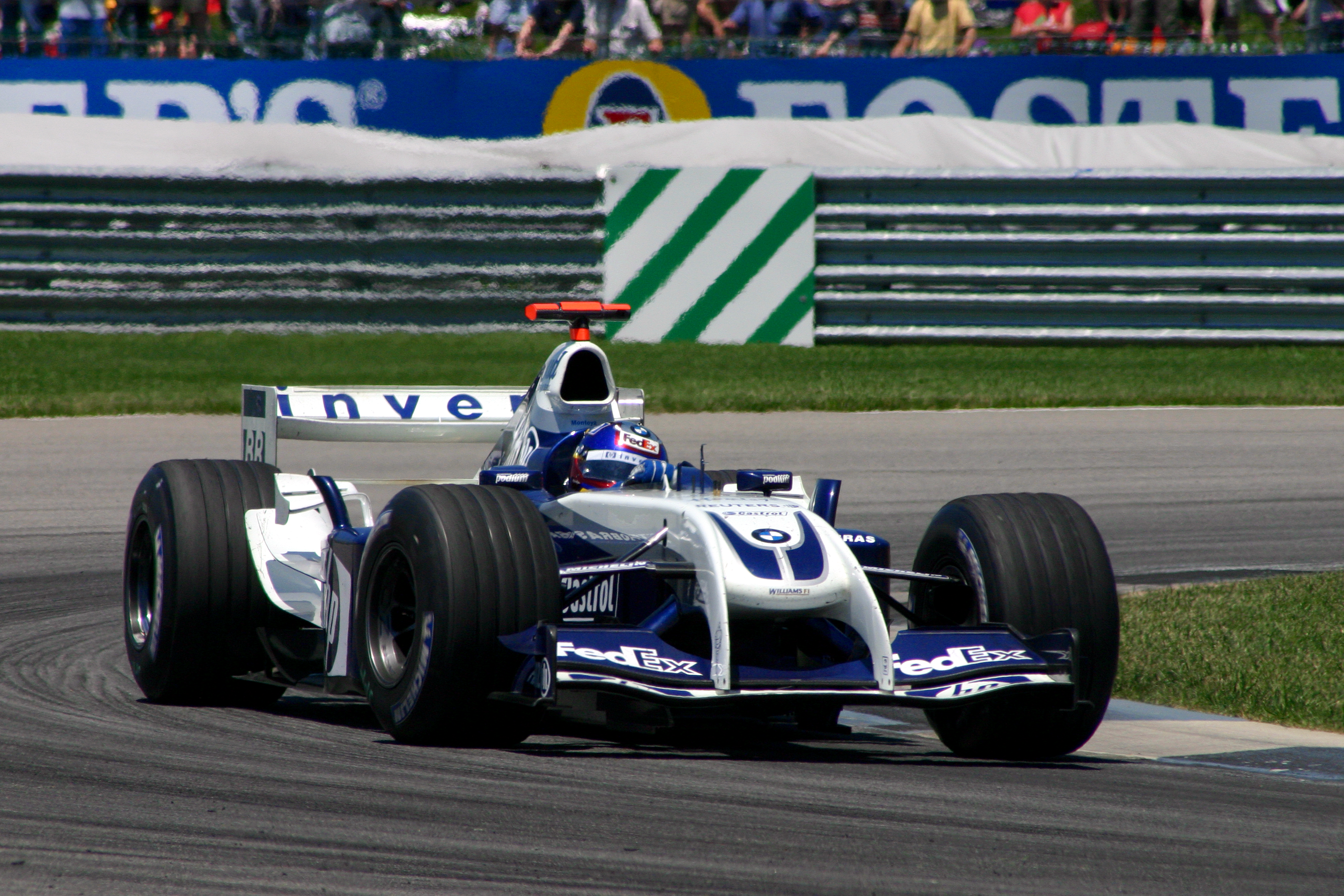
Montoya driving in the 2004 United States Grand Prix

Montoya's FW26-BMW 2004 car was slow and did not have enough downforce to give him confidence driving into corners as Williams switched from a single-keel to a twin-keel chassis design as well as a front wing design dubbed the "Walrus nose" that was dropped for a more conventional design before the Hungarian Grand Prix. He gained points in all but two of the first seven rounds, finishing second in Malaysia and third in San Marino. Montoya was disqualified from fifth in the Canadian Grand Prix because his Williams car had oversized brake ducts and was disqualified from the following United States Grand Prix for changing cars on the starting grid too late in the time available. After that, he scored points in eight of the final nine races, including winning the season-ending Brazilian Grand Prix. Montoya took fifth in the WDC with 58 points.

=== 2005–2006 (McLaren) ===
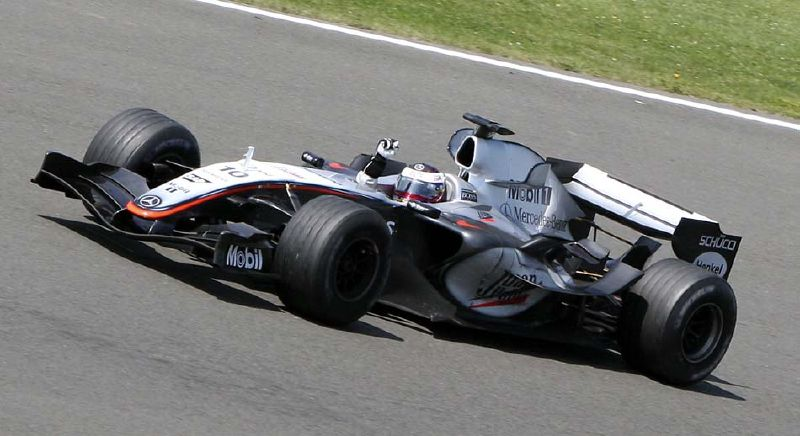
Montoya driving for the McLaren team in the 2005 British Grand Prix

Montoya's relationship with Williams worsened when he was caught verbally abusing their engineers over the radio, believing that pit stop tactics during the 2003 French Grand Prix allowed his teammate Ralf Schumacher to win. Montoya signed a contract with McLaren to replace Coulthard for the 2005 season in August 2003; Frank Williams rejected McLaren team principal Ron Dennis' offer to release Montoya immediately because he did not want to do it a year before his existing contract with Williams expired. He was also upset that Williams might keep Ralf Schumacher, which he believed would stop him from becoming World Champion.

Montoya spent time during the off-season losing weight and raising his fitness levels by switching to a new training regimen and a low-carbohydrate diet to improve his performance after encouragement from Dennis. Kimi Räikkönen was his teammate and had a cordial with him. Montoya's MP4-20 car struggled to quickly generate heat into the tyres, limiting its effectiveness in qualifying early in the season. Subsequent car modifications, such as suspension tweaks, allowed him to be gentle on the tyres and extract extra speed.

After scoring points in the first two races, he missed the Bahrain and San Marino Grands Prix due to a hairline fracture in his left scapula, and was replaced by Pedro de la Rosa and Alexander Wurz, respectively. (Note: A press release by McLaren stated that Montoya sustained the injury playing tennis with his trainer but rumours in the paddock suggested he sustained the injury riding a motorcycle.) Montoya was not fully recovered when he returned, and scored points in three of the next six races before being disqualified from the Canadian Grand Prix for passing a red light at the end of the pit lane. He did, however, win the British Grand Prix and took podium finishes in both the German and Turkish Grand Prix. Montoya won the Italian Grand Prix from pole position, then scored a second consecutive pole in Belgium before winning his third (and final) race of 2005 in Brazil. He could not help McLaren win the World Constructors' Championship as he retired on the first lap of the Japanese Grand Prix after hitting the barrier to avoid an accident and struck a raised drain cover at the Chinese Grand Prix while running fourth. Montoya was fourth in the WDC with 60 points.

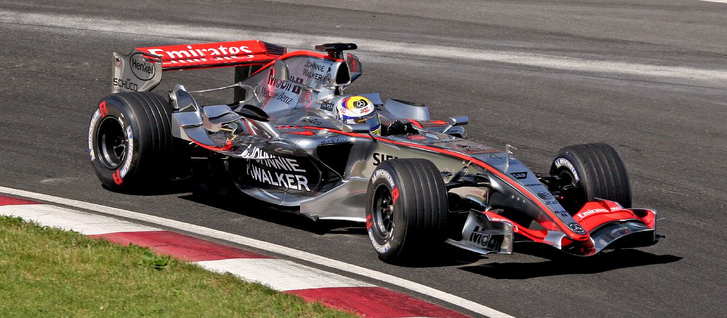
Montoya racing in the 2006 Canadian Grand Prix

Montoya remained at McLaren for the 2006 season, but they did not exercise their option to keep him for the 2007 championship in December 2005 since he had a strained relationship with both Dennis and Martin Whitmarsh. He struggled to drive the MP4-21 car because of its understeer, tyre temperature warming problems, and power loss caused by the switch from V10 to V8 engine regulations.

Montoya was outpaced by Räikkönen, and scored points in five of the first nine races, including a third-place in San Marino and a second-place in Monaco. He was involved in an eight-car accident on the first lap of the United States Grand Prix, colliding with the rear of Räikkönen's car and then going into Button's Honda. Montoya left F1 following the race and was replaced by Pedro de la Rosa for the rest of the season. He was eighth in the WDC with 26 points.

== NASCAR ==
=== 2006–2009 ===
Montoya did not want to race for McLaren and preferred American-based racing; he despised F1's politics, its car, and the team-based focus on victory. He discussed moving to NASCAR with CGR with Felix Sabates in June 2006. Montoya spoke with his father, who persuaded him to switch series, and signed a multi-year contract on 9 July to replace Casey Mears in CGR's No. 42 Dodge Charger at the start of 2007; Ganassi did not want to sign a younger driver.

He informed Dennis of the news and was promptly sidelined from McLaren since he made the statement without informing the team first. Montoya was released from his McLaren contract four weeks early thanks to DaimlerChrysler's intervention and a rumoured $5 million compensation from Ganassi. He rejected an offer to return to F1 with Toro Rosso after telling team principal Franz Tost that he was focused on NASCAR. Montoya began an intensive training regimen to prepare for the following season, and was advised by other NASCAR drivers, including Mark Martin, on how to give drivers space.

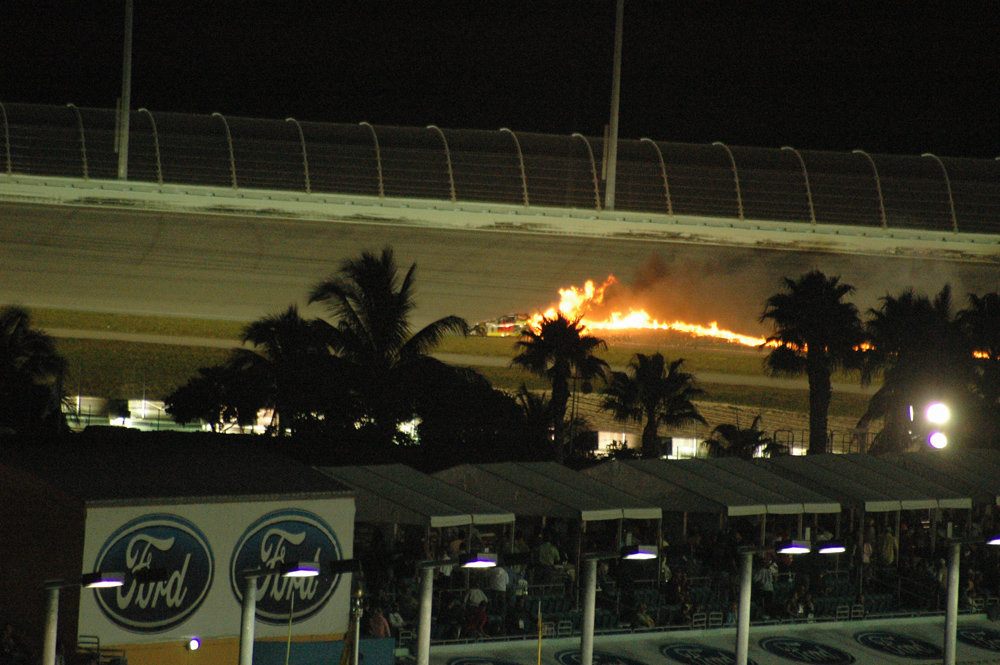
Montoya after being rammed from behind by Ryan Newman in his Nextel Cup Series debut at the season-ending 2006 Ford 400.

Montoya made his stock car debut in the Food World 250 (part of the ARCA Re/Max Series developmental championship) at Talladega Superspeedway as preparation for his first full-time NASCAR season, starting second and finishing third. Montoya entered the following Prairie Meadows 250 at Iowa Speedway, finishing 24th after starting third due to a collision with Steve Wallace.

He made his NASCAR debut in the Sam's Town 250 of the Busch Series at Memphis Motorsports Park, driving CGR's No. 42 Dodge, and competed in the final three 2006 Busch Series races. Montoya had his best Busch Series start and finish of 2006 at Memphis, starting ninth and finishing eleventh. He made his Nextel Cup Series debut in CGR's No. 30 Dodge at Homestead–Miami Speedway in the season-ending Ford 400 because Ganassi did not put him in Mears' No. 42 car to ensure his qualification. Montoya started 29th at Homestead, but his car caught fire after Ryan Newman hit the back of his vehicle, sending him into the barrier.

Constant testing prepared him for his first full-time NASCAR season in 2007, and developed a rapport with his crew chief Donnie Wingo. Montoya frustrated approaching drivers by blocking them when he was one lap down. He was outperformed by both the Hendrick Motorsports and Joe Gibbs Racing teams resource-wise and had difficulty handling the Dodge Avenger model of the Car of Tomorrow that was unbalanced when among packs of cars. Wingo sent Montoya onto a track early in the season in a car with understeer before modifying its setup to boost speed by allowing the rear end to swing out through corners.

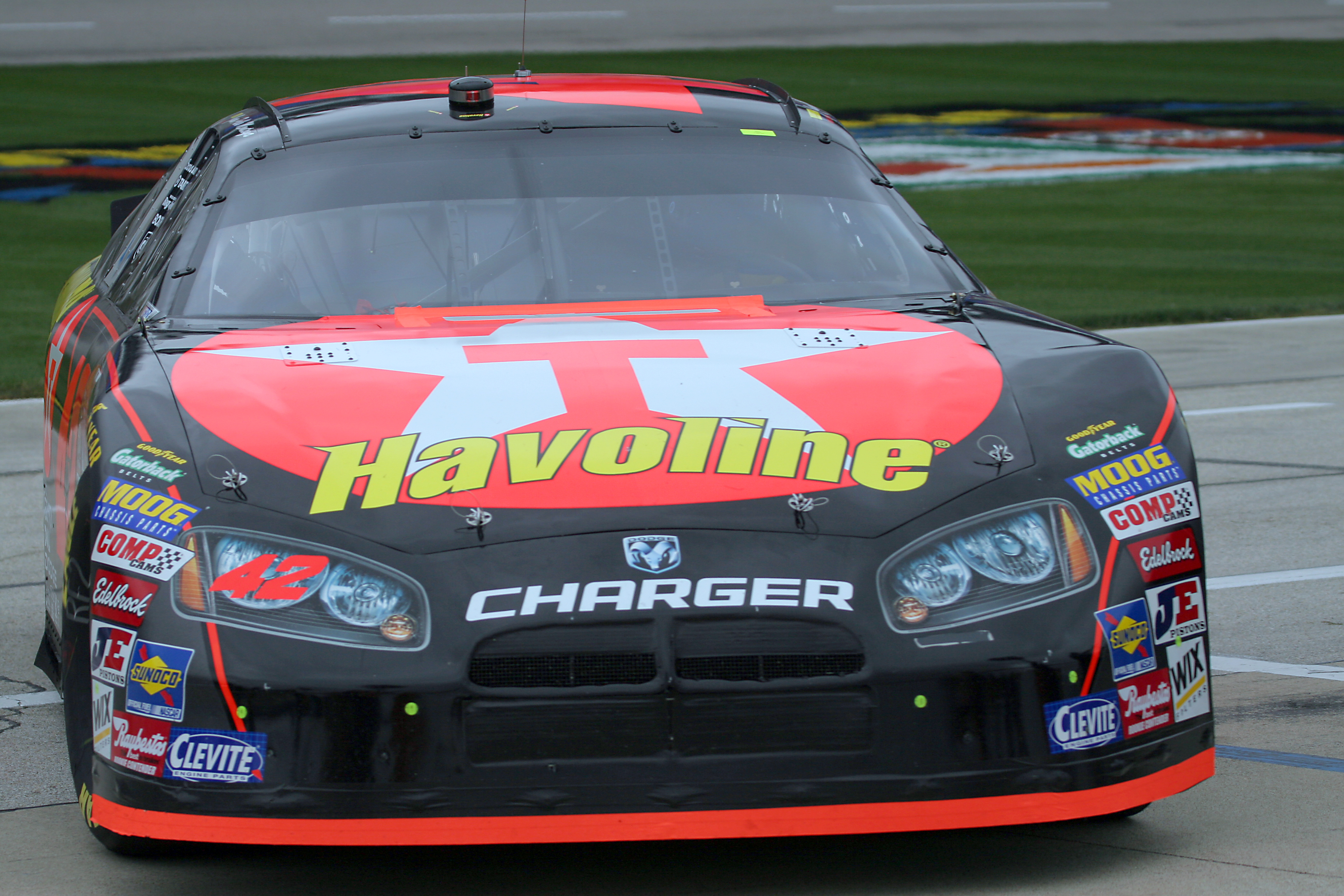
Montoya in practice for the 2007 Samsung 500, where he took his second career top-ten finish

Montoya qualified 36th for the season-opening Daytona 500, finishing nineteenth following handling issues and avoiding a multi-car accident on the final lap. Following three sub-par races, Montoya earned his first career top-five finish in the Kobalt Tools 500 at Atlanta Motor Speedway that March. He finished seventh in the Samsung 500 at Texas Motor Speedway after colliding with Tony Stewart. Montoya started 32nd in the Toyota/Save Mart 350 at Infineon Raceway and led the final seven laps after passing Jamie McMurray for his first career Cup Series victory, becoming the series' first foreign-born winner since Earl Ross in 1974. (Note: He was also the first Hispanic driver to win a Cup Series event.) He started and finished second in the Brickyard 400 at the Indianapolis Motor Speedway four races later. The rest of the season yielded two top-tens at Dover International Speedway and Martinsville Speedway for 20th in the final championship standings with 3,487 points. He won rookie of the year by 24 points over David Ragan.

Montoya drove the No. 42 CGR Dodge in 17 Busch Series races in 2007 to gain experience on tracks where he also competed in the Cup Series. He led a race-high 43 laps in the Telcel-Motorola Mexico 200 at the Autódromo Hermanos Rodríguez before bumping his CGR teammate Scott Pruett with eight laps remaining for his first NASCAR victory and become the first foreign-born NASCAR winner since Ron Fellows in 2001. Montoya finished two more races in the top ten, at Atlanta and Talladega, and his best start of the season was second at Watkins Glen International, where he finished 33rd following a crash. He drove for CGR in the renamed Nationwide Series for two rounds late in the 2008 season, finishing outside the top ten in both races.

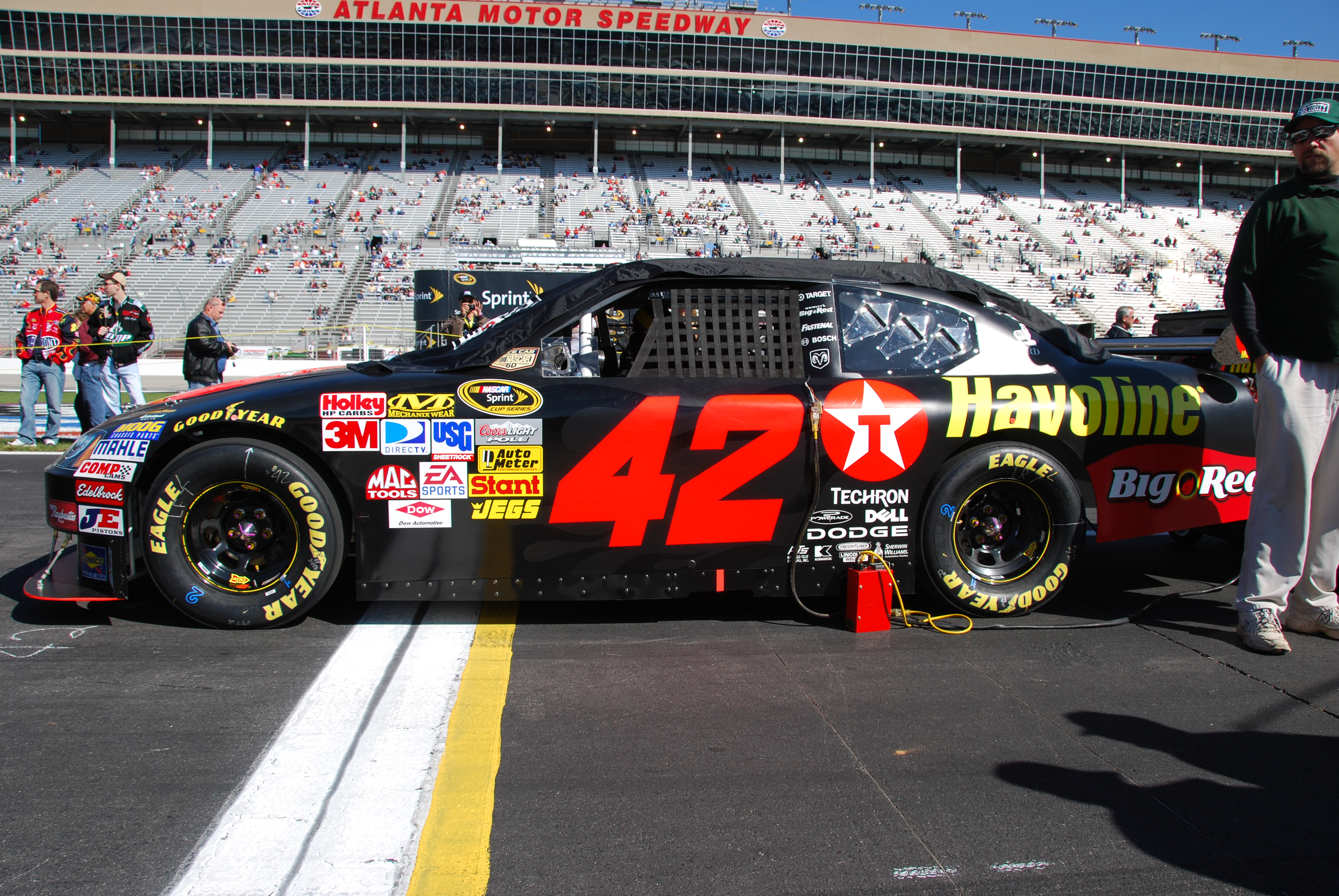
Montoya's No. 42 Dodge Charger before the 2008 Pep Boys Auto 500

Montoya returned to drive CGR's No. 42 car for the 2008 NASCAR Sprint Cup Series. Montoya was 32nd in the Daytona 500 despite running as high as second late in the race. CGR's decline in performance meant he had no top ten finishes or qualifications within the top ten, leading to criticism from Ganassi. Jimmy Elledge became Montoya's crew chief after Wingo was moved to teammate Reed Sorenson's squad before being replaced by Brian Pattie. This irritated Montoya, who openly questioned CGR's commitment, and he requested a face-to-face meeting with Ganassi in May 2008, during which his feelings were soothed. They promised to work together regularly to make Montoya more competitive. His best season result was a second-place finish in the Aaron's 499 at Talladega.

Although Montoya continued to struggle performance-wise attributed in part to the closure of teammate Franchitti's squad due to sponsorship issues, he finished in the top-ten at both road course races (sixth and fourth in the Toyota/Save Mart 350 at Infineon and the Centurion Boats at the Glen at Watkins Glen, respectively). He took pole position for the Camping World RV 400 at Kansas Speedway, but his lap was disallowed due to excessive gas pressure in his rear shock absorbers. Montoya was 25th in the final championship standings, with 3,329 points.

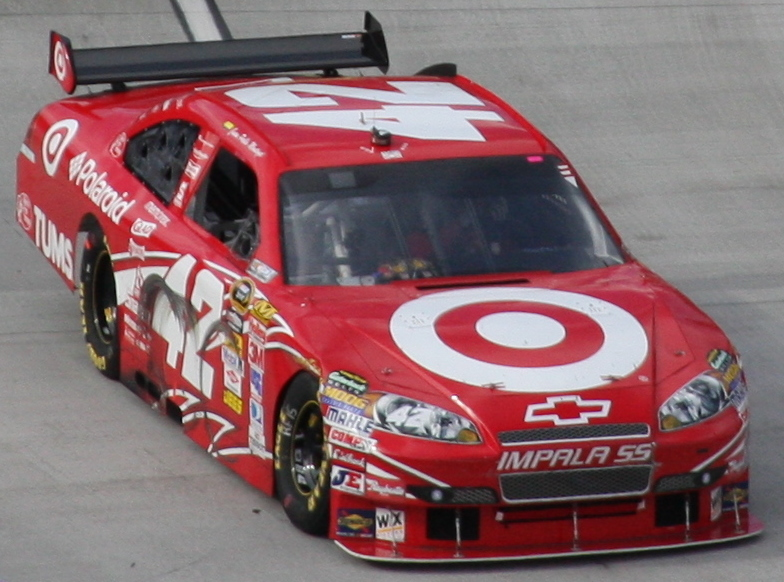
Montoya driving in the 2009 TUMS Fast Relief 500

Due to the Great Recession, CGR merged with Dale Earnhardt, Inc. (DEI) before the 2009 season to form Earnhardt Ganassi Racing (EGR), and Montoya began driving a Chevrolet Impala run by DEI. He rejected offers from other NASCAR teams, and a contract from Tost to return to F1 with Toro Rosso since his family felt comfortable in the United States. During the season, Montoya won no races, but was more competitive and consistent with ten top-ten finishes, improved his qualifying performances in the first 26 races, and drove better on most types of tracks (including oval tracks) by racing conservatively. Pattie convincing him to replace aggressive race setups and on-track risks with long-term thinking and intelligent driving. He benefited greatly by Pattie's calm demeanor.

Montoya had been acquainted with the Car of Tomorrow by mid-2009, when he adjusted his driving style to slow down in order to be faster. In the Aaron's 499 at Talladega, he qualified on pole for the first time in his Cup Series career before finishing second in the Sunoco Red Cross Pennsylvania 500 at Pocono Raceway. He was tenth in points after the second race at Richmond Raceway and qualified for the Chase for the Sprint Cup. (Note: Pattie calculated that Montoya would have to qualify for the Chase for the Sprint Cup by finishing on average fourteenth place each week.) A pole position in the Sylvania 300 at New Hampshire Motor Speedway, along with six top-ten finishes, put him as high as third place in the standings, but he was eliminated from title contention after a series of accidents. He was eighth overall with 6,252 points.

=== 2010–2014 ===
Montoya returned to race with EGR for the 2010 season, but a new car spoiler slowed him. He qualified better and increased his average finishing position over the first 21 races of the season, with eight top-ten finishes, two pole positions, and the took the lead of races more frequently due to his faster pace. Montoya missed out on the Sprint Cup Chase due to a series of accidents, a lack of consistency, and a poor team strategy. Montoya qualified on pole for both the Lenox Industrial Tools 301 in New Hampshire and the Brickyard 400 at Indianapolis, but crashed in both races. Montoya started third in the Heluva Good! Sour Cream Dips at the Glen at Watkins Glen and led 74 of the race's ninety laps to take his second (and final) Cup Series victory. The rest of the season saw him claim five more top-ten finishes and pole position for the AMP Energy Juice 500 at Talladega. He was 17th in the final standings with 4,118 points.

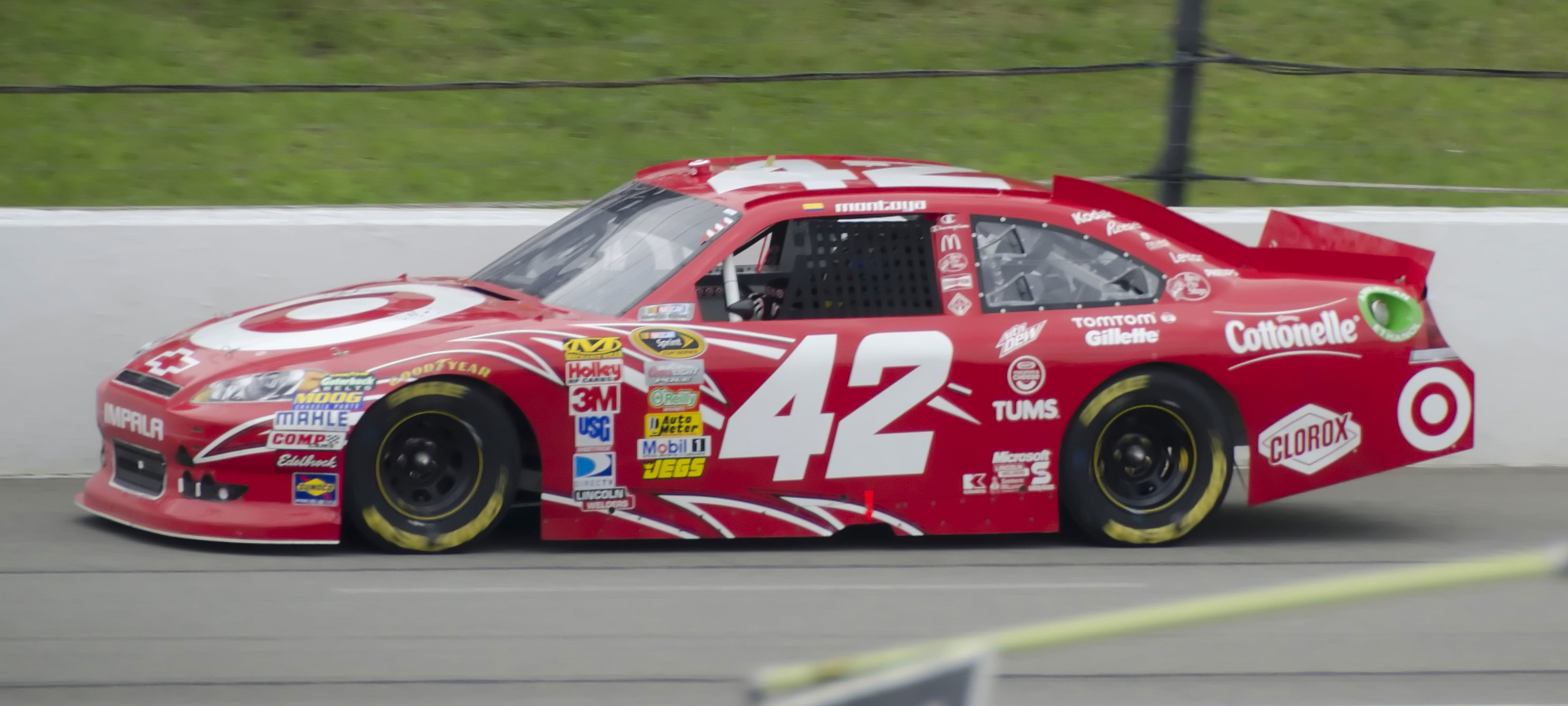
Montoya racing in the 2011 Good Sam RV Insurance 500

Montoya returned to the Sprint Cup Series for a fifth full-time season with EGR in the 2011 championship, but his performance suffered as a result of NASCAR mandating a nose change. He started thirteenth in the Daytona 500 and led for five laps before finishing sixth. Montoya finished third in the Kobalt Tools 400 at Las Vegas Motor Speedway two races later, his best finish of the season. Montoya qualified on pole position for the Auto Club 400 at Auto Club Speedway and in the Crown Royal Presents the Matthew and Daniel Hansen 400 at Richmond in his first short oval track pole.

Following Montoya's inconsistency in the first half of the season, which saw him drop down the points standings throughout the year, Ganassi replaced Pattie as the driver's crew chief by Jim Pohlman without Montoya's substantial participation before the Brickyard 400 that July. He ended the 36-race season 21st overall with 932 points after eight top-ten finishes and no race wins.

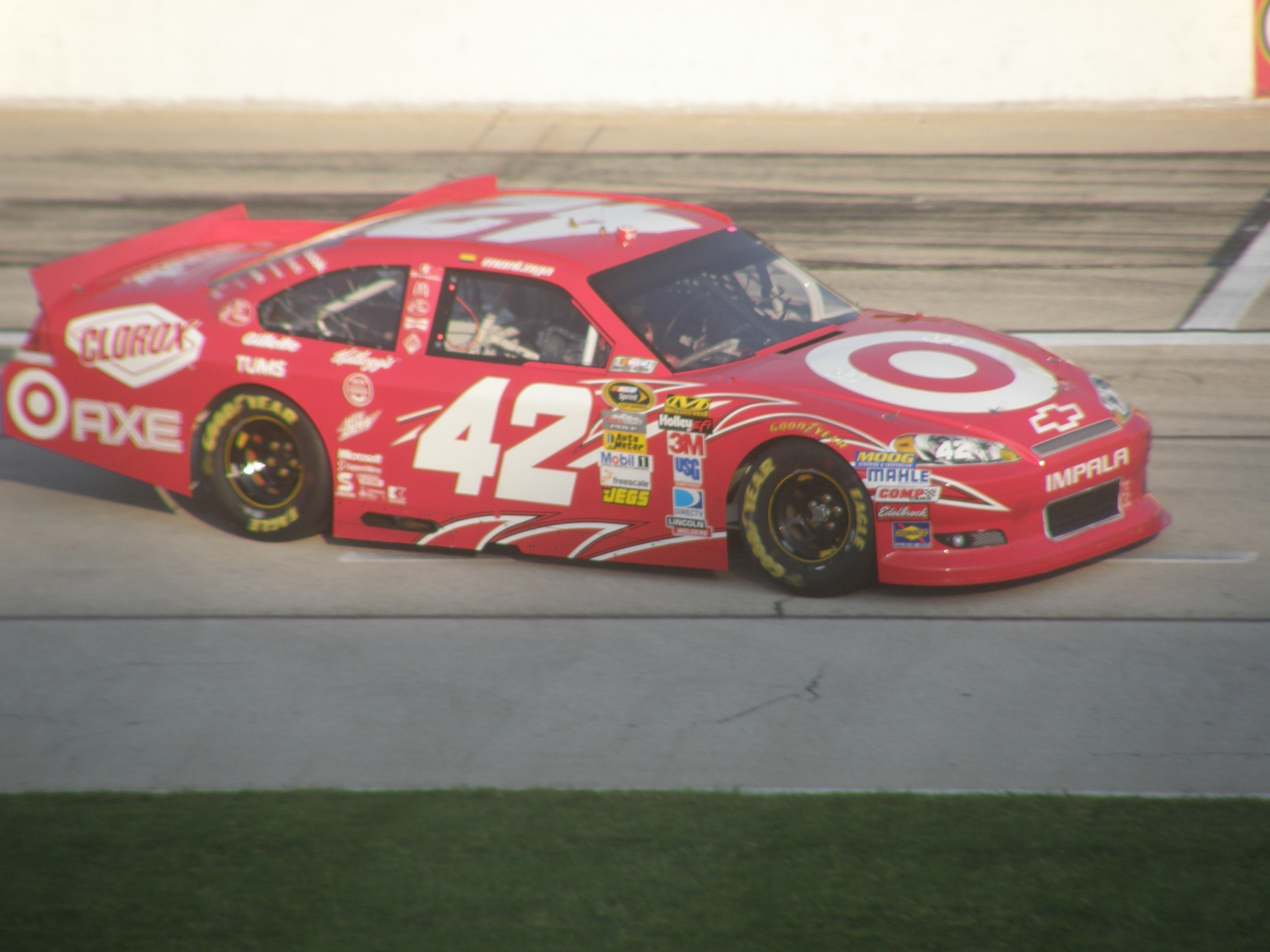
Montoya driving in the 2012 Samsung Mobile 500

Montoya approached EGR regarding a long-term contract renewal in early 2011, expressing his desire to remain with the team, particularly Ganassi. He remained with EGR for the 2012 season and was assigned Chris Heroy as his new crew chief after Ganassi restructured his team. Montoya's trailing arm snapped during the season-opening Daytona 500, causing him to crash sideways into the rear of a jet dryer transporting jet fuel and catching fire. During the season, he only had two top-ten finishes, which were eighth-place finishes at Bristol Motor Speedway and Michigan. Montoya had his best start of the season with pole position in both the Pennsylvania 400 at Pocono and in the Finger Lakes 355 at The Glen at Watkins Glen. He was 22nd in the drivers' standings with a total of 810 points.

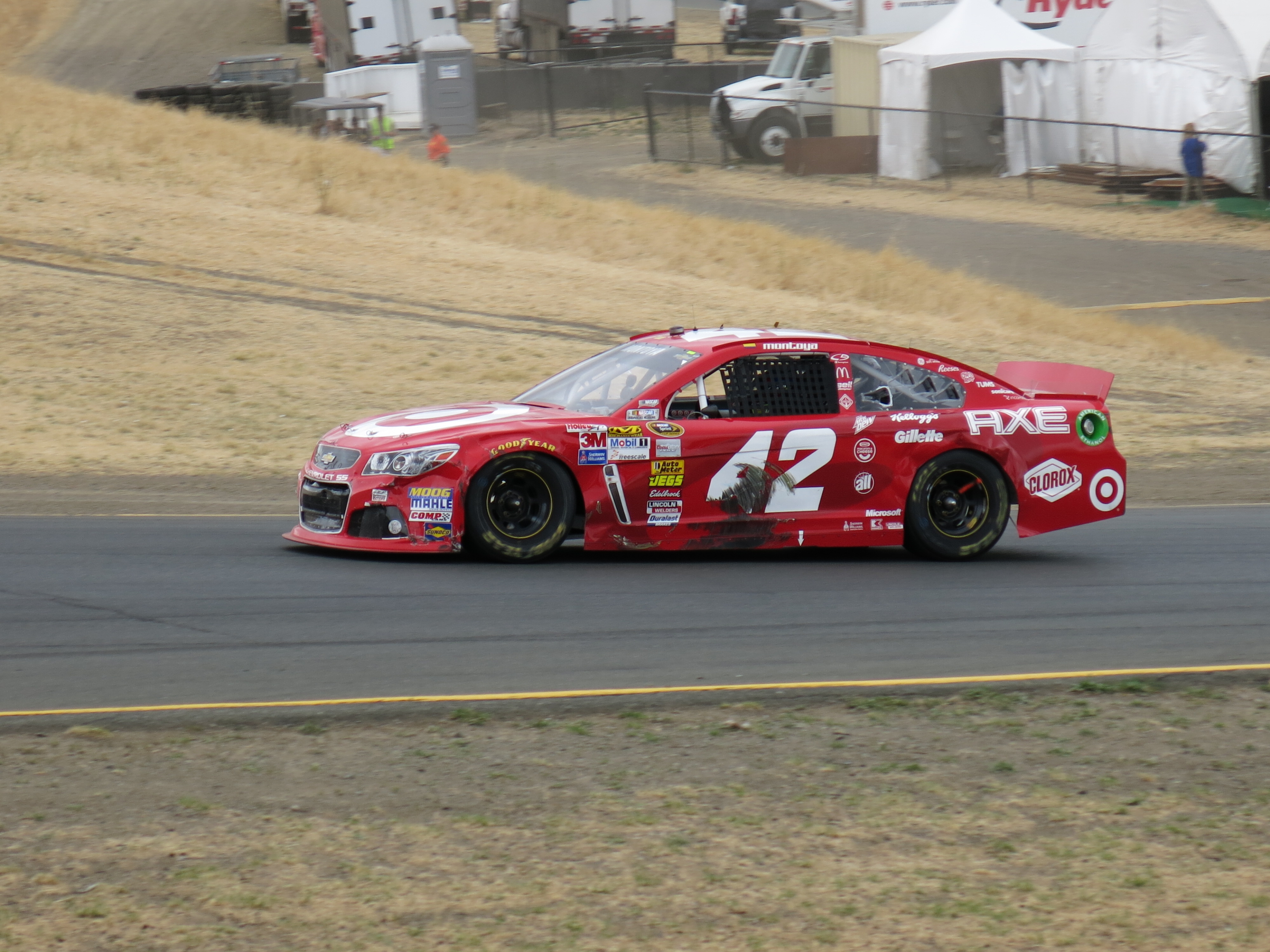
Montoya racing in the 2013 Toyota/Save Mart 350

Montoya remained with EGR for the 2013 season, driving the Generation 6 Chevrolet SS and switching engine manufacturers from Richard Childress Racing to Hendrick Motorsports. He was slowed by mechanical problems and was involved in crashes in five of the first seven races of the season. Montoya started sixth and finished fourth in the Toyota Owners 400 at Richmond after leading 67 laps due to a late race caution.

Four races later, he took his best result of the season with a second-place finish in the FedEx 400 at Dover after leading 19 laps and being overtaken by Stewart with three laps to go. Montoya was set to finish second in the Toyota/Save Mart 350 at Sonoma but he ran out of fuel on the final lap and finished 34th. The rest of the season saw him secure five more top-ten finishes, with a best performance of third at Bristol. Montoya finished his final full-time Sprint Cup Series season 21st in the points standings, with 891.

Midway through the 2014 Sprint Cup Series, he drove Team Penske's third No. 12 Ford Fusion in two races (the Quicken Loans 400 in Michigan and the Brickyard 400 in Indianapolis). Montoya finished outside of the top-ten positions in both races.

=== 2024 ===
Although he had stepped away from full-time racing and concentrated on podcasting and mentoring his son Sebastián in his racing career, Montoya returned to NASCAR after a ten-year absence to compete on a one-off basis at the 2024 Go Bowling at The Glen driving 23XI Racing's No. 50 Toyota Camry XSE after accepting an offer from team president Steve Lauletta. He qualified 34th for the race and finished in 32nd.

== IndyCar Series ==
=== 2014–2016 ===
Montoya was told in August 2013 that EGR would not renew his contract for the 2014 NASCAR Sprint Cup Series, and talked to Andretti Autosport about driving for them in the IndyCar Series as well as Furniture Row Racing in lieu of Kurt Busch in NASCAR, but he declined both offers. Montoya joined Penske in the 2014 IndyCar Series after meeting president Tim Cindric at Michigan that year. He shed 20 kg (44 lb) since the previous summer, modified his workout program to increase his fitness in order to cope with the demands of open-wheel car racing, and Team Penske acquired sponsorship financing to run his car in eight of the planned races.

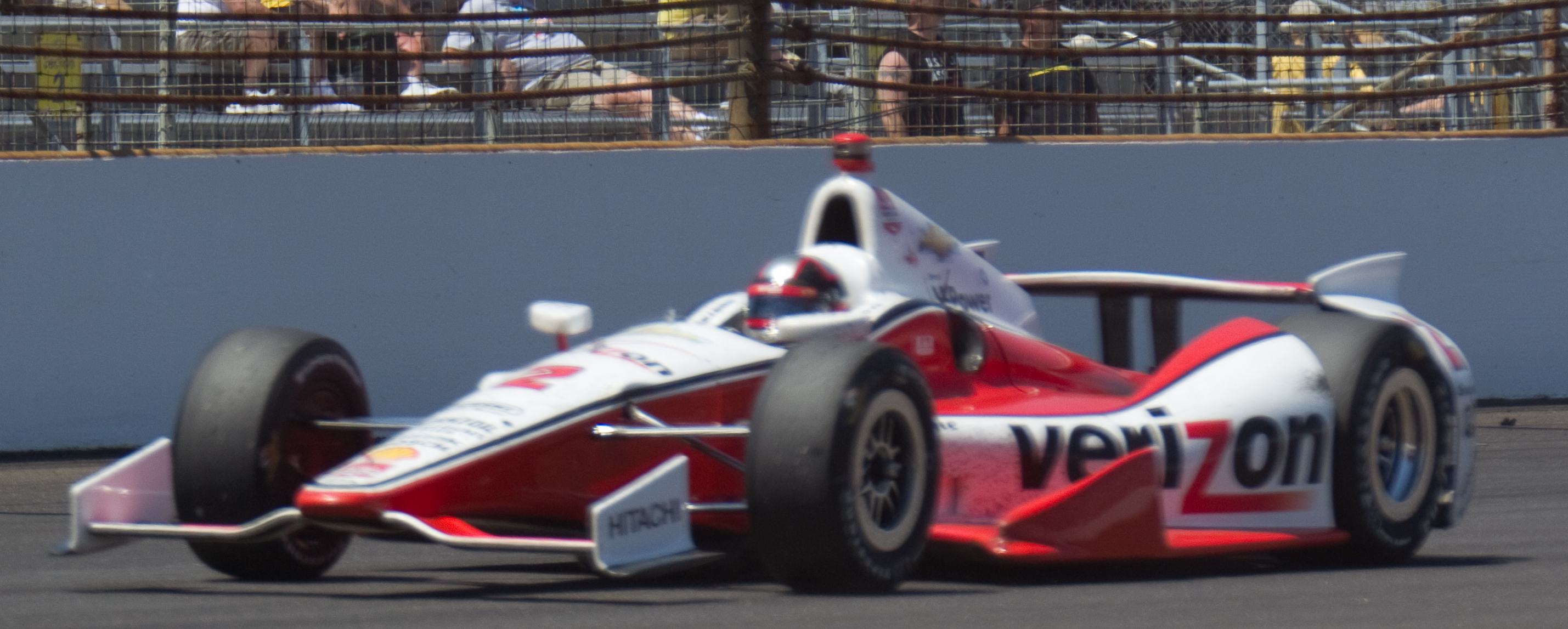
Montoya driving for Team Penske in the 2014 Indianapolis 500

Montoya drove the No. 2 Dallara DW12-Chevrolet car. He performed well on oval circuits, but qualified worse on the road and street circuits due to a lack of pre-season testing on Firestone's alternate Red compound tyre, which was not made accessible to teams by the manufacturer or IndyCar, but could improve his finishing position. Montoya had five top-ten finishes in the season's first ten races, including a second-place in the first race at the Grand Prix of Houston. He qualified on pole for the Pocono IndyCar 500 and overtook Tony Kanaan with four laps remaining to win the fastest 500-mile race in IndyCar history with an average speed of 202.402 mph (325.734 km/h) and his first IndyCar victory in nearly fourteen years. Montoya finished the season with three more top-fives, including a second-place at Milwaukee, and was fourth overall with 586 points.

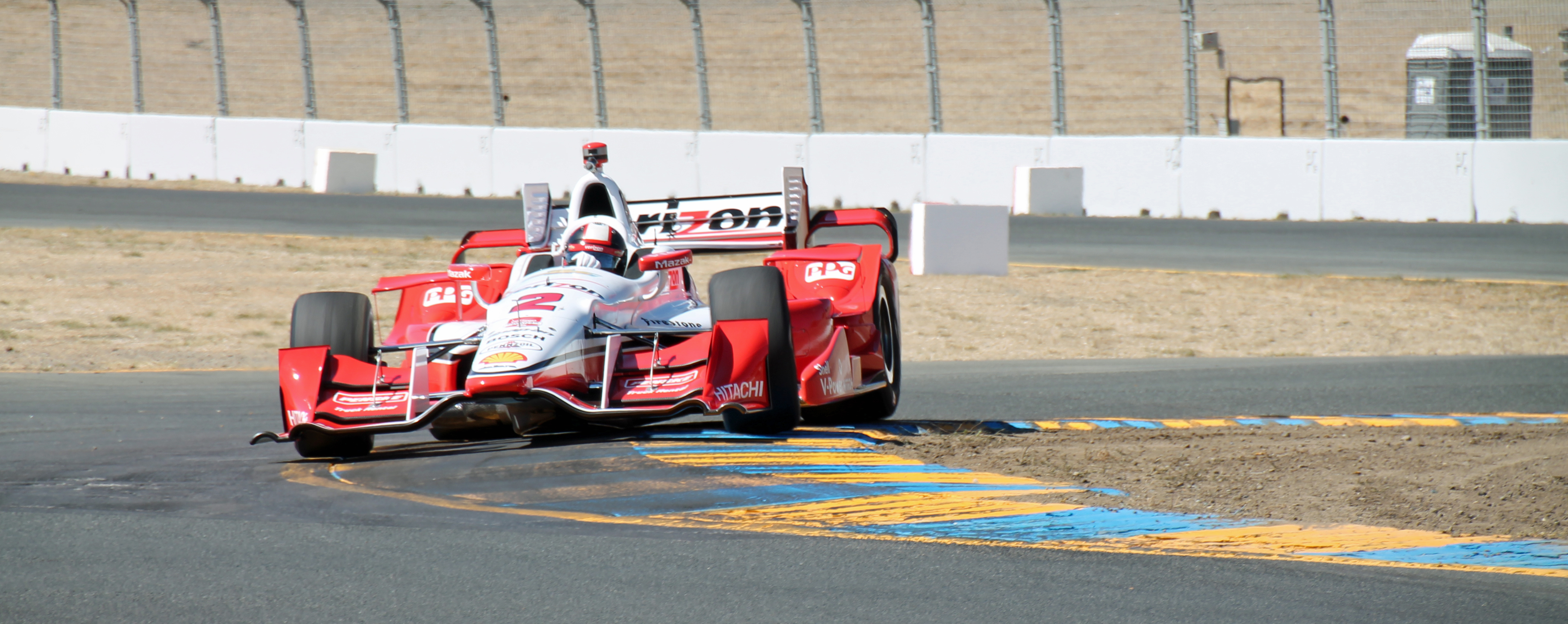
Montoya ended the 2015 IndyCar Series tied on points with Scott Dixon after finishing sixth at the GoPro Grand Prix of Sonoma but lost the title on countback.

Montoya continued driving for Penske in the 2015 IndyCar Series, improving his performance in qualifying from the previous season. Montoya started fourth and led the final 27 laps of the season-opening Firestone Grand Prix of St. Petersburg, holding off Penske teammate Will Power to win the race and take the points lead. He qualified on pole for the Indy Grand Prix of Louisiana at NOLA Motorsports Park and led 31 laps before pit stops and two caution periods dropped him to fifth place. Montoya then finished third in the Toyota Grand Prix of Long Beach and the Grand Prix of Indianapolis.

His season highlight was winning the Indianapolis 500 for the second time. (Note: The victory set the record for the longest period of time between two victories – fifteen years between the 2000 and 2015 races.) Montoya battled Power and CGR's Scott Dixon for the win in the final laps, eventually passing Power with three laps to go. Following that, he continuously finished in the top ten in the next six rounds as he drove conservatively until an accident at Iowa caused by suspension failure dropped him to 24th, although he retained the points lead due to other drivers' issues. Montoya's third-place finish at Pocono made him one of six drivers eligible for the championship at the season-ending GoPro Grand Prix of Sonoma. He finished sixth following a collision with Power and ended the season with the same number of points as Dixon (556) but lost the championship on tiebreak to Dixon, who had won three races to Montoya's two.

For the 2016 IndyCar Series, Montoya continued to race for Penske. Montoya's average qualifying performance dropped from the previous season, however he occasionally raced quicker during a race after a poor qualifying. He started third and led 44 of the 110 laps of the Firestone Grand Prix of St. Petersburg before passing teammate Simon Pagenaud to win. Montoya started third and led 56 laps in the following Desert Diamond West Valley Phoenix Grand Prix in Phoenix when a flat tyre forced an early pit stop and left him in ninth place, moving Pagenaud into the championship lead. He took three more top-tens before an early racing collision in the Indianapolis 500 left him in 33rd place, putting him in a points deficit. Montoya ended the season with five top-tens, and he placed third at Sonoma for eighth in the drivers' standings with 433 points.

=== 2017–2022 ===
Cindric informed Montoya in July 2016 that his future at Penske did not necessarily imply that he would race for them full-time in IndyCar. Montoya was given a spot in Penske's fifth entry for the 2017 Indianapolis 500, but he discussed returning to CGR as well as joining Ed Carpenter Racing, A. J. Foyt Racing, or Andretti Autosport for the entire season. He did not reach an agreement with any other teams and remained at Penske for the Indianapolis 500 because he felt the team would give him the best chance of winning. Montoya entered both the IndyCar Grand Prix and the Indianapolis 500 in the 2017 IndyCar Series. He finished tenth in the first round and sixth in the Indianapolis 500 despite running out of fuel before a pit stop.

IndyCar chose Montoya to be the test driver of Chevrolet's specification of the Dallara universal aerodynamic kit at the Indianapolis Motor Speedway, Mid-Ohio Sports Car Course, Iowa Speedway, and a street circuit simulation at Sebring International Raceway before the kit's debut in the 2018 season. He talked about driving for Schmidt Peterson Motorsports in the 2018 Indianapolis 500, but team owner Sam Schmidt was told that team owner Roger Penske had vetoed such an agreement. Montoya would miss the race, focusing solely on his sports car career. Montoya talked to McLaren CEO Zak Brown about racing for his team in the 2019 Indianapolis 500, but could not do so as he was under contract to Penske.

Montoya drove Arrow McLaren SP's No. 86 Dallara-Chevrolet third car in the 2021 IndyCar Series for the GMR Grand Prix and the Indianapolis 500. He qualified outside the top-twenty in both races and finished 21st and ninth, respectively. Montoya drove the No. 6 Arrow McLaren SP car in both the GMR Grand Prix and the Indianapolis 500 during the 2022 season. He finished 24th in the weather-affected GMR Grand Prix following an accident, and eleventh in the Indianapolis 500 after starting 30th.

== Sports car racing ==
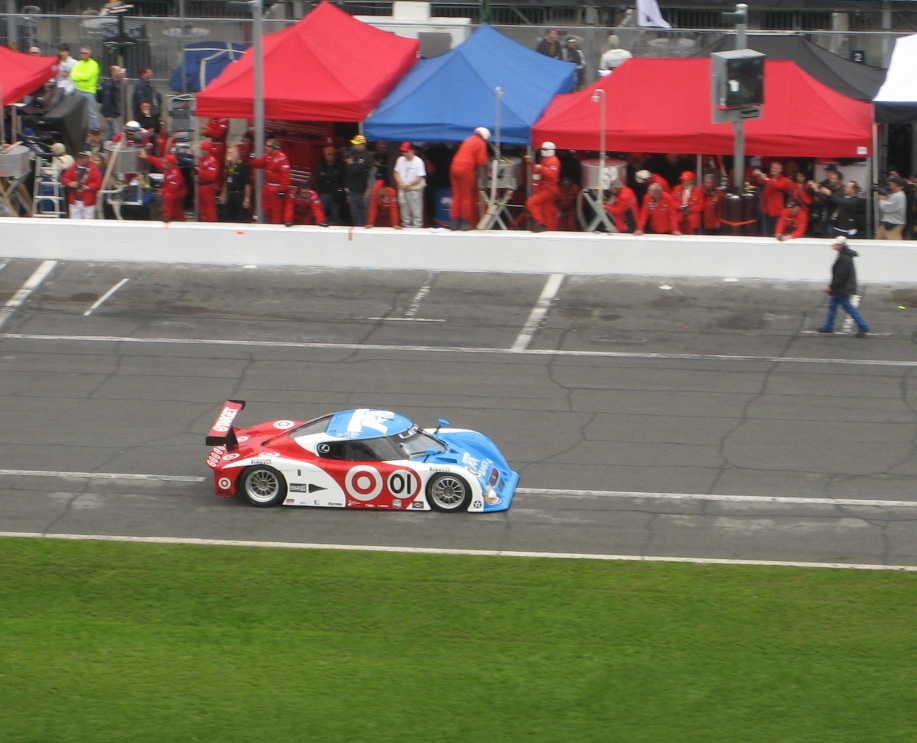
Montoya won the 24 Hours of Daytona for the second time in 2008

Montoya made his professional endurance debut in the 2007 24 Hours of Daytona (part of the Rolex Sports Car Series), winning after 668 laps in the No. 1 Chip Ganassi Racing with Felix Sabates (CGRFS) Riley MkXI-Lexus Daytona Prototype (DP) car he shared with Salvador Durán and Pruett. The following year, he won the 2008 24 Hours of Daytona for the second successive year, this time with Franchitti, Pruett and Memo Rojas after 695 laps. Montoya returned to CGRFS for the 2009 24 Hours of Daytona, partnering with Pruett and Rojas in a Riley MkXX-Lexus DP car and finishing second overall after losing the win to Brumos Racing by a record-close 0.167 seconds. He partook in the 24 Hours of Daytona in the No. 2 Riley MkXX-BMW with Dixon, Franchitti and McMurray from 2010 to 2012. They were 37th in 2010 after mechanical failure, but came second and fourth in 2011 and 2012, respectively.

Montoya, Dixon, and McMurray finished fourth in the Rolex Sports Car Series' three-hour Brickyard Grand Prix in Indianapolis in July 2012. He, Charlie Kimball, Pruett and Rojas won the 2013 24 Hours of Daytona in CGRFS' No. 01 Riley MkXXVI-BMW DP car, completing 709 laps. Montoya was invited by Porsche to participate in the post-season FIA World Endurance Championship (WEC) rookie test in a 919 Hybrid at the Bahrain International Circuit in November 2015. He guest tested a Risi Competizione-entered Ferrari 488 GTE in a test session at Sebring the month before the 2017 12 Hours of Sebring (part of the IMSA SportsCar Championship). To prepare for the 2018 IMSA SportsCar Championship in an Acura ARX-05 car in the Daytona Prototype International (DPi) category, Montoya drove the final round of the 2017 season, the Petit Le Mans, in the No. 6 Oreca 07-Gibson Le Mans Prototype 2 (LMP2) car alongside Hélio Castroneves and Pagenaud. Their car started on pole position and finished third overall after Castroneves collided with Matteo Cressoni's Ferrari.

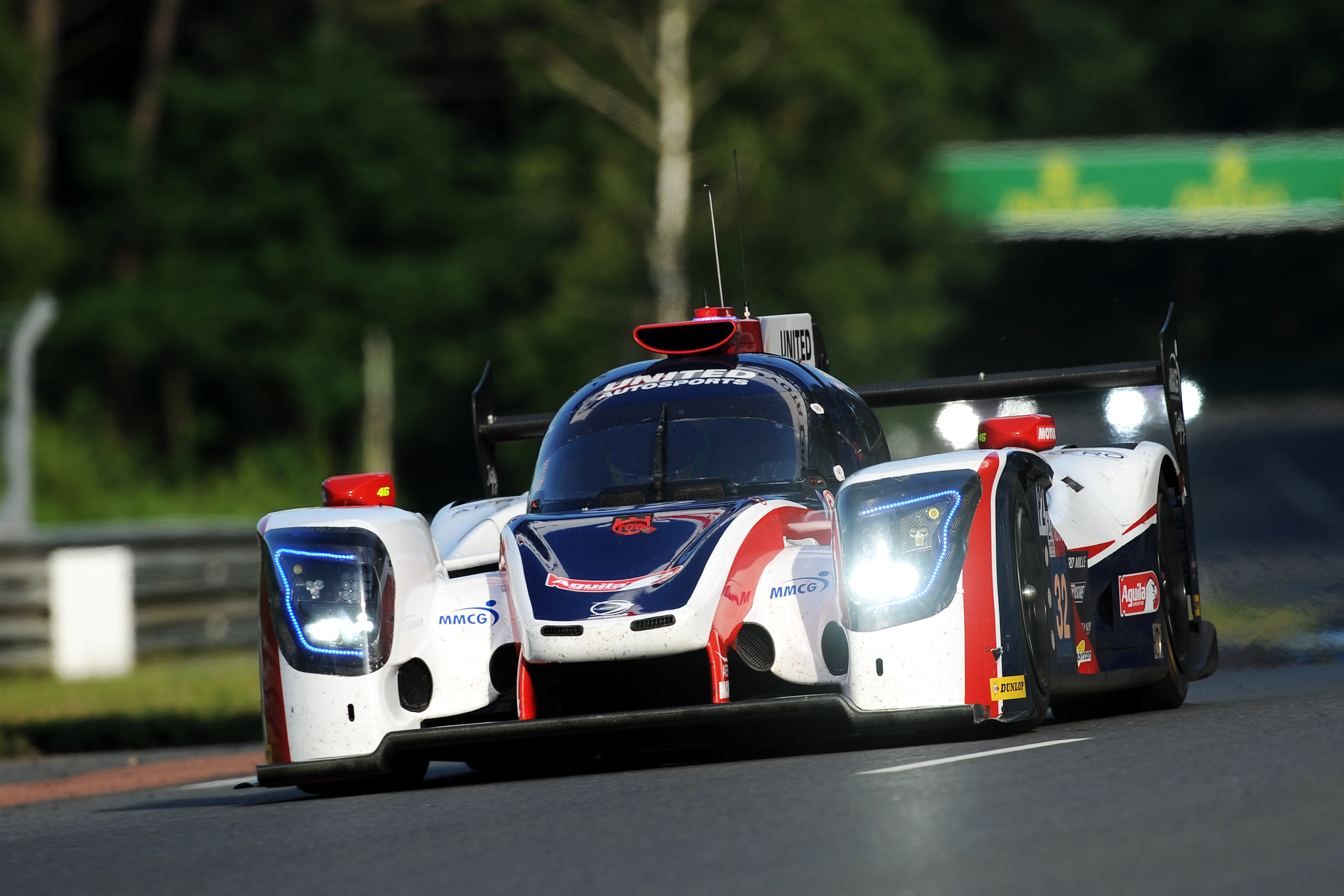
The United Autosports-fielded Ligier JS P217-Gibson car Montoya shared with Hugo de Sadeleer and Will Owen at the 2018 24 Hours of Le Mans.

Montoya officially joined Penske's IMSA programme in August 2017, having previously expressed interest in IMSA. Montoya shared the No. 6 car by Dane Cameron for the season and Pagenaud for three endurance races. Mechanical issues hampered his performance in the first two races, the 24 Hours of Daytona and the 12 Hours of Sebring. Montoya took pole position for the BUBBA Burger Sports Car Grand Prix and led 23 laps before finishing fifth. He finished in the top ten five more times before crashing in the second hour of the Petit Le Mans, leaving his car 32nd overall. Montoya was fifth in both the Prototype Drivers' Championship (251 points) and the North American Endurance Cup (NAEC). In June, he made his 24 Hours of Le Mans début in United Autosports' No. 32 Ligier JS P217-Gibson car with Hugo de Sadeleer and Will Owen. The car finished third in LMP2 and seventh overall.

Montoya returned to Penske for the 2019 season in the new DPi category, accompanied by Cameron for the year and Pagenaud for three endurance events. His performance improved as he and Cameron focused more on a common chassis setup that did not favour one driver over another. Montoya finished no worse than ninth in the first three races of the season before his first IMSA victory in the Acura Sports Car Challenge at Mid-Ohio after leading 88 laps from third. He took his second successive win in the Chevrolet Sports Car Classic in Detroit, starting from pole position. Montoya then took three straight podium finishes before winning the Monterey Grand Prix at Laguna Seca after leading a race-high 75 laps. Finishing fourth at the season-ending Petit Le Mans earned him and Cameron the DPi Drivers' Championship with 302 points, and they were sixth in the NAEC.

For the 2020 championship, Montoya returned to Penske's programme and was paired with Cameron for that year, with Pagenaud serving as the endurance driver. He started the season fourth at the 24 Hours of Daytona and finished no worse than ninth in the final eight rounds and qualifying on pole three times. He took sixth in the DPi Drivers' Championship with 247 points and was third in the NAEC. Montoya drove the No. 21 DragonSpeed USA Oreca 07-Gibson entry for the 2020 24 Hours of Le Mans alongside Timothé Buret and Rojas after an arrangement with Pipo Derani fell through. The car was retired after 192 laps due to a misfire.

Montoya joined Meyer Shank Racing with Curb-Agajanian in the 2021 IMSA SportsCar Championship as an endurance driver of its No. 60 Acura ARX-05 car alongside A. J. Allmendinger, Cameron, Castroneves, and Olivier Pla and was part of DragonSpeed USA's No. 21 WEC team with Ben Hanley and Henrik Hedman. He finished in the top ten of all three IMSA races he entered. Montoya finished fourth in the Endurance Trophy for LMP2 Pro/Am Drivers with 138 points in the 2021 WEC season after finishing no lower than fifth in each of the season's six races and winning his class in the 2021 24 Hours of Le Mans. He was invited to compete in the European Le Mans Series' (ELMS) 4 Hours of Monza for DragonSpeed with Hanley and Hedman in July, finishing seventeenth overall.

Montoya shared the No. 81 DragonSpeed – 10Star Oreca LMP2 car for six points-scoring races in the 2022 IMSA SportsCar Championship with Hedman and his son Sebastián. He finished no lower than eighth in class in those six events and won his category in the Lexus Grand Prix at Mid-Ohio. Montoya finished fourth in the LMP2 Drivers' Championship with 1878 points and seventh in the NAEC. He was scheduled to enter three races of the 2023 IMSA SportsCar Championship in Rick Ware Racing's No. 51 Oreca car alongside Eric Lux. Montoya returned to compete with DragonSpeed in the entire ELMS season in 2023 alongside Hedman and Sebastián, ending the season seventh in the LMP2 Pro-Am points standings with 44 scored and a best class finish of fifth twice.

== Race of Champions ==
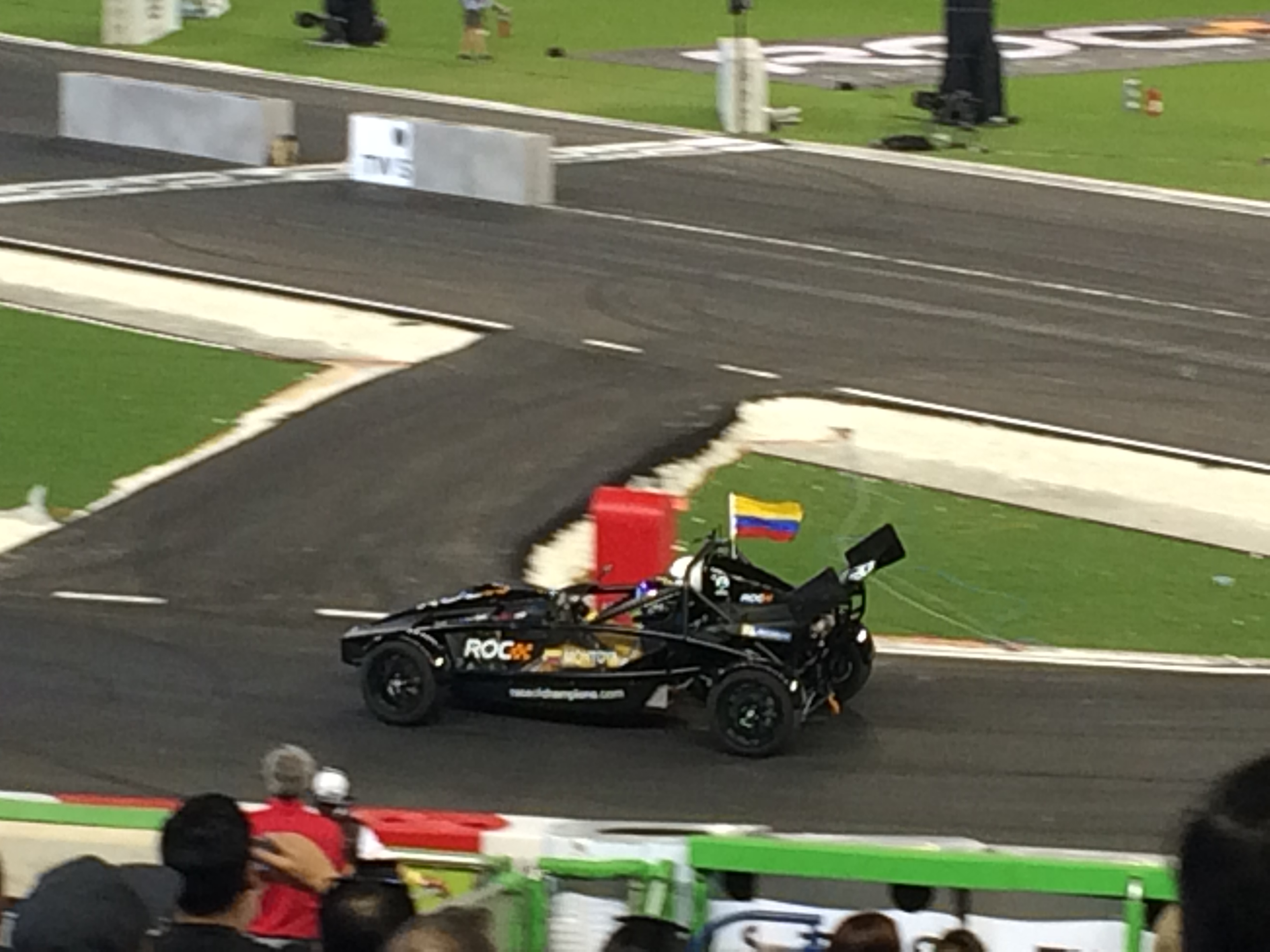
Montoya entered the Race of Champions for the first time in 2017

Montoya has twice competed in the Race of Champions. He had previously declined invites to the event, but agreed to compete in the 2017 Race of Champions at Marlins Park in Miami on his wife's suggestion, and won the Race of Champions by defeating Tom Kristensen 2–0 in the final. Team Colombia's Montoya and Gabby Chaves were eliminated in the Nations Cup semi-finals by Team Germany's Sebastian Vettel. He was eliminated by Kristensen in the Race of Champions quarterfinals, and he and Castroneves finished second against Team Germany's Timo Bernhard and René Rast in the Nations Cup at the King Fahd International Stadium in Riyadh in 2018.

== Driving style ==
Montoya has had an aggressive driving style since childhood, which led to him being involved in numerous incidents in NASCAR. Driver Derek Daly wrote that Montoya lacked technical knowledge of a racing car because he was not taught by a championship or a racing squad and needed two or three engineers to compensate for his inability to provide accurate technical feedback, which became more apparent as his F1 career progressed. He observed that the driver denied having such a flaw and frequently blamed other variables for his poor performance. Daly, however, stated that Montoya relied heavily on reflexes and intuition during his youth racing and CART career. Autosport's Nigel Roebuck observed in November 2004 that Montoya was emotionally driven and impervious to being pressured from behind.

== Non-racing ventures and recognition ==
Montoya has been represented by the management firms CSS Stellar and William Morris Agency. He has been an ambassador for the Swiss watchmaker TAG Heuer, and the Miami Grand Prix. Montoya was made a goodwill ambassador for the United Nations (UN) in October 2001 and helped to raise funding for the World Food Programme to feed children displaced by the Colombian conflict. Upon becoming an UN Goodwill Ambassador, he and his wife established the non-profit Fundación Formula Sonrisas (English: Formula Smiles Foundation) in 2003 and focuses on reducing gender and social inequality by educating children living in the deprived areas of Colombia through sport and physical education.

Montoya married law graduate Connie Freydell in Cartagena, Colombia on 26 October 2002. They have three children, one of them, Sebastián, is also a racing driver. He builds and flies radio-controlled aircraft. Montoya made a cameo appearance as a racing driver in the 2001 film Driven. He began working for Motorsport.tv as a presenter providing insight and opinions in news programmes and be part of its creative team for long-form documentaries in May 2021. In early November 2013, the Internal Revenue Service stated that he owed US$2.7 million in additional taxes and penalties due to disallowed deductions from 2007 and 2008. Montoya stated that he had earned $800,000 more than his reported income, but filed a challenge to the audit in the United States Tax Court.

Montoya received the Order of Boyacá and the Order of José Acevedo y Gómez in 1999; the Indianapolis 500 Rookie of the Year in 2000; the Rookie of the Year and the International Driver of the Year at the Autosport Awards in 2001 and 2003; and the Colombian Athlete of the Year in 2001; Montoya also won the Laureus World Sports Award for Breakthrough of the Year, the Ibero-American Community Trophy as the best Ibero-American athlete and the Lorenzo Bandini Trophy "in recognition of his achievements for his debut season in Formula One last year" in 2002. He was voted the top Latin American driver at the Premios Fox Sports Awards in both 2003 and 2005. Montoya was inducted into the Miami Sports Hall of Champions in 2011 and the Long Beach Motorsports Walk of Fame in 2018. The Kartódromo Juan Pablo Montoya in Tocancipá is named after him.

Montoya became one of the presenters on Apple TV's coverage for the 2026 Formula One World Championship season.

== Bibliography ==
- Girard, Greg; Lambot, Ian; Newsome, Philip (1998). Macau Grand Prix: The Road to Success. Haslemere, Surrey: Watermark Publications. ISBN 1-873-200-21-8 – via Internet Archive.
- "The newcomer: Juan Pablo Montoya". Formula One – The 2000 Season. Translated by Penfold, Chuck. Neckarsulm, Germany: Mixing Medienprodukt. 2000. ISBN 8-02-253580-X – via Internet Archive.
- Domenjoz, Luc, ed. (2001). Formula 1 Yearbook 2001–2002. Bath, Somerset: Parragon. ISBN 0-75256-639-3 – via Open Library.
- Mansell, Nigel, ed. (2001). The Official 2001–2002 Formula One Record Book. Holborn, London: European Press Ltd. ISBN 0-9541368-0-2 – via Open Library.
- Domenjoz, Luc, ed. (2002). Formula 1 Yearbook 2002–2003. Bath, Somerset: Parragon. ISBN 0-75259-146-0 – via Open Library.
- Willis, John (2002). Monush, Barry (ed.). Screen World. Vol. 53. New York City, United States: Applause Theatre & Cinema Books. ISBN 1-55783-598-5 – via Internet Archive.
- Jones, Bruce (2003). Formula One Grand Prix 2003: The Official ITV Sport Guide. London, England: Carlton Books. ISBN 1-84222-813-7 – via Internet Archive.
- Domenjoz, Luc, ed. (2003). Formula 1 Yearbook 2003–2004. Bath, Somerset: Parragon. ISBN 1-40542-089-8 – via Open Library.
- Domenjoz, Luc, ed. (2004). Formula 1 Yearbook 2004–2005. Bath, Somerset: Parragon. ISBN 2-84707-072-9 – via Open Library.
- Hilton, Christopher (April 2003). Juan Pablo Montoya. Sparkford, Somerset: Haynes Publishing. ISBN 1-85960-998-8 – via Internet Archive.
- Jones, Bruce (2004). The Official ITV Sport Guide: 2004 FIA Formula One World Championship. Carlton Books. ISBN 1-84442-811-7 – via Internet Archive.
- Jones, Bruce (2005). The Official ITV Sport Guide: Grand Prix 2005. Carlton Books. ISBN 1-84442-578-9 – via Internet Archive.
- Jones, Bruce (2006). Grand Prix 2006. London, England: Carlton Books. ISBN 978-1-84442-341-5 – via Open Library.
- Jones, Bruce (2007). Grand Prix 2007. London, England: Carlton Books. ISBN 978-1-84442-088-9 – via Open Library.
- Friedman, Ian C. (2007). "Juan Pablo Montoya". A to Z of Latino Americans - Latino Athletes. New York City, United States: Facts On File. pp. 142–143. ISBN 978-0-8160-6384-0 – via Internet Archive.
- Daly, Derek (2008). Race to Win: How to Become a Complete Champion Driver. Saint Paul, Minnesota: Motorbooks. ISBN 978-0-7603-3185-9 – via Internet Archive.
- Woods, Sarah; McColl, Richard (September 2015) [April 2008]. "Colombia's Fastest Guy". Colombia (Third ed.). Chalfont St Peter, England: Bradt Travel Guides. ISBN 978-1-84162-921-6 – via Google Books.

Sporting positions
Preceded by Ricardo Zonta	International Formula 3000 Champion; 1998	Succeeded by Nick Heidfeld
Preceded by Alex Zanardi	CART FedEx Championship Series Champion; 1999	Succeeded by Gil de Ferran
Preceded by Kenny Bräck; Ryan Hunter-Reay	Indianapolis 500 Winner; 2000; 2015	Succeeded by Hélio Castroneves; Alexander Rossi
Preceded by Sebastian Vettel	Race of Champions; Champion of Champions; 2017	Succeeded by David Coulthard
Preceded by Eric Curran; Felipe Nasr	WeatherTech SportsCar Championship champion 2019; With: Dane Cameron	Succeeded by Hélio Castroneves; Ricky Taylor
Awards
Preceded by Tony Kanaan	CART Rookie of the Year; 1999	Succeeded by Kenny Bräck
Preceded by Robby McGehee	Indianapolis 500 Rookie of the Year; 2000	Succeeded by Hélio Castroneves
Preceded by Denny Hamlin	NASCAR Nextel Cup Series Rookie of the Year; 2007	Succeeded by Regan Smith
Preceded by Jenson Button	Autosport; Rookie of the Year; 2001	Succeeded by Mark Webber
Preceded by Jenson Button	Lorenzo Bandini Trophy; 2002	Succeeded by Michael Schumacher
Preceded by Michael Schumacher	Autosport; International Driver of the Year; 2003	Succeeded by Jenson Button
Records
Preceded by ?????	Fastest Grand Prix qualifying lap 259.828 km/h (2002 Italian GP)	Succeeded by Rubens Barrichello; 260.395 km/h (2004 Italian GP)
