= Career results of Juan Pablo Montoya =

Juan Pablo Montoya Roldán is a Colombian racing driver. Montoya is one of three drivers to win at least one race in Indy car racing, Formula One, and the NASCAR Cup Series. He also won two legs of the Triple Crown of Motorsport in its more recent definition.

== Career summary ==
Season	Series	Team	Races	Wins	Poles	Points	Position
1994	Barber Saab Pro Series	N/A	12	2	1	114	**3rd**
1995	British Formula Vauxhall	Paul Stewart Racing	14	3	3	125	**3rd**
1996	British Formula 3	Fortec Motorsport	16	2	1	137	5th
1996	International Touring Car Championship	Warsteiner Mercedes-AMG	2	0	0	0	NC
1997	International Formula 3000	RSM Marko	9	3	3	37.5	**2nd**
1997	Formula One	Rothmans Williams Renault	Test driver				
1998	International Formula 3000	Super Nova Racing	12	4	7	65	**1st**
1998	Formula One	Winfield Williams	Test driver				
1999	CART	Chip Ganassi Racing	20	7	7	212	**1st**
2000	CART	Chip Ganassi Racing	20	3	7	126	9th
2000	Indy Racing League	Chip Ganassi Racing	1	1	0	54	25th
2001	Formula One	BMW Williams F1 Team	17	1	3	31	6th
2002	Formula One	BMW Williams F1 Team	17	0	7	50	**3rd**
2003	Formula One	BMW Williams F1 Team	16	2	1	82	**3rd**
2004	Formula One	BMW Williams F1 Team	18	1	0	58	5th
2005	Formula One	West McLaren Mercedes	16	3	2	60	4th
2006	Formula One	Team McLaren Mercedes	10	0	0	26	8th
2006	NASCAR Busch	Chip Ganassi Racing	4	0	0	438	68th
2006	NASCAR Nextel Cup	Chip Ganassi Racing	1	0	0	61	69th
2007	NASCAR Nextel Cup	Chip Ganassi Racing	36	1	0	3487	20th
2007	24 Hours of Daytona	Chip Ganassi Racing	1	1	0	N/A	**1st**
2007	NASCAR Busch Series	Chip Ganassi Racing	17	1	0	1689	36th
2008	NASCAR Nationwide Series	Chip Ganassi Racing	2	0	0	230	86th
2008	NASCAR Sprint Cup	Chip Ganassi Racing	36	0	0	3329	25th
2008	Rolex 24 at Daytona	Chip Ganassi Racing	1	1	0	N/A	**1st**
2009	NASCAR Sprint Cup	Earnhardt Ganassi Racing	36	0	2	6252	8th
2009	Rolex 24 at Daytona	Chip Ganassi Racing	1	0	0	N/A	**2nd**
2010	NASCAR Sprint Cup	Earnhardt Ganassi Racing	36	1	3	4118	17th
2010	Rolex 24 at Daytona	Chip Ganassi Racing	1	0	0	N/A	15th
2011	NASCAR Sprint Cup	Earnhardt Ganassi Racing	36	0	2	932	21st
2011	Rolex 24 at Daytona	Chip Ganassi Racing	1	0	0	N/A	**2nd**
2012	Rolex 24 at Daytona	Chip Ganassi Racing	1	0	0	N/A	4th
2012	Rolex Sports Car Series	Chip Ganassi Racing	2	0	0	56	21st
2012	NASCAR Sprint Cup	Earnhardt Ganassi Racing	36	0	2	810	22nd
2013	NASCAR Sprint Cup	Earnhardt Ganassi Racing	36	0	0	894	21st
2013	Rolex 24 at Daytona	Chip Ganassi Racing	1	0	0	N/A	**1st**
2014	IndyCar Series	Team Penske	18	1	1	586	4th
2014	NASCAR Sprint Cup	Team Penske	2	0	0	26	48th
2015	IndyCar Series	Team Penske	16	2	2	556	**2nd**
2016	IndyCar Series	Team Penske	16	1	0	433	8th
2017	IMSA SportsCar Championship - DPi	Team Penske	1	0	0	30	30th
2018	IMSA SportsCar Championship - DPi	Acura Team Penske	10	0	1	251	5th
2018	24 Hours of Le Mans - LMP2	United Autosports	1	0	0	N/A	**3rd**
2019	IMSA SportsCar Championship - DPi	Acura Team Penske	10	3	3	302	**1st**
2020	IMSA SportsCar Championship - DPi	Acura Team Penske	9	0	1	247	6th
2021	IndyCar Series	Arrow McLaren SP	2	0	0	53	31st
2021	IMSA SportsCar Championship - DPi	Meyer Shank Racing with Curb Agajanian	4	0	0	912	14th
2021	FIA World Endurance Championship - LMP2	DragonSpeed USA	6	0	0	42.5	11th
2021	European Le Mans Series - LMP2	DragonSpeed USA	1	0	0	0.5	34th
2022	IndyCar Series	Arrow McLaren SP	2	0	0	44	31st
2022	IMSA SportsCar Championship - LMP2	DragonSpeed - 10 Star	6	1	0	1878	4th
2023	European Le Mans Series - LMP2 Pro-Am	DragonSpeed USA	6	0	0	44	7th
2023	IMSA SportsCar Championship - LMP2	Rick Ware Racing	1	0	0	286	26th
2024	NASCAR Cup Series	23XI Racing	1	0	0	5	43rd

^{*} Season still in progress.

=== Complete British Formula Three Championship results ===
(key) (Races in bold indicate pole position; races in italics indicate fastest lap)

Year	Entrant	1	2	3	4	5	6	7	8	9	10	11	12	13	14	15	16	DC	Points
1996	Fortec Motorsport	SIL; 2	SIL; 12	THR; 4	DON; 1	BRH; 12	BRH; 2	OUL; 9	DON; 13	SIL; 7	THR; 1	SNE; 3	PEM; 4	PEM; 6	**ZAN**; 4	ZAN; Ret	SIL; 5	5th	137

=== Complete International Formula 3000 results ===
(key) (Races in bold indicate pole position; races in italics indicate fastest lap)

Year	Entrant	1	2	3	4	5	6	7	8	9	10	11	12	DC	Points
1997	RSM Marko	SIL; Ret	**PAU**; 1	**HEL**; Ret	NÜR; 4	PER; 11	HOC; 5	**A1R**; 1	SPA; DSQ	MUG; 3	JER; 1			**2nd**	**37.5**
1998	Super Nova Racing	**OSC**; 15	**IMO**; Ret	**CAT**; 1	**SIL**; 1	MON; 6	**PAU**; 1	A1R; 2	HOC; 3	HUN; 3	**SPA**; 2	PER; 1	**NÜR**; 3	**1st**	**65**

=== CART Championship Series ===
(key) (Races in bold indicate pole position; races in italics indicate fastest lap)

Year	Team	No.	Chassis	Engine	1	2	3	4	5	6	7	8	9	10	11	12	13	14	15	16	17	18	19	20	Rank	Points	Ref
1999	Chip Ganassi Racing	4	Reynard	Honda	MIA; 10	MOT; 13	LBH; 1	**NAZ**; 1	RIO; 1	**GAT**; 11	MIL; 10	**POR**; 2	**CLE**; 1	ROA; 13	TOR; 22	MCH; 2	**DET**; 17	MOH; 1	CHI; 1	**VAN**; 1	LAG; 8	**HOU**; 25	SUR; 16	FON; 4	**1st**	**212**	
2000	Chip Ganassi Racing	1	Lola	Toyota	MIA; 23	LBH; 19	RIO; 22	**MOT**; 7	**NAZ**; 4	**MIL**; 1	**DET**; 18	POR; 17	CLE; 6	TOR; 24	MCH; 1	**CHI**; 12	MOH; 24	ROA; 16	VAN; 17	LAG; 6	**GAT**; 1	HOU; 2	**SUR**; 24	FON; 10	**9th**	**126**	

=== IndyCar Series ===
(key) (Races in bold indicate pole position; races in italics indicate fastest lap)

Year	Team	No.	Chassis	Engine	1	2	3	4	5	6	7	8	9	10	11	12	13	14	15	16	17	18	Rank	Points	Ref
2000	Target Chip Ganassi Racing	9	G-Force	Oldsmobile	WDW	PHX	LVS	INDY; 1*	TXS	PPIR	ATL	KTY	TXS										25th	54	
2014	Team Penske	2	Dallara DW12	Chevrolet	STP; 15	LBH; 4	ALA; 21	IMS; 16	INDY; 5	DET; 12	DET; 13	TEX; 3	HOU; 2	HOU; 7	**POC**; 1	IOW; 16	TOR; 18	TOR; 19	MOH; 11	MIL; 2	SNM; 5	FON; 4	4th	586	
2015	Team Penske	2	Dallara DW12	Chevrolet	STP; 1	**NLA**; 5	LBH; 3	ALA; 14	IMS; 3	INDY; 1	DET; 10	**DET**; 10	TEX; 4	TOR; 7	FON; 4	MIL; 4	IOW; 24	MOH; 11	POC; 3	SNM; 6			2nd^{a}	556	
2016	Team Penske	2	Dallara DW12	Chevrolet	STP; 1	PHX; 9	LBH; 4	ALA; 5	IMS; 8	INDY; 33	DET; 3	DET; 20	RDA; 7	IOW; 20	TOR; 20	MOH; 11	POC; 8	TXS; 9	WGL; 13	SNM; 3			8th	433	
2017	Team Penske	22	Dallara DW12	Chevrolet	STP	LBH	ALA	PHX	IMS; 10	INDY; 6	DET	DET	TXS	ROA	IOW	TOR	MOH	POC	GTW	WGL	SNM		24th	93	
2021	Arrow McLaren SP	86	Dallara DW12	Chevrolet	ALA	STP	TXS	TXS	IMS; 21	INDY; 9	DET	DET	ROA	MOH	NSH	IMS	GTW	POR	LAG	LBH			31st	53	
2022	Arrow McLaren SP	6	Dallara DW12	Chevrolet	STP	TXS	LBH	ALA	IMS; 24	INDY; 11	DET	ROA	MOH	TOR	IOW	IOW	IMS	NSH	GTW	POR	LAG		31st	44	

^{a} Montoya lost the title to Scott Dixon on a tiebreaker, after both tied on 556 points. He won two races compared to Dixon's three.

==== Indianapolis 500 results ====
Year	Chassis	Engine	Start	Finish	Team
2000	G-Force	Oldsmobile	2	**1**	Chip Ganassi Racing
2014	Dallara	Chevrolet	10	5	Team Penske
2015	Dallara	Chevrolet	15	**1**	Team Penske
2016	Dallara	Chevrolet	17	33	Team Penske
2017	Dallara	Chevrolet	18	6	Team Penske
2021	Dallara	Chevrolet	24	9	Arrow McLaren SP
2022	Dallara	Chevrolet	30	11	Arrow McLaren SP

===== Indianapolis 500 records =====
**Most races between victories** Ten* drivers have intervals between race victories extending five or more races.
**Years**	**Career Victories**		**Ref**
**15**	2000	2015	

**Most laps led by rookie** Eight drivers have led one quarter (50 laps / 125 miles) or further race distance in their first year of competition.
**Laps**	**Percent**; **Race Led**	**Year**	**Start**; **Pos**	**Final**; **Pos**	**Ref**
**167**	**83.5%**	2000	2	**1**	

=== Complete Formula One results ===
(key) (Races in bold indicate pole position; races in italics indicate fastest lap)

Year	Entrant	Chassis	Engine	1	2	3	4	5	6	7	8	9	10	11	12	13	14	15	16	17	18	19	WDC	Points
2001	BMW WilliamsF1 Team	Williams FW23	BMW P81 3.0 V10	AUS; Ret	MAL; Ret	BRA; Ret	SMR; Ret	ESP; 2	AUT; Ret	MON; Ret	CAN; Ret	EUR; 2	FRA; Ret	GBR; 4	**GER**; Ret	HUN; 8	**BEL**; Ret	**ITA**; 1	USA; Ret	JPN; 2			6th	31
2002	BMW WilliamsF1 Team	Williams FW24	BMW P82 3.0 V10	AUS; 2	MAL; 2	**BRA**; 5	SMR; 4	ESP; 2	AUT; 3	**MON**; Ret	**CAN**; Ret	**EUR**; Ret	**GBR**; 3	**FRA**; 4	GER; 2	HUN; 11	BEL; 3	**ITA**; Ret	USA; 4	JPN; 4			**3rd**	**50**
2003	BMW WilliamsF1 Team	Williams FW25	BMW P83 3.0 V10	AUS; 2	MAL; 12	BRA; Ret	SMR; 7	ESP; 4	AUT; Ret	MON; 1	CAN; 3	EUR; 2	FRA; 2	GBR; 2	**GER**; 1	HUN; 3	ITA; 2	USA; 6	JPN; Ret				**3rd**	**82**
2004	BMW WilliamsF1 Team	Williams FW26	BMW P84 3.0 V10	AUS; 5	MAL; 2	BHR; 13	SMR; 3	ESP; Ret	MON; 4	EUR; 8	CAN; DSQ	USA; DSQ	FRA; 8	GBR; 5	GER; 5	HUN; 4	BEL; Ret	ITA; 5	CHN; 5	JPN; 7	BRA; 1		5th	58
2005	West McLaren Mercedes	McLaren MP4-20	Mercedes FO 110R 3.0 V10	AUS; 6	MAL; 4	BHR	SMR	ESP; 7	MON; 5	EUR; 7	CAN; DSQ	USA; DNS	FRA; Ret	GBR; 1	GER; 2								4th	60
2005	Team McLaren Mercedes	McLaren MP4-20	Mercedes FO 110R 3.0 V10													HUN; Ret	TUR; 3	**ITA**; 1	**BEL**; 14^{†}	BRA; 1	JPN; Ret	CHN; Ret	4th	60
2006	Team McLaren Mercedes	McLaren MP4-21	Mercedes FO 108S 2.4 V8	BHR; 5	MAL; 4	AUS; Ret	SMR; 3	EUR; Ret	ESP; Ret	MON; 2	GBR; 6	CAN; Ret	USA; Ret	FRA	GER	HUN	TUR	ITA	CHN	JPN	BRA		8th	26

^{†} Did not finish, but was classified as he had completed more than 90% of the race distance.

==== Formula One records ====
Montoya set the record for the highest average lap speed during qualifying for the 2004 Italian Grand Prix, at 262.242 km/h (162.950 mph). He held the record until the 2018 Italian Grand Prix, held at the same venue, after Kimi Räikkönen set a lap time with an average speed of 263.587 km/h (163.785 mph).

=== NASCAR ===
(key) (Bold – Pole position awarded by qualifying time. Italics – Pole position earned by points standings or practice time. * – Most laps led.)

==== Cup Series ====
NASCAR Cup Series results
Year	Team	No.	Make	1	2	3	4	5	6	7	8	9	10	11	12	13	14	15	16	17	18	19	20	21	22	23	24	25	26	27	28	29	30	31	32	33	34	35	36	NCSC	Pts	Ref
2006	Chip Ganassi Racing	30	Dodge	DAY	CAL	LVS	ATL	BRI	MAR	TEX	PHO	TAL	RCH	DAR	CLT	DOV	POC	MCH	SON	DAY	CHI	NHA	POC	IND	GLN	MCH	BRI	CAL	RCH	NHA	DOV	KAN	TAL	CLT	MAR	ATL	TEX	PHO	HOM; 34	69th	61	
2007	Chip Ganassi Racing	42	Dodge	DAY; 19	CAL; 26	LVS; 22	ATL; 5	BRI; 32	MAR; 16	TEX; 8	PHO; 33	TAL; 31	RCH; 26	DAR; 23	CLT; 28	DOV; 31	POC; 20	MCH; 43	SON; 1	NHA; 19	DAY; 32	CHI; 15	IND; 2	POC; 16	GLN; 39	MCH; 26	BRI; 17	CAL; 33	RCH; 41	NHA; 23	DOV; 10	KAN; 28	TAL; 15	CLT; 37	MAR; 8	ATL; 34	TEX; 25	PHO; 17	HOM; 15	20th	3487	
2008	Chip Ganassi Racing	42	Dodge	DAY; 32	CAL; 20	LVS; 19	ATL; 16	BRI; 15	MAR; 13	TEX; 19	PHO; 16	TAL; 2	RCH; 32	DAR; 23	CLT; 30	DOV; 12	POC; 38	MCH; 38	SON; 6	NHA; 32	DAY; 38	CHI; 18	IND; 38	POC; 40	GLN; 4	MCH; 25	BRI; 19	CAL; 20	RCH; 31	NHA; 17	DOV; 39	KAN; 20	TAL; 25	CLT; 34	MAR; 14	ATL; 40	TEX; 43	PHO; 17	HOM; 17	25th	3329	
2009	Earnhardt Ganassi Racing	42	Chevy	DAY; 14	CAL; 11	LVS; 31	ATL; 27	BRI; 9	MAR; 12	TEX; 7	PHO; 24	**TAL**; 20	RCH; 10	DAR; 20	CLT; 8	DOV; 30	POC; 8	MCH; 6	SON; 6	NHA; 12	DAY; 9	CHI; 10	IND; 11*	POC; 2	GLN; 6	MCH; 19	BRI; 25	ATL; 3	RCH; 19	**NHA**; 3*	DOV; 4	KAN; 4	CAL; 3	CLT; 35	MAR; 3	TAL; 19	TEX; 37	PHO; 8	HOM; 38	8th	6252	
2010	Earnhardt Ganassi Racing	42	Chevy	DAY; 10	CAL; 37	LVS; 37	ATL; 3	BRI; 26	MAR; 36	PHO; 5	TEX; 34	TAL; 3	RCH; 6	DAR; 5	DOV; 35	CLT; 38	POC; 8	MCH; 13	SON; 10	**NHA**; 34	DAY; 27	CHI; 16	**IND**; 32*	POC; 16	GLN; 1*	MCH; 7	BRI; 7	ATL; 9	RCH; 7	NHA; 16	DOV; 14	KAN; 29	CAL; 14	CLT; 11	MAR; 19	**TAL**; 3	TEX; 28	PHO; 16	HOM; 35	17th	4118	
2011	Earnhardt Ganassi Racing	42	Chevy	DAY; 6	PHO; 19	LVS; 3	BRI; 24	**CAL**; 10	MAR; 4	TEX; 13	TAL; 30	**RCH**; 29	DAR; 23	DOV; 32	CLT; 12	KAN; 17	POC; 7	MCH; 30	SON; 22	DAY; 9	KEN; 15	NHA; 30	IND; 28	POC; 32	GLN; 7	MCH; 25	BRI; 19	ATL; 15	RCH; 15	CHI; 14	NHA; 9	DOV; 22	KAN; 23	CLT; 14	TAL; 23	MAR; 22	TEX; 18	PHO; 15	HOM; 31	21st	932	
2012	Earnhardt Ganassi Racing	42	Chevy	DAY; 36	PHO; 11	LVS; 25	BRI; 8	CAL; 17	MAR; 21	TEX; 16	KAN; 12	RCH; 12	TAL; 32	DAR; 24	CLT; 20	DOV; 28	POC; 17	MCH; 8	SON; 34	KEN; 14	DAY; 28	NHA; 25	IND; 21	**POC**; 20	**GLN**; 33	MCH; 26	BRI; 13	ATL; 21	RCH; 20	CHI; 23	NHA; 22	DOV; 26	TAL; 38	CLT; 19	KAN; 16	MAR; 20	TEX; 34	PHO; 12	HOM; 28	22nd	810	
2013	Earnhardt Ganassi Racing	42	Chevy	DAY; 39	PHO; 12	LVS; 19	BRI; 30	CAL; 38	MAR; 26	TEX; 20	KAN; 27	RCH; 4	TAL; 25	DAR; 8	CLT; 18	DOV; 2	POC; 14	MCH; 20	SON; 34	KEN; 16	DAY; 39	NHA; 24	IND; 9	POC; 28	GLN; 5	MCH; 11	BRI; 3	ATL; 7	RCH; 16	CHI; 32	NHA; 19	DOV; 23	KAN; 18	CLT; 12	TAL; 41	MAR; 13	TEX; 20	PHO; 6	HOM; 18	21st	894	
2014	Team Penske	12	Ford	DAY	PHO	LVS	BRI	CAL	MAR	TEX	DAR	RCH	TAL	KAN	CLT	DOV	POC	MCH; 18	SON	KEN	DAY	NHA	IND; 23	POC	GLN	MCH	BRI	ATL	RCH	CHI	NHA	DOV	KAN	CLT	TAL	MAR	TEX	PHO	HOM	48th	47	
2024	23XI Racing	50	Toyota	DAY	ATL	LVS	PHO	BRI	COA	RCH	MAR	TEX	TAL	DOV	KAN	DAR	CLT	GTW	SON	IOW	NHA	NSH	CSC	POC	IND	RCH	MCH	DAY	DAR	ATL	GLN; 32	BRI	KAN	TAL	ROV	LVS	HOM	MAR	PHO	43rd	5	

===== Daytona 500 =====
Year	Team	Manufacturer	Start	Finish
2007	Chip Ganassi Racing	Dodge	36	19
2008	Chip Ganassi Racing	Dodge	15	32
2009	Earnhardt Ganassi Racing	Chevrolet	8	14
2010	Earnhardt Ganassi Racing	Chevrolet	8	10
2011	Earnhardt Ganassi Racing	Chevrolet	13	6
2012	Earnhardt Ganassi Racing	Chevrolet	35	36
2013	Earnhardt Ganassi Racing	Chevrolet	7	39

==== Nationwide Series ====
NASCAR Nationwide Series results
Year	Team	No.	Make	1	2	3	4	5	6	7	8	9	10	11	12	13	14	15	16	17	18	19	20	21	22	23	24	25	26	27	28	29	30	31	32	33	34	35	NNSC	Pts	Ref
2006	Chip Ganassi Racing	42	Dodge	DAY	CAL	MXC	LVS	ATL	BRI	TEX	NSH	PHO	TAL	RCH	DAR	CLT	DOV	NSH	KEN	MLW	DAY	CHI	NHA	MAR	GTY	IRP	GLN	MCH	BRI	CAL	RCH	DOV	KAN	CLT	MEM; 11	TEX; 28	PHO; 20	HOM; 14	68th	438	
2007	Chip Ganassi Racing	42	Dodge	DAY; 40	CAL; 39	MXC; 1*	LVS; 20	ATL; 8	BRI; 14	NSH	TEX; 30	PHO; 21	TAL; 7	RCH; 11	DAR; 15	CLT; 40	DOV; 14	NSH	KEN	MLW	NHA; 34	DAY; 30	CHI; 21	GTY	IRP	CGV	GLN; 33	MCH	BRI	CAL	RCH	DOV	KAN	CLT	MEM	TEX	PHO	HOM	36th	1689	
2008	Chip Ganassi Racing	40	Dodge	DAY	CAL	LVS	ATL	BRI	NSH	TEX	PHO	MXC	TAL	RCH	DAR	CLT	DOV	NSH	KEN	MLW	NHA	DAY	CHI	GTY	IRP	CGV	GLN	MCH	BRI	CAL	RCH	DOV	KAN	CLT	MEM	TEX; 15	PHO		86th	230	
2008	Chip Ganassi Racing	42	Dodge																																			HOM; 17	86th	230	

=== ARCA Re/Max Series ===
(key) (Bold – Pole position awarded by qualifying time. Italics – Pole position earned by points standings or practice time. * – Most laps led.)

ARCA Re/Max Series results
Year	Team	No.	Make	1	2	3	4	5	6	7	8	9	10	11	12	13	14	15	16	17	18	19	20	21	22	23	ARMC	Pts	Ref
2006	Cunningham Motorsports	4	Dodge	DAY	NSH	SLM	WIN	KEN	TOL	POC	MCH	KAN	KEN	BLN	POC	GTW	NSH	MCH	ISF	MIL	TOL	DSF	CHI	SLM	TAL; 3	IOW; 24	84th	350	

=== Grand-Am ===
==== Daytona Prototype ====
Bold – Pole Position. (Overall Finish/Class Finish).

Year	Team	No.	Engine	Chassis	1	2	3	4	5	6	7	8	9	10	11	12	13	14	Pos	Pts
2007	Chip Ganassi Racing	01	Lexus 5.0L V8	Riley Technologies MkXI	DAY; 1	MEX	HOM	VIR	LGA	WGL	MOH	DAY	IOW	BAR	MON	WGL	SON	MIL	52nd	35
2008	Chip Ganassi Racing	01	Lexus 5.0L V8	Riley Technologies MkXX	DAY; 1	HOM	MEX	VIR	LGA	WGL	MOH	DAY	BAR	MON	WGL	SON	NJ	MIL	45th	35
2009	Chip Ganassi Racing	01	Lexus 5.0L V8	Riley Technologies Mk. XX	DAY; 2	VIR	NJ	LGA	WGL	MOH	DAY	BAR	WGL	MON	MIL	HOM			45th	32
2010	Chip Ganassi Racing	02	BMW 5.0L V8	Riley Technologies Mk. XX	DAY; 37/15	HOM	BAR	VIR	LRP	WGL	MOH	DAY	NJ	WGL	MON	MIL			41st	16
2011	Chip Ganassi Racing	02	BMW 5.0L V8	Riley Technologies Mk. XX	DAY; 2	HOM	BAR	VIR	LRP	WGL	ELK	LGA	NJ	WGL	MON	MOH			24th	32
2012	Chip Ganassi Racing	02	BMW 5.0L V8	Riley Technologies Mk. XXVI	DAY; 4	BAR	HOM	NJ	BEL	MOH	ELK	WGL	IMS; 4	WGL	MON	LGA	LRP		21st	56
2013	Chip Ganassi Racing	01	BMW 5.0L V8	Riley Technologies Mk. XXVI	DAY; 1	AUS	BAR	ATL	BEL	MOH	WGL	IMS	ELK	KAN	LGA	LRP			41st	35

=== Complete IMSA SportsCar Championship results ===
Year	Entrant	Class	Chassis	Engine	1	2	3	4	5	6	7	8	9	10	Rank	Points
2017	Team Penske	P	Oreca 07	Gibson GK428 4.2 L V8	DAY	SEB	LBH	COA	DET	WGL	MOS	ELK	LGA	PET; 3	30th	30
2018	Acura Team Penske	P	Acura ARX-05	Acura AR35TT 3.5 L Turbo V6	DAY; 10	SEB; 14	**LBH**; 5	MOH; 2	DET; 3	WGL; 3	MOS; 10	ELK; 5	LGA; 3	PET; 13	5th	251
2019	Acura Team Penske	DPi	Acura ARX-05	Acura AR35TT 3.5 L Turbo V6	DAY; 6	**SEB**; 9	LBH; 3	MOH; 1	**DET**; 1	WGL; 3	MOS; 3	**ELK**; 2	LGA; 1	PET; 4	1st	302
2020	Acura Team Penske	DPi	Acura ARX-05	Acura AR35TT 3.5 L Turbo V6	DAY; 4	DAY; 4	SEB; 6	ELK; 8	ATL; 6	**MOH**; 7	**PET**; 3	**LGA**; 2	SEB; 2		6th	247
2021	Meyer Shank Racing w/ Curb-Agajanian	DPi	Acura ARX-05	Acura AR35TT 3.5 L Turbo V6	DAY; 4	SEB; 3	MOH	DET	WGL	WGL	ELK	LGA	LBH	PET; 6	14th	912
2022	DragonSpeed - 10 Star	LMP2	Oreca 07	Gibson GK428 V8	DAY	SEB; 8	LGA; 3	MOH; 1	WGL; 5	ELK; 6	PET; 2				4th	1878
2023	Rick Ware Racing	LMP2	Oreca 07	Gibson GK428 4.2 L V8	DAY	SEB	LGA; 5	WGL	ELK	IMS	PET				26th	286

^{*} Season still in progress.

=== Complete 24 Hours of Le Mans results ===
Year	Team	Co-Drivers	Car	Class	Laps	Pos.	Class Pos.
2018	(United States) United Autosports	(Switzerland) Hugo de Sadeleer (United States) Will Owen	Ligier JS P217-Gibson	LMP2	365	7th	**3rd**
2020	(United States) DragonSpeed USA	(France) Timothé Buret (Mexico) Memo Rojas	Oreca 07-Gibson	LMP2	192	DNF	DNF
2021	(United States) DragonSpeed USA	(Sweden) Henrik Hedman (United Kingdom) Ben Hanley	Oreca 07-Gibson	LMP2	356	15th	10th
2021	(United States) DragonSpeed USA	(Sweden) Henrik Hedman (United Kingdom) Ben Hanley	Oreca 07-Gibson	LMP2 Pro-Am	356	15th	1st

=== Complete FIA World Endurance Championship results ===
(key) (Races in bold indicate pole position) (Races in italics indicate fastest lap)

Year	Entrant	Class	Car	Engine	1	2	3	4	5	6	Rank	Points
2021	DragonSpeed USA	LMP2	Oreca 07	Gibson GK428 4.2 L V8	SPA; 7	ALG; 8	MNZ; 6	LMS; 10	BHR; 11	BHR; 10	11th	42.5
2021	DragonSpeed USA	LMP2 Pro-Am	Oreca 07	Gibson GK428 4.2 L V8	SPA; 3	ALG; 2	MNZ; 2	LMS; 1	BHR; 5	BHR; 4	4th	138

=== Complete European Le Mans Series results ===
Year	Entrant	Class	Chassis	Engine	1	2	3	4	5	6	Rank	Points
2021	DragonSpeed USA	LMP2	Oreca 07	Gibson GK428 4.2 L V8	CAT	RBR	LEC	MNZ; 17	SPA	ALG	34th	0.5
2023	DragonSpeed USA	LMP2 Pro-Am	Oreca 07	Gibson GK428 4.2 L V8	CAT; 7	LEC; 7	ARA; 7	SPA; 7	ALG; 5	ALG; 5	7th	44
