= Williams FW25 =

Formula One car for 2003 season

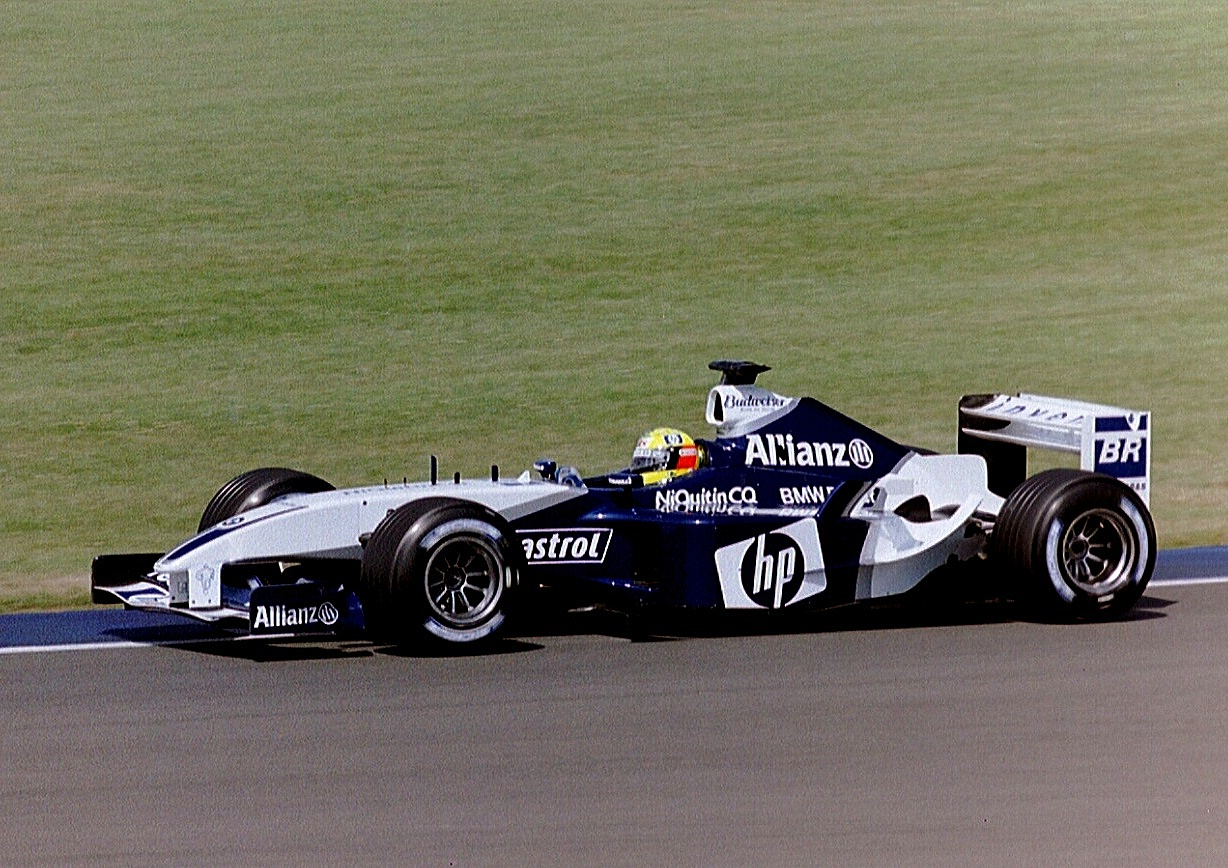
- Ralf Schumacher driving the FW25 at the 2003 British Grand Prix
- Category: Formula One
- Constructor: Williams
- Designers: Patrick Head (Technical Director); Gavin Fisher (Chief Designer); Brian O'Roarke (Chief Composites Engineer); Mark Tatham (Chief Mechanical Engineer); Steve Wise (Head of Electronics); Antonia Terzi (Head of Aerodynamics); Jason Somerville (Principal Aerodynamicist); Nick Alcock (Principal Aerodynamicist); Heinz Paschen (Technical Engine Director - BMW); Angelo Camerini (Chief Designer, Engine - BMW)
- Predecessor: Williams FW24
- Successor: Williams FW26

Technical specifications
- Chassis: Carbon/Epoxy composite monocoque
- Suspension (front): Double wishbone, torsion bar, pushrod
- Suspension (rear): Double wishbone, coil spring, pushrod
- Width: 1,800 mm (71 in)
- Height: 950 mm (37 in)
- Wheelbase: Over 3,000 mm (118 in)
- Engine: BMW P83 2,998 cc (183 cu in) V10 naturally-aspirated Mid-mounted
- Transmission: Williams 6-speed longitudinal semi-automatic sequential
- Power: 940 hp @ 19,200 rpm
- Weight: 600 kg (1,323 lb)
- Fuel: Petrobras
- Lubricants: Castrol
- Tyres: Michelin

Competition history
- Notable entrants: BMW Williams F1 Team
- Notable drivers: 3. (Colombia) Juan Pablo Montoya; 4. (Germany) Ralf Schumacher; 4. (Spain) Marc Gené
- Debut: 2003 Australian Grand Prix
- First win: 2003 Monaco Grand Prix
- Last win: 2003 German Grand Prix
- Last event: 2003 Japanese Grand Prix
Races	Wins	Poles	F/Laps
16	4	4	4
- Constructors' Championships: 0
- Drivers' Championships: 0

The Williams FW25 is a Formula One car designed by Williams and powered by a BMW V10 engine. The car was used by Williams for the 2003 championship. Three drivers would drive the FW25 in the 2003 season, with Marc Gené replacing regular racer Ralf Schumacher for the Italian Grand Prix after the German suffered a large testing accident at Monza's Lesmo 1 corner prior to that race. The other regular driver Juan Pablo Montoya started all of the season's Grand Prix.

As of 2026, it remains the last Williams car to score a 1–2 finish.

== Design ==
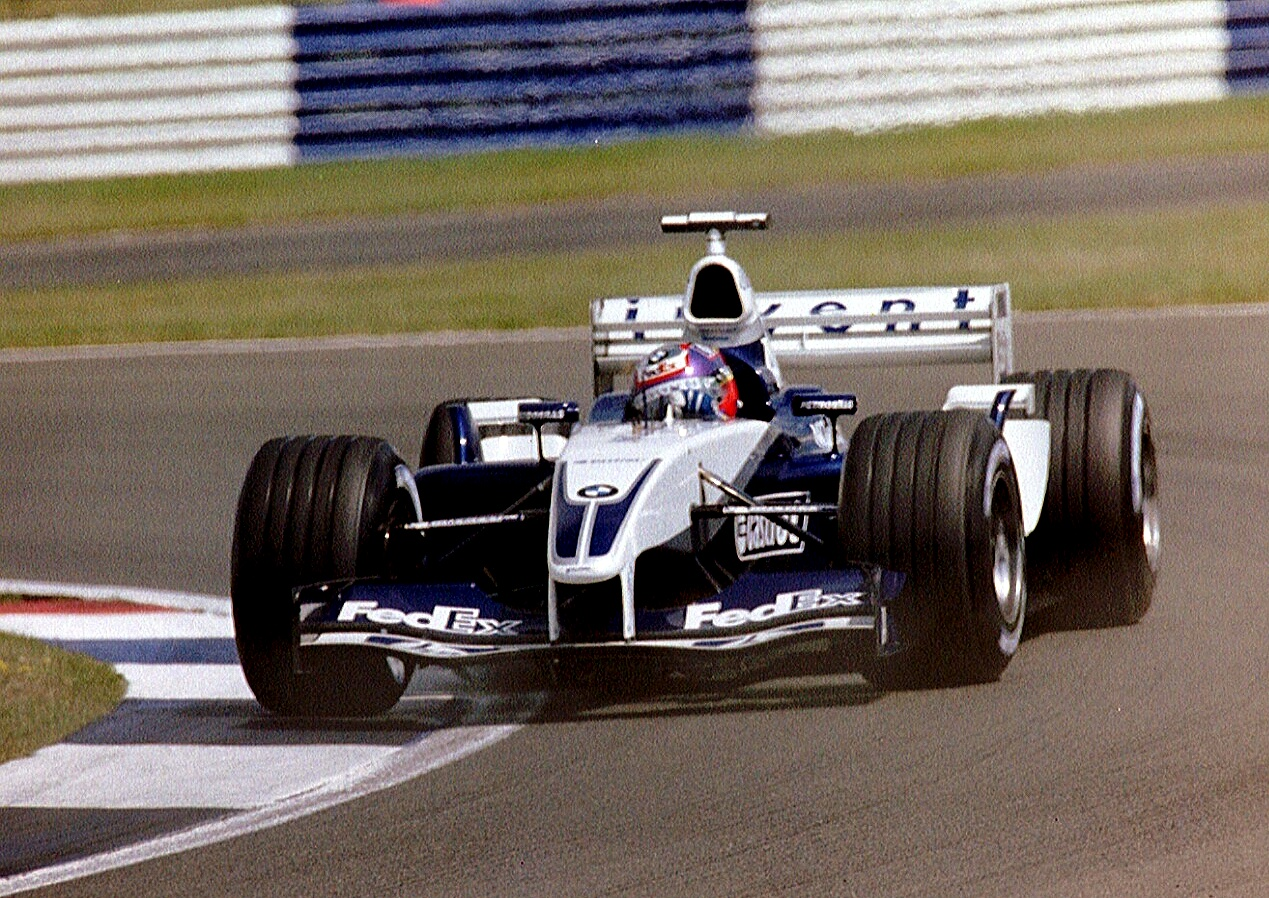
Juan Pablo Montoya driving the FW25 at the 2003 British Grand Prix

The design of the 2003 Williams FW25 was a marked departure over its predecessor, and was a completely new design compared to the Williams FW24, something that Williams had not done between 2001 and 2002. New to the 2003 design team was ex-Ferrari aerodynamicist, Antonia Terzi, who worked with existing designer Gavin Fisher after the departure of ex-chief aerodynamicist, Geoff Willis.

== Season summary ==
Although the FW25 could have easily won on its debut during the Australian Grand Prix but for a costly late race spin from the lead by Colombian driver Juan Pablo Montoya, the car did not establish itself amongst the frontrunners on the grid until the Austrian Grand Prix where again Montoya led before retiring with engine failure. Until that race, both drivers complained about understeer due to flaws in the car's design and were restricted to minor points placings.

A new, wider front tyre introduced by Michelin at the Monaco Grand Prix unlocked the potential of the FW25, with Montoya winning in Monte Carlo before the team scored a double-podium at the Canadian Grand Prix, then went on to score dominant 1–2 victories at the European Grand Prix at the Nürburgring, and the next race, the French Grand Prix at Magny-Cours, with Ralf Schumacher leading home Montoya on both occasions.

This mid-season resurgence in form ignited both the team's and Montoya's own title challenge, with the Columbian extending his podium streak with a second place at the British Grand Prix, winning the German Grand Prix by over a minute from pole position and taking third place at the Hungarian Grand Prix, leaving him just one point behind title rival Michael Schumacher at the top of the Drivers' Championship standings. Meanwhile, after outscoring Ferrari in Hungary, the team led the Constructors' Championship by eight points with only three rounds remaining.

Subsequently, a change to Michelin's front tyre width (resulting from a protest lodged by their rivals Bridgestone through the Ferrari team after their poor performance at the Hungarian Grand Prix) caused controversy through the paddock, with Williams tipped to lose their competitive edge after that race due to a slimmer tyre design being raced at the Italian Grand Prix at Monza being seemingly at odds with the wider tyre that Williams brought with great effect to the Monaco Grand Prix. Despite Montoya taking his eighth consecutive podium with second place at Monza, being able to stay with eventual World Champion Michael Schumacher's Ferrari throughout the whole race, the FW25 would not win again in the final three races of the season, with the Italian, United States, and Japanese GP taking place after the tyre redesign.

Montoya's title hopes were eventually extinguished after the penultimate race in the United States at Indianapolis, although Williams still entered the final round in Japan with a chance at taking their tenth Constructors' title. This initially looked promising as Montoya led the final race at Suzuka before retiring with a hydraulics problem. Montoya would later cite the FW25 as a favourite of his, praising the balance and the driveability with the powerful BMW engine which suited his aggressive driving style.

== Sponsorship and livery ==
The livery of the FW25 remained similar to its two predecessors with blue and white remaining as the primary colours and silver used as an accent colour while most of the previous seasons sponsors were retained. New sponsors for 2003 included Hewlett-Packard, who bought Compaq. Brewery brand Budweiser began sponsoring the British Grand Prix onwards. At the German Grand Prix, the "Budweiser" logo was simplified as "Bud" due to the licensing issues from its parent company, Anheuser-Busch. At the Hungarian Grand Prix, the "Budweiser" logo was simplified as "American Bud" to avoid any confusion with the Czech beer of the same name.

== In popular culture ==
On 18 June 2018, it was announced by Codemasters that this car would appear as a classic car in F1 2018.

== Complete Formula One results ==
(key) (results in bold indicate pole position, results in italics indicate fastest lap)

Year	Chassis	Engine	Tyres	Drivers	1	2	3	4	5	6	7	8	9	10	11	12	13	14	15	16	Points	WCC
2003	FW25	BMW P83 3.0 V10	**MI**		AUS	MAL	BRA	SMR	ESP	AUT	MON	CAN	EUR	FRA	GBR	GER	HUN	ITA	USA	JPN	**144**	**2nd**
2003	FW25	BMW P83 3.0 V10	**MI**	(Colombia) Juan Pablo Montoya	2	11	Ret	7	4	Ret	1	3	2	2	2	**1**	3	2	6	Ret	**144**	**2nd**
2003	FW25	BMW P83 3.0 V10	**MI**	(Germany) Ralf Schumacher	8	4	7	4	5	6	**4**	**2**	1	**1**	9	Ret	4		Ret	12	**144**	**2nd**
2003	FW25	BMW P83 3.0 V10	**MI**	(Spain) Marc Gené														5			**144**	**2nd**

== Sponsors ==
Brand	Country	Placed on
HP	United States	Front wing, nose, rear wing
Compaq	United States	Sidepods
Castrol	United Kingdom	Nose, nosecone
Petrobras	Brazil	Mirrors, rear wing end plate
Reuters	United Kingdom	Sidepods
Allianz	Germany	Front wing end plate, fin
BMW	Germany	Nosecone, fin
FedEx	United States	Front wing
NiQuitinCQ	United Kingdom	Nose, side
Budweiser	United States	Fin
