= Williams FW26 =

Formula One race car

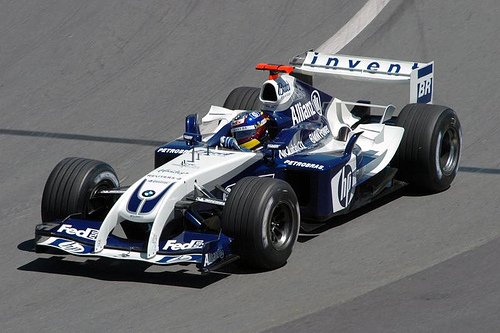
- Juan Pablo Montoya driving the FW26 at the 2004 Canadian Grand Prix
- Category: Formula One
- Constructor: Williams
- Designers: Patrick Head (Technical Director); Gavin Fisher (Chief Designer); Brian O'Roarke (Chief Composites Engineer); Mark Tatham (Chief Mechanical Engineer); Steve Wise (Head of Electronics); Antonia Terzi (Chief Aerodynamicist); Heinz Paschen (Technical Engine Director - BMW); Angelo Camerini (Chief Designer, Engine - BMW)
- Predecessor: Williams FW25
- Successor: Williams FW27

Technical specifications
- Chassis: Carbon aramid epoxy composite monocoque
- Suspension (front): Double wishbone, torsion bar, pushrod
- Suspension (rear): Double wishbone, coil spring, pushrod
- Length: Over 4,600 mm (181 in)
- Width: 1,800 mm (71 in)
- Height: 950 mm (37 in)
- Engine: BMW P84 2,998 cc (183 cu in) V10 electronic indirect multi-point injection with 4-stroke piston Otto-cycle naturally-aspirated, mid-mounted
- Transmission: Williams 6/7-speed + 1 reverse sequential semi-automatic paddle shift with limited-slip differential
- Power: > 950 hp (708 kW) @ 19,000 rpm, 410 N⋅m (302 ft⋅lb) torque
- Weight: 605 kg (1,334 lb) including driver and fuel
- Fuel: Petrobras Podium unleaded 95 RON racing gasoline
- Lubricants: Castrol
- Brakes: Carbon Industrie carbon discs and pads operated by AP calipers
- Tyres: Michelin Pilot slick dry and treaded intermediate and wet
- Clutch: AP Racing multi-plate carbon clutch

Competition history
- Notable entrants: BMW Williams F1 Team
- Notable drivers: 3. (Colombia) Juan Pablo Montoya; 4. (Germany) Ralf Schumacher; 4. (Spain) Marc Gené; 4. (Brazil) Antônio Pizzonia
- Debut: 2004 Australian Grand Prix
- First win: 2004 Brazilian Grand Prix
- Last win: 2004 Brazilian Grand Prix
- Last event: 2004 Brazilian Grand Prix
Races	Wins	Poles	F/Laps
18	1	1	2
- Constructors' Championships: 0
- Drivers' Championships: 0

The Williams FW26 is a Formula One racing car designed and built by Williams Grand Prix Engineering for the 2004 Formula One season. Known for its distinctive "walrus nose" in early iterations, the car was driven by Ralf Schumacher, Juan Pablo Montoya, Antônio Pizzonia and Marc Gené. It was also the last Williams designed under Patrick Head's supervision.

== Design ==
Patrick Head supervised the FW26's development with the aim of being on the pace immediately, whilst his design team, which also contained Gavin Fisher and Antonia Terzi among others, came up with a revolutionary aerodynamics package. The car's "walrus nose" featured a short, stubby nose cone connected to the front wing by sloping vertical spars which allowed more airflow to the underside. To further maximise said airflow, the car also featured a twin-keel front suspension, pioneered by Sauber and also used by McLaren and Jordan.

Launch control and fully-automatic gearboxes, which had been used by the team for the previous three seasons since the 2001 Spanish Grand Prix, had also been banned for 2004.

== Season summary ==
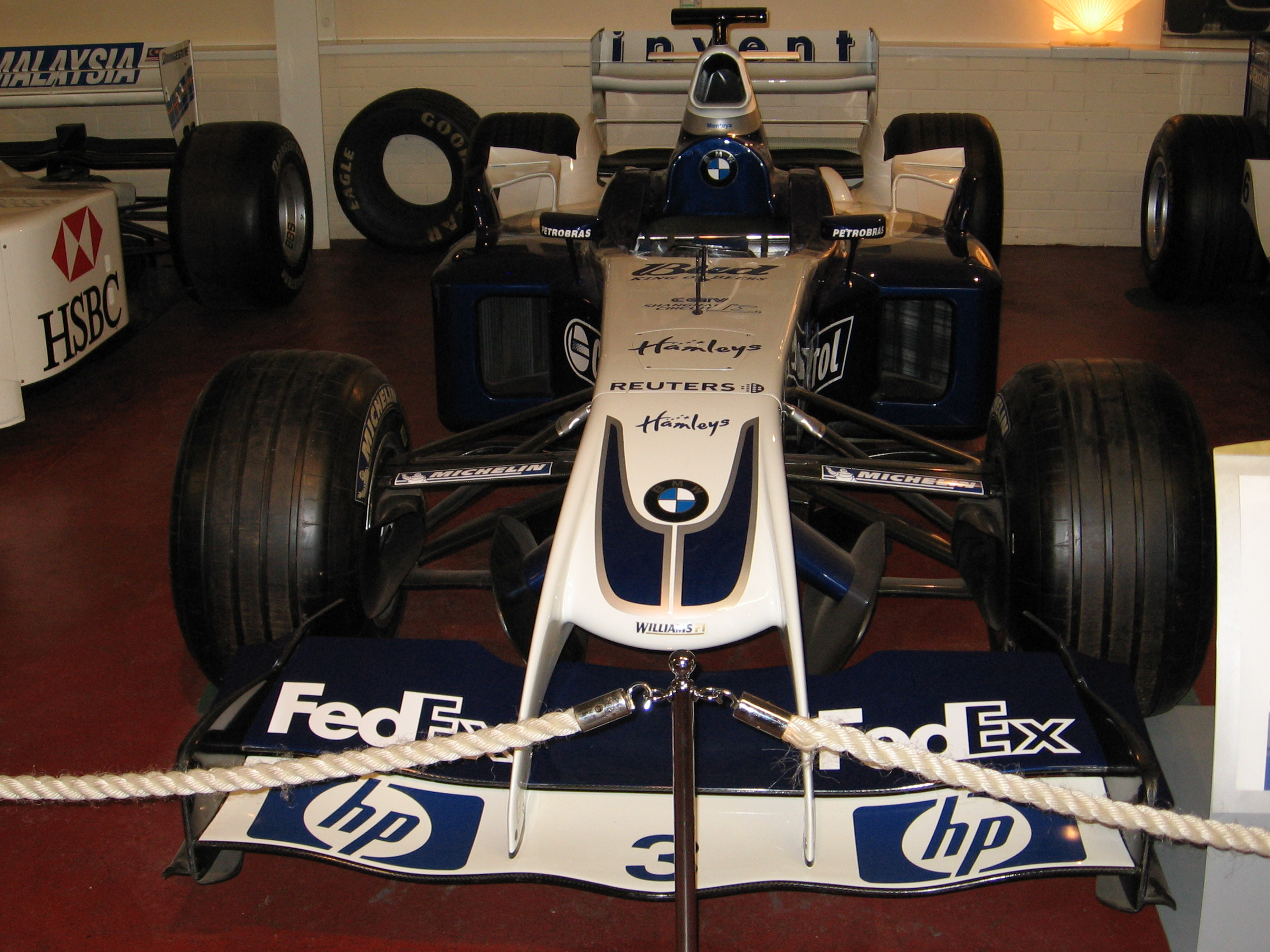
Juan Pablo Montoya's FW26 in the Donington Grand Prix Collection

The FW26 proved fast in pre-season testing and Montoya was tipped as a title favourite, but during the season proper the car proved difficult to set up and was inconsistent, with Montoya and Schumacher both struggling to maximise the car's potential. The car was genuinely outpaced by the Renaults and BARs of that time, as well as the Byrne/Brawn-designed Ferrari F2004, which dominated much of the season. This meant the team was largely in the upper midpack among the competition this year, but not in contention for the title.

Mid-season was especially barren. Both cars were disqualified from second and fifth-place finishes in Canada for running brakes that infringed the technical regulations, and Schumacher suffered a heavy crash at Indianapolis, sidelining him for three months, while Montoya was disqualified for the second race in a row for illegal use of a spare car after his car failed to start prior to the formation lap. Schumacher's replacements, Marc Gené and Antônio Pizzonia, could do little with the car and it was left to Montoya to defend Williams's honour.

The team redesigned the front end of the car in time for the Hungarian Grand Prix and fitted the car with a more conventional nosecone. It was with this configuration that Montoya set the then-all-time fastest F1 lap in pre-qualifying at Monza, almost 163 mph average. This does not stand as a lap record as it was not set during the race. He rounded off the season with a win in Brazil, whilst the returning Schumacher put in strong drives in Japan and China. Following Montoya's win in Brazil, Williams would not score another win until eight years later when fellow South American Pastor Maldonado won the 2012 Spanish Grand Prix in his FW34.

== Sponsorship and livery ==
The FW26 is predominantly painted in white and blue. Allianz, BR, Budweiser, Castrol, FedEx, Hewlett-Packard, and Reuters advertise on the vehicle.

At the European and German Grands Prix, the "Budweiser" logo was simplified as "Bud" due to the licensing issues from its parent company, Anheuser-Busch. At the French Grand Prix, the Budweiser logo was completely removed.

== Complete Formula One results ==
(key) (results in bold indicate pole position)

Year	Team	Engine	Tyres	Drivers	1	2	3	4	5	6	7	8	9	10	11	12	13	14	15	16	17	18	Points	WCC
2004	Williams	BMW P84 V10	**M**		AUS	MAL	BHR	SMR	ESP	MON	EUR	CAN	USA	FRA	GBR	GER	HUN	BEL	ITA	CHN	JPN	BRA	88	4th
2004	Williams	BMW P84 V10	**M**	(Colombia) Juan Pablo Montoya	5	2	13	3	Ret	4	8	DSQ	DSQ	8	5	5	4	Ret	5	5	7	1	88	4th
2004	Williams	BMW P84 V10	**M**	(Germany) Ralf Schumacher	4	Ret	7	7	6	10	Ret	**DSQ**	Ret							Ret	2	5	88	4th
2004	Williams	BMW P84 V10	**M**	(Spain) Marc Gené										10	12								88	4th
2004	Williams	BMW P84 V10	**M**	(Brazil) Antônio Pizzonia												7	7	Ret	7				88	4th

== Sponsors ==
Brand	Country	Placed on
HP	United States	Front wing, nose, rear wing, sidepods
Castrol	United Kingdom	Nosecone
Petrobras	Brazil	Mirrors, rear wing end plate
Reuters	United Kingdom	Sidepods, nose
Allianz	Germany	Front wing end plate, fin
BMW	Germany	Nosecone, fin
FedEx	United States	Front wing
NiQuitinCQ	United Kingdom	Cockpit side
Budweiser	United States	Fin, nose
CCTV	China	Nose
Hamleys	United Kingdom	Nose

== Gallery ==
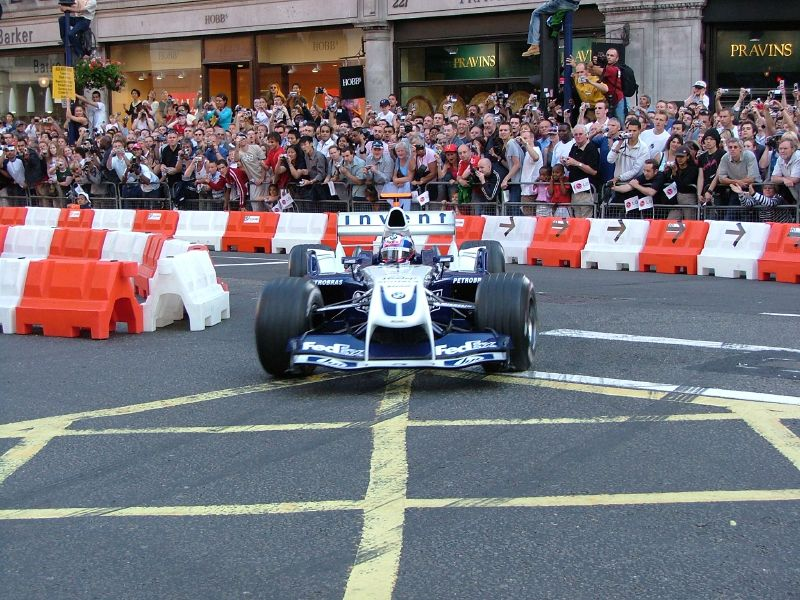
Montoya demonstrating the FW26 at Regent Street, London on 6 July 2004

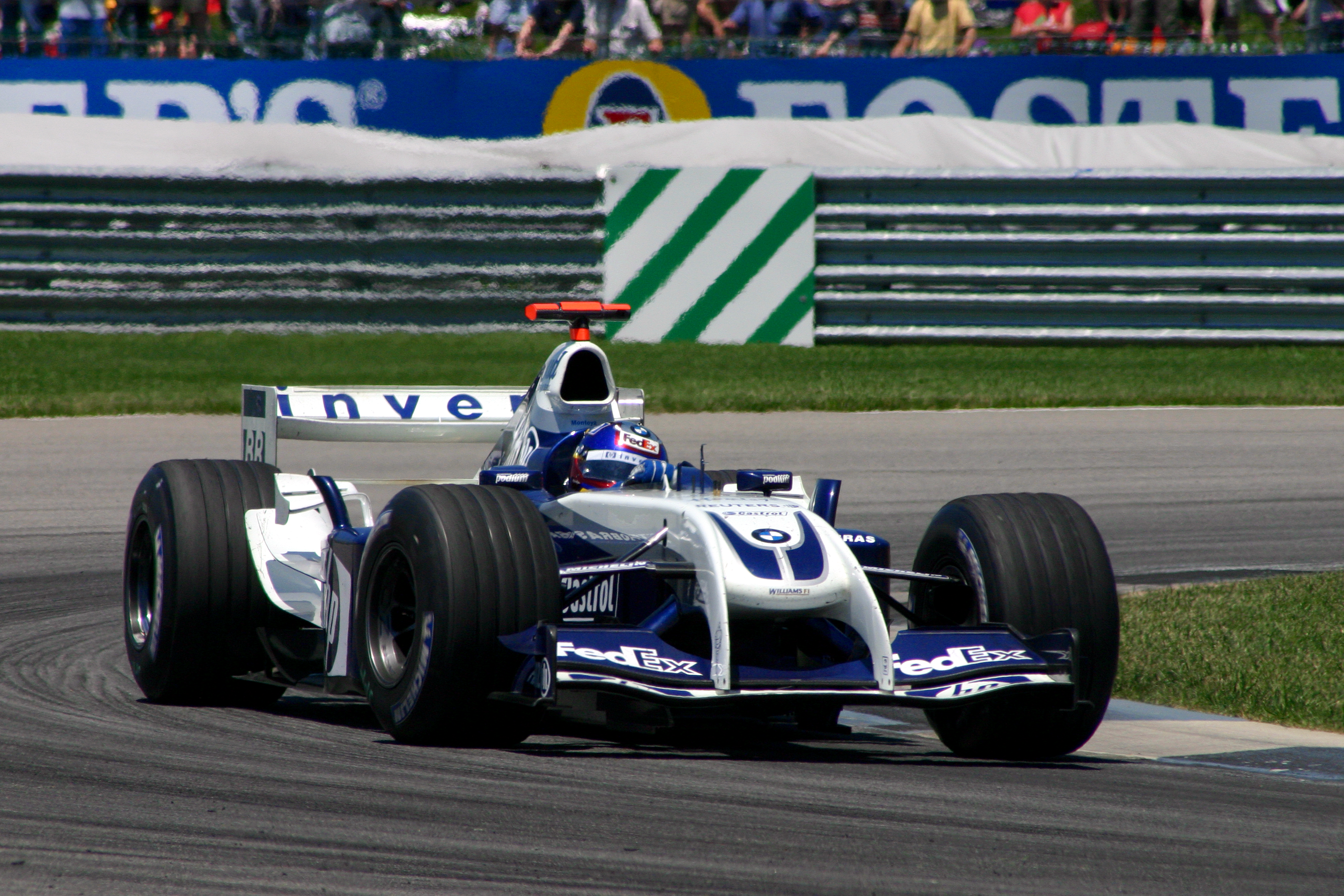
Montoya during the 2004 United States Grand Prix

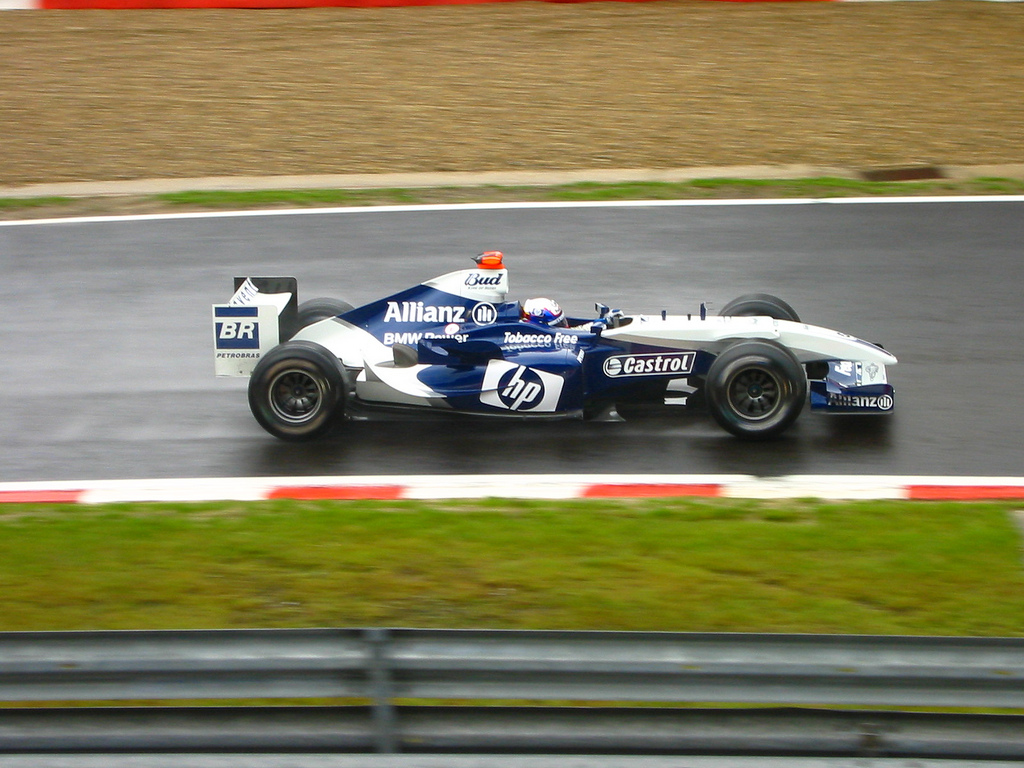
Montoya qualifying for the 2004 Belgian Grand Prix with the redesigned FW26

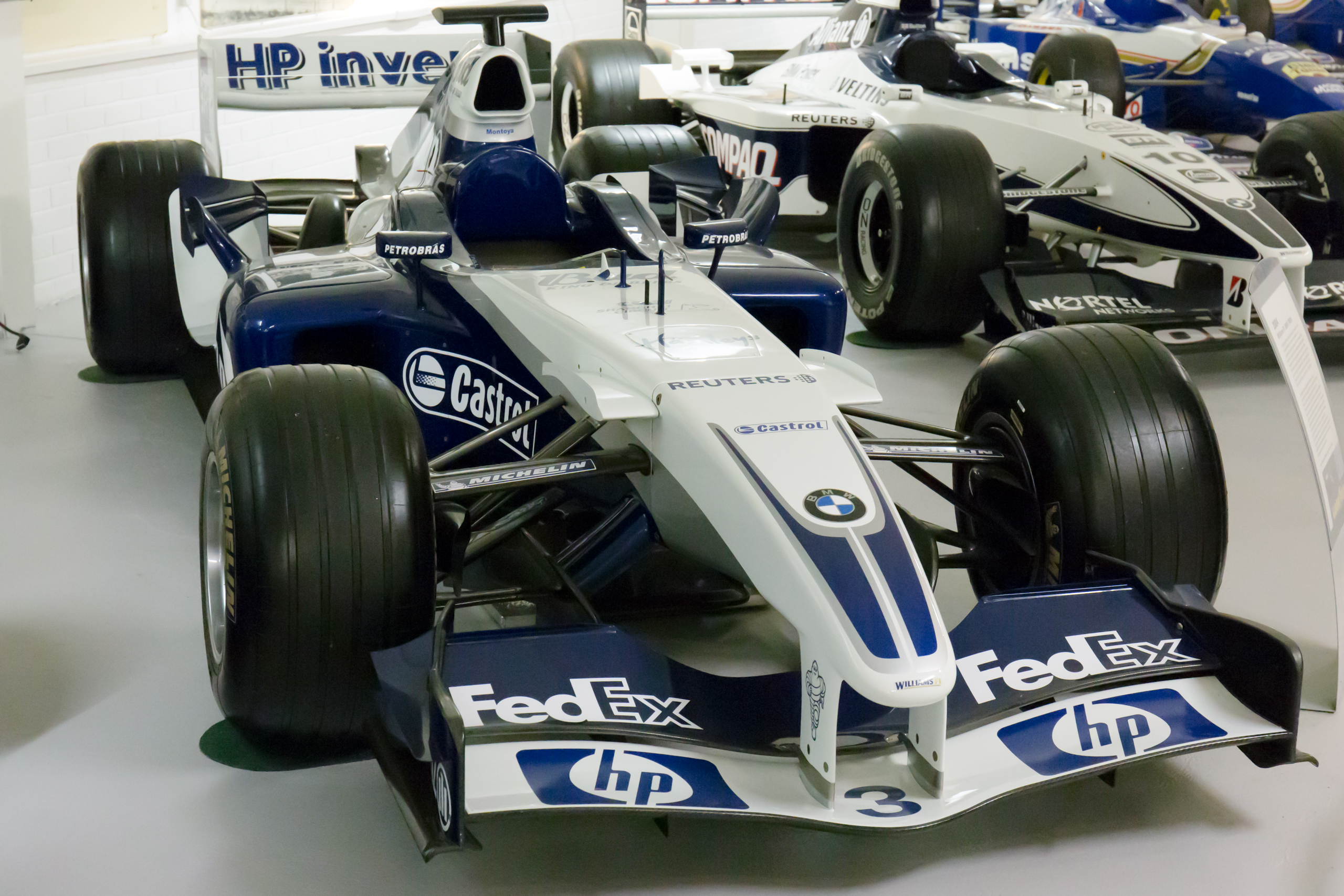
An FW26 with the improved front section in the Donington Grand Prix Collection
