= Williams FW23 =

Formula One racing car

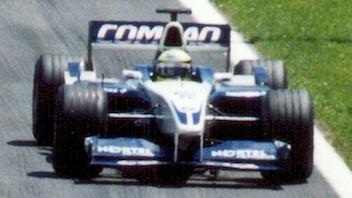
- Ralf Schumacher driving the FW23 at the 2001 Canadian Grand Prix
- Category: Formula One
- Constructor: Williams
- Designers: Patrick Head (Technical Director); Gavin Fisher (Chief Designer); Brian O'Roake (Chief Composites Engineer); Mark Tatham (Chief Mechanical Engineer); Steve Wise (Head of Electronics); Geoff Willis (Head of Aerodynamics); Jason Somerville (Senior Aerodynamicist); Werner Laurenz (Technical Engine Director - BMW); Heinz Paschen (Chief Designer, Engine - BMW)
- Predecessor: Williams FW22
- Successor: Williams FW24

Technical specifications
- Chassis: Carbon-fibre monocoque
- Suspension (front): Williams double wishbone, torsion bar, pushrod
- Suspension (rear): Williams double wishbone, coil spring, pushrod
- Engine: BMW P80 2,998 cc (182.9 cu in) V10 (90°) naturally aspirated, 19,000 RPM mid-engined
- Transmission: Williams 7-speed longitudinal semi-automatic sequential
- Power: 880 hp (656 kW) @ 18,000 RPM
- Fuel: Petrobras
- Lubricants: Castrol
- Tyres: Michelin

Competition history
- Notable entrants: BMW Williams F1 Team
- Notable drivers: 5. (Germany) Ralf Schumacher; 6. (Colombia) Juan Pablo Montoya
- Debut: 2001 Australian Grand Prix
- First win: 2001 San Marino Grand Prix
- Last win: 2001 Italian Grand Prix
- Last event: 2001 Japanese Grand Prix
| Races | Wins | Podiums | Poles | F/Laps |
|---|---|---|---|---|
| 17 | 4 | 9 | 4 | 8 |
- Constructors' Championships: 0
- Drivers' Championships: 0

The Williams FW23 was the car with which the Williams team competed in the 2001 Formula One World Championship. It was driven by German Ralf Schumacher, who was in his third year with the team, and Colombian Juan Pablo Montoya, a previous Formula 3000 and CART champion who was making his F1 début.

This was the first Williams car supplied with Michelin tyres since the FW07 in 1981.

== Overview ==
=== Car and season ===
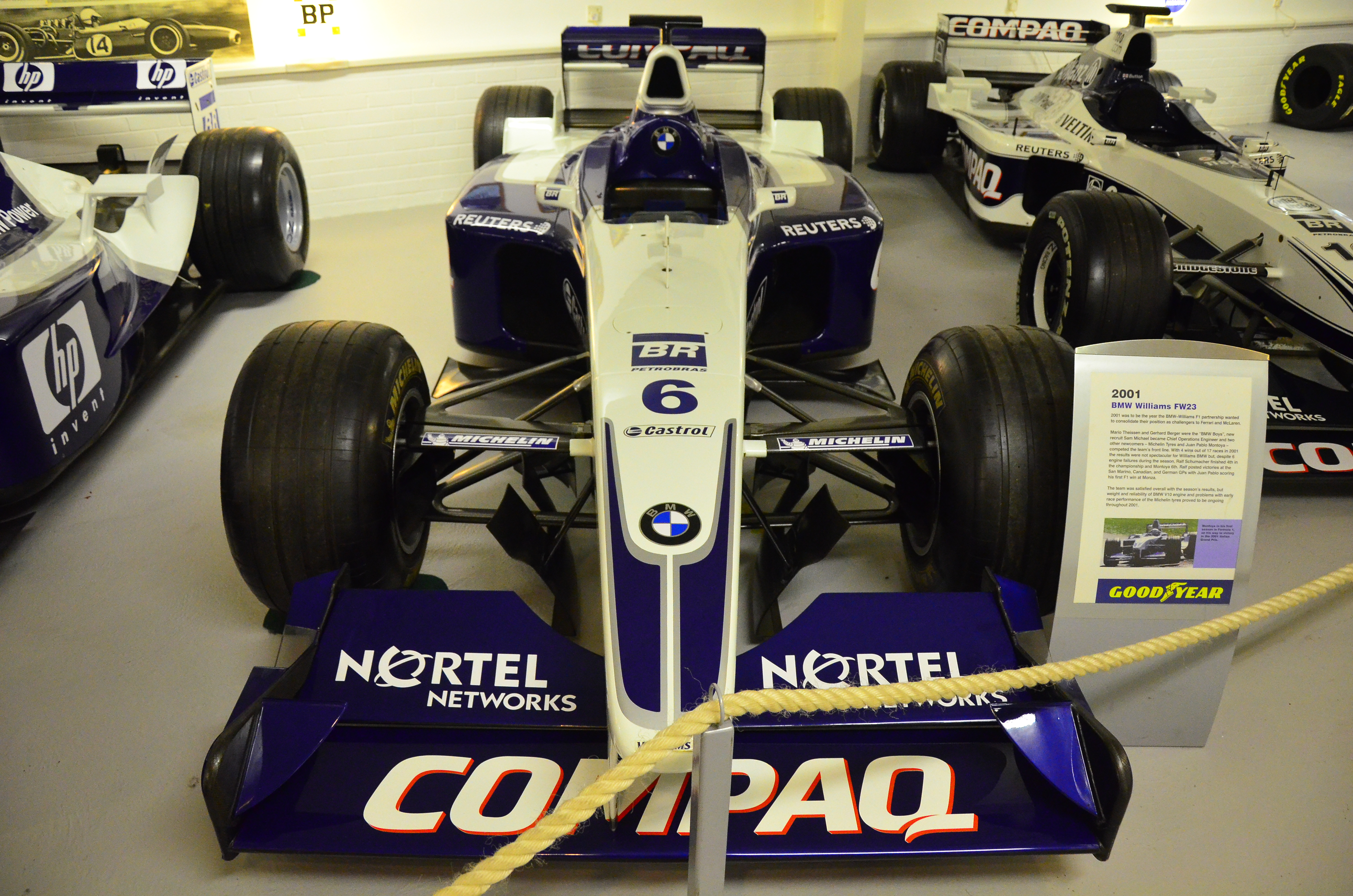
Montoya's FW23 on display at the Donington Grand Prix Collection

2001 was Williams' second year with engine partners BMW and the promise shown in 2000 translated into raw speed and some good results throughout the year, including the team's first win since 1997, at Imola. The powerful engine, well-designed chassis, the Michelin tyres' tendency to work well in hot conditions and the efforts of two quick drivers resulted in a haul of four victories and the team's re-emergence at the top of the sport, alongside Ferrari and McLaren. The car was especially strong on faster circuits such as Hockenheim and Monza, where the BMW engine put Williams at a distinct advantage over their rivals.

However, Williams was not able to mount a title challenge, for several reasons. Firstly, the BMW engines were more unreliable than their rivals, resulting in a finishing rate of less than 50%. Secondly, in contrast to the faster circuits, the chassis was not as competitive on high-downforce tracks such as Monaco and the Hungaroring. Thirdly, both drivers made several mistakes, Montoya in particular as he came to terms with F1.

However, the team still finished a clear third in the Constructors' Championship, with 80 points.

A total of nine chassis were built.

== Sponsorship and livery ==
BMW Williams went into the 2001 season with renewed major sponsorships such as Allianz, Nortel Networks, Compaq, Reuters, Veltins, Petrobras and Castrol. The team received new sponsorship from WorldCom while 11880.com was discontinued. The livery was similar to the 2000 design with subtle changes.

In France, Veltins was replaced with "Visions" due to alcohol branding being outlawed.

In free practice ahead of the San Marino Grand Prix, Williams jokingly painted their rear wing with a text saying "Keep Your Distance!" after several rear-end shunts in the opening races, most notably by Jos Verstappen on Montoya whilst leading in Brazil.

At the United States Grand Prix, Schumacher's helmet featured an American flag in response to the September 11 attacks.

== Gallery ==
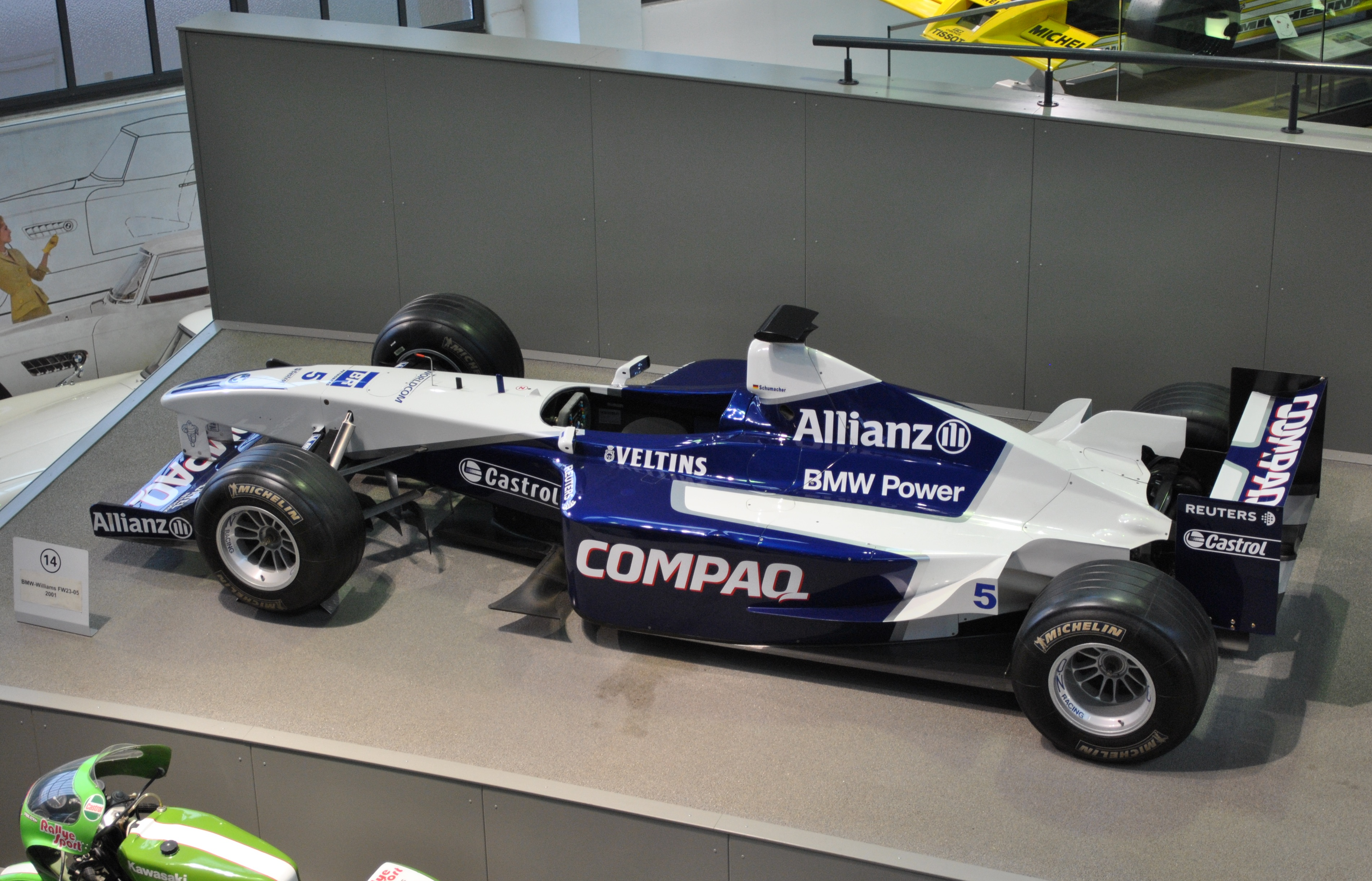
FW23-05, 2001

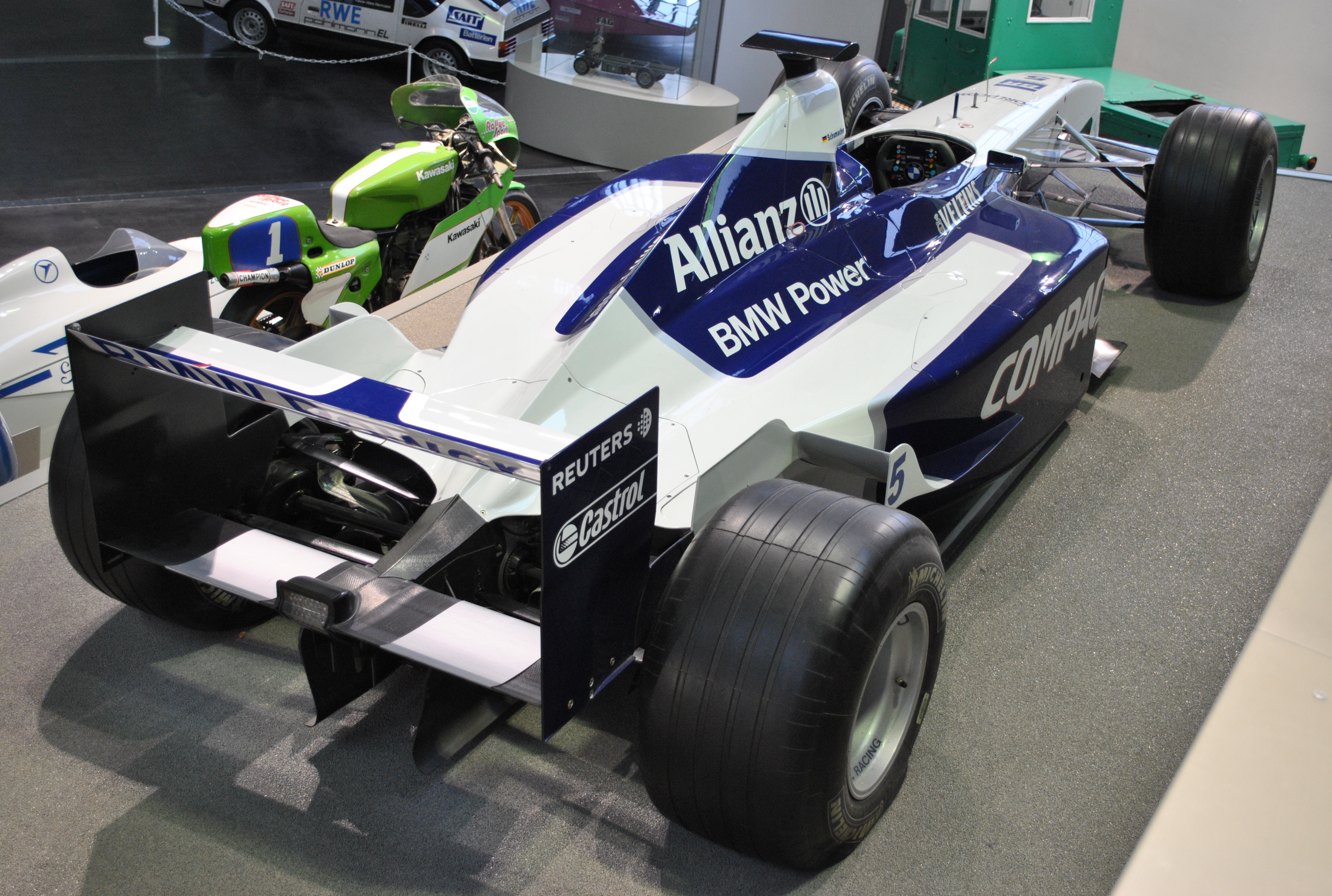
FW23-05, rear view

== Complete Formula One results ==
(key) (results in bold indicate pole position)

| Year | Team | Engine | Tyres | Drivers | 1 | 2 | 3 | 4 | 5 | 6 | 7 | 8 | 9 | 10 | 11 | 12 | 13 | 14 | 15 | 16 | 17 | Points | WCC |
|---|---|---|---|---|---|---|---|---|---|---|---|---|---|---|---|---|---|---|---|---|---|---|---|
| 2001 | Williams | BMW V10 | **MI** | | AUS | MAL | BRA | SMR | ESP | AUT | MON | CAN | EUR | FRA | GBR | GER | HUN | BEL | ITA | USA | JPN | **80** | **3rd** |
| 2001 | Williams | BMW V10 | **MI** | (Germany) Ralf Schumacher | Ret | 5 | Ret | 1 | Ret | Ret | Ret | 1 | 4 | **2** | Ret | 1 | 4 | 7 | 3 | Ret | 6 | **80** | **3rd** |
| 2001 | Williams | BMW V10 | **MI** | (Colombia) Juan Pablo Montoya | Ret | Ret | Ret | Ret | 2 | Ret | Ret | Ret | 2 | Ret | 4 | **Ret** | 8 | **Ret** | **1** | Ret | 2 | **80** | **3rd** |

== Sponsors ==
| Brand | Country | Placed on |
|---|---|---|
| Compaq | United States | Rear wing, sidepods, front wing |
| Castrol | United Kingdom | Rear wing end plate, nose, nosecone |
| Veltins | Germany | Side |
| Nortel | Canada | Front wing |
| Petrobras | Brazil | Nose, mirrors |
| Reuters | United Kingdom | Sidepods, rear wing end plate |
| Allianz | Germany | Front wing end plate, fin |
| BMW | Germany | Nosecone, fin |
| WorldCom | United States | Nose |
