= 2003 Australian Grand Prix =

Coordinates: 37°50′59″S 144°58′06″E

Race 1 of 16 in the 2003 Formula One World Championship
← Previous race	Next race →

Race details
- Date: 9 March 2003
- Official name: 2003 Foster's Australian Grand Prix
- Location: Albert Park Circuit, Albert Park, Melbourne, Victoria, Australia
- Course: Temporary street circuit
- Course length: 5.303 km (3.295 miles)
- Distance: 58 laps, 307.574 km (191.118 miles)
- Weather: Damp at beginning, dry later, cloudy, mild
- Attendance: 118,000

Pole position
Driver	(Germany) Michael Schumacher	Ferrari
- Time: 1:27.173

Fastest lap
Driver	(Finland) Kimi Räikkönen	McLaren-Mercedes
- Time: 1:27.724 on lap 32

Podium
First	(United Kingdom) David Coulthard	McLaren-Mercedes
Second	(Colombia) Juan Pablo Montoya	Williams-BMW
Third	(Finland) Kimi Räikkönen	McLaren-Mercedes

The 2003 Australian Grand Prix (formally the 2003 Foster's Australian Grand Prix) was a Formula One motor race held at the Albert Park Circuit, Albert Park, Melbourne, Victoria, Australia on 9 March 2003. It was the first round of the 2003 Formula One World Championship and the eighth World Championship Australian Grand Prix at Albert Park. McLaren's David Coulthard won the 58-lap race after starting in 11th position. Williams driver Juan Pablo Montoya finished in second and Coulthard's teammate Kimi Räikkönen took third.

Ferrari's Michael Schumacher, the World Drivers' Champion, took pole position after setting the quickest lap time in the second qualifying session.The circuit was damp after an overnight rainstorm but quickly dried due to a strong wind. Schumacher led the race for six laps until a pit stop on lap seven to switch from wet to dry tyres. The lead changed seven times between four different drivers. Montoya led after the second round of pit stops, but lost first place and the race victory to Coulthard when he lost control of his car on lap 48. The safety car was deployed twice during the race, including an accident involving Ferrari driver Rubens Barrichello on lap six.

The victory was the 13th and last of Coulthard's Formula One career and it meant he left Australia as the World Drivers' Championship leader with ten championship points. Montoya was two championship points behind in second, and Räikkönen was another two points back in third. McLaren led the World Constructors' Championship with 16 championship points while Williams were second with nine championship points with 15 races remaining in the season.

== Background ==
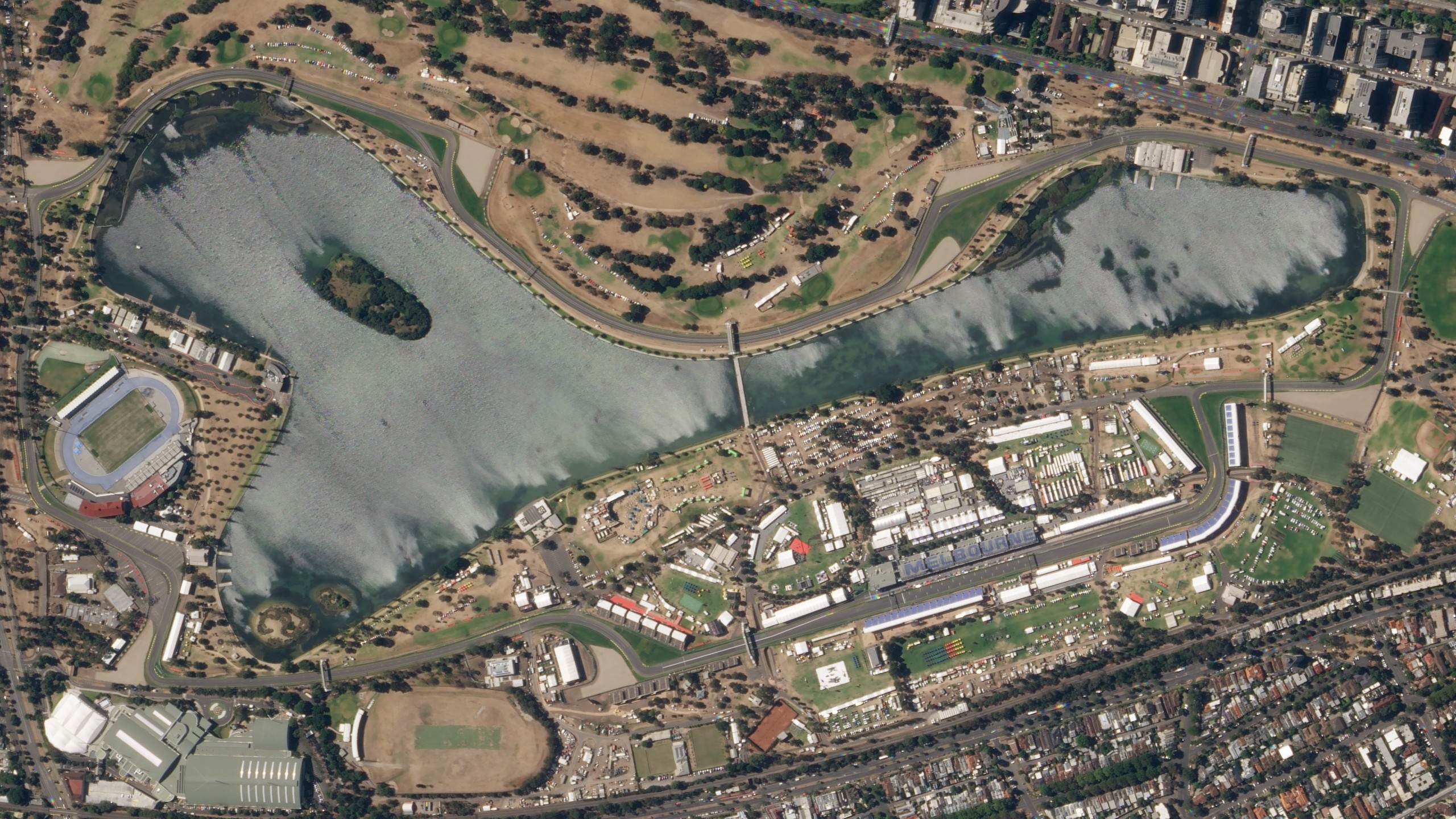
The Albert Park Circuit (pictured in 2018), where the Grand Prix was held.

The 2003 Australian Grand Prix took place at the 5.303 km (3.295 mi) Albert Park Circuit in Albert Park, Melbourne, Victoria on 9 March 2003; it was the first round of sixteen in the 2003 Formula One World Championship and the eighth staging of the World Championship Australian Grand Prix at Albert Park. The Carrera Cup, the Cleanevent Nations Cup, the Formula Ford Track Attack, the REV GT Kart Challenge and V8 Supercars held support races during the weekend. The track's mesh barriers were raised from 2.5 m (8.2 ft) to 4.75 m (15.6 ft) after marshal Graham Beveridge's death in an accident during the 2001 race.

Out of the 10 teams and 20 drivers on the starting grid, four drivers made their debut. The 2002 CART FedEx Championship Series champion Cristiano da Matta joined the Toyota team alongside Olivier Panis. The two replaced Toyota's 2002 lineup of Allan McNish, who moved to Renault as third driver and Mika Salo, who left Formula One. At the Minardi team, 2001 International Formula 3000 champion Justin Wilson joined Jos Verstappen, who rejoined the series after a one-year absence. The third rookie driver in the 2003 driver lineup was Antônio Pizzonia, who joined Jaguar to partner former Minardi racer Mark Webber; both replaced Eddie Irvine and Pedro de la Rosa. The last rookie competitor was Formula Nippon driver Ralph Firman, who replaced Takuma Sato at Jordan.

At the front of the field, many were tipping Ferrari driver and five-time world champion Michael Schumacher as the favourite to win the 2003 World Drivers' Championship. Bookmakers in Australia and the United Kingdom installed Michael Schumacher as the favourite to win the Australian Grand Prix for the fourth consecutive time. He said he was expecting other teams to perform better than the season before, "It will automatically become harder because other teams hadn't done a great job last year, and I am pretty sure they will do a much better job this year and therefore competition will become harder." Nigel Mansell, the 1992 world champion, said Schumacher's high level of talent combined with his strong desire to succeed, would make him quite difficult to beat.

The Fédération Internationale de l'Automobile (FIA; Formula One's governing body) president Max Mosley with Formula One head Bernie Ecclestone's support imposed sporting regulation changes in an attempt to reduce costs in Formula One, make the series more competitive, and stem the decline in television viewing figures. The championship points system was expanded to include the first eight finishers to try and keep the title battle open for as long as possible and to reward consistency. For the first time since 1995, qualifying was separated into two one-hour sessions, conducted on Fridays and Saturdays, with cars running one at a time for one quick lap. Drivers had to start the race with their second qualifying session fuel loads and tyres. The Sunday morning warm-up session for teams to fine-tune their vehicle settings was ended and cars were placed under parc fermé conditions, preventing significant changes to cars or refuelling between Saturday qualifying and the race. On Friday morning, a two-hour test session was held for teams that agreed to limit their in-season testing programmes, and team orders that affected race results were prohibited. Spare cars could only be used if Formula One technical delegate Charlie Whiting was convinced a damaged chassis was irreparable in parc fermé; drivers who did use spare cars would be required to start the race from the pit lane.

Both Ferrari and McLaren delayed the debut of their new car, with Ferrari introducing a redesigned version called the F2002B and McLaren introducing the drastically altered MP4-17D, which included a completely new rear end and several aerodynamic changes to both the front and rear. Among these was the adoption of revised rear wing profiles that were no longer rectangular but rounded at the ends, a solution introduced by Renault in the 2002 season to limit vortice formation, which was copied by British American Racing (BAR), Williams and Jaguar. The new Williams FW25 differed significantly from the car used in winter testing. The gearbox and rear suspension used in testing on the hybrid variants of the FW24 car were installed, while the solution planned for the FW25 was temporarily discarded. Renault used Friday morning's private test session to evaluate various methods for cooling the R23 car's body and aerodynamics, eventually choosing for a solution that included a chimney on the car's right side, where the oil radiator was.

== Private test session ==
The first two-hour private test session was held on Friday morning in sunny weather. Although the track surface gave minimal grip for cars, there were small offs into the grass but no one spun. Nine drivers participated in the session. Renault driver Jarno Trulli was fastest with a lap time of 1:28.125, ahead of Webber and Jordan's Giancarlo Fisichella; all three drivers were within one-tenth of a second of each other.

== Practice and warm-up sessions ==
There were three practice sessions preceding Sunday's race: one 60-minute session on Friday and two 45-minute sessions on Saturday. The first practice session was held on Friday morning in dry and hot weather. McLaren's Kimi Räikkönen set the fastest lap of 1:26.509 with five minutes remaining, 0.479 seconds ahead of teammate David Coulthard. Trulli, Ferrari's Rubens Barrichello, Webber, Michael Schumacher, Renault's Fernando Alonso, Sauber's Nick Heidfeld, and the Williams duo of Juan Pablo Montoya and Ralf Schumacher followed in the top ten. Several drivers went off the track during the session. The engine in Jacques Villeneuve's BAR car failed 11 minutes in and he pulled off with fire licking the cockpit. His teammate Jenson Button also had an engine failure while Fisichella's fuel pump failed.

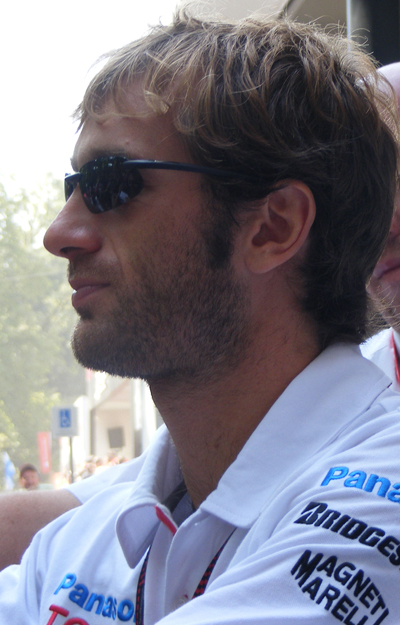
Jarno Trulli (pictured in 2007) set the pace in the Saturday morning practice sessions.

The second practice session was held on Saturday morning. The track was slick and dirty from overnight rainstorms, but it dried quickly. Button lapped fastest at 1:27.415 towards the conclusion of the session, going almost two-tenths of a second faster than second-placed Barrichello. Ralf Schumacher, Michael Schumacher, Trulli, Coulthard, Montoya, Alonso, Webber and Villeneuve rounded out the top ten. Montoya's oil valve malfunctioned, leaking oil into the airbox and emitting smoke. His engine was not replaced because it was undamaged. Michael Schumacher lost control of his Ferrari in Ascari corner, removing the nose cone and left-front wheel against the barrier. Pizzonia experienced a braking issue and spun backwards at turn three near the sports centre. He returned to the garage and exited his car unhurt. With ten minutes left, Räikkönen lost control of his McLaren at the fast right-hand Whiteford corner, severely damaging the car's left-front corner. Räikkönen was unhurt, but officials stopped practice for nine minutes as marshals secured his damaged car on the grass verge. Villeneuve stopped at the end of the session with an hydraulic system mechanical issue.

The final practice session was held later that morning in cool, cloudy weather, with the majority of teams experimenting with fuel loads and car settings in preparation for the second qualifying session that afternoon. Räikkönen sat out the session as McLaren were working on his car, while Michael Schumacher's Ferrari was repaired. Trulli was fastest with a 1:26.928 lap set with five minutes remaining. Button's fastest time remained unchanged, dropping to second. Alonso, the Ferrari duo of Michael Schumacher and Barrichello, the Williams pair of Montoya and Ralf Schumacher, Heidfeld, Couthard and Da Matta completed the top ten. Coulthard had a right-rear puncture and returned slowly to the pit lane before experiencing a fuel pump failure upon entry. A 15-minute warm-up session saw Barrichello lap fastest at 1:27.738, followed by teammate Michael Schumacher, the Renaults of Alonso and Trulli, Coulthard, Villeneuve, Ralf Schumacher, Räikkönen, Button and Panis.

== Qualifying ==
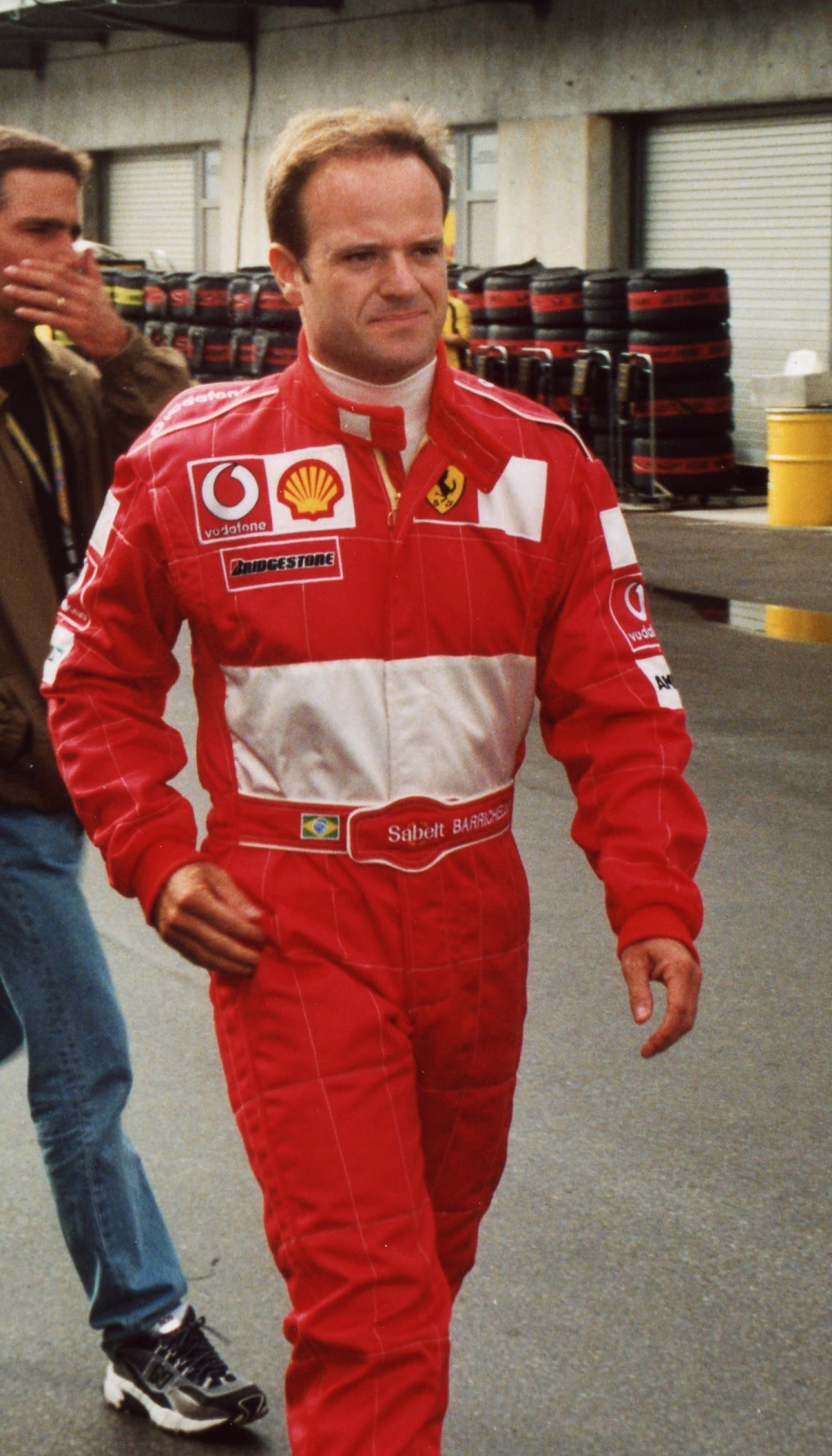
Rubens Barrichello (pictured in 2002) was the fastest driver in the first qualifying session

There were two one-hour qualifying sessions on both Friday and Saturday afternoons. The final 2002 World Drivers' Championship standings determined the running order for the first session (first to last), with the second session's running order reversed from the results of the first session (slowest to quickest). In each session, each driver recorded one timed lap with no other cars on track, and the starting order was determined by the quickest laps in the second session. The first qualifying session took place in cloudy but warm weather. Barrichello was the second driver to set a lap and was fastest at 1:26.372. Räikkönen ran wide at the first corner and was second, 0.179 seconds slower than Barrichello. Villeneuve drove the spare BAR car after his engine failed in the first practice session, claiming third with a clean lap that set the session's final sub-1:27 lap. He had no time to locate his racing setup and was unfamiliar with the racing line and braking points after lacking driving time. Michael Schumacher was the first to set a lap and took fourth, having run on dirt from the circuit for other drivers, slowing him. Button was third but was demoted to fifth by his teammate Villeneuve following a slow middle sector, overrunning turn one slightly, and understeering at the final turn. Coulthard ran a mistake-free lap to go sixth despite an unbalanced car. Alonso took seventh after braking too deeply for turn three in the first sector, losing momentum. Panis took eighth after losing time to understeer at turn one. He was marginally faster than Trulli in ninth. Montoya lacked speed, ran conservatively and went 10th despite losing time in some corners. Da Matta missed a braking point, ran wide into the final set of corners, and took 11th. Heidfeld made some driver errors en route to 12th. His Sauber teammate Heinz-Harald Frentzen drove the spare car but lost time after running wide in turn four, taking 13th. Fisichella, 14th, had some graining on his front tyres, meaning his car behaved inconsistently for the final part of the lap. Webber almost lost control of his Jaguar through the first two turns and drove uncleanly for 15th. Ralf Schumacher ran wide and into the grass at turn one after pushing too hard, claiming 16th as his car understeered significantly in slow-speed turns. Firman, 17th, understeered into the turn 13 gravel trap, and his rear wheels slewed but rejoined the circuit. The understeer increased towards the end of the lap as the tyres wore. Verstappen was 18th and his car stopped after completing his lap due to a minor technical fault. Pizzonia, 19th, had understeer, locked the brakes and mounted the kerbing. Wilson's initial throttle troubles were cured by his quick lap. He was 20th, finding driving a car with a light fuel load was a major difference but was the slowest driver in the field.

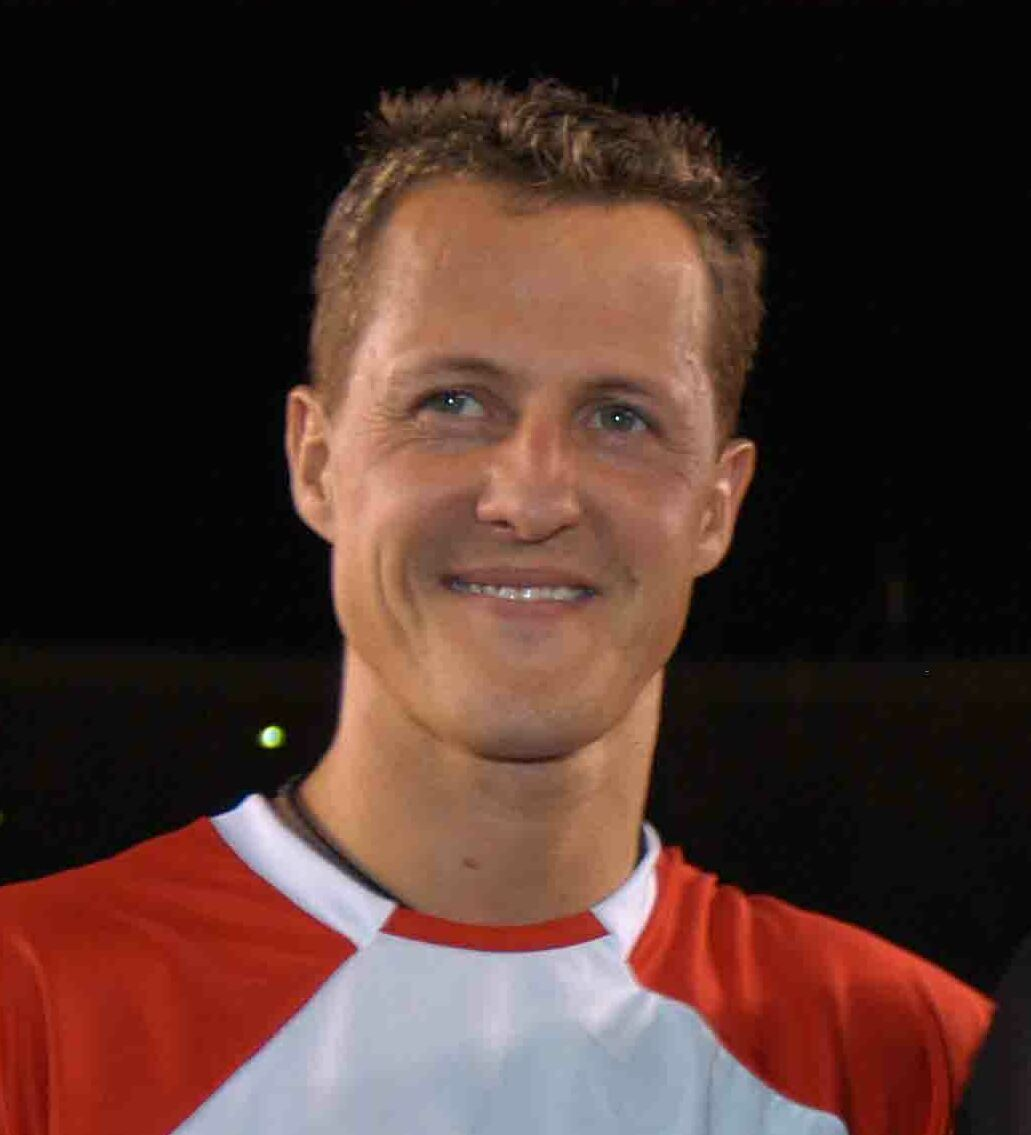
Michael Schumacher (pictured in 2005) qualified on pole position for the 51st time in his career with the fastest lap time in the second qualifying session.

The second qualifying session was held in warm, sunny weather with patchy clouds. An hour before the session began, light rain fell, although the circuit was dry. Following his practice session crash, Michael Schumacher copied his teammate Barrichello's setup, taking the 51st pole position of his career with a lap time of 1:27.173. His teammate Barrichello was 0.245 seconds slower in second. He was distracted by debris from Räikkönen's left-rear tyre in turn six, forcing him to pass him in the second sector. Although his warm-up lap was slow, Montoya lost some time at turn one after a racing setup change and took third. Frentzen qualified fourth in a more balanced car despite an error at the second chicane. Panis, fifth, appeared to be stable and fuel-heavy. Although he ran wide onto dust, Villeneuve took sixth, the faster BAR driver. He ran wide, lost control of his car at turn four, and the traction control system cut in heavily leaving turns. Heidfeld said he pushed his car to the limit without going off the track, taking seventh. Button's car became twitchy when the wind intensified during the warm-up session, leaving him eighth. Ralf Schumacher was the slower Williams driver in ninth. He lost time running slightly wide at turn one due to poor track conditions. Alonso, 10th, lost control of the rear of his Renault between turns nine and 10. Coulthard, 11th, ran slightly wide at turn one and did not recover. Trulli appeared to run a heavy fuel load and was 12th after heavy understeer. Fisichella was the faster Jordan driver in 13th. Webber made an error at the first corner and was 14th. Räikkönen drove the spare car to 15th. He pushed too hard and put a wheel onto the grass towards the end of his quick lap, damaging his left-rear tyre, which burst on the cool-down lap. Da Matta missed the warm-up session due to a clutch issue and was 16th. Firman took 17th with a minor understeer. Pizzonia was the final driver to set a lap, qualifying 18th after running wide at turn five. After reviewing the team's strategy with the FIA, Minardi owner Paul Stoddart instructed his drivers Verstappen and Wilson to complete their fast laps early and enter the pit lane to avoid being impounded under the closed parc fermé regime. This allowed Minardi's mechanics to work on the cars; Verstappen and Wilson were both allowed to start the race due to their lap times in the first qualifying session.

=== Qualifying classification ===
Pos	No.	Driver	Constructor	Q1 Time	Q2 Time	Gap	Grid
1	1	(Germany) Michael Schumacher	Ferrari	1:27.103	1:27.173	—	1
2	2	(Brazil) Rubens Barrichello	Ferrari	1:26.372	1:27.418	+0.245	2
3	3	(Colombia) Juan Pablo Montoya	Williams-BMW	1:27.450	1:28.101	+0.928	3
4	10	(Germany) Heinz-Harald Frentzen	Sauber-Petronas	1:27.563	1:28.274	+1.101	4
5	20	(France) Olivier Panis	Toyota	1:27.352	1:28.288	+1.115	5
6	16	(Canada) Jacques Villeneuve	BAR-Honda	1:26.832	1:28.420	+1.247	6
7	9	(Germany) Nick Heidfeld	Sauber-Petronas	1:27.510	1:28.464	+1.291	7
8	17	(United Kingdom) Jenson Button	BAR-Honda	1:27.159	1:28.682	+1.509	8
9	4	(Germany) Ralf Schumacher	Williams-BMW	1:28.266	1:28.830	+1.657	9
10	8	(Spain) Fernando Alonso	Renault	1:27.255	1:28.928	+1.755	10
11	5	(United Kingdom) David Coulthard	McLaren-Mercedes	1:27.242	1:29.105	+1.932	11
12	7	(Italy) Jarno Trulli	Renault	1:27.411	1:29.136	+1.963	12
13	11	(Italy) Giancarlo Fisichella	Jordan-Ford	1:27.633	1:29.344	+2.171	13
14	14	(Australia) Mark Webber	Jaguar-Cosworth	1:27.675	1:29.367	+2.194	14
15	6	(Finland) Kimi Räikkönen	McLaren-Mercedes	1:26.551	1:29.470	+2.297	15
16	21	(Brazil) Cristiano da Matta	Toyota	1:27.478	1:29.538	+2.365	16
17	12	(Republic of Ireland) Ralph Firman	Jordan-Ford	1:29.977	1:31.242	+4.069	17
18	15	(Brazil) Antônio Pizzonia	Jaguar-Cosworth	1:30.092	1:31.723	+4.550	18
19	19	(Netherlands) Jos Verstappen	Minardi-Cosworth	1:30.053	No time^{1}	—	19
20	18	(United Kingdom) Justin Wilson	Minardi-Cosworth	1:30.479	No time^{1}	—	20

Notes

- ^1 – Jos Verstappen and Justin Wilson did not set a lap time in the second session, in order to avoid the parc fermé regime.

== Race ==
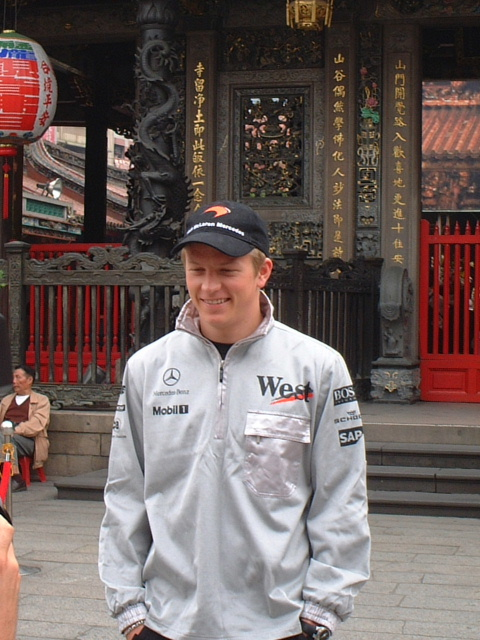
Kimi Räikkönen (pictured in 2002) finished in third after entering the pit lane at the end of the formation lap.

The race took place in overcast conditions in the afternoon from 14:00 local time. There were 116,700 spectators, 10,000 fewer than the previous year and the lowest since 1998. It rained heavily before the race due to an overnight thunderstorm, but it ceased around 15 minutes before the start. This dampened the track slightly but a strong wind was causing it to dry up. The air temperature was 17 to 19 °C (63 to 66 °F) and the asphalt temperature was between 18 to 26 °C (64 to 79 °F). During the installation period, Verstappen began the race from the pit lane in the spare Minardi car setup for teammate Wilson because his race car had developed an oil leak. Although most drivers started on intermediate tyres, Montoya and Panis had dry grooved tyres. At the end of the formation lap, Räikkönen was called into the pit lane by McLaren for dry tyres and fuel. It came after the McLaren drivers reported that the circuit was drier than expected. When the five red lights went out to begin the race, Michael Schumacher retained his race lead over teammate Barrichello, who jumped the start, as the entire field entered turn one without incident. Panis moved into fourth at turn one, but he dropped seven positions from his starting position as cars on wet tyres were faster. Heidfeld advanced from fifth to third by the end of the first lap, passing Montoya at Ascari, while Wilson gained six spots in the same distance.

At the end of the first lap, Michael Schumacher was 1.5 seconds ahead of teammate Barrichello. Heidfeld was 5.8 seconds behind, ahead of Montoya, Frentzen, Button, Villeneuve and Alonso. The two Ferrari drivers pulled away from the rest of the field. According to Crash.net, it was clear that the dry compound tyres would need some time to reach their peak performance, but by the end of lap two, they would be the preferred tyre for the rest of the race. On lap three, Montoya overtook Heidfeld on the start/finish straight for third. McLaren summoned Coulthard to the pit lane for fuel and dry tyres, dropping to the back of the field. On the same lap, Frentzen passed teammate Heidfeld for fourth while Alonso overtook the two BAR drivers for sixth. Montoya started closing in on the Ferrari drivers from lap four. The asphalt was drying quickly, and the intermediate tyres' advantage was diminishing. On lap five, Alonso passed Heidleld near the golf course for fifth and Frentzen at Jones corner for fourth.

Barrichello's jump start was ruled to be illegal and he received a drive-through penalty on lap five. The following lap, Barrichello's wet tyres lost traction, and he lost control of his Ferrari's rear. At Whiteford corner, he spun backwards into the tyre barrier, damaging the front-left wheel, which went below the nose cone and rear wing. Debris and dirt was scattered across the circuit. Firman in eighth lost control of his car going through Barrichello's debris on lap seven, crashing into the Whiteford turn tyre barrier. Michael Schumacher entered the pit lane for dry tyres on the same lap. His stop was slow because mechanics had trouble fitting the left-rear tyre, dropping him to tenth. Montoya now led, followed by Alonso and Trulli. On lap eight, Da Matta spun into the turn three gravel trap and retired while attempting to pass both Michael Schumacher and Pizzonia on the inside. The safety car was deployed on lap nine to close the field and allow marshals to clear debris left by Barrichello and Firman on the track. Some drivers made pit stops under safety car conditions. Alonso stopped from second and fell to the rear of the field.

The safety car entered the pit lane at the end of lap 11 and racing resumed with Montoya leading. Räikkönen overtook Webber on the inside into turn one for fourth and Michael Schumacher passed Webber on the same lap. Montoya set a series of fastest laps to pull six seconds clear of Trulli by the end of lap 15. On the following lap, Webber's mounted the turn nine kerb, breaking the right-rear suspension, and causing his Jaguar to crab sideways. He retired at the edge of the racing line at Lauda corner. This moved Coulthard to sixth. At the end of lap 17, Montoya chose to make a pit stop, followed by Trulli and Ralf Schumacher; the German driver had a slow pit stop since the mechanics could not fit the right rear wheel, and he spun at turn one but continued driving, demoting him from third to last. This caused Alonso, who was battling Ralf Schumacher, to run across the gravel trap as Räikkönen became the new race leader. Wilson retired on lap 18 due to a loose stone creating a hole in the car's radiator, which raised the water temperature. Because Webber's Jaguar was deemed in a dangerous position, the race director deployed the safety car for the second time to allow marshals to move the car off the track.

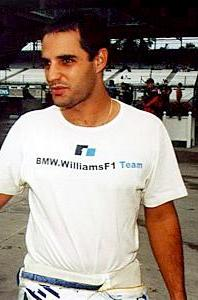
Juan Pablo Montoya (pictured in 2002) was leading on lap 48 until he lost control of his car, leaving him to finish second.

The safety car was withdrawn at the end of lap 20, and Räikkönen returned the field to racing pace. On the next lap, at turn three, Montoya passed Panis for sixth. That same lap, Heidfeld's front-right suspension failed at the fast Waite chicane, ending his race and causing Ralf Schumacher to drive into the gravel trap at high speed. Michael Schumacher threatened Räikkönen's lead when his Michelin tyres began to deteriorate, limiting the amount of available grip. The duel allowed Coulthard to gain on the pair slowly. Villeneuve chose to make a pit stop a lap later than planned on lap 25, and he was followed by teammate Button for his scheduled stop. This caused confusion within the BAR team and Button lost around 15 seconds. Both BAR drivers fell to 13th and 14th, respectively. Unable to pass Räikkönen, Michael Schumacher made his second pit stop on lap 29, trying to undercut the former. His stop lasted nine seconds, dropping him to sixth and moving Coulthard to second. Pizzonia spun from ninth on lap 31 and fell to 12th.

Räikkönen was five seconds ahead of Coulthard, who made his pit stop for fuel and tyres on lap 32 and rejoined the track in sixth, behind Michael Schumacher. Räikkönen made a pit stop for fuel and tyres from the lead on the next lap. He fell to third, trailing Frentzen, whom he quickly overtook, but ahead of Michael Schumacher. This put Montoya into the lead. Panis retired on lap 33, following a drive-through penalty for crossing the white line at the pit lane exit, due to a fuel pressure system issue. Michael Schumacher moved into third when Frentzen made a pit stop for fuel and tyres on lap 36. Räikkönen slowed, allowing Michael Schumacher to slipstream him on the start/finish straight into turn one two laps later. Michael Schumacher attempted to overtake Räikkönen on the outside for second, but Räikkönen defended his position, forcing Schumacher to run across the high kerb and onto the left side of the grass at the exit of turn one. However, on that lap, Räikkönen was imposed a drive-through penalty for exceeding the 80 km/h (50 mph) pit lane speed limit by 1.1 km/h (0.68 mph) because of a speed controller glitch. He fell to seventh after serving the penalty at the end of lap 39. Alonso passed Trulli for fourth, while Michael Schumacher drove wide onto the turn 12 kerbing, damaging the bargeboards and floor on the following lap.

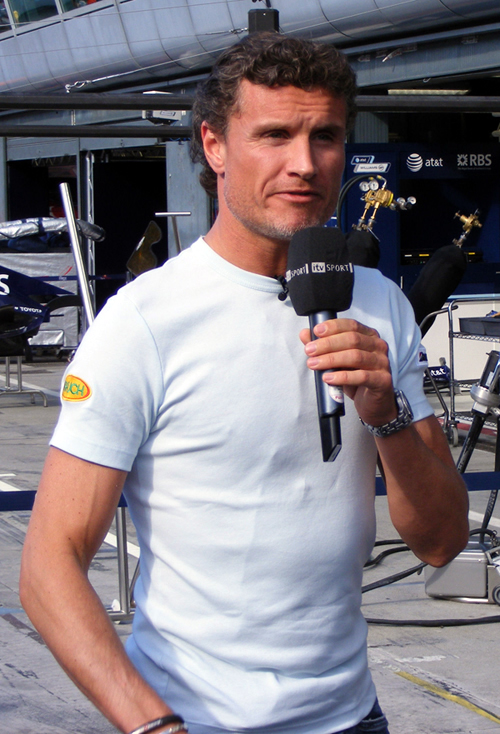
David Coulthard (pictured in 2007) took the 13th and last Formula One victory of his career.

Ralf Schumacher and his teammate Montoya made their final pit stops on laps 41 and 42. Michael Schumacher retook the lead with Montoya in second. Meanwhile, Räikkönen ran wide into the gravel at turn 14 but rejoined the track without damage. On lap 44, Michael Schumacher's right aerodynamic bargeboard turning vanes detached from the Ferrari and became lodged beneath the sidepod in front of the right-rear wheel, impairing the car's handling. Trulli made a pit stop from fourth on the next lap, a position Räikkönen inherited. On lap 46, race control displayed the black flag with an orange disc, prompting Michael Schumacher to enter the pit lane. He did so, fuel was added to his car, and the right-hand bargeboard was repaired, putting him fourth behind Räikkönen. With 12 laps left, it appeared Montoya would win the race. On lap 48, however, Montoya ran wide after riding the kerbs at the exit of Jones corner. He spun 180 degrees backwards and glanced the tyre barrier. He rejoined the race, but fell to second, giving Coulthard the lead.

Räikkönen closed on Montoya, but Michael Schumacher in fourth put him under pressure. There was no changes of position between the three drivers. On lap 54, Pizzonia pulled off the circuit to retire from the race with a rear suspension failure. Fisichella retired in the garage from ninth on the same lap due to a gearbox shift point failure. Coulthard was untroubled, maintaining the lead for the final ten laps to take his 13th and final career win. Montoya finished second, 8.675 seconds back, while Räikkönen came in third, 0.517 seconds later. Michael Schumacher finished fourth, his first race off the podium since the 2001 Italian Grand Prix, ending Ferrari's 53-race streak of podium finishes that began at the 1999 Malaysian Grand Prix. Trulli finished fifth, five seconds clear of Frentzen in sixth, whose first pit stop was moved forward due to tyre problems. Alonso scored his first two championship points for finishing seventh. Ralf Schumacher was the final championship points scorer in eighth. Villeneuve and Button were separated by four-tenths of a second in ninth and tenth. Verstappen was the last finisher after being unable to select gear exiting the pit lane. Fisichella and Pizzonia were the final classified finishers despite retiring. There were seven lead changes among four different drivers, and two safety car deployments.

=== Post-race ===
The top three drivers appeared on the podium to collect their trophies and spoke to the media in the subsequent press conference. Coulthard said from McLaren's perspective, they should relish finishing first and third, adding, "The circumstances enable us to get that on this day in history so we can be satisfied." He said that while he did not overtake many drivers, it was difficult to complain about a Grand Prix victory. Montoya thought the race was "pretty disastrous" because the two safety car periods eliminated his lead over the rest of the field and acknowledged he was at fault for his spin that lost him the race victory. He expressed frustration because race leads could be wiped out because outcomes are often beyond the control of the driver's, highlighting Formula One's unpredictability. Räikkönen said the decision was made to switch to dry-weather tyres instead of staying on intermediate compounds to save time, but luck did not favour the outcome.

Ferrari technical director Ross Brawn stated that the race "was one of those afternoons that didn't work out for us" because the team started on the wrong tyre compound and switched to dry tyres too late. Ferrari sporting director Jean Todt called it "a very strange race and not really because of the new rules" because of the weather, differing race strategies and two safety car deployments. He said the result demonstrated that a minor error could result in a serious disadvantage. Michael Schumacher commented of his absence from the podium for the first time since 2001, "It is normal that one day it will change – in sport that's the way it goes." Barrichello attributed his early-race collision to soreness in his collarbone caused by the HANS device fitted between the neck and helmet, implying that he was not fully focused on the circuit. He added that "It was not a good weekend" but felt that Ferrari were still performing decently.

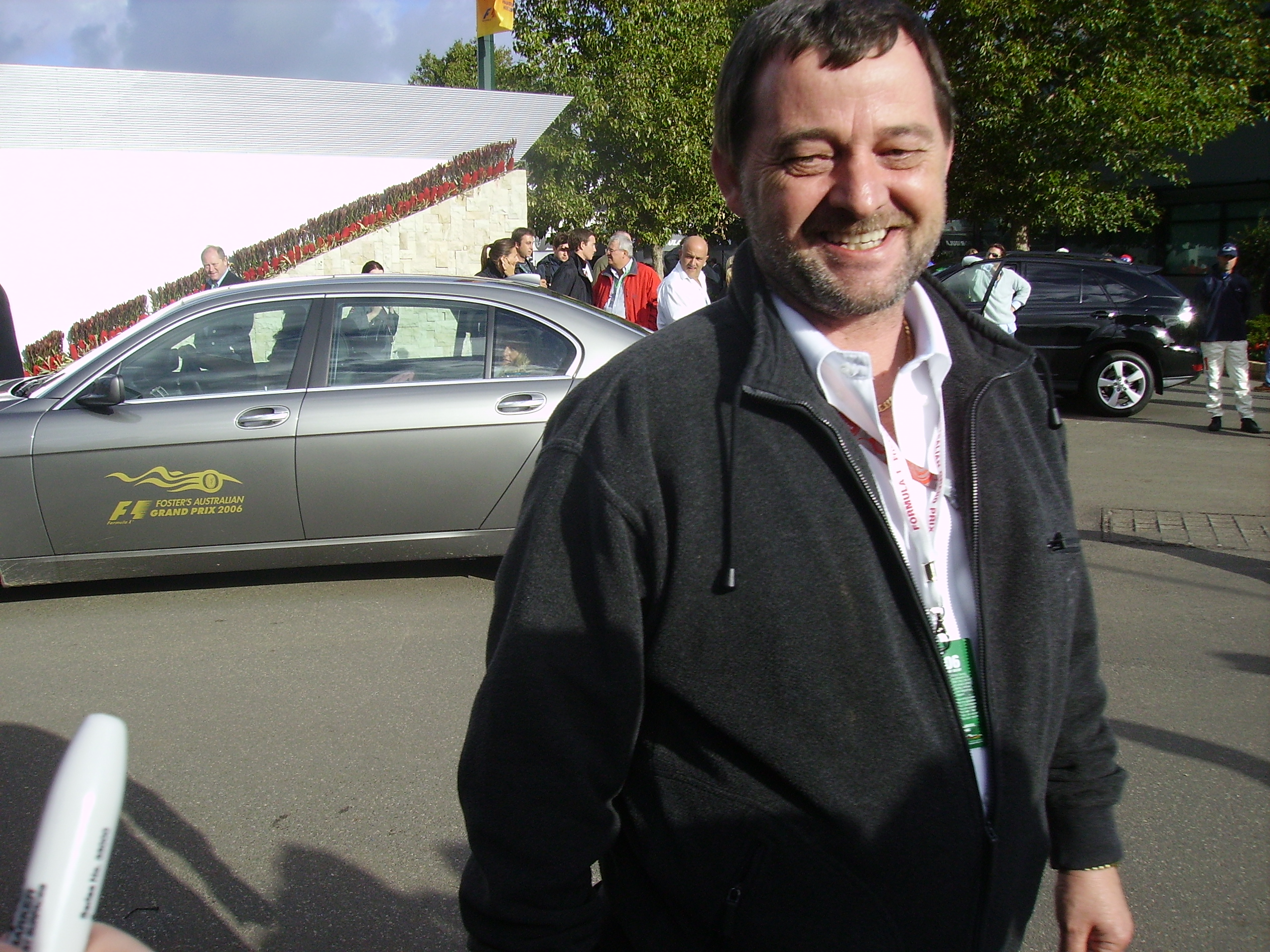
Paul Stoddart (pictured in 2006) was complimentary of the revised sporting regulations adopted for the first time in the race.

Stoddart said that Formula One won under the new sporting regulations implemented in Australia, and that the modifications should be highly appreciated, adding, "Who could say this was anything other than the most exciting race we have had for a long time?" Gerald Donaldson of the Toronto Star also agreed that Formula One was "the real winner" in Australia. BAR team principal David Richards said the objective of the changes was to improve the racing, calling it "a good race and very encouraging." Mosley described it as "a very, very exciting race and completely unpredictable" race, "There was something happening all the time, there was never a dull period. I'd give it an eight or nine (out of 10) but I would have to say that the weather played a part." Coulthard was more reserved, saying "I think we will only be able to judge that (whether the rules contributed to the excitement) on reflection of the season." Ecclestone dismissed suggestions the changes contributed to the incidents observed in Melbourne.

Villeneuve blamed his early pit lane entry on lap 25 on radio problems and apologised to Button for the error. Button said that Villeneuve's actions had "completely buggered my race" and lost him a large amount of time, adding it made him angry and frustrated, "There is nothing you can do then, it completely destroyed the race." Richards argued that Villeneuve was unable to correctly listen to his radio. Michelin motorsport director Pierre Dupasquier was humble about the result of the tyre company sweeping the podium places for the first time since its return to Formula One in 2001, "Today's result was partly affected by the weather and partly by the Safety Car periods, so it is hard to draw any firm conclusions, but it is clear that our tyres were fast, consistent and very durable." Frentzen stated he was happy to finish sixth and put Alonso behind him in his first race for Sauber since leaving to join Williams at the end of 1996. Firman believed he ran onto an patch of oil when he crashed.

Because this was the first race of the season, Coulthard led the World Drivers' Championship with ten championship points. Montoya was second with eight championship points while Räikkönen was third with six championship points. Michael Schumacher was fourth in the standings, losing the lead he had held since the 2000 United States Grand Prix. Trulli was fifth with four championship points. McLaren led the World Constructors' Championship with 16 championship points, seven ahead of Williams in second and ten in front of Renault with 15 races remaining in the season.

=== Race classification ===
Drivers who scored championship points are denoted in bold.

Pos	No	Driver	Constructor	Tyre	Laps	Time/Retired	Grid	Points
1	5	(United Kingdom) **David Coulthard**	**McLaren-Mercedes**	M	58	1:34:42.124	11	10
2	3	(Colombia) **Juan Pablo Montoya**	**Williams-BMW**	M	58	+8.675	3	8
3	6	(Finland) **Kimi Räikkönen**	**McLaren-Mercedes**	M	58	+9.192	PL^{1}	6
4	1	(Germany) **Michael Schumacher**	**Ferrari**	B	58	+9.482	1	5
5	7	(Italy) **Jarno Trulli**	**Renault**	M	58	+38.801	12	4
6	10	(Germany) **Heinz-Harald Frentzen**	**Sauber-Petronas**	B	58	+43.928	4	3
7	8	(Spain) **Fernando Alonso**	**Renault**	M	58	+45.074	10	2
8	4	(Germany) **Ralf Schumacher**	**Williams-BMW**	M	58	+45.745	9	1
9	16	(Canada) Jacques Villeneuve	BAR-Honda	B	58	+1:05.536	6	
10	17	(United Kingdom) Jenson Button	BAR-Honda	B	58	+1:05.974	8	
11	19	(Netherlands) Jos Verstappen	Minardi-Cosworth	B	57	+1 Lap	PL^{1}	
12	11	(Italy) Giancarlo Fisichella	Jordan-Ford	B	52	Gearbox	13	
13	15	(Brazil) Antônio Pizzonia	Jaguar-Cosworth	M	52	Suspension	18	
Ret	20	(France) Olivier Panis	Toyota	M	31	Fuel pressure	5	
Ret	9	(Germany) Nick Heidfeld	Sauber-Petronas	B	20	Suspension	7	
Ret	18	(United Kingdom) Justin Wilson	Minardi-Cosworth	B	16	Radiator	20	
Ret	14	(Australia) Mark Webber	Jaguar-Cosworth	M	15	Suspension	14	
Ret	21	(Brazil) Cristiano da Matta	Toyota	M	7	Spun off	16	
Ret	12	(Republic of Ireland) Ralph Firman	Jordan-Ford	B	6	Accident	17	
Ret	2	(Brazil) Rubens Barrichello	Ferrari	B	5	Accident	2	

Notes

- **^1** – Kimi Räikkönen and Jos Verstappen started the race from the pit lane.

== Championship standings after the race ==
Drivers' Championship standings

Pos	Driver	Points
1	(United Kingdom) David Coulthard	10
2	(Colombia) Juan Pablo Montoya	8
3	(Finland) Kimi Räikkönen	6
4	(Germany) Michael Schumacher	5
5	(Italy) Jarno Trulli	4

Constructors' Championship standings

Pos	Constructor	Points
1	(United Kingdom) McLaren-Mercedes	16
2	(United Kingdom) Williams-BMW	9
3	(France) Renault	6
4	(Italy) Ferrari	5
5	(Switzerland) Sauber-Petronas	3
Sources:

- Note: Only the top five positions are included for both sets of standings.

Previous race: 2002 Japanese Grand Prix	FIA Formula One World Championship; 2003 season	Next race: 2003 Malaysian Grand Prix
Previous race: 2002 Australian Grand Prix	Australian Grand Prix	Next race: 2004 Australian Grand Prix
