= Antonia Terzi =

Italian aerodynamicist (1971–2021)

- Born: 29 April 1971; Mirandola, Emilia-Romagna, Italy
- Died: 26 October 2021 (aged 50); United Kingdom
- Education: University of Exeter (PhD)
- Alma mater: University of Modena and Reggio Emilia (BS, MS)

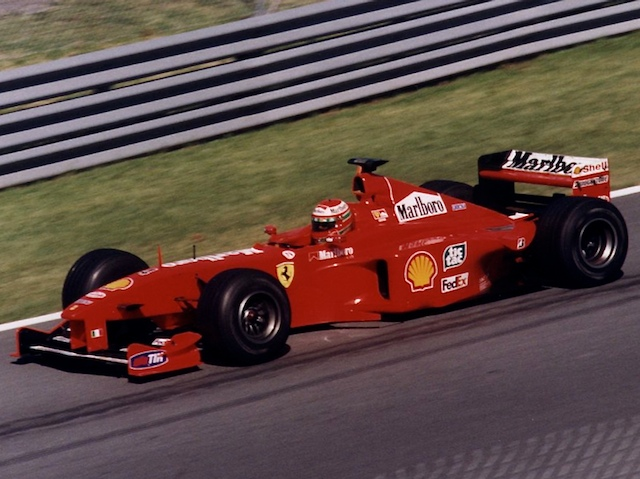
Ferrari F399

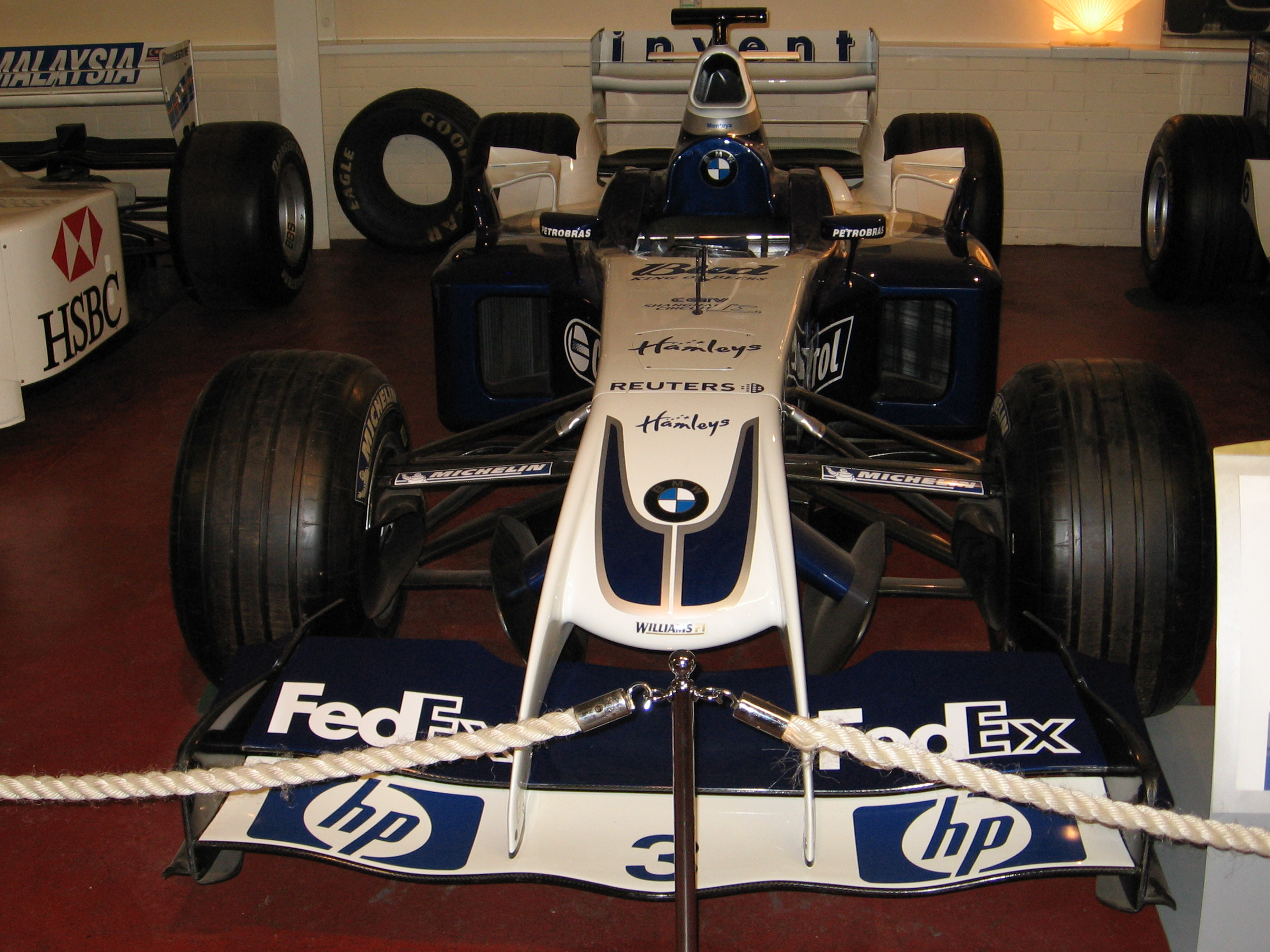
Williams FW26 with 'Walrus nose'

Antonia Terzi (29 April 1971 – 26 October 2021) was an Italian aerodynamicist who worked for the Ferrari and Williams Formula One teams.

== Education ==
Born in Mirandola, Terzi held a Master's degree in Materials Engineering from University of Modena and Reggio Emilia in Italy and a PhD in engineering, focused on aerodynamics, from University of Exeter in the United Kingdom.

== Career ==
Terzi worked in the design department at Ferrari under Rory Byrne until 2001 when she was recruited by Williams to become the team's chief aerodynamicist.

During Terzi's tenure, Williams had three good seasons with both drivers Ralf Schumacher and Juan Pablo Montoya regularly scoring points and winning races. In 2004 Terzi introduced a controversial 'Walrus nose' on the Williams FW26 which did not work and had to be replaced mid-season by a conventional design. Terzi left Williams in November 2004 at the end of the season.

She was later employed as an assistant professor by The Delft University of Technology, working together with Professor Wubbo Ockels at the Faculty of Aerospace Engineering. She was the chief vehicle designer of the TU Delft Superbus.

From 2014 until 2019, she was the head of the aerodynamics team at Bentley Motors Ltd.

In 2020, she was appointed Full Professor at the Australian National University in Canberra, Australia.

== Death ==
Terzi died in a car accident in the UK on 26 October 2021. The exact location and the details of the crash have not been disclosed.
