= Williams FW24 =

Formula One racing car

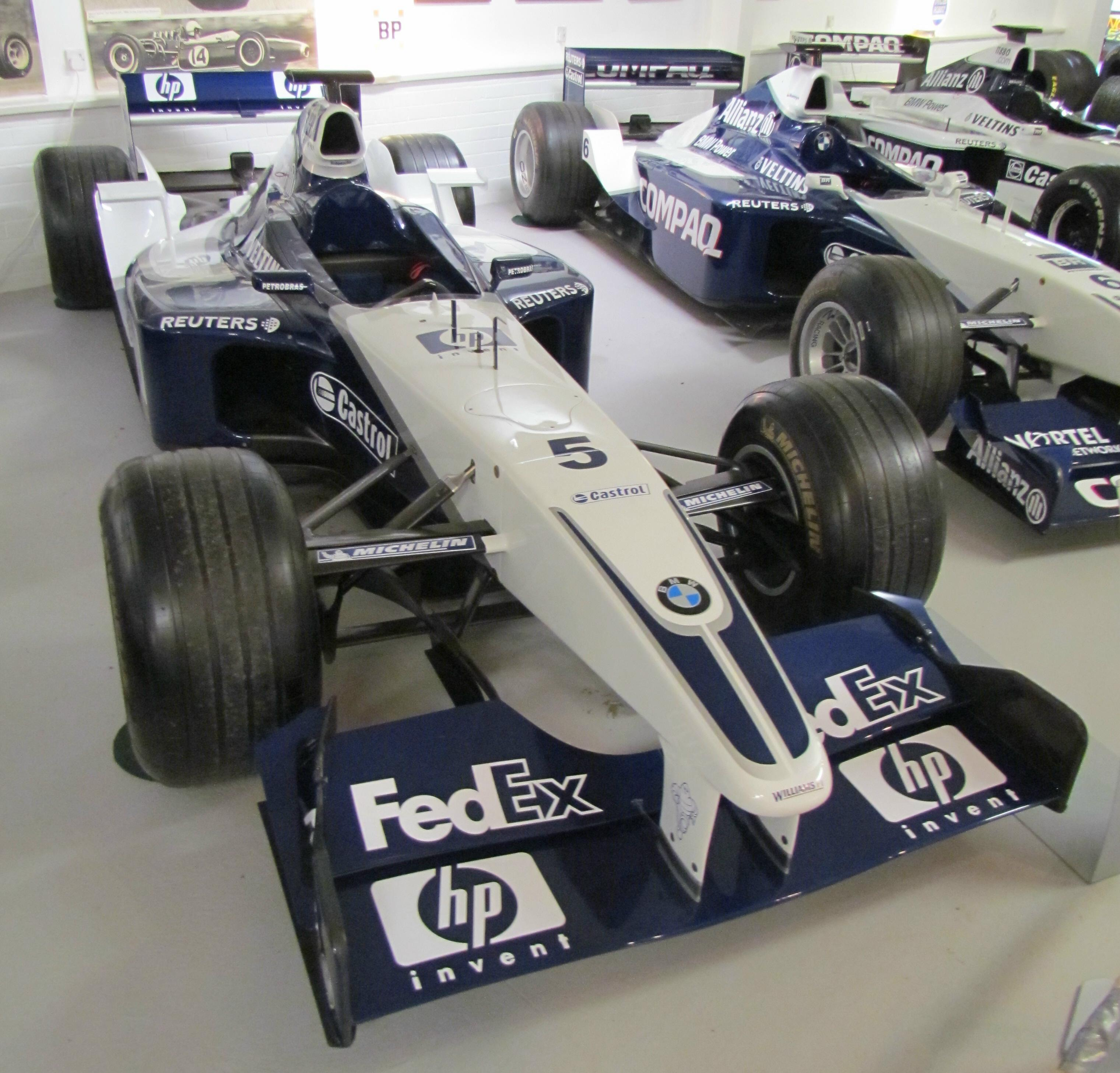
- The FW24 of Ralf Schumacher
- Category: Formula One
- Constructor: Williams
- Designers: Patrick Head (Technical Director); Gavin Fisher (Chief Designer); Brian O'Roake (Chief Composites Engineer); Mark Tatham (Chief Mechanical Engineer); Steve Wise (Head of Electronics); Geoff Willis (Head of Aerodynamics); Jason Somerville (Principal Aerodynamicist); Nick Alcock (Principal Aerodynamicist); Werner Laurenz (Technical Engine Director - BMW); Heinz Paschen (Chief Designer, Engine - BMW)
- Predecessor: Williams FW23
- Successor: Williams FW25

Technical specifications
- Chassis: Carbon-fibre monocoque
- Suspension (front): Williams double wishbone, torsion bar, pushrod
- Suspension (rear): Williams double wishbone, coil spring, pushrod
- Length: 4540 mm
- Engine: BMW P82 2998 cc V10 (90°) naturally aspirated
- Transmission: Williams 7-speed longitudinal semi-automatic sequential
- Power: 880-900 hp @ 19,050 rpm
- Weight: 600 kg
- Fuel: Petrobras
- Lubricants: Castrol
- Tyres: Michelin

Competition history
- Notable entrants: BMW Williams F1 Team
- Notable drivers: 5. (Germany) Ralf Schumacher; 6. (Colombia) Juan Pablo Montoya
- Debut: 2002 Australian Grand Prix
- First win: 2002 Malaysian Grand Prix
- Last win: 2002 Malaysian Grand Prix
- Last event: 2002 Japanese Grand Prix
Races	Wins	Podiums	Poles	F/Laps
17	1	13	7	3
- Constructors' Championships: 0
- Drivers' Championships: 0

The Williams FW24 was the Formula One car with which the Williams team competed in the 2002 Formula One World Championship. It was driven by German Ralf Schumacher and Colombian Juan Pablo Montoya. Test drivers were Marc Gené, Giorgio Pantano and Antônio Pizzonia.

== Design and development ==
The car was closely based on the previous year's FW23, and powered by a development of the ultra-powerful BMW engine from 2001.

== Season summary ==
Ralf Schumacher scored the team's only win of the season in Malaysia, and Juan Pablo Montoya finishing second saw the team register their first 1–2 finish since the 1996 Portuguese Grand Prix.

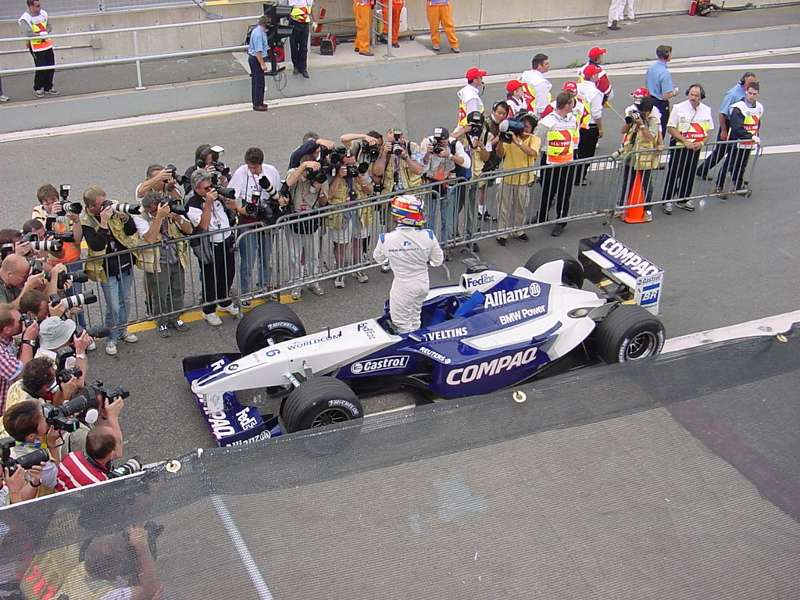
Juan Pablo Montoya exiting his FW24 after securing pole position for the 2002 Canadian Grand Prix

Montoya set a run of five consecutive pole positions with the car in midseason (eventually getting seven during the season), and completed the then fastest lap of any circuit in Formula 1 history during qualifying, setting pole position at Monza for the Italian Grand Prix with a lap average of 161.449 mph (259.827 km/h), completing the lap in 1:20.264, breaking the record previously set by former Williams driver Keke Rosberg at the 1985 British Grand Prix at Silverstone who lapped at an average of 160.9 mph (258.9 km/h) in his Honda turbo-powered Williams FW10.

Williams finished second in the Constructors' Championship but over 100 points behind Ferrari, with Montoya and Schumacher third and fourth respectively in the Drivers' Championship.

== Sponsorship and livery ==
The primary colours of the FW24 were white and blue. Williams began the season with Compaq sponsorship. However, from the British Grand Prix onwards, the team had title sponsorship from Hewlett-Packard, following the merger between the two companies.

In France, to satisfy regulations banning the advertising of alcohol, the Veltins logo was replaced with "V??????".

== Other use ==
On 3 December 2002, Nico Rosberg conducted his first ever test in a Formula One car in a Williams FW24 Circuit de Catalunya. At the time, he became the youngest person ever to drive a Formula One car.

In 2003, 4-time NASCAR Cup Series champion Jeff Gordon drove the FW24 at the Indianapolis Motor Speedway.

== Complete Formula One results ==
(key) (results in bold indicate pole position)

Year	Team	Engine	Tyres	Drivers	1	2	3	4	5	6	7	8	9	10	11	12	13	14	15	16	17	Points	WCC
2002	Williams	BMW P82 V10	**MI**		AUS	MAL	BRA	SMR	ESP	AUT	MON	CAN	EUR	GBR	FRA	GER	HUN	BEL	ITA	USA	JPN	**92**	**2nd**
2002	Williams	BMW P82 V10	**MI**	(Germany) Ralf Schumacher	Ret	1	2	3	11^{†}	4	3	7	4	8	5	3	3	5	Ret	16	11^{†}	**92**	**2nd**
2002	Williams	BMW P82 V10	**MI**	(Colombia) Juan Pablo Montoya	2	2	**5**	4	2	3	**Ret**	**Ret**	**Ret**	**3**	**4**	2	11	3	**Ret**	4	4	**92**	**2nd**

^{†} Driver did not finish the Grand Prix but was classified as he completed over 90% of the race distance.

== Sponsors ==
Brand	Country	Placed on
HP	United States	Front wing, nose, rear wing
Compaq	United States	Sidepods
Castrol	United Kingdom	Rear wing end plate, nose, nosecone
Veltins	Germany	Side
Petrobras	Brazil	Mirrors, rear wing end plate
Reuters	United Kingdom	Sidepods
Allianz	Germany	Front wing end plate, fin
BMW	Germany	Nosecone, fin
WorldCom	United States	Nose
FedEx	United States	Front wing, nose, fin
