= Gavin Fisher =

British chief designer (born 1964)

- Born: 30 August 1964 (age 62)
- Occupation: former Chief Designer of Williams Formula One team

Gavin Fisher (born 30 August 1964) is a British former Chief Designer of the Williams Formula One team.

== Career ==
He studied mechanical engineering at University of Hertfordshire, which was famous for its aeronautical engineers, graduating with a first class honors degree. He was hired by Williams through an advertisement in the media in 1988 after spending time with Ricardo transmissions. A few months later, Adrian Newey joined Williams from Leyton House and Fisher worked with him until Newey left in 1997 to join McLaren. Fisher, his pupil, was promoted to the role of chief designer, a role that he held until 2005.

In September 2004, Gavin Fisher was seriously injured in a motorbike crash and underwent surgery for a broken pelvis in a hospital in Los Angeles. Senior designer Mark Loasby took over the design of next year's Williams race car during his absence.

== Personal life ==
Fisher currently follows a number of pursuits including snowboarding, riding motorbikes and sailing boats.
