= Williams Grand Prix results =

The table below details the complete Grand Prix racing results for Williams Racing. The team has also competed in several non-championship Formula One races.

== Formula One World Championship results ==
=== Works team entries ===
==== 1970s ====
(key)

Year	Chassis	Engine	Tyres	Drivers	1	2	3	4	5	6	7	8	9	10	11	12	13	14	15	16	17	Points	WCC
1977	March 761	Ford Cosworth DFV 3.0 V8	G		ARG	BRA	RSA	USW	ESP	MON	BEL	SWE	FRA	GBR	GER	AUT	NED	ITA	USA	CAN	JPN	—N/a	—N/a
1977	March 761	Ford Cosworth DFV 3.0 V8	G	(Belgium) Patrick Nève					12		10	15	DNQ	10	DNQ	9	DNQ	7	18	Ret		—N/a	—N/a
1978	FW06	Ford Cosworth DFV 3.0 V8	G		ARG	BRA	RSA	USW	MON	BEL	ESP	SWE	FRA	GBR	GER	AUT	NED	ITA	USA	CAN		11	9th
1978	FW06	Ford Cosworth DFV 3.0 V8	G	(Australia) Alan Jones	Ret	14	4	7^{F}	Ret	10	8	Ret	5	Ret	Ret	Ret	Ret	13	2	9^{F}		11	9th
1979	FW06; FW07	Ford Cosworth DFV 3.0 V8	G		ARG	BRA	RSA	USW	ESP	BEL	MON	FRA	GBR	GER	AUT	NED	ITA	CAN	USA			**75**	**2nd**
1979	FW06; FW07	Ford Cosworth DFV 3.0 V8	G	(Australia) Alan Jones	9	Ret	Ret	3	Ret	Ret	Ret	4	Ret^{P}	1	1	1	9	1^{P}^{F}	Ret^{P}			**75**	**2nd**
1979	FW06; FW07	Ford Cosworth DFV 3.0 V8	G	(Switzerland) Clay Regazzoni	10	15	9	Ret	Ret	Ret	2	6	1^{F}	2	5	Ret	3^{F}	3	Ret			**75**	**2nd**

==== 1980s ====
(key)

Year	Chassis	Engine	Tyres	Drivers	1	2	3	4	5	6	7	8	9	10	11	12	13	14	15	16	Points	WCC
1980	FW07; FW07B	Ford Cosworth DFV 3.0 V8	**G**		ARG	BRA	RSA	USW	BEL	MON	FRA	GBR	GER	AUT	NED	ITA	CAN	USA			**120**	**1st**
1980	FW07; FW07B	Ford Cosworth DFV 3.0 V8	**G**	(Australia) Alan Jones	1^{P}^{F}	3	Ret	Ret	2^{P}	Ret	1^{F}	1	3^{P}^{F}	2	11	2^{F}	1	1^{F}			**120**	**1st**
1980	FW07; FW07B	Ford Cosworth DFV 3.0 V8	**G**	(Argentina) Carlos Reutemann	Ret	Ret	5	Ret	3	1^{F}	6	3	2	3	4	3	2	2			**120**	**1st**
1981	FW07C; FW07D	Ford Cosworth DFV 3.0 V8	**MI**; **G**		USW	BRA	ARG	SMR	BEL	MON	ESP	FRA	GBR	GER	AUT	NED	ITA	CAN	CPL		**95**	**1st**
1981	FW07C; FW07D	Ford Cosworth DFV 3.0 V8	**MI**; **G**	(Australia) Alan Jones	1^{F}	2	4	12	Ret	2^{F}	7^{F}	17	Ret	11^{F}	4	3^{F}	2	Ret	1		**95**	**1st**
1981	FW07C; FW07D	Ford Cosworth DFV 3.0 V8	**MI**; **G**	(Argentina) Carlos Reutemann	2	1	2	3	1^{P}^{F}	Ret	4	10	2	Ret	5	Ret	3^{F}	10	8^{P}		**95**	**1st**
1982	FW07D; FW08	Ford Cosworth DFV 3.0 V8	**G**		RSA	BRA	USW	SMR	BEL	MON	DET	CAN	NED	GBR	FRA	GER	AUT	SUI	ITA	CPL	58	4th
1982	FW07D; FW08	Ford Cosworth DFV 3.0 V8	**G**	(Finland) Keke Rosberg	5	DSQ	2		2	Ret	4	Ret	3	Ret^{P}	5	3	2	1	8	5	58	4th
1982	FW07D; FW08	Ford Cosworth DFV 3.0 V8	**G**	(Argentina) Carlos Reutemann	2	Ret															58	4th
1982	FW07D; FW08	Ford Cosworth DFV 3.0 V8	**G**	(United States) Mario Andretti			Ret														58	4th
1982	FW07D; FW08	Ford Cosworth DFV 3.0 V8	**G**	(Republic of Ireland) Derek Daly					Ret	6	5	7	5	5	7	Ret	Ret	9	Ret	6	58	4th
1983	FW08C	Ford Cosworth DFV 3.0 V8	**G**		BRA	USW	FRA	SMR	MON	BEL	DET	CAN	GBR	GER	AUT	NED	ITA	EUR	RSA		36	4th (Note: Different chassis–engine combinations are scored separately. In the 1983 Constructors' Championship, Williams-Ford placed 4th with 36 points and Williams-Honda placed 11th with 2 points.)
1983	FW08C	Ford Cosworth DFV 3.0 V8	**G**	(Finland) Keke Rosberg	DSQ^{P}	Ret	5	4	1	5	2	4	11	10	8	Ret	11	Ret			36	4th
1983	FW08C	Ford Cosworth DFV 3.0 V8	**G**	(France) Jacques Laffite	4	4	6	7	Ret	6	5	Ret	12	6	Ret	Ret	DNQ	DNQ			36	4th
1983	FW08C	Ford Cosworth DFV 3.0 V8	**G**	(United Kingdom) Jonathan Palmer														13			36	4th
1983	FW09	Honda RA163E 1.5 V6 t	**G**	(Finland) Keke Rosberg															5		2	11th
1983	FW09	Honda RA163E 1.5 V6 t	**G**	(France) Jacques Laffite															Ret		2	11th
1984	FW09; FW09B	Honda RA163E 1.5 V6 t Honda RA164E 1.5 V6 t	**G**		BRA	RSA	BEL	SMR	FRA	MON	CAN	DET	DAL	GBR	GER	AUT	NED	ITA	EUR	POR	25.5	6th
1984	FW09; FW09B	Honda RA163E 1.5 V6 t Honda RA164E 1.5 V6 t	**G**	(Finland) Keke Rosberg	2	Ret	4	Ret	6	4^{‡}	Ret	Ret	1	Ret	Ret	Ret	8	Ret	Ret	Ret	25.5	6th
1984	FW09; FW09B	Honda RA163E 1.5 V6 t Honda RA164E 1.5 V6 t	**G**	(France) Jacques Laffite	Ret	Ret	Ret	Ret	8	8	Ret	5	4	Ret	Ret	Ret	Ret	Ret	Ret	14	25.5	6th
1985	FW10	Honda RA164E 1.5 V6t; Honda RA165E 1.5 V6t	**G**		BRA	POR	SMR	MON	CAN	DET	FRA	GBR	GER	AUT	NED	ITA	BEL	EUR	RSA	AUS	**71**	**3rd**
1985	FW10	Honda RA164E 1.5 V6t; Honda RA165E 1.5 V6t	**G**	(United Kingdom) Nigel Mansell	Ret	5	5	7	6	Ret	DNS	Ret	6	Ret	6	11^{F}	2	1	1^{P}	Ret	**71**	**3rd**
1985	FW10	Honda RA164E 1.5 V6t; Honda RA165E 1.5 V6t	**G**	(Finland) Keke Rosberg	Ret	Ret	Ret	8	4	1	2^{P}^{F}	Ret^{P}	12	Ret	Ret	Ret	4	3	2^{F}	1^{F}	**71**	**3rd**
1986	FW11	Honda RA166E 1.5 V6 t	**G**		BRA	ESP	SMR	MON	BEL	CAN	DET	FRA	GBR	GER	HUN	AUT	ITA	POR	MEX	AUS	**141**	**1st**
1986	FW11	Honda RA166E 1.5 V6 t	**G**	(United Kingdom) Nigel Mansell	Ret	2^{F}	Ret	4	1	1^{P}	5	1^{F}	1^{F}	3	3	Ret	2	1^{F}	5	Ret^{P}	**141**	**1st**
1986	FW11	Honda RA166E 1.5 V6 t	**G**	(Brazil) Nelson Piquet	1^{F}	Ret	2^{F}	7	Ret^{P}	3^{F}	Ret^{F}	3	2^{P}	1	1^{F}	Ret	1	3	4^{F}	2^{F}	**141**	**1st**
1987	FW11B	Honda RA167E 1.5 V6 t	**G**		BRA	SMR	BEL	MON	DET	FRA	GBR	GER	HUN	AUT	ITA	POR	ESP	MEX	JPN	AUS	**137**	**1st**
1987	FW11B	Honda RA167E 1.5 V6 t	**G**	(United Kingdom) Nigel Mansell	6^{P}	1	Ret^{P}	Ret^{P}	5^{P}	1^{P}	1^{F}	Ret^{P}^{F}	14^{P}	1^{F}	3	Ret	1	1^{P}	DNS		**137**	**1st**
1987	FW11B	Honda RA167E 1.5 V6 t	**G**	(Italy) Riccardo Patrese																9	**137**	**1st**
1987	FW11B	Honda RA167E 1.5 V6 t	**G**	(Brazil) Nelson Piquet	2^{F}	DNS	Ret	2	2	2^{F}	2^{P}	1	1^{F}	2^{P}	1^{P}	3	4^{P}	2^{F}	15	Ret	**137**	**1st**
1988	FW12	Judd CV 3.5 V8	**G**		BRA	SMR	MON	MEX	CAN	DET	FRA	GBR	GER	HUN	BEL	ITA	POR	ESP	JPN	AUS	20	7th
1988	FW12	Judd CV 3.5 V8	**G**	(United Kingdom) Nigel Mansell	Ret	Ret	Ret	Ret	Ret	Ret	Ret	2^{F}	Ret	Ret			Ret	2	Ret	Ret	20	7th
1988	FW12	Judd CV 3.5 V8	**G**	(United Kingdom) Martin Brundle											7						20	7th
1988	FW12	Judd CV 3.5 V8	**G**	(France) Jean-Louis Schlesser												11					20	7th
1988	FW12	Judd CV 3.5 V8	**G**	(Italy) Riccardo Patrese	Ret	13	6	Ret	Ret	Ret	Ret	8	Ret	6	Ret	7	Ret	5	6	4	20	7th
1989	FW12C; FW13	Renault RS1 3.5 V10	**G**		BRA	SMR	MON	MEX	USA	CAN	FRA	GBR	GER	HUN	BEL	ITA	POR	ESP	JPN	AUS	**77**	**2nd**
1989	FW12C; FW13	Renault RS1 3.5 V10	**G**	(Belgium) Thierry Boutsen	Ret	4	10	Ret	6	1	Ret	10	Ret	3	4	3	Ret	Ret	3	1	**77**	**2nd**
1989	FW12C; FW13	Renault RS1 3.5 V10	**G**	(Italy) Riccardo Patrese	Ret^{F}	Ret	15	2	2	2	3	Ret	4	Ret^{P}	Ret	4	Ret	5	2	3	**77**	**2nd**

==== 1990s ====
(key)

Year	Chassis	Engine	Tyres	Drivers	1	2	3	4	5	6	7	8	9	10	11	12	13	14	15	16	17	Points	WCC
1990	FW13B	Renault RS2 3.5 V10	G		USA	BRA	SMR	MON	CAN	MEX	FRA	GBR	GER	HUN	BEL	ITA	POR	ESP	JPN	AUS		57	4th
1990	FW13B	Renault RS2 3.5 V10	G	(Belgium) Thierry Boutsen	3	5	Ret	4	Ret	5	Ret	2	6^{F}	1^{P}	Ret	Ret	Ret	4	5	5		57	4th
1990	FW13B	Renault RS2 3.5 V10	G	(Italy) Riccardo Patrese	9	13	1	Ret	Ret	9	6	Ret	5	4^{F}	Ret	5	7^{F}	5^{F}	4^{F}	6		57	4th
1991	FW14	Renault RS3 3.5 V10	G		USA	BRA	SMR	MON	CAN	MEX	FRA	GBR	GER	HUN	BEL	ITA	POR	ESP	JPN	AUS		**125**	**2nd**
1991	FW14	Renault RS3 3.5 V10	G	(United Kingdom) Nigel Mansell	Ret	Ret^{F}	Ret	2	6^{F}	2^{F}	1^{F}	1^{P}^{F}	1^{P}	2	Ret	1	DSQ^{F}	1	Ret	2^{‡}		**125**	**2nd**
1991	FW14	Renault RS3 3.5 V10	G	(Italy) Riccardo Patrese	Ret	2	Ret	Ret	3^{P}	1^{P}	5^{P}	Ret	2^{F}	3	5	Ret	1^{P}	3^{F}	3	5^{‡}		**125**	**2nd**
1992	FW14B	Renault RS3C 3.5 V10; Renault RS4 3.5 V10	G		RSA	MEX	BRA	ESP	SMR	MON	CAN	FRA	GBR	GER	HUN	BEL	ITA	POR	JPN	AUS		**164**	**1st**
1992	FW14B	Renault RS3C 3.5 V10; Renault RS4 3.5 V10	G	(United Kingdom) Nigel Mansell	1^{P}^{F}	1^{P}	1^{P}	1^{P}^{F}	1^{P}	2^{P}^{F}	Ret	1^{P}^{F}	1^{P}^{F}	1^{P}	2^{F}	2^{P}	Ret^{P}^{F}	1^{P}	Ret^{P}^{F}	Ret^{P}		**164**	**1st**
1992	FW14B	Renault RS3C 3.5 V10; Renault RS4 3.5 V10	G	(Italy) Riccardo Patrese	2	2	2^{F}	Ret	2^{F}	3	Ret	2	2	8^{F}	Ret^{P}	3	5	Ret	1	Ret		**164**	**1st**
1993	FW15C	Renault RS5 3.5 V10	G		RSA	BRA	EUR	SMR	ESP	MON	CAN	FRA	GBR	GER	HUN	BEL	ITA	POR	JPN	AUS		**168**	**1st**
1993	FW15C	Renault RS5 3.5 V10	G	(United Kingdom) Damon Hill	Ret	2	2	Ret	Ret	2	3	2^{P}	Ret^{F}	15	1	1	1^{F}	3^{P}^{F}	4	3^{F}		**168**	**1st**
1993	FW15C	Renault RS5 3.5 V10	G	(France) Alain Prost	1^{P}^{F}	Ret^{P}	3^{P}	1^{P}^{F}	1^{P}	4^{P}^{F}	1^{P}	1	1^{P}	1^{P}	12^{P}^{F}	3^{P}^{F}	12^{P}	2	2^{P}^{F}	2		**168**	**1st**
1994	FW16; FW16B	Renault RS6 3.5 V10	G		BRA	PAC	SMR	MON	ESP	CAN	FRA	GBR	GER	HUN	BEL	ITA	POR	EUR	JPN	AUS		**118**	**1st**
1994	FW16; FW16B	Renault RS6 3.5 V10	G	(United Kingdom) Damon Hill	2	Ret	6^{F}	Ret	1	2	2^{P}^{F}	1^{P}^{F}	8	2	1^{F}	1^{F}	1	2	1^{F}	Ret		**118**	**1st**
1994	FW16; FW16B	Renault RS6 3.5 V10	G	(Brazil) Ayrton Senna	Ret^{P}	Ret^{P}	Ret^{P}															**118**	**1st**
1994	FW16; FW16B	Renault RS6 3.5 V10	G	(United Kingdom) David Coulthard					Ret	5		5	Ret^{F}	Ret	4	6	2^{F}					**118**	**1st**
1994	FW16; FW16B	Renault RS6 3.5 V10	G	(United Kingdom) Nigel Mansell							Ret							Ret	4	1^{P}		**118**	**1st**
1995	FW17; FW17B	Renault RS7 3.0 V10	G		BRA	ARG	SMR	ESP	MON	CAN	FRA	GBR	GER	HUN	BEL	ITA	POR	EUR	PAC	JPN	AUS	**112** (Note: Williams was not awarded constructor points for Coulthard's second place in Brazil as it was deemed to be using illegal fuel.)	**2nd**
1995	FW17; FW17B	Renault RS7 3.0 V10	G	(United Kingdom) Damon Hill	Ret^{P}	1	1	4^{F}	2^{P}	Ret	2^{P}	Ret^{P}^{F}	Ret^{P}	1^{P}^{F}	2	Ret	3	Ret	3	Ret	1^{P}^{F}	**112**	**2nd**
1995	FW17; FW17B	Renault RS7 3.0 V10	G	(United Kingdom) David Coulthard	2	Ret^{P}	4	Ret	Ret	Ret	3	3	2	2	Ret^{F}	Ret^{P}	1^{P}^{F}	3^{P}	2^{P}	Ret	Ret	**112**	**2nd**
1996	FW18	Renault RS8 3.0 V10	G		AUS	BRA	ARG	EUR	SMR	MON	ESP	CAN	FRA	GBR	GER	HUN	BEL	ITA	POR	JPN		**175**	**1st**
1996	FW18	Renault RS8 3.0 V10	G	(United Kingdom) Damon Hill	1	1^{P}^{F}	1^{P}	4^{P}^{F}	1^{F}	Ret	Ret^{P}	1^{P}	1	Ret^{P}	1^{P}^{F}	2^{F}	5	Ret^{P}	2^{P}	1		**175**	**1st**
1996	FW18	Renault RS8 3.0 V10	G	(Canada) Jacques Villeneuve	2^{P}^{F}	Ret	2	1	11	Ret	3	2^{F}	2^{F}	1^{F}	3	1	2^{P}	7	1^{F}	Ret^{P}^{F}		**175**	**1st**
1997	FW19	Renault RS9 3.0 V10	G		AUS	BRA	ARG	SMR	MON	ESP	CAN	FRA	GBR	GER	HUN	BEL	ITA	AUT	LUX	JPN	EUR	**123**	**1st**
1997	FW19	Renault RS9 3.0 V10	G	(Canada) Jacques Villeneuve	Ret^{P}	1^{P}^{F}	1^{P}	Ret^{P}	Ret	1^{P}	Ret	4	1^{P}	Ret	1	5^{P}^{F}	5	1^{P}^{F}	1	DSQ^{P}	3^{P}	**123**	**1st**
1997	FW19	Renault RS9 3.0 V10	G	(Germany) Heinz-Harald Frentzen	8^{F}	9	Ret	1^{F}	Ret^{P}	8	4	2	Ret	Ret	Ret^{F}	3	3	3	3^{F}	2^{F}	6^{F}	**123**	**1st**
1998	FW20	Mecachrome GC37-01 3.0 V10	G		AUS	BRA	ARG	SMR	ESP	MON	CAN	FRA	GBR	AUT	GER	HUN	BEL	ITA	LUX	JPN		**38**	**3rd**
1998	FW20	Mecachrome GC37-01 3.0 V10	G	(Canada) Jacques Villeneuve	5	7	Ret	4	6	5	10	4	7	6	3	3	Ret	Ret	8	6		**38**	**3rd**
1998	FW20	Mecachrome GC37-01 3.0 V10	G	(Germany) Heinz-Harald Frentzen	3	5	9	5	8	Ret	Ret	15	Ret	Ret	9	5	4	7	5	5		**38**	**3rd**
1999	FW21	Supertec FB01 3.0 V10	B		AUS	BRA	SMR	MON	ESP	CAN	FRA	GBR	AUT	GER	HUN	BEL	ITA	EUR	MAL	JPN		35	5th
1999	FW21	Supertec FB01 3.0 V10	B	(Italy) Alessandro Zanardi	Ret	Ret	11^{†}	8	Ret	Ret	Ret	11	Ret	Ret	Ret	8	7	Ret	10	Ret		35	5th
1999	FW21	Supertec FB01 3.0 V10	B	(Germany) Ralf Schumacher	3	4	Ret	Ret	5	4	4	3	Ret	4	9	5	2^{F}	4	Ret	5		35	5th

==== 2000s ====
(key)

Year	Chassis	Engine	Tyres	Drivers	1	2	3	4	5	6	7	8	9	10	11	12	13	14	15	16	17	18	19	Points	WCC
2000	FW22	BMW E41 3.0 V10	B		AUS	BRA	SMR	GBR	ESP	EUR	MON	CAN	FRA	AUT	GER	HUN	BEL	ITA	USA	JPN	MAL			**36**	**3rd**
2000	FW22	BMW E41 3.0 V10	B	(Germany) Ralf Schumacher	3	5	Ret	4	4	Ret	Ret	14^{†}	5	Ret	7	5	3	3	Ret	Ret	Ret			**36**	**3rd**
2000	FW22	BMW E41 3.0 V10	B	(United Kingdom) Jenson Button	Ret	6	Ret	5	17^{†}	10^{†}	Ret	11	8	5	4	9	5	Ret	Ret	5	Ret			**36**	**3rd**
2001	FW23	BMW P80 3.0 V10	MI		AUS	MAL	BRA	SMR	ESP	AUT	MON	CAN	EUR	FRA	GBR	GER	HUN	BEL	ITA	USA	JPN			**80**	**3rd**
2001	FW23	BMW P80 3.0 V10	MI	(Germany) Ralf Schumacher	Ret	5	Ret^{F}	1^{F}	Ret	Ret	Ret	1^{F}	4	2^{P}	Ret	1	4	7	3^{F}	Ret	6^{F}			**80**	**3rd**
2001	FW23	BMW P80 3.0 V10	MI	(Colombia) Juan Pablo Montoya	Ret	Ret	Ret	Ret	2	Ret	Ret	Ret	2^{F}	Ret	4	Ret^{P}^{F}	8	Ret^{P}	1^{P}	Ret^{F}	2			**80**	**3rd**
2002	FW24	BMW P82 3.0 V10	MI		AUS	MAL	BRA	SMR	ESP	AUT	MON	CAN	EUR	GBR	FRA	GER	HUN	BEL	ITA	USA	JPN			**92**	**2nd**
2002	FW24	BMW P82 3.0 V10	MI	(Germany) Ralf Schumacher	Ret	1	2	3	11^{†}	4	3	7	4	8	5	3	3	5	Ret	16	11^{†}			**92**	**2nd**
2002	FW24	BMW P82 3.0 V10	MI	(Colombia) Juan Pablo Montoya	2	2^{F}	5^{P}^{F}	4	2	3	Ret^{P}	Ret^{P}^{F}	Ret^{P}	3^{P}	4^{P}	2	11	3	Ret^{P}	4	4			**92**	**2nd**
2003	FW25	BMW P83 3.0 V10	MI		AUS	MAL	BRA	SMR	ESP	AUT	MON	CAN	EUR	FRA	GBR	GER	HUN	ITA	USA	JPN				**144**	**2nd**
2003	FW25	BMW P83 3.0 V10	MI	(Colombia) Juan Pablo Montoya	2	11	Ret	7	4	Ret	1	3	2	2^{F}	2	1^{P}^{F}	3^{F}	2	6	Ret				**144**	**2nd**
2003	FW25	BMW P83 3.0 V10	MI	(Germany) Ralf Schumacher	8	4	7	4	5	6	4^{P}	2^{P}	1	1^{P}	9	Ret	4	PO	Ret	12^{F}				**144**	**2nd**
2003	FW25	BMW P83 3.0 V10	MI	(Spain) Marc Gené														5						**144**	**2nd**
2004	FW26	BMW P84 3.0 V10	MI		AUS	MAL	BHR	SMR	ESP	MON	EUR	CAN	USA	FRA	GBR	GER	HUN	BEL	ITA	CHN	JPN	BRA		88	4th
2004	FW26	BMW P84 3.0 V10	MI	(Colombia) Juan Pablo Montoya	5	2^{F}	13	3	Ret	4	8	DSQ	DSQ	8	5	5	4	Ret	5	5	7	1^{F}		88	4th
2004	FW26	BMW P84 3.0 V10	MI	(Germany) Ralf Schumacher	4	Ret	7	7	6	10^{†}	Ret	DSQ^{P}	Ret							Ret	2	5		88	4th
2004	FW26	BMW P84 3.0 V10	MI	(Spain) Marc Gené										10	12									88	4th
2004	FW26	BMW P84 3.0 V10	MI	(Brazil) Antônio Pizzonia												7	7	Ret	7					88	4th
2005	FW27	BMW P84/5 3.0 V10	MI		AUS	MAL	BHR	SMR	ESP	MON	EUR	CAN	USA	FRA	GBR	GER	HUN	TUR	ITA	BEL	BRA	JPN	CHN	66	5th
2005	FW27	BMW P84/5 3.0 V10	MI	(Australia) Mark Webber	5	Ret	6	7	6	3	Ret	5	DNS	12	11	NC	7	Ret	14	4	NC	4	7	66	5th
2005	FW27	BMW P84/5 3.0 V10	MI	(Germany) Nick Heidfeld	Ret	3	Ret	6	10	2	2^{P}	Ret	DNS	14	12	11	6	Ret						66	5th
2005	FW27	BMW P84/5 3.0 V10	MI	(Brazil) Antônio Pizzonia															7	15^{†}	Ret	Ret	13^{†}	66	5th
2006	FW28	Cosworth CA2006 2.4 V8	B		BHR	MAL	AUS	SMR	EUR	ESP	MON	GBR	CAN	USA	FRA	GER	HUN	TUR	ITA	CHN	JPN	BRA		11	8th
2006	FW28	Cosworth CA2006 2.4 V8	B	(Australia) Mark Webber	6	Ret	Ret	6	Ret	9	Ret	Ret	12	Ret	Ret	Ret	Ret	10	10	8	Ret	Ret		11	8th
2006	FW28	Cosworth CA2006 2.4 V8	B	(Germany) Nico Rosberg	7^{F}	Ret	Ret	11	7	11	Ret	9	Ret	9	14	Ret	Ret	Ret	Ret	11	10	Ret		11	8th
2007	FW29	Toyota RVX-07 2.4 V8	B		AUS	MAL	BHR	ESP	MON	CAN	USA	FRA	GBR	EUR	HUN	TUR	ITA	BEL	JPN	CHN	BRA			33	4th
2007	FW29	Toyota RVX-07 2.4 V8	B	(Germany) Nico Rosberg	7	Ret	10	6	12	10	Ret	9	12	Ret	7	7	6	6	Ret	16	4			33	4th
2007	FW29	Toyota RVX-07 2.4 V8	B	(Austria) Alexander Wurz	Ret	9	11	Ret	7	3	10	14	13	4	14	11	13	Ret	Ret	12				33	4th
2007	FW29	Toyota RVX-07 2.4 V8	B	(Japan) Kazuki Nakajima																	10			33	4th
2008	FW30	Toyota RVX-08 2.4 V8	B		AUS	MAL	BHR	ESP	TUR	MON	CAN	FRA	GBR	GER	HUN	EUR	BEL	ITA	SIN	JPN	CHN	BRA		26	8th
2008	FW30	Toyota RVX-08 2.4 V8	B	(Germany) Nico Rosberg	3	14	8	Ret	8	Ret	10	16	9	10	14	8	12	14	2	11	15	12		26	8th
2008	FW30	Toyota RVX-08 2.4 V8	B	(Japan) Kazuki Nakajima	6	17	14	7	Ret	7	Ret	15	8	14	13	15	14	12	8	15	12	17		26	8th
2009	FW31	Toyota RVX-09 2.4 V8	B		AUS	MAL	CHN	BHR	ESP	MON	TUR	GBR	GER	HUN	EUR	BEL	ITA	SIN	JPN	BRA	ABU			34.5	7th
2009	FW31	Toyota RVX-09 2.4 V8	B	(Germany) Nico Rosberg	6^{F}	8^{‡}	15	9	8	6	5	5	4	4	5	8	16	11	5	Ret	9			34.5	7th
2009	FW31	Toyota RVX-09 2.4 V8	B	(Japan) Kazuki Nakajima	Ret	12	Ret	Ret	13	15^{†}	12	11	12	9	18^{†}	13	10	9	15	Ret	13			34.5	7th

==== 2010s ====
(key)

Year	Chassis	Engine	Tyres	Drivers	1	2	3	4	5	6	7	8	9	10	11	12	13	14	15	16	17	18	19	20	21	Points	WCC
2010	FW32	Cosworth CA2010 2.4 V8	B		BHR	AUS	MAL	CHN	ESP	MON	TUR	CAN	EUR	GBR	GER	HUN	BEL	ITA	SIN	JPN	KOR	BRA	ABU			69	6th
2010	FW32	Cosworth CA2010 2.4 V8	B	(Brazil) Rubens Barrichello	10	8	12	12	9	Ret	14	14	4	5	12	10	Ret	10	6	9	7	14	12			69	6th
2010	FW32	Cosworth CA2010 2.4 V8	B	(Germany) Nico Hülkenberg	14	Ret	10	15	16	Ret	17	13	Ret	10	13	6	14	7	10	Ret	10	8^{P}	16			69	6th
2011	FW33	Cosworth CA2011 2.4 V8	P		AUS	MAL	CHN	TUR	ESP	MON	CAN	EUR	GBR	GER	HUN	BEL	ITA	SIN	JPN	KOR	IND	ABU	BRA			5	9th
2011	FW33	Cosworth CA2011 2.4 V8	P	(Brazil) Rubens Barrichello	Ret	Ret	13	15	17	9	9	12	13	Ret	13	16	12	13	17	12	15	12	14			5	9th
2011	FW33	Cosworth CA2011 2.4 V8	P	(Venezuela) Pastor Maldonado	Ret	Ret	18	17	15	18^{†}	Ret	18	14	14	16	10	11	11	14	Ret	Ret	14	Ret			5	9th
2012	FW34	Renault RS27-2012 2.4 V8	P		AUS	MAL	CHN	BHR	ESP	MON	CAN	EUR	GBR	GER	HUN	BEL	ITA	SIN	JPN	KOR	IND	ABU	USA	BRA		76	8th
2012	FW34	Renault RS27-2012 2.4 V8	P	(Venezuela) Pastor Maldonado	13^{†}	19^{†}	8	Ret	1^{P}	Ret	13	12	16	15	13	Ret	11	Ret	8	14	16	5	9	Ret		76	8th
2012	FW34	Renault RS27-2012 2.4 V8	P	(Brazil) Bruno Senna	16^{†}	6	7	22^{†}	Ret	10	17	10	9	17	7	12^{F}	10	18^{†}	14	15	10	8	10	Ret		76	8th
2013	FW35	Renault RS27-2013 2.4 V8	P		AUS	MAL	CHN	BHR	ESP	MON	CAN	GBR	GER	HUN	BEL	ITA	SIN	KOR	JPN	IND	ABU	USA	BRA			5	9th
2013	FW35	Renault RS27-2013 2.4 V8	P	(Finland) Valtteri Bottas	14	11	13	14	16	12	14	12	16	Ret	15	15	13	12	17	16	15	8	Ret			5	9th
2013	FW35	Renault RS27-2013 2.4 V8	P	(Venezuela) Pastor Maldonado	Ret	Ret	14	11	14	Ret	16	11	15	10	17	14	11	13	16	12	11	17	16			5	9th
2014	FW36	Mercedes PU106A Hybrid 1.6 V6 t	P		AUS	MAL	BHR	CHN	ESP	MON	CAN	AUT	GBR	GER	HUN	BEL	ITA	SIN	JPN	RUS	USA	BRA	ABU			**320**	**3rd**
2014	FW36	Mercedes PU106A Hybrid 1.6 V6 t	P	(Finland) Valtteri Bottas	5	8	8	7	5	Ret	7	3	2	2	8	3	4	11	6	3^{F}	5	10	3			**320**	**3rd**
2014	FW36	Mercedes PU106A Hybrid 1.6 V6 t	P	(Brazil) Felipe Massa	Ret	7	7	15	13	7	12^{F}^{†}	4^{P}	Ret	Ret	5	13	3	5	7	11	4	3	2			**320**	**3rd**
2015	FW37	Mercedes PU106B Hybrid 1.6 V6 t	P		AUS	MAL	CHN	BHR	ESP	MON	CAN	AUT	GBR	HUN	BEL	ITA	SIN	JPN	RUS	USA	MEX	BRA	ABU			**257**	**3rd**
2015	FW37	Mercedes PU106B Hybrid 1.6 V6 t	P	(Finland) Valtteri Bottas	DNS	5	6	4	4	14	3	5	5	13	9	4	5	5	12^{†}	Ret	3	5	13			**257**	**3rd**
2015	FW37	Mercedes PU106B Hybrid 1.6 V6 t	P	(Brazil) Felipe Massa	4	6	5	10	6	15	6	3	4	12	6	3	Ret	17	4	Ret	6	DSQ	8			**257**	**3rd**
2016	FW38	Mercedes PU106C Hybrid 1.6 V6 t	P		AUS	BHR	CHN	RUS	ESP	MON	CAN	EUR	AUT	GBR	HUN	GER	BEL	ITA	SIN	MAL	JPN	USA	MEX	BRA	ABU	138	5th
2016	FW38	Mercedes PU106C Hybrid 1.6 V6 t	P	(Finland) Valtteri Bottas	8	9	10	4	5	12	3	6	9	14	9	9	8	6	Ret	5	10	16	8	11	Ret	138	5th
2016	FW38	Mercedes PU106C Hybrid 1.6 V6 t	P	(Brazil) Felipe Massa	5	8	6	5	8	10	Ret	10	20^{†}	11	18	Ret	10	9	12	13	9	7	9	Ret	9	138	5th
2017	FW40	Mercedes M08 EQ Power+ 1.6 V6 t	P		AUS	CHN	BHR	RUS	ESP	MON	CAN	AZE	AUT	GBR	HUN	BEL	ITA	SIN	MAL	JPN	USA	MEX	BRA	ABU		83	5th
2017	FW40	Mercedes M08 EQ Power+ 1.6 V6 t	P	(Brazil) Felipe Massa	6	14	6	9	13	9	Ret	Ret	9	10	WD	8	8	11	9	10	9	11	7	10		83	5th
2017	FW40	Mercedes M08 EQ Power+ 1.6 V6 t	P	(Canada) Lance Stroll	Ret	Ret	Ret	11	16	15^{†}	9	3	10	16	14	11	7	8	8	Ret	11	6	16	18		83	5th
2017	FW40	Mercedes M08 EQ Power+ 1.6 V6 t	P	(United Kingdom) Paul di Resta											Ret											83	5th
2018	FW41	Mercedes M09 EQ Power+ 1.6 V6 t	P		AUS	BHR	CHN	AZE	ESP	MON	CAN	FRA	AUT	GBR	GER	HUN	BEL	ITA	SIN	RUS	JPN	USA	MEX	BRA	ABU	7	10th
2018	FW41	Mercedes M09 EQ Power+ 1.6 V6 t	P	(Russia) Sergey Sirotkin	Ret	15	15	Ret	14	16	17	15	13	14	Ret	16	12	10	19	18	16	13	13	16	15	7	10th
2018	FW41	Mercedes M09 EQ Power+ 1.6 V6 t	P	(Canada) Lance Stroll	14	14	14	8	11	17	Ret	17^{†}	14	12	Ret	17	13	9	14	15	17	14	12	18	13	7	10th
2019	FW42	Mercedes M10 EQ Power+ 1.6 V6 t	P		AUS	BHR	CHN	AZE	ESP	MON	CAN	FRA	AUT	GBR	GER	HUN	BEL	ITA	SIN	RUS	JPN	MEX	USA	BRA	ABU	1	10th
2019	FW42	Mercedes M10 EQ Power+ 1.6 V6 t	P	(Poland) Robert Kubica	17	16	17	16	18	18	18	18	20	15	10	19	17	17	16	Ret	17	18	Ret	16	19	1	10th
2019	FW42	Mercedes M10 EQ Power+ 1.6 V6 t	P	(United Kingdom) George Russell	16	15	16	15	17	15	16	19	18	14	11	16	15	14	Ret	Ret	16	16	17	12	17	1	10th

==== 2020s ====
Key

Key
Colour	Result
Gold	Winner
Silver	Second place
Bronze	Third place
Green	Other points position
Blue	Other classified position
Blue	Not classified, finished (NC)
Purple	Not classified, retired (Ret)
Red	Did not qualify (DNQ)
Black	Disqualified (DSQ)
White	Did not start (DNS)
White	Race cancelled (C)
Blank	Did not practice (DNP)
Blank	Excluded (EX)
Blank	Did not arrive (DNA)
Blank	Withdrawn (WD)
Blank	Did not enter (empty cell)
Annotation	Meaning
P	Pole position
F	Fastest lap
Superscript number	Points-scoring position in sprint

Year	Chassis	Engine	Tyres	Drivers	1	2	3	4	5	6	7	8	9	10	11	12	13	14	15	16	17	18	19	20	21	22	23	24	Points	WCC
2020	FW43	Mercedes M11 EQ Performance 1.6 V6 t	P		AUT	STY	HUN	GBR	70A	ESP	BEL	ITA	TUS	RUS	EIF	POR	EMI	TUR	BHR	SKH	ABU								0	10th
2020	FW43	Mercedes M11 EQ Performance 1.6 V6 t	P	(Canada) Nicholas Latifi	11	17	19	15	19	18	16	11	Ret	16	14	18	11	Ret	14	Ret	17								0	10th
2020	FW43	Mercedes M11 EQ Performance 1.6 V6 t	P	(United Kingdom) George Russell	Ret	16	18	12	18	17	Ret	14	11	18	Ret	14	Ret	16	12		15								0	10th
2020	FW43	Mercedes M11 EQ Performance 1.6 V6 t	P	(United Kingdom) Jack Aitken																16									0	10th
2021	FW43B	Mercedes M12 E Performance 1.6 V6 t	P		BHR	EMI	POR	ESP	MON	AZE	FRA	STY	AUT	GBR	HUN	BEL	NED	ITA	RUS	TUR	USA	MXC	SAP	QAT	SAU	ABU			23	8th
2021	FW43B	Mercedes M12 E Performance 1.6 V6 t	P	(Canada) Nicholas Latifi	18†	Ret	18	16	15	16	18	17	16	14	7	9^{‡}	16	11	19†	17	15	17	16	Ret	12	Ret			23	8th
2021	FW43B	Mercedes M12 E Performance 1.6 V6 t	P	(United Kingdom) George Russell	14	Ret	16	14	14	17†	12	Ret	11	12	8	2^{‡}	17†	9	10	15	14	16	13	17	Ret	Ret			23	8th
2022	FW44	Mercedes M13 E Performance 1.6 V6 t	P		BHR	SAU	AUS	EMI	MIA	ESP	MON	AZE	CAN	GBR	AUT	FRA	HUN	BEL	NED	ITA	SIN	JPN	USA	MXC	SAP	ABU			8	10th
2022	FW44	Mercedes M13 E Performance 1.6 V6 t	P	(Thailand) Alexander Albon	13	14†	10	11	9	18	Ret	12	13	Ret	12	13	17	10	12	WD	Ret	Ret	13	12	15	13			8	10th
2022	FW44	Mercedes M13 E Performance 1.6 V6 t	P	(Canada) Nicholas Latifi	16	Ret	16	16	14	16	15	15	16	12	Ret	Ret	18	18	18	15	Ret	9	17	18	16	19†			8	10th
2022	FW44	Mercedes M13 E Performance 1.6 V6 t	P	(Netherlands) Nyck de Vries																9									8	10th
2023	FW45	Mercedes M14 E Performance 1.6 V6 t	P		BHR	SAU	AUS	AZE	MIA	MON	ESP	CAN	AUT	GBR	HUN	BEL	NED	ITA	SIN	JPN	QAT	USA	MXC	SAP	LVG	ABU			28	7th
2023	FW45	Mercedes M14 E Performance 1.6 V6 t	P	(Thailand) Alexander Albon	10	Ret	Ret	12	14	14	16	7	11	8	11	14	8	7	11	Ret	13^{7}	9	9	Ret	12	14			28	7th
2023	FW45	Mercedes M14 E Performance 1.6 V6 t	P	(United States) Logan Sargeant	12	16	16†	16	20	18	20	Ret	13	11	18†	17	Ret	13	14	Ret	Ret	10	16†	11	16	16			28	7th
2024	FW46	Mercedes M15 E Performance 1.6 V6 t	P		BHR	SAU	AUS	JPN	CHN	MIA	EMI	MON	CAN	ESP	AUT	GBR	HUN	BEL	NED	ITA	AZE	SIN	USA	MXC	SAP	LVG	QAT	ABU	17	9th
2024	FW46	Mercedes M15 E Performance 1.6 V6 t	P	(Thailand) Alexander Albon	15	11	11	Ret	12	18	Ret	9	Ret	18	15	9	14	12	14	9	7	Ret	16	Ret	DNS	Ret	15	11	17	9th
2024	FW46	Mercedes M15 E Performance 1.6 V6 t	P	(United States) Logan Sargeant	20	14	WD	17	17	Ret	17	15	Ret	20	19	11	17	17	16										17	9th
2024	FW46	Mercedes M15 E Performance 1.6 V6 t	P	(Argentina) Franco Colapinto																12	8	11	10	12	Ret	14	Ret	Ret	17	9th
2025	FW47	Mercedes M16 E Performance 1.6 V6 t	P		AUS	CHN	JPN	BHR	SAU	MIA	EMI	MON	ESP	CAN	AUT	GBR	BEL	HUN	NED	ITA	AZE	SIN	USA	MXC	SAP	LVG	QAT	ABU	137	5th
2025	FW47	Mercedes M16 E Performance 1.6 V6 t	P	(Thailand) Alexander Albon	5	7	9	12	9	5	5	9	Ret	Ret	Ret	8	6	15	5	7	13	14	14^{6}	12	11^{F}	Ret	11	16	137	5th
2025	FW47	Mercedes M16 E Performance 1.6 V6 t	P	(Spain) Carlos Sainz Jr.	Ret	10	14	Ret	8	9	8	10	14	10	DNS	12	18^{6}	14	13	11	3	10	Ret^{3}	17†	13	5	3^{8}	13	137	5th
2026	FW48	Mercedes 1.6 V6 t	P		AUS	CHN	JPN	MIA	CAN	MON	BCN	AUT	GBR	BEL	HUN	NED	ITA	ESP	AZE	BHR	SIN	USA	MXC	SAP	LVG	QAT	ABU		11*	9th*
2026	FW48	Mercedes 1.6 V6 t	P	(Thailand) Alexander Albon	12	DNS	20	10	Ret	8	NC	17	Ret	15	17	17†													11*	9th*
2026	FW48	Mercedes 1.6 V6 t	P	(Spain) Carlos Sainz Jr.	15	9	15	9	9	16†	12	Ret	17	16	18	16													11*	9th*

Notes

- * – Season still in progress.
- ^{†} – Driver failed to finish the race, but was classified as they had completed greater than 90% of the race distance.
- ^{‡} – Half points awarded as less than 75% of race distance was completed.

=== Results of other Williams cars ===
(key) (results in bold indicate pole position; results in italics indicate fastest lap)

Year	Entrant	Chassis	Engine	Tyres	Drivers	1	2	3	4	5	6	7	8	9	10	11	12	13	14
1980	Brands Hatch Racing	FW07	Ford Cosworth DFV 3.0 V8	**G**		ARG	BRA	RSA	USW	BEL	MON	FRA	GBR	GER	AUT	NED	ITA	CAN	USA
1980	Brands Hatch Racing	FW07	Ford Cosworth DFV 3.0 V8	**G**	(South Africa) Desiré Wilson								DNQ						
1980	RAM Racing	FW07	Ford Cosworth DFV 3.0 V8	**G**	(United Kingdom) Rupert Keegan								11	DNQ	15	DNQ	11	DNQ	9
1980	RAM Racing	FW07	Ford Cosworth DFV 3.0 V8	**G**	(United States) Kevin Cogan													DNQ	
1980	RAM Racing	FW07	Ford Cosworth DFV 3.0 V8	**G**	(United Kingdom) Geoff Lees														DNQ

== Formula One non-championship race results ==
(key) (results in bold indicate pole position; results in italics indicate fastest lap)

Year	Chassis	Engine	Tyres	Drivers	1	2	3
1979	FW07	Ford Cosworth DFV 3.0 V8	G		ROC	GNM	DIN
1979	FW07	Ford Cosworth DFV 3.0 V8	G	(Australia) Alan Jones		1	
1980	FW07B	Ford Cosworth DFV 3.0 V8	G		ESP		
1980	FW07B	Ford Cosworth DFV 3.0 V8	G	(Australia) Alan Jones	1		
1980	FW07B	Ford Cosworth DFV 3.0 V8	G	(Argentina) Carlos Reutemann	Ret		
1981	FW07B	Ford Cosworth DFV 3.0 V8	G		RSA		
1981	FW07B	Ford Cosworth DFV 3.0 V8	G	(Australia) Alan Jones	Ret		
1981	FW07B	Ford Cosworth DFV 3.0 V8	G	(Argentina) Carlos Reutemann	1		
1983	FW08C	Ford Cosworth DFV 3.0 V8	G		ROC		
1983	FW08C	Ford Cosworth DFV 3.0 V8	G	(Finland) Keke Rosberg	**1**		
