= Williams FW35 =

Formula One racing car

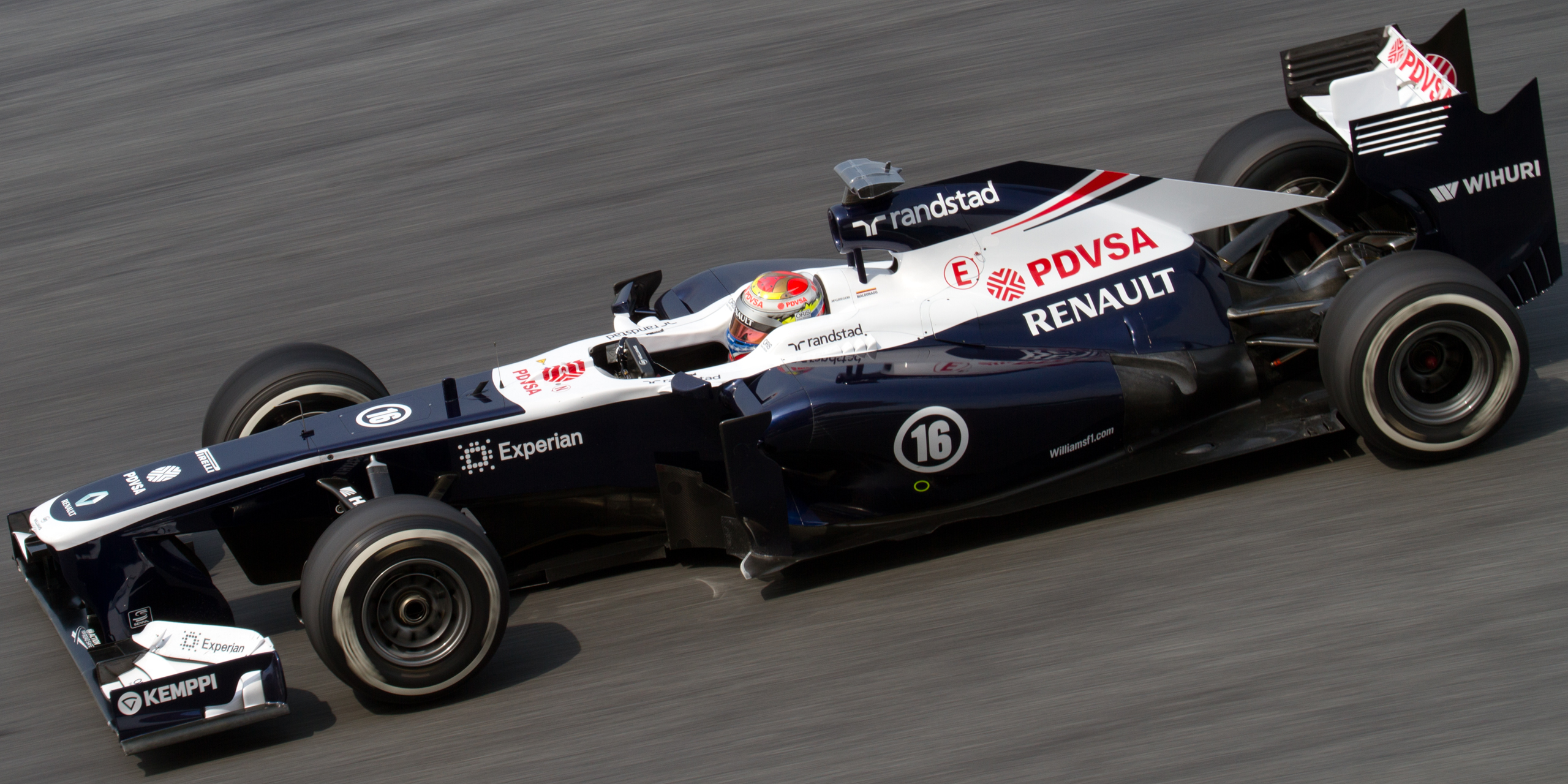
- Pastor Maldonado driving the FW35 at the Malaysian Grand Prix
- Category: Formula One
- Constructor: Williams
- Designers: Mike Coughlan (Technical Director); Ed Wood (Chief Designer); Clive Cooper (Head of Design - Composites and Structures); Christopher Brawn (Head of Design - Suspension, Steering, Breaks); Mark Loasby (Head of Design - Systems); Richard Ashford (Head of Design - Transmission); Jason Somerville (Head of Aerodynamics)
- Predecessor: Williams FW34
- Successor: Williams FW36

Technical specifications
- Chassis: Monocoque construction laminated from carbon epoxy and honeycomb surpassing FIA impact and strength requirements
- Suspension (front): Double wishbone, push-rod activated springs and anti-roll bar
- Suspension (rear): Double wishbone, pull-rod activated springs and anti-roll bar
- Engine: Renault RS27-2013 2.4 L (146 cu in) V8 (90°). Naturally aspirated, 18,000 RPM limited with KERS, mid-mounted.
- Transmission: Williams F1 seven speed seamless sequential semi-automatic shift plus reverse gear, gear selection electro-hydraulically actuated
- Weight: 642 kg (1,415.4 lb) (with driver)
- Fuel: Total Excellium with ATL Kevlar-reinforced rubber bladder fuel system
- Tyres: Pirelli P Zero (dry), Cinturato (wet); RAYS forged magnesium wheels

Competition history
- Notable entrants: Williams F1 Team
- Notable drivers: 16. (Venezuela) Pastor Maldonado; 17. (Finland) Valtteri Bottas
- Debut: 2013 Australian Grand Prix
- Last event: 2013 Brazilian Grand Prix
| Races | Wins | Podiums | Poles | F/Laps |
|---|---|---|---|---|
| 19 | 0 | 0 | 0 | 0 |

The Williams FW35 was a Formula One racing car designed and built by the Williams team for use in the 2013 Formula One season. It was driven by Pastor Maldonado and 2011 GP3 Series champion Valtteri Bottas in his Formula One debut.

== Launch, engine and testing ==
The car was launched on 19 February at the Circuit de Catalunya in Barcelona, Spain, with the team using an interim version of the FW34 for the first test in Jerez de la Frontera. This was also the team's last season using a Renault engine before a new long term deal with Mercedes was activated for 2014.

== Competition history ==
The FW35 was faced with a difficult debut when the Fédération Internationale de l'Automobile declared its exhaust system to be illegal the day the car was launched, forcing the team to revise design. Despite this setback, Pastor Maldonado and Valtteri Bottas declared themselves to be happy with the development of the car after completing its winter testing programme.

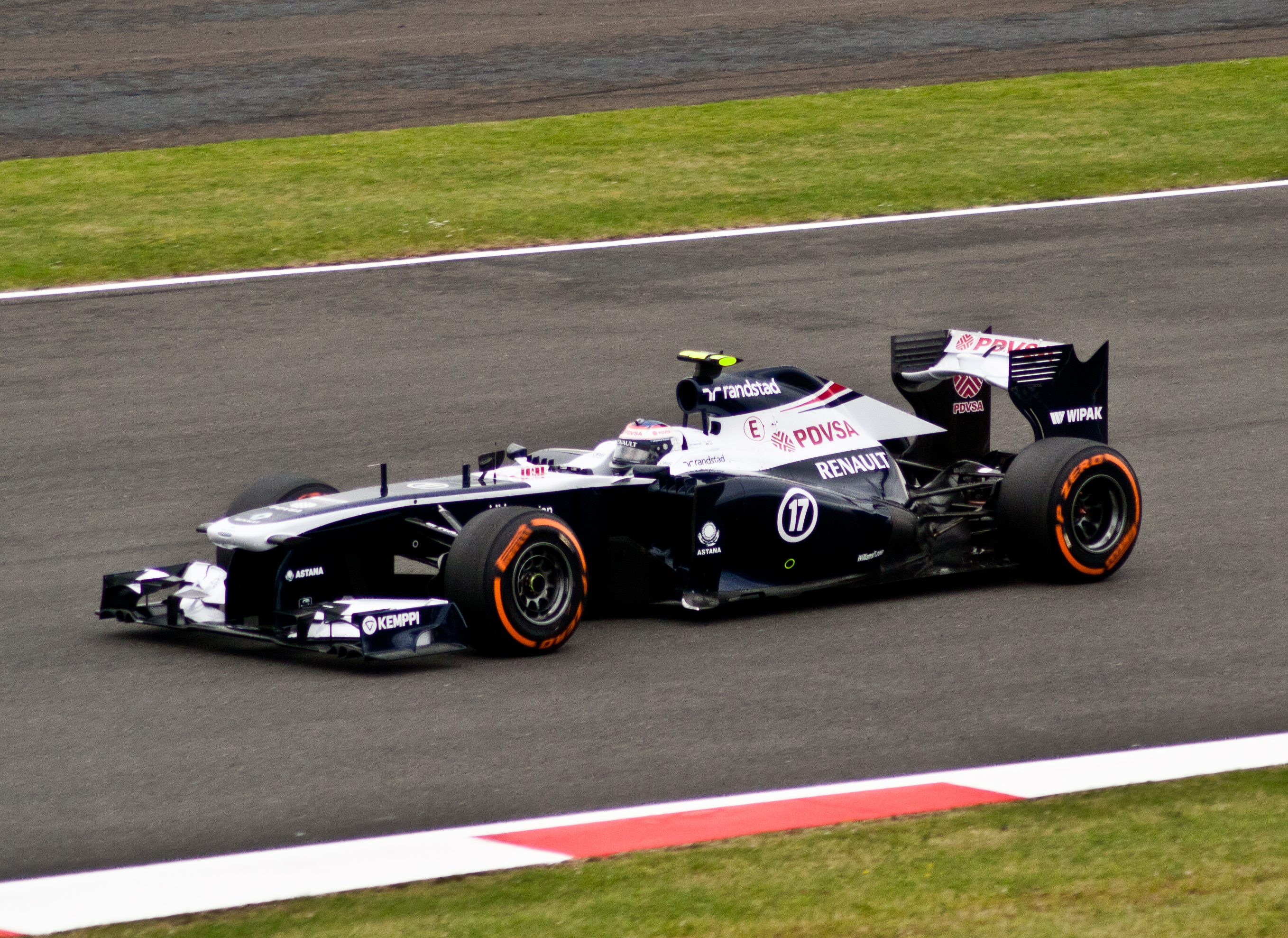
Bottas at Williams' home race, the British Grand Prix

However, the scheduled updates that the team introduced for the first race in Australia did not work as planned, with Maldonado declaring the car to be "undriveable", and that the team had set themselves back three years, though he did acknowledge that his struggles with the car may have been down to a combination of the characteristics of the Melbourne Grand Prix Circuit and the team's inability to find a proper car setup for the extreme conditions experienced over the race weekend. Nevertheless, the team made the decision to revert the FW35 back to its launch specification before the race.

2013 was a massive disaster for the team, similar to 2011. The team was eliminated in Q1 mostly along with Marussia and Caterham, and failed to score a point until Hungary, when Maldonado finished 10th. Bottas, on the other hand, qualified an impressive third in Canada, but could only finish 14th, and he failed to score a point until Austin, when he finished 8th. The team finished 9th in the Constructors’ Championship, with 5 points, their equal-worst season.

== Livery ==
The livery are almost identical to the previous season with a subtle changes. PDVSA was retained for the third and final year until Maldonado moved to Lotus the following season. As Bottas joined the team, he brought the Finnish welding equipment company Kemppi.

At the German Grand Prix, Williams celebrated their 600th Grand Prix entries; the logo was present on the sidepods.

== Complete Formula One results ==
(key) (results in bold indicate pole position; results in italics indicate fastest lap)

| Year | Entrant | Engine | Tyres | Drivers | Grands Prix | | | | | | | | | | | | | | | | | | | Points | WCC |
| Year | Entrant | Engine | Tyres | Drivers | AUS | MAL | CHN | BHR | ESP | MON | CAN | GBR | GER | HUN | BEL | ITA | SIN | KOR | JPN | IND | ABU | USA | BRA | Points | WCC |
|---|---|---|---|---|---|---|---|---|---|---|---|---|---|---|---|---|---|---|---|---|---|---|---|---|---|
| 2013 | Williams F1 Team | Renault RS27-2013 | **P** | Pastor Maldonado | Ret | Ret | 14 | 11 | 14 | Ret | 16 | 11 | 15 | 10 | 17 | 14 | 11 | 13 | 16 | 12 | 11 | 17 | 16 | **5** | **9th** |
| 2013 | Williams F1 Team | Renault RS27-2013 | **P** | Valtteri Bottas | 14 | 11 | 13 | 14 | 16 | 12 | 14 | 12 | 16 | Ret | 15 | 15 | 13 | 12 | 17 | 16 | 15 | 8 | Ret | **5** | **9th** |
