= Williams FW36 =

Racing car

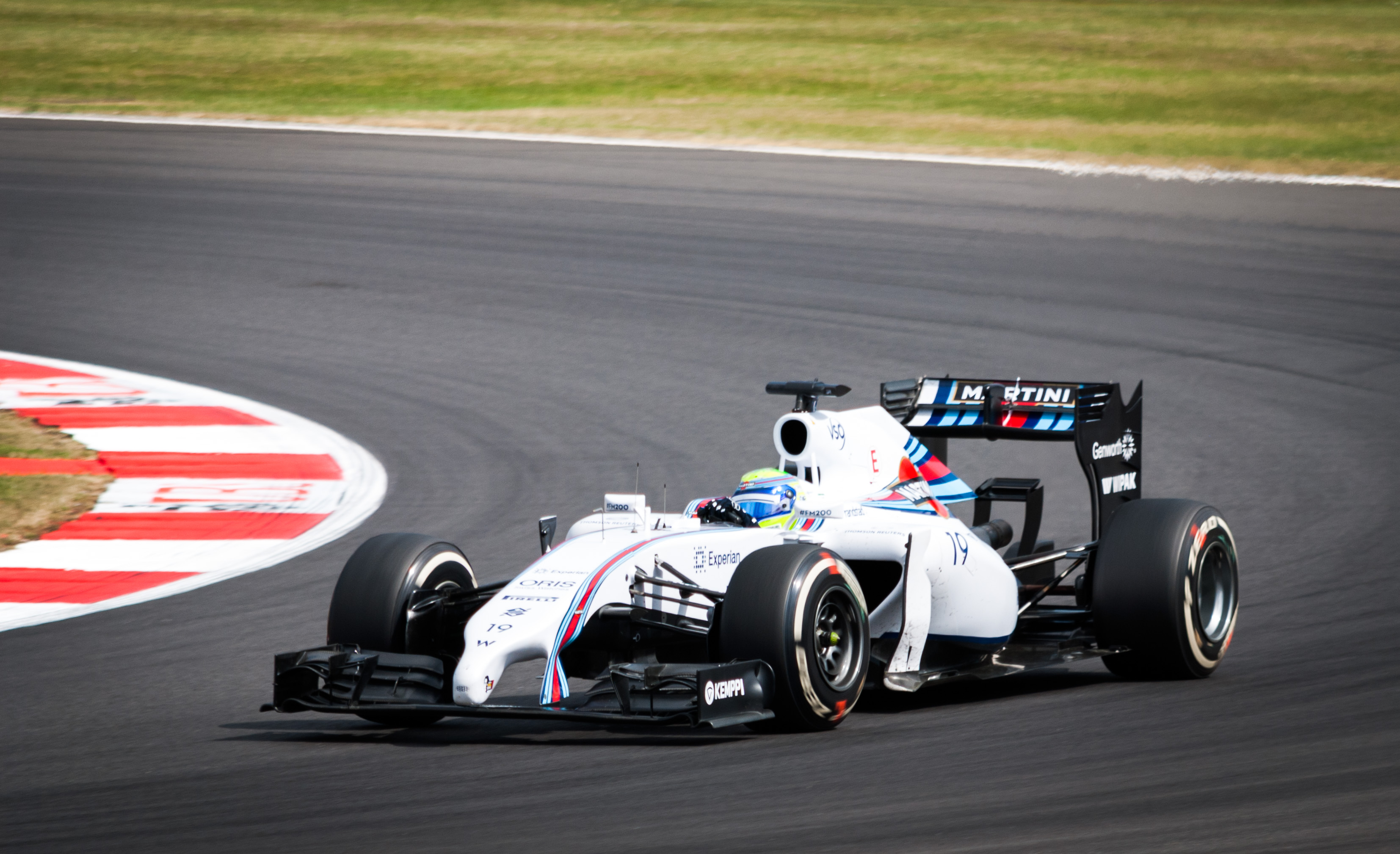
- Felipe Massa at the British Grand Prix
- Category: Formula One
- Constructor: Williams
- Designers: Pat Symonds (Chief Technical Officer); Ed Wood (Chief Designer); Clive Cooper (Head of Design - Composites and Structures); Christopher Brawn (Head of Design - Suspension, Steering, Brakes); Mark Loasby (Head of Design - Systems); Richard Ashford (Head of Design - Transmission); Jakob Andreasen (Chief Performance & Operations Engineer); Jason Somerville (Head of Aerodynamics); David Wheater (Head of Aerodynamic Performance)
- Predecessor: Williams FW35
- Successor: Williams FW37

Technical specifications
- Chassis: Monocoque construction laminated from carbon epoxy and honeycomb
- Suspension (front): Double wishbone, push-rod activated springs and anti-roll bar
- Suspension (rear): Double wishbone, pull-rod activated springs and anti-roll bar
- Engine: Mercedes PU106A Hybrid Turbo 1.6 L (98 cu in) V6 (90°), 15,000 RPM limited , in a mid-mounted, rear-wheel drive layout
- Electric motor: Mercedes PU106A Hybrid Motor Generator Unit–Kinetic (MGU-K) Mercedes PU106A Hybrid Motor Generator Unit–Heat (MGU-H)
- Transmission: Williams eight forward speeds and one reverse, seamless sequential shift semi-automatic gearbox, with gear selection electro-hydraulically actuated
- Weight: 691 kg (1,523.4 lb) (with driver)
- Fuel: Petronas
- Tyres: Pirelli P Zero (dry), Cinturato (wet)

Competition history
- Notable entrants: Williams Martini Racing
- Notable drivers: 19. (Brazil) Felipe Massa; 77. (Finland) Valtteri Bottas
- Debut: 2014 Australian Grand Prix
- Last event: 2014 Abu Dhabi Grand Prix
Races	Wins	Podiums	Poles	F/Laps
19	0	9	1	2

The Williams FW36 is a Formula One racing car designed by Williams Grand Prix Engineering to compete in the 2014 Formula One season. It was driven by Valtteri Bottas and Felipe Massa, who replaced the departing Pastor Maldonado.

== Background and design ==
The FW36 was the first car built by Williams to use a Mercedes engine, a 1.6-litre V6 turbocharged unit, known as the PU106A Hybrid.

A computer-generated rendering of the car was released on 23 January, showing an extended nosecone dubbed the "anteater".

The FW36 was the first turbo powered Formula One car designed and raced by Williams since the Honda powered FW11B which carried Nelson Piquet and Nigel Mansell to first and second places respectively in the 1987 World Championship.

== Competition history ==
The car immediately proved to be more competitive than its predecessor, consistently setting the quickest times in preseason testing. It was particularly fast in a straight line, thanks in part to the Mercedes power unit and in part to its low-drag design. At the first race in Australia, the car proved to be unstable in mixed conditions, but both drivers made it into Q3. In the race, Massa was taken out at the first turn but Bottas finished sixth – later promoted to fifth – despite a grid penalty and clipping the wall and cutting a tyre ten laps in.

Following a string of bad luck (particularly affecting Massa), the cars became more competitive after Canada, and especially in Austria, where they took a surprise 1–2 in qualifying with Massa on pole. This upturn in performance continued with Bottas finishing third in Austria, Belgium and Russia and second in Great Britain and Germany, Massa taking third in Italy and Brazil and both drivers scoring Williams's first double podium since the 2005 Monaco Grand Prix in Abu Dhabi. The team scored 320 constructors' points in 2014, compared to 5 in 2013, this secured them 3rd in the Constructors' Championship, 104 points ahead of Ferrari. The car was arguably the second fastest on the grid towards the end of the season as shown by the 2-3 in Abu Dhabi by Massa and Bottas respectively.

== Sponsorship and livery ==
The car sported the Martini Racing livery after securing title sponsorship from Martini & Rossi. It became the first Formula One car to wear this livery since the Lotus 80 in 1979. However, alcohol laws meant Williams could not use their red Martini stripes in Abu Dhabi, instead using a blue livery.

At the British Grand Prix, Massa drove the 200th race of his career, and the number 200 was displayed on his helmet.

== Aftermath ==
In September 2020, before the start of the 2020 Italian Grand Prix, Claire Williams was given a signed front wing from the car as a souvenir from her Williams colleagues. The front wing was signed by everyone who worked at Williams.

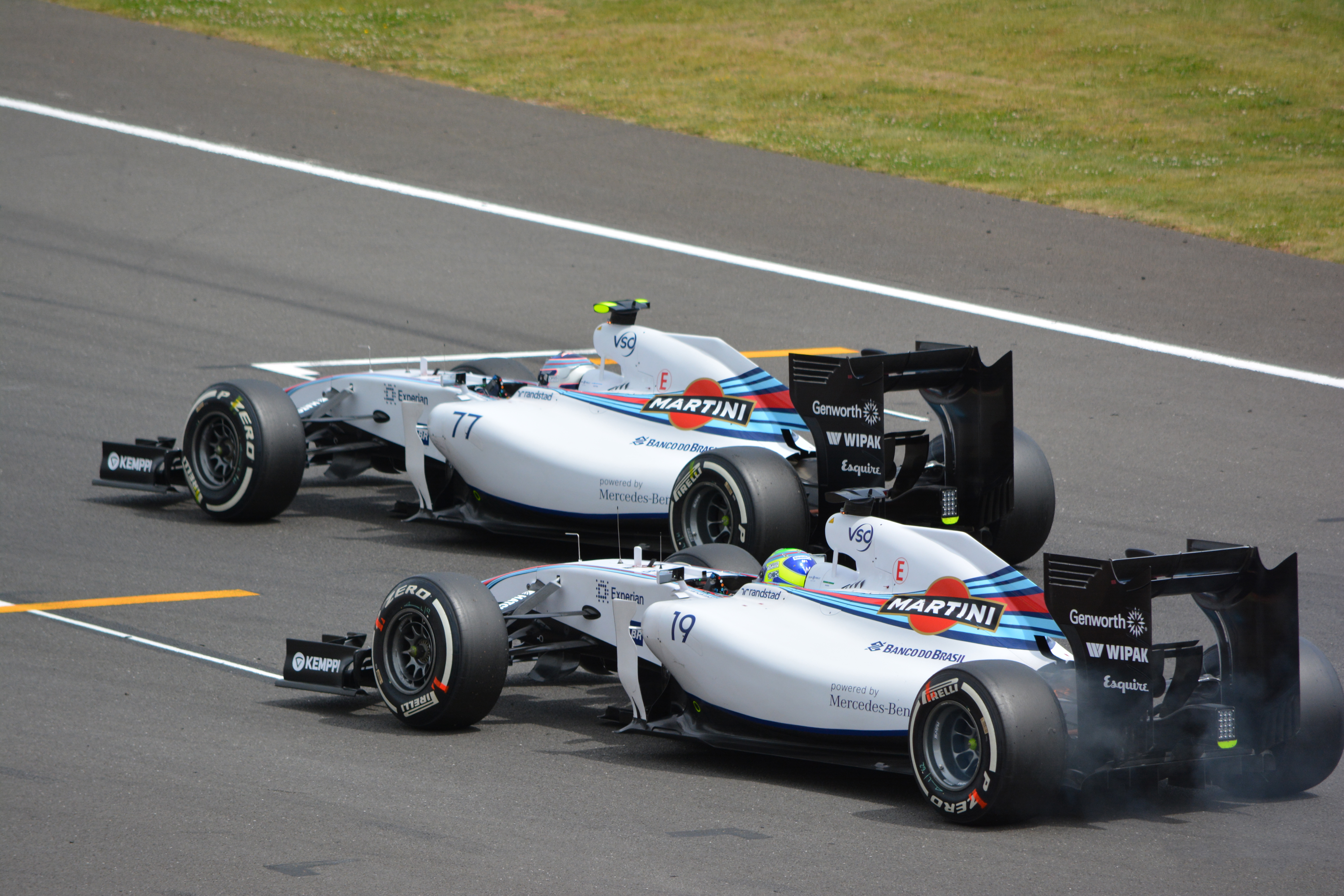
Felipe Massa following Valtteri Bottas at the 2014 British Grand Prix

== Complete Formula One results ==
(key) (results in bold indicate pole position; results in italics indicate fastest lap)

Year	Entrant	Engine	Tyres	Drivers	1	2	3	4	5	6	7	8	9	10	11	12	13	14	15	16	17	18	19	Pts	WCC
2014	Williams Martini Racing	Mercedes PU106A Hybrid	**P**		AUS	MAL	BHR	CHN	ESP	MON	CAN	AUT	GBR	GER	HUN	BEL	ITA	SIN	JPN	RUS	USA	BRA	ABU‡	**320**	**3rd**
2014	Williams Martini Racing	Mercedes PU106A Hybrid	**P**	Felipe Massa	Ret	7	7	15	13	7	12†	**4**	Ret	Ret	5	13	3	5	7	11	4	3	2	**320**	**3rd**
2014	Williams Martini Racing	Mercedes PU106A Hybrid	**P**	Valtteri Bottas	5	8	8	7	5	Ret	7	3	2	2	8	3	4	11	6	3	5	10	3	**320**	**3rd**

† — Driver failed to finish the race, but was classified as they had completed greater than 90% of the race distance.
‡ — Teams and drivers scored double points at the Abu Dhabi Grand Prix.
