= Williams FW34 =

Formula One Car for 2012 season

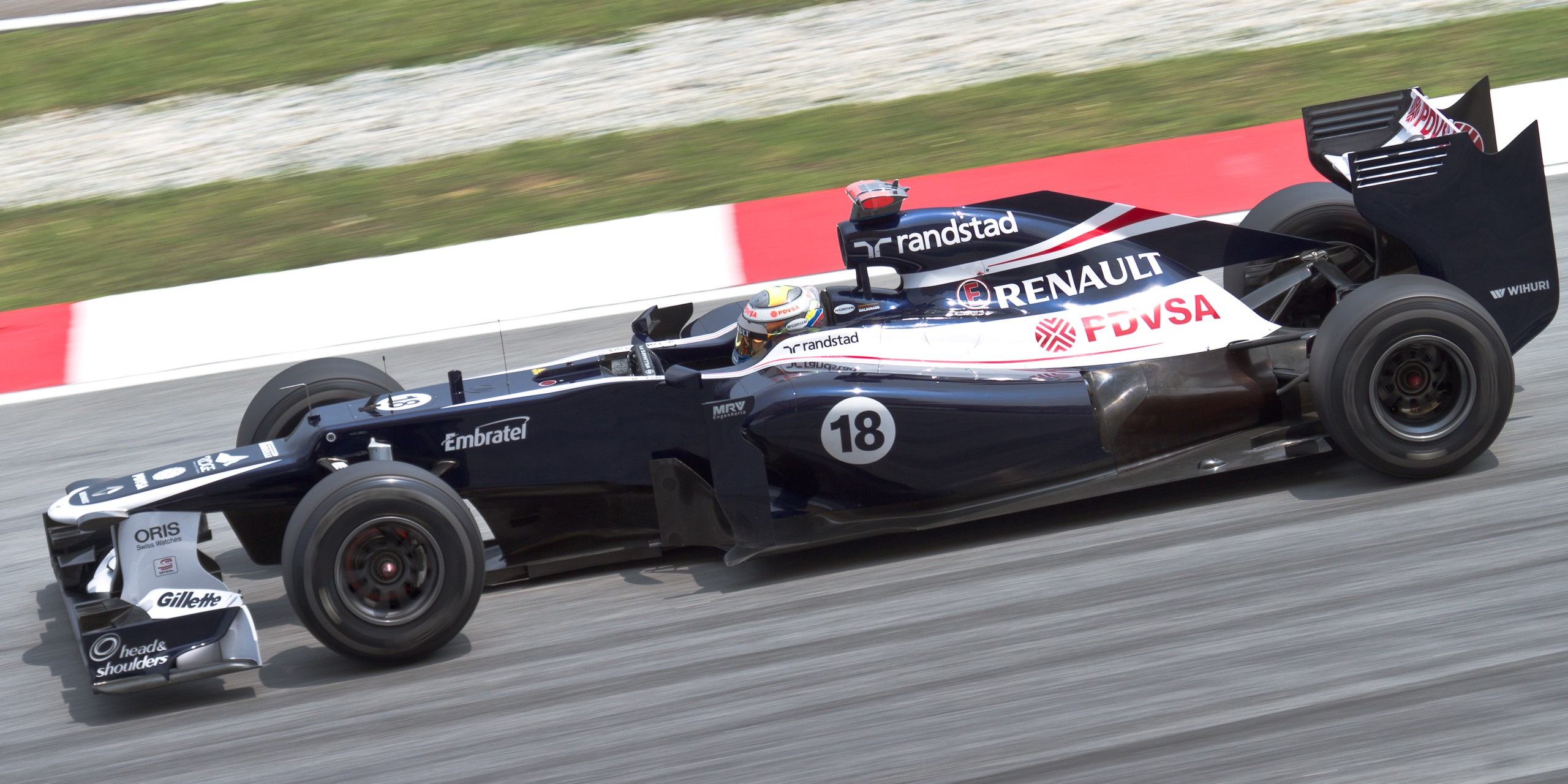
- Pastor Maldonado driving the FW34 at the Malaysian Grand Prix
- Category: Formula One
- Constructor: Williams
- Designers: Mike Coughlan (Technical Director); Ed Wood (Chief Designer); Clive Cooper (Head of Design - Composites and Structures); Christopher Brawn (Head of Design - Suspension, Steering, Breaks); Mark Loasby (Head of Design - Systems); Jason Somerville (Head of Aerodynamics)
- Predecessor: Williams FW33
- Successor: Williams FW35

Technical specifications
- Chassis: Carbon-fibre and honeycomb composite monocoque
- Suspension (front): Double wishbone, push-rod activated springs and anti-roll bar
- Suspension (rear): Double wishbone, pull-rod activated springs and anti-roll bar
- Engine: Renault RS27-2012 2.4 L (146 cu in) V8 naturally aspirated mid-mounted
- Transmission: Williams F1 seven speed seamless sequential semi-automatic shift plus reverse gear, gear selection electro-hydraulically actuated
- Weight: 640 kg (1,411.0 lb) (with driver)
- Fuel: Total
- Tyres: Pirelli P Zero (dry), Cinturato (wet); RAYS forged magnesium wheels (front and rear): 13"

Competition history
- Notable entrants: Williams F1 Team
- Notable drivers: 18. (Venezuela) Pastor Maldonado; 19. (Brazil) Bruno Senna
- Debut: 2012 Australian Grand Prix
- First win: 2012 Spanish Grand Prix
- Last win: 2012 Spanish Grand Prix
- Last event: 2012 Brazilian Grand Prix
Races	Wins	Podiums	Poles	F/Laps
20	1	1	1	1

The Williams FW34 was a Formula One racing car designed by Williams F1 for the 2012 Formula One season. As of 2026, it is the most recent Williams car to win a race.

== Design ==
Following their worst season in their thirty-year history—in which they finished ninth in the World Constructors' Championship with just five points—the team underwent a technical review, employing former McLaren designer Mike Coughlan (having served his suspension for his role in the 2007 Formula One espionage controversy) as Chief Designer, and promoting Jason Somerville to Head of Aerodynamics.

The FW34 used the Renault RS27-2012 engine; the team had previously used Renault engines between 1989 and 1997. The car, which was launched on the 7 February 2012, was driven by Pastor Maldonado and Bruno Senna.

== Racing history ==
The car proved to be far more competitive than its predecessor from the British team so much so that it allowed Maldonado to contend for the top positions as early as the Australian Grand Prix, where the Venezuelan driver retired on the final lap while running in sixth place. At the Spanish Grand Prix, Maldonado drove the FW34 to pole position and converted it to victory the next day. It was Maldonado's first and only Formula One race win, Williams' first race win since Juan Pablo Montoya won the 2004 Brazilian Grand Prix driving an FW26, and Williams' most recent race win as of October 2026.

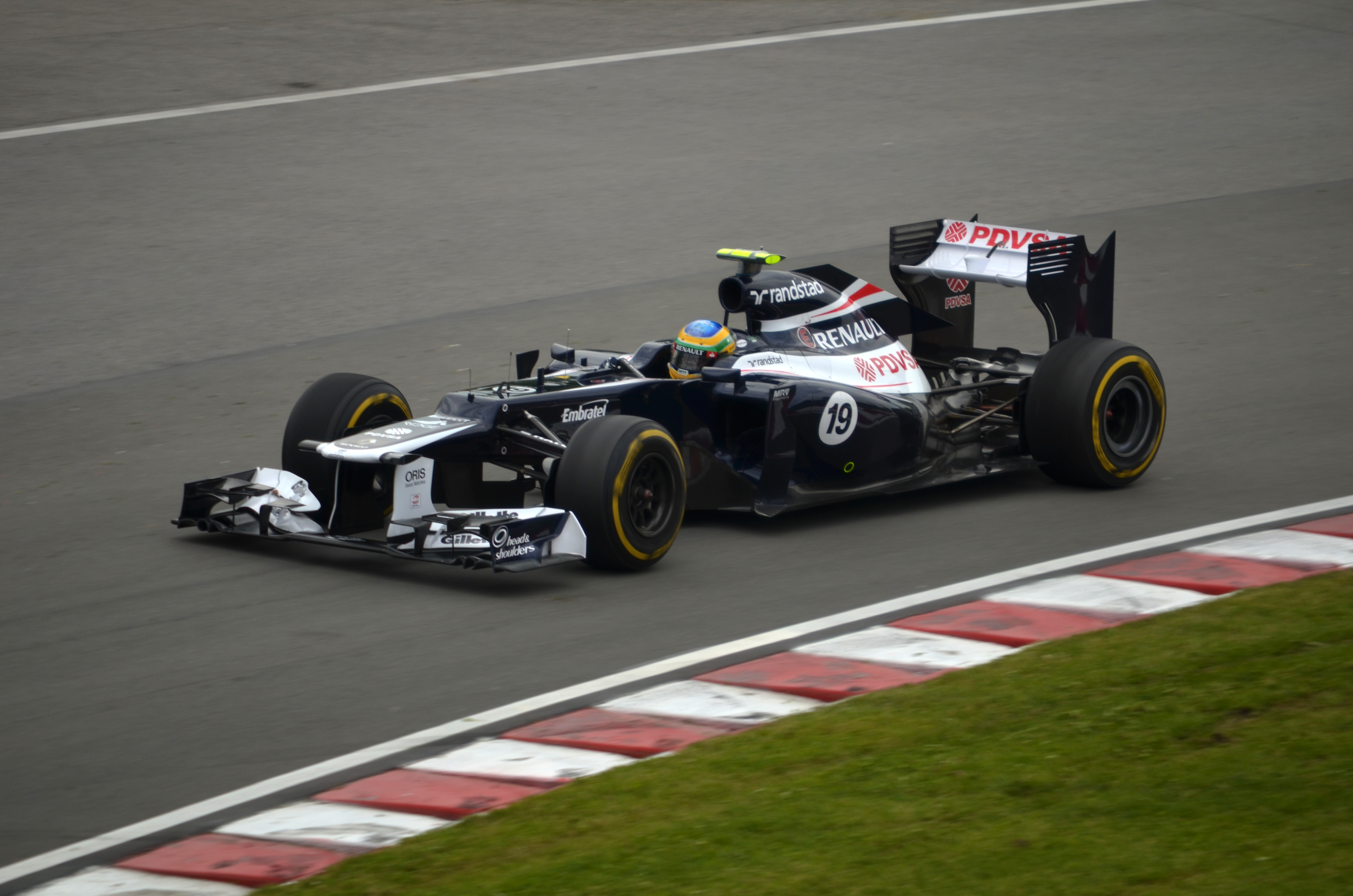
Senna during the Canadian Grand Prix

Despite several strong qualifying performances from Maldonado, his best result for the remainder of the season was just a fifth-place finish at the Abu Dhabi Grand Prix. Otherwise, Maldonado’s season was hampered by a long series of penalties and accidents, while Senna more consistent than his teammate managed a few further points finishes, albeit at the lower end of the points scoring positions, with a sixth place finish at Malaysia, as his best result.

== Sponsorship and livery ==
Drawing the inspiration from the Rothmans-sponsored FW19 of 1997, the blue colour on the engine cover was flipped along with other minor changes. PDVSA was retained for the second year with new sponsorships from Procter & Gamble products (Gillette and Head & Shoulders).

== Complete Formula One results ==
(key) (results in bold indicate pole position; results in italics indicate fastest lap)

Year	Entrant	Engine	Tyres	Drivers	1	2	3	4	5	6	7	8	9	10	11	12	13	14	15	16	17	18	19	20	Points	WCC
2012	Williams F1	Renault RS27-2012	**P**		AUS	MAL	CHN	BHR	ESP	MON	CAN	EUR	GBR	GER	HUN	BEL	ITA	SIN	JPN	KOR	IND	ABU	USA	BRA	76	8th
2012	Williams F1	Renault RS27-2012	**P**	Pastor Maldonado	13^{†}	19^{†}	8	Ret	**1**	Ret	13	12	16	15	13	Ret	11	Ret	8	14	16	5	9	Ret	76	8th
2012	Williams F1	Renault RS27-2012	**P**	Bruno Senna	16^{†}	6	7	22^{†}	Ret	10	17	10	9	17	7	12	10	18^{†}	14	15	10	8	10	Ret	76	8th

^{†} Driver failed to finish the race, but was classified as they had completed greater than 90% of the race distance.
