= 2014 British Grand Prix =

Race 9 of 19 in the 2014 Formula One World Championship
← Previous race	Next race →
- Layout of the Silverstone Circuit

Race details
- Date: 6 July 2014
- Official name: 2014 Formula 1 Santander British Grand Prix
- Location: Silverstone Circuit; Silverstone, United Kingdom
- Course: Permanent racing facility
- Course length: 5.891 km (3.661 miles)
- Distance: 52 laps, 306.198 km (190.263 (Note: There is a 0.134 km (0.083 mi) offset between the start and finish lines.) miles)
- Weather: Mostly cloudy with maximum temperatures reaching 21 degrees during the day.
- Attendance: 122,000

Pole position
Driver	(Germany) Nico Rosberg	Mercedes
- Time: 1:35.766

Fastest lap
Driver	(United Kingdom) Lewis Hamilton	Mercedes
- Time: 1:37.176 on lap 26

Podium
First	(United Kingdom) Lewis Hamilton	Mercedes
Second	(Finland) Valtteri Bottas	Williams-Mercedes
Third	(Australia) Daniel Ricciardo	Red Bull Racing-Renault

The 2014 British Grand Prix (formally the 2014 Formula 1 Santander British Grand Prix) was a Formula One motor race held on 6 July 2014 at the Silverstone Circuit in Silverstone, United Kingdom before a crowd of 122,000 people. It was the ninth round of the 2014 Formula One World Championship, and the 65th British Grand Prix to be held as part of the series. Lewis Hamilton of the Mercedes team won the 52-lap race, from a sixth position start. Williams driver Valtteri Bottas finished second, with Daniel Ricciardo third for the Red Bull squad. It was Hamilton's fifth victory of 2014 and the 27th of his career.

Heading into the event, Hamilton's teammate Nico Rosberg led the World Drivers' Championship and his team Mercedes led the World Constructors' Championship. Hamilton's teammate Nico Rosberg recorded the fastest lap in qualifying to start from pole position. The race was suspended for one hour, five minutes after a first-lap accident involving Kimi Räikkönen left a section of guardrail barrier needing repair. Rosberg led for 18 laps after the restart as Hamilton moved to second, then made a pit stop for tyres, giving the lead to Hamilton for six laps. Hamilton took the lead for good when Rosberg retired from a gearbox fault on the 29th lap; he won by more than 30 seconds over Bottas. Ricciardo held off McLaren's Jenson Button in the final laps to take third.

Rosberg's non-finish left him with a reduced lead of four championship points over Hamilton in the World Drivers' Championship. Ricciardo and Fernando Alonso of Ferrari maintained third and fourth respectively, and Bottas passed Red Bull driver Sebastian Vettel for fifth. In the World Constructors' Championship, Mercedes held a 158-point lead over Red Bull and Ferrari was third. Williams overtook Force India for fourth with ten races left in the season.

== Background ==
The 2014 British Grand Prix was the 9th of the 19 races in the 2014 Formula One World Championship and the 65th edition of the event as a round of the World Championship. It was held at the 18-turn 5.891 km (3.660 mi) Silverstone Circuit in Silverstone, Northamptonshire, England on 6 July. Tyre supplier Pirelli brought a white-banded Medium and orange-banded Hard dry-compounds to the race as well as two wet-weather compounds, the intermediate and full wet tyres. The drag reduction system (DRS), an adjustable flap at the back of each car that helps with overtaking when activated, had two activation zones for the race: one on the Wellington Straight linking the Arena and Brooklands turns, and one on the Hangar Straight between Chapel and Stowe corners. After the 2013 race, artificial grass was removed at the exits at three corner, the inside side barrier at the entrance to Brooklands corner was enlarged, and circuit drainage was improved.

After the Austrian Grand Prix two weeks earlier, Mercedes driver Nico Rosberg led the World Drivers' Championship with 165 championship points, ahead of his second-placed teammate Lewis Hamilton with 136 championship points. Daniel Ricciardo of the Red Bull team was third with 83 championship points, and Ferrari's Fernando Alonso followed close behind in fourth with 79 championship points. Sebastian Vettel, in the second Red Bull car, was fifth with 60 championship points. Mercedes led the World Constructors' Championship with 301 championship points with Red Bull second with 143 championship points, Ferrari with 98 championship points, and Force India with 87 championship points battling Williams with 85 championship points for fourth position.

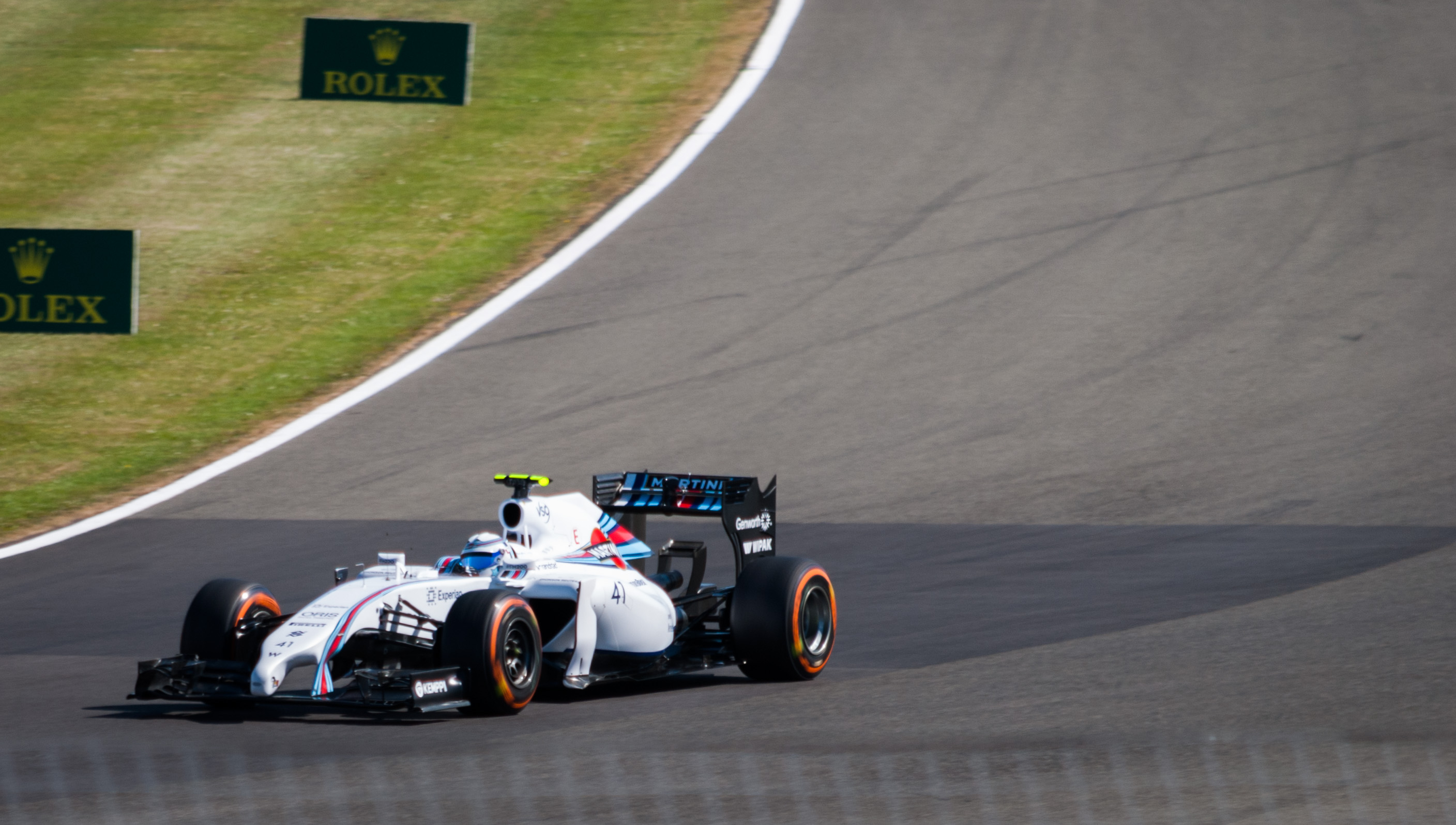
Susie Wolff was the first woman to drive in a Formula One race weekend since Giovanna Amati in 1992.

After a series of errors in the previous four rounds left Hamilton 29 points behind Rosberg, the Mercedes non-executive chairman Niki Lauda suggested this would motivate Hamilton to perform better at the British Grand Prix and saw no reason to guide him in his driving, "Lewis will fight back, there is no worry on my case about this at all. He is not in any way disturbed. He will keep fighting. Don't worry." Valtteri Bottas said Williams intended to run well at Silverstone and sought to build on the momentum from Austria, "I am really looking forward to Silverstone. It's always a great event and means a lot to us as it's the team's home Grand Prix, so hopefully some of the guys from the factory can come up and support us as well." Ricciardo said he was looking forward to the race as he liked the Silverstone track.

There were a total of 11 teams (each representing a different constructor) each fielded two race drivers for the Grand Prix with four driver changes for the first practice session. Williams development driver Susie Wolff drove for the team in lieu of Bottas, becoming the first woman to take part in a Formula One Grand Prix weekend since Giovanna Amati's attempted to qualify for the 1992 Brazilian Grand Prix. Force India gave Daniel Juncadella, the team's reserve and simulator driver and Mercedes-Benz Deutsche Tourenwagen Masters racer, his first Formula One race appearance in Nico Hülkenberg's car at Silverstone. Former GP2 Series competitor Robin Frijns drove Kamui Kobayashi's Caterham for the second time in the 2014 season; the Bahrain Grand Prix in April was the first. Finally, and for the fourth time in 2014, Giedo van der Garde took Adrian Sutil's Sauber seat.

== Practice ==
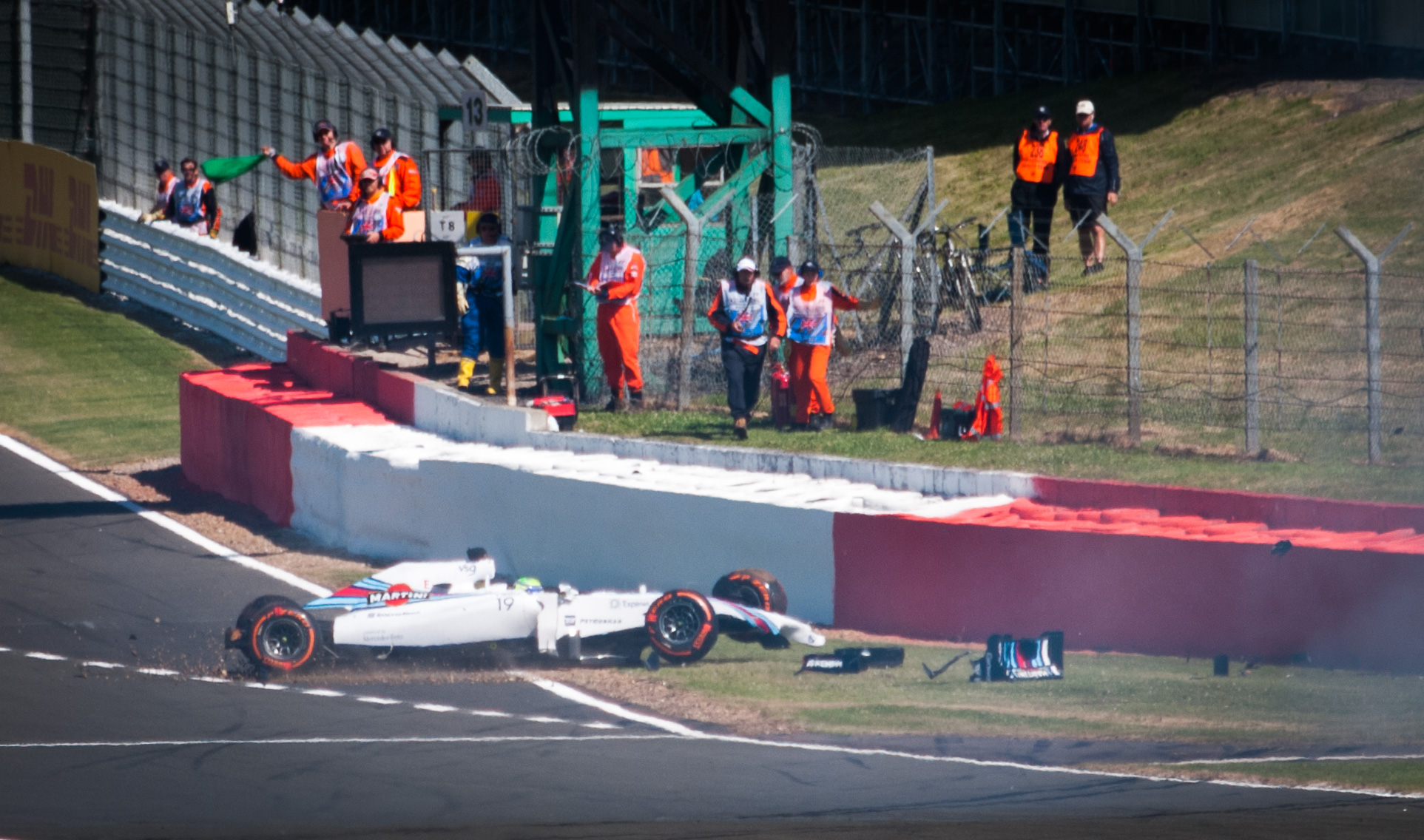
Felipe Massa crashed at the exit of Stowe corner in the first practice session.

Per the regulations for the 2014 season, three practice sessions were held: two 90-minute sessions on Friday and another 60-minute session on Saturday. In the first session, Rosberg set the fastest lap at 1:35.424. Hamilton, Alonso, Ricciardo, Kimi Räikkönen, Vettel, Jenson Button, Daniil Kvyat, Jean-Éric Vergne and Kevin Magnussen were in positions two to ten. Four minutes in, Felipe Massa ran onto artificial grass at the exit of Stowe corner and was sent backwards into a sideways spin, hitting the outside tyre barrier at 130 mph (210 km/h). His damaged Williams FW36 car stopped near the entry to the pit lane and the session was halted for 17 minutes as track marshals removed it. Later, an oil pressure problem caused Wolff's engine to shut down after four laps, and Marcus Ericsson spun at Becketts turn. After the session, Ricciardo and Rosberg were summoned to the stewards for overtaking Alonso and Kvyat under red flag conditions. Both drivers were deemed to have driven safely under series regulations after data examination and their explanations convinced the stewards not to penalise them.

Hamilton used soft compound tyres to record the fastest lap of the second session with a 1:35.508 lap set early in the session; his running was curtailed because his engine cut out with 30 minutes to go. Rosberg, Alonso, the Red Bull pair of Ricciardo and Vettel, Bottas, Button, Magunssen, Räikkönen and Vergne rounded out the top ten. A localised explosion tore through the left-hand side of Bottas' engine cover and loosened it with five minutes to go. Vergne's left-front wheel detached at Abbey corner and he had to stop at the side of the track. On Saturday morning, FIA race director Charlie Whiting adopted a "zero tolerance policy" and cautioned drivers not to run wide leaving Copse and Club without being forced or their lap times would be deleted in a bid to enforce stricter regulations on driving off the track. Overnight rain made the track wet and a north-westerly wind was a factor in the final session; four drivers chose not to set a timed lap and some went off the slippery track. Vettel set the fastest lap of 1:52.522, with his teammate Ricciardo second. Pastor Maldonado, Romain Grosjean, Sutil, Kvyat, Magnussen, Button, Bottas and Räikkönen completed the top ten. Jules Bianchi broke his front wing in an impact with the barrier at Stowe corner. Sutil also avoided hitting the wall at Stowe turn and exited the corner's gravel trap.

== Qualifying ==
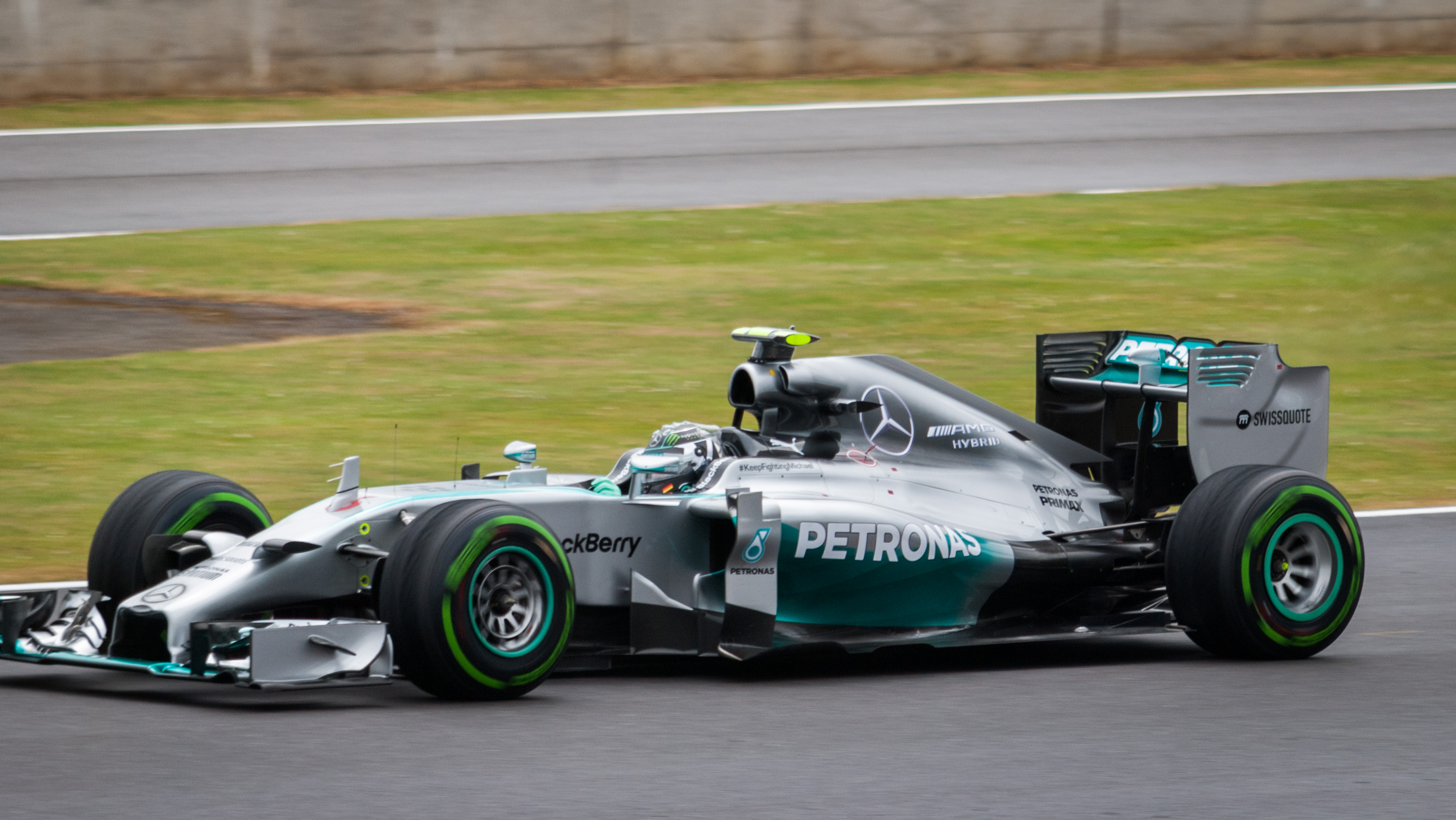
Nico Rosberg had the fourth pole position of his season and the eighth of his career.

Saturday afternoon's qualifying session was divided into three parts. The first part ran for 18 minutes, eliminating cars that finished qualifying 17th or below. The 107% rule was in effect, requiring drivers to reach a time within 107 per cent of the fastest lap to qualify. The second part lasted 15 minutes, eliminating cars that finished 11th to 16th. The final session lasted 12 minutes and determined pole position to tenth. Cars who progressed to the final session were not allowed to change tyres for the race's start, using the tyres with which they set their best lap times in the second session. A damp track worsened as rain began to fall with increasing, if intermittent, severity; all drivers used intermediate compound tyres for the first two sessions. The rain stopped at the start of the third session and drivers used dry tyres in its first minutes. Rain soon returned and they drove to the pit lane. Several drivers returned to the circuit with three minutes left for one last try at improving their laps. Rosberg took his fourth pole position of the season and the eighth of his career with a 1:35.766 lap. He was joined on the grid's front row by Vettel who bowed out of his first try due to the rain. Third-place Button went wide at Aintree corner and oversteered on the run to the Hangar Straight and began from the top three at Silverstone for the first time since the 2005 British Grand Prix. Hülkenberg in fourth briefly held pole position as he was the first driver to improve his lap on the drying track. Magnussen was fifth. Hamilton provisionally held the pole position after all first timed laps; he fell to sixth after he abandoned his final attempt because it was slower and he felt the track was not dry enough to improve his lap times.

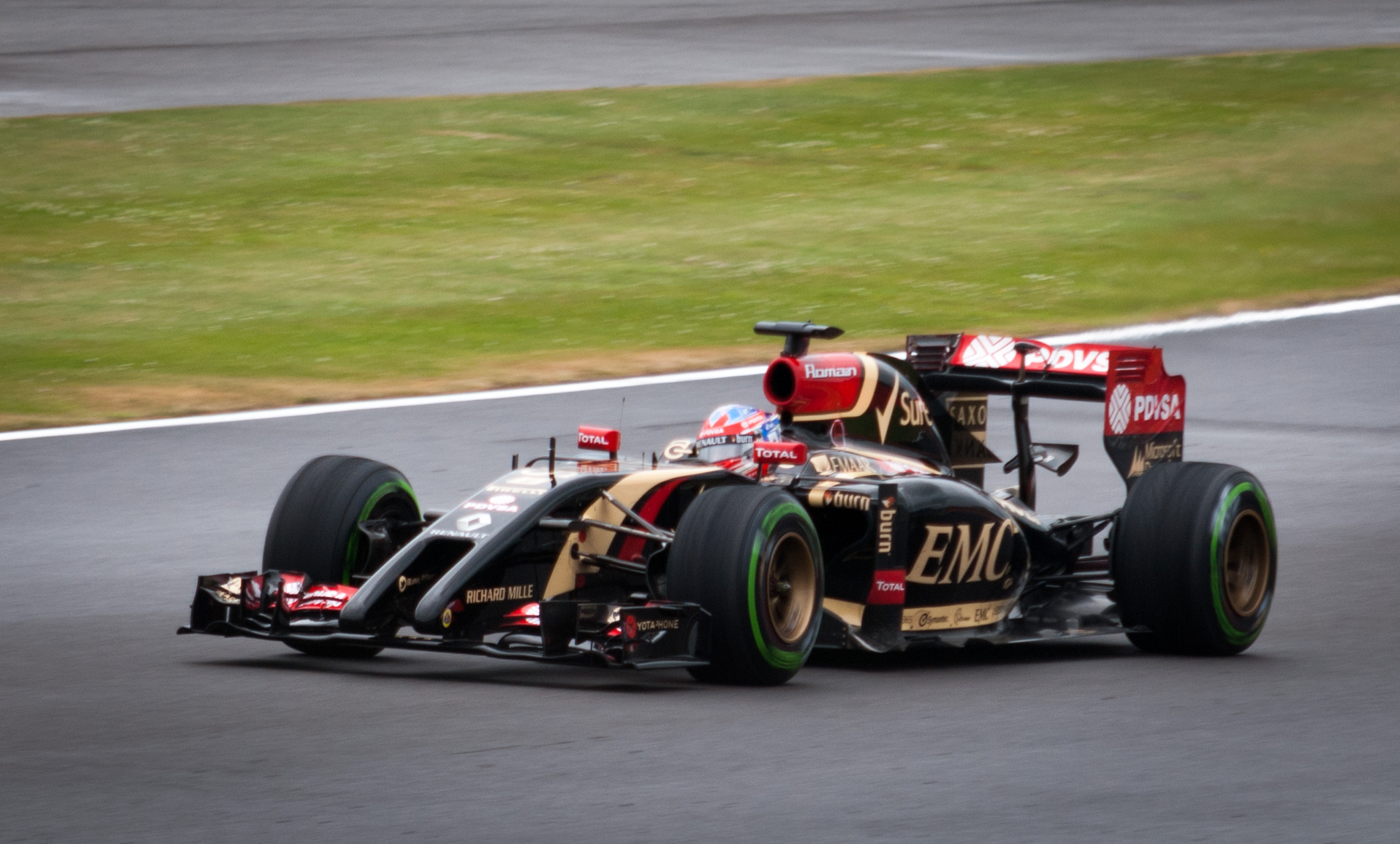
Romain Grosjean was the first of the 22 drivers not to qualify within the top ten positions.

Sergio Pérez in seventh ran wide at Chapel turn and lost heat in his tyres. Eighth-placed Ricciardo did not anticipate the improvement in track conditions and he remained in the pit lane. The Toro Rosso duo of Kvyat and Vergne were ninth and tenth. Grosjean was the fastest driver not to advance to the final session, because a yellow flag at Brooklands corner required him to slow. Marussia fuelled their cars for the second session and its reaction to the changing weather saw Bianchi qualify 12th and Max Chilton 13th. However, Chilton incurred a five-place grid penalty for changing his gearbox after the third practice session. Esteban Gutiérrez lost traction in his vehicle on a kerb leaving Brooklands corner and was sent backwards into a guardrail barrier at Luffield turn. He was 14th and also incurred a ten-place grid penalty for an unsafe release at the preceding round in Austria. Maldonado in 15th had a fuel pressure problem in the second session requiring him to stop his car. He was demoted five places for not providing the FIA with at least 1 L (0.22 imp gal; 0.26 US gal) of fuel for analysis. Hence, Sutil started 13th after he lost control of his car's rear and got beached in a gravel trap. A strategy error left the Williams pair of Bottas and Massa to drive on a wet track on dry compound tyres and took 14th and 15th. Alonso in 16th (who spun at Brooklands turn) and his teammate Räikkönen in 17th were also caught out by the weather and used the incorrect tyre compound, after Ferrari spent longer than most teams deciding their strategy. The Caterham cars of Ericsson and Kamui Kobayashi were slow enough to transgress the 107 per cent rule. The stewards granted them dispensation to start the race.

=== Qualifying classification ===
The fastest lap in each of the three sessions is denoted in bold.

Pos.	No.	Driver	Constructor	Q1	Q2	Q3	Grid
1	6	(Germany) Nico Rosberg	Mercedes	**1:40.380**	1:35.179	**1:35.766**	1
2	1	(Germany) Sebastian Vettel	Red Bull Racing-Renault	1:45.086	1:36.410	1:37.386	2
3	22	(United Kingdom) Jenson Button	McLaren-Mercedes	1:44.425	1:36.579	1:38.200	3
4	27	(Germany) Nico Hülkenberg	Force India-Mercedes	1:41.271	1:37.112	1:38.329	4
5	20	(Denmark) Kevin Magnussen	McLaren-Mercedes	1:42.507	1:37.370	1:38.417	5
6	44	(United Kingdom) Lewis Hamilton	Mercedes	1:41.058	**1:34.870**	1:39.232	6
7	11	(Mexico) Sergio Pérez	Force India-Mercedes	1:42.146	1:37.350	1:40.457	7
8	3	(Australia) Daniel Ricciardo	Red Bull Racing-Renault	1:44.710	1:38.166	1:40.606	8
9	26	(Russia) Daniil Kvyat	Toro Rosso-Renault	1:41.032	1:36.813	1:40.707	9
10	25	(France) Jean-Éric Vergne	Toro Rosso-Renault	1:43.040	1:37.800	1:40.855	10
11	8	(France) Romain Grosjean	Lotus-Renault	1:43.121	1:38.496	N/A	11
12	17	(France) Jules Bianchi	Marussia-Ferrari	1:41.169	1:38.709	N/A	12
13	4	(United Kingdom) Max Chilton	Marussia-Ferrari	1:42.082	1:39.800	N/A	17^{1}
14	21	(Mexico) Esteban Gutiérrez	Sauber-Ferrari	1:43.285	1:40.912	N/A	19^{2}
EX^{3}	13	(Venezuela) Pastor Maldonado	Lotus-Renault	1:43.892	1:44.018	N/A	20^{3}
16	99	(Germany) Adrian Sutil	Sauber-Ferrari	1:42.603	No time	N/A	13
17	77	(Finland) Valtteri Bottas	Williams-Mercedes	1:45.318	N/A	N/A	14
18	19	(Brazil) Felipe Massa	Williams-Mercedes	1:45.695	N/A	N/A	15
19	14	(Spain) Fernando Alonso	Ferrari	1:45.935	N/A	N/A	16
20	7	(Finland) Kimi Räikkönen	Ferrari	1:46.684	N/A	N/A	18
107% time: 1:47.406
21	9	(Sweden) Marcus Ericsson	Caterham-Renault	1:49.421	N/A	N/A	21^{4}
22	10	(Japan) Kamui Kobayashi	Caterham-Renault	1:49.625	N/A	N/A	22^{4}

Notes:

- **^1** – Max Chilton was given a five-place grid penalty for unscheduled gearbox change.
- **^2** – Esteban Gutiérrez was given a ten-place grid penalty for an unsafe release at the previous round in Austria.
- **^3** – Pastor Maldonado was excluded from the results for violating the rules by not having enough fuel, and he was moved to the back of the grid.
- **^4** – Marcus Ericsson and Kamui Kobayashi failed to set a lap time within 107% of the fastest lap time set by Nico Rosberg in the first session. The stewards gave them permission to start the race.

== Race ==
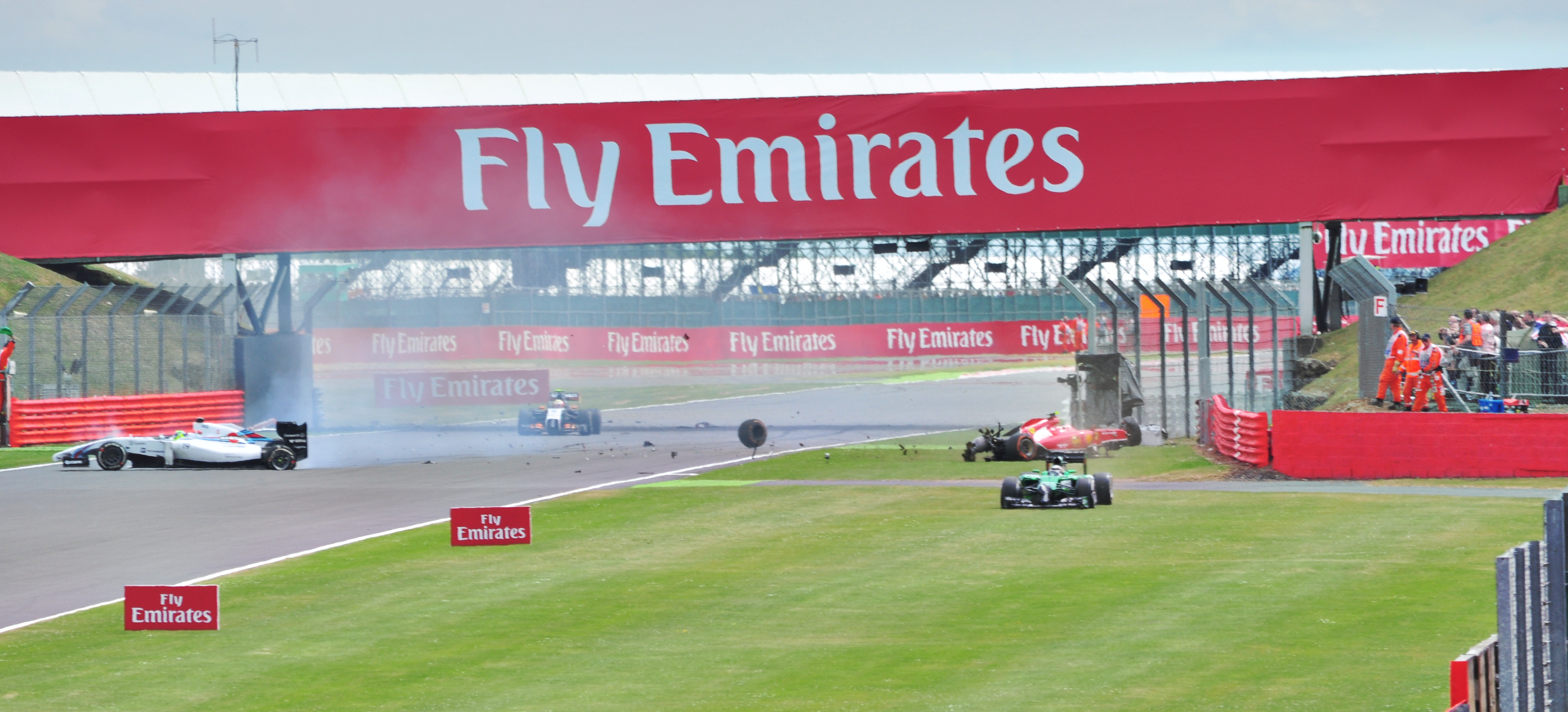
Kimi Räikkönen crashed on the opening lap of the race. Crash barrier damage forced its suspension for an hour.

The weather at the start was dry and sunny with the air temperature between 17 and 19 °C (63 and 66 °F) and the track temperature from 33 to 39 °C (91 to 102 °F); no rain was forecast. The 52-lap race began before 120,000 people at 13:00 local time, with Rosberg making a brisk start to hold the lead into Abbey corner. Vettel in second had a slow start and Button and Magnussen passed him. Hamilton moved from sixth to fourth as Massa stalled from 15th. On the Wellington Straight, the rear of Räikkönen's Ferrari F14 T car got loose and he drove onto the run-off area. He identified a run-off area without grass to reemerge on the track, rejoining at an angle at 150 mph (240 km/h), causing him to hit a bump on a grass verge and unsettling his car. He was vaulted right at an angle and into the guardrail barrier close to the pillar of an overhead bridge in a 47 g_{0} (460 m/s^{2}) impact. The Ferrari's right-front tyre flew by Chilton, who had to duck his head to avoid being struck; his front wing and front-left brake duct were damaged.

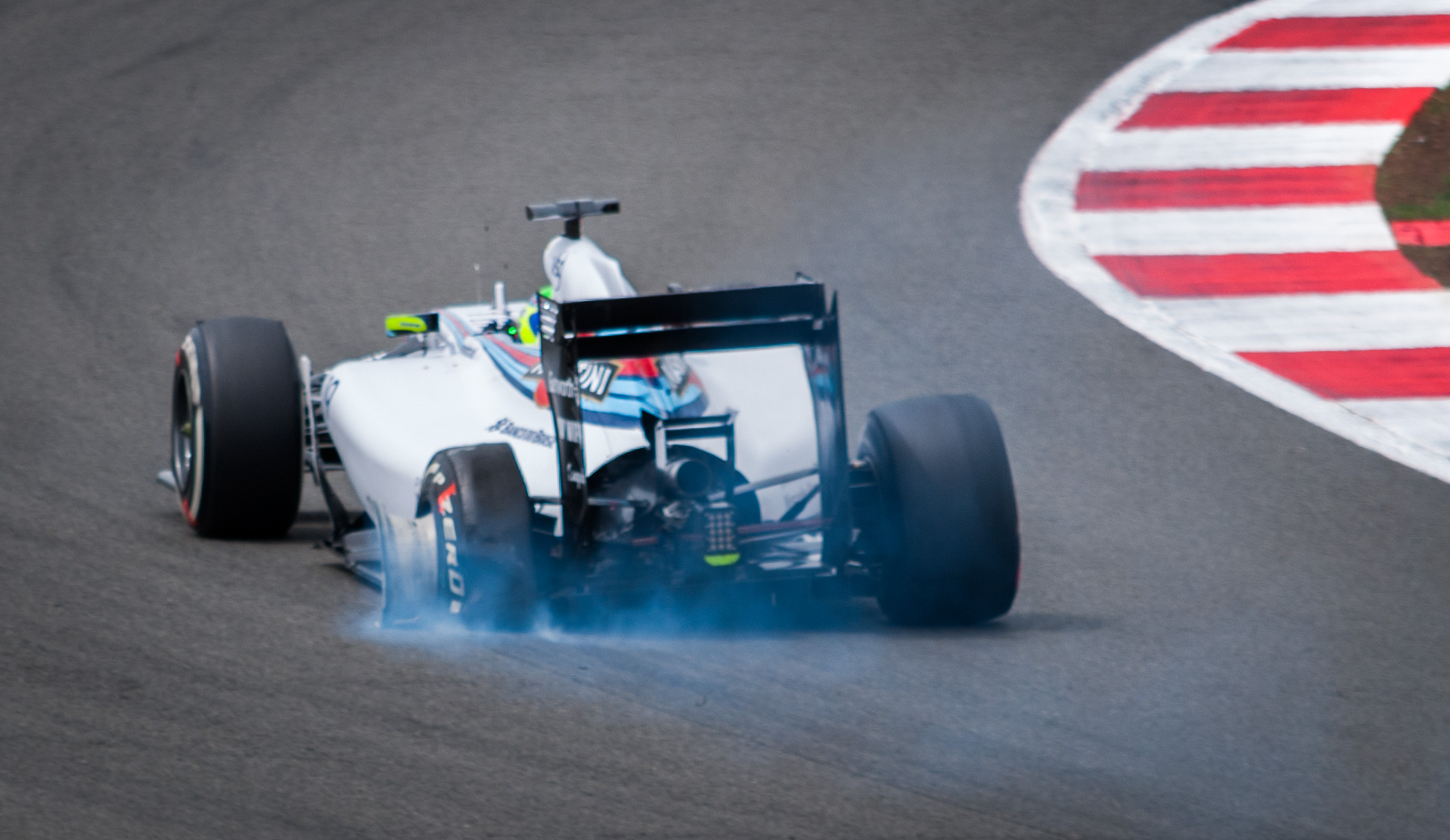
Massa went back to the starting grid but had to retire because of damage to his car.

Räikkönen ricocheted across the track and into the path of Kobayashi and Massa. Kobayashi grazed the front of the Ferrari and veered onto the grass; Massa applied the brakes upon seeing the impact, trying to spin to the right to avoid a T-bone collision. The rear of Massa's car made contact with the front of Räikkönen's. A track marshal assisted Räikkönen, who had hip and heel injuries, out of his car and into an ambulance for transport to the circuit's medical centre. The safety car was deployed for a lap until Whiting discovered the barriers were dented and needed repair, and stopped the race. Every driver was directed to stop on the grid. Damage to Massa's rear suspension necessitated his retirement. In the meantime, Chilton incurred a drive-through penalty for entering the pit lane under red flag conditions. Repairs to the barrier prevented the resumption of the race for an hour, five minutes until course workers were finished at 14:05 local time. The race was restarted behind the safety car with the drivers in the positions held before the suspension.

Both Red Bulls switched to the hard-compound tyres on the grid during the stoppage and Alonso used the softer compounds to improve the possibility of making a solitary pit stop by driving on the more durable harder tyres later on. Rosberg was first, followed by the McLarens of Button and Magnussen. Bottas overtook Kvyat at Brooklands corner to move into ninth and Hamilton began to challenge Magnussen for third. On lap three, Hamilton drew alongside Magnussen through Woodcote turn and passed him for third entering Copse corner as Magnussen ran off the track. That same lap, Bottas overtook Ricciardo on the Hangar Straight for seventh as Alonso passed Gutiérrez for 12th. During the next lap, Hamilton drew alongside Button and overtook him on the outside at Brooklands turn for second. Alonso passed Sutil for 11nth before Brooklands corner and then Bianchi for tenth as Hülkenberg lost sixth to Bottas in Stowe turn on the fifth lap. DRS was enabled on lap six. That lap, Alonso used DRS to pass Kvyat on the outside leaving Woodcote corner and into Luffield turn for ninth. Ricciardo overtook Hülkenberg at Stowe corner and the subsequent loss of momentum allowed Alonso to get by him around the outside at Vale corner for eighth on lap seven.

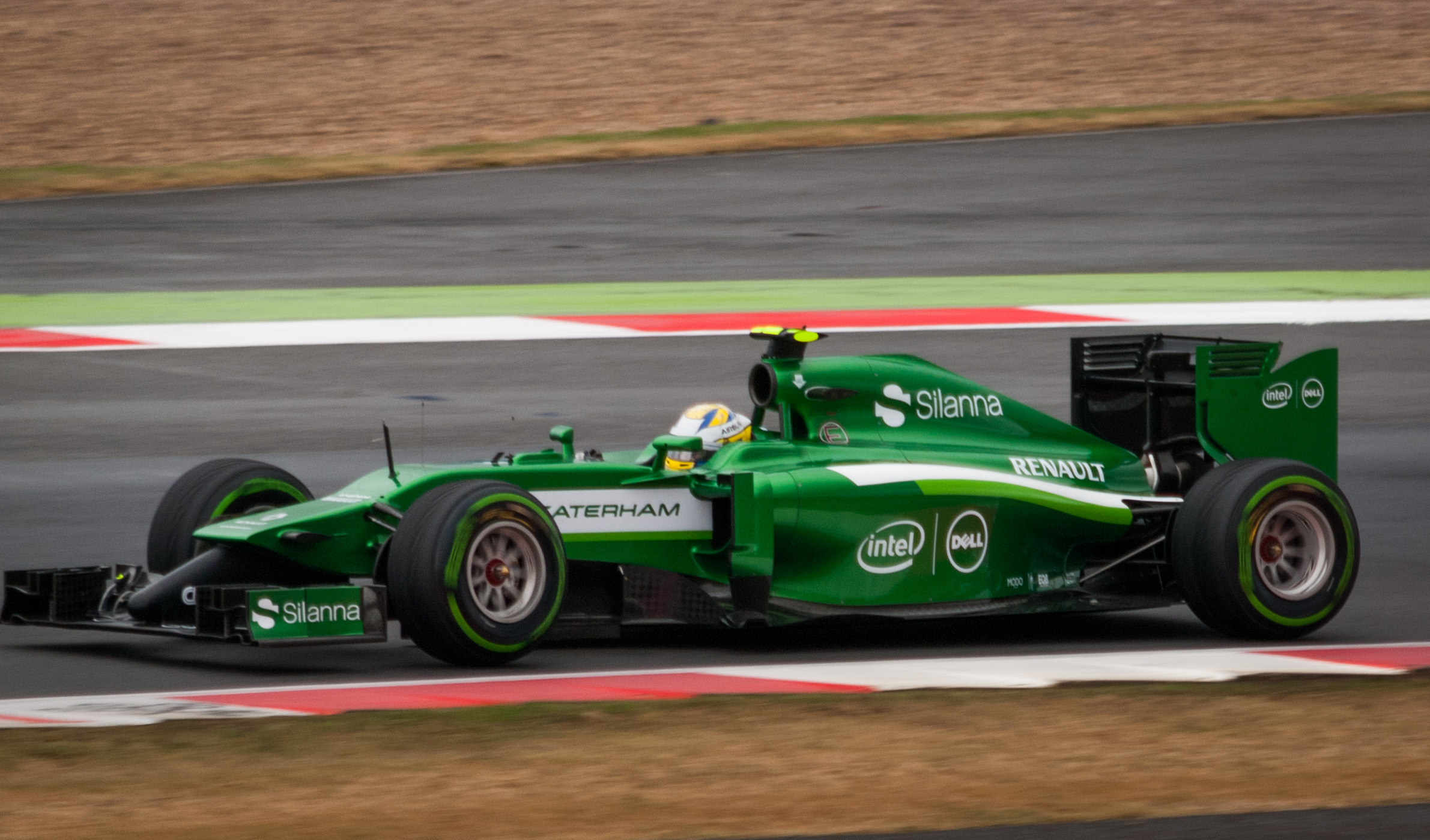
Marcus Ericsson retired on the 12th lap with a suspension failure on his Caterham.

On lap eight, Alonso used DRS to pass Hülkenberg on the outside at Brooklands turn after a short battle. Further back Sutil passed Bianchi for 11th as Ricciardo battled Hülkenberg for eighth at Luffield turn on lap ten but could not pass due to the latter's higher straight-line speed. Ricciardo tried again into Stowe corner and succeeded. On the inside at Club turn on the same lap, Gutiérrez attempted to pass Maldonado, who sought to overtake Bianchi. Gutiérrez hit Maldonado's left-hand side; contact continued through the corner and Maldonado was launched airborne off Gutiérrez's right-front tyre. Gutiérrez got beached in a gravel trap and retired with rear car damage. The first pit stops for tyres occurred on lap 11 as Vettel entered the pit lane to try and pass the McLarens; the faster Bottas, behind him, was thus freed to try to catch Magnussen. On the next lap, Ericsson's suspension failed on the Brooklands corner kerb and he drove to the pit lane to retire. Alonso incurred a five-second stop-and-go penalty on the 13th lap because he was deemed to have been out of position on his grid slot for the restart.

By the 14th lap Bottas had caught Magnussen, and entering Stowe corner used his DRS and better speed to pass him on the outside for fourth. Alonso overtook Magnussen around the outside of Stowe corner for fifth as Ricciardo made a pit stop for the soft compound tyres on lap 15. Two laps later, Bottas passed Button at Stowe turn for third. On that lap, Ricciardo passed Sutil on the approach to Stowe corner for ninth. Rosberg made his first pit stop from the lead on the 18th lap. Hamilton led for six laps; the plan was for him to run the middle stint on the hard-compound tyres before his own stop at the conclusion of lap 24. In the meantime, Rosberg began developing gearbox problems on lap 20. As Alonso battled with Button, a stone lodged in his rear wing slot gap that remained there for the rest of the Grand Prix. He twice oversteered coming through Becketts corner as Ricciardo passed Hülkenberg for eighth. Rosberg had increased his advantage over Hamilton, whose pit stop lasted 1.7 seconds than expected as his hard-compound left-rear wheel was slow to install at his pit box, to six seconds.

On the 25th lap, Vettel passed Magnussen for sixth at the exit of Luffield turn. Three laps later, Alonso overtook Hülkenberg through Copse corner for eighth after the former took his five-second stop-and-go penalty. As Hamilton reduced Rosberg's lead from six to four seconds within three laps on his newer tyres, the latter had gear-selection problems. Rosberg attempted to change his gearbox's settings; this did not work as he slowed at Village corner and Hamilton took the lead on the Wellington Straight on lap 29. Rosberg steered onto the grass down the approach to Becketts corner, and retired due to his gearbox. Attention then focused on the battle for third. Ricciardo's pit stop allowed him to change his strategy into a one-stopper, as tyre degradation rates were less than during the two Friday practice sessions. Bottas made his second pit stop on lap 32 and emerged in third behind Vettel. Two laps later, Bottas glimpsed space and passed Vettel for second on the Hangar Straight.

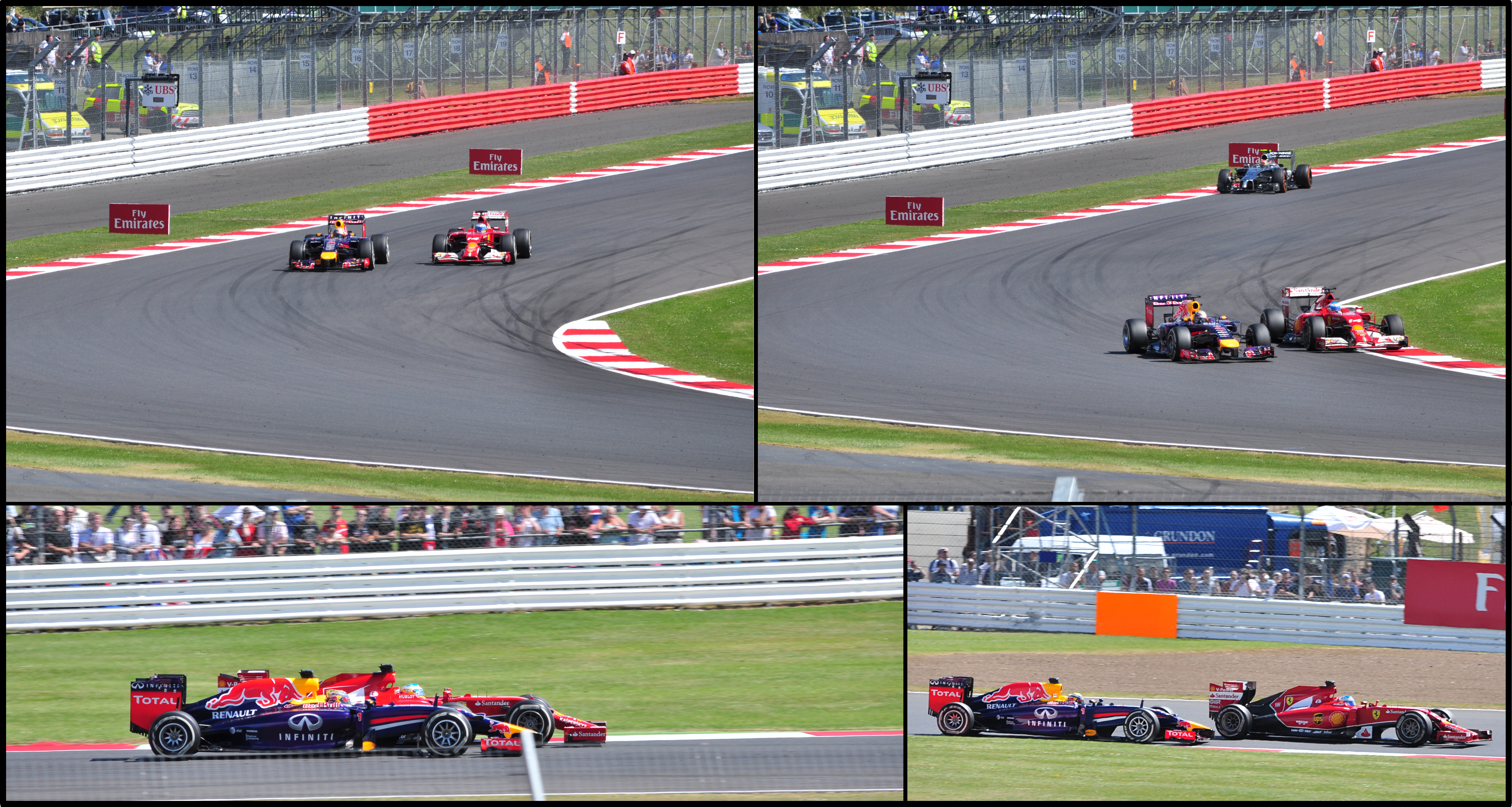
The battle between Sebastian Vettel and Fernando Alonso for fifth in the final laps of the race.

Vettel immediately made a second pit stop at the end of the lap. He rejoined ahead of Alonso in fifth place. Alonso twice passed Vettel around the outside at Copse corner during a duel for fifth between laps 35 and 36. On lap 37, Vettel had optimum tyre temperature, and used DRS on the Wellington Straight to pass Alonso on the outside under braking. Alonso then went across the front of Vettel leaving Brooklands corner to retain fifth. Vettel saw space to pass Alonso at Brooklands corner on lap 42, but the latter blocked his pass on the racing line. Three laps later, Vettel turned to the outside of Luffield corner. Although he did not pass Alonso, Vettel entered the straight faster than the former who reacted by turning to the inside past the former Grand Prix pit lane to block him. On the 47th lap, Vettel turned to the outside at Brooklands corner to draw alongside Alonso through Woodcote turn but Alonso kept fifth by braking later than him.

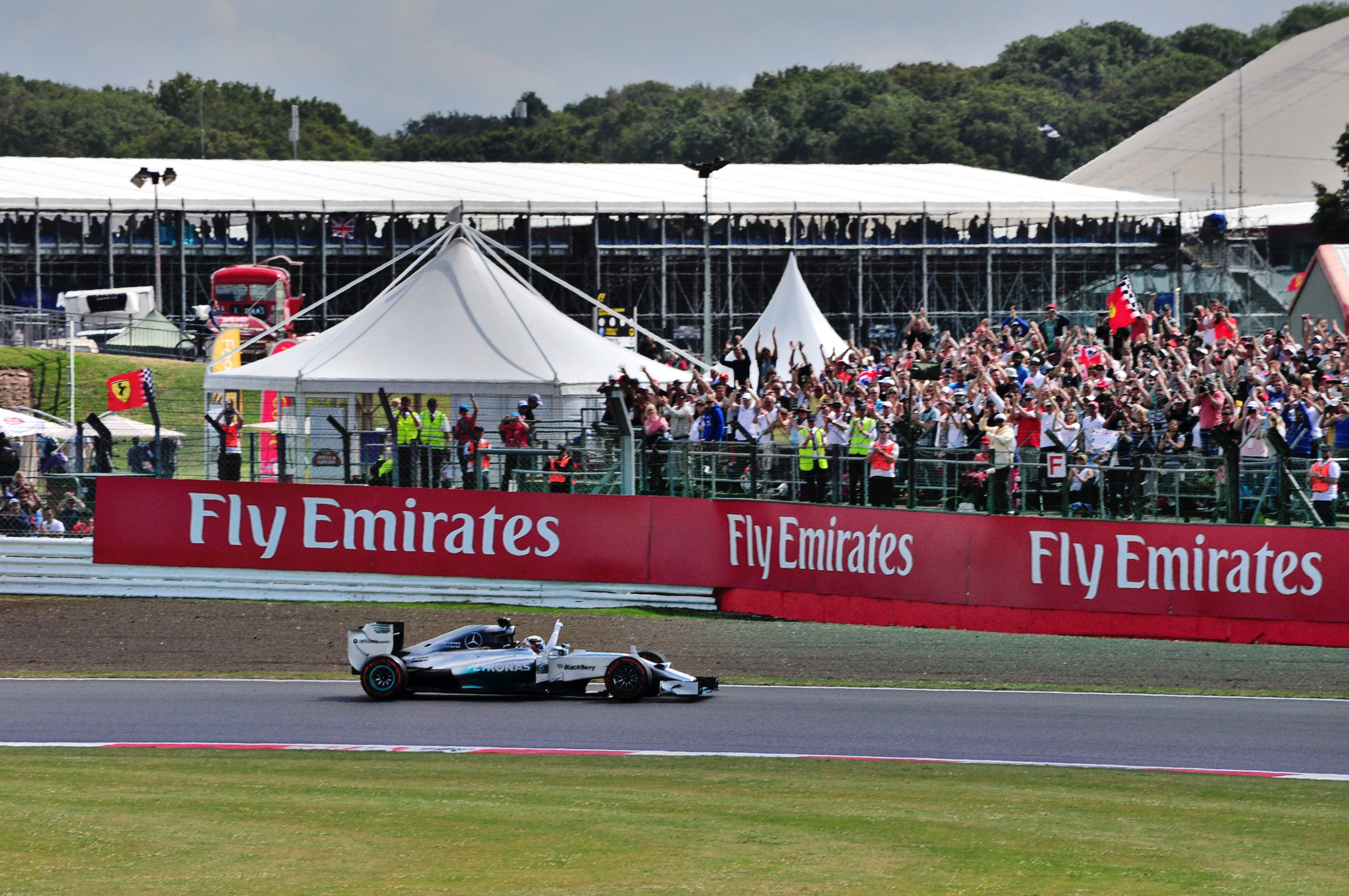
Lewis Hamilton celebrating his 27th career victory in front of the crowd.

Vettel was aided by the rear of Alonso's car stepping out into Copse corner and overtook him on the outside for fifth. Once past, Vettel pulled away from Alonso. In the meantime, Button drew closer to Ricciardo; he had made a pit stop earlier than the latter, and his two-stop strategy left him the faster of the two. Maldonado's exhaust failed on the 51st lap, and he retired at the side of the track at Abbey turn with smoke billowing from the rear of his car. Unchallenged in the final 23 laps, Hamilton achieved his fifth victory of the season, and the 27th of his career to equal three-time World Champion Jackie Stewart's race wins total. Bottas followed 30.135 seconds later in second and Ricciardo was another 16 seconds behind in third. Button could not get close enough to pass Ricciardo and finished fourth. Vettel, Alonso and Magnussen were in positions five to seven. Hülkenberg held off Kvyat in ninth to take eighth and Vergne was tenth. The final finishers were Pérez, Grosjean, Sutil, Bianchi, Kobayashi, Chilton and Maldonado.

=== Post-race ===
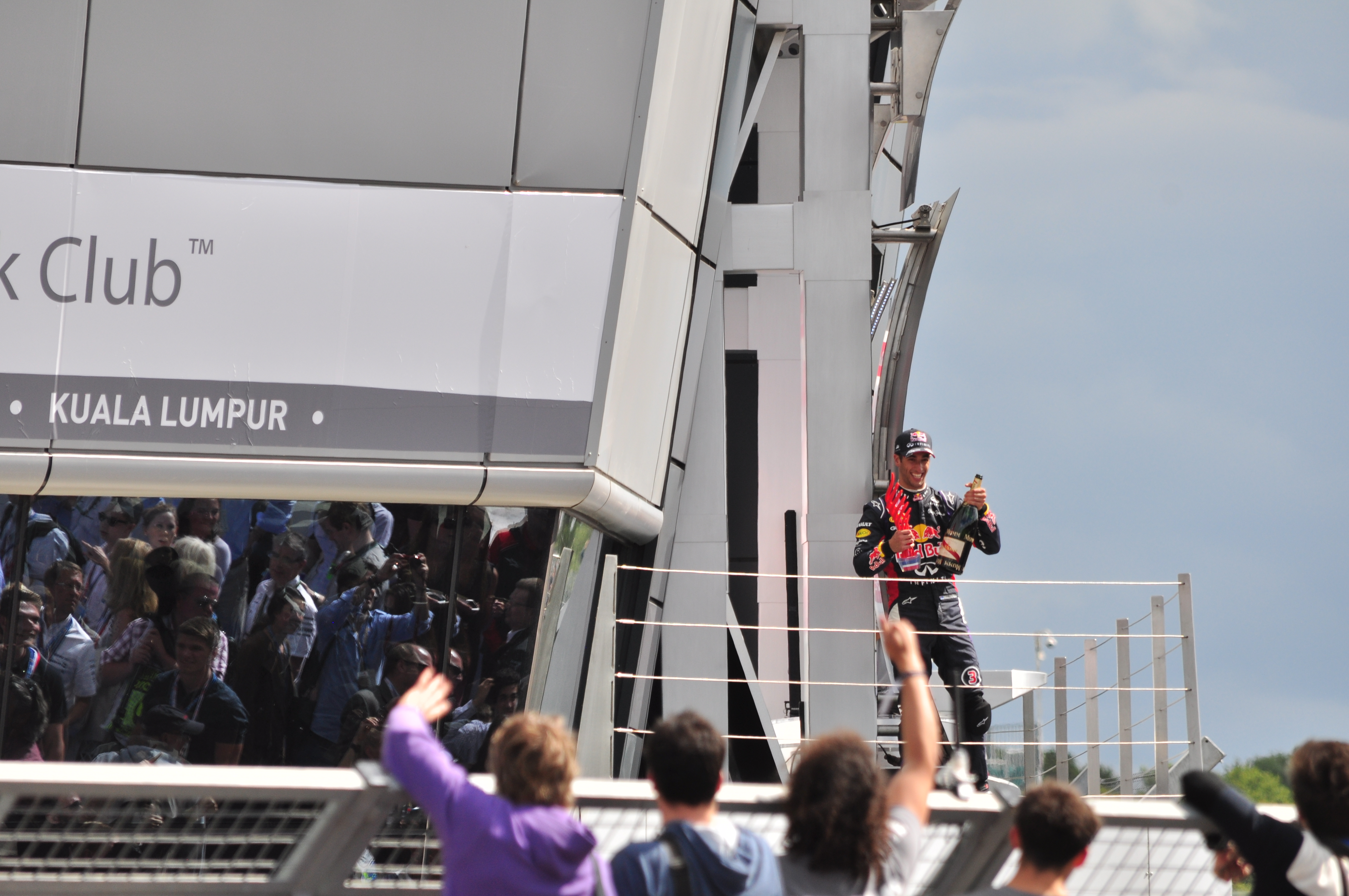
Daniel Ricciardo celebrating finishing in third place on the podium.

At the podium interviews, conducted by double British Grand Prix winner David Coulthard, Hamilton said that his weekend had demonstrated perseverance: "Yesterday wasn't a case of giving up, I didn't think I could do the lap, I was really shocked that the last sector was so fast. But coming here today I had my family with, just focused, the support from the fans, as I said, just spurred me on, and I really couldn't have done it without them." Bottas said he was enjoyed to pass other drivers and was complimentary of his team and car, "The plan was to come as high as possible, as high as the pace of the car is giving the possibility. I think as a team we made the most out of it." Ricciardo spoke of his feeling that had the race lasted one more lap, Button would have passed him. In the subsequent press conference, Hamilton said the fans' positive attitude helped him and that the win had no comparison to his one in 2008 as that race was held on a wet track. Bottas said Williams predicted Mercedes and Red Bull would be strong opponents and the team targeted points not the podium. Ricciardo stated Red Bull restarted on the hard tyres for track position and called his third-place result "one of my best podiums" of the season.

Räikkönen was declared fit for the following German Grand Prix, and said he felt the crash was not his largest and hoped to avoid such incidents in the future. Lauda claimed that the delay to repair the damaged wall was too long, unnecessary, and an over-regulation by Formula One. "This over-nursing of F1, being over cautious, over-controlling and over-regulating, drives me mad. This little guardrail issue is another example. There are too many people involved in making F1 as safe as the roads, which is wrong. They should have fixed it quickly, done something instantly, and then 10–15 minutes later the race would have gone on." Massa stated his belief that Räikkönen might not have crashed had he been more cautious in slowing and remerging onto the track. The FIA rejected suggestions Räikkönen should have been penalised because it decided he did not rejoin unsafely. Whiting responded to Lauda by noting safety was enhanced following Massa's 2009 Hungarian Grand Prix injury from being struck in the helmet by a spring.

Alonso told the press he expected to lose the battle with Vettel because his car's rear-wing aerodynamic deficiencies led it to not operate correctly, and Ferrari contemplated retiring him. "Vettel overtook me by going out of the track. He finished in front, but I was very proud of my 13 laps. If he had not passed me on the lap he did it would have been the next one because we were in slow motion and they were at real speed." Vettel described a series of radio transmissions where he complained of a series of suspected illegal manoeuvres such as driving off the track during his duel as "silly"; "I got the message that I should respect the limits and that he was complaining, so I was doing the same thing. I'm not sure who won the list-keeping. I think twice it was maybe a bit too harsh into Turn 6 [Brooklands], but it was good to get the move at the end." Nevertheless, former driver Allan McNish said on a BBC Sport online column the battle was "some of the best racing you will ever see" and it demonstrated "two world champions having to really work for their living." Gutierrez was found to be "predominantly at fault" for his collision at Club corner on lap line, and incurred a five-place grid penalty for the following German Grand Prix and three penalty points on his super licence.

The result reduced Rosberg's World Drivers' Championship lead to four championship points over Hamilton. Ricciardo's third-place finish increased his championship points tally over fourth-place Alonso to 11 and Bottas' second-place finish advanced him past Vettel and from seventh to fifth. In the World Constructors' Championship, Mercedes maintained its lead with 326 championship points; their advantage over Red Bull remained at 158 championship points. Ferrari stayed third while Williams overtook Force India for fourth with ten races left in the season.

=== Race classification ===
Drivers who scored championship points are denoted in bold.

Pos.	No.	Driver	Constructor	Laps	Time/Retired	Grid	Points
1	44	(United Kingdom) **Lewis Hamilton**	**Mercedes**	52	2:26:52.094	6	25
2	77	(Finland) **Valtteri Bottas**	**Williams-Mercedes**	52	+30.135	14	18
3	3	(Australia) **Daniel Ricciardo**	**Red Bull Racing-Renault**	52	+46.495	8	15
4	22	(United Kingdom) **Jenson Button**	**McLaren-Mercedes**	52	+47.390	3	12
5	1	(Germany) **Sebastian Vettel**	**Red Bull Racing-Renault**	52	+53.864	2	10
6	14	(Spain) **Fernando Alonso**	**Ferrari**	52	+59.946	16	8
7	20	(Denmark) **Kevin Magnussen**	**McLaren-Mercedes**	52	+1:02.563	5	6
8	27	(Germany) **Nico Hülkenberg**	**Force India-Mercedes**	52	+1:28.692	4	4
9	26	(Russia) **Daniil Kvyat**	**Toro Rosso-Renault**	52	+1:29.340	9	2
10	25	(France) **Jean-Éric Vergne**	**Toro Rosso-Renault**	51	+1 lap	10	1
11	11	(Mexico) Sergio Pérez	Force India-Mercedes	51	+1 lap	7	
12	8	(France) Romain Grosjean	Lotus-Renault	51	+1 lap	11	
13	99	(Germany) Adrian Sutil	Sauber-Ferrari	51	+1 lap	13	
14	17	(France) Jules Bianchi	Marussia-Ferrari	51	+1 lap	12	
15	10	(Japan) Kamui Kobayashi	Caterham-Renault	50	+2 laps	22	
16	4	(United Kingdom) Max Chilton	Marussia-Ferrari	50	+2 laps	17	
17	13	(Venezuela) Pastor Maldonado	Lotus-Renault	49	Exhaust^{1}	20	
Ret	6	(Germany) Nico Rosberg	Mercedes	28	Gearbox	1	
Ret	9	(Sweden) Marcus Ericsson	Caterham-Renault	11	Suspension	21	
Ret	21	(Mexico) Esteban Gutiérrez	Sauber-Ferrari	9	Collision damage	19	
Ret	19	(Brazil) Felipe Massa	Williams-Mercedes	0	Collision damage	15	
Ret	7	(Finland) Kimi Räikkönen	Ferrari	0	Accident	18	

==== Notes ====
- **^1** — Pastor Maldonado was classified as he had completed more than 90% of the race distance.

== Championship standings after the race ==
Drivers' Championship standings

+/–	Pos.	Driver	Points
	1	(Germany) Nico Rosberg	165
	2	(United Kingdom) Lewis Hamilton	161
	3	(Australia) Daniel Ricciardo	98
	4	(Spain) Fernando Alonso	87
2	5	(Finland) Valtteri Bottas	73

Constructors' Championship standings

+/–	Pos.	Driver	Points
	1	(Germany) Mercedes	326
	2	(Austria) Red Bull Racing-Renault	168
	3	(Italy) Ferrari	106
1	4	(United Kingdom) Williams-Mercedes	103
1	5	Force India-Mercedes	91
Sources:

- Note: Only the top five positions are included for both sets of standings.

== See also ==
- 2014 Silverstone GP2 Series round
- 2014 Silverstone GP3 Series round

== Footnotes ==
Previous race: 2014 Austrian Grand Prix	FIA Formula One World Championship; 2014 season	Next race: 2014 German Grand Prix
Previous race: 2013 British Grand Prix	British Grand Prix	Next race: 2015 British Grand Prix
