= Jason Somerville (engineer) =

British engineer (born 1968)

- Born: 3 December 1968 (age 57)
- Citizenship: British
- Education: Loughborough University (BEng)
- Occupation: Aerodynamicist
- Employer: Alpine F1 Team
- Title: Deputy Technical Director

Jason Somerville (born 3 December 1968) is a British Formula One and motorsport aerodynamicist. He currently serves as the Deputy Technical Director of the Alpine F1 Team; he was formerly the head of aerodynamics at the FIA.

== Career ==
Somerville studied Automotive Engineering Technology at Loughborough University. He began his engineering career in 1992 as a Project Engineer at HORIBA MIRA, working on vehicle engineering and development projects.

In 1995, he moved into motorsport with Tom Walkinshaw Racing, contributing to aerodynamic development of the race-winning Volvo 850 and S40 touring cars in the British Touring Car Championship. He joined Williams Racing in 1997 as an aerodynamicist, working on sports car aerodynamic programmes, including the BMW V12 LM and Le Mans-winning BMW V12 LMR project. Somerville progressed within the Williams organisation to become Senior Aerodynamicist in the Formula One team between 1999 and 2003, contributing to aerodynamic development of the race-winning Williams FW23, Williams FW24 and championship contender Williams FW25 chassis.

In 2003, he joined Toyota Racing in Cologne as an aerodynamics group leader and senior manager, before being promoted to deputy head of aerodynamics in 2007, supporting the team’s aerodynamic department through its later Formula One seasons. Following Toyota’s withdrawal from Formula One, Somerville moved to the Enstone-based Renault F1 Team in 2010 as aerodynamics project leader. In 2011, he rejoined Williams as head of aerodynamics, leading the department’s development of multiple Formula One cars, including the race-winning Williams FW34 and the Williams FW36 and Williams FW36 which achieved third place in the Constructors’ Championship.

In 2017, Somerville joined Formula One Group as head of aerodynamics, leading the aerodynamic research group responsible for developing the 2022 Formula One technical regulations focused on improving close racing. He transferred to the FIA in 2022 as head of aerodynamics, where he has overseen regulation development and ongoing aerodynamic evolution of Formula One cars across the 2022–2026 regulation cycles.

In late 2025, it was reported that Somerville had departed the FIA and is rumoured to have been signed by the Alpine F1 Team in an undisclosed role. On 15 May 2026, it was confirmed that Alpine had recruited Sommerville, as Deputy Technical Director.
