= Kreisel (surname) =

Kreisel is a surname. Notable people with the surname include:

- Franz Kreisel (1890–1960), German ice hockey player
- Georg Kreisel (1923–2015), Austrian logician
- Hanns Kreisel (1931–2017), German mycologist and academic
- Henry Kreisel (1922–1991), Canadian writer
- Howard Kreisel (born 1951), Scholar of Medieval Jewish Philosophy
- Jens Kreisel (born 1969), German physicist and academic administrator
- Lutz Kreisel (born 1927), German set designer
- Uwe Kreisel (born 1961), German linguistics author

== See also ==
- Kreisel, a turn found on some bobsleigh, luge, and skeleton tracks
- Kriesel, another surname
- Kreisler (disambiguation)
- Krisel (disambiguation)
