= BMW E41 / P80 engine =

BMW E41/P80 engine
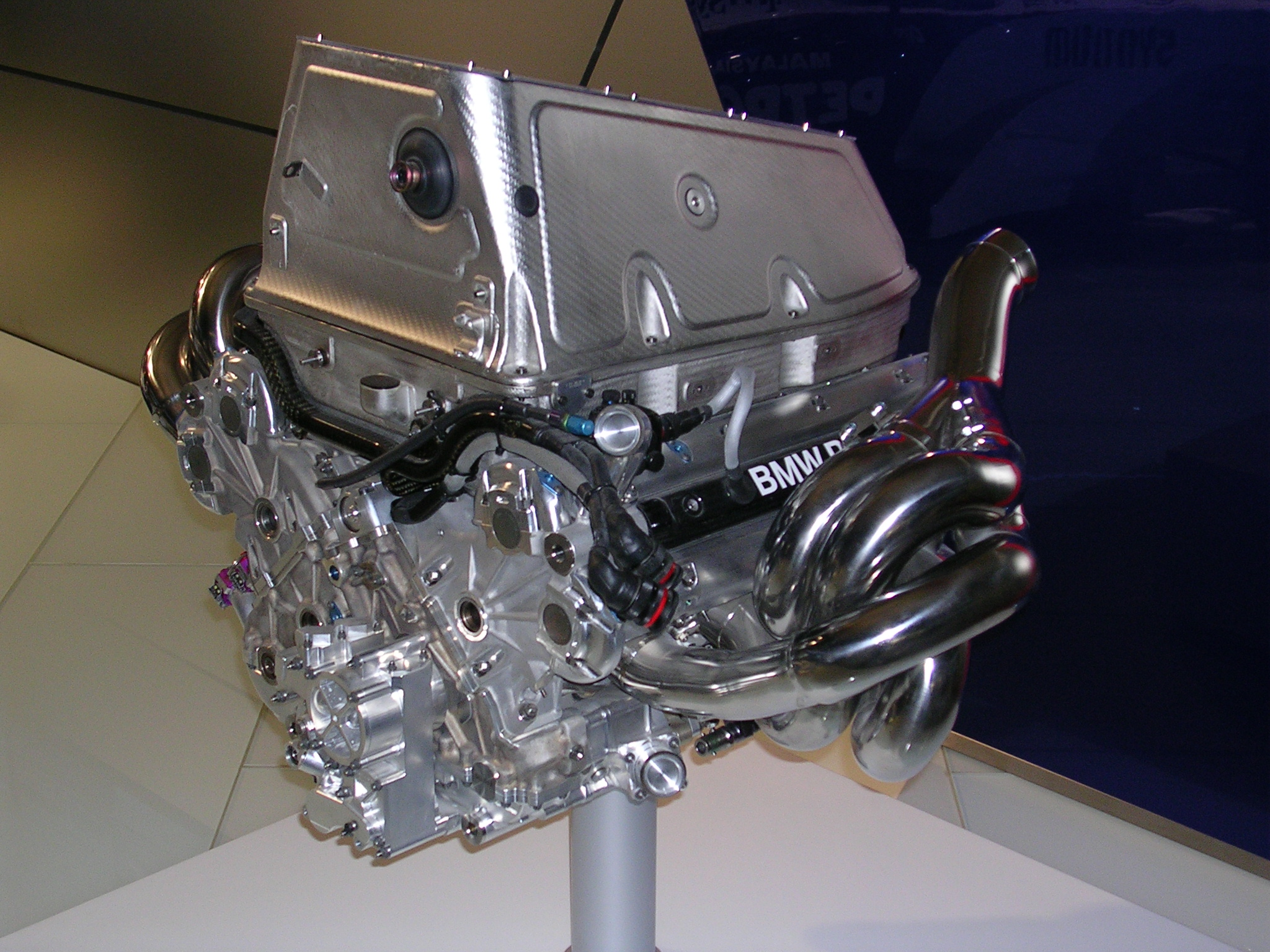

Overview
- Manufacturer: (Germany) BMW
- Designer: Paul Rosche; Werner Laurenz; Heinz Paschen
- Production: 2000–2009

Layout
- Configuration: 72°-90° V10; 90° V8
- Displacement: 3.0 L (2,998 cc); 2.4 L (2,398 cc)
- Cylinder bore: 94 mm (3.7 in); 95 mm (3.7 in); 98 mm (3.9 in)
- Piston stroke: 43.2 mm (1.7 in); 42.3 mm (1.7 in); 39.75 mm (1.6 in)

Combustion
- Fuel system: Electronic fuel injection
- Fuel type: Gasoline
- Cooling system: Water-cooled

Output
- Power output: 760–950 hp (567–708 kW; 771–963 PS)
- Torque output: approx. 220–302 lb⋅ft (298–409 N⋅m)

Dimensions
- Dry weight: 89–130 kg (196.2–286.6 lb)

Chronology
- Predecessor: BMW M12

The BMW E41 and P80 series is a family of naturally-aspirated Formula One racing engines, designed and developed by BMW, and introduced in 2000 in partnership with Williams, and continued through 2006, during their partnership with Sauber.

== Overview ==
=== E41 ===
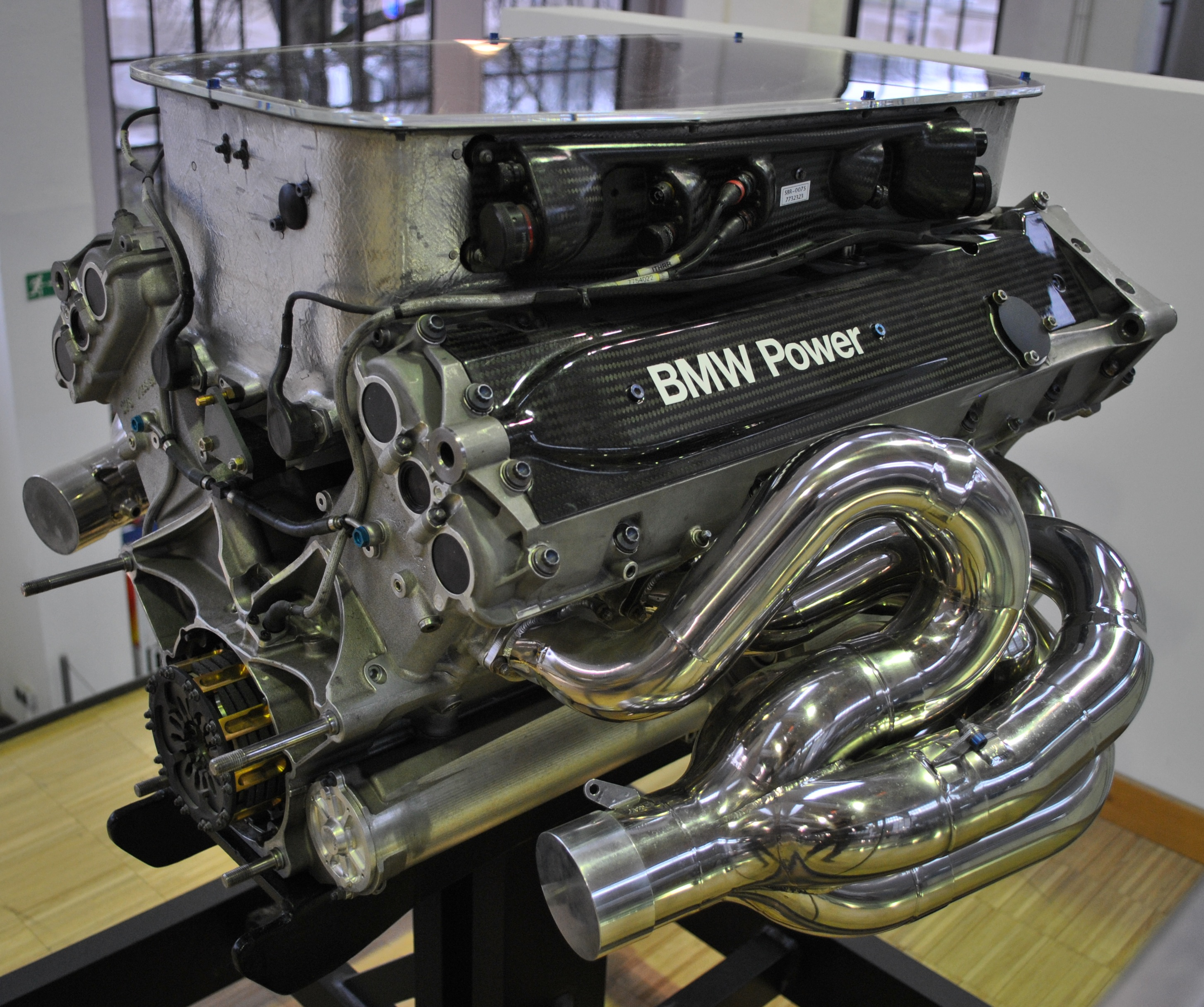
BMW E41/4 engine.

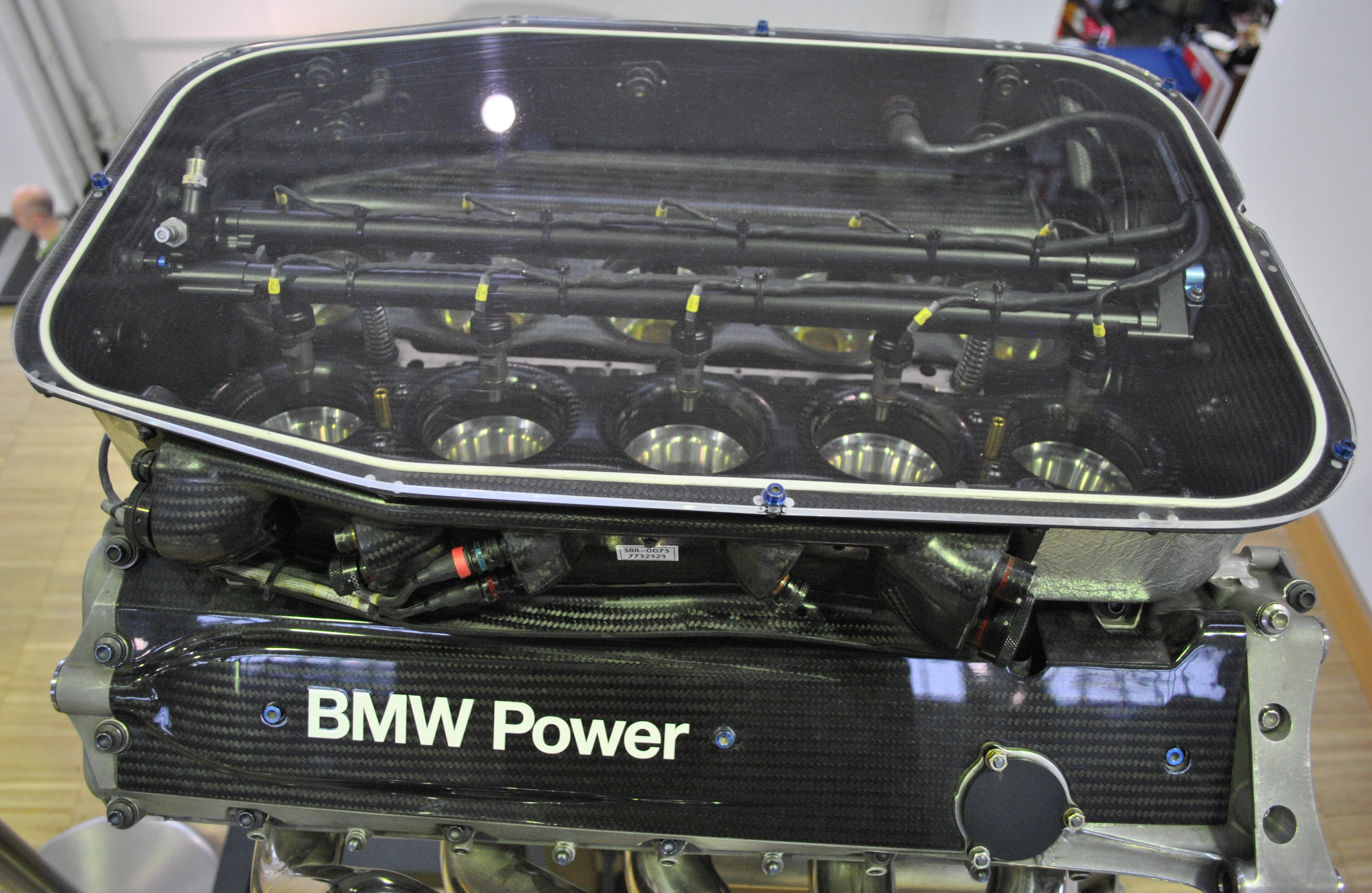
BMW E41/4 engine detail.

The BMW E41 was a Formula One V10 engine manufactured by BMW.

BMW was the engine supplier to the Brabham Formula 1 team from 1982 to 1987. The team became world champion in 1983 with the turbocharged in-line four-cylinder BMW M12/13. In addition to Brabham, ATS, Arrows, and Benetton also drove with BMW engines at times. After BMW officially withdrew from Formula 1 in 1988, the engines were used under the name of the US company Megatron until turbo engines were banned in 1989.

However, BMW did not completely abandon the design of Formula 1 engines. Various naturally aspirated 3.5-litre twelve-cylinder engines emerged. A new regulation prescribed ten-cylinder engines with a maximum displacement of 3 liters, which led to the creation of the BMW E41/2. This formed the basis for the BMW E41/4 V10 engine with a cylinder bank angle of 72°.

The BMW E41/4 was first used in the Williams FW22 on BMW's return to Formula One on 12 March 2000 at the Australian Grand Prix in Melbourne. Ralf Schumacher finished third in this race – it was the best F1 entry by an engine manufacturer in over 30 years.

Internally, the engines were given detailed designations: the BMW E41/4 with the number R39-9, for example, underwent nine revisions, with R standing for racing specification. In its last expansion stage, which was used at the end of the 2000 season, the BMW E41/4 produced around 810 hp (596 kW) at 17,500 rpm. In qualifying, the engine reached a maximum speed of 17,800 rpm. In the 2001 Formula 1 season, the engine was replaced by the BMW P80.

==== Specifications ====
Designation: E41/4R39-9
Displacement: 3.0 liters (2998 cc) V10-72º
Bore × Stroke: 94.0mm × 43.2mm
Valves/cyl.: 4
Cylinder spacing: 107mm
Power @ rpm Max.: 596 kW (810 hp) @ 17,500 rpm
Torque: 350 N.m. (258 lb-ft)
Year: 2000

=== P80 series ===
The BMW P80 series is a naturally aspirated Formula One V10 engine produced by BMW.

BMW had been the engine supplier to the Williams F1 team since 2000. The BMW E41/4 engine at that time was a V10 engine with a cylinder bank angle of 72°.

The P80 engine developed by BMW for the 2002 Formula 1 season was used in the Williams FW24 Formula 1 racing car and, like its predecessor, the BMW P80, had a cylinder bank angle of 90°. The displacement was identical with 2998 cc.

The conception of the P82 was started by a team of fewer than 20 employees in January/February 2001. At that time the P80 had not even made its racing debut. The design phase followed from March to June 2001, and testing of the components began in August. On September 21, 2001, the engine, which consists of a total of almost 5,000 individual parts, ran on the test bench for the first time, and on October 3 it was tested in driving operation for the first time.

When asked about the performance data, the BMW Motorsport Director at the time, Mario Theissen, replied: "Told values such as 19,000 rpm and 900 hp are pure speculation."

In the 2003 Formula 1 season, the engine was replaced by the P83; followed by the P84, and its evolution, the P84/5, in 2004 and 2005.

==== Specifications ====
Designation: P80
Displacement: 3.0 liters (2998 cc) V10-90º
Bore × Stroke: 95mm × 42.3mm
Valves/cyl.: 4
Cylinder spacing: 103.5mm
Power @ rpm Max.: 656 kW (880 hp) @ 18,000 rpm
Torque: 350 N.m. (258 lb-ft)
Year: 2001

== Background ==
=== Williams (2000–2005) ===
After a ten-year absence from Formula One, BMW began evaluating a return to the sport in the late 1990s. In 1998, the marque signed a contract to supply the Williams team with engines. Williams had won the 1992, 1993, 1996 and 1997 Drivers' Championships, and the Constructors' Championships in all of these years as well as 1994, in a successful partnership with Renault, but the French company withdrew from the sport at the end of 1997, leaving team owner Frank Williams and Technical Director Patrick Head in need of a new engine partnership to remain competitive. As BMW spent 18 months building and testing a normally aspirated, three-litre V10 engine to comply with technical regulations that had changed significantly since the 1980s, the team used old Renault engines rebadged as first Mecachrome and then Supertec.

BMW's E41 engine was ready to compete in the 2000 season, fitted in the FW22 and driven by Ralf Schumacher and Jenson Button. Schumacher scored a podium finish in the engine's first race, and added two more during the course of the season. A series of consistent points-scoring finishes meant that Williams finished a competitive third in the Constructors' Championship, some distance behind the dominant Ferrari and McLaren teams, but ahead of engine manufacturers with more recent experience.

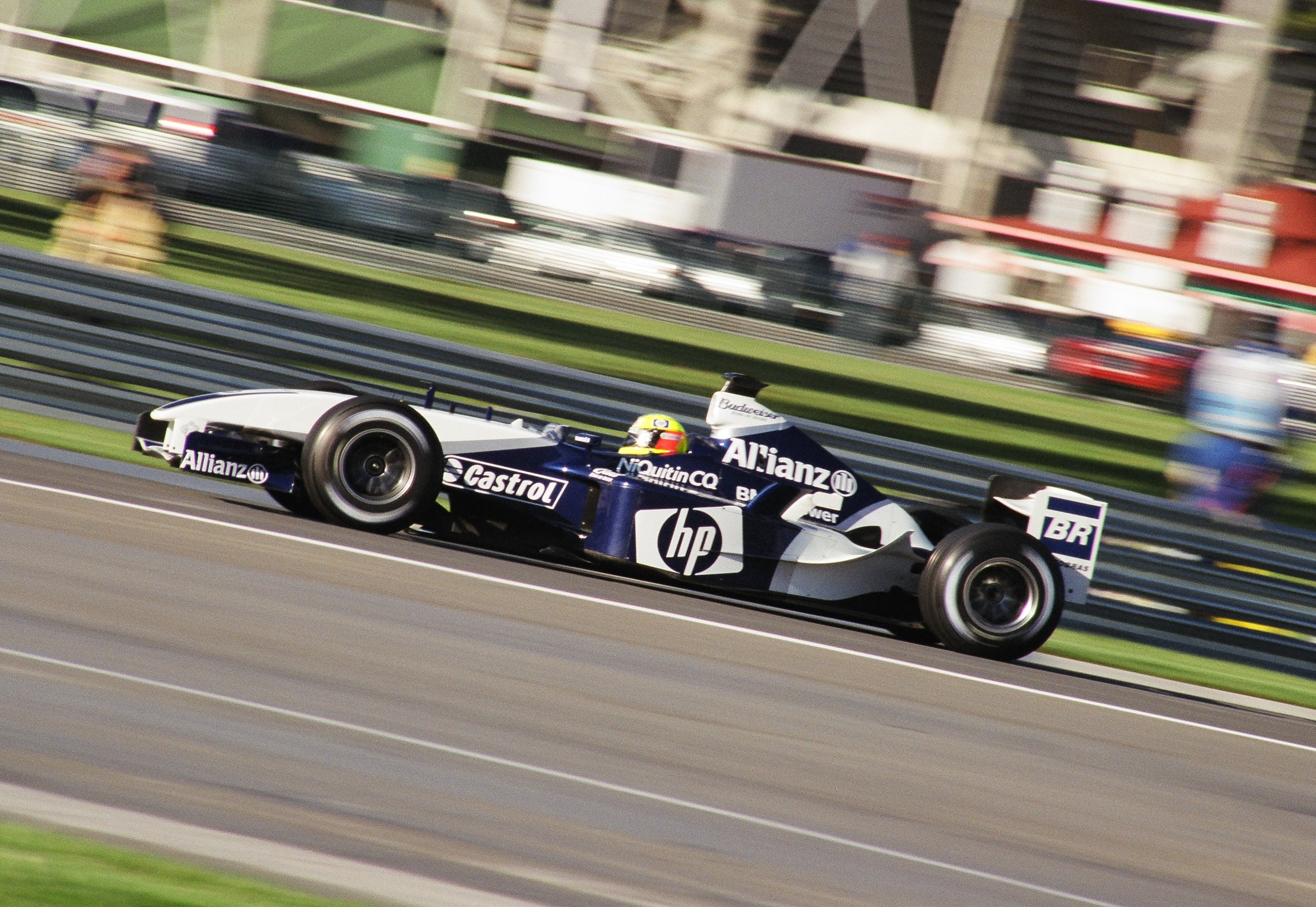
The most successful year of the BMW-Williams collaboration was 2003, but still resulted in neither championship being won.

After the relatively conservative E41, BMW designed the more aggressive P80 engine for 2001, a basic type number that was maintained for the remainder of the company's involvement in Formula One. The engine immediately proved to have a significant power improvement, and propelled Schumacher and new teammate Juan Pablo Montoya into contention for race victories. In all, the two drivers scored four race wins, but lost other opportunities through unreliability and racing incidents. The FW23 chassis also lacked the ultimate downforce to compete with the Ferrari and McLaren drivers at every circuit, although it was the class of the field at "power circuits" such as Hockenheim and Monza.

For 2002, the reliability and consistency of the FW24 chassis was much improved, but Ferrari made a more significant step forward with its own F2002 chassis and dominated both championships. The team scored twelve more points than in the previous year and beat McLaren to second place in the Constructors' Championship, but only won a single race with Schumacher at the Malaysian Grand Prix. Moreover, Montoya was unable to win a single race, despite taking seven pole positions.

The Williams team was more competitive in 2003, as both drivers won on two occasions and Montoya remained in contention for the Drivers' Championship until the penultimate race of the season. However, he ultimately fell short, as did the team in the Constructors' Championship, as although the FW25 was often the car to beat in the second half of the season, it took too much time to reach this point.

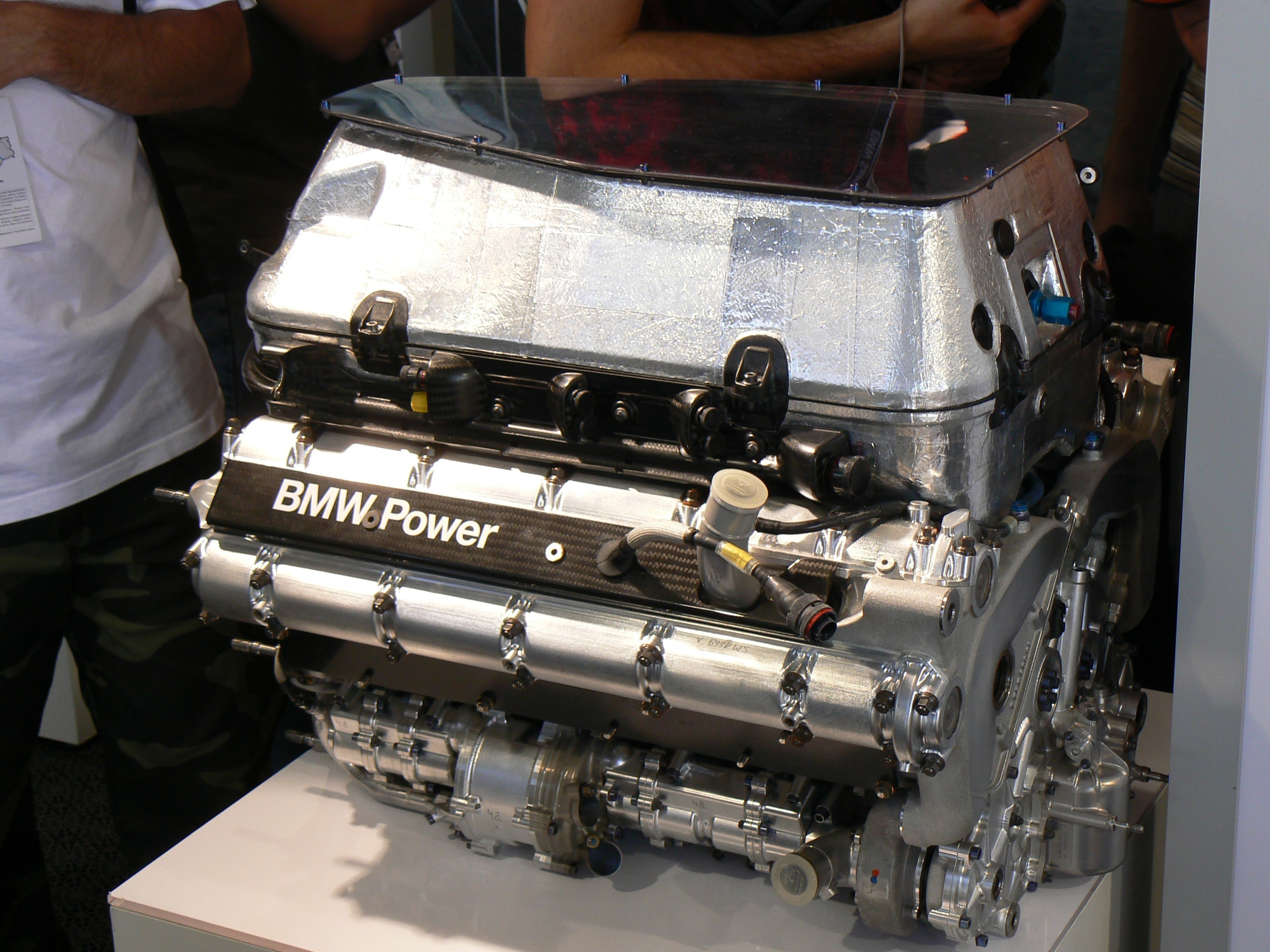
2005 BMW P84/5 3.0 V10 engine.

For 2004, the team produced the FW26 chassis, which featured a radical nose section designed by Antonia Terzi. This design proved ineffective, however, in another year of Ferrari dominance, and Williams slipped to fourth in the Constructors' Championship, with Montoya's victory in the Brazilian Grand Prix its sole win in the 2004 season. Before this result, the team had suffered the embarrassment of a double disqualification from the Canadian Grand Prix due to brake duct irregularities, and then Schumacher sustaining spinal injuries as a result of a high-speed crash at the United States Grand Prix, which caused him to miss six races until he recovered. Both drivers left the team at the end of the season.

The final year of BMW's association with Williams, 2005, saw the team's decline in competitiveness continue, dropping to fifth in the Constructors' Championship. None of the team's three drivers—Mark Webber, Nick Heidfeld and Antônio Pizzonia—were able to win a race; the team's best result was a double podium finish at the Monaco Grand Prix. By this time, the team's relationship with its engine supplier had deteriorated, with BMW believing that its engines were capable of winning championships but were being let down by the Williams chassis they were powering. BMW offered to buy the team outright in the hope of gaining overall control of its Formula One endeavours, but Frank Williams refused; as a result, BMW chose to buy the rival Sauber team instead for 2006, and end its deal with Williams.

=== BMW Sauber (2006–2009) ===
BMW Sauber
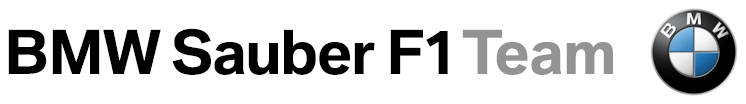
- Full name: BMW Sauber F1 Team
- Base: Hinwil, Switzerland
- Noted staff: Mario Theissen; Peter Sauber; Willy Rampf
- Noted drivers: (Germany) Nick Heidfeld (Poland) Robert Kubica (Germany) Sebastian Vettel (Canada) Jacques Villeneuve

Formula One World Championship career
- First entry: 2006 Bahrain Grand Prix
- Races entered: 70
- Constructors' Championships: 0 (Best finish: 2nd – 2007)
- Drivers' Championships: 0 (Best finish: 4th – Robert Kubica, 2008)
- Race victories: 1
- Podiums: 17
- Pole positions: 1
- Fastest laps: 2
- Final entry: 2009 Abu Dhabi Grand Prix

BMW bought Swiss team Sauber in June 2005 to form the BMW Sauber F1 Team. The takeover came after BMW's relationship with Williams had deteriorated in the previous months, the partnership ending at the end of the 2005 season. The team, operated under a German racing licence, was based at Sauber's headquarters in Hinwil, Switzerland and BMW's headquarters in Munich, Germany.

The team scored two podium finishes and came fifth in 2006, its first season in Formula One. This was followed by a second place in 2007 after the McLaren team had been excluded from the championship. Robert Kubica took the team's only Grand Prix victory at the 2008 Canadian Grand Prix. Following a poor 2009 season, BMW withdrew from Formula One and sold the team back to founder Peter Sauber.

=== 2006 ===
For the 2006 season, BMW Sauber signed Nick Heidfeld from Williams to be the lead driver, while 1997 World Champion Jacques Villeneuve had his existing two-year contract with Sauber honoured. Robert Kubica was signed as the team's third driver. The team continued to use Sauber's facilities, mostly for chassis construction and wind tunnel testing, while BMW's headquarters in Munich was responsible for building the new 2.4-litre P86 V8 engine, revised technical regulations forcing a change from the 3-litre V10 formula. This replaced the Petronas-badged Ferrari engines which the team had used since 1997. The Sauber team's existing major sponsors, Petronas and Credit Suisse, renewed their contracts with BMW. The team also announced a technical partnership with technology company Intel. The team's new livery, which was maintained throughout its tenure in Formula One, consisted of the traditional BMW blue and white with a hint of red.

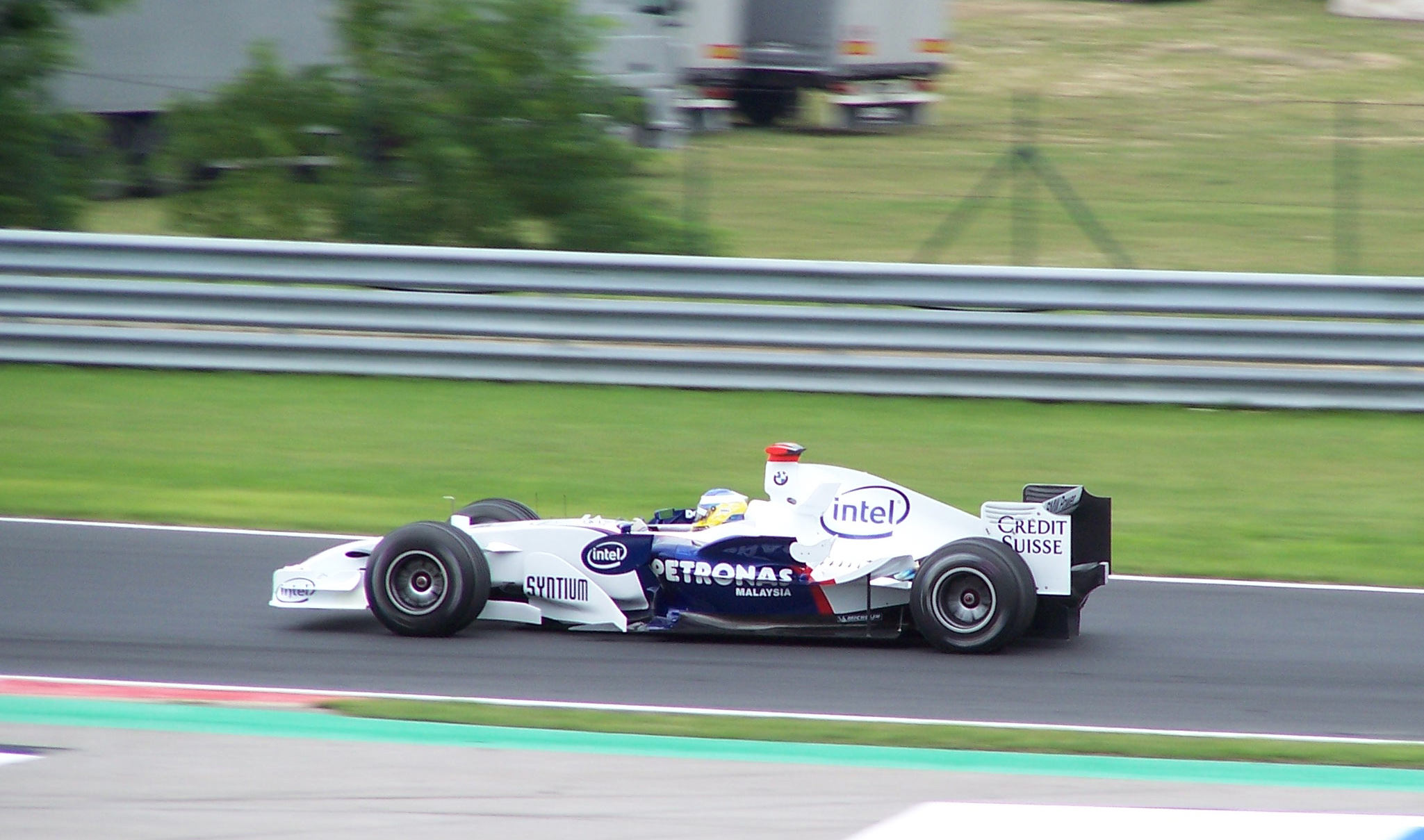
Nick Heidfeld took the team's first podium finish at the 2006 Hungarian Grand Prix.

Villeneuve scored the team's first points with a seventh-place finish at the Malaysian Grand Prix, after Heidfeld retired from fifth with an engine failure late in the race. Over the first two-thirds of the season the drivers picked up points with a succession of seventh and eighth-place finishes, plus a fourth-place finish for Heidfeld at the Australian Grand Prix. The team ran a radical "twin towers" aero enhancement on the front of the car for the French Grand Prix, which was meant to improve the flow of air over the top of the chassis. The parts were promptly banned by the Fédération Internationale de l'Automobile (FIA) as they were adjudged to impede the drivers' vision and thus compromise safety.

Heidfeld scored the team's first podium finish at the Hungarian Grand Prix from tenth on the grid. This race also saw the début of Robert Kubica, who replaced Villeneuve after the latter had crashed heavily at the preceding German Grand Prix. Kubica had a decent performance and finished seventh, only to later be disqualified after his car was found to be underweight. The official reason for Villeneuve's absence was that he was recovering from his previous accident, but the team later announced that the driver change was permanent. Kubica scored BMW Sauber's second podium finish of the season at the Italian Grand Prix, after running in third place for most of the race and leading briefly during the first round of pit stops while Heidfeld finished in eighth. The team scored a total of 36 points to finish fifth in the Constructors' Championship, an improvement on Sauber's eighth position with 20 points in 2005.

=== 2007 ===
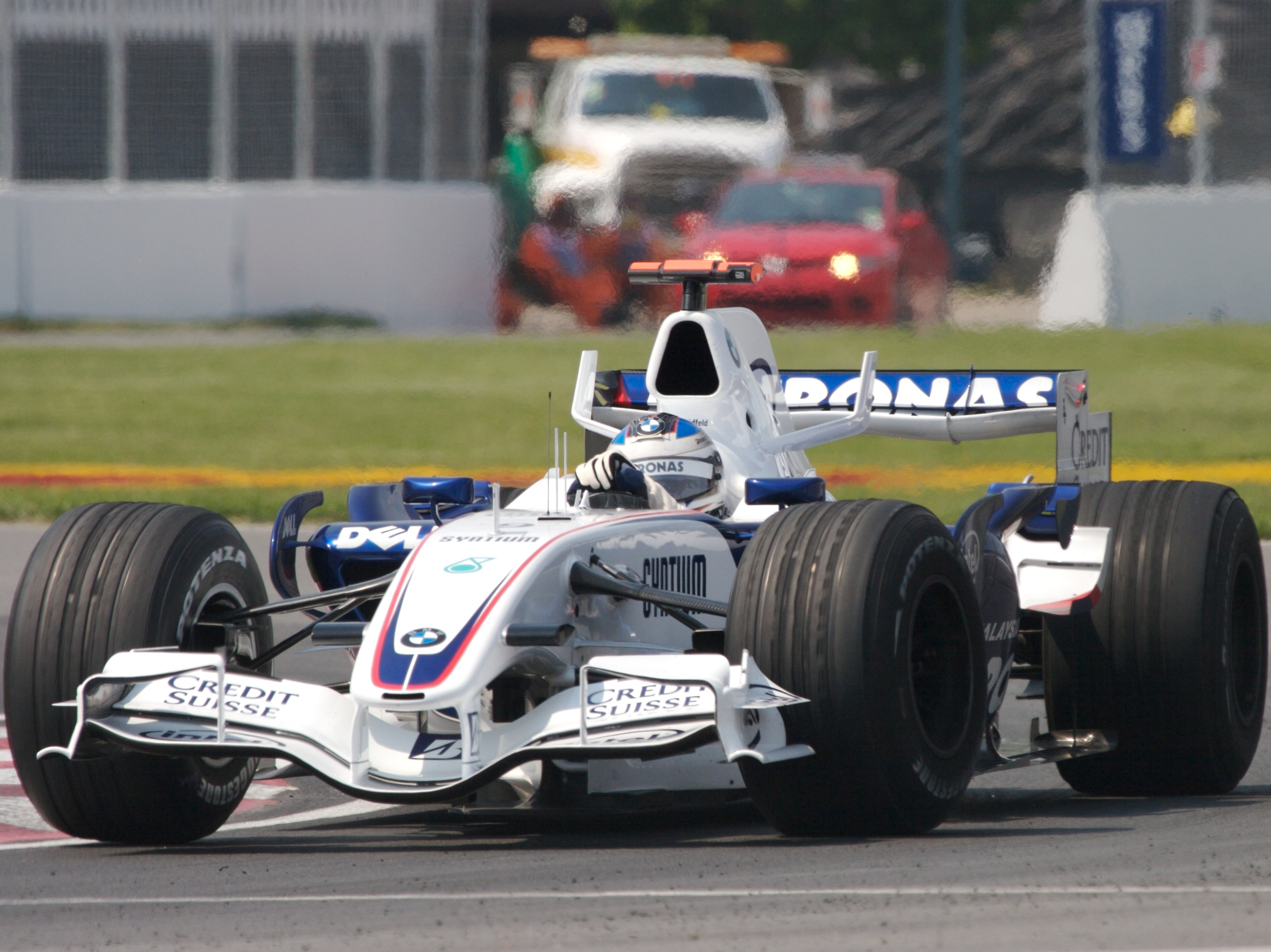
Heidfeld took BMW Sauber's best result of 2007 with second place at the Canadian Grand Prix.

On 19 October 2006, BMW announced that Robert Kubica would partner Nick Heidfeld for the 2007 Formula One season with Sebastian Vettel taking the test and reserve driver role. Timo Glock was later signed as the team's second test driver. The team launched its 2007 car, the F1.07, on January 16, 2007.

The new car showed promising form throughout winter testing, topping the time sheets on occasions. However, team principal Mario Theissen declared some reliability concerns before the season's opening race in Australia. Kubica retired from fourth place with a gearbox problem, but Heidfeld took over the position and held it to the end of the race. In the early races of the season, Heidfeld and Kubica scored a series of points finishes and established BMW Sauber as the third-fastest team, behind Ferrari and McLaren. Theissen also made the point that the performance gap between BMW Sauber and the two top teams was less than the gap between BMW Sauber and the teams behind it.

The Canadian Grand Prix brought mixed fortunes for the team. While Heidfeld scored BMW Sauber's best result thus far with a second-place finish, Kubica suffered a huge crash that resulted in a long safety car period. The media was initially told Kubica had broken his leg, but it later proved that he had escaped with only a sprained ankle and concussion. Vettel took his place in the United States Grand Prix, finishing in eighth place and therefore becoming the youngest driver to score a Formula One World Championship point. Later in the season, Vettel moved teams to take a race seat at the Toro Rosso team.

Kubica returned to racing action at the French Grand Prix and proved his recovery by finishing in fourth position. Over the remainder of the season, he and Heidfeld continued their form to score a total of 101 points, which secured the team second in the Constructors' Championship after McLaren's disqualification. Heidfeld scored another podium finish at the Hungarian Grand Prix and scored 61 points to Kubica's 39, while Vettel's sole appearance produced an additional point.

=== 2008 ===
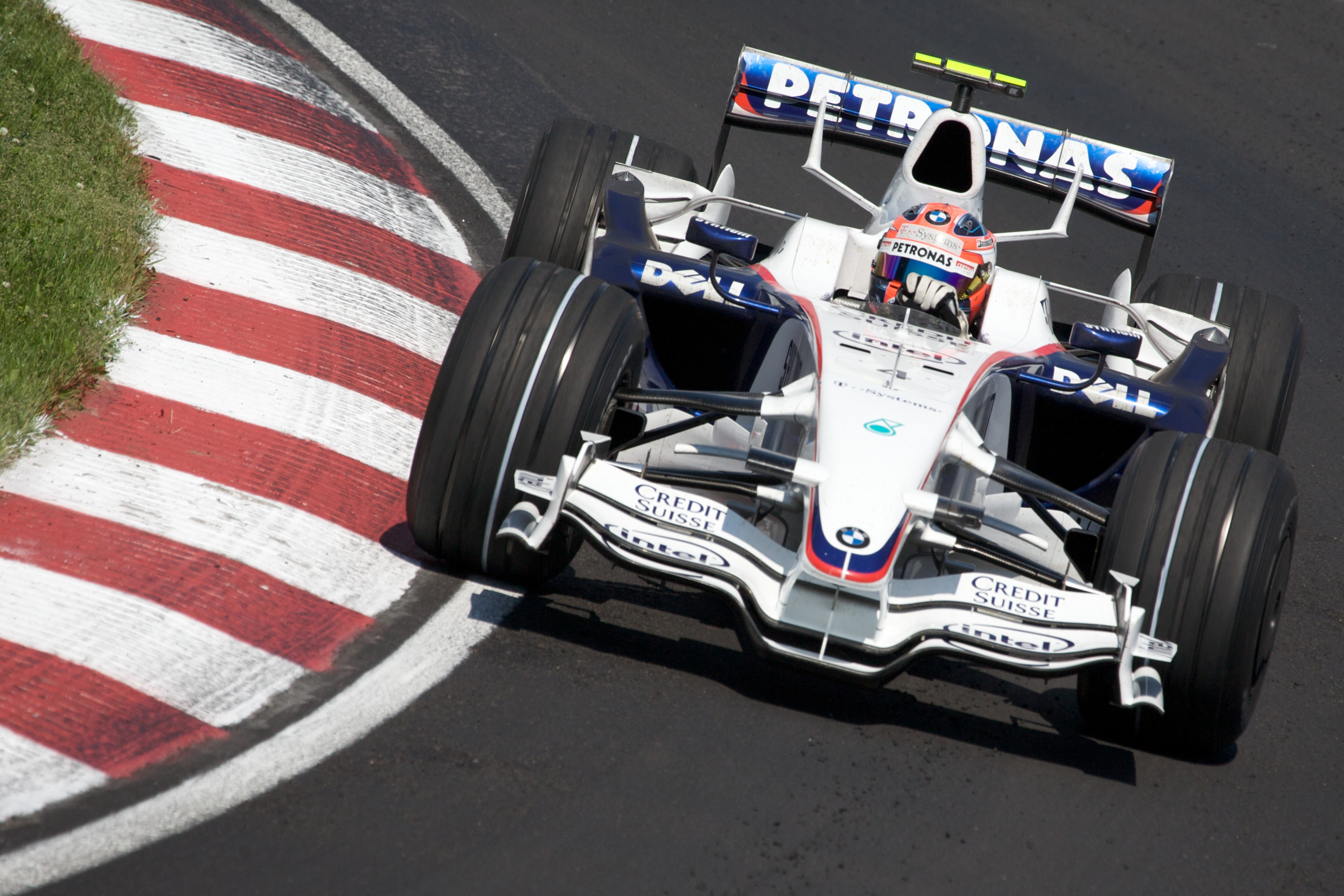
The Canadian Grand Prix saw Robert Kubica win his and BMW Sauber's first race.

On August 21, 2007, BMW confirmed its driver line-up of Heidfeld and Kubica for the 2008 season. Their 2008 car, the F1.08 was officially launched in Munich at BMW Welt on January 14, 2008. It made its track debut at Valencia the next day, with Robert Kubica driving. Team principal Mario Theissen set the target of the team's first win.

BMW Sauber started the season well with Kubica narrowly missing out on pole after a mistake in his main qualifying lap in Melbourne. He later retired after being hit by Kazuki Nakajima but Heidfeld finished second. Kubica took second in Malaysia, with Heidfeld in 6th setting the fastest lap of the race. The team's points total of 11 was their largest score up to that time. In Bahrain, Kubica scored his and the team's first-ever pole position, beating Felipe Massa by just under three-hundredths of a second. The team went on to finish 3rd and 4th in the race, equalling their highest round points total and promoting them to first place in the constructors' championship for the first time.

The team also attained a second-place finish in the Monaco Grand Prix with Robert Kubica, beating both Ferraris and only trailing the McLaren of Lewis Hamilton by three seconds.

BMW Sauber's first race victory came in the 2008 Canadian Grand Prix, the team achieving a one-two finish with Robert Kubica's first race win and Nick Heidfeld taking second place. The victory came after Lewis Hamilton collided with Kimi Räikkönen in the pitlane, ending the race for both drivers. Kubica was on a different refueling strategy from Heidfeld, who also briefly led the race before securing the one-two finish for BMW Sauber in a comfortable fashion.

After the team's breakthrough win, development was switched to the 2009 season where new regulations come into play. This greatly annoyed Kubica, (who was leading the championship after the Canadian Grand Prix), as he felt they could have had a realistic chance of taking at least one title. The lack of development was reflected with a drop of form throughout the second half of the season, causing BMW to be outpaced by Renault, Toyota, and even Toro Rosso (who started the season as one of the slowest teams) by the end of the season. Despite this, Kubica remained with an outside chance of taking the drivers championship until the Chinese Grand Prix, the 17th round out of 18.

In October the team confirmed that they would stick with Robert Kubica and Nick Heidfeld as their drivers for the 2009 Season.

=== 2009 ===
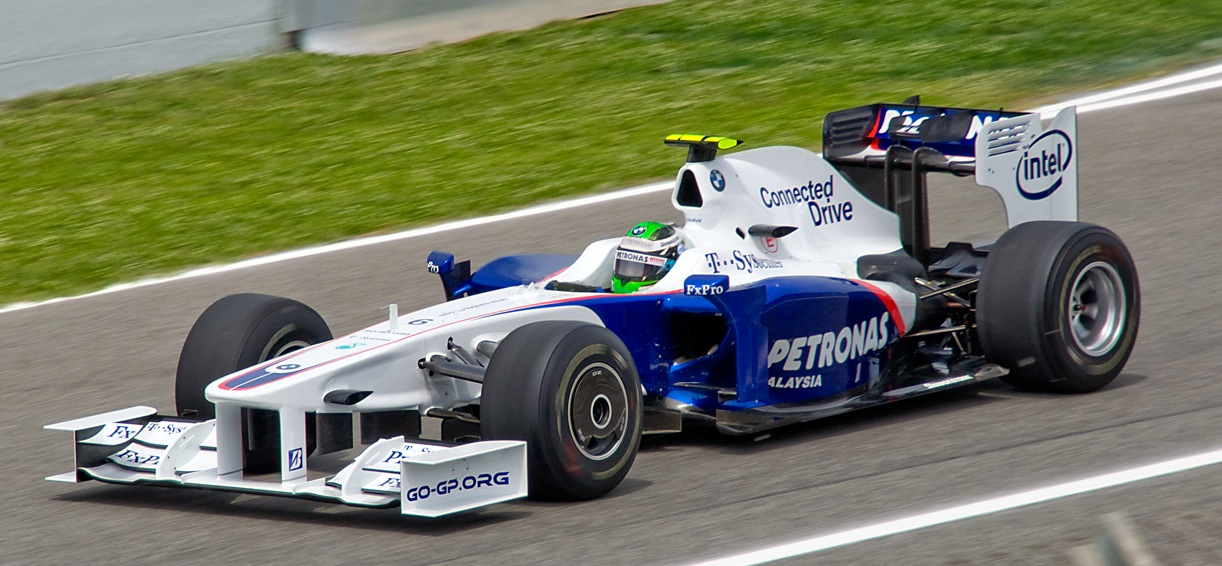
The poor performance of the F1.09 chassis contributed to BMW's withdrawal from Formula One at the end of the season.

Although BMW Sauber targeted the 2009 season as the year they would challenge for the title, their start to the season was a disappointment. Kubica was running in 3rd place in the opening round when he collided with Vettel while battling for 2nd place and was forced to retire. Heidfeld then secured the team's first podium of the year in Malaysia, but after 6 races BMW Sauber had collected a mere 6 points, and occupied 8th place in the Constructors' Championship out of 10 teams. A raft of upgrades was set for Turkey, including an improved regenerative braking system (KERS) and a double-deck diffuser. While the new diffuser was implemented, the KERS could not be made to fit the new car and both drivers raced without the device. After the qualifying session for the British Grand Prix Mario Theissen announced that the team had decided to halt further development KERS; of which BMW had been one of the strongest proponents, and focus instead on improving the car's aerodynamics. This left Ferrari and McLaren as the only remaining users of the KERS system. In the European Grand Prix at Valencia Robert Kubica scored the team's first points since the race in Turkey.

Following a meeting of the BMW board on July 28, the company held at press conference the following morning in which it confirmed the team's withdrawal from Formula One at the end of 2009. Chairman Norbert Reithofer described the decision as a strategic one. The Formula One Teams Association released a statement in response pledging its support to help the team remain in F1.

On 15 September 2009, it was announced that BMW Sauber had secured a buyer, Qadbak Investments Limited which said to represent European and Middle Eastern interests. However Lotus had been given the 13th and final slot in the 2010 Championship. The team were awarded what was termed a 14th entry, which hinged either on another team dropping out or all the other teams agreeing to allow 28 cars to enter the 2010 Championship.

On November 22, Swiss newspaper SonntagsZeitung revealed that Qadbak's attempt to purchase the team had failed as it did not have the necessary funds. Qadbak turned out to be a shell company with no assets and no investors behind it. On November 27, 2009, it was announced that Peter Sauber would repurchase the team conditional upon the team receiving a FIA entry for the 2010 season. The FIA subsequently granted Sauber an entry on December 3. The team used Ferrari engines in 2010.

== Complete Formula One results ==
(key)

Year	Entrant	Chassis	Engine	Tyres	Drivers	1	2	3	4	5	6	7	8	9	10	11	12	13	14	15	16	17	18	19	WCC	Points
2000	BMW WilliamsF1 Team	Williams FW22	E41 3.0 V10	B		AUS	BRA	SMR	GBR	ESP	EUR	MON	CAN	FRA	AUT	GER	HUN	BEL	ITA	USA	JPN	MAL			3rd	36
2000	BMW WilliamsF1 Team	Williams FW22	E41 3.0 V10	B	(Germany) Ralf Schumacher	3	5	Ret	4	4	Ret	Ret	14^{†}	5	Ret	7	5	3	3	Ret	Ret	Ret			3rd	36
2000	BMW WilliamsF1 Team	Williams FW22	E41 3.0 V10	B	(United Kingdom) Jenson Button	Ret	6	Ret	5	17^{†}	10^{†}	Ret	11	8	5	4	9	5	Ret	Ret	5	Ret			3rd	36
2001	BMW WilliamsF1 Team	Williams FW23	P80 3.0 V10	MI		AUS	MAL	BRA	SMR	ESP	AUT	MON	CAN	EUR	FRA	GBR	GER	HUN	BEL	ITA	USA	JPN			3rd	80
2001	BMW WilliamsF1 Team	Williams FW23	P80 3.0 V10	MI	(Germany) Ralf Schumacher	Ret	5	Ret^{F}	1^{F}	Ret	Ret	Ret	1^{F}	4	2^{P}	Ret	1	4	8	3^{F}	Ret	6^{F}			3rd	80
2001	BMW WilliamsF1 Team	Williams FW23	P80 3.0 V10	MI	(Colombia) Juan Pablo Montoya	Ret	Ret	Ret	Ret	2	Ret	Ret	Ret	2^{F}	Ret	4	Ret^{P}^{F}	8	Ret^{P}	1^{P}	Ret^{F}	2			3rd	80
2002	BMW WilliamsF1 Team	Williams FW24	P82 3.0 V10	MI		AUS	MAL	BRA	SMR	ESP	AUT	MON	CAN	EUR	GBR	FRA	GER	HUN	BEL	ITA	USA	JPN			2nd	92
2002	BMW WilliamsF1 Team	Williams FW24	P82 3.0 V10	MI	(Germany) Ralf Schumacher	Ret	1	2	3	11^{†}	4	3	7	4	8	5	3	3	5	Ret	16	11^{†}			2nd	92
2002	BMW WilliamsF1 Team	Williams FW24	P82 3.0 V10	MI	(Colombia) Juan Pablo Montoya	2	2^{F}	5^{P}^{F}	4	2	3	Ret^{P}	Ret^{P}^{F}	Ret^{P}	3^{P}	4^{P}	2	11	3	Ret^{P}	4	4			2nd	92
2003	BMW WilliamsF1 Team	Williams FW25	P83 3.0 V10	MI		AUS	MAL	BRA	SMR	ESP	AUT	MON	CAN	EUR	FRA	GBR	GER	HUN	ITA	USA	JPN				2nd	144
2003	BMW WilliamsF1 Team	Williams FW25	P83 3.0 V10	MI	(Colombia) Juan Pablo Montoya	2	12	Ret	7	4	Ret	1	3	2	2^{F}	2	1^{P}^{F}	3^{F}	2	6	Ret				2nd	144
2003	BMW WilliamsF1 Team	Williams FW25	P83 3.0 V10	MI	(Germany) Ralf Schumacher	8	4	7	4	5	6	4^{P}	2^{P}	1	1^{P}	9	Ret	4	PO	Ret	12^{F}				2nd	144
2003	BMW WilliamsF1 Team	Williams FW25	P83 3.0 V10	MI	(Spain) Marc Gené														5						2nd	144
2004	BMW WilliamsF1 Team	Williams FW26	P84 3.0 V10	MI		AUS	MAL	BHR	SMR	ESP	MON	EUR	CAN	USA	FRA	GBR	GER	HUN	BEL	ITA	CHN	JPN	BRA		4th	88
2004	BMW WilliamsF1 Team	Williams FW26	P84 3.0 V10	MI	(Colombia) Juan Pablo Montoya	5	2^{F}	13	3	Ret	4	8	DSQ	DSQ	8	5	5	4	Ret	5	5	7	1^{F}		4th	88
2004	BMW WilliamsF1 Team	Williams FW26	P84 3.0 V10	MI	(Germany) Ralf Schumacher	4	Ret	7	7	6	10^{†}	Ret	DSQ^{P}	Ret							Ret	2	5		4th	88
2004	BMW WilliamsF1 Team	Williams FW26	P84 3.0 V10	MI	(Spain) Marc Gené										10	12									4th	88
2004	BMW WilliamsF1 Team	Williams FW26	P84 3.0 V10	MI	(Brazil) Antônio Pizzonia												7	7	Ret	7					4th	88
2005	BMW WilliamsF1 Team	Williams FW27	P84/5 3.0 V10	MI		AUS	MAL	BHR	SMR	ESP	MON	EUR	CAN	USA	FRA	GBR	GER	HUN	TUR	ITA	BEL	BRA	JPN	CHN	5th	66
2005	BMW WilliamsF1 Team	Williams FW27	P84/5 3.0 V10	MI	(Australia) Mark Webber	5	Ret	6	7	6	3	Ret	5	DNS	12	11	NC	7	Ret	14	4	NC	4	7	5th	66
2005	BMW WilliamsF1 Team	Williams FW27	P84/5 3.0 V10	MI	(Germany) Nick Heidfeld	Ret	3	Ret	6	10	2	2^{P}	Ret	DNS	14	12	11	6	Ret	PO					5th	66
2005	BMW WilliamsF1 Team	Williams FW27	P84/5 3.0 V10	MI	(Brazil) Antônio Pizzonia															7	15^{†}	Ret	Ret	13^{†}	5th	66
2006	BMW Sauber F1 Team	BMW Sauber F1.06	P86 2.4 V8	MI		BHR	MAL	AUS	SMR	EUR	ESP	MON	GBR	CAN	USA	FRA	GER	HUN	TUR	ITA	CHN	JPN	BRA		5th	36
2006	BMW Sauber F1 Team	BMW Sauber F1.06	P86 2.4 V8	MI	(Germany) Nick Heidfeld	12	Ret	4	13	10	8	7	7	7	Ret	8	Ret	3	14	8	7	8	17^{†}		5th	36
2006	BMW Sauber F1 Team	BMW Sauber F1.06	P86 2.4 V8	MI	(Canada) Jacques Villeneuve	Ret	7	6	12	8	12	14	8	Ret	Ret	11	Ret								5th	36
2006	BMW Sauber F1 Team	BMW Sauber F1.06	P86 2.4 V8	MI	(Poland) Robert Kubica													DSQ	12	3	13	9	9		5th	36
2007	BMW Sauber F1 Team	BMW Sauber F1.07	P86/7 2.4 V8	B		AUS	MAL	BHR	ESP	MON	CAN	USA	FRA	GBR	EUR	HUN	TUR	ITA	BEL	JPN	CHN	BRA			2nd	101
2007	BMW Sauber F1 Team	BMW Sauber F1.07	P86/7 2.4 V8	B	(Germany) Nick Heidfeld	4	4	4	Ret	6	2	Ret	5	6	6	3	4	4	5	14^{†}	7	6			2nd	101
2007	BMW Sauber F1 Team	BMW Sauber F1.07	P86/7 2.4 V8	B	(Poland) Robert Kubica	Ret	18	6	4	5	Ret		4	4	7	5	8	5	9	7	Ret	5			2nd	101
2007	BMW Sauber F1 Team	BMW Sauber F1.07	P86/7 2.4 V8	B	(Germany) Sebastian Vettel							8													2nd	101
2008	BMW Sauber F1 Team	BMW Sauber F1.08	P86/8 2.4 V8	B		AUS	MAL	BHR	ESP	TUR	MON	CAN	FRA	GBR	GER	HUN	EUR	BEL	ITA	SIN	JPN	CHN	BRA		3rd	135
2008	BMW Sauber F1 Team	BMW Sauber F1.08	P86/8 2.4 V8	B	(Germany) Nick Heidfeld	2	6^{F}	4	9	5	14	2	13	2	4^{F}	10	9	2	5	6	9	5	10		3rd	135
2008	BMW Sauber F1 Team	BMW Sauber F1.08	P86/8 2.4 V8	B	(Poland) Robert Kubica	Ret	2	3^{P}	4	4	2	1	5	Ret	7	8	3	6	3	11	2	6	11		3rd	135
2009	BMW Sauber F1 Team	BMW Sauber F1.09	P86/9 2.4 V8	B		AUS	MAL	CHN	BHR	ESP	MON	TUR	GBR	GER	HUN	EUR	BEL	ITA	SIN	JPN	BRA	ABU			6th	36
2009	BMW Sauber F1 Team	BMW Sauber F1.09	P86/9 2.4 V8	B	(Poland) Robert Kubica	14^{†}	Ret	13	18	11	Ret	7	13	14	13	8	4	Ret	8	9	2	10			6th	36
2009	BMW Sauber F1 Team	BMW Sauber F1.09	P86/9 2.4 V8	B	(Germany) Nick Heidfeld	10	2^{‡}	12	19	7	11	11	15	10	11	11	5	7	Ret	6	Ret	5			6th	36

== Formula One World Championship results ==
- 11 race wins.
- 17 pole positions.
- 62 podium finishes

== See also ==
- Renault RS engine
- Peugeot F1 engine
- Mercedes-Benz FO engine
- Ferrari V10 engine
- Petronas F1 engine
- Cosworth CR engine
- Honda V10 engine
- Asiatech F1 engine
- Toyota RVX engine
- Cosworth TJ / CA engine
