= BMW Sauber F1.06 =

Formula One racing car

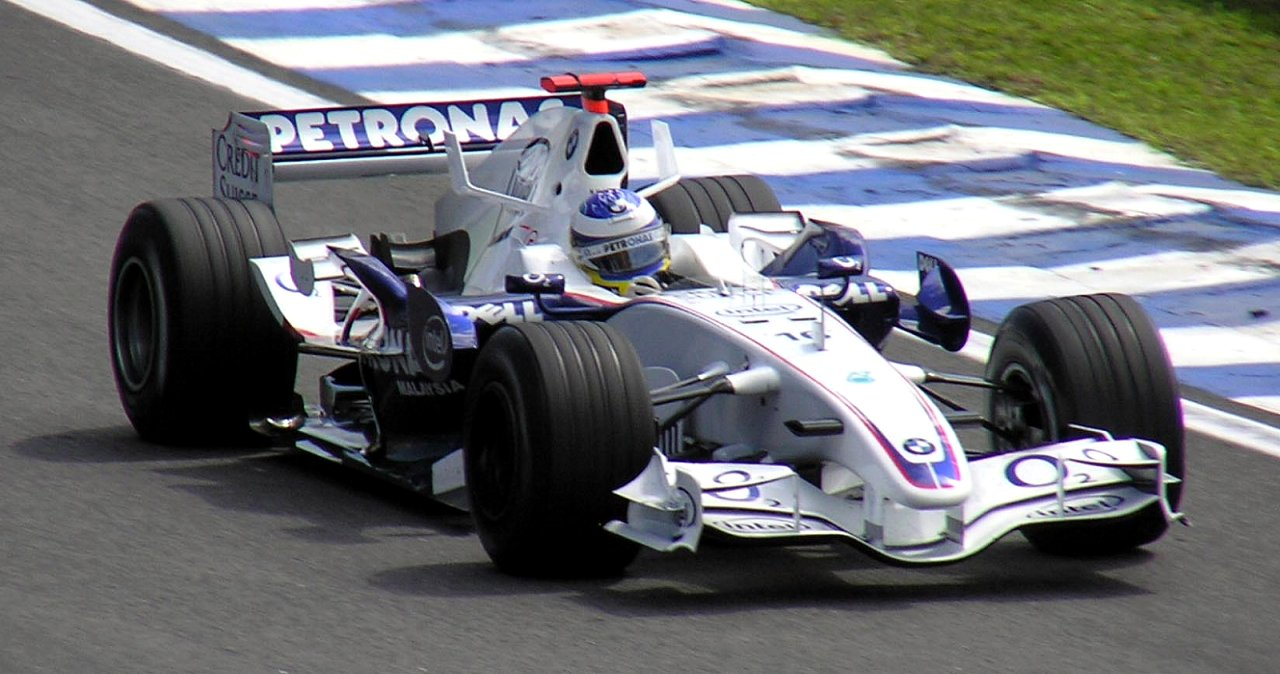
- Nick Heidfeld driving the F1.06 at the 2006 Brazilian Grand Prix
- Category: Formula One
- Constructor: BMW Sauber
- Designers: Willy Rampf (Technical Director); Jacky Eeckelaert (Engineering Director); Christoph Zimmermann (Head of Composite Design); Matt Cranor (Head of Mechanical Design); Ruedi Schorno (Head of Systems Engineering); Seamus Mullarkey (Head of Aerodynamics); Dirk de Beer (Principal Aerodynamicist); Heinz Paschen (Engine Director); Angelo Camerini (Chief Designer, Engine)
- Predecessor: Sauber C24
- Successor: BMW Sauber F1.07

Technical specifications
- Chassis: carbon-fibre monocoque
- Suspension (front): Upper and lower wishbones, inboard springs and dampers, actuated by pushrods
- Suspension (rear): As front
- Length: 4,610 mm (181 in)
- Width: 1,800 mm (71 in)
- Height: 1,000 mm (39 in)
- Axle track: Front: 1,470 mm (57.874 in); Rear: 1,410 mm (55.512 in)
- Wheelbase: 3,110 mm (122 in)
- Engine: BMW P86 2.4-litre V8
- Transmission: BMW Sauber 7-speed longitudinal
- Power: 760 hp @ 19,500 rpm
- Weight: 600 kg (1,300 lb) (Dry weight including driver)
- Fuel: Petronas
- Lubricants: Petronas Syntium lubrication
- Tyres: Michelin

Competition history
- Notable entrants: BMW Sauber F1 Team
- Notable drivers: 16. (Germany) Nick Heidfeld; 17. (Canada) Jacques Villeneuve; 17. (Poland) Robert Kubica
- Debut: 2006 Bahrain Grand Prix
- Last event: 2006 Brazilian Grand Prix
Races	Wins	Poles	F/Laps
18	0	0	0
- Constructors' Championships: 0
- Drivers' Championships: 0

The BMW Sauber F1.06 (originally known as the Sauber C25), also simply known as the BMW F1.06, was the car with which the BMW Sauber team competed in the 2006 Formula One World Championship. It was driven by German Nick Heidfeld, who joined from Williams, and Canadian Jacques Villeneuve, who had spent one season with Sauber before it was bought by BMW. However, Villeneuve was replaced by third driver, Pole Robert Kubica, before the season finished. The year marked the first time that BMW had competed as a full team; previously it had only supplied engines. The chassis was designed by Willy Rampf, Jacky Eeckelaert and Seamus Mullarkey with the powertrain being designed by Heinz Paschen.

This was the first V8-powered Hinwil-based Formula One car since the Sauber C14 in 1995 and also first Hinwil-based Formula One car to utilize other than Ferrari engines since the Ford Cosworth-powered Sauber C15 in the 1996 season.

== 2006 season ==
The 2006 season was treated as very much a transitional year by the team, so the car's level of competitiveness was a pleasant surprise. The F1.06 was a contender for points throughout the season, and its form culminated with two podium finishes: one for Heidfeld at the Hungaroring, and the other for Kubica at Monza. BMW Sauber also developed the car throughout the year, with some sort of improvement available at every race. The team's innovation even caused controversy: a "flexible" rear wing was stiffened early in the season and two vertical pylons in front of the cockpit were banned after an appearance at Magny-Cours. The team eventually finished fifth in the Constructors' Championship, with 36 points. The F1.06 car is the last BMW Sauber car to be developed by Sauber due to team transition.

== Sponsorship and livery ==
BMW Sauber went into the 2006 season with existing major sponsorship such as Credit Suisse and Petronas. They received a new sponsorship such as Intel and O2, a computer hardware company, Dell was started at European Grand Prix. The team's new livery, which was maintained throughout its tenure in Formula One, consisted of the traditional BMW blue and white with a hint of red. The front nose livery was also similar to BMW Williams 2001–2005 livery but the grey was replaced by red.

During the practice session at the British Grand Prix, Villeneuve's rear wing read "Just Married". At the Brazilian Grand Prix, both cars had a rear wing that read "Danke Michael"/"Thanks Michael" during the practice and qualifying sessions, in response to Michael Schumacher's impending retirement.

== Gallery ==
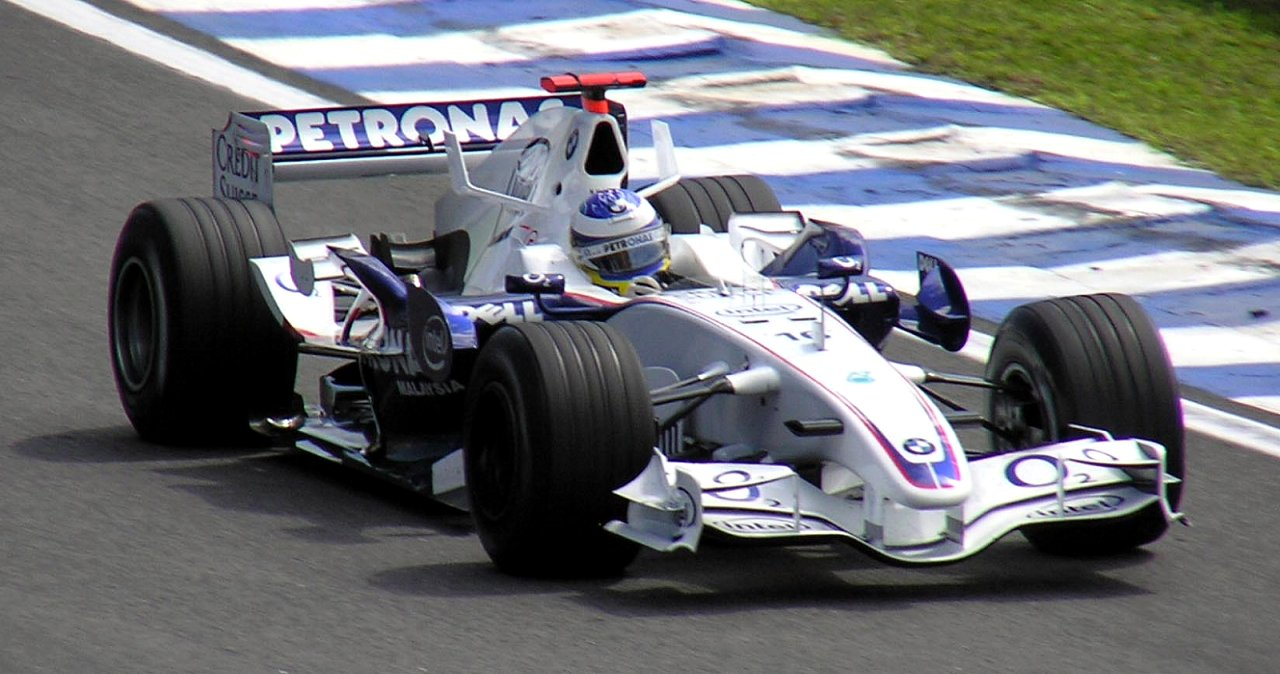
Nick Heidfeld at the 2006 Brazilian Grand Prix.

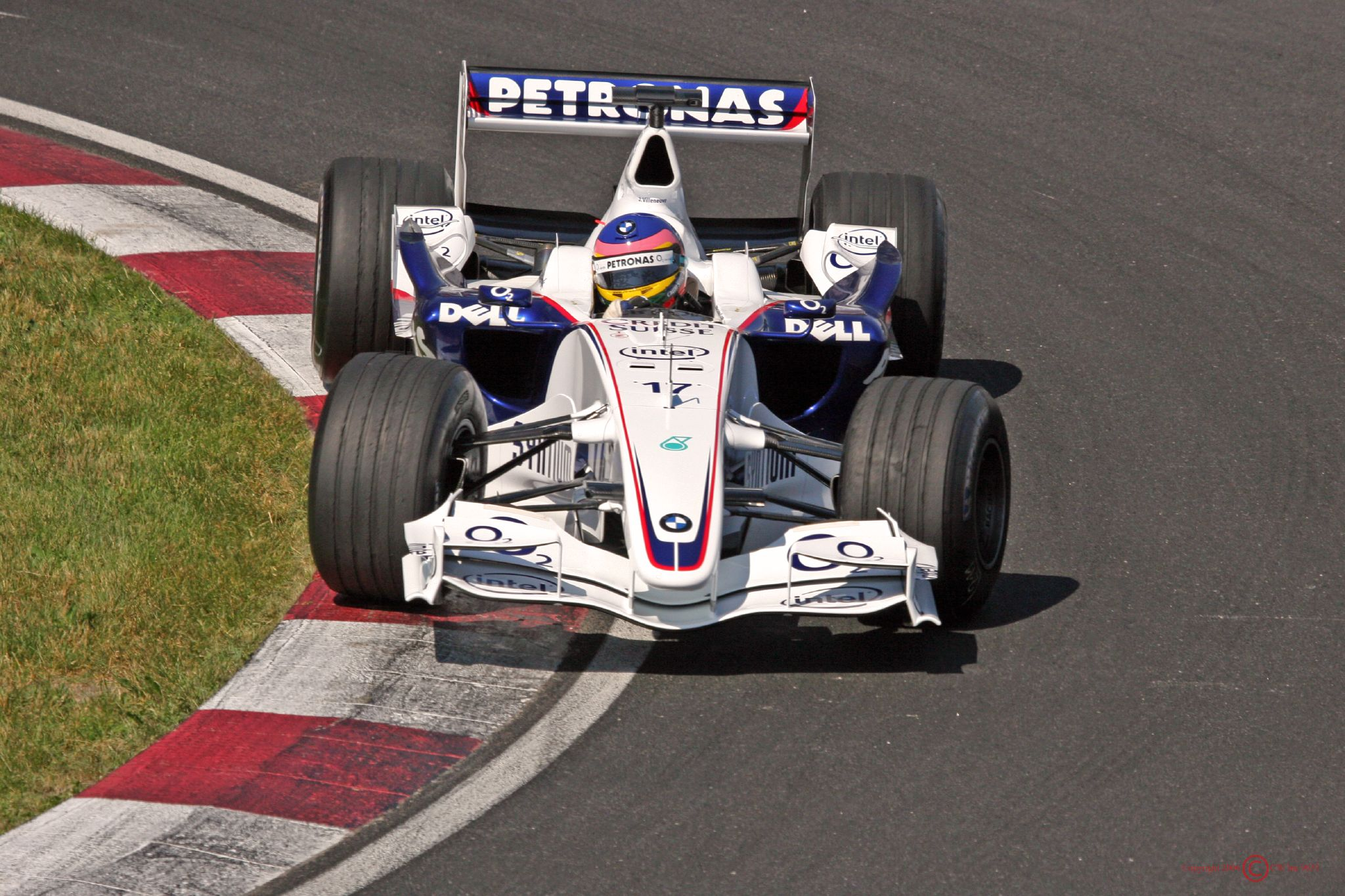
Jacques Villeneuve at the 2006 Canadian Grand Prix.

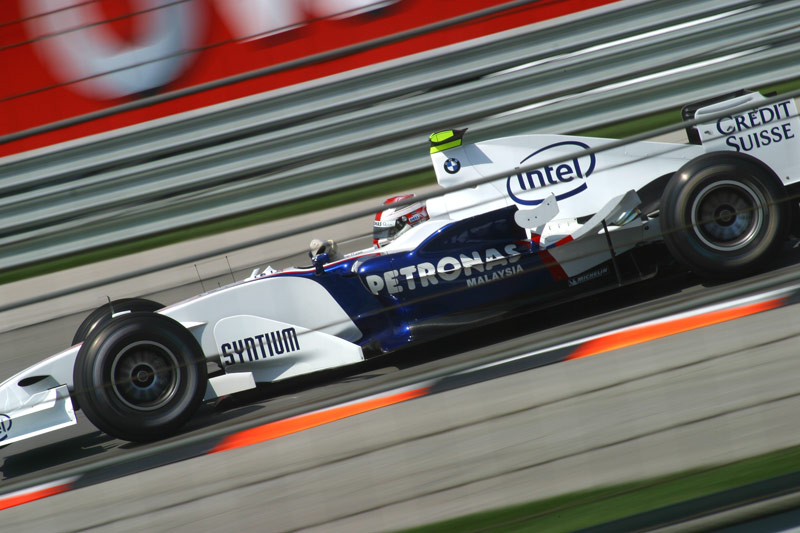
Robert Kubica at the 2006 United States Grand Prix.

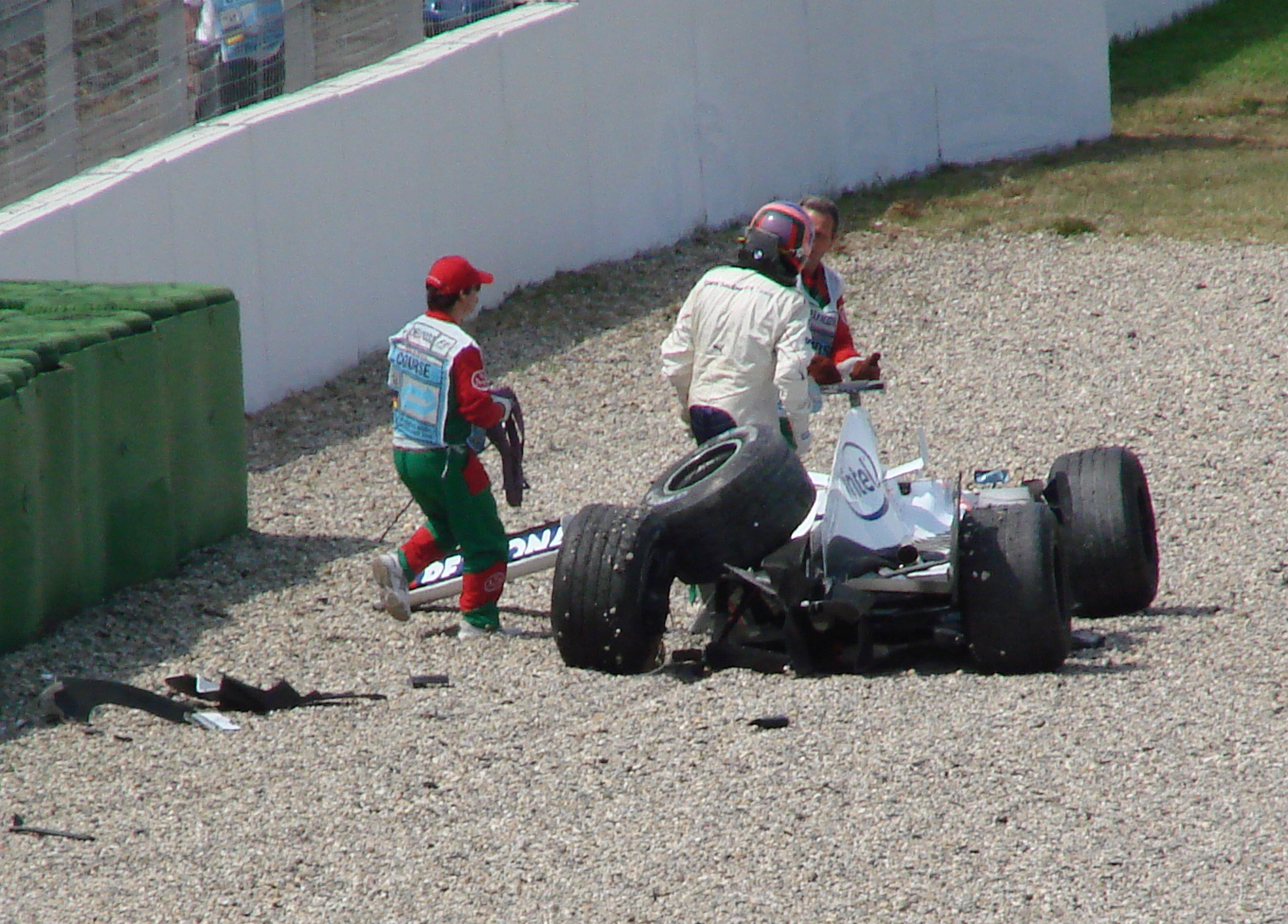
Villeneuve walks away from his crashed F1.06 at the 2006 German Grand Prix, his last F1 race.

== Complete Formula One results ==
(key) (results in bold indicate pole position)

Year	Team	Engine	Tyres	Drivers	1	2	3	4	5	6	7	8	9	10	11	12	13	14	15	16	17	18	Points	WCC
2006	BMW Sauber F1 Team	BMW V8	**MI**		BHR	MAL	AUS	SMR	EUR	ESP	MON	GBR	CAN	USA	FRA	GER	HUN	TUR	ITA	CHN	JPN	BRA	36	5th
2006	BMW Sauber F1 Team	BMW V8	**MI**	(Germany) Nick Heidfeld	12	Ret	4	13	10	8	7	7	7	Ret	8	Ret	3	14	8	7	8	17^{†}	36	5th
2006	BMW Sauber F1 Team	BMW V8	**MI**	(Canada) Jacques Villeneuve	Ret	7	6	12	8	12	14	8	Ret	Ret	11	Ret							36	5th
2006	BMW Sauber F1 Team	BMW V8	**MI**	(Poland) Robert Kubica	TD	TD	TD	TD	TD	TD	TD	TD	TD	TD	TD	TD	DSQ	12	3	13	9	9	36	5th
