= Sauber C24 =

Formula One racing car

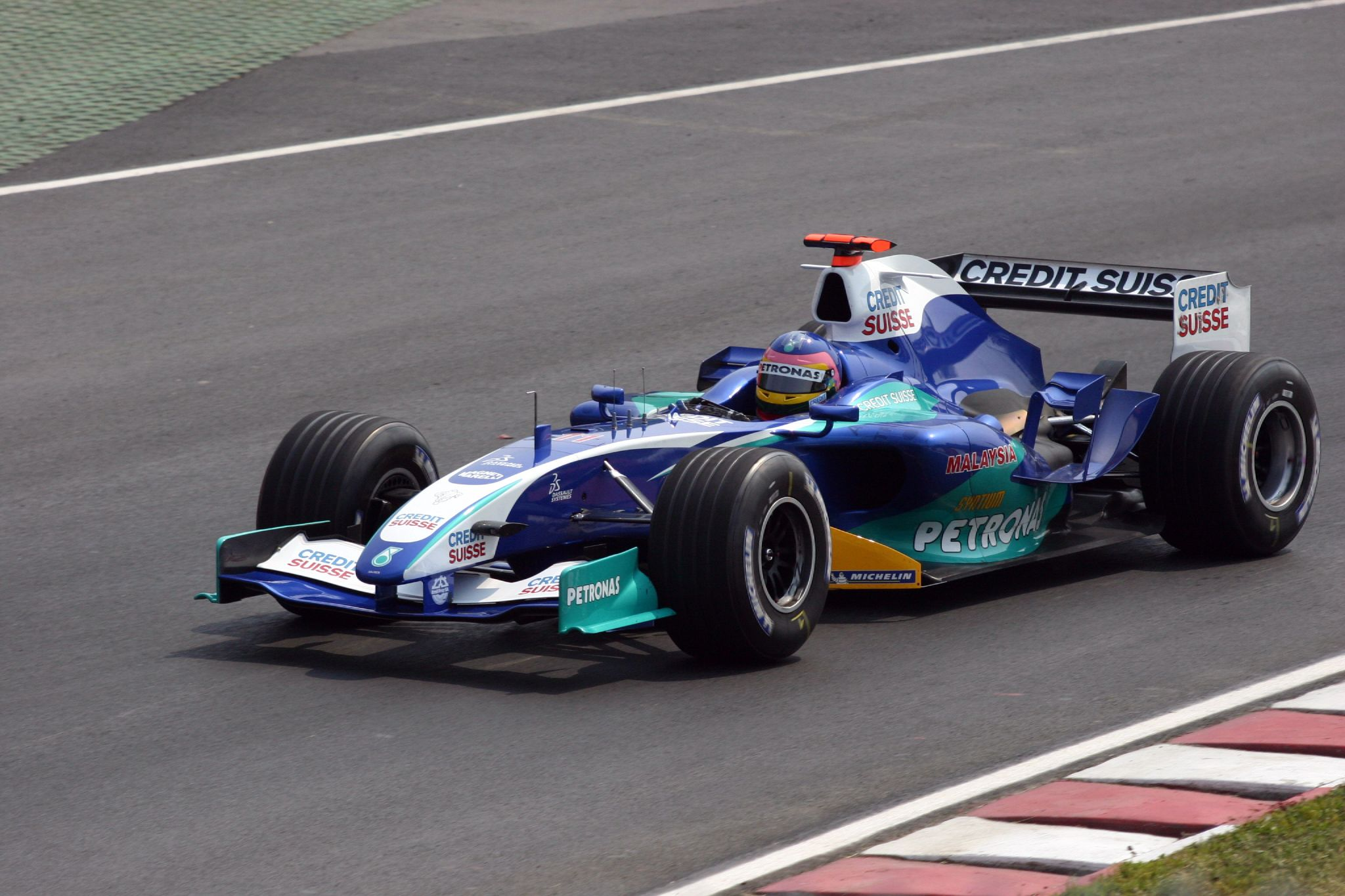
- Jacques Villeneuve driving the Sauber C24 at the 2005 Canadian Grand Prix.
- Category: Formula One
- Constructor: Sauber
- Designers: Willy Rampf (Technical Director); Osamu Goto (Engine Director); Jacky Eeckelaert (Engineering Director); Christoph Zimmermann (Head of Composite Design); Matt Cranor (Head of Mechanical Design); Ruedi Schorno (Head of Systems Engineering); Seamus Mullarkey (Head of Aerodynamics); Dirk de Beer (Principal Aerodynamicist)
- Predecessor: Sauber C23
- Successor: BMW Sauber F1.06

Technical specifications
- Chassis: Carbon fibre monocoque
- Suspension (front): Upper and lower wishbones, inboard springs and dampers, actuated by pushrods
- Suspension (rear): As front
- Engine: Petronas 05A (Ferrari Tipo 055) 3.0 90° V10 naturally aspirated mid-engined, longitudinally mounted
- Transmission: Sauber 7-speed Semi automatic
- Fuel: Petronas
- Tyres: Michelin

Competition history
- Notable entrants: Sauber Petronas
- Notable drivers: 11. (Canada) Jacques Villeneuve; 12. (Brazil) Felipe Massa
- Debut: 2005 Australian Grand Prix
- Last event: 2005 Chinese Grand Prix
Races	Wins	Poles	F/Laps
19	0	0	0
- Constructors' Championships: 0
- Drivers' Championships: 0

The Sauber C24 was the car with which the Sauber team competed in the 2005 Formula One World Championship.

The C24 was driven by Jacques Villeneuve and Felipe Massa, the first time Sauber had a non-European driver lineup. The team did not have a test driver. Sauber finished eighth in the Constructors' Championship scoring just 20 points - the team's lowest finish since 2000 season largely due to the team struggling to adapt with Michelin tyres due to the C24 chassis initially being designed around Bridgestone tyres.

== Overview ==
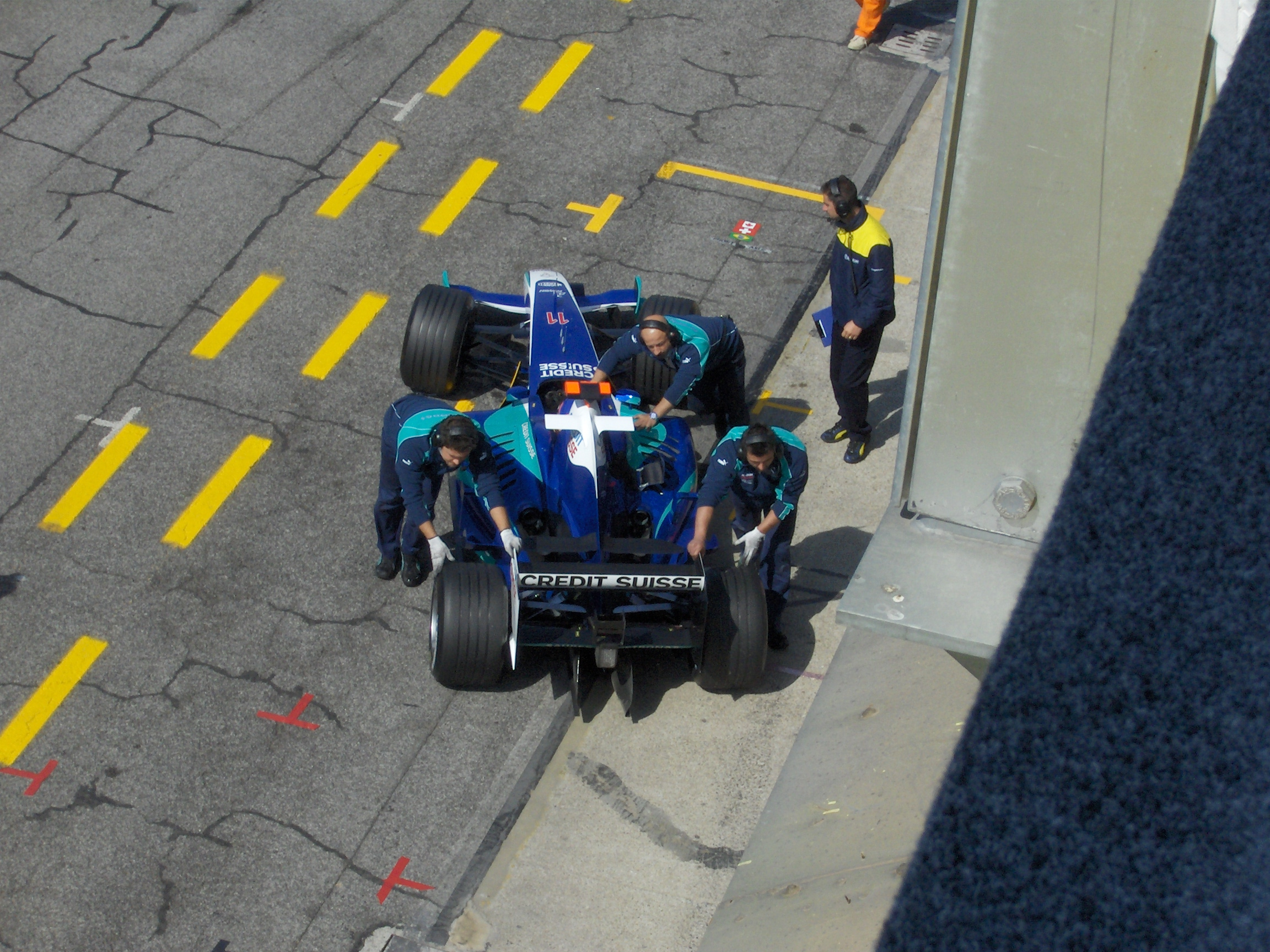
Jacques Villeneuve in the pits at the 2005 San Marino Grand Prix.

The Sauber C24 was supposed to be launched in Kuala Lumpur, Malaysia on 11 January to mark the 10th anniversary of Petronas, but the launch was cancelled due to the Asian tsunami disaster in 2004. This car was the first completely designed with the team's new wind tunnel at Hinwil. The engine was a Petronas 05A 3.0 V10.

== Sponsorship and livery ==
Sauber went into 2005 season with sponsorship continuity. The livery had a sponsorship change with Red Bull sponsorship departing to Red Bull Racing after a nine-year alliance with Sauber. The front nose livery was changed to blue due to usage of Michelin Tires, previously the nose livery was white in 2001-2004 seasons. The team's main sponsor was Credit Suisse.

At the Malaysian Grand Prix, both cars sported a Malaysian flag on the engine cover.

== Sauber C24B ==
The Sauber team was taken over by BMW for the 2006 season. A C24B variant of the car fitted with BMW's P86 V8 Formula One engine was used in early testing between the 2005 and 2006 seasons in the hands of Nick Heidfeld and Jacques Villeneuve. On 27 November 2005, Heidfeld attended a Sauber seat fitting with his former boss Peter Sauber. On 28 November-2 December 2005, Heidfeld attended off-season testing at Barcelona in a C24B car using Michelin tyres. On 7–17 December 2005, Heidfeld and Villeneuve attended off season testing at Circuito de Jerez with the same car. Just before the launch of BMW Sauber F1.06, Heidfeld attended off-season testing with C24B car in a full white interim livery on 10–13 January 2006.

== Complete Formula One results ==
(key)

Year	Entrant	Engine	Tyres	Drivers	1	2	3	4	5	6	7	8	9	10	11	12	13	14	15	16	17	18	19	Points	WCC
2005	Sauber Petronas	Petronas V10*	MI		AUS	MAL	BHR	SMR	ESP	MON	EUR	CAN	USA	FRA	GBR	GER	HUN	TUR	ITA	BEL	BRA	JPN	CHN	20	8th
2005	Sauber Petronas	Petronas V10*	MI	(Canada) Jacques Villeneuve	13	Ret	11^{†}	4	Ret	11	13	9	DNS	8	14	15	Ret	11	11	6	12	12	10	20	8th
2005	Sauber Petronas	Petronas V10*	MI	(Brazil) Felipe Massa	10	10	7	10	11^{†}	9	14	4	DNS	Ret	10	8	14	Ret	9	10	11	10	6	20	8th

* denotes Ferrari engine badged as Petronas
