= Williams FW22 =

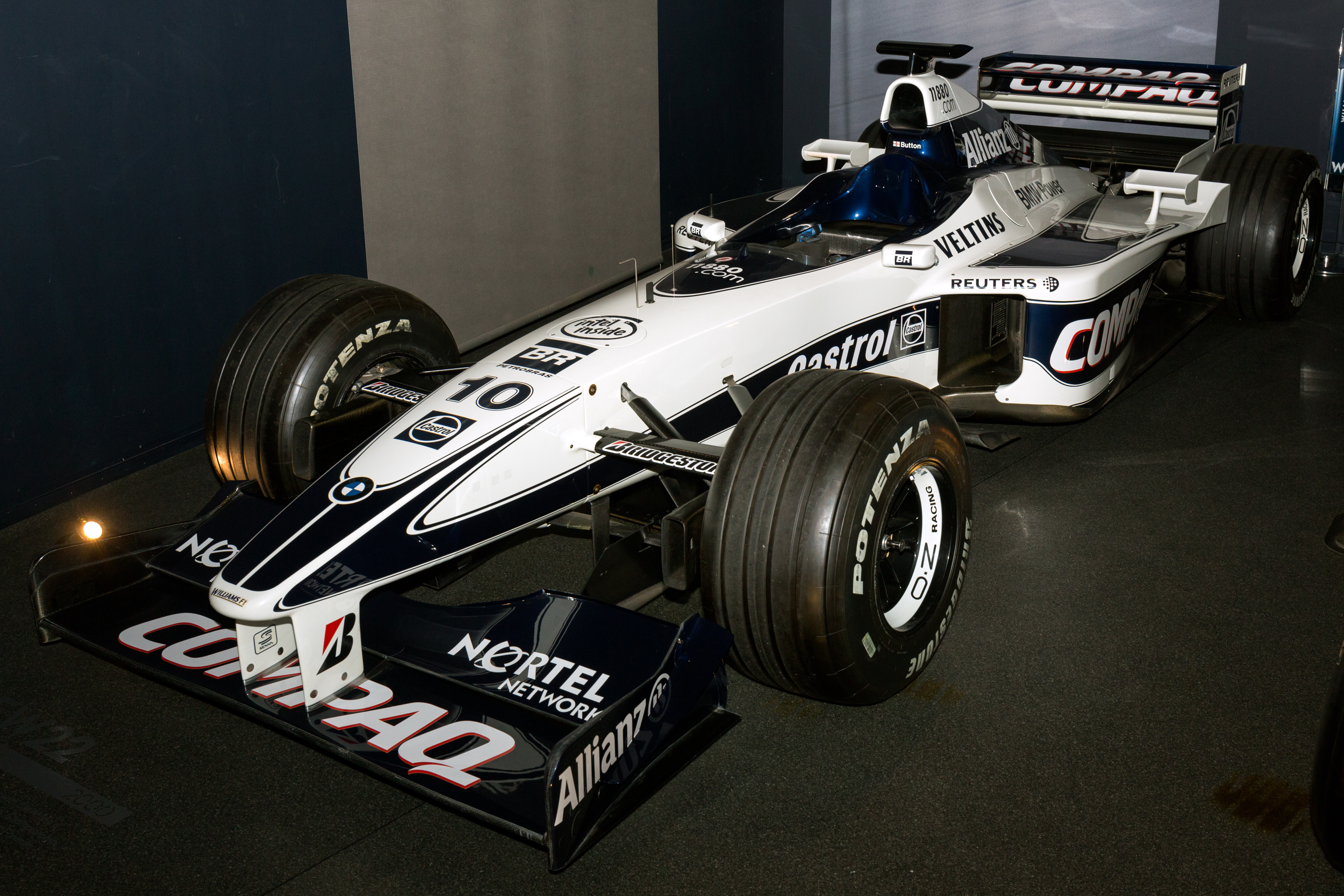
- Jenson Button's FW22 on display at the Williams Conference Centre
- Category: Formula One
- Constructor: Williams
- Designers: Patrick Head (Technical Director); Gavin Fisher (Chief Designer); Brian O'Roake (Chief Composites Engineer); Mark Tatham (Chief Mechanical Engineer); Geoff Willis (Head of Aerodynamics); Jason Somerville (Senior Aerodynamicist); Paul Rosche (Chief Engine Designer - BMW); Werner Laurenz (Technical Engine Director - BMW)
- Predecessor: Williams FW21
- Successor: Williams FW23

Technical specifications
- Chassis: Carbon-fibre monocoque
- Suspension (front): Williams double wishbone, torsion bar, pushrod
- Suspension (rear): Williams double wishbone, coil spring, pushrod
- Engine: BMW E41/4 2,998 cc (182.9 cu in) V10 (72°) naturally aspirated mid-engined
- Transmission: Williams 7-speed longitudinal semi-automatic sequential
- Power: 810 hp (604 kW) @ 17,500 RPM
- Fuel: Petrobras
- Lubricants: Castrol
- Tyres: Bridgestone

Competition history
- Notable entrants: BMW Williams F1 Team
- Notable drivers: 9. (Germany) Ralf Schumacher; 10. (United Kingdom) Jenson Button
- Debut: 2000 Australian Grand Prix
- Last event: 2000 Malaysian Grand Prix
Races	Wins	Podiums	Poles	F/Laps
17	0	3	0	0
- Constructors' Championships: 0
- Drivers' Championships: 0

The Williams FW22 was the car with which the Williams team competed in the 2000 Formula One World Championship. The car was driven by German Ralf Schumacher in his second season with the team and British rookie Jenson Button who replaced Alessandro Zanardi in the team who was dropped after just one season with the Grove outfit.

This was the first Formula One car powered by a BMW engine since the Megatron-badged Arrows A10B in 1988.

== Design ==
An evolution of the previous season's FW21, it marked the first year of the team's collaboration with BMW as an engine supplier, a partnership that would last until the end of 2005; this was also the first Formula One car since 1987 to use fully factory supported BMW engines.

== Racing history ==
The FW22 proved to be extremely promising in the hands of young German driver Ralf Schumacher and English debutant Jenson Button. Schumacher achieved eight points finishes (including three third places) and Button six; at the Brazilian Grand Prix, the Englishman became the youngest driver at that time to score a World Championship point, aged 20 years and two months. Schumacher finished fifth in the Drivers' Championship with 24 points while Button finished eighth with 12; the combined 36 points placed Williams third in the Constructors' Championship, behind the dominant Ferrari and McLaren teams.

== Sponsorship and livery ==
Williams had a new livery inspired by the BMW-powered Brabhams of the 1980s. They went into the 2000 season with several renewed sponsors like Nortel Networks, Castrol and Petrobras. The team received new sponsorships such as Allianz, Reuters, Compaq and Intel Inside while Brother, Komatsu and Auto Motor und Sport were discontinued.

As Williams did not have any tobacco sponsorships, Veltins once again returned with the team for the third year. In French, the logo was replaced with "Veltins Alkoholfrei" but it was removed in scale models and video games.

== Complete Formula One results ==
(key) (results in bold indicate pole position)

Year	Team	Engine	Tyres	Drivers	1	2	3	4	5	6	7	8	9	10	11	12	13	14	15	16	17	Points	WCC
2000	Williams	BMW E41/4 V10	**B**		AUS	BRA	SMR	GBR	ESP	EUR	MON	CAN	FRA	AUT	GER	HUN	BEL	ITA	USA	JPN	MAL	**36**	**3rd**
2000	Williams	BMW E41/4 V10	**B**	(Germany) Ralf Schumacher	3	5	Ret	4	4	Ret	Ret	14	5	Ret	7	5	3	3	Ret	Ret	Ret	**36**	**3rd**
2000	Williams	BMW E41/4 V10	**B**	(United Kingdom) Jenson Button	Ret	6	Ret	5	17	10	Ret	11	8	5	4	9	5	Ret	Ret	5	Ret	**36**	**3rd**

== Sponsors ==
Brand	Country	Placed on
Compaq	United States	Rear wing, sidepods, front wing
Castrol	United Kingdom	Rear wing end plate, nose, nosecone
Veltins	Germany	Side
Nortel	Canada	Front wing
Petrobras	Brazil	Nose, mirrors
11880.com	Germany	Fin, nose
Intel	United States	Nose
Reuters	United Kingdom	Sidepods, rear wing end plate
Allianz	Germany	Front wing end plate, fin
BMW	Germany	Nosecone, fin
