= BMW Sauber F1.07 =

Formula One racing car

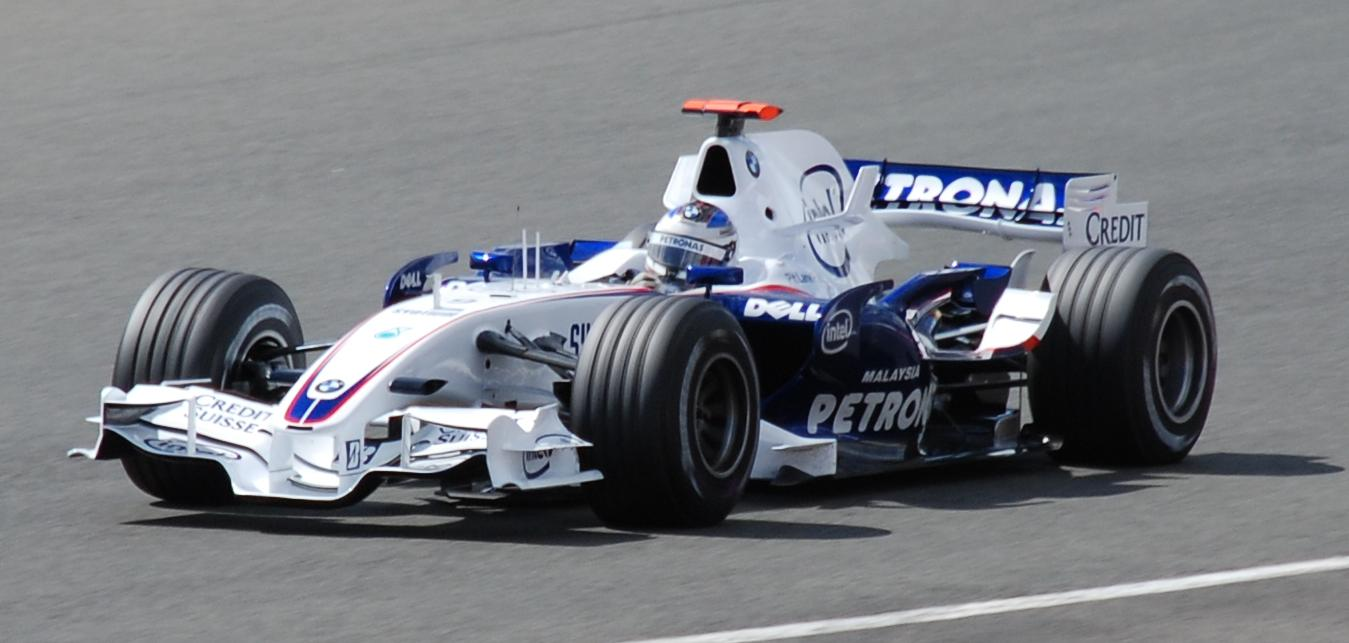
- Nick Heidfeld driving the F1.07 at the 2007 British Grand Prix
- Category: Formula One
- Constructor: BMW Sauber
- Designers: Willy Rampf (Technical Director); Walter Riedl (Engineering Director); Jörg Zander (Chief Designer); Thomas Knodel (Deputy Chief Designer); Jochen Schröder (Head of Electronics); Loïc Serra (Chief Vehicle Dynamicist); Willem Toet (Head of Aerodynamics); Seamus Mullarkey (Chief Aerodynamicist); Heinz Paschen (Engine Director); Angelo Camerini (Chief Designer, Engine)
- Predecessor: BMW Sauber F1.06
- Successor: BMW Sauber F1.08

Technical specifications
- Chassis: Carbon-fibre and honeycomb composite monocoque
- Suspension (front): Double wishbone, push-rod activated inboard spring/damper. Zero keel geometry
- Suspension (rear): Double wishbone, push-rod activated inboard spring/damper
- Length: 4,580 mm (180 in)
- Width: 1,800 mm (71 in)
- Height: 1,000 mm (39 in)
- Axle track: F: 1,470 mm (58 in); R: 1,410 mm (56 in)
- Wheelbase: 3,110 mm (122 in)
- Engine: BMW P86/7 2.4 L (146 cu in) 90° V8 naturally aspirated, mid-engine, longitudinally mounted
- Transmission: BMW Sauber 7-speed "Quick Shift Gearbox (QSG)". Cast titanium housing, steel gears.
- Battery: Magneti Marelli lead acid 13 volts
- Power: 750 hp (559 kW)
- Weight: 605 kg (1,334 lb)
- Fuel: Petronas Primax
- Lubricants: Petronas Syntium
- Brakes: Brembo carbon brake discs with 6-piston calipers and Carbone Industrie pads
- Tyres: Bridgestone

Competition history
- Notable entrants: BMW Sauber F1 Team
- Notable drivers: 9. (Germany) Nick Heidfeld; 10. (Poland) Robert Kubica; 10. (Germany) Sebastian Vettel
- Debut: 2007 Australian Grand Prix
- Last event: 2007 Brazilian Grand Prix
Races	Wins	Poles	F/Laps
17	0	0	0
- Constructors' Championships: 0 (2nd: 2007)

The BMW Sauber F1.07 is a Formula One single-seater racing car built by BMW Sauber for the 2007 Formula One World Championship. The chassis was designed by Willy Rampf, Walter Reidl, Jörg Zander and Willem Toet with the powertrain being designed by Heinz Paschen. The car was the first to have been designed fully by BMW, following their purchase of the former Sauber team. Initial pre-season testing was very positive, with many speculating that BMW could surprise some of the top teams with their performances when the season got underway.

== Design ==
=== Aerodynamics ===
The rear wing is mounted by the endplates, rather than the pylon-mounted arrangement used by some rivals' cars (such as the McLaren MP4-22).

=== Engine and transmission ===
The engine's name, P86/7, is indicative of the fact that it is not a new engine, since it is heavily based on the P86 used in the 2006 F1.06 car. This is a requirement of the homologation rules introduced by the FIA. The BMW Sauber team adopted a seamless shift sequential transmission mechanism, known as QuickShift, for its gearbox.

== Season performance ==
The car was a significant step up from 2006's F1.06, scoring 2 podium positions in a season in which 46 of the possible 51 podium positions were occupied by Scuderia Ferrari and McLaren in a dominant season. Both of these were by Nick Heidfeld — a 2nd at the 2007 Canadian Grand Prix and 3rd at the 2007 Hungarian Grand Prix. However, they scored points on 26 out of the possible 34 occasions. They scored points with at least one car in every single race, and points with both cars six races in a row between the French and Italian Grands Prix. Robert Kubica had 4th places in Spain, France and Britain, which were his best results. Sebastian Vettel scored points for 8th place in his only appearance for the team, the United States Grand Prix.

Heidfeld was the only driver to frequently break the Ferrari/McLaren deadlock at the front of qualifying, with his best result being 2nd on the grid in Hungary. The BMW Sauber cars qualified in the top 10 every race apart from Kubica qualifying 14th in Belgium.

The car was also involved in one of the biggest crashes of the modern era, Kubica's in Canada. He was replaced by future world champion Vettel for one race.

== Livery ==
BMW Sauber went into 2007 season with sponsorship continuity; unlike many rival teams such as Honda, McLaren and Renault, who had to drop their tobacco sponsorship. This meant the 2007 cars had a similar livery to that of the 2006 design with only subtle changes.

== Gallery ==
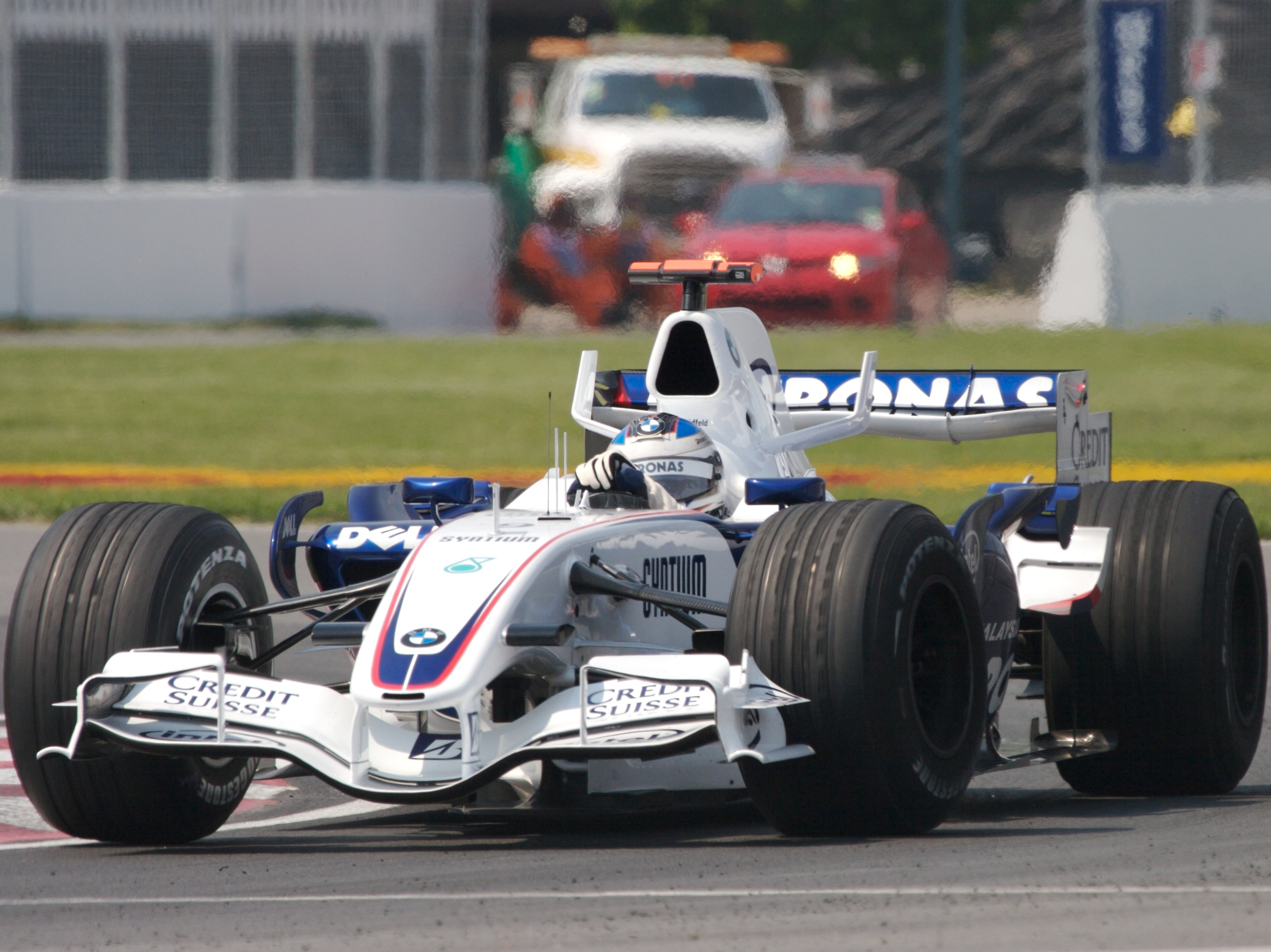
Nick Heidfeld driving the F1.07 at the 2007 Canadian Grand Prix.

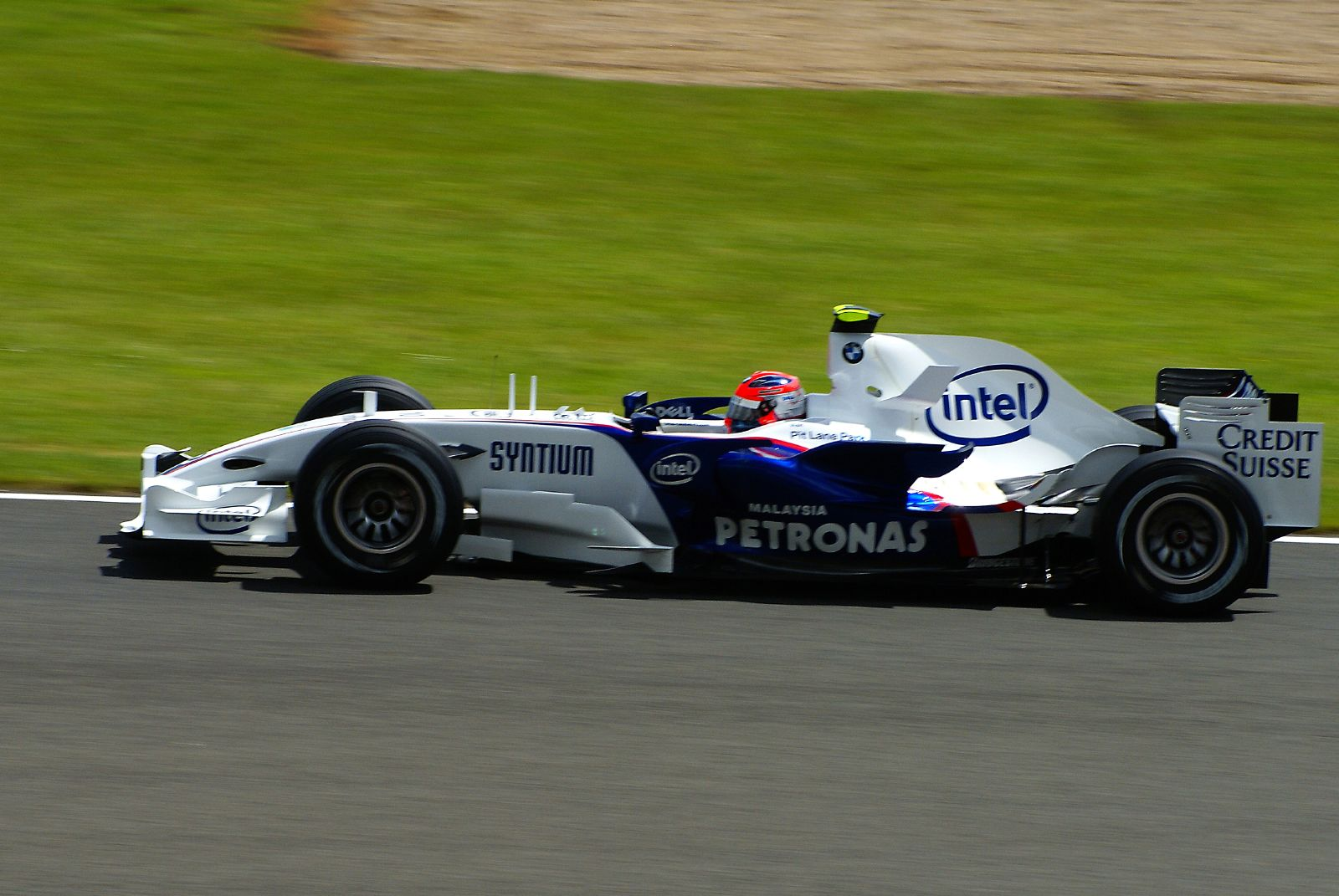
Robert Kubica driving the F1.07 at the 2007 British Grand Prix.

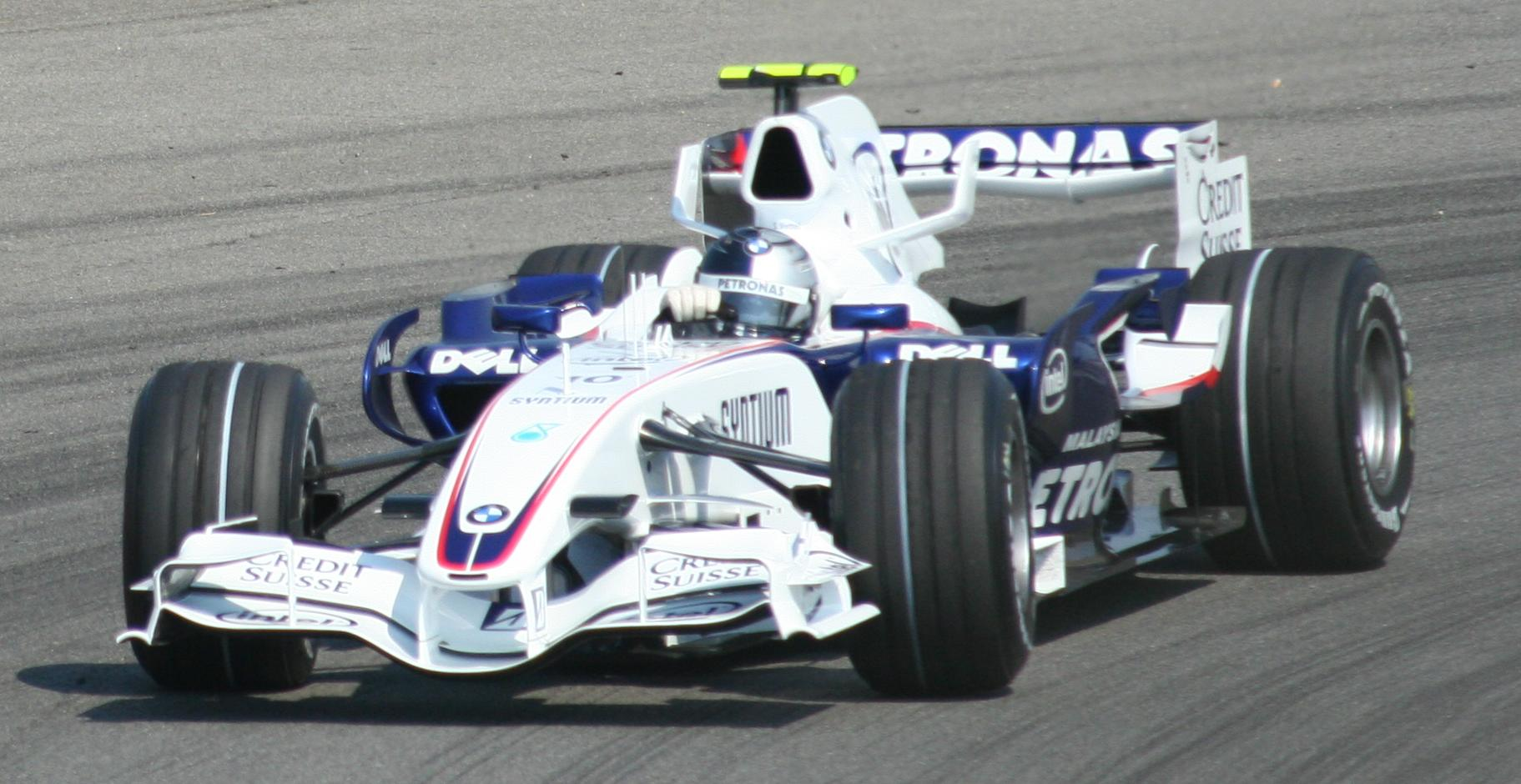
Sebastian Vettel driving the F1.07 at the 2007 United States Grand Prix.

== Complete Formula One results ==
(key) (results in bold indicate pole position)

Year	Team	Engine	Tyres	Drivers	1	2	3	4	5	6	7	8	9	10	11	12	13	14	15	16	17	Points	WCC
2007	BMW Sauber F1 Team	BMW V8	**B**		AUS	MAL	BHR	ESP	MON	CAN	USA	FRA	GBR	EUR	HUN	TUR	ITA	BEL	JPN	CHN	BRA	**101**	**2nd**
2007	BMW Sauber F1 Team	BMW V8	**B**	(Germany) Nick Heidfeld	4	4	4	Ret	6	2	Ret	5	6	6	3	4	4	5	14^{†}	7	6	**101**	**2nd**
2007	BMW Sauber F1 Team	BMW V8	**B**	(Poland) Robert Kubica	Ret	18	6	4	5	Ret		4	4	7	5	8	5	9	7	Ret	5	**101**	**2nd**
2007	BMW Sauber F1 Team	BMW V8	**B**	(Germany) Sebastian Vettel	TD	TD					8											**101**	**2nd**
