= Veltins Brewery =

Brewery in Meschede-Grevenstein, in North Rhine-Westphalia, Germany

Brauerei C & A Veltins

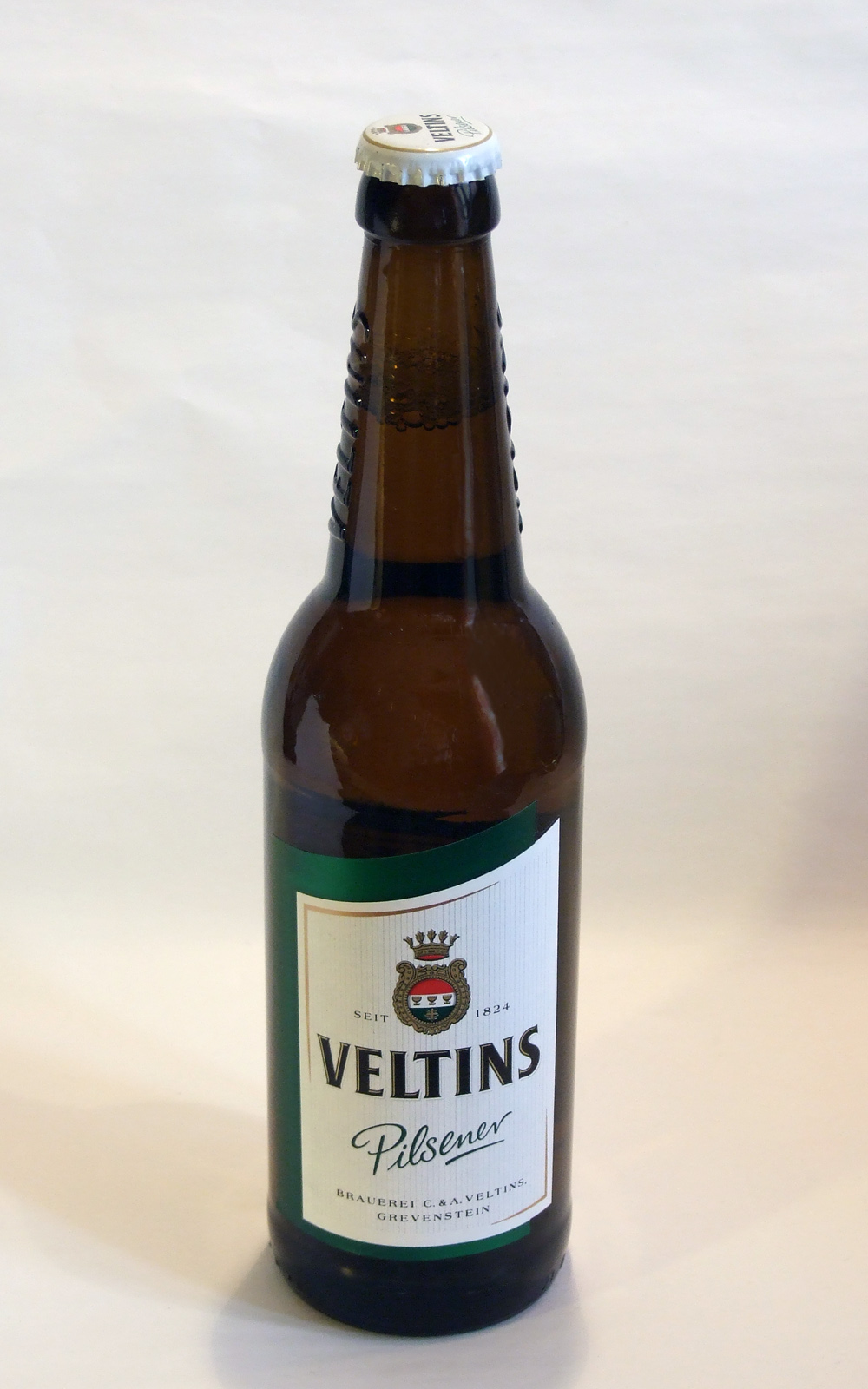
- Veltins pilsner
- Type: GmbH & Co. KG
- Location: Meschede-Grevenstein, Germany
- Coordinates: 51°18′20″N 8°7′30″E
- Opened: 1824
- Annual production volume: 3.05 million hl (2.60 million US bbl) in 2019
- Employees: 616 (2015)
- Website: www.veltins.de

Brauerei C & A Veltins (German pronunciation: [ˈfɛltɪns]) is a brewery in the west German city of Meschede-Grevenstein. In 2015, Veltins ranked fourth among Germany's best selling beers.

== History ==
The small guesthouse brewery of Franz Kramer opened its simple wooden gates in 1824. Clemens Veltins took over the brewery in 1852. The new name, Brauerei C & A Veltins, came from the twins Carl and Anton Veltins who took over the company from their father in 1893. Veltins brewery produces the well known Veltins Pilsener beer. Susanne Veltins has directed the company since 1994.

Veltins owns the naming rights to the football stadium Veltins-Arena of German Bundesliga club FC Schalke 04 in Gelsenkirchen. It is one of the most modern stadiums in Europe. The stadium hosted the 2004 UEFA Champions League Final, five matches at the 2006 FIFA World Cup and four matches at UEFA EURO 2024. The Kriesel curve at the Winterberg bobsleigh, luge, and skeleton track is named after the brewery.

== See also ==
- List of brewing companies in Germany
