= Krisel =

Krisel may refer to:

- Jonathan Krisel, an American director, producer, and writer
- William Krisel, an American architect, especially known for mid-century modern designs

== See also ==
- Mark Crysell, a New Zealand television presenter and journalist
- Kreisel, a type of turn on some sledding tracks
- Kreisel (surname)
