= Mecklenburg State Theatre =

Coordinates: 53°37′37″N 11°25′02″E

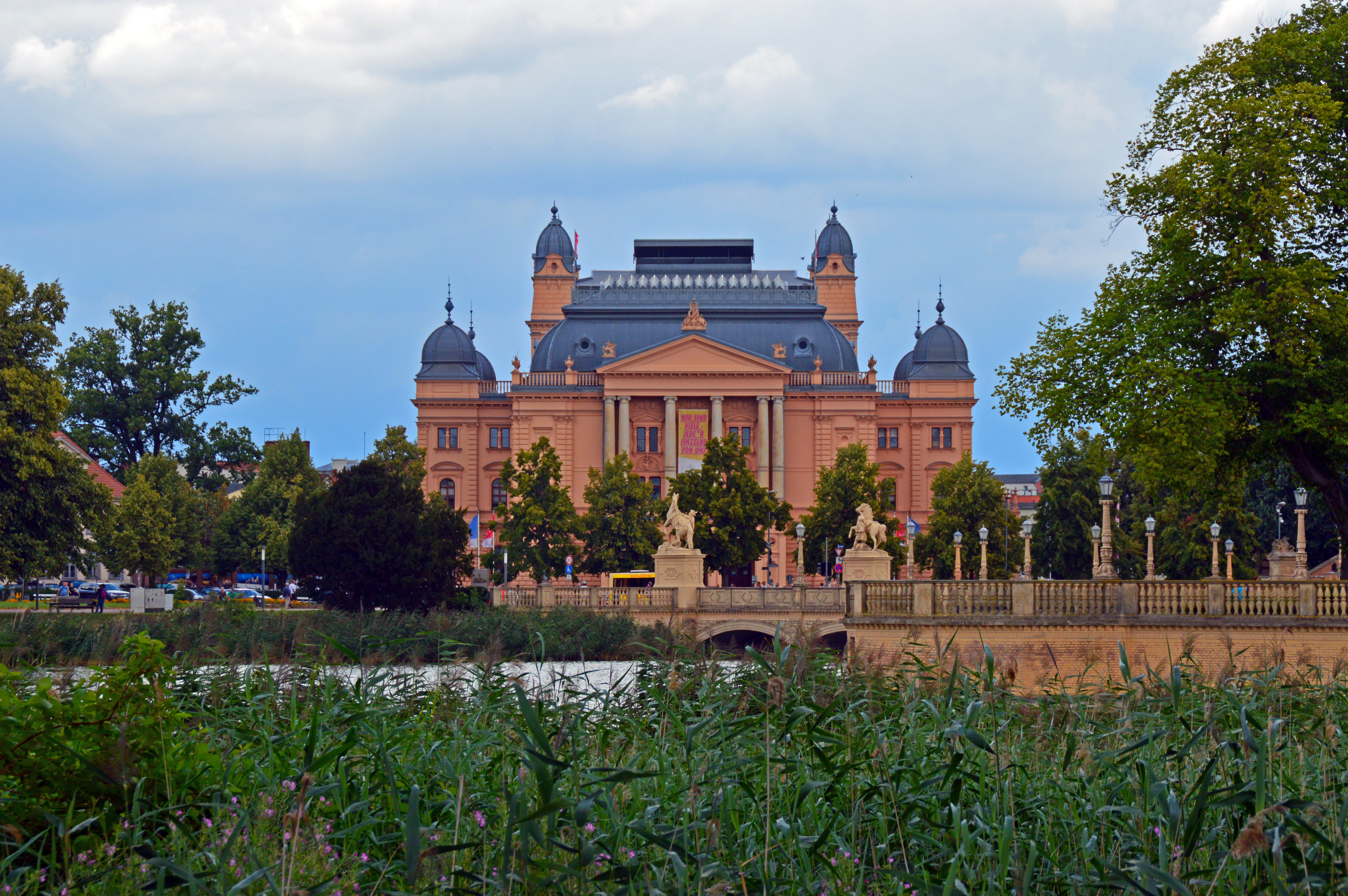
Mecklenburg State Theatre

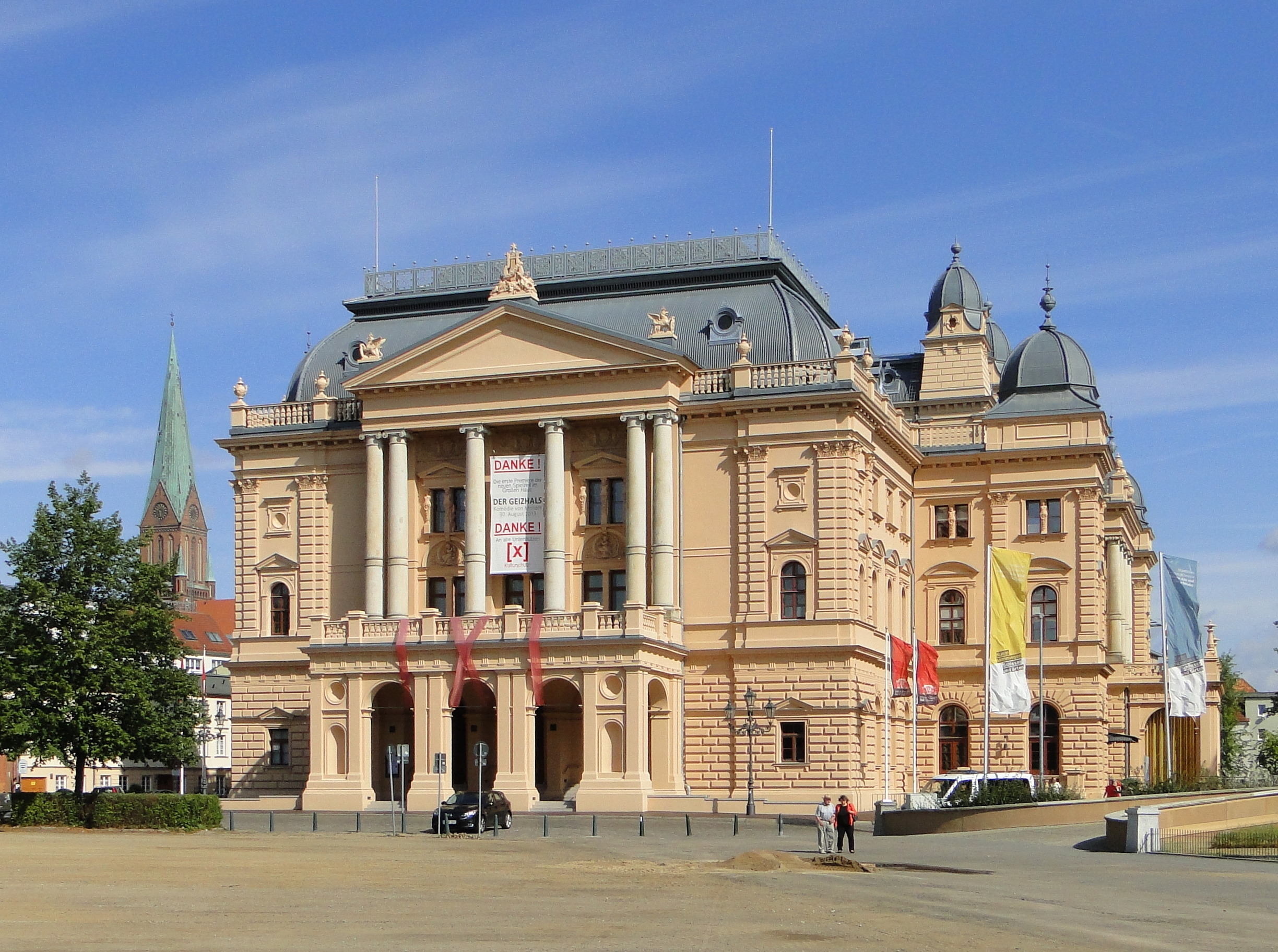
Mecklenburg State Theatre in Schwerin (facade of the main theatre of Mecklenburgisches Staatstheater)

The Mecklenburg State Theatre (German: Mecklenburgisches Staatstheater Schwerin) is the principal theatre of Schwerin in Germany. Its main theatre (or Großes Haus) seats 650 people and is used for the performance of plays, opera, musical theatre and ballet. Designed by Georg Daniel, the present building was built between 1883 and 1886 after the previous court theatre had been destroyed by fire in 1882. It was inaugurated on 3 October 1886 with a performance of Gluck's Iphigénie en Aulide with Marie Wittich in the title role. The complex also includes the State Museum in Schwerin (Staatliche Museum Schwerin) and a 240-seat concert hall, now used for performances of chamber works.

All theatres were closed for the autumn season of 1944, with the staff drafted wherever possible. By German standards, wartime casualties and destruction by bombing in Schwerin were small, in spite of nightly RAF raids and the droning of massive bomber pulks as silver specks on the sky during the day on their way to Berlin. Americans were the first to enter the town in the spring of 1945, handing it over to the British until the Russians arrived. These ordered the immediate reopening of the theatre, taking great interest in light operas and operettas as an art they very much appreciated, but until then out of their reach in most parts of Stalin's Soviet Union. Not familiar with Central European culture, one saw their well-fed ladies wearing night gowns during the invariably full houses as a substitute for an evening dress. In the immediate years to follow, there was a gradual exodus of key staff to the West, where few found equivalent employment. The ensuing vacancies provided new chances for many musicians, who were prepared to stay in East Germany to gain important positions there in their later career.

Lutz Kreisel was the chief stage designer of the Mecklenburg State Theatre from 1971-2007.
