= Uwe Kreisel =

German linguistics author (born 1961)

Uwe Kreisel (born 1961) is a German writer and textbook author in the fields of linguistics, ESL, and cross-cultural topics.

== Bibliography ==
- 1992: English One. ISBN 3-499-19320-5
- 1993: English Two. ISBN 3-499-19321-3
- 1996: Net Jargon. ISBN 3-499-19854-1
- 1997: E-mail English. ISBN 3-499-19876-2
- 1997: Ultimate Idioms. ISBN 3-499-19586-0
- 2000: Fluessiges Englisch. ISBN 3-499-61183-X
  - 8th edition published 2009.
- 2002: American Slang in letzter Minute. ISBN 3-499-19623-9
- 2003: Kulturschluessel USA. ISBN 3-19-006000-2
- 2003: MultiLingua Classics: English One & Two, 2 CD-ROMs. ISBN 3-8032-5300-4
  - updated edition, 1st edition published 1995
- 2004: Viimase minuti ameerika släng. ISBN 9985-76-806-X
  - Estonian version of American Slang
- 2004: Kulturschluessel China. ISBN 3-19-005366-9
- 2007: China erleben und verstehen. ISBN 978-3-19-006001-6
- 2009: Smarte Sprüche: USA. ISBN 3-86647-397-4
- 2011: Englisch ganz leicht. Urlaubskurs. ISBN 978-3-19-107896-6
