= Howard Kreisel =

Scholar of Medieval Jewish Philosophy (born 1951)

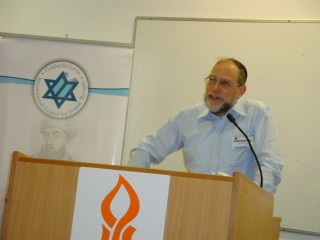
Howard Kreisel

Howard "Haim" Kreisel is a professor of medieval Jewish philosophy in the Goldstein-Goren Department of Jewish Thought at Ben-Gurion University of the Negev (emeritus) where he held the Miriam Martha Hubert Chair of Jewish Thought.

== Biography ==
Howard (Haim) Kreisel was born in New York in 1951. He received his B.A. (summa cum laude with honors in philosophy) at Brandeis University in 1972 and went on to complete his M.A. (1976) and Ph.D. (1981) at Brandeis in the Department of Near Eastern and Judaic Studies. His doctoral dissertation, Theories of Prophecy in Medieval Jewish Philosophy was written under the supervision of Alfred Ivry. He taught medieval Jewish studies for three years at the Reconstructionist Rabbinical College (Wyncote, Pennsylvania) before moving to Israel in 1983. He has taught at Ben-Gurion University of the Negev from 1983 till 2019 and held the Miriam Martha Hubert Chair in Jewish Thought. In 1995-1996 he served as a visiting professor at the University of Calgary in the departments of religion and philosophy. Among his administrative positions he served as the first chair of the newly formed Goldstein-Goren department of Jewish thought at Ben-Gurion University of the Negev (1998–2002), after leading the efforts to create the department. He subsequently became the director of the Goldstein-Goren International Center for Jewish Thought (2003–2022) and editor of the series he founded, Goldstein-Goren Library of Jewish Thought (Ben-Gurion University of the Negev Press). He is also the founder and editor-in-chief of the new annual journal sponsored by the center, Jewish Thought (the first volume appeared in 2019). To date, 6 volumes have appeared.

== Scholarship ==
Kreisel’s research covers the gamut of medieval Jewish philosophy. His particular interests lie in the areas of prophecy, medieval Jewish ethical and political philosophy as well as philosophical exegesis of the Bible. Over the past decade he has devoted most of his scholarly activity to producing critical annotated editions of important Jewish medieval treatises that have survived only in manuscript form, most notably works by Nissim of Marseilles, Moses Ibn Tibbon and Levi ben Avraham. All four volumes have appeared of the latter’s monumental encyclopedia, Livyat Hen. Together with a team of researchers, all former students of his, Kreisel subsequently completed a project to publish the five earliest supercommentaries on Abraham Ibn Ezra’s commentary on the Torah. More recently he published Judah Moskoni's lengthy supercommentary. He is the author of 11 books and over 60 scholarly articles. He has also edited or co-edited 7 books.Eight students completed their Ph.D. dissertations under his supervision, and three of the dissertations were subsequently published.

== Books ==
=== Dissertation ===
1. Kreisel, Howard T. (1980). Theories of prophecy (PhD thesis). Waltham, Mass.: Brandeis University.

=== Authored books ===
1. Maimonides’ Political Thought: Studies in Ethics, Law and the Human Ideal (New York: SUNY Press, 1999) 360 pages.
2. Ma`aseh Nissim by R. Nissim of Marseilles (Hebrew), critical annotated edition with introduction (Jerusalem: Mekize Nirdamim, 2000) 515 pages.
3. Prophecy: The History of an Idea in Medieval Jewish Philosophy (Dordrecht: Kluwer Academic Publishers, 2001). 669 pages.
4. Livyat Hen: Work of Creation by R. Levi ben Avraham (Hebrew) critical annotated edition with introduction and edition of section of poem Battei ha-Nefesh ve-ha-Lahashim (Jerusalem: World Union of Jewish Studies, 2004) 480 pages.
5. Livyat Hen: The Quality of Prophecy and the Secrets of the Torah by R. Levi ben Avraham,(Hebrew) critical annotated edition with introduction and edition of section of poem Battei ha-Nefesh ve-ha-Lahashim (Beer-Sheva: Ben-Gurion University of the Negev Press, 2007) 1023 + LXXX pages.
6. The Writings of R. Moshe Ibn Tibbon: Sefer Peah, Maamar HaTaninim, Perush ha-Azharot LeRav Shlomo Ibn Gabirol (Hebrew, together with Colette Sirat and Avraham Israel), critical annotated edition with introductions (Beer-Sheva: Ben-Gurion of the University Press, 2010) 440 pages.
7. Livyat Hen: Work of the Chariot by R. Levi ben Avraham,(Hebrew) critical annotated edition with introduction together with edition of part of section, “The Divine Science” and edition of part of poem Battei ha-Nefesh ve-ha-Lahashim on the Account of the Chariot (Jerusalem: World Union of Jewish Studies, 2013) 330 pages.
8. Livyat Hen: The Secrets of the Faith and the Gate of the Haggadah by R. Levi ben Avraham,(Hebrew), critical annotated edition with introduction and edition of section of poem Battei ha-Nefesh ve-ha-Lahashim (Beer-Sheva: Ben-Gurion University of the Negev Press, 2014) 540 pages.
9. Judaism as Philosophy: Studies in Maimonides and the Medieval Jewish Philosophers of Provence (Boston: Academic Studies Press, 2015) 473 pages.
10. Five Early Commentators on R. Abraham Ibn Ezra: The Earliest Supercommentaries on Ibn Ezra's Torah Commentary,(Hebrew), eclectic edition of the five earliest supercommentaries on Ibn Ezra (Elazer ben Mattitya, Yeshayah ben Meir, Joseph Kaspi, "Avvat Nephesh" and Moshe ben Yehudah min ha-Ne`arim) with introduction and full length articles on each of the commentators (in collaboration with Orly Shoshan, David Benzazon, Ofer Elior and Eliezer Davidovich) (Beer-Sheva: Ben-Gurion University of the Negev Press, 2017), 1041 pages.
11. Eben Ha-‘Ezer by R. Judah Leon ben Moses Moskoni, (Hebrew), edition of supercommentary on Ibn Ezra with introduction and notes (Beer-Sheva: Ben-Gurion University of the Negev Press, 2020), 3 volumes, 1475 pages.

=== Edited books ===
1. Shefa Tal: Studies in Jewish Thought in Honor of Bracha Sack (Hebrew; together with Zeev Gries and Boaz Huss) (Beer-Sheva: Ben-Gurion University of the Negev, 2004) 413 pages.
2. Study and Knowledge in Jewish Thought, vol. 1 (Beer-Sheva: Ben-Gurion University of the Negev Press, 2006) 373 pages.
3. Study and Knowledge in Jewish Thought (Hebrew), vol. 2 (Beer-Sheva: Ben-Gurion University of the Negev Press, 2006) 299 + xvii pages.
4. Tradition, Heterodoxy and Religious Culture: Judaism and Christianity in the Early Modern Period, (together with Chanita Goodblatt) (Beer-Sheva: Ben-Gurion University of the Negev Press, 2006) 488 pages.
5. By the Well: Studies in Jewish Philosophy and Halakhic Thought Presented to Gerald J. Blidstein (Hebrew), (together with U. Ehrlich and D. Lasker) (Beer-Sheva: Ben-Gurion University of the Negev Press, 2008) 708 pages.
6. Spiritual Authority: Struggles over Cultural Power in Jewish Thought (Hebrew and English), (together with B. Huss and U. Ehrlich) (Beer-Sheva: Ben-Gurion University of the Negev Press., 2009) 422 pages.
7. Reading the Bible in the Pre-Modern World: Interpretation, Performance and Image, (together with Chanita Goodblatt) (Beer-Sheva: Ben-Gurion University of the Negev Press, 2021).
