= Kriesel =

Kriesel is a surname. Notable people with the surname include:

- Bill Kriesel (born c. 1974), American college football coach
- Gregory Kriesel (born 1965), American musician
- John Kriesel (born 1981), American politician

== See also ==
- Kreisel (surname), another surname
