= Lutz Kreisel =

German set designer (born 1927)

Lutz Kreisel (born 1927) in Saxony, Germany, is a German set designer. He was the chief stage designer at the Mecklenburg State Theatre from 1971-2015.

== Life ==
Kreisel was born in Saxony. He studied at the Saxon State Theater and studied Fine Arts in Stage Design at the University of Dresden. He worked with directors such as Christoph Schroth, Werner Saldin and Bernd Reiner Krieger.

He often designs sets for the outdoor opera theater, the "Schweriner Schlossfestspiele". He typically designs his sets on paper first, without a stage present and tries to use the surrounding architecture and nature to create scenic spaces. He believes his theories on set design have played a large part in the success of the yearly, Schwerin Castle Festival. He has created sets for musicals, dramas and ballets.

He has been involved in over 160 productions. He has created sets every year for the Schwerin Castle Festival, to celebrate the 850th anniversary of the city of Schwerin, and for productions including Der Freischütz, Glückliche Reise, Maskenball, The Three Musketeers, The Picture of Dorian Gray, La forza del destino, Othello, The Flying Dutchman, Der Graf von Luxemburg, Carmen, and The Troubadour.

He cites Zorba, Un ballo in maschera and Der Kaiser von Atlantis as his favorite productions that he has been involved in.

His work over the years was eventually featured in a special exhibition called, "Szenische Räume - Arbeiten aus fünf Jahrzehnten" at the Mecklenburg State Theater to celebrate his 80th birthday.
