= Jacky Eeckelaert =

Belgian automotive engineer

- Born: Jacques Eeckelaert; 11 January 1955 (age 71); Antwerp, Belgium

Jacques "Jacky" Eeckelaert (born 11 January 1955) is a Belgian automotive engineer who has worked in many categories of motorsport. He currently works for Abt Sportsline as Technical director in the DTM.

== Career ==
A native of Antwerp, Eeckelaert studied mechanical engineering at the Catholic University of Leuven and then spent four years working in Ford's engine development department, before becoming head of the technical department of Champion's European wing.

He also competed as a racing driver, competing for privateer teams in Formula Ford and Formula Three. In 1985 he left Champion to become team manager of the Keerbergs Transport Racing team, which competed in the German and French F3 series. He moved to the DAMS International Formula 3000 team in 1991 and then to the Danielson team, which ran Peugeot 905 Spider sportscars, a year later.

In 1994, Eeckelaert moved directly into the employ of Peugeot Sport, successfully overseeing the marque's championship campaign in that year's French Supertouring Championship with Laurent Aïello. For 1995, he was placed in charge of Peugeot's Formula One engine-testing programme, in which capacity he liaised between the Jordan team and the Peugeot headquarters. For the 1998 season, Peugeot switched to supplying the Prost team, and Eeckelaert joined the outfit as its chief engineer, although his role was downgraded to cover only the test team the following year. At the end of 1999, he was offered a similar role at the Sauber team and two years later returned to the Grands Prix as Kimi Räikkönen's race engineer. In 2002, he was appointed the team's head of track engineering.

He moved to the Honda team in 2006 as chief engineer in the Advanced Research programme. In 2007, he was promoted to engineering director, after predecessor Mark Ellis moved to sister team Super Aguri. Eeckelaert himself then moved to Super Aguri, only for the team to shut down after running out money part-way through the 2008 season. After spending a year in sportscars, he returned to F1 in 2010 with the new HRT team, and has been placed in charge of the team's 2012 car after Geoff Willis left the team and plans to hire Jörg Zander fell through. The Hispania F112 will be the first F1 car over which Eeckelaert will have chief responsibility to design. Before the new car was launched, however, he left the team to work for former Hispania team principal Colin Kolles's sportscar team, which is running Lotus-badged LMP2 cars in the 2012 FIA World Endurance Championship season. His position at Hispania was taken by Chief Designer Jean-Claude Martens.

In November 2012 Eeckelaert moved to the German DTM team Abt Sportsline, where he works as technical director.
