= Willy Rampf =

German car engineer (born 1953)

- Born: June 20, 1953 (age 72); Düsseldorf, West Germany
- Occupation: Engineer
- Years active: 1979–present

Willy Rampf (born 20 June 1953) is a German car engineer who is currently a technical consultant for Williams Racing and was the former technical director of the Sauber Formula One team.

== Career ==
Rampf was born in Maria Thalheim, studied Automotive Engineering at the Munich University of Applied Sciences, and has worked as a development engineer for BMW since 1979. From 1989 to 1993, Rampf worked for BMW in South Africa, where he discovered Formula One.

The Sauber team made its debut in Formula One at the South African Grand Prix in 1993. Rampf was invited to the race, and half a year later he signed a contract to become race engineer for the Sauber team.

Rampf was the engineer of Sauber driver Heinz-Harald Frentzen for three years. In the 1997 season, he worked for drivers Nicola Larini, Norberto Fontana and Gianni Morbidelli. At the end of the 1997 season, Rampf returned to BMW, where he would lead the motorcycle project for the Dakar Rally. BMW motorcyclist Richard Sainct would win that race.

At the end of 1999, Rampf returned to Sauber, where he became technical director on 1 April 2000. He remained in that position when Sauber was taken over by BMW in 2005, and when the company withdrew its backing in 2009.

Rampf left his position at Sauber in April 2010, and was replaced by James Key.

He joined Volkswagen Motorsport as technical director in August 2011, overseeing the design of the Polo R WRC.
