= Sauber Grand Prix results =

These are the complete Grand Prix racing results for Sauber also including BMW Sauber and Kick Sauber.

== Complete Formula One results ==
(key)

| Year | Entrant | Chassis | Engine | Tyres | Drivers | 1 | 2 | 3 | 4 | 5 | 6 | 7 | 8 | 9 | 10 | 11 | 12 | 13 | 14 | 15 | 16 | 17 | 18 | 19 | 20 | 21 | 22 | 23 | 24 | Points | WCC |
Sauber
| 1993 | Team Sauber Formula 1 | C12 | Sauber (Ilmor) 2175 3.5 V10 | G | | RSA | BRA | EUR | SMR | ESP | MON | CAN | FRA | GBR | GER | HUN | BEL | ITA | POR | JPN | AUS | | | | | | | | | 12 | 7th |
| 1993 | Team Sauber Formula 1 | C12 | Sauber (Ilmor) 2175 3.5 V10 | G | (Austria) Karl Wendlinger | Ret | Ret | Ret | Ret | Ret | 13 | 6 | Ret | Ret | 9 | 6 | Ret | 4 | 5 | Ret | 15 | | | | | | | | | 12 | 7th |
| 1993 | Team Sauber Formula 1 | C12 | Sauber (Ilmor) 2175 3.5 V10 | G | (Finland) JJ Lehto | 5 | Ret | Ret | 4 | Ret | Ret | 7 | Ret | 8 | Ret | Ret | 9 | Ret | 7 | 8 | Ret | | | | | | | | | 12 | 7th |
| 1994 | Broker Sauber Mercedes | C13 | Mercedes 2175B 3.5 V10 | G | | BRA | PAC | SMR | MON | ESP | CAN | FRA | GBR | GER | HUN | BEL | ITA | POR | EUR | JPN | AUS | | | | | | | | | 12 | 8th |
| 1994 | Broker Sauber Mercedes | C13 | Mercedes 2175B 3.5 V10 | G | (Austria) Karl Wendlinger | 6 | Ret | 4 | DNS | | | | | | | | | | | | | | | | | | | | | 12 | 8th |
| 1994 | Broker Sauber Mercedes | C13 | Mercedes 2175B 3.5 V10 | G | (Italy) Andrea de Cesaris | | | | | | Ret | 6 | Ret | Ret | Ret | Ret | Ret | Ret | Ret | | | | | | | | | | | 12 | 8th |
| 1994 | Broker Sauber Mercedes | C13 | Mercedes 2175B 3.5 V10 | G | (Finland) JJ Lehto | | | | | | | | | | | | | | | Ret | 10 | | | | | | | | | 12 | 8th |
| 1994 | Broker Sauber Mercedes | C13 | Mercedes 2175B 3.5 V10 | G | (Germany) Heinz-Harald Frentzen | Ret | 5 | 7 | WD | Ret | Ret | 4 | 7 | Ret | Ret | Ret | Ret | Ret | 6 | 6 | 7 | | | | | | | | | 12 | 8th |
| 1995 | Red Bull Sauber Ford | C14 | Ford ECA Zetec-R 3.0 V8 | G | | BRA | ARG | SMR | ESP | MON | CAN | FRA | GBR | GER | HUN | BEL | ITA | POR | EUR | PAC | JPN | AUS | | | | | | | | 18 | 7th |
| 1995 | Red Bull Sauber Ford | C14 | Ford ECA Zetec-R 3.0 V8 | G | (Austria) Karl Wendlinger | Ret | Ret | Ret | 13 | | | | | | | | | | | | 10 | Ret | | | | | | | | 18 | 7th |
| 1995 | Red Bull Sauber Ford | C14 | Ford ECA Zetec-R 3.0 V8 | G | (France) Jean-Christophe Boullion | | | | | 8 | Ret | Ret | 9 | 5 | 10 | 11 | 6 | 12 | Ret | Ret | | | | | | | | | | 18 | 7th |
| 1995 | Red Bull Sauber Ford | C14 | Ford ECA Zetec-R 3.0 V8 | G | (Germany) Heinz-Harald Frentzen | Ret | 5 | 6 | 8 | 6 | Ret | 10 | 6 | Ret | 5 | 4 | 3 | 6 | Ret | 7 | 8 | Ret | | | | | | | | 18 | 7th |
| 1996 | Red Bull Sauber Ford | C15 | Ford JD Zetec-R 3.0 V10 | G | | AUS | BRA | ARG | EUR | SMR | MON | ESP | CAN | FRA | GBR | GER | HUN | BEL | ITA | POR | JPN | | | | | | | | | 11 | 7th |
| 1996 | Red Bull Sauber Ford | C15 | Ford JD Zetec-R 3.0 V10 | G | (United Kingdom) Johnny Herbert | DNS | Ret | 9 | 7 | Ret | 3 | Ret | 7 | DSQ | 9 | Ret | Ret | Ret | 9 | 8 | 10 | | | | | | | | | 11 | 7th |
| 1996 | Red Bull Sauber Ford | C15 | Ford JD Zetec-R 3.0 V10 | G | (Germany) Heinz-Harald Frentzen | 8 | Ret | Ret | Ret | Ret | 4 | 4 | Ret | Ret | 8 | 8 | Ret | Ret | Ret | 7 | 6 | | | | | | | | | 11 | 7th |
| 1997 | Red Bull Sauber Petronas | C16 | Petronas SPE-01 3.0 V10 | G | | AUS | BRA | ARG | SMR | MON | ESP | CAN | FRA | GBR | GER | HUN | BEL | ITA | AUT | LUX | JPN | EUR | | | | | | | | 16 | 7th |
| 1997 | Red Bull Sauber Petronas | C16 | Petronas SPE-01 3.0 V10 | G | (United Kingdom) Johnny Herbert | Ret | 7 | 4 | Ret | Ret | 5 | 5 | 8 | Ret | Ret | 3 | 4 | Ret | 8 | 7 | 6 | 8 | | | | | | | | 16 | 7th |
| 1997 | Red Bull Sauber Petronas | C16 | Petronas SPE-01 3.0 V10 | G | (Italy) Nicola Larini | 6 | 11 | Ret | 7 | Ret | | | | | | | | | | | | | | | | | | | | 16 | 7th |
| 1997 | Red Bull Sauber Petronas | C16 | Petronas SPE-01 3.0 V10 | G | (Italy) Gianni Morbidelli | | | | | | 14 | 10 | | | | Ret | 9 | 12 | 9 | 9 | DNS | | | | | | | | | 16 | 7th |
| 1997 | Red Bull Sauber Petronas | C16 | Petronas SPE-01 3.0 V10 | G | (Argentina) Norberto Fontana | | | | | | | | Ret | 9 | 9 | | | | | | | 14 | | | | | | | | 16 | 7th |
| 1998 | Red Bull Sauber Petronas | C17 | Petronas SPE-01D 3.0 V10 | G | | AUS | BRA | ARG | SMR | ESP | MON | CAN | FRA | GBR | AUT | GER | HUN | BEL | ITA | LUX | JPN | | | | | | | | | 10 | 6th |
| 1998 | Red Bull Sauber Petronas | C17 | Petronas SPE-01D 3.0 V10 | G | (France) Jean Alesi | Ret | 9 | 5 | 6 | 10 | 12 | Ret | 7 | Ret | Ret | 10 | 7 | 3 | 5 | 10 | 7 | | | | | | | | | 10 | 6th |
| 1998 | Red Bull Sauber Petronas | C17 | Petronas SPE-01D 3.0 V10 | G | (United Kingdom) Johnny Herbert | 6 | 11 | Ret | Ret | 7 | 7 | Ret | 8 | Ret | 8 | Ret | 10 | Ret | Ret | Ret | 10 | | | | | | | | | 10 | 6th |
| 1999 | Red Bull Sauber Petronas | C18 | Petronas SPE-03A 3.0 V10 | B | | AUS | BRA | SMR | MON | ESP | CAN | FRA | GBR | AUT | GER | HUN | BEL | ITA | EUR | MAL | JPN | | | | | | | | | 5 | 8th |
| 1999 | Red Bull Sauber Petronas | C18 | Petronas SPE-03A 3.0 V10 | B | (France) Jean Alesi | Ret | Ret | 6 | Ret | Ret | Ret | Ret | 14 | Ret | 8 | 16 | 9 | 9 | Ret | 7 | 6 | | | | | | | | | 5 | 8th |
| 1999 | Red Bull Sauber Petronas | C18 | Petronas SPE-03A 3.0 V10 | B | (Brazil) Pedro Diniz | Ret | Ret | Ret | Ret | Ret | 6 | Ret | 6 | 6 | Ret | Ret | Ret | Ret | Ret | Ret | 11 | | | | | | | | | 5 | 8th |
| 2000 | Red Bull Sauber Petronas | C19 | Petronas SPE 04A 3.0 V10 | B | | AUS | BRA | SMR | GBR | ESP | EUR | MON | CAN | FRA | AUT | GER | HUN | BEL | ITA | USA | JPN | MAL | | | | | | | | 6 | 8th |
| 2000 | Red Bull Sauber Petronas | C19 | Petronas SPE 04A 3.0 V10 | B | (Brazil) Pedro Diniz | Ret | DNS | 8 | 11 | Ret | 7 | Ret | 10 | 11 | 9 | Ret | Ret | 11 | 8 | 8 | 11 | Ret | | | | | | | | 6 | 8th |
| 2000 | Red Bull Sauber Petronas | C19 | Petronas SPE 04A 3.0 V10 | B | (Finland) Mika Salo | DSQ | DNS | 6 | 8 | 7 | Ret | 5 | Ret | 10 | 6 | 5 | 10 | 9 | 7 | Ret | 10 | 8 | | | | | | | | 6 | 8th |
| 2001 | Red Bull Sauber Petronas | C20 | Petronas 01A 3.0 V10 | B | | AUS | MAL | BRA | SMR | ESP | AUT | MON | CAN | EUR | FRA | GBR | GER | HUN | BEL | ITA | USA | JPN | | | | | | | | 21 | 4th |
| 2001 | Red Bull Sauber Petronas | C20 | Petronas 01A 3.0 V10 | B | (Germany) Nick Heidfeld | 4 | Ret | 3 | 7 | 6 | 9 | Ret | Ret | Ret | 6 | 6 | Ret | 6 | Ret | 11 | 6 | 9 | | | | | | | | 21 | 4th |
| 2001 | Red Bull Sauber Petronas | C20 | Petronas 01A 3.0 V10 | B | (Finland) Kimi Räikkönen | 6 | Ret | Ret | Ret | 8 | 4 | 10 | 4 | 10 | 7 | 5 | Ret | 7 | DNS | 7 | Ret | Ret | | | | | | | | 21 | 4th |
| 2002 | Sauber Petronas | C21 | Petronas 02A 3.0 V10 | B | | AUS | MAL | BRA | SMR | ESP | AUT | MON | CAN | EUR | GBR | FRA | GER | HUN | BEL | ITA | USA | JPN | | | | | | | | 11 | 5th |
| 2002 | Sauber Petronas | C21 | Petronas 02A 3.0 V10 | B | (Germany) Nick Heidfeld | Ret | 5 | Ret | 10 | 4 | Ret | 8 | 12 | 7 | 6 | 7 | 6 | 9 | 10 | 10 | 9 | 7 | | | | | | | | 11 | 5th |
| 2002 | Sauber Petronas | C21 | Petronas 02A 3.0 V10 | B | (Brazil) Felipe Massa | Ret | 6 | Ret | 8 | 5 | Ret | Ret | 9 | 6 | 9 | Ret | 7 | 7 | Ret | Ret | | Ret | | | | | | | | 11 | 5th |
| 2002 | Sauber Petronas | C21 | Petronas 02A 3.0 V10 | B | (Germany) Heinz-Harald Frentzen | | | | | | | | | | | | | | | | 13 | | | | | | | | | 11 | 5th |
| 2003 | Sauber Petronas | C22 | Petronas 03A 3.0 V10 | B | | AUS | MAL | BRA | SMR | ESP | AUT | MON | CAN | EUR | FRA | GBR | GER | HUN | ITA | USA | JPN | | | | | | | | | 19 | 6th |
| 2003 | Sauber Petronas | C22 | Petronas 03A 3.0 V10 | B | (Germany) Nick Heidfeld | Ret | 8 | Ret | 10 | 10 | Ret | 11 | Ret | 8 | 13 | 17 | 10 | 9 | 9 | 5 | 9 | | | | | | | | | 19 | 6th |
| 2003 | Sauber Petronas | C22 | Petronas 03A 3.0 V10 | B | (Germany) Heinz-Harald Frentzen | 6 | 9 | 5 | 11 | Ret | DNS | Ret | Ret | 9 | 12 | 12 | Ret | Ret | 13^{†} | 3 | Ret | | | | | | | | | 19 | 6th |
| 2004 | Sauber Petronas | C23 | Petronas 04A 3.0 V10 90° | B | | AUS | MAL | BHR | SMR | ESP | MON | EUR | CAN | USA | FRA | GBR | GER | HUN | BEL | ITA | CHN | JPN | BRA | | | | | | | 34 | 6th |
| 2004 | Sauber Petronas | C23 | Petronas 04A 3.0 V10 90° | B | (Italy) Giancarlo Fisichella | 10 | 11 | 11 | 9 | 7 | Ret | 6 | 4 | 9^{†} | 12 | 6 | 9 | 8 | 5 | 8 | 7 | 8 | 9 | | | | | | | 34 | 6th |
| 2004 | Sauber Petronas | C23 | Petronas 04A 3.0 V10 90° | B | (Brazil) Felipe Massa | Ret | 8 | 12 | 10 | 9 | 5 | 9 | Ret | Ret | 13 | 9 | 13 | Ret | 4 | 12 | 8 | 9 | 8 | | | | | | | 34 | 6th |
| 2005 | Sauber Petronas | C24 | Petronas 05A 3.0 V10 | MI | | AUS | MAL | BHR | SMR | ESP | MON | EUR | CAN | USA | FRA | GBR | GER | HUN | TUR | ITA | BEL | BRA | JPN | CHN | | | | | | 20 | 8th |
| 2005 | Sauber Petronas | C24 | Petronas 05A 3.0 V10 | MI | (Canada) Jacques Villeneuve | 13 | Ret | 11^{†} | 4 | Ret | 11 | 13 | 9 | DNS | 8 | 14 | 15 | Ret | 11 | 11 | 6 | 12 | 12 | 10 | | | | | | 20 | 8th |
| 2005 | Sauber Petronas | C24 | Petronas 05A 3.0 V10 | MI | (Brazil) Felipe Massa | 10 | 10 | 7 | 10 | 11^{†} | 9 | 14 | 4 | DNS | Ret | 10 | 8 | 14 | Ret | 9 | 10 | 11 | 10 | 6 | | | | | | 20 | 8th |
BMW Sauber
| 2006 | BMW Sauber F1 Team | F1.06 | BMW P86/6 2.4 V8 | MI | | BHR | MAL | AUS | SMR | EUR | ESP | MON | GBR | CAN | USA | FRA | GER | HUN | TUR | ITA | CHN | JPN | BRA | | | | | | | 36 | 5th |
| 2006 | BMW Sauber F1 Team | F1.06 | BMW P86/6 2.4 V8 | MI | (Germany) Nick Heidfeld | 12 | Ret | 4 | 13 | 10 | 8 | 7 | 7 | 7 | Ret | 8 | Ret | 3 | 14 | 8 | 7 | 8 | 17^{†} | | | | | | | 36 | 5th |
| 2006 | BMW Sauber F1 Team | F1.06 | BMW P86/6 2.4 V8 | MI | (Canada) Jacques Villeneuve | Ret | 7 | 6 | 12 | 8 | 12 | 14 | 8 | Ret | Ret | 11 | Ret | | | | | | | | | | | | | 36 | 5th |
| 2006 | BMW Sauber F1 Team | F1.06 | BMW P86/6 2.4 V8 | MI | (Poland) Robert Kubica | | | | | | | | | | | | | DSQ | 12 | 3 | 13 | 9 | 9 | | | | | | | 36 | 5th |
| 2007 | BMW Sauber F1 Team | F1.07 | BMW P86/7 2.4 V8 | B | | AUS | MAL | BHR | ESP | MON | CAN | USA | FRA | GBR | EUR | HUN | TUR | ITA | BEL | JPN | CHN | BRA | | | | | | | | 101 | 2nd |
| 2007 | BMW Sauber F1 Team | F1.07 | BMW P86/7 2.4 V8 | B | (Germany) Nick Heidfeld | 4 | 4 | 4 | Ret | 6 | 2 | Ret | 5 | 6 | 6 | 3 | 4 | 4 | 5 | 14^{†} | 7 | 6 | | | | | | | | 101 | 2nd |
| 2007 | BMW Sauber F1 Team | F1.07 | BMW P86/7 2.4 V8 | B | (Poland) Robert Kubica | Ret | 18 | 6 | 4 | 5 | Ret | | 4 | 4 | 7 | 5 | 8 | 5 | 9 | 7 | Ret | 5 | | | | | | | | 101 | 2nd |
| 2007 | BMW Sauber F1 Team | F1.07 | BMW P86/7 2.4 V8 | B | (Germany) Sebastian Vettel | | | | | | | 8 | | | | | | | | | | | | | | | | | | 101 | 2nd |
| 2008 | BMW Sauber F1 Team | F1.08 | BMW P86/8 2.4 V8 | B | | AUS | MAL | BHR | ESP | TUR | MON | CAN | FRA | GBR | GER | HUN | EUR | BEL | ITA | SIN | JPN | CHN | BRA | | | | | | | 135 | 3rd |
| 2008 | BMW Sauber F1 Team | F1.08 | BMW P86/8 2.4 V8 | B | (Germany) Nick Heidfeld | 2 | 6^{F} | 4 | 9 | 5 | 14 | 2 | 13 | 2 | 4^{F} | 10 | 9 | 2 | 5 | 6 | 9 | 5 | 10 | | | | | | | 135 | 3rd |
| 2008 | BMW Sauber F1 Team | F1.08 | BMW P86/8 2.4 V8 | B | (Poland) Robert Kubica | Ret | 2 | 3^{P} | 4 | 4 | 2 | 1 | 5 | Ret | 7 | 8 | 3 | 6 | 3 | 11 | 2 | 6 | 11 | | | | | | | 135 | 3rd |
| 2009 | BMW Sauber F1 Team | F1.09 | BMW P86/9 2.4 V8 | B | | AUS | MAL | CHN | BHR | ESP | MON | TUR | GBR | GER | HUN | EUR | BEL | ITA | SIN | JPN | BRA | ABU | | | | | | | | 36 | 6th |
| 2009 | BMW Sauber F1 Team | F1.09 | BMW P86/9 2.4 V8 | B | (Poland) Robert Kubica | 14^{†} | Ret | 13 | 18 | 11 | Ret | 7 | 13 | 14 | 13 | 8 | 4 | Ret | 8 | 9 | 2 | 10 | | | | | | | | 36 | 6th |
| 2009 | BMW Sauber F1 Team | F1.09 | BMW P86/9 2.4 V8 | B | (Germany) Nick Heidfeld | 10 | 2^{‡} | 12 | 19 | 7 | 11 | 11 | 15 | 10 | 11 | 11 | 5 | 7 | Ret | 6 | Ret | 5 | | | | | | | | 36 | 6th |
Sauber
| 2010 | BMW Sauber F1 Team | C29 | Ferrari 056 2.4 V8 | B | | BHR | AUS | MAL | CHN | ESP | MON | TUR | CAN | EUR | GBR | GER | HUN | BEL | ITA | SIN | JPN | KOR | BRA | ABU | | | | | | 44 | 8th |
| 2010 | BMW Sauber F1 Team | C29 | Ferrari 056 2.4 V8 | B | (Spain) Pedro de la Rosa | Ret | 12 | DNS | Ret | Ret | Ret | 11 | Ret | 12 | Ret | 14 | 7 | 11 | 14 | | | | | | | | | | | 44 | 8th |
| 2010 | BMW Sauber F1 Team | C29 | Ferrari 056 2.4 V8 | B | (Germany) Nick Heidfeld | | | | | | | | | | | | | | | Ret | 8 | 9 | 17 | 11 | | | | | | 44 | 8th |
| 2010 | BMW Sauber F1 Team | C29 | Ferrari 056 2.4 V8 | B | (Japan) Kamui Kobayashi | Ret | Ret | Ret | Ret | 12 | Ret | 10 | Ret | 7 | 6 | 11 | 9 | 8 | Ret | Ret | 7 | 8 | 10 | 14 | | | | | | 44 | 8th |
| 2011 | Sauber F1 Team | C30 | Ferrari 056 2.4 V8 | P | | AUS | MAL | CHN | TUR | ESP | MON | CAN | EUR | GBR | GER | HUN | BEL | ITA | SIN | JPN | KOR | IND | ABU | BRA | | | | | | 44 | 7th |
| 2011 | Sauber F1 Team | C30 | Ferrari 056 2.4 V8 | P | (Japan) Kamui Kobayashi | DSQ | 7 | 10 | 10 | 10 | 5 | 7 | 16 | Ret | 9 | 11 | 12 | Ret | 14 | 13 | 15 | Ret | 10 | 9 | | | | | | 44 | 7th |
| 2011 | Sauber F1 Team | C30 | Ferrari 056 2.4 V8 | P | (Mexico) Sergio Pérez | DSQ | Ret | 17 | 14 | 9 | DNS | PO | 11 | 7 | 11 | 15 | Ret | Ret | 10 | 8 | 16 | 10 | 11 | 13 | | | | | | 44 | 7th |
| 2011 | Sauber F1 Team | C30 | Ferrari 056 2.4 V8 | P | (Spain) Pedro de la Rosa | | | | | | | 12 | | | | | | | | | | | | | | | | | | 44 | 7th |
| 2012 | Sauber F1 Team | C31 | Ferrari 056 2.4 V8 | P | | AUS | MAL | CHN | BHR | ESP | MON | CAN | EUR | GBR | GER | HUN | BEL | ITA | SIN | JPN | KOR | IND | ABU | USA | BRA | | | | | 126 | 6th |
| 2012 | Sauber F1 Team | C31 | Ferrari 056 2.4 V8 | P | (Japan) Kamui Kobayashi | 6 | Ret | 10^{F} | 13 | 5 | Ret | 9 | Ret | 11 | 4 | 18^{†} | 13 | 9 | 13 | 3 | Ret | 14 | 6 | 14 | 9 | | | | | 126 | 6th |
| 2012 | Sauber F1 Team | C31 | Ferrari 056 2.4 V8 | P | (Mexico) Sergio Pérez | 8 | 2 | 11 | 11 | Ret | 11^{F} | 3 | 9 | Ret | 6 | 14 | Ret | 2 | 10 | Ret | 11 | Ret | 15 | 11 | Ret | | | | | 126 | 6th |
| 2013 | Sauber F1 Team | C32 | Ferrari 056 2.4 V8 | P | | AUS | MAL | CHN | BHR | ESP | MON | CAN | GBR | GER | HUN | BEL | ITA | SIN | KOR | JPN | IND | ABU | USA | BRA | | | | | | 57 | 7th |
| 2013 | Sauber F1 Team | C32 | Ferrari 056 2.4 V8 | P | (Germany) Nico Hülkenberg | DNS | 8 | 10 | 12 | 15 | 11 | Ret | 10 | 10 | 11 | 13 | 5 | 9 | 4 | 6 | 19^{†} | 14 | 6 | 8 | | | | | | 57 | 7th |
| 2013 | Sauber F1 Team | C32 | Ferrari 056 2.4 V8 | P | (Mexico) Esteban Gutiérrez | 13 | 12 | Ret | 18 | 11^{F} | 13 | 20^{†} | 14 | 14 | Ret | 14 | 13 | 12 | 11 | 7 | 15 | 13 | 13 | 12 | | | | | | 57 | 7th |
| 2014 | Sauber F1 Team | C33 | Ferrari 059/3 1.6 V6 t | P | | AUS | MAL | BHR | CHN | ESP | MON | CAN | AUT | GBR | GER | HUN | BEL | ITA | SIN | JPN | RUS | USA | BRA | ABU | | | | | | 0 | 10th |
| 2014 | Sauber F1 Team | C33 | Ferrari 059/3 1.6 V6 t | P | (Mexico) Esteban Gutiérrez | 12 | Ret | Ret | 16 | 16 | Ret | 14^{†} | 19 | Ret | 14 | Ret | 15 | 20 | Ret | 13 | 15 | 14 | 14 | 15 | | | | | | 0 | 10th |
| 2014 | Sauber F1 Team | C33 | Ferrari 059/3 1.6 V6 t | P | (Germany) Adrian Sutil | 11 | Ret | Ret | Ret | 17 | Ret | 13 | 13 | 13 | Ret | 11 | 14 | 15 | Ret | 21^{†} | 16 | Ret | 16 | 16 | | | | | | 0 | 10th |
| 2015 | Sauber F1 Team | C34 | Ferrari 060 1.6 V6 t | P | | AUS | MAL | CHN | BHR | ESP | MON | CAN | AUT | GBR | HUN | BEL | ITA | SIN | JPN | RUS | USA | MEX | BRA | ABU | | | | | | 36 | 8th |
| 2015 | Sauber F1 Team | C34 | Ferrari 060 1.6 V6 t | P | (Sweden) Marcus Ericsson | 8 | Ret | 10 | 14 | 14 | 13 | 14 | 13 | 11 | 10 | 10 | 9 | 11 | 14 | Ret | Ret | 12 | 16 | 14 | | | | | | 36 | 8th |
| 2015 | Sauber F1 Team | C34 | Ferrari 060 1.6 V6 t | P | (Brazil) Felipe Nasr | 5 | 12 | 8 | 12 | 12 | 9 | 16 | 11 | DNS | 11 | 11 | 13 | 10 | 20^{†} | 6 | 9 | Ret | 13 | 15 | | | | | | 36 | 8th |
| 2016 | Sauber F1 Team | C35 | Ferrari 061 1.6 V6 t | P | | AUS | BHR | CHN | RUS | ESP | MON | CAN | EUR | AUT | GBR | HUN | GER | BEL | ITA | SIN | MAL | JPN | USA | MEX | BRA | ABU | | | | 2 | 10th |
| 2016 | Sauber F1 Team | C35 | Ferrari 061 1.6 V6 t | P | (Sweden) Marcus Ericsson | Ret | 12 | 16 | 14 | 12 | Ret | 15 | 17 | 15 | Ret | 20 | 18 | Ret | 16 | 17 | 12 | 15 | 14 | 11 | Ret | 15 | | | | 2 | 10th |
| 2016 | Sauber F1 Team | C35 | Ferrari 061 1.6 V6 t | P | (Brazil) Felipe Nasr | 15 | 14 | 20 | 16 | 14 | Ret | 18 | 12 | 13 | 15 | 17 | Ret | 17 | Ret | 13 | Ret | 19 | 15 | 15 | 9 | 16 | | | | 2 | 10th |
| 2017 | Sauber F1 Team | C36 | Ferrari 061 1.6 V6 t | P | | AUS | CHN | BHR | RUS | ESP | MON | CAN | AZE | AUT | GBR | HUN | BEL | ITA | SIN | MAL | JPN | USA | MEX | BRA | ABU | | | | | 5 | 10th |
| 2017 | Sauber F1 Team | C36 | Ferrari 061 1.6 V6 t | P | (Sweden) Marcus Ericsson | Ret | 15 | Ret | 15 | 11 | Ret | 13 | 11 | 15 | 14 | 16 | 16 | 18^{†} | Ret | 18 | Ret | 15 | Ret | 13 | 17 | | | | | 5 | 10th |
| 2017 | Sauber F1 Team | C36 | Ferrari 061 1.6 V6 t | P | (Germany) Pascal Wehrlein | WD | | 11 | 16 | 8 | Ret | 15 | 10 | 14 | 17 | 15 | Ret | 16 | 12 | 17 | 15 | Ret | 14 | 14 | 14 | | | | | 5 | 10th |
| 2017 | Sauber F1 Team | C36 | Ferrari 061 1.6 V6 t | P | (Italy) Antonio Giovinazzi | 12 | Ret | | | | | | | | | | | | | | | | | | | | | | | 5 | 10th |
| 2018 | Alfa Romeo Sauber F1 Team | C37 | Ferrari 062 EVO 1.6 V6 t | P | | AUS | BHR | CHN | AZE | ESP | MON | CAN | FRA | AUT | GBR | GER | HUN | BEL | ITA | SIN | RUS | JPN | USA | MEX | BRA | ABU | | | | 48 | 8th |
| 2018 | Alfa Romeo Sauber F1 Team | C37 | Ferrari 062 EVO 1.6 V6 t | P | (Sweden) Marcus Ericsson | Ret | 9 | 16 | 11 | 13 | 11 | 15 | 13 | 10 | Ret | 9 | 15 | 10 | 15 | 11 | 13 | 12 | 10 | 9 | Ret | Ret | | | | 48 | 8th |
| 2018 | Alfa Romeo Sauber F1 Team | C37 | Ferrari 062 EVO 1.6 V6 t | P | (Monaco) Charles Leclerc | 13 | 12 | 19 | 6 | 10 | 18^{†} | 10 | 10 | 9 | Ret | 15 | Ret | Ret | 11 | 9 | 7 | Ret | Ret | 7 | 7 | 7 | | | | 48 | 8th |
2019–2023: Sauber Motorsport competed as Alfa Romeo (results)
| 2024 | Stake F1 Team Kick Sauber | C44 | Ferrari 066/12 1.6 V6 t | P | | BHR | SAU | AUS | JPN | CHN | MIA | EMI | MON | CAN | ESP | AUT | GBR | HUN | BEL | NED | ITA | AZE | SIN | USA | MXC | SAP | LVG | QAT | ABU | 4 | 10th |
| 2024 | Stake F1 Team Kick Sauber | C44 | Ferrari 066/12 1.6 V6 t | P | (Finland) Valtteri Bottas | 19 | 17 | 14 | 14 | Ret | 16 | 18 | 13 | 13 | 16 | 16 | 15 | 16 | 15 | 19 | 16 | 16 | 16 | 17 | 14 | 13 | 18 | 11 | Ret | 4 | 10th |
| 2024 | Stake F1 Team Kick Sauber | C44 | Ferrari 066/12 1.6 V6 t | P | (China) Zhou Guanyu | 11 | 18 | 15 | Ret | 14 | 14 | 15 | 16 | 15 | 13 | 17 | 18 | 19 | Ret | 20 | 18 | 14 | 15 | 19 | 15 | 15 | 13 | 8 | 13 | 4 | 10th |
| 2025 | Stake F1 Team Kick Sauber | C45 | Ferrari 066/12 1.6 V6 t | P | | AUS | CHN | JPN | BHR | SAU | MIA | EMI | MON | ESP | CAN | AUT | GBR | BEL | HUN | NED | ITA | AZE | SIN | USA | MXC | SAP | LVG | QAT | ABU | 70 | 9th |
| 2025 | Stake F1 Team Kick Sauber | C45 | Ferrari 066/12 1.6 V6 t | P | (Brazil) Gabriel Bortoleto | Ret | 14 | 19 | 18 | 18 | Ret | 18 | 14 | 12 | 14 | 8 | Ret | 9 | 6 | 15 | 8 | 11 | 17 | 18 | 10 | Ret | Ret | 13 | 11 | 70 | 9th |
| 2025 | Stake F1 Team Kick Sauber | C45 | Ferrari 066/12 1.6 V6 t | P | (Germany) Nico Hülkenberg | 7 | 15 | 16 | DSQ | 15 | 14 | 12 | 16 | 5 | 8 | 9 | 3 | 12 | 13 | 14 | DNS | 16 | 20 | 8 | Ret | 9 | 7 | Ret | 9 | 70 | 9th |

Notes

- ^{†} – The driver did not finish the Grand Prix, but was classified as he completed over 90% of the race distance.
- ^{‡} – Half points awarded as less than 75% of race distance was completed.
