= Sauber C20 =

Formula One racing car

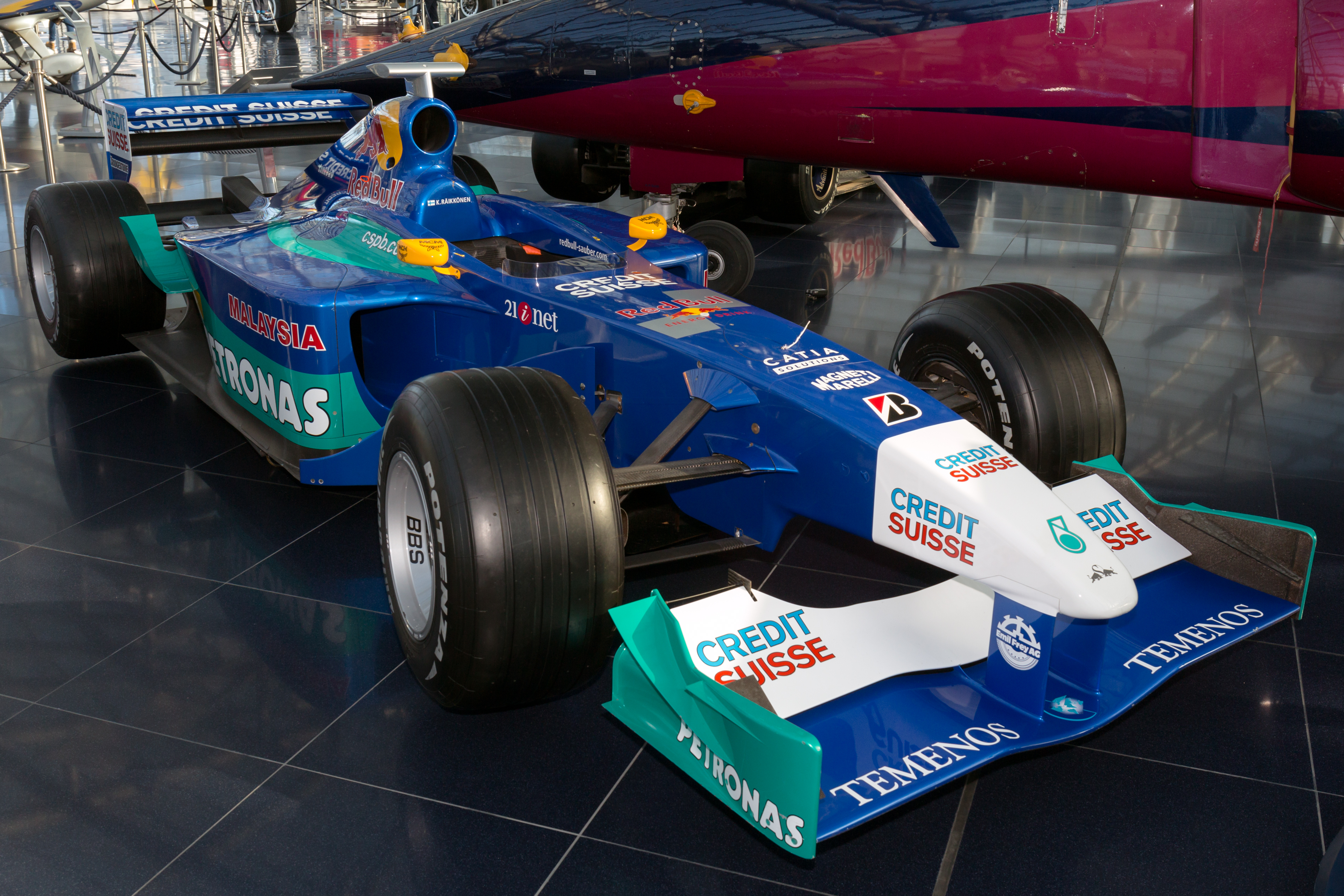
- The C20 of Kimi Räikkönen on display at the Hangar-7 Museum
- Category: Formula One
- Constructor: Sauber
- Designers: Willy Rampf (Technical Director); Osamu Goto (Engine Director); Leo Ress (Head of R&D); Sergio Rinland (Chief Designer); Ian Thomson (Head of Composite Design); Matt Cranor (Head of Mechanical Design); Ruedi Schorno (Head of Systems Engineering); Seamus Mullarkey (Head of Aerodynamics); Mike Jennings (Chief Aerodynamicist)
- Predecessor: Sauber C19
- Successor: Sauber C21

Technical specifications
- Chassis: Moulded carbon fibre composite structure
- Suspension (front): Double wishbones, pushrod
- Suspension (rear): Double wishbones, pushrod
- Engine: Petronas 01A (Ferrari Tipo 049) 3.0 litres 90-degree V10 Normally aspirated mid mounted
- Transmission: Sauber seven-speed longitudinal automatic sequential
- Fuel: Shell
- Lubricants: Petronas
- Tyres: Bridgestone

Competition history
- Notable entrants: Red Bull Sauber Petronas
- Notable drivers: 16. (Germany) Nick Heidfeld; 17. (Finland) Kimi Räikkönen
- Debut: 2001 Australian Grand Prix
- Last event: 2001 Japanese Grand Prix
Races	Wins	Poles	F/Laps
17	0	0	0
- Constructors' Championships: 0
- Drivers' Championships: 0

The Sauber C20 was the car with which the Sauber team competed in the 2001 Formula One World Championship. It was powered by a Petronas-branded '01A' 3.0-litre V10, supplied by Scuderia Ferrari. The C20 was notable not only for its eventual position in the Constructors' World Championship but also for a new type of front suspension mounting: the "twin keel".

== The twin keel ==
The effect of airflow underneath the nose had first become apparent in the early 1990s. By the end of the decade, most teams had settled for a design where both lower front suspension arms were mounted from a single longitudinal "keel" running underneath the nose. For 2001, the FIA introduced a regulation lifting the sides of the front wing by 50mm, in order to reduce downforce and cut cornering speeds.

Sauber had introduced separate pylons for each of the front suspension mounts on their previous car, the C19. For the C20, the area between the front and back mounting points on each side was filled in, creating two longitudinal keels running underneath the sides of the nose. Sergio Rinland designed the car, and then promptly left the team to join Arrows, leaving the C20's development in the hands of Willy Rampf.

Despite operating on a relatively modest budget, weight saving was a major consideration in the design of the car, and the team spent 35 weeks perfecting the aerodynamic package in the wind tunnel during the design phase.

== Drivers ==
In contrast to the previous season's experienced pairing of Mika Salo and Pedro Diniz, Peter Sauber signed Germany's Nick Heidfeld and Finnish rookie Kimi Räikkönen. His lack of experience prompted some drivers and FIA officials, including Max Mosley, to question the wisdom of this decision. Heidfeld had made his debut with Prost Grand Prix in 2000, but Räikkönen was a 21-year-old whose only previous single-seater formula experience amounted to one and a half seasons in British Formula Renault from 1999 to 2000, albeit culminating in a title win.

However, the young Finn's performances belied his age and lack of experience, with a point-scoring finish on his debut and a further four points-scoring finishes throughout the year. Heidfeld achieved a podium (one of six in Sauber's history) with third place in the Brazilian Grand Prix and scored points on six other occasions.

== Constructors' World Championship ==
The C20 turned out to be one of Sauber's most competitive chassis, providing the team with a points total of 21 and fourth place in the Constructors' World Championship standings.

The C20 achieved 11 points finishes and 10 non-scoring finishes from 33 starts.

== Sponsorship and livery ==
As with all Sauber models between 1995 and 2003, the choice of paint color was based on the colors of the main sponsors. Most of the chassis was in the blue of the beverage manufacturer Red Bull, the sides were painted in Petronas cyan. In addition to the two previous main sponsors, the Swiss bank Credit Suisse also came to the fore as a new sponsor. For this reason, the vehicle nose was painted white for the first time.

A Malaysian flag on the engine cover at the Malaysian Grand Prix.

== Complete Formula One results ==
(key) (results in bold indicate pole position)

Year	Team	Engine	Tyres	Drivers	1	2	3	4	5	6	7	8	9	10	11	12	13	14	15	16	17	Points	WCC
2001	Red Bull Sauber Petronas	Petronas V10*	**B**		AUS	MAL	BRA	SMR	ESP	AUT	MON	CAN	EUR	FRA	GBR	GER	HUN	BEL	ITA	USA	JPN	21	4th
2001	Red Bull Sauber Petronas	Petronas V10*	**B**	(Germany) Nick Heidfeld	4	Ret	3	7	6	9	Ret	Ret	Ret	6	6	Ret	6	Ret	11	6	9	21	4th
2001	Red Bull Sauber Petronas	Petronas V10*	**B**	(Finland) Kimi Räikkönen	6	Ret	Ret	Ret	8	4	10	4	10	7	5	Ret	7	DNS	7	Ret	Ret	21	4th

* Denotes Ferrari-built engines, badged as Petronas
