= Sauber C21 =

Formula One racing car

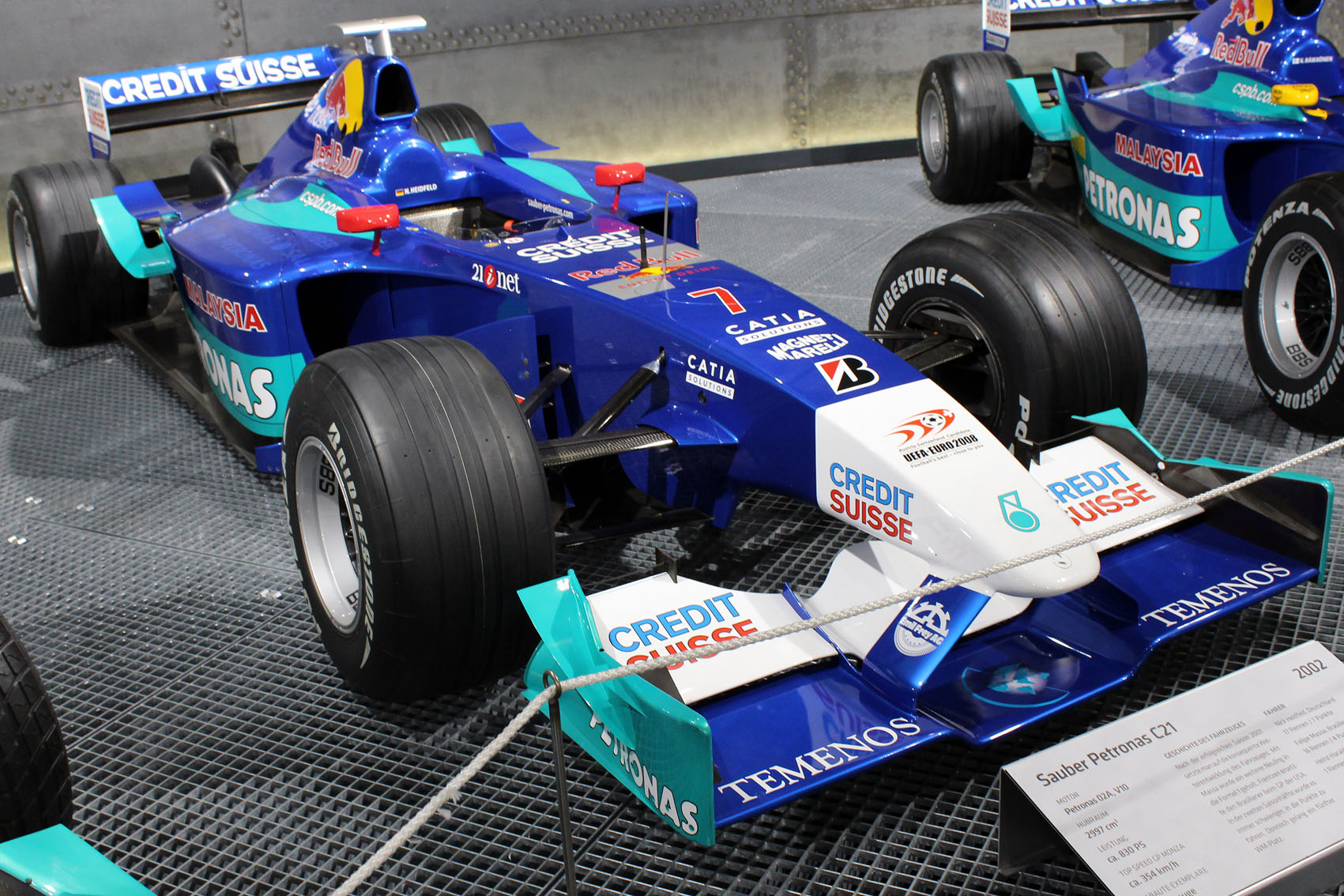
- Category: Formula One
- Constructor: Sauber
- Designers: Willy Rampf (Technical Director); Osamu Goto (Engine Director); Leo Ress (Engineering Director); Christoph Zimmermann (Head of Composite Design); Matt Cranor (Head of Mechanical Design); Ruedi Schorno (Head of Systems Engineering); Seamus Mullarkey (Head of Aerodynamics); Dirk de Beer (Principal Aerodynamicist)
- Predecessor: Sauber C20
- Successor: Sauber C22

Technical specifications
- Chassis: carbon-fibre monocoque
- Suspension (front): double wishbones, pushrod-activated, in-board spring, damper units
- Suspension (rear): double wishbones, pushrod-activated, in-board spring, damper units
- Engine: Petronas 02A (Ferrari Tipo 050) V10 (90°) naturally aspirated
- Transmission: Sauber 7-speed longitudinal automatic sequential
- Fuel: Shell
- Lubricants: Petronas
- Tyres: Bridgestone

Competition history
- Notable entrants: Sauber Petronas
- Notable drivers: 7. (Germany) Nick Heidfeld; 8. (Brazil) Felipe Massa; 8. (Germany) Heinz-Harald Frentzen
- Debut: 2002 Australian Grand Prix
Races	Wins	Poles	F/Laps
17	0	0	0
- Constructors' Championships: 0
- Drivers' Championships: 0

The Sauber C21 was the car with which the Sauber team competed in the 2002 Formula One World Championship.

== Concept ==
The C21 chassis was an evolution of 2001's successful C20, which had secured Sauber a best-ever fourth place in the Constructors' Championship. It was designed by Technical Manager Willy Rampf and his 24-strong design team. It was therefore similar to the C20, with modifications to the position of the radiators, suspension setup and rear bodywork. The C21 also featured a new gearbox which was more compact and lightweight than its predecessor.

The team continued to use Ferrari engines rebadged in deference to title sponsor Petronas, as had been the case since 1997. Throughout the 2002 season, they used derivatives of the previous year's 051 engine, which had then been used by the Ferrari team in its own F2001 chassis. Although powerful and reliable, the cost of purchasing the year's engine supply was £13 million.

== Developments ==
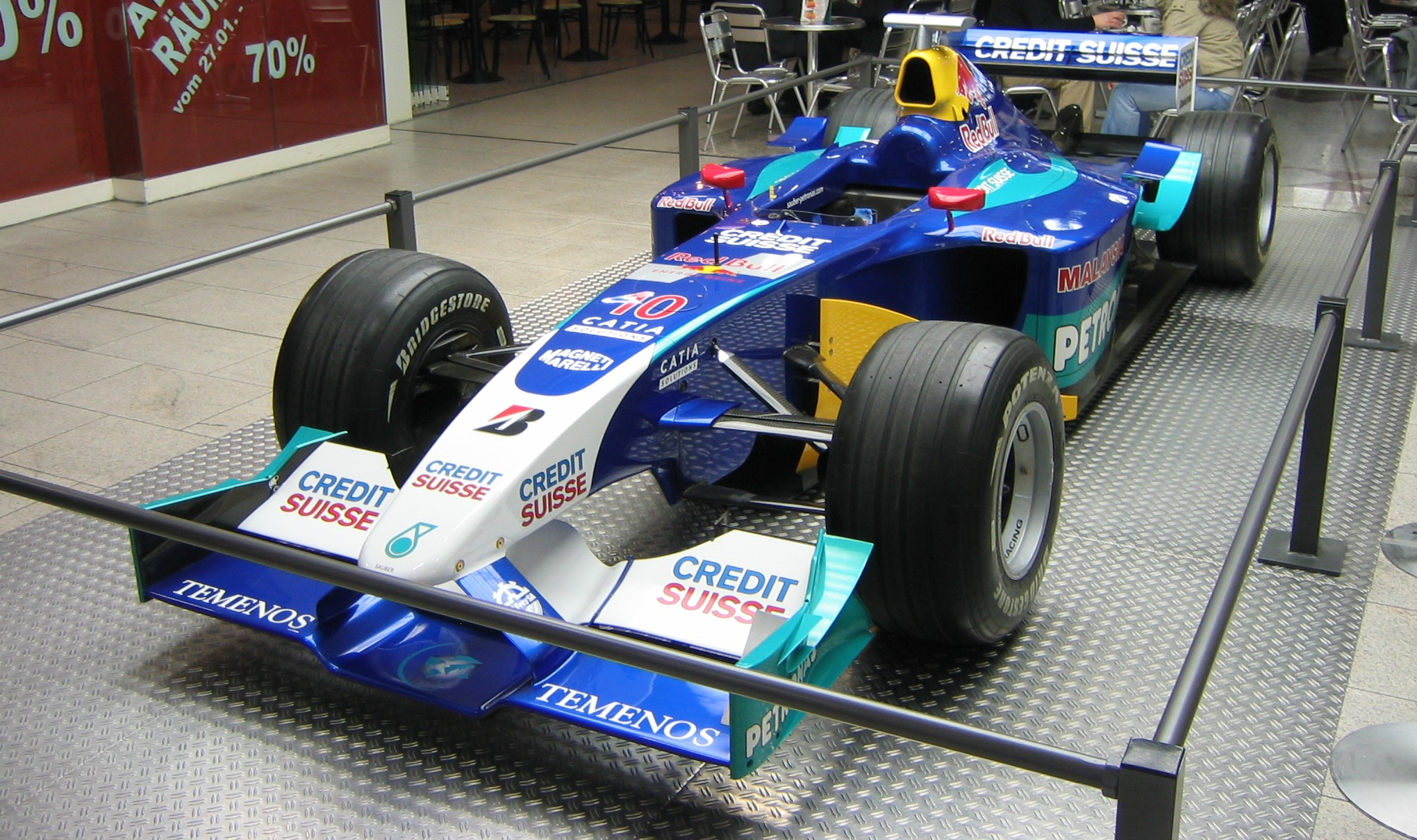
The Sauber C21 with the 2003 livery of the C22 chassis.

There was a steady flow of development upgrades for the C21 throughout 2002. However, the team was not able to match its efforts in 2001, largely due to the absence of an in-house wind tunnel and the diverted effort involved in building one (which would eventually become operational during the 2004 season). Steps forward were made with the C21's aerodynamics, floor, engine cover, front wing and weight reduction, but wind tunnel work ended in August as the team shifted its focus to the following year's C22.

The Ferrari engine was also developed, with two improvements in performance being made during the course of the season, as was the gearbox and traction control system. Despite these improvements, however, the team's form dipped in the latter stages of the year. The team redesigned the front end of the car in time for the Belgian Grand Prix and fitted the car with a more conventional nosecone.

== Racing history ==
The C21 proved quick in the early stages of the year, and Sauber was the fifth fastest team behind Ferrari, Williams, McLaren and Renault. Although both Heidfeld and Massa were eliminated from the Australian Grand Prix in a first corner accident, they took a double-points finish in Malaysia, with Massa scoring in only his second grand prix. A further points haul was won at Barcelona, and single points were taken by Heidfeld at Silverstone and Hockenheim, and by Massa at the Nürburgring.

However, the team could have scored more points if not for technical problems with the C21 and mistakes from the drivers. Heidfeld's brakes failed at Interlagos, and he was delayed by a radio communications problem at Imola and collided heavily with the lapped Takuma Sato's Jordan after losing control under braking at the Austrian Grand Prix. Both he and Massa also suffered electronic problems in Canada which caused them to exceed the pitlane speed limit and incur drive-through penalties as a result.

Massa also retired from several races after driver errors and collisions with other cars, most notably at the Italian Grand Prix. His contact with Pedro de la Rosa's Jaguar earned him the sport's inaugural ten-place grid penalty for the next race at Indianapolis, and Sauber opted to replace him with the highly experienced Heinz-Harald Frentzen for that race, and ultimately the 2003 season as well.

Heidfeld was more consistent, only retiring from three races, but the C21 slipped off the pace in the latter half of the championship, and Sauber did not score any points in the final five grands prix. The slump in performance occurred at Spa, where the drivers could only qualify in 17th and 18th positions. Although the next races were an improvement, the team was still regarded as lucky to a certain extent in keeping its eventual fifth place in the Constructors' Championship with eleven points, ahead of the resurgent Jordan, BAR and Jaguar teams.

== Sponsorship and livery ==
The C21 was turned out in almost exactly the same livery as the C20; a blue, turquoise/teal and white colour scheme derived from sponsors Petronas and Credit Suisse. Red Bull also continued as a sponsor, featuring on the C21's airbox.

A Malaysian flag present on the bargeboard at the Malaysian Grand Prix.

Sauber supported the international campaign against AIDS in the last three races; Italian, United States and Japanese. The barge boards of the cars were painted white and have slogan "Stop AIDS" and the campaign logo on it.

== Complete Formula One results ==
(key) (results in bold indicate pole position)

Year	Team	Engine	Tyres	Drivers	1	2	3	4	5	6	7	8	9	10	11	12	13	14	15	16	17	Points	WCC
2002	Sauber Petronas	Petronas V10*	**B**		AUS	MAL	BRA	SMR	ESP	AUT	MON	CAN	EUR	GBR	FRA	GER	HUN	BEL	ITA	USA	JPN	11	5th
2002	Sauber Petronas	Petronas V10*	**B**	(Germany) Nick Heidfeld	Ret	5	Ret	10	4	Ret	8	12	7	6	7	6	9	10	10	9	7	11	5th
2002	Sauber Petronas	Petronas V10*	**B**	(Brazil) Felipe Massa	Ret	6	Ret	8	5	Ret	Ret	9	6	9	Ret	7	7	Ret	Ret		Ret	11	5th
2002	Sauber Petronas	Petronas V10*	**B**	(Germany) Heinz-Harald Frentzen																13		11	5th

* Denotes Ferrari-built engines, badged as Petronas
