= Sauber C22 =

Formula One racing car

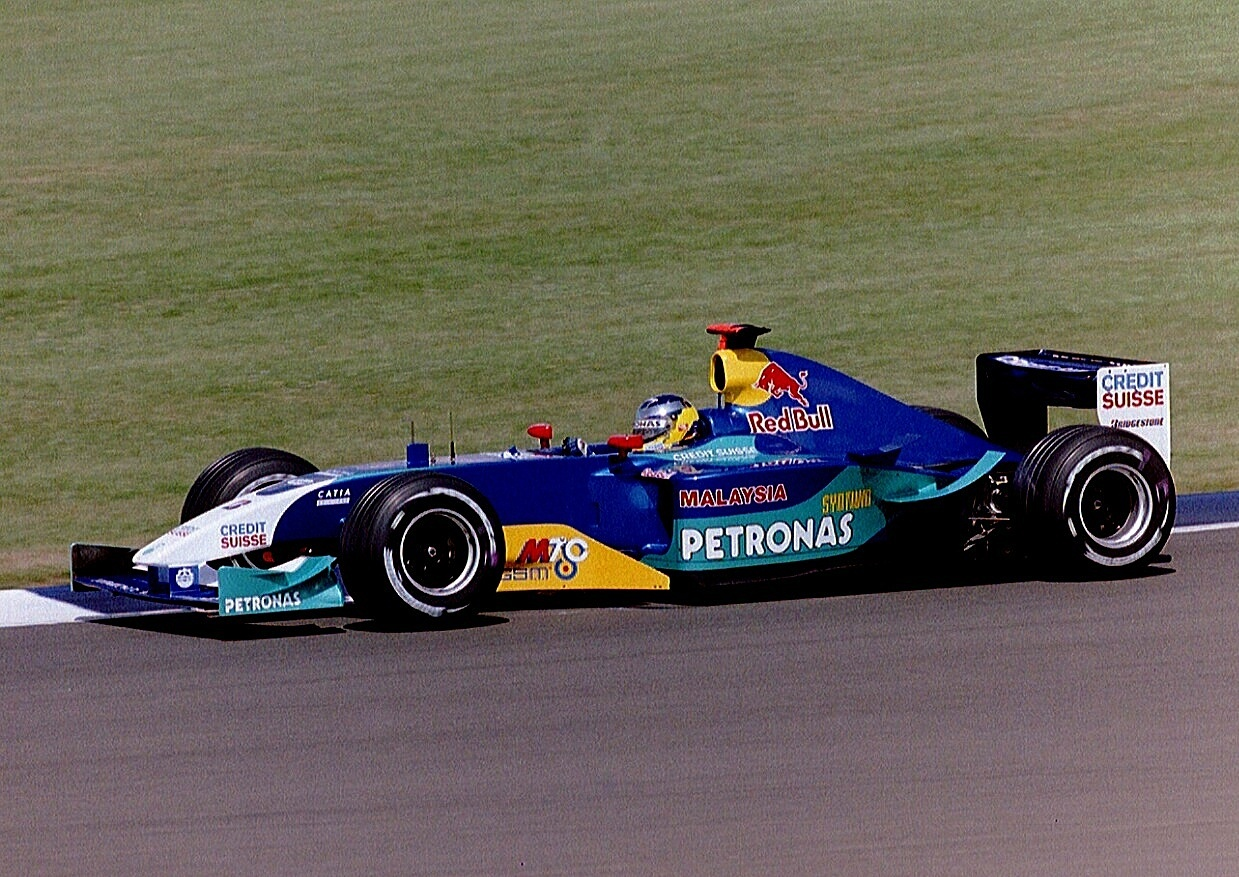
- Nick Heidfeld driving the C22 at the 2003 British Grand Prix
- Category: Formula One
- Constructor: Sauber
- Designers: Willy Rampf (Technical Director); Osamu Goto (Engine Director); Leo Ress (Engineering Director); Christoph Zimmermann (Head of Composite Design); Matt Cranor (Head of Mechanical Design); Ruedi Schorno (Head of Systems Engineering); Seamus Mullarkey (Head of Aerodynamics); Dirk de Beer (Principal Aerodynamicist)
- Predecessor: Sauber C21
- Successor: Sauber C23

Technical specifications
- Chassis: Carbon fibre monocoque
- Suspension (front): Upper and lower wishbones, inboard springs and dampers, actuated by pushrods
- Suspension (rear): As front
- Engine: Petronas 03A (Ferrari Tipo 051/B/C) 3.0 V10 naturally aspirated Mid-engined, longitudianlly mounted
- Transmission: Sauber 7-speed Semi automatic
- Fuel: Petronas
- Tyres: Bridgestone

Competition history
- Notable entrants: Sauber Petronas
- Notable drivers: 9. (Germany) Nick Heidfeld; 10. (Germany) Heinz-Harald Frentzen
- Debut: 2003 Australian Grand Prix
- Last event: 2003 Japanese Grand Prix
Races	Wins	Podiums	Poles	F/Laps
16	0	1	0	0
- Constructors' Championships: 0
- Drivers' Championships: 0

The Sauber C22 was the car with which the Sauber Petronas team competed in the 2003 Formula One World Championship.

The C22 was driven by Nick Heidfeld, now in his third season with Sauber and was paired with experienced former Williams and Jordan Grand Prix driver Heinz-Harald Frentzen, who had deputised for Felipe Massa at the 2002 United States Grand Prix. Massa departed the team to join Ferrari as a test driver. Swiss driver Neel Jani was signed as a test driver for the 2003 season helping develop the C22.

== Overview ==
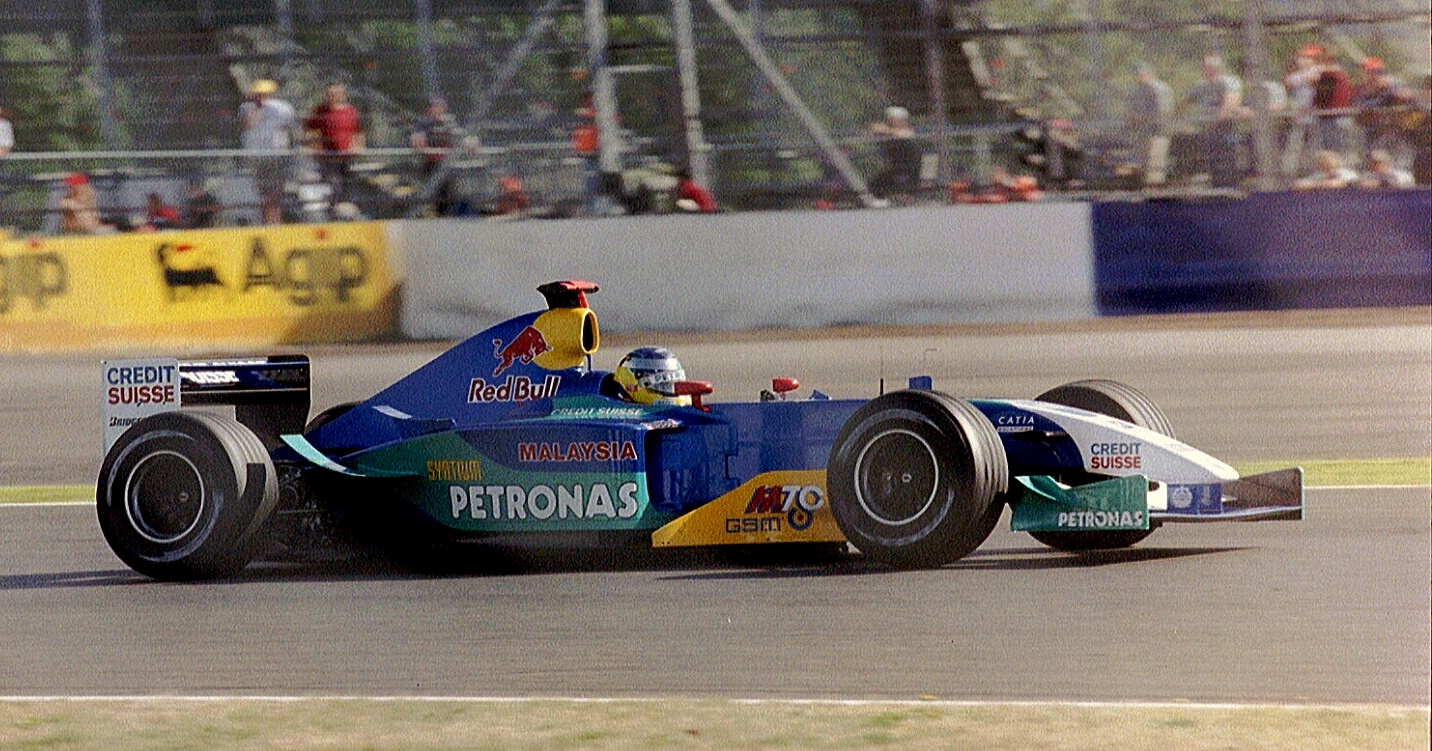
Nick Heidfeld at Silverstone

The C22 was the third car designed by Willy Rampf for the Sauber team. Initial designs for the C22 were completed as early as May 2002. Emphasis was placed on improved rigidity of parts, reliability and making the car more compact and lighter than in 2001. Sauber would continue their relationship with Ferrari providing V10 power units for the team. Badged as the Petronas 03A, the engine was based on the Ferrari works engine from 2002 that had taken Michael Schumacher to the world championship title. Sauber continued utilising Bridgestone tyres for the C22. The C22 was also first Sauber car to utilize bespoke Petronas Primax racing petroleum fuel after six seasons utilizing Shell fuel due to the Ferrari customer partnership.

Testing of the car was due to begin with a shakedown at Fiorano Circuit, in January 2003 ahead of the C22 launch, however due to snowy conditions this was abandoned. The C22 was later launched by Sauber on 9 February, 2003 in Hinwil, Switzerland. The launch was accompanied by an acrobatic ice skating display. The team continued testing through January at Barcelona and later two sessions at Valencia, which was received positively despite a power unit failure and challenging weather conditions. As Sauber did not opt into the 2003 Friday test sessions offered by the FIA in exchange for a limited in season private test model, the development of the C22 continued throughout the season at circuits including Silverstone and Jerez. Neel Jani got his first Formula One drive with the C22, supporting aerodynamic development at a test track near Milan, Italy in April.

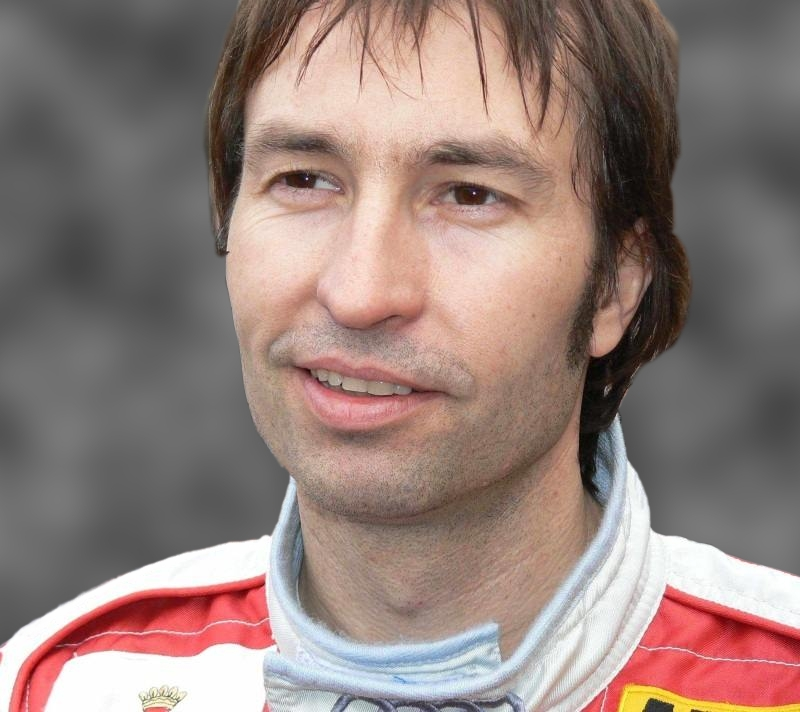
The Sauber C22 took German driver Heinz-Harald Frentzen to his 18th, and final, Formula One podium finish at the 2003 United States Grand Prix

The season started positively for the team and the C22. Frentzen qualified 4th for the 2003 Australian Grand Prix, and would go on to finish in 6th position picking up the first 3 points of the season for Sauber. Further points were scored in Malaysia and Brazil by Heidfeld and Frentzen.

However, as the races progressed unreliability became an issue for the team, as did finishes outside the points. Notably, in Austria, Frentzen could not begin the Grand Prix at all due to a clutch problem. Of the season as a whole, only two retirements were caused by accidents or collisions. One notable accident retirement was at the 2003 Monaco Grand Prix when Frentzen crashed at the swimming pool chicane on Lap 1, officially classified as completing 0 laps.

The season highlight for Sauber and the C22 was the 2003 United States Grand Prix at Indianapolis. It was the first occasion that both cars scored points at the same race, and Frentzen finished third - taking the C22 to its only podium finish. This would also be Frentzen's 18th and final F1 podium.

The C22 finished the season with 19 points, and took Sauber to 6th position in the Constructors standings. The C22 would be the final Formula One car driven by Heinz-Harald Frentzen, who retired from the sport to join then-General Motors-owned Opel in DTM. Meanwhile, Nick Heidfeld would leave the team but would eventually return when it became BMW Sauber in 2006.

== Sponsorship and livery ==
For 2003, Sauber retained lead sponsor Petronas alongside Red Bull. Mobile TeleSystems (MTS) were unveiled as a key sponsor at the launch event in 2003. Credit Suisse, who sponsored the team since 2001, continued their wing branding and announced a renewal for 2004.

A Malaysian flag above the bargeboard at the Malaysian Grand Prix.

== Complete Formula One results ==
(key)

Year	Entrant	Engine	Tyres	Drivers	1	2	3	4	5	6	7	8	9	10	11	12	13	14	15	16	Points	WCC
2003	Sauber Petronas	Petronas V10*	B		AUS	MAL	BRA	SMR	ESP	AUT	MON	CAN	EUR	FRA	GBR	GER	HUN	ITA	USA	JPN	19	6th
2003	Sauber Petronas	Petronas V10*	B	(Germany) Nick Heidfeld	Ret	8	Ret	10	10	Ret	11	Ret	8	13	17	10	9	9	5	9	19	6th
2003	Sauber Petronas	Petronas V10*	B	(Germany) Heinz-Harald Frentzen	6	9	5	11	Ret	DNS	Ret	Ret	9	12	12	Ret	Ret	13^{†}	3	Ret	19	6th

* denotes Ferrari engine badged as Petronas
