= Sauber C23 =

Formula One racing car

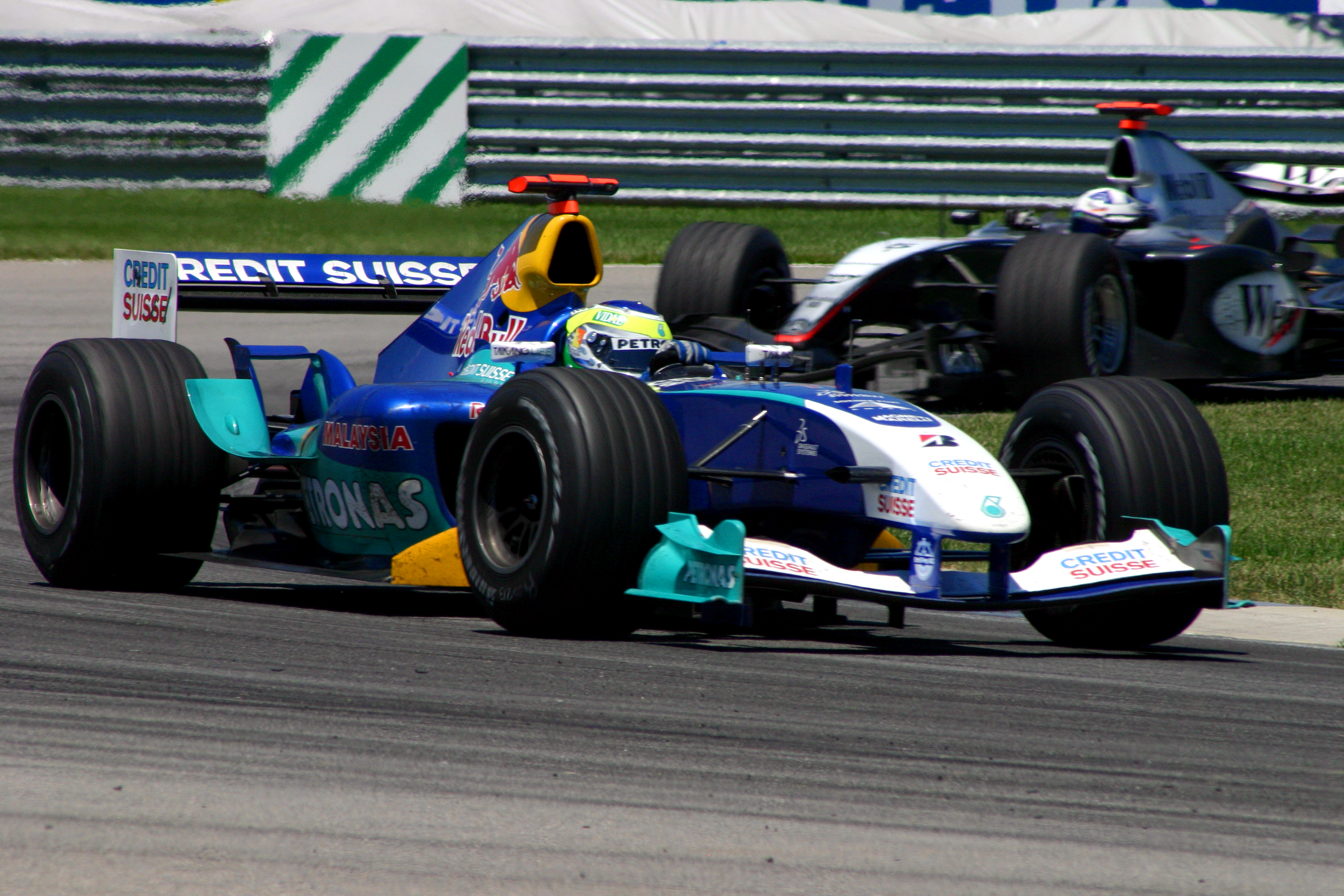
- Giancarlo Fisichella driving the Sauber C23 at the 2004 United States Grand Prix.
- Category: Formula One
- Constructor: Sauber
- Designers: Willy Rampf (Technical Director); Osamu Goto (Engine Director); Jacky Eeckelaert (Engineering Director); Christoph Zimmermann (Head of Composite Design); Matt Cranor (Head of Mechanical Design); Ruedi Schorno (Head of Systems Engineering); Seamus Mullarkey (Head of Aerodynamics); Dirk de Beer (Principal Aerodynamicist)
- Predecessor: Sauber C22
- Successor: Sauber C24

Technical specifications
- Chassis: carbon-fibre monocoque
- Suspension (front): Upper and lower wishbones, inboard springs and dampers actuated by pushrods
- Suspension (rear): Upper and lower wishbones, inboard springs and dampers actuated by pushrods
- Engine: Petronas 04A (Ferrari Tipo 053) 3.0 litre 90 degree V10 naturally aspirated mid-engine, longitudinally mounted
- Transmission: Ferrari 7-speed longitudinally mounted gearbox AP carbon clutch
- Fuel: Petronas Primax
- Lubricants: Petronas Syntium
- Tyres: Bridgestone Potenza (January-October 2004) later Michelin (post-season testings only in November-December 2004)

Competition history
- Notable entrants: Sauber Petronas
- Notable drivers: 11. (Italy) Giancarlo Fisichella; 12. (Brazil) Felipe Massa
- Debut: 2004 Australian Grand Prix
- Last event: 2004 Brazilian Grand Prix
Races	Wins	Poles	F/Laps
18	0	0	0
- Constructors' Championships: 0
- Drivers' Championships: 0

The Sauber C23 was the car with which the Sauber team competed in the 2004 Formula One World Championship.

The car was driven by Italian Giancarlo Fisichella, who joined the team from Jordan, and Brazilian Felipe Massa, who had driven for Sauber in 2002 and returned after spending 2003 testing for Ferrari. Swiss Neel Jani was the team's test driver.

== Overview ==
The car was a direct evolution of the Sauber C22. For this purpose, Ferrari's car from the previous year, the Ferrari F2003-GA, was used as a model. In terms of design, care was taken to make the car lighter and test more than last year's car. For the first time, the Sauber car was equipped with the same Ferrari engine type as Ferrari itself and not, as before, with the respective previous year's engine. The engine was designated the Petronas 04A. The fuel also came from Petronas and the car raced with Bridgestone tyres.

The Sauber C23 was unveiled on January 12 in Salzburg at Hangar-7, Red Bull's owned aircraft hangar, to mark the 10th anniversary of Red Bull's sponsorship.

== Racing history ==
Giancarlo Fisichella scored the most championship points with 22 with a best finish of 4th place at the Canadian Grand Prix while Felipe Massa scored 12 points also with a best finish of 4th place at the Belgian Grand Prix. The team scored 34 points overall and 6th place in the Constructors' Championship.

== Sponsorship and livery ==
Sauber went into 2004 with sponsorship continuity. The livery closely resembles Sauber's previous car, the C22 with the removal of computer software company TEMENOS. This was the last Sauber car featuring sponsorship from Red Bull, before Red Bull's departure to Red Bull Racing in 2005. The following season, Credit Suisse serves as a major sponsor.

A Malaysian flag above the bargeboard at the Malaysian Grand Prix.

== Complete Formula One results ==
(key)

Year	Team	Engine	Tyres	Drivers	1	2	3	4	5	6	7	8	9	10	11	12	13	14	15	16	17	18	Points	WCC
2004	Sauber Petronas	Petronas V10*	B		AUS	MAL	BHR	SMR	ESP	MON	EUR	CAN	USA	FRA	GBR	GER	HUN	BEL	ITA	CHN	JPN	BRA	34	6th
2004	Sauber Petronas	Petronas V10*	B	(Italy) Giancarlo Fisichella	10	11	11	9	7	Ret	6	4	9^{†}	12	6	9	8	5	8	7	8	9	34	6th
2004	Sauber Petronas	Petronas V10*	B	(Brazil) Felipe Massa	Ret	8	12	10	9	5	9	Ret	Ret	13	9	13	Ret	4	12	8	9	8	34	6th

* Denotes Ferrari engine badged as Petronas.
