= 2001 French Grand Prix =

Race 10 of 17 in the 2001 Formula One World Championship
← Previous race	Next race →

Race details
- Date: 1 July 2001
- Official name: Mobil 1 Grand Prix de France 2001
- Location: Circuit de Nevers Magny-Cours, Magny-Cours, Nièvre, Burgundy, France
- Course: Permanent racing facility
- Course length: 4.251 km (2.641 miles)
- Distance: 72 laps, 305.886 km (190.069 miles)
- Weather: Sunny
- Attendance: 120,717

Pole position
Driver	(Germany) Ralf Schumacher	Williams-BMW
- Time: 1:12.989

Fastest lap
Driver	(United Kingdom) David Coulthard	McLaren-Mercedes
- Time: 1:16.088

Podium
First	(Germany) Michael Schumacher	Ferrari
Second	(Germany) Ralf Schumacher	Williams-BMW
Third	(Brazil) Rubens Barrichello	Ferrari

The 2001 French Grand Prix (officially the Mobil 1 Grand Prix de France 2001) was a Formula One motor race held at the Circuit de Nevers Magny-Cours, Magny-Cours, Nièvre, Burgundy, France on 1 July 2001 before a crowd of 120,717 people. It was the 10th race of 17 in the 2001 Formula One World Championship and the 51st French Grand Prix as part of the series. Ferrari driver Michael Schumacher won the 72-lap race starting from second position. Ralf Schumacher finished second for the Williams team with Rubens Barrichello third in the other Ferrari.

Heading into the race, Michael Schumacher led the World Drivers' Championship by 24 championship points over Coulthard and Ferrari led McLaren in the World Constructors' Championship. Ralf Schumacher secured the first pole position of his career by setting the fastest lap time in the one-hour qualifying session. He led the opening 23 laps before he made his first pit stop and Michael Schumacher assumed the lead after the first round of pit stops. McLaren's David Coulthard served a ten-second stop-and-go penalty on lap 32 for an earlier transgression of speeding at the pit lane exit. Michael Schumacher pulled away from the slower car of Ralf Schumacher who baulked his teammate Juan Pablo Montoya, until his second pit stop on the 44th lap. Montoya led laps 46 to 50 before he ceded the lead to Michael Schumacher, who maintained it for the remainder of the race to achieve his sixth victory of the season and the 50th of his career.

The result enabled Michael Schumacher to increase his World Drivers' Championship lead over Coulthard in second to 31 championship points. Ralf Schumacher's second-place finish moved him past Barrichello for third. Although he retired from the event, Montoya kept fifth. Ferrari further extended their World Constructors' Championship advantage to 52 championship points over the McLaren team in second. Williams remained in third place with 43 championship points while Sauber broke its tie with Jordan to move into a clear fourth with seven rounds left in the season.

== Background ==
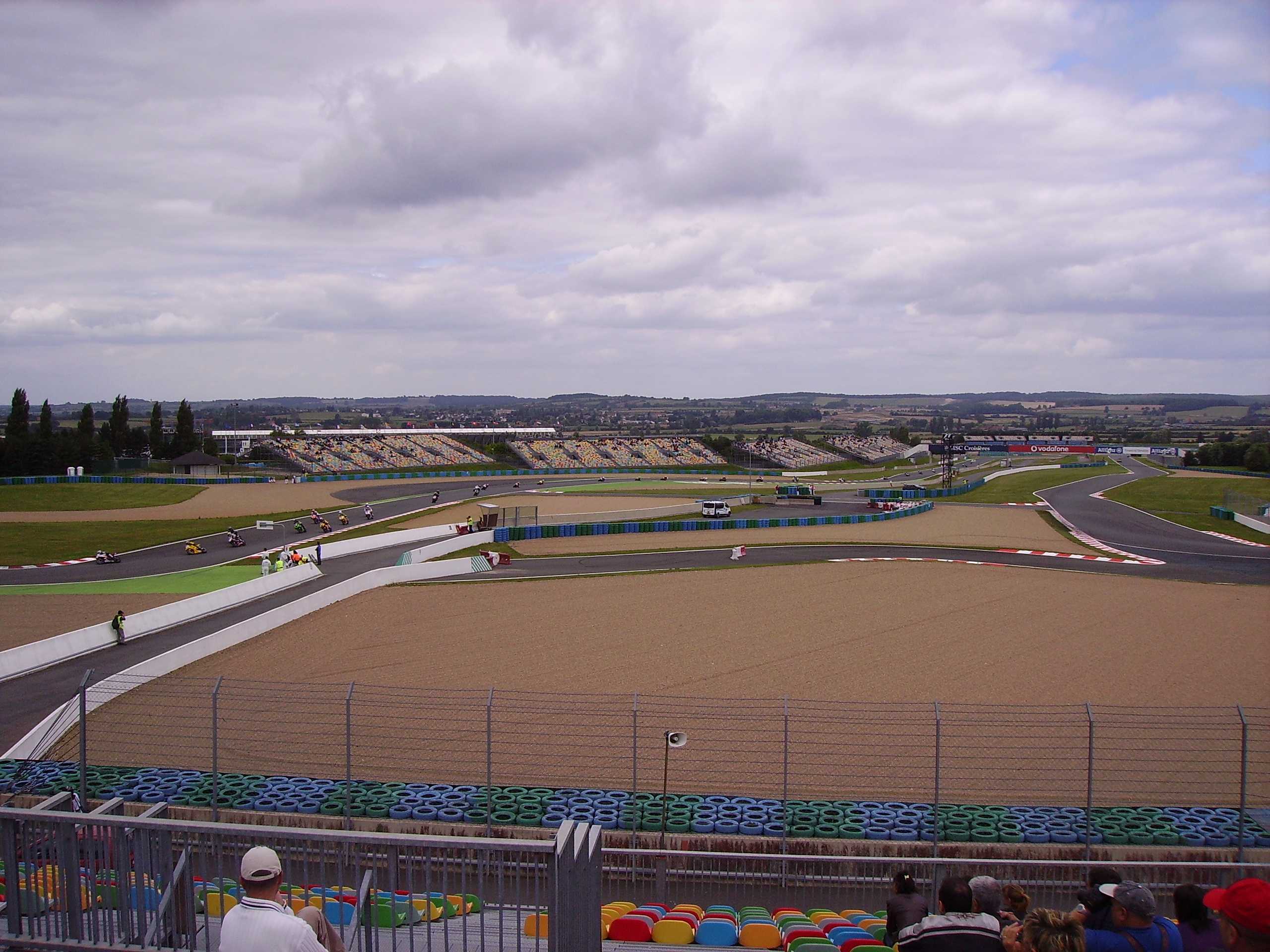
The Circuit de Nevers Magny-Cours (pictured in 2009), where the race was held.

The 2001 French Grand Prix was the 10th of 17 scheduled single seater races of the 2001 Formula One World Championship and the 51st running of the event as part of the series. It took place at the 15-turn 4.251 km (2.641 mi) Circuit de Nevers Magny-Cours in the commune of Magny-Cours, Nièvre, Burgundy on 1 July 2001. The layout of the circuit provided a mixture of corners taken at low and high speeds with four long and short straights. It had a flat and smooth racing surface that had no single deformation around the track to disrupt the stability of the cars and the series' two tyre suppliers Bridgestone and Michelin brought soft compound tyres to maximise mechanical grip.

Before the race, Ferrari driver Michael Schumacher led the World Drivers' Championship with 68 championship points ahead of McLaren's David Coulthard (44 championship points) in second. Rubens Barrichello (26 championship points) in the second Ferrari was third and Williams driver Ralf Schumacher in fourth was one point behind in the battle for the position. The other Williams driver Juan Pablo Montoya completed the top five in the standings with 12 championship points. In the World Constructors' Championship Ferrari led with 94 championship points, with a 41-point gap over the second-placed McLaren. With 37 championship points, Williams were in third position and Sauber (15 championship points) and Jordan (13 championship points) contended for fourth place.

In preparation for the Grand Prix, the Ferrari team tested its chassis, the F2001, the only constructor to do so. The outfit conducted a six-hour and 45-minute shakedown session on 28 June at the Fiorano Circuit with their test driver, Luca Badoer, who drove 45 km (28 mi) to test the functionality of the car electrical system and also concentrated on launch control system practice starts. After an FIA World Motor Sport Council meeting in Paris on 27 June 2001, all of the 11 teams unanimously agreed that starting from this event, any driver who stalled his car on the grid for the formation lap would be barred from using the spare car. The rule was revised to state that any switch into the spare car could only be undertaken 15 seconds before the commencement of the formation lap and it would avoid any driver incurring a pit lane start.

Coulthard had won the 2000 French Grand Prix and spoke of his anticipation that McLaren would be within four-tenths of a second of Ferrari depending on the amount of tyre degradation, "So, in qualifying, again, unless the tyre that we have available to us works well on our car there, I don't think we have something in the set-up that we can change. It's probably something a bit more fundamental." He said that he did not want to be drawn into discussion over the Drivers' Championship and sought to extract his best performance over the rest of the season, " I concentrate on the future because you can't change the past. What we can influence is the future and we won't be affected by the situation that we are in." Michael Schumacher stated his acknowledgement that Coulthard was his main rival for the Drivers' Championship, and took a race-by-race approach, "The year is long and there are still eight races to go and I still have to calculate for David in particular. McLaren could still be very strong in Magny-Cours"

A total of 11 teams (each representing a different constructors) entered two drivers each for the event. Some teams made modifications to their cars for the race. The Renault engine manufacturer débuted a revised specification of its V10 power unit in the Benetton B201s of Giancarlo Fisichella and Jenson Button. This however did not increase the overall top speed of the cars and they remained slow throughout the race meeting. All of the primary teams did not bring any major aerodynamic improvements to the Magny-Cours track as the Prost outfit installed revised its suspension geometry and modified the bodywork of the AP04 chassis. The Sauber team mounted a new front wing on the C20 that featured an V-shaped wing to support it and the British American Racing (BAR) squad introduced a new rear suspension design that was developed by its partner Honda on Olivier Panis' 003 chassis.

== Practice ==
A total of four practice sessions preceded Sunday's race—two one-hour sessions on Thursday, and two 45-minute sessions on Saturday. Ambient and track conditions were hot and clear for the two practice sessions on Friday. In the first practice session, held on a slippery track on Friday morning, McLaren's Mika Häkkinen was fastest with a lap of 1:15.889, 0.155 seconds faster than Michael Schumacher in second. Coulthard and Barrichello were third and fourth, with the Williams of Ralf Schumacher and Montoya fifth and sixth. Jarno Trulli of the Jordan team, Panis, Heinz-Harald Frentzen and BAR driver Jacques Villeneuve rounded out the session's top ten drivers. Several drivers spun on the dusty track and into the gravel traps during the session. Ralf Schumacher's running ended early due to a water leak that was possibly caused by a damaged pipe in the car's sidepod from hitting debris off Kimi Räikkönen's Sauber. Around 15 minutes into the session, Eddie Irvine got his Jaguar stuck in a gravel trap on his first attempt at a fast lap.

Coulthard was quicker in the second practice session held later in the afternoon and recorded the day's fastest lap of 1:14.935 late in the session. Irvine had increased pace in his Jaguar and he went second and Villeneuve was third. Fourth was Häkkinen and the Williams pair of Ralf Schumacher and Montoya placed fifth and sixth. Michael Schumacher, Jaguar's Pedro de la Rosa, Trulli and Barrichello were in positions seven to ten. Jos Verstappen's engine failed in his Arrows A22 on the pit lane straight and he took over his teammate Enrique Bernoldi's Arrows car for the final 20 minutes of the session. An unstable rear caused Panis to spin into the gravel trap at the Adelaide hairpin early in the session. As Räikkönen exited the pit lane, the front wing on his car detached, causing him to oversteer through the gravel trap at Estoril corner at high speed and shattering the front wing.

It continued to be hot and clear for Saturday morning's two practice sessions. Michael Schumacher increased the performance of his car and was fastest in the third practice session with a lap of 1:13.729 he set late in the session. He was 0.406 seconds clear of Coulthard in second and third was Ralf Schumacher. Barrichello was fourth-fastest, ahead of Montoya and Trulli in fifth and sixth places. Frentzen, Panis, Villeneuve and Räikkönen followed in the top ten. No incidents were reported during the session although Häkkinen did not record a timed lap. Although he did not improve his lap time Michael Schumacher remained quickest in the fourth practice session, with Ralf Schumacher in second. The two McLarens were third and fourth – Coulthard ahead of Häkkinen – with Trulli improving to fifth and Barrichello fell to sixth. Montoya was seventh-fastest, Sauber's Nick Heidfeld placed eighth, Irvine came ninth and Räikkönen duplicated his third practice session result in tenth position.

== Qualifying ==
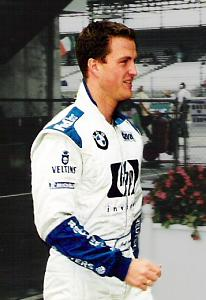
Ralf Schumacher (pictured in 2002), who took the first pole position of his career in his Williams-BMW.

Saturday's afternoon one hour qualifying session saw each driver was limited to twelve laps, with the grid order decided by their fastest laps. During this session, the 107% rule was in effect, which necessitated each driver to set a time within 107 per cent of the quickest lap to qualify for the race. Weather conditions for qualifying were hot and sunny. On his 26th birthday and in his 76th entry, Ralf Schumacher twice surpassed the qualifying track record held by Nigel Mansell, the 1992 World Champion, to claim the first pole position of his career and the Williams team's first since the 1997 European Grand Prix with a 1:12.989 lap that he set on his second timed run. His older brother Michael Schumacher was ten-thousandths of a second slower in second position, and was the early pace setter until Ralf Schumacher's pace. He was distracted by the Ferrari technical director Ross Brawn over the radio and was later baulked by Trulli on his third timed lap. Coulthard qualified third on his fourth timed run with three minutes left and spoke of his feeling he could have improved further as he ran over gravel scattered by Luciano Burti's Prost car at Lycee corner causing him to make a minor mistake. His teammate Häkkinen had minor engine vibrations and an error on his final timed lap put him fourth. Trulli and Frentzen took fifth and seventh for the Jordan team. Trulli set his best lap late in the session, and was pleased with the balance of his car and later apologised to Michael Schumacher for slowing the Ferrari driver while Frentzen was baulked by Panis. They were separated by Montoya's slower Williams who was pleased with how his car felt but was annoyed with Alesi who blocked Montoya during his last timed lap towards its conclusion. Montoya drove on the harder, slower tyre compound.

A handling balance problem that made his car anxious under braking, locked up under braking and launched over the kerbs at the turn 13/14 chicane restricted Barrichello to eighth, with his best time set on his last run. His Ferrari was undamaged. Heidfeld made minor adjustments to improve the vehicle's balance and took ninth. Villeneuve used the first half an hour to adjust his front and rear flaps and took tenth, although he lost time through turn one. Panis took 11th after heavy traffic slowed his final timed lap. Irvine, 12th, spun twice during the session and returned to the garage to switch to the spare Jaguar to set his quickest lap time. Räikkönen in 13th expressed disappointment of the balance of his car. 14th-placed De la Rosa was kept from the circuit due to an electrical fault at his part of the garage and engine overheating and driver errors affected his on-track running. Burti's car was altered at midday and pirouetted his car on his third timed lap as he qualified 15th. Fisichella and Button of the Benetton outfit took 16th and 17th: Button was prevented from setting a faster lap because he forgot to change the setting of his differential exiting Estroil corner because he was too focused on the lap and he only remembered to alter the differential setting when he got to the Adelaide hairpin. Verstappen in 18th could not adapt the Arrows A22 to the track and he was ahead of 19th-placed Alesi spun at high-speed leaving the Imola chicane. Bernoldi was unable to extract additional speed from his car and took 20th. The two Minardi drivers qualified at the rear of the field in 21st and 22nd places: Fernando Alonso was slowed on his final timed lap by Bernoldi, and his teammate Tarso Marques had a large amount of understeer that affected the handling of his chassis, which could not be rectified.

=== Post-qualifying ===
At the pre-race drivers meeting on Saturday evening, the drivers deliberated the best method to avoid potential crashes at the exit of the pit lane, which was changed at the request of all drivers for the 2001 race, from the exit of the Estoril turn to its entry.

=== Qualifying classification ===
Pos	No.	Driver	Constructor	Lap	Gap	Grid
1	5	(Germany) Ralf Schumacher	Williams-BMW	1:12.989	—	1
2	1	(Germany) Michael Schumacher	Ferrari	1:12.999	+0.010	2
3	4	(United Kingdom) David Coulthard	McLaren-Mercedes	1:13.186	+0.197	3
4	3	(Finland) Mika Häkkinen	McLaren-Mercedes	1:13.268	+0.279	4
5	12	(Italy) Jarno Trulli	Jordan-Honda	1:13.310	+0.321	5
6	6	(Colombia) Juan Pablo Montoya	Williams-BMW	1:13.625	+0.636	6
7	11	(Germany) Heinz-Harald Frentzen	Jordan-Honda	1:13.815	+0.826	7
8	2	(Brazil) Rubens Barrichello	Ferrari	1:13.867	+0.878	8
9	16	(Germany) Nick Heidfeld	Sauber-Petronas	1:14.095	+1.106	9
10	10	(Canada) Jacques Villeneuve	BAR-Honda	1:14.096	+1.107	10
11	9	(France) Olivier Panis	BAR-Honda	1:14.181	+1.192	11
12	18	(United Kingdom) Eddie Irvine	Jaguar-Cosworth	1:14.441	+1.452	12
13	17	(Finland) Kimi Räikkönen	Sauber-Petronas	1:14.536	+1.547	13
14	19	(Spain) Pedro de la Rosa	Jaguar-Cosworth	1:15.020	+2.031	14
15	23	(Brazil) Luciano Burti	Prost-Acer	1:15.072	+2.083	15
16	7	(Italy) Giancarlo Fisichella	Benetton-Renault	1:15.220	+2.231	16
17	8	(United Kingdom) Jenson Button	Benetton-Renault	1:15.420	+2.431	17
18	14	(Netherlands) Jos Verstappen	Arrows-Asiatech	1:15.707	+2.718	18
19	22	(France) Jean Alesi	Prost-Acer	1:15.774	+2.785	19
20	15	(Brazil) Enrique Bernoldi	Arrows-Asiatech	1:15.828	+2.839	20
21	21	(Spain) Fernando Alonso	Minardi-European	1:16.039	+3.050	21
22	20	(Brazil) Tarso Marques	Minardi-European	1:16.500	+3.511	22
107% time: 1:18.098

== Warm-up ==
On race morning, a 30-minute warm-up session was held in warm and dry weather conditions. All drivers fine-tuned their race set-ups against the weather conditions of the time, set laps in their spare cars and Barrichello changed the setting of his rear wing. Although he spun towards the conclusion of the session, Häkkinen drove better than in qualifying and he was fastest with a lap of 1:15.428, which was one-thousands of a second faster than Michael Schumacher in second. Barrichello's car was corrected from having an unbalanced car with a change of electronic settings after a technical meeting and he placed third and Coulthard was fourth. Fifth was Trulli, Räikkönen placed sixth and Panis came seventh. De la Rosa, Heidfeld and Irvine were in positions eight to ten.

== Race ==
The race took place in the afternoon from 14:00 local time. Weather conditions at the start were hot and clear. The air temperature ranged between 25 and 29 °C (77 and 84 °F) and the track temperature was from 40 to 51 °C (104 to 124 °F). The hot weather increased the possibility of mechanical attrition. Approximately 120,717 people attended the event. According to Adam Cooper of Autosport, a two-stop strategy was the standard for the French Grand Prix and every pit stop took less time because of pit lane layout. Häkkinen could not get off the grid at the start of the formation lap because an assembled component in his car's gearbox was incorrectly fitted. His car was pushed back into the pit lane where the mechanics were unable to rectify the problem and Häkkinen did not take the start. De la Rosa's throttle failed during the formation lap and drove back to the pit lane and started one lap behind the rest of the field. When the five red lights extinguished to signal the start of the race, Ralf Schumacher made a brisk start to maintain his pole position advantage going into the first corner and retained despite an error at the Adelaide hairpin. Michael Schumacher in second was slower off the line due to a minor glitch between the launch control system and clutch that was changed after the warm-up session though he held off Coultard on the first lap.

Barrichello had a fast gateway, rising from eighth to fifth by the end of the first lap. Räikkönen moved up four positions over the same distance. Montoya passed Trulli and the manoeuvre caused the latter to lose momentum and allow Barrichello to overtake him. At the end of the first lap, Ralf Schumacher led by 0.3 seconds from Michael Schumacher, who was in turn was followed by Coulthard, Montoya, Barrichello and Trulli. Ralf Schumacher extended his advantage to three-tenths of a second from Michael Schumacher with Coulthard close behind. Further down the field Panis passed Irvine to take over 11th position, while Fisichella was overtaken by teammate Button for 16th. Villeneuve in eighth became the Grand Prix's first retirement when his engine lost power due to an electrical fault and he went into the gravel trap at Estroil corner on lap six. At the front of the field, Ralf Schumacher, driving with an unbalanced car that caused him to lock his tyres into the Adelaide hairpin, increased his lead over Michael Schumacher to 1.8 seconds by the 17th lap, who in turn, was 1.7 seconds in front of Coulthard in third. Montoya was a further 1.7 seconds adrift in fourth and he maintained a consistent gap ahead of Barrichello in fifth.

That lap, Bernoldi retired with an engine failure. Irvine was challenging Panis for ninth though he was not able to pass and he fell back slightly before the first round of pit stops. In the meantime, the top five drivers were covered by a gap of ten seconds as all of them lapped in the 1 minute and 16 second range and began to lap slower drivers for the first time. Barrichello was the first lead driver to make a pit stop on the 21st lap. He rejoined the track in seventh place.That lap, Irvine overtook Panis around the inside at Lycee corner for ninth. Three laps later, Ralf Schumacher made his first pit stop from the lead. His crew had trouble fitting the car's right-rear tyre because Ralf Schumacher engaged first gear before the mechanic fitted it. He lost 2.8 seconds and returned to the circuit in fourth, the stop having taken 10. 3 seconds. Ralf Schumacher discovered that his second set of tyres did not perform as well as his first set, struggling for grip. Michael Schumacher led the 26th lap and increased his pace before his own stop for fuel, which took 7.7 seconds. He emerged in third, ahead of Ralf Schumacher but behind Coulthard and Montoya. Montoya led the next three laps as Michael Schumacher began to draw closer to him. On lap 30, Montoya made his first pit stop and he rejoined the track in fifth place.

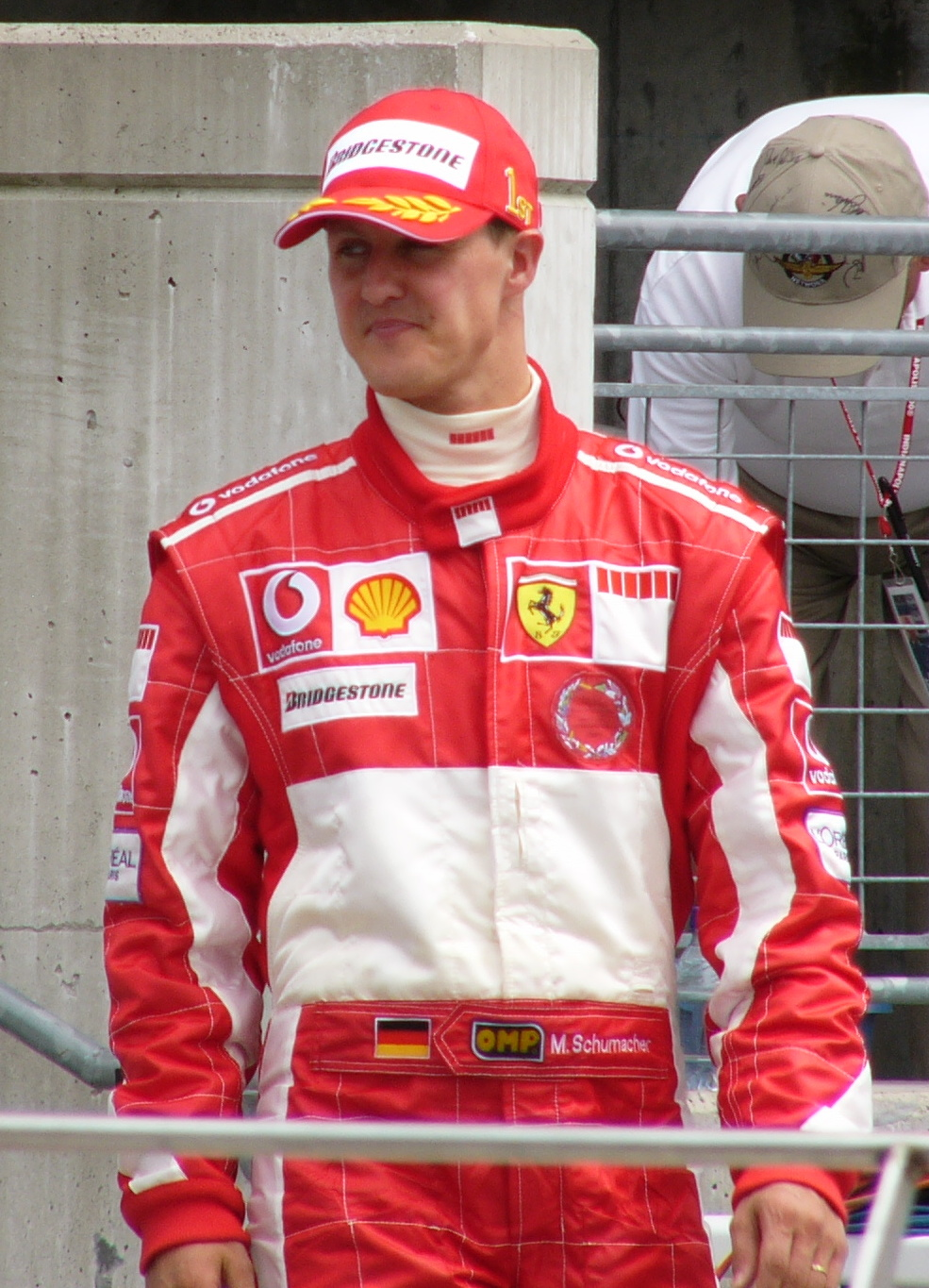
Michael Schumacher (pictured in 2005) won his sixth victory of the season and the 50th of his career.

After the pit stops, Michael Schumacher led Ralf Schumacher by 7.2 seconds, who in turn, was 1.1 seconds ahead of the third-placed Coulthard. Barrichello was another two seconds behind in fourth and the rest of the top six was completed by Montoya and Trulli. On lap 31, the stewards informed the McLaren team that Coulthard had incurred a ten-second stop-and-go penalty because he was observed going 5 km/h (3.1 mph) above the 80 km/h (50 mph) pit lane speed limit because he unintentionally disengaged his pit lane speed limiter that regulates engine speed before crossing the white line denoting the pit lane exit. He took the penalty on the following lap. Coulthard lost 26.8 seconds and he fell from third to fifth. On lap 35, Verstappen passed Alonso to move into 16th. Barrichello made his second pit stop one lap later in Ferrari's aim to get him in clean air and move past Ralf Schumacher after Brawn switched him from a two-stop to three-stop strategy mid-way through the race. He returned in fourth place. As Michael Schumacher continued to pull away from Ralf Schumacher, it became apparent that the latter was delaying his teammate Montoya. The Williams team attempted to order Ralf Schumacher to cede second place to Montoya though he did not do so because of radio communication problems with his earpiece and Montoya lost time.

At the end of lap 42, Irvine drew to the right of Frentzen and out-braked him at the Imola chicane as Frentzen cut the corner to retain eighth. Irvine gesticulated at the Jaguar gantry on the pit lane to signal that Frentzen performed an illegal manoeuvre. Frentzen then ceded the position to Irvine to avoid incurring a penalty. On lap 44, the technical director of the Williams team Patrick Head went to his outfit's gantry on the pit wall to instruct Ralf Schumacher to enter the pit lane earlier than scheduled because of the poor performance of his tyres. Michael Schumacher made his second pit stop for tyres on the next lap and rejoined the circuit in second place, three seconds behind Montoya, who assumed the lead. Montoya increased his pace to hold a five-second advantage when he entered the pit lane for his second scheduled stop on the 50th lap. He emerged in fourth position, ahead of Ralf Schumacher as Michael Schumacher returned to the lead. Montoya pulled off to the side of the track with smoke bellowing from his engine due to a loss of power on lap 53, ending his race prematurely despite the Williams team guiding him through a button-pushing sequence. Barrichello entered the pit lane for his third and final stop on the next lap. It took 7.7 seconds and he emerged in third position. On lap 56, Irvine stopped on the grass at the right-hand side of the Adelaide hairpin with a pneumatic valve system failure.

Coulthard drew close to Barrichello at the Adelaide hairpin on lap 58 after the latter ran wide. He dropped back from Barrichello through Estroil corner three laps later. Button pirouetted through 720 degrees into the gravel trap at the Adelaide hairpin because he pushed too hard and had oversteer on the 63rd lap though he continued. He consequently had too deal with heavy vibrations at high speeds from flat-spotting a tyre after locking the wheels for a long period of time under braking. Further down the field, De la Rosa overtook Alonso for 15th position, and Alonso was called into the pit lane to retire with suspected engine problems located on the Minardi telemetry equipment. On lap 68, Coulthard to pass Barrichello on the left-hand side of the track on the run to the Adelaide hairpin while the two lapped Alesi's slower car though he could not complete the manoeuvre as Barrichello accelerated faster than him at the corner. On lap 71, an oversteer and a rear tyre lock sent Button into a spin through 180 degrees into a gravel trap and retired with a fuel pressure pick-up problem.

At the front, Michael Schumacher was told over the radio to reduce his pace to avoid excessive strain on his car, and he maintained the lead for the rest of the race to achieve his sixth victory of the season out of the ten races held thus far and the 50th of his career, moving him within one of Alain Prost's all-time wins record of 51. Ralf Schumacher was 10.399 seconds behind in second and Barrichello completed the podium finishers in third. Off the podium, Coulthard finished fourth, 0.7 seconds behind Barrichello, having been close enough to challenge but not fast enough to pass. Trulli was fifth and the final driver on the lead lap. Heidfeld completed the points-scoring positions in sixth. Räikkönen came in seventh. Frentzen lost time at a pit stop due to a fuel nozzle issue and finished eighth, Panis was ninth with Burti tenth. Fisichella had a vibration in the suspension from contact with Verstappen but finished 11th. Alesi took 12th. Verstappen suffered a fuel rig failure at his first pit stop and was 13th. De la Rosa placed 14th and Marques had gear selection issues and was the final finisher.

=== Post-race ===
The top three drivers appeared on the podium to collect their trophies and spoke to the media in a later press conference. Ferrari team member Carlo Cantoni appeared on the podium to receive the winning manufacturer's award. Michael Schumacher said he was delighted to take the 50th victory of his career though he explained his priority was to win the race and focus on securing the Drivers' Championship, "People seem to misunderstand my feeling about these statistics – I always said they were second priority but they do mean something to me." Ralf Schumacher expressed his happiness to finish second after his pit stop fumble, "If I would have come out in front of Michael I think it would have been difficult to hold him behind me. I am actually happy to sit here in second today because it was a disaster and really difficult to drive." Barrichello expressed his surprise over finishing in third place, " Qualifying was horrible for me, I never really knew what was going on. The car was oversteering in some places, understeering in other places. This morning the car felt a lot better and I was going really well on my first stint, saving a lot of fuel at that time, and Ross came on the radio and said 'would you like to try a three stop' and I said 'I think so, it's a good idea, because then I can be quick on the track the whole time and by doing stops I might only finish in front of the Jordans, so let's try.'"

Coulthard learned about his ten-second stop-and-go penalty over the radio and admitted his surprise and disappointment over incurring it as he believed he had exited the pit lane, "The fact is the penalty for speeding cost me points. I was just a bit too keen with the button. It has cost me dearly", and, "I knew I had a penalty, at first I didn't know what for. Then the team explained it to me. I wasn't gutted because you never know what can happen during the rest of the race. I knew I had to keep pushing." Häkkinen said he felt nothing about failing to start the race, "If I'd led the race and then retired, there would have been something to feel. But as it is, there is nothing. I know how to win races and am certain I will again in the future." According to Trulli, who finished in fifth, the Jordan team required additional work to increase the EJ11's pace, "I knew that today was going to be a good chance to score points and I kept pushing hard. The car felt perfect from the beginning and the lap times were good but it is difficult to keep close to the three top teams."

The result enabled Michael Schumacher (on 78 championship points) to increase his World Drivers' Championship lead over Coulthard in second to 31 championship points. Ralf Schumacher's second-place finish moved him past Barrichello for third. Montoya remained in fifth place despite his retirement. Ferrari further extended its advantage in the World Constructors' Championship to 52 championship points over the McLaren team in second. Williams remained in third place with 43 championship points while Heidfeld's sixth-place finish allowed Sauber to break its tie with Jordan to move into a clear fourth position with seven rounds left in the season.

=== Race classification ===
Drivers who scored championship points are denoted in bold.

Pos	No.	Driver	Constructor	Tyre	Laps	Time/Retired	Grid	Points
1	1	(Germany) **Michael Schumacher**	**Ferrari**	B	72	1:33:35.636	2	10
2	5	(Germany) **Ralf Schumacher**	**Williams-BMW**	M	72	+ 10.399	1	6
3	2	(Brazil) **Rubens Barrichello**	**Ferrari**	B	72	+ 16.381	8	4
4	4	(United Kingdom) **David Coulthard**	**McLaren-Mercedes**	B	72	+ 17.106	3	3
5	12	(Italy) **Jarno Trulli**	**Jordan-Honda**	B	72	+ 1:08.285	5	2
6	16	(Germany) **Nick Heidfeld**	**Sauber-Petronas**	B	71	+ 1 lap	9	1
7	17	(Finland) Kimi Räikkönen	Sauber-Petronas	B	71	+ 1 lap	13	
8	11	(Germany) Heinz-Harald Frentzen	Jordan-Honda	B	71	+ 1 lap	7	
9	9	(France) Olivier Panis	BAR-Honda	B	71	+ 1 lap	11	
10	23	(Brazil) Luciano Burti	Prost-Acer	M	71	+ 1 lap	15	
11	7	(Italy) Giancarlo Fisichella	Benetton-Renault	M	71	+ 1 lap	16	
12	22	(France) Jean Alesi	Prost-Acer	M	70	+ 2 laps	19	
13	14	(Netherlands) Jos Verstappen	Arrows-Asiatech	B	70	+ 2 laps	18	
14	19	(Spain) Pedro de la Rosa	Jaguar-Cosworth	M	70	+ 2 laps	PL^{1}	
15	20	(Brazil) Tarso Marques	Minardi-European	M	69	+ 3 laps	22	
16	8	(United Kingdom) Jenson Button	Benetton-Renault	M	68	Fuel pressure	17	
17	21	(Spain) Fernando Alonso	Minardi-European	M	65	Engine	21	
Ret	18	(United Kingdom) Eddie Irvine	Jaguar-Cosworth	M	54	Engine	12	
Ret	6	(Colombia) Juan Pablo Montoya	Williams-BMW	M	52	Engine	6	
Ret	15	(Brazil) Enrique Bernoldi	Arrows-Asiatech	B	17	Engine	20	
Ret	10	(Canada) Jacques Villeneuve	BAR-Honda	B	5	Engine	10	
DNS	3	(Finland) Mika Häkkinen	McLaren-Mercedes	B	–	Gearbox	4	

Notes

- **^1** – Pedro de la Rosa started the race from the pit lane.

== Championship standings after the race ==
Drivers' Championship standings

+/–	Pos	Driver	Points
	1	(Germany) Michael Schumacher	78
	2	(United Kingdom) David Coulthard	47
1	3	(Germany) Ralf Schumacher	31
1	4	(Brazil) Rubens Barrichello	30
	5	(Colombia) Juan Pablo Montoya	12

Constructors' Championship standings

+/–	Pos	Constructor	Points
	1	(Italy) Ferrari	108
	2	(United Kingdom) McLaren-Mercedes	56
	3	(United Kingdom) Williams-BMW	43
	4	(Switzerland) Sauber-Petronas	16
	5	(Republic of Ireland) Jordan-Honda	15
Sources:

- Note: Only the top five positions are included for both sets of standings.

Previous race: 2001 European Grand Prix	FIA Formula One World Championship; 2001 season	Next race: 2001 British Grand Prix
Previous race: 2000 French Grand Prix	French Grand Prix	Next race: 2002 French Grand Prix
