= 2001 European Grand Prix =

Race 9 of 17 in the 2001 Formula One World Championship
← Previous race	Next race →
- The Nürburgring (last modified in 1995)

Race details
- Date: 24 June 2001
- Official name: 2001 Warsteiner Grand Prix of Europe
- Location: Nürburgring, Nürburg, Rhineland-Palatinate, Germany
- Course: Permanent racing facility
- Course length: 4.556 km (3.199 miles)
- Distance: 67 laps, 305.252 km (189.675 miles)
- Weather: Sunny, mild, dry, Air Temp: 21°C

Pole position
Driver	(Germany) Michael Schumacher	Ferrari
- Time: 1:14.960

Fastest lap
Driver	(Colombia) Juan Pablo Montoya	Williams-BMW
- Time: 1:18.354 on lap 27

Podium
First	(Germany) Michael Schumacher	Ferrari
Second	(Colombia) Juan Pablo Montoya	Williams-BMW
Third	(United Kingdom) David Coulthard	McLaren-Mercedes

The 2001 European Grand Prix (formally the 2001 Warsteiner Grand Prix of Europe) was a Formula One motor race held on 24 June 2001 at the Nürburgring, Nürburg, Rhineland-Palatinate, Germany. It was the ninth race of the 2001 Formula One World Championship and the sixth European Grand Prix at the Nürburgring. It was also the last race on this layout until the track was modified in 2002. Ferrari driver Michael Schumacher won the 67-lap race from pole position. Williams's Juan Pablo Montoya finished second and McLaren's David Coulthard was third.

Going into the race, Michael Schumacher led the World Drivers' Championship by 18 championship points over Coulthard and Ferrari led McLaren in the World Constructors' Championship. Michael Schumacher took pole position after setting the quickest lap in the one-hour qualifying session. He led for most of the race, despite being pushed by his brother Ralf Schumacher, until the Williams driver was penalised for crossing the white line at the pit lane exit following his first pit stop on lap 28. Michael Schumacher finished 4.1 seconds ahead of Montoya for his fifth victory of the season and 49th of his career.

Michael Schumacher's victory increased his World Drivers' Championship lead to 24 championship points over Coulthard and 42 ahead of Ferrari teammate Rubens Barrichello. With eight races left in the season, Ferrari maintained their World Constructors' Championship lead, 41 championship points ahead of McLaren and 57 ahead of Williams.

== Background ==
The 2001 European Grand Prix was the ninth of seventeen Formula One races in the 2001 Formula One World Championship, held on 24 June 2001, at the 4.556 km (2.831 mi) clockwise Nürburgring, Nürburg, Rhineland-Palatinate, Germany; the circuit hosted the European Grand Prix for the sixth time since its return in 1995. It was one of two Grands Prix to be held in Germany preceding the German Grand Prix by a month. The Nürburgring's 4.556 km (2.831 mi) layout was used for the final time; it was made 0.592 km (0.368 mi) longer beginning in 2002.

Before the event, Ferrari driver Michael Schumacher led the World Drivers' Championship with 58 championship points; McLaren driver David Coulthard was second on 40 championship points. Schumacher's teammate Rubens Barrichello was third with 24 championship points, with Williams's Ralf Schumacher and Coulthard's teammate Mika Häkkinen on 22 and 8 championship points respectively. Ferrari led the World Constructors' Championship on 82 championship points and McLaren were second on 48 championship points, with Williams third on 28 championship points. Sauber were fourth with 15 championship points while Jordan were fifth with 13 championship points.

Following the Canadian Grand Prix on 10 June, the teams tested car setups, components and tyres at the Silverstone Circuit in Northamptonshire from 12 to 14 June to prepare for the European and British Grands Prix. Jaguar's Eddie Irvine and Sauber's Nick Heidfeld withdrew from testing because of a neck pain and a minor headache. Jarno Trulli (Jordan) and British American Racing's (BAR) Olivier Panis led the first two days. Alexander Wurz, McLaren's test driver, was fastest on the final day, more than six-tenths of a second faster than Häkkinen. Minardi cancelled a two-day test at Italy's Fiorano Circuit to investigate a driveshaft problem with their car. Ferrari's test driver, Luca Badoer, evaluated electronic controls and engine plans in Fiorano before shaking down three cars for the European Grand Prix.

With 90 championship points available in the next nine Grands Prix, pundits speculated that McLaren may use team orders to favour Coulthard over teammate Häkkinen in the championship race. Coulthard said he was focused on winning races while Häkkinen stated McLaren expected him to win but acknowledged the complexity of the situation. Häkkinen had scored eight championship points in the opening eight races and rejected suggestions that he should support Coulthard's championship bid. Michael Schumacher was the favourite to win the race, having won four of the previous eight Grands Prix. Despite this, he expressed caution about winning a fourth world title, believing his 18-point lead over Coulthard was insufficient to give him confidence given the large number of championship points still available. Williams's Juan Pablo Montoya had finished only one race across the season and hoped to score championship points in Germany.

The event featured eleven teams (each representing a different constructor) with two drivers each, with one change from the season entry list. Having missed the previous event due to a concussion, a headache and dizziness resulting from a crash during Friday practice for the Canadian Grand Prix, Jordan driver Heinz-Harald Frentzen was declared fit to race by the Fédération Internationale de l'Automobile's (FIA) Medical Delegate Sid Watkins and returned to his seat taken over by temporary replacement Ricardo Zonta, the team's test driver. Zonta was on standby to replace Frentzen if required. Similarly, Irvine recovered from his injured neck, and Heidfeld was suffering from migraines and disorientation after an accident in Canada; both were passed fit to race.

Few teams made significant technical improvements to their cars for the race. Ferrari, McLaren and Williams each installed the same rear wings onto their cars as did at the Monaco Grand Prix, while Williams added new aerodynamic side appendages in front of the air intakes, which necessitated the installation of rubber coverings on the outer edges to protect mechanics when the car were parked. BAR introduced a redesigned front suspension and a new nose with lower-section aerodynamic appendages. During Friday practice, Benetton tried a launch control system on both of their cars to provide for a smoother and quicker start. Jaguar fitted its Monaco-specification front wing and curved sidepod winglets onto its R2 cars. Sauber revised their front wing endplates only for the day before the race and Minardi modified Tarso Marques's pedals for his large feet. Arrows and Prost introduced no new major changes to their cars.

== Practice ==
The race was preceded by four practice sessions, two one-hour sessions on Friday and two 45-minute sessions on Saturday. The first practice on Friday morning was overcast with cold ambient and track conditions. The circuit was dirty, forcing some drivers to lose control and run into the gravel trap. Coulthard posted the fastest lap time of 1:16.888 late in the session, one-tenth of a second faster than teammate Häkkinen. The Ferrari duo of Michael Schumacher and Barrichello, Trulli, Sauber's Kimi Räikkönen, the BAR duo of Panis and Jacques Villeneuve, Heidfeld and Ralf Schumacher followed in the top ten. Irvine's Jaguar had a fuel pump failure, causing it to lose fuel pressure on his out-lap; this forced him to stop at the side of the track and was prevented from setting a lap.

Lap times decreased during the second practice session due to the bright weather, which raised the track and ambient temperatures. Häkkinen set the day's quickest lap, a 1:16.408; Coulthard was second-fastest. The Williams drivers were running quicker—Ralf Schumacher in third and Montoya in sixth—they were separated by the Ferrari duo of Michael Schumacher and Barrichello, in fourth and fifth respectively. They were ahead of Trulli, Heidfeld, Prost's Jean Alesi and Panis in positions seven to ten. Some drivers went off the track during the session. Luciano Burti's Prost stopped on track with an engine failure after ten minutes. After 15 minutes, a throttle problem caused Barrichello to slow down and do a slow lap to the pit lane.

Despite the patchy clouds overhead, the third practice session was held in sunny weather. Michael Schumacher set the session's fastest time with a lap of 1:16.308, almost three-tenths of a second faster than Ralf Schumacher. The McLaren drivers ran slower—Häkkinen ahead of Coulthard. Barrichello, Montoya, Villeneuve (who spun into the gravel at turn five with ten minutes remaining), Frentzen, Panis and Heidfeld occupied positions five to ten.

It continued to be sunny for the final practice session, and although more cars left the track, there were no collisions. Ralf Schumacher was fastest at 1:15.355 in the final minute, almost four tenths of a second faster than teammate Montoya. Barrichello was third, with Häkkinen and Coulthard fourth and fifth respectively. Michael Schumacher in sixth had a minor hydraulic malfunction, thus limiting his running to only the final 15 minutes. Trulli, Frentzen (who had to stop his car with an engine failure), Panis and Räikkönen completed the top ten.

== Qualifying ==
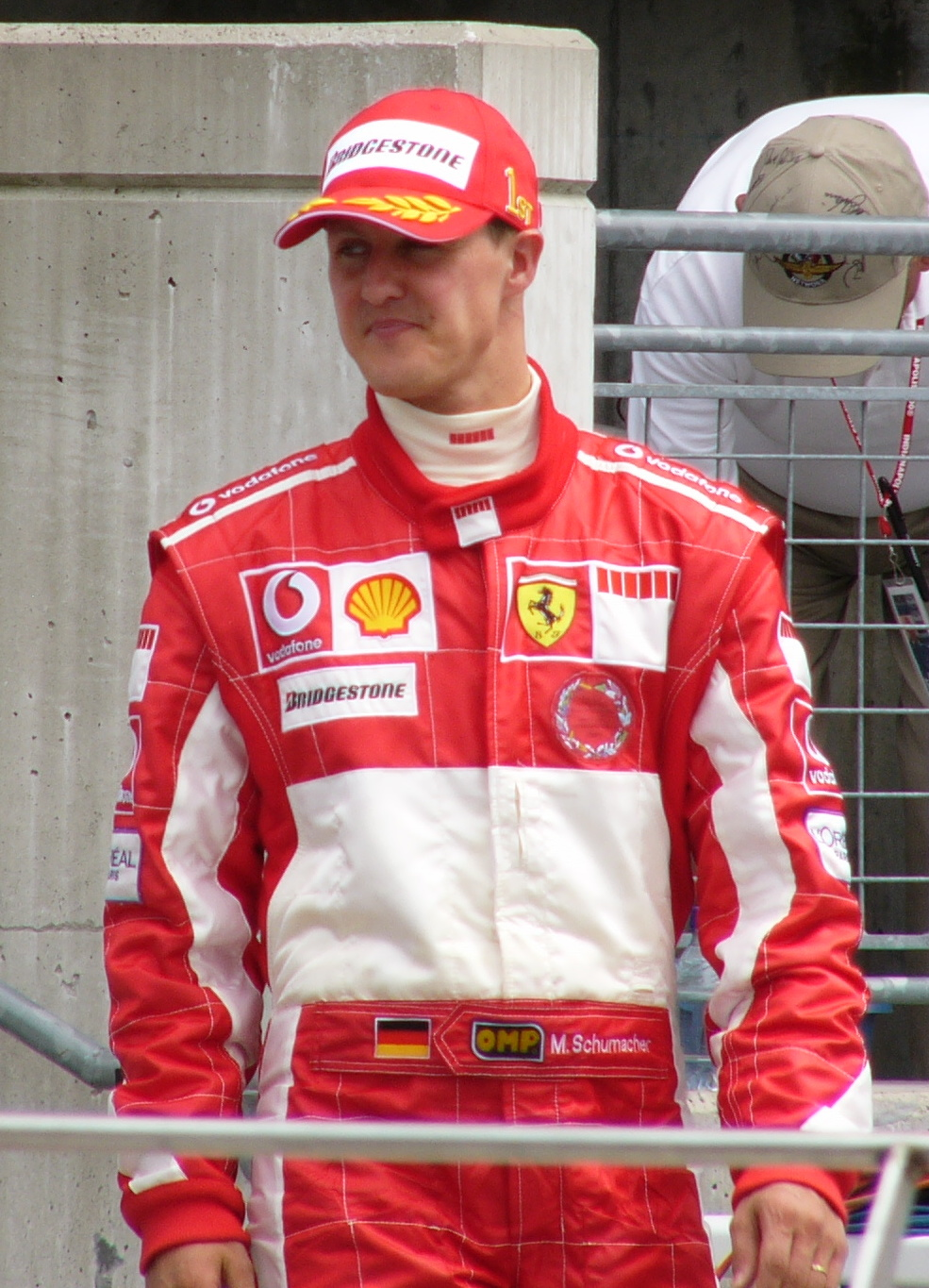
Michael Schumacher (pictured in 2005) took his seventh pole position of the season by setting the fastest timed lap in the one-hour qualifying session.

Each driver was limited to twelve laps during Saturday's one-hour qualifying session, with the starting order determined by their fastest laps. The 107% rule was in force during this session, which required each driver to set a time within 107% of the fastest lap to qualify for the race. Qualifying took place in overcast conditions. Because the track was cold, no driver qualified until after 15 minutes. Michael Schumacher completed eight of his 12 laps, and took his seventh pole position in nine races in 2001. His time of 1:14.960 was the overall track lap record, set on his second timed attempt, after adjusting his car's aerodynamics to extract more downforce. Ralf Schumacher qualified second, two tenths of a second slower, and held pole until Michael Schumacher lap. Montoya, third, made a car setup error between two runs and reported excessive oversteer. Barrichello was fourth with 11 minutes remaining after a power steering malfunction forced him to abort his second run, prompting his team to prepare a spare Ferrari for him if needed. Coulthard and Häkkinen were fifth and sixth, their best times six thousands of a second apart. Häkkinen could not accelerate out of the slow-speed corners without losing control of his car's rear, and made an error mounting the kerbs at the Veedol chicane. Coulthard attempted to lap faster after modifying his McLaren's front to try to strike the kerbs. On a lap with used front and new rear tires that caused oversteer, he spun into the edge of the gravel trap at the final Coca-Cola hairpin, while attempting to qualify on the second row. Yellow flags were waved and every driver had to slow. Trulli qualified seventh and felt he could have improved if not for slower cars and the yellow flag following Coulthard's spin. His teammate Frentzen was eighth after his final quick lap moved him from 11th.

Räikkönen was ninth, but Coulthard's spin cut his final run short. His teammate Heidfeld pushed too hard and ran wide into the first chicane, finishing tenth. Villeneuve qualified 11th as another driver ahead of him ran right into the chicane, losing time by going wide. Irvine, 12th, had severe understeer on his final run after setting a fast lap on a third set of tyres. Panis reported a lack of grip and could not match his lap times from practice, finishing 13th. Alesi, 14th, said that his car oversteered more than in practice due to increased track temperature, and encountered slower cars and yellow flags. Benetton's Giancarlo Fisichella, 15th, reported an improvement in his car on each run and had a decent chassis balance. Jaguar's Pedro de la Rosa took 16th with major understeer through turns three and four. Burti moved to teammate Alesi's spare vehicle, which had to be reset due to a fuel pressure issue with his racing car. The car's behaviour prevented him from lapping faster and he took 17th. The Arrows pair of Enrique Bernoldi and Jos Verstappen were 18th and 19th. Bernoldi noted a significant loss of grip as track temperature rose, while Verstappen noticed that his car lacked straightline speed compared to the morning sessions owing to a lack of grip. Fisichella's teammate Jenson Button in 20th reported excessive understeer and no grip. Minardi drivers Fernando Alonso and Marques qualified at the back of the grid in 21st and 22nd. Marques briefly stopped on track at the Veedol chicane with a loss of drive, and Alonso aborted his third run when he ran wide and lost a set of tyres.

=== Qualifying classification ===
Pos	No	Driver	Constructor	Lap	Gap	Grid
1	1	(Germany) Michael Schumacher	Ferrari	1:14.960	—	1
2	5	(Germany) Ralf Schumacher	Williams-BMW	1:15.226	+0.266	2
3	6	(Colombia) Juan Pablo Montoya	Williams-BMW	1:15.490	+0.530	3
4	2	(Brazil) Rubens Barrichello	Ferrari	1:15.622	+0.662	4
5	4	(United Kingdom) David Coulthard	McLaren-Mercedes	1:15.717	+0.757	5
6	3	(Finland) Mika Häkkinen	McLaren-Mercedes	1:15.776	+0.816	6
7	12	(Italy) Jarno Trulli	Jordan-Honda	1:16.138	+1.178	7
8	11	(Germany) Heinz-Harald Frentzen	Jordan-Honda	1:16.376	+1.416	8
9	17	(Finland) Kimi Räikkönen	Sauber-Petronas	1:16.402	+1.442	9
10	16	(Germany) Nick Heidfeld	Sauber-Petronas	1:16.438	+1.478	10
11	10	(Canada) Jacques Villeneuve	BAR-Honda	1:16.439	+1.479	11
12	18	(United Kingdom) Eddie Irvine	Jaguar-Cosworth	1:16.588	+1.628	12
13	9	(France) Olivier Panis	BAR-Honda	1:16.872	+1.912	13
14	22	(France) Jean Alesi	Prost-Acer	1:17.251	+2.291	14
15	7	(Italy) Giancarlo Fisichella	Benetton-Renault	1:17.378	+2.418	15
16	19	(Spain) Pedro de la Rosa	Jaguar-Cosworth	1:17.627	+2.667	16
17	23	(Brazil) Luciano Burti	Prost-Acer	1:18.113	+3.153	17
18	15	(Brazil) Enrique Bernoldi	Arrows-Asiatech	1:18.151	+3.191	18
19	14	(Netherlands) Jos Verstappen	Arrows-Asiatech	1:18.262	+3.302	19
20	8	(United Kingdom) Jenson Button	Benetton-Renault	1:18.626	+3.666	20
21	21	(Spain) Fernando Alonso	Minardi-European	1:18.630	+3.670	21
22	20	(Brazil) Tarso Marques	Minardi-European	1:18.689	+3.729	22
107% time: 1:20.207

== Warm-up ==
On race morning, a 30-minute warm-up session was held in sunny and warm conditions. Teams concentrated on preparing their cars for the race, and some drivers used spare cars. Both Ferrari drivers continued their outstanding performance from qualifying; Barrichello achieved the quickest time of 1:18.209 with five minutes left; his teammate Michael Schumacher was second. Ralf Schumacher was just off Michael Schumacher's pace in third, with Irvine, Coulthard, Montoya, early pacesetter Trulli, Häkkinen and the Sauber duo of Heidfeld and Räikkönen following in the top ten. No major incidents occurred during the session. Marques was affected by an engine and gearbox failure on his car.

== Race ==
The 67-lap race was held before between 100,000 and 150,000 spectators in the afternoon from 14:00 local time. (Note: Sources vary on the attendance, including 100,000, 142,000, and 150,000.) The conditions were dry, warm and sunny for the race. The air temperature ranged from 21 to 23 °C (70 to 73 °F) and the track temperature was between 30 and 34 °C (86 and 93 °F); conditions were forecast to be constant, with a 20% chance of rain. Michael Schumacher, driving a spare Ferrari, came to a halt at the bottom of the hill at the Dunlop hairpin while on a reconnaissance lap due to a fuel pump failure. He commandeered a motor scooter back to the pit lane before it was closed and drove his racing car to the grid. Marques, from 22nd on the grid, stalled his Minardi car on the formation lap due to a launch control issue and had to start manually. Autosport wrote that race strategy would be concerned with limiting damage since inclement weather in the past two years and tyre degradation.

When the five lights went out to begin the race, Ralf Schumacher started faster than Michael Schumacher because of his car's launch control system. Michael Schumacher's launch control system was not correctly tuned, thus he veered to the right to put Ralf Schumacher on the inside towards the pit lane barrier, keeping the race lead into the Castrol-S chicane as the latter had to decelerate to prevent a collision. Montoya maintained his grid position of third. Behind the leading trio, Barrichello made a slow start due to a launch control issue, dropping from fourth to seventh. Marques ran wide into the gravel trap at the Castrol-S chicane but returned to the racecourse unscathed. Verstappen, who started 19th, had the best start in the spare Arrows car after his race car developed a fuel pressure issue, moving up five positions to 14th. Irvine overtook Villeneuve for 11th. Michael Schumacher led Ralf Schumacher by 1.4 seconds at the end of the first lap, followed by Montoya, Coulthard, Häkkinen, and Trulli.

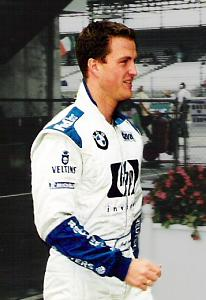
Ralf Schumacher (pictured in 2002) was behind his brother for much of the race until he was penalised with a ten-second stop-and-go penalty for crossing the white line at the pit lane exit.

Michael Schumacher and Ralf Schumacher began to pull away from the rest of the field, with the former gaining an advantage over the latter due to his light fuel load. The race began processional as cars ran in formation with few overtakes occurring. Marques became the Grand Prix's first retirement on lap eight, pulling over to the side of the track due to a gearbox failure caused by voltage fluctuations. Michael Schumacher's advantage over Ralf Schumacher was 3.4 seconds at the start of lap 11.Around this time, Ralf Schumacher began to close up to Michael Schumacher with a series of fastest laps using his car's powerful BMW engine. His older Michelin tyres began to warm up and increase his performance as his brother's Bridgestone tyres wore out. The gap closed to under one second by the conclusion of lap 17.

On the following lap, Michael Schumacher locked the rear brakes and ran wide to the outside of the track, into the downhill Dunlop hairpin. Ralf Schumacher tried to take the race lead on the inside, but Michael Schumacher defended on the racing line. Over the next ten laps, Ralf Schumacher pressed Michael Schumacher, who was pushing hard to keep the race lead from his brother despite periodically sending his rear wheels off the track exiting the corners. Montoya was able to close in on the two cars by setting a series of fastest laps in an attempt to capitalise on their duel. On lap 22, Häkkinen ran wide on the grass and kerbs at the Veedol chicane after flat-spotting his front right tyre, causing a severe vibration. Two laps later, Panis spun into the Dunlop hairpin gravel trap due to an electronic malfunction in the gear change mechanism. On lap 27, Montoya set the race circuit lap record of 1:18.354, closing in on the battle for first and second place.

Michael Schumacher and Ralf Schumacher, separated by four-tenths of a second, were the first of the leading drivers to make their first pit stops at the end of lap 28. Both drivers chose a two-stop strategy, while Michael Schumacher's teammate Barrichello and the McLaren drivers followed a one-stop strategy. When Michael Schumacher realised his brother was making a pit stop, he turned right into the pit lane entrance, diving pit lane from the racing track at the last possible moment, crossing the white line and forcing him to cut in front of Ralf Schumacher, a legal manoeuvre. Swift work from the Ferrari crew allowed Michael Schumacher to stay ahead of Ralf Schumacher, who overshot his pit box and lost time as a result. As both drivers exited the pitlane, Ralf Schumacher cut to the left, illegally crossing over the white line designating the end of the pit lane straight to keep drivers on the inside of the circuit upon exiting since he was concentrating on Coulthard ahead of him. Montoya took the lead on lap 29 before making his first of two pit stops, returning to the track in fourth.

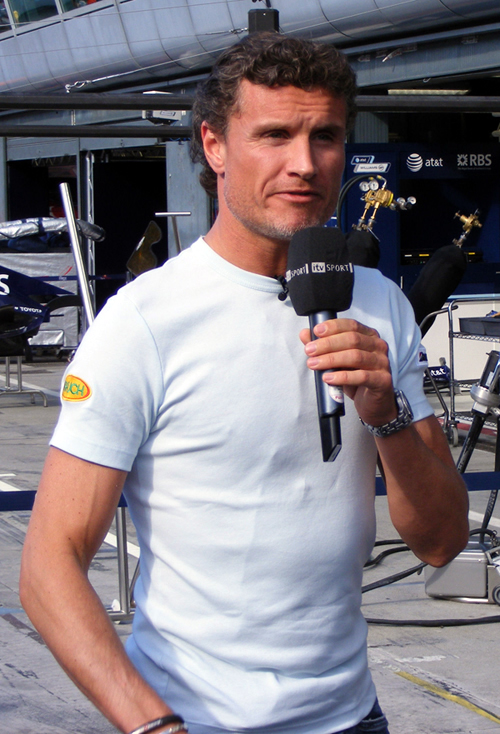
David Coulthard (pictured in 2007) finished in third place despite lacking pace in his McLaren.

On lap 31, Ralf Schumacher passed Coulthard for second at the Dunlop hairpin, deciding that delaying the former would yield little benefit. Coulthard wanted to observe Ralf Schumacher close down on Michael Schumacher after seeing their earlier battle on television displays around the circuit. Bernoldi pulled over to the side of the track on the same lap, his car's gearbox locked in fifth gear. Barrichello overtook Häkkinen at the chicane for fifth on lap 32. Montoya was battling Coulthard for third and attempted to overtake him at the Veedol chicane, but his brakes locked. He ran wide onto the grass at the turn on the next lap. Montoya rejoined the track without losing any positions. Häkkinen made his only pit stop on the same lap, dropping to tenth. On lap 39, his teammate Coulthard made his only pit stop and returned to the track in sixth.

Ferrari technical director Ross Brawn alerted team principal Jean Todt that Ralf Schumacher had crossed the white line at the pit lane exit, which Todt reported to FIA race director Charlie Whiting by email. As Michael Schumacher increased his advantage over Ralf Schumacher because his new tyres provided him greater pace over his brother who was running on worn tyres, the FIA stewards told the Williams team that Ralf Schumacher had received a ten-second stop-and-go penalty for crossing the white line at the pit exit. Williams brought Ralf Schumacher into the pit lane to serve his penalty at the end of lap 39, dropping him from second to fourth. This promoted his teammate Montoya to second and Barrichello to third; the penalty effectively eliminated Ralf Schumacher's chances of winning the race. On lap 44, Barrichello made his only pit stop of the race from third. The stop lasted 10.3 seconds and he fell to fifth.

On lap 46, Trulli retired his car on the grass after the Bit curve turn due to a gearbox failure caused by an oil pressure problem. Two laps later, Alesi attempted to pass Heidfeld for twelfth place, and the two drivers collided lightly when Heidfeld did a defensive manoeuvre on Alesi. Frentzen spun his car after the Dunlop hairpin on lap 50 due to a traction control system failure and retired to the side of the track. Michael Schumacher and Montoya made their second pit stops at the conclusion of the lap. Both drivers retained first and second places following their pit stops. Ralf Schumacher entered the pit lane for his second scheduled pit stop three laps later and rejoined in fourth, behind Coulthard. Heidfeld drove slowly to the pit lane due to his previous incident with Alesi, which bent a driveshaft, and was pushed into the garage on lap 56 to retire on safety grounds. Burti battled Button for 14th and overtook him on lap 56.

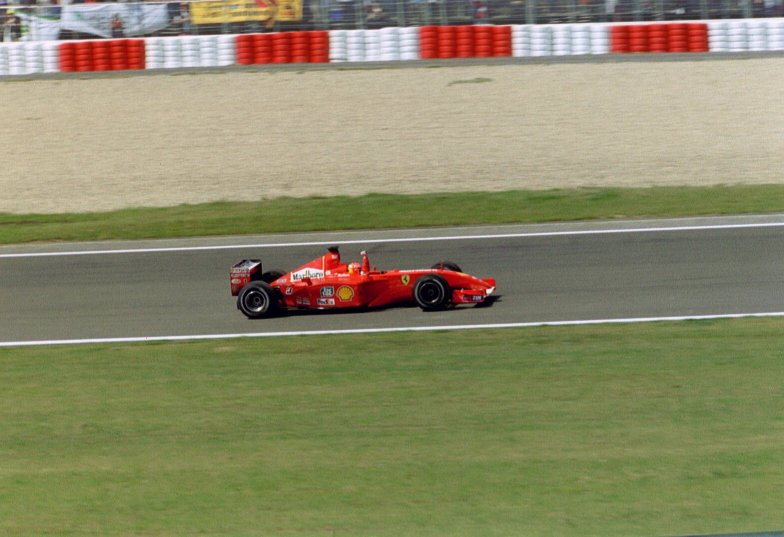
Michael Schumacher, who took pole position and won the race by 4.1 seconds

On lap 60, Barrichello made a mistake and skidded onto the grass, but he remained in fifth place. Verstappen went onto escape road after his engine failed on lap 62. Alesi attempted to brake later than Räikkönen, who had closed the inside line, into the Dunlop hairpin for 11th place on the penultimate lap, but spun into the gravel trap and retired. Michael Schumacher reduced his pace, and retained the lead for the rest of the race, securing his fifth victory of the nine races held thus far in the season and 49th overall, putting him two behind Alain Prost's all-time win record of 51. Montoya registered his second race finish of the season, finishing second, 4.1 seconds behind Michael Schumacher. Coulthard, who was off the pace, finished third 20 seconds back. Ralf Schumacher was catching Coulthard until his pace dropped and he finished fourth. Barrichello finished fifth and Häkkinen completed the points-scorers in sixth. Irvine and De la Rosa finished seventh and eighth after Jaguar implemented a one-stop strategy. Villeneuve finished ninth, 1.7 seconds behind De la Rosa, unable to extract more performance from his tyres. Blistering tyres left Räikkönen in tenth. Benetton's Fisichella and Button finished 11th and 13th, respectively; both drivers reported rear tyre handling issues. Burti was 12th after grass penetrated his car's radiators when he ran off the track on lap 10 owing to blistering tyres from running in teammate Alesi's slipstream and had them cleaned. Alonso finished 14th and was the final driver to finish despite late-race engine difficulties. Despite not finishing the race, Alesi was the last classified finisher.

=== Post-race ===
The top three drivers appeared on the podium to collect their trophies and spoke to the media at the press conference held afterwards. Michael Schumacher said of his victory, "We have had a superb weekend, we got pole position, we got the win, we had a nice race again together, Ralf and myself, until the stop and go, so it was quite an entertaining weekend." Montoya said he "had pretty good luck" and added that he was relieved to finish second after errors in the preceding two races. He stated that he was pushing after his second pit stop since his car could go fast and he was able to handle it in a way that allowed him to drive smoothly. Coulthard thought finishing third was his best possible result and that he would have finished fourth if Ralf Schumacher had not been penalised. He stated that he believed that a one-stop strategy from where he started the race was the best decision.

Following the race, Ralf Schumacher confronted his brother Michael in the scrutineering garage about being forced towards the pit lane barrier at the start. He would not discuss the start, but did issue a statement in which he expressed his disappointment in receiving a ten-second stop-and-go penalty for crossing the white line at the pit lane exit, which he believed may have lost him the race victory. Michael Schumacher contended that reaching the first corner in the lead was his first aim, and that his manoeuvre was permissible under the one-move rule. Coulthard agreed that the manoeuvre was legal, but he thought that requiring a driver to take evasive action or brake was not the right thing to do. BMW Motorsport director Gerhard Berger said he was unsurprised over the manoevure, calling it "hard, but that's racing." Brawn explained that in regards to the penalty it was common for teams to make queries to the FIA. Ralf Schumacher left the track that night without talking to the media. He said two days after the race that he would have performed the same manoeuvre as his brother at the start and was still upset with race officials about his penalty.

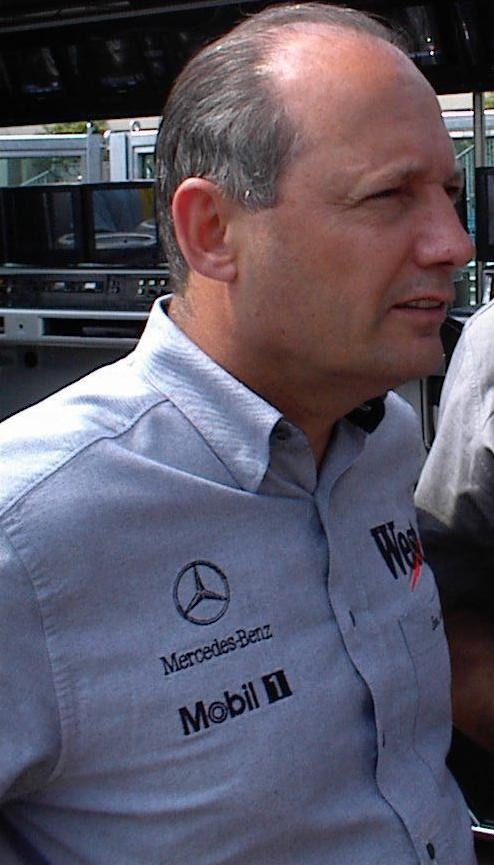
Ron Dennis (pictured in 2000) defended McLaren driver Mika Häkkinen's form

Ferrari president Luca di Montezemolo called the race outcome "one of Schumacher's best ever wins with Ferrari" and that victory against their primary rivals in their home nation of Germany was "even more satisfying and motivating." Barrichello attributed his fifth-place finish to running a one-stop strategy and carrying a lot of fuel, which prevented him from racing with competitors close behind him, adding, "It was just one of those days which didn't work out right." Häkkinen expressed disappointment with his sixth-place finish, claiming that tyre vibration and early pitting cost him spots. McLaren team principal Ron Dennis defended Häkkinen, stating the driver slowed due to a tyre issue and resulting vibrations, preventing him from finishing fourth.

The race result saw Michael Schumacher extend his World Drivers' Championship lead with 68 championship points. Coulthard was second with 44 championship points, 18 ahead of Barrichello in third, and 19 ahead of Ralf Schumacher in fourth. Montoya's second-place finish moved him from eleventh to fifth. With eight races remaining in the season, Ferrari maintained their World Constructors' Championship lead with 94 championship points, McLaren remained second with 53 championship points, and Williams remained third with 37 championship points.

=== Race classification ===
Drivers who scored championship points are denoted in bold.

Pos	No	Driver	Constructor	Tyre	Laps	Time/Retired	Grid	Points
1	1	(Germany) **Michael Schumacher**	**Ferrari**	B	67	1:29:42.724	1	10
2	6	(Colombia) **Juan Pablo Montoya**	**Williams-BMW**	M	67	+4.127	3	6
3	4	(United Kingdom) **David Coulthard**	**McLaren-Mercedes**	B	67	+24.993	5	4
4	5	(Germany) **Ralf Schumacher**	**Williams-BMW**	M	67	+33.345	2	3
5	2	(Brazil) **Rubens Barrichello**	**Ferrari**	B	67	+45.495	4	2
6	3	(Finland) **Mika Häkkinen**	**McLaren-Mercedes**	B	67	+1:04.868	6	1
7	18	(United Kingdom) Eddie Irvine	Jaguar-Cosworth	M	67	+1:06.198	12	
8	19	(Spain) Pedro de la Rosa	Jaguar-Cosworth	M	66	+1 Lap	16	
9	10	(Canada) Jacques Villeneuve	BAR-Honda	B	66	+1 Lap	11	
10	17	(Finland) Kimi Räikkönen	Sauber-Petronas	B	66	+1 Lap	9	
11	7	(Italy) Giancarlo Fisichella	Benetton-Renault	M	66	+1 Lap	15	
12	23	(Brazil) Luciano Burti	Prost-Acer	M	65	+2 Laps	17	
13	8	(United Kingdom) Jenson Button	Benetton-Renault	M	65	+2 Laps	20	
14	21	(Spain) Fernando Alonso	Minardi-European	M	65	+2 Laps	21	
15	22	(France) Jean Alesi	Prost-Acer	M	64	Spun off	14	
Ret	14	(Netherlands) Jos Verstappen	Arrows-Asiatech	B	58	Engine	19	
Ret	16	(Germany) Nick Heidfeld	Sauber-Petronas	B	54	Driveshaft	10	
Ret	11	(Germany) Heinz-Harald Frentzen	Jordan-Honda	B	48	Traction control	8	
Ret	12	(Italy) Jarno Trulli	Jordan-Honda	B	44	Transmission	7	
Ret	15	(Brazil) Enrique Bernoldi	Arrows-Asiatech	B	29	Gearbox	18	
Ret	9	(France) Olivier Panis	BAR-Honda	B	23	Electrical	13	
Ret	20	(Brazil) Tarso Marques	Minardi-European	M	7	Electrical	22	

== Championship standings after the race ==
Drivers' Championship standings

+/–	Pos	Driver	Points
	1	(Germany) Michael Schumacher	68
	2	(United Kingdom) David Coulthard	44
	3	(Brazil) Rubens Barrichello	26
	4	(Germany) Ralf Schumacher	25
5	5	(Colombia) Juan Pablo Montoya	12

Constructors' Championship standings

+/–	Pos	Driver	Points
	1	(Italy) Ferrari	94
	2	(United Kingdom) McLaren-Mercedes	53
	3	(United Kingdom) Williams-BMW	37
	4	(Switzerland) Sauber-Petronas	15
	5	(Republic of Ireland) Jordan-Honda	13
Sources:

- Note: Only the top five positions are included for both sets of standings.

== Notes ==
Previous race: 2001 Canadian Grand Prix	FIA Formula One World Championship; 2001 season	Next race: 2001 French Grand Prix
Previous race: 2000 European Grand Prix	European Grand Prix	Next race: 2002 European Grand Prix
