= Bargeboard (aerodynamics) =

Piece of aerodynamic bodywork on open wheel racecars

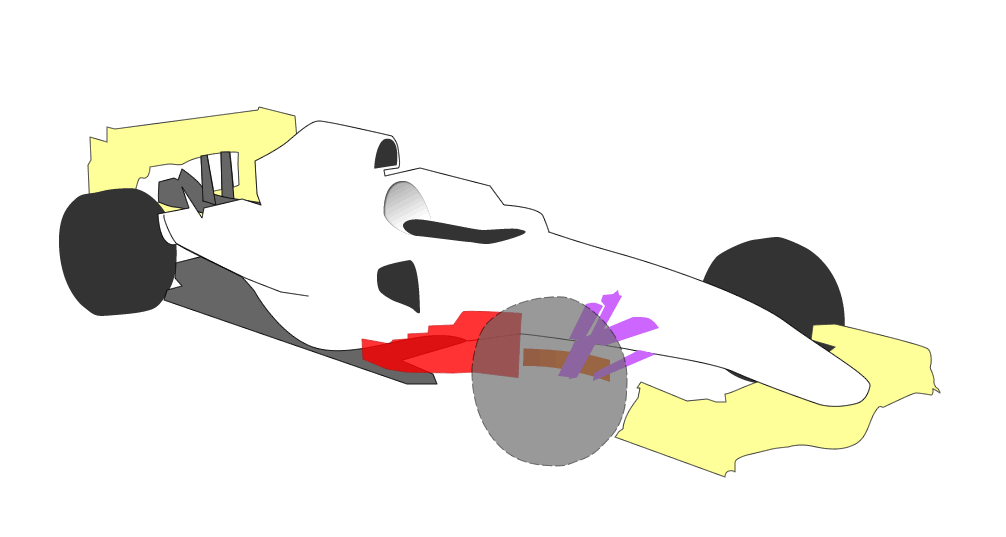
Bargeboards (red) and turning vanes (orange) shown on a Formula One car, circa 2007

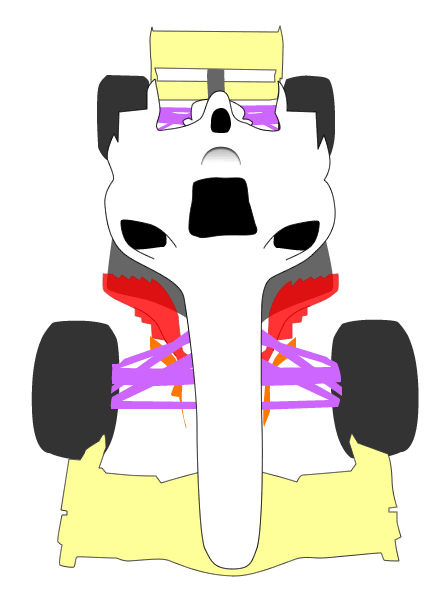
Bargeboards (red) and turning vanes (orange) shown on a Formula One car, circa 2007

Bargeboards are pieces of bodywork on open-wheel racing cars, serving a purely aerodynamic (as opposed to structural) function. They are curved vertical planes situated longitudinally, between the front wheels and the sidepods, held away from the chassis at the front on struts or other connectors, and connecting to the sidepods or extensions of the floor at the rear.

In general, bargeboards are significantly taller at the front than at the rear making them trapezoidal in profile, and they curve outward in plan view, being closer to the centerline of the car at the front, and curving out towards the rear. They were introduced by McLaren at the 1993 South African Grand Prix, before being adopted by Benetton and other Formula One teams.

== Function ==
Aerodynamically, bargeboards act primarily as flow conditioners, smoothing and redirecting the turbulent or "dirty" air in the wake of the front wing, the front suspension links, and the rotating front wheels. Part of their function is to direct the turbulent wakes of the front wing and spinning front wheels away from downstream aerodynamic surfaces. In this capacity, they separate different components of this mixture of flows, and direct them either outside and around the sidepods, or direct flow towards the radiator inlets. As such, the configuration of bargeboards can have significance with respect to cooling. They also help direct flow behind the front wheels, reducing the wake drag created by the wheel profile.

=== Vortex generators ===
Another important function of bargeboards is to act as vortex generators, redirecting and energizing airflow. The upper, downward sloping edge can shed a large vortex downstream around the sidepods, where it can interact favorably with flip-ups, or aid in sealing the low pressure underbody flow from the ambient stream. The bottom edge of the bargeboard can also shed vortices that energize the airflow to the underbody, which can help delay flow separation and allow the use of more aggressive diffuser profiles. In recent years, these two edges have acquired relatively large serrations or protruding tabs to enhance this aspect of their performance.

== Turning vanes ==
Smaller, similar structures are often situated further forward, between the front wheels and the monocoque. These are typically called "turning vanes" rather than bargeboards, and are used in addition to, or sometimes in place of full bargeboards, depending on the aerodynamic approach of the car. Initially relatively simple in their design, bargeboards and turning vanes became progressively more complex through the 2000s, integrating with the floor, mirror supports, suspension mounts, and other structures in more elaborate ways.

== See also ==
- Auto racing
- Formula racing
- Motorsport
