= Arrows A22 =

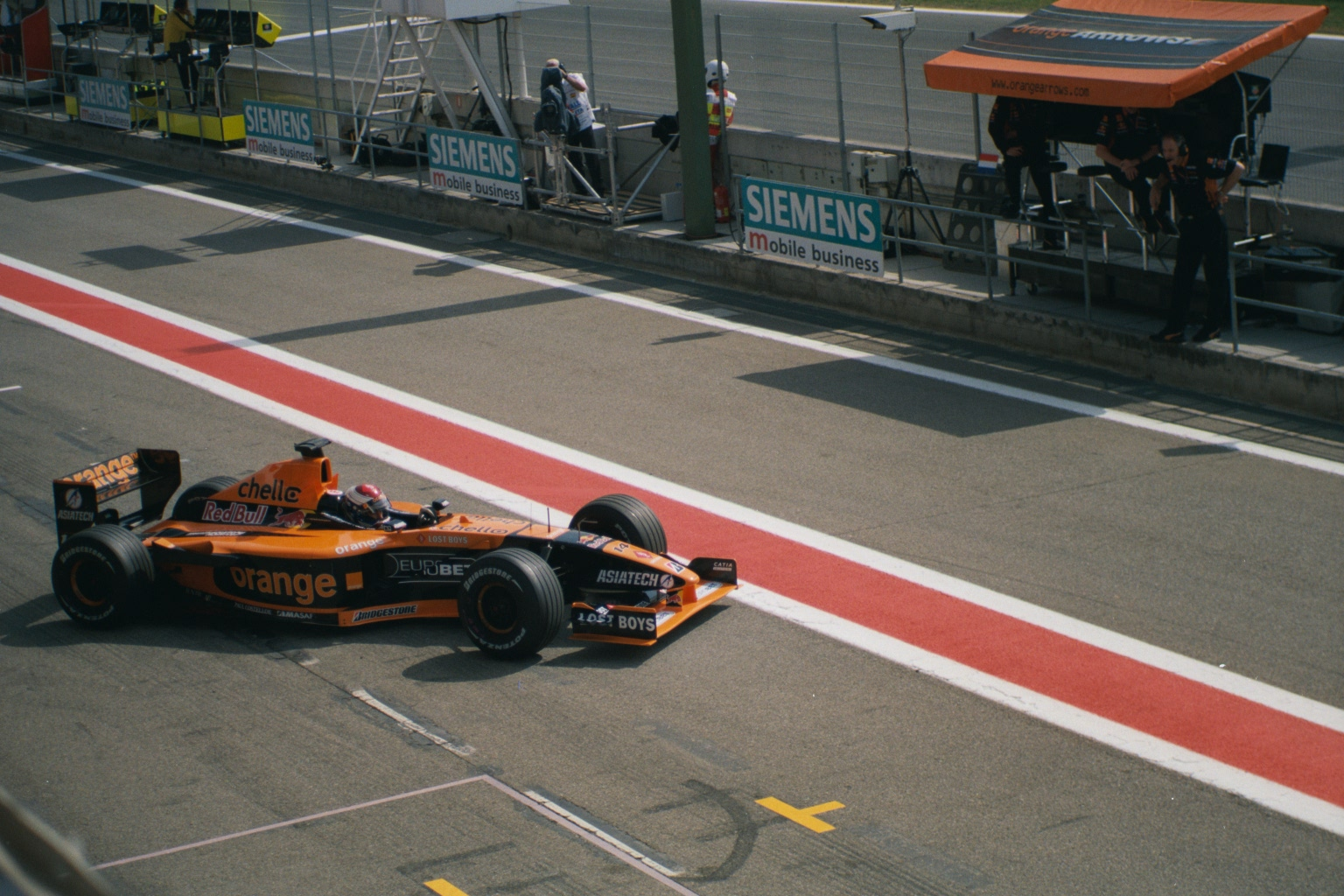
- Category: Formula One
- Constructor: Arrows
- Designers: Mike Coughlan (Technical Director); Rob Taylor (Chief Designer); John Davis (Head of R&D); Nicolò Petrucci (Head of Aerodynamics)
- Predecessor: A21
- Successor: A23

Technical specifications
- Chassis: Carbon-fibre monocoque
- Suspension (front): in-board operated independent, carbon-fibre pullrods
- Suspension (rear): in-board operated independent, carbon-fibre pushrods
- Engine: Asiatech 001 3.0-litre V10 (72°) naturally-aspirated, mid-engined
- Transmission: Arrows 6-speed carbon-fibre longitudinal sequential manual
- Power: 800 hp @ 17,500 RPM
- Fuel: Elf
- Tyres: Bridgestone

Competition history
- Notable entrants: Orange Arrows Asiatech
- Notable drivers: 14. (Netherlands) Jos Verstappen; 15. (Brazil) Enrique Bernoldi
- Debut: 2001 Australian Grand Prix
- Last event: 2001 Japanese Grand Prix
| Races | Wins | Poles | F/Laps |
|---|---|---|---|
| 17 | 0 | 0 | 0 |
- Constructors' Championships: 0
- Drivers' Championships: 0

The Arrows A22 was the car with which the Arrows team competed in the 2001 Formula One World Championship. It was driven by Dutchman Jos Verstappen, who was in his second year with the team, and Enrique Bernoldi, a Brazilian rookie who brought sponsorship from Red Bull, at the expense of Spaniard Pedro de la Rosa who was unexpectedly dropped shortly before the season started.

== Overview ==
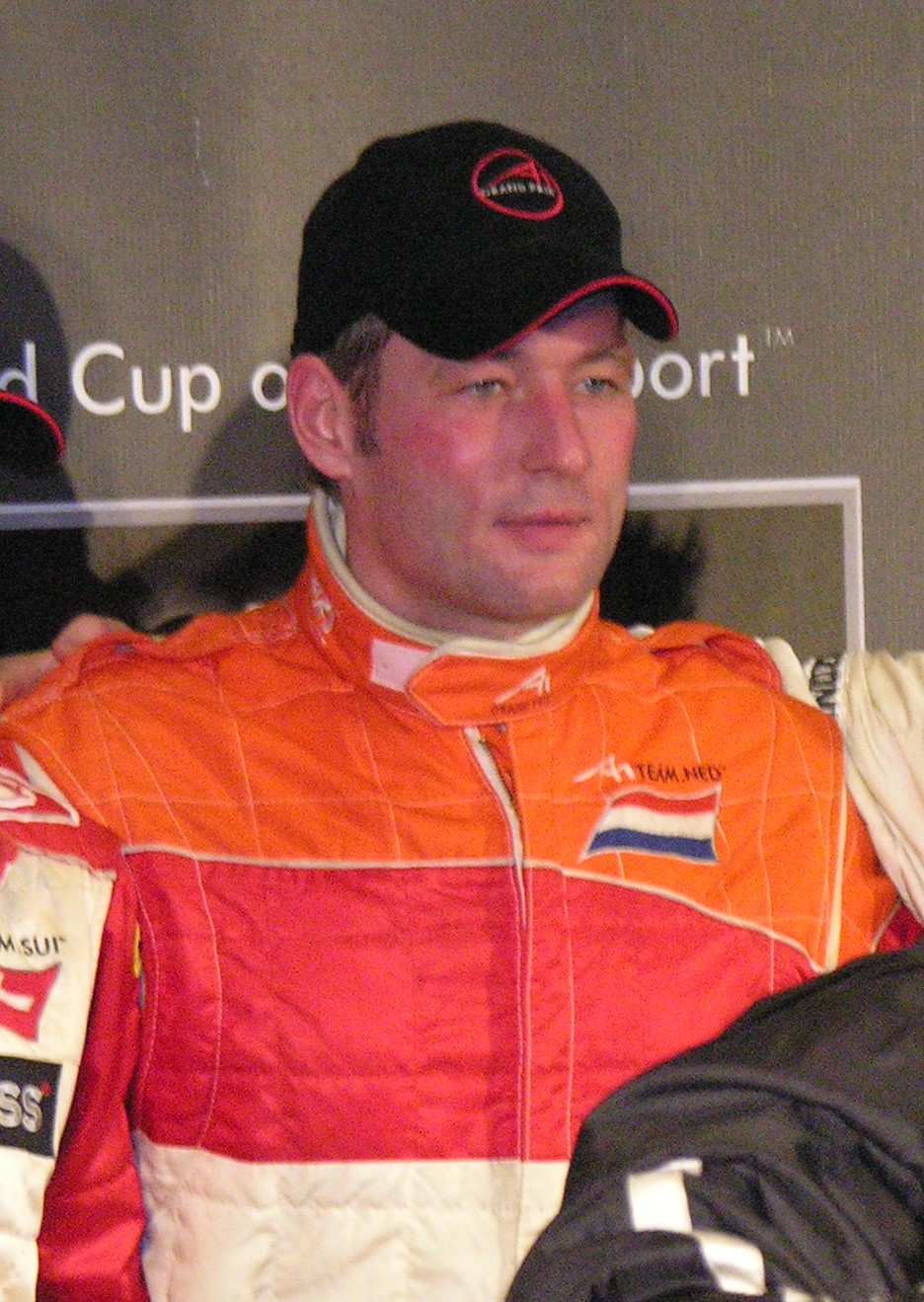
Jos Verstappen scored Arrows' only point of the season at the 2001 Austrian Grand Prix.

The A22 was a development of the previous year's highly promising A21. The front suspension was changed from a pullrod to a pushrod arrangement, but otherwise the two cars were almost identical. However, the project was hamstrung by changing engine suppliers for the second year in a row. In early 2000, Renault announced their return to F1 for 2001, and bought Supertec. Faced with the possibility of having to pay for expensive customer engines, Tom Walkinshaw signed a deal with Asiatech, a private development of the unsuccessful Peugeot engine which the Prost team had used in 2000. Walkinshaw had been offered an exclusive and most importantly cheap deal and technical director Mike Coughlan believed the new engine suited the Arrows chassis package better. Initial testing took place in August 2000. Jos Verstappen was also enthused about the new engine at first. The engine was less powerful than its predecessor, and also had reliability problems. The car barely completed a lap during its initial shakedown.

The team made the decision to equip the car with a very small fuel tank. This resulted in several high-profile, low-fuel strategies as the drivers, particularly Verstappen, used their light cars to good effect in the opening stages of many of the Grands Prix. Despite generally being outqualified by Bernoldi, the Dutchman's race pace was much quicker by comparison. However, the team's strategy only secured one point, at the Austrian GP. A memorable drive in a wet Malaysia where Verstappen ran as high as second at one point was unrewarded as he was forced to stop for fuel and therefore drop out of the points in the closing stages of the race. There were other moments of promise, but Verstappen also blotted his copybook by getting involved in an incident with race leading WilliamsF1 driver Juan Pablo Montoya at Interlagos, taking the Colombian out and costing him a $15,000 fine. Verstappen was also publicly critical of his team mate, labelling Bernoldi "the worst team mate I've ever had." This was in direct contrast to Bernoldi's predecessor Pedro de la Rosa.

In an attempt to improve front end downforce, an elevated front wing was tried in practice at Monaco, which was immediately banned by the FIA on safety grounds. The race is remembered for Bernoldi holding up David Coulthard's McLaren for nearly 40 laps, which caused the Scotsman to publicly criticise Bernoldi and the Arrows team.

By the end of the season, Arrows' lack of testing and limited budget began to tell, with both drivers sinking further towards the back of the field. While Orange remained as title sponsors, Eurobet terminated their sponsorship after posting huge losses. Bernoldi's Red Bull sponsorship went some way to offset this, but European Aviation and the associated logistical support they provided was moved to Minardi after Paul Stoddart bought that team just prior to the season. The focus shifted to 2002, and Team Principal Tom Walkinshaw secured a supply of powerful customer Cosworth engines for the next season.

The team eventually finished tenth in the Constructors' Championship, with one point.

== Later use ==
The A22 was used in BOSS GP driven by Bernd Herndlhofer.

== Complete Formula One results ==
(key) (results in bold indicate pole position)

| Year | Entrant | Engine | Tyres | Drivers | 1 | 2 | 3 | 4 | 5 | 6 | 7 | 8 | 9 | 10 | 11 | 12 | 13 | 14 | 15 | 16 | 17 | Points | WCC |
|---|---|---|---|---|---|---|---|---|---|---|---|---|---|---|---|---|---|---|---|---|---|---|---|
| 2001 | Orange Arrows Asiatech | Asiatech V10 | **B** | | AUS | MAL | BRA | SMR | ESP | AUT | MON | CAN | EUR | FRA | GBR | GER | HUN | BEL | ITA | USA | JPN | **1** | **10th** |
| 2001 | Orange Arrows Asiatech | Asiatech V10 | **B** | (Netherlands) Jos Verstappen | 10 | 7 | Ret | Ret | 12 | 6 | 8 | 10 | Ret | 13 | 10 | 9 | 12 | 10 | Ret | Ret | 15 | **1** | **10th** |
| 2001 | Orange Arrows Asiatech | Asiatech V10 | **B** | (Brazil) Enrique Bernoldi | Ret | Ret | Ret | 10 | Ret | Ret | 9 | Ret | Ret | Ret | 14 | 8 | Ret | 12 | Ret | 13 | 14 | **1** | **10th** |
