= Enrique Bernoldi =

Brazilian racing driver (born 1978)

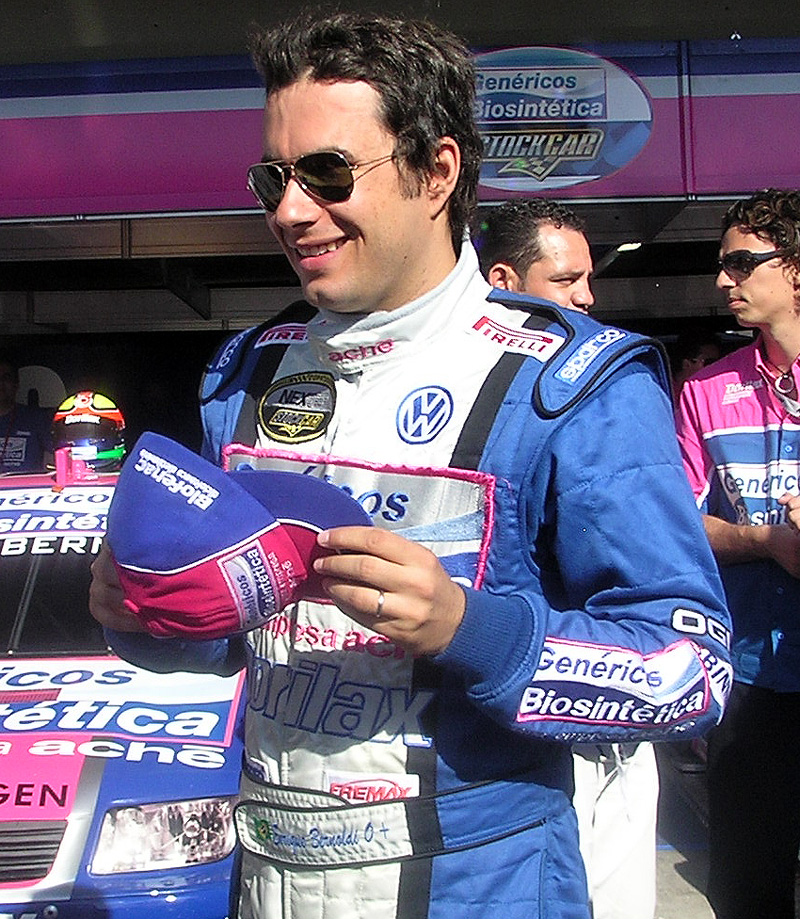
- Bernoldi in 2007, as a Stock Car Brasil driver
- Nationality: (Brazil) Brazilian
- Born: Enrique Antônio Langue e Silvério de Bernoldi; 19 October 1978 (age 48) Curitiba, Brazil

Previous series
- 2012 2012 2012 2011 2009–11 2009 2009 2008 2008 2007, 2009 2006 2003–04 2001–02 1999–2000 1997–98 1997–98 1997–98 1996 1995–96 1995–96 1995: Italian GT Championship; SPEED Euroseries; FIA World Endurance Championship; GT Brasil; FIA GT1 World Championship; FIA GT Championship; Superleague Formula; IndyCar Series; Champ Car World Series; Stock Car Brasil; TC 2000; World Series by Nissan; Formula One; Formula 3000; Masters of Formula 3 Macau Grand Prix; British Formula 3 Championship; Renault Spider Europe; Formula Renault Eurocup; Championnat de France Formule Renault; Formula Alfa Boxer

Championship titles
- 1996: Formula Renault Eurocup

Formula One World Championship career
- Active years: 2001–2002
- Team: Arrows
- Entries: 29 (28 starts)
- Championships: 0
- Wins: 0
- Podiums: 0
- Career points: 0
- Pole positions: 0
- Fastest laps: 0
- First entry: 2001 Australian Grand Prix
- Last entry: 2002 German Grand Prix

Enrique Antônio Langue e Silvério de Bernoldi (Portuguese pronunciation: [ẽˈʁi.ki beʁ.now.dʒi]; born 19 October 1978) is a Brazilian former professional racing driver who raced for the Arrows Formula One team in 2001 and 2002, and was the test driver for British American Racing (later Honda) between 2004 and 2006. He entered IndyCar racing in 2008, and competed in the FIA GT World Championship between 2009 and 2011, in addition to entering multiple other competitions.

== Racing career ==
=== Early career ===
Bernoldi was born on 19 October 1978, in Curitiba, Paraná. He originally wanted to be a jockey because he liked horses but he received a go-kart from his parents as a gift for his seventh birthday. Bernoldi gained the inspiration to drive from watching compatriots Nelson Piquet and Ayrton Senna. He began karting when he was nine years old, and he won multiple regional and national titles. Bernoldi won the Brazilian Paulista Kart Championship every year from 1989 to 1991 and claimed title honours in the Brazilian Kart Championship in 1990 and 1991. He went on to finish third at the 1992 Paulista Kart Championship in Brazil as well as placing third in the 1993 South American Kart Championship and fourth in the 1993 Pan-American Kart Championship.

Bernoldi travelled to Europe at the age of sixteen to begin his car racing career. He entered the Formula Alfa Boxer series in Italy, where he finished fourth in his first race. Following a successful single entry in the Championnat de France Formule Renault, Bernoldi then entered the Eurocup Formula Renault 2.0 and won on his debut, the final round of the series. The following year, he took in nine victories in eleven rounds and the title, before entering British Formula Three with the Promatecme team in 1997. Bernoldi was hospitalised after he was involved in a road traffic accident in early January 1997 and was in a coma for three days. He required physiotherapy to recover in time for his F3 debut two months later. He took his first victory at Spa-Francorchamps en route to fifth in the championship, and also finished third at that year's Macau Grand Prix. Bernoldi remained with Promatecme for 1998 to take six more victories, and he was able to finish runner-up to compatriot Mario Haberfeld. He finished second at the 1998 Masters of Formula 3 and third at the 1998 Macau Grand Prix.

In 1999, Bernoldi progressed to the International Formula 3000 championship with the Red Bull Junior Team and drove the Lola T99/50-Zytek car. His first choice was West Competition alongside Nick Heidfeld but was not signed despite running fastest in a test session with the team. Although his debut season only resulted in two points accumulated in a single event out of a possible ten for eighteenth in the Drivers' Championship, he was retained by the team for the following year, finishing that season sixteenth in the points standings with five points scored in three of the ten rounds he raced. He was frequently fastest in late-year testing for the 2001 season and was the favourite to win that year's championship. Bernoldi would not participate in the series that year.

Due to the Red Bull Junior Team's links with Sauber, Bernoldi tested for the Formula 1 team in both seasons, in addition to also testing for the Prost Grand Prix team in 2000. Although touted before the start of the 2001 season to be joining either Prost, Minardi, or Sauber, Bernoldi instead signed a three-year contract to drive for the Arrows squad with the option to extend his stay at the team for a further two years after his first season with them. He replaced the contracted Pedro de la Rosa because Bernoldi had provided Arrows with a budget.

=== Formula One ===
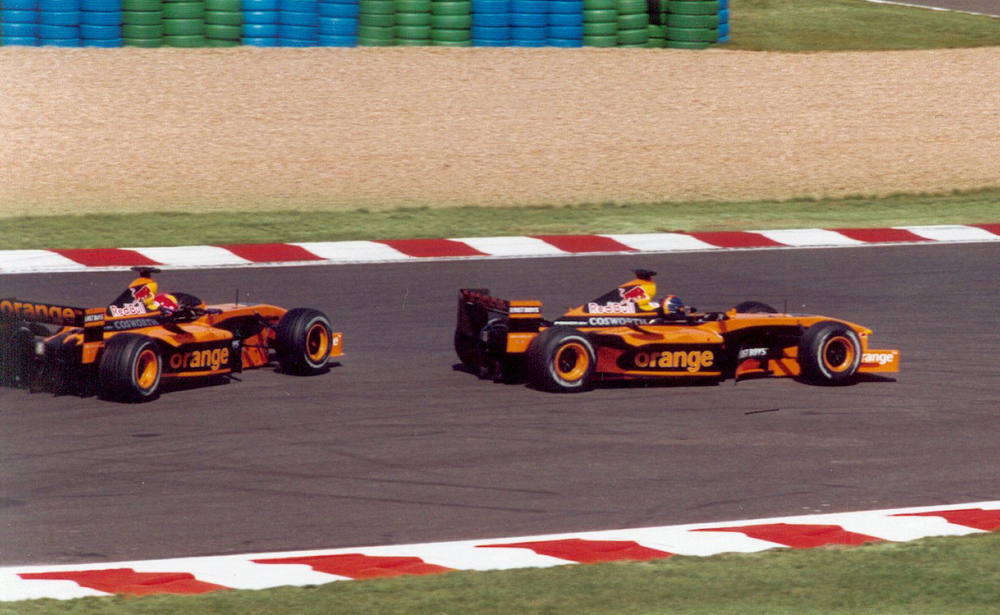
Bernoldi follows Arrows teammate Heinz-Harald Frentzen at the 2002 French Grand Prix.

Driving the A22-Asiatech car that had a small fuel tank to take advantage of the tyre battle between Bridgestone and Michelin during the 2001 season, Bernoldi performed respectably for the Arrows team, occasionally matching his more experienced teammate Jos Verstappen for pace in qualifying but performed less well than Verstappen during races. However, he gained notoriety for his efforts at the Monaco Grand Prix, where he held up the much faster McLaren car of David Coulthard for 35 laps; after a botched start, Coulthard had been fighting his way through the field, only to be stuck behind the Arrows, prompting irate responses from both Coulthard and McLaren team principal Ron Dennis. Bernoldi was defended by his team boss Tom Walkinshaw, who hit back at McLaren. He failed to score any points in 2001 due to the car's engine being unreliable and Bernoldi making driver errors, with ten retirements from seventeen starts, his highest finish being an eighth at the German Grand Prix. He did however improve his driving by the end of the season but did not contribute to improving the car's technical aspects. Bernoldi concluded the season without any scoring points in the World Drivers' Championship.

Even though Verstappen was the only Arrows driver to score points in 2001, Bernoldi was retained by Arrows for the 2002 championship, being partnered by Heinz-Harald Frentzen and drove one of the team's A23-Cosworth vehicles. At Sepang he notably overtook Michael Schumacher, having been passed by the German as he attempted to fight through the field after a first-lap incident with Juan Pablo Montoya, although his driving in that race was criticised by Allan McNish. Due to serious financial problems, Arrows were forced to withdraw three-quarters of the way into the 2002 season. Bernoldi thus again did not score any points in the World Drivers' Championship in the 11 races he entered. He subsequently switched to the World Series by Nissan to try and rebuild his reputation, after a potential drive for Jordan Grand Prix failed to materialise due to legal constraints.

=== 2003–2007 ===
In his debut season in the World Series by Nissan, Bernoldi finished sixth in the championship, having won two races. He also participated in a "mega test", held by Alfa Romeo, with a prospect of driving for the team in the 2004 European Touring Car Championship. Despite this test, he continued in the World Series in 2004, and finished third overall, with another pair of wins. In mid-2004 he was named a test driver for BAR, completing two tests at the Circuito de Jerez in Spain, in order to prevent the regular BAR drivers having to make several long-distance trips. He remained with the team after these sessions, also undertaking tests of BAR's "Concept Car" (a hybrid F1 car with a 2004 frontal setup mixed with a 2005 rear setup). He remained BAR's test driver for 2005, but began to look for pastures new in 2006, participating in less tests for the now-renamed Honda Racing F1 Team - although he did remain as official test driver. Although he impressed in Champ Car during a test for Rocketsports, his solitary race during 2006 came in Argentina's TC 2000 series. In 2007, Bernoldi competed in the Stock Car Brasil, competing in eleven of the twelve races and finishing 13th in the championship, with his best results being a pair of podium finishes.

=== IndyCar Series ===
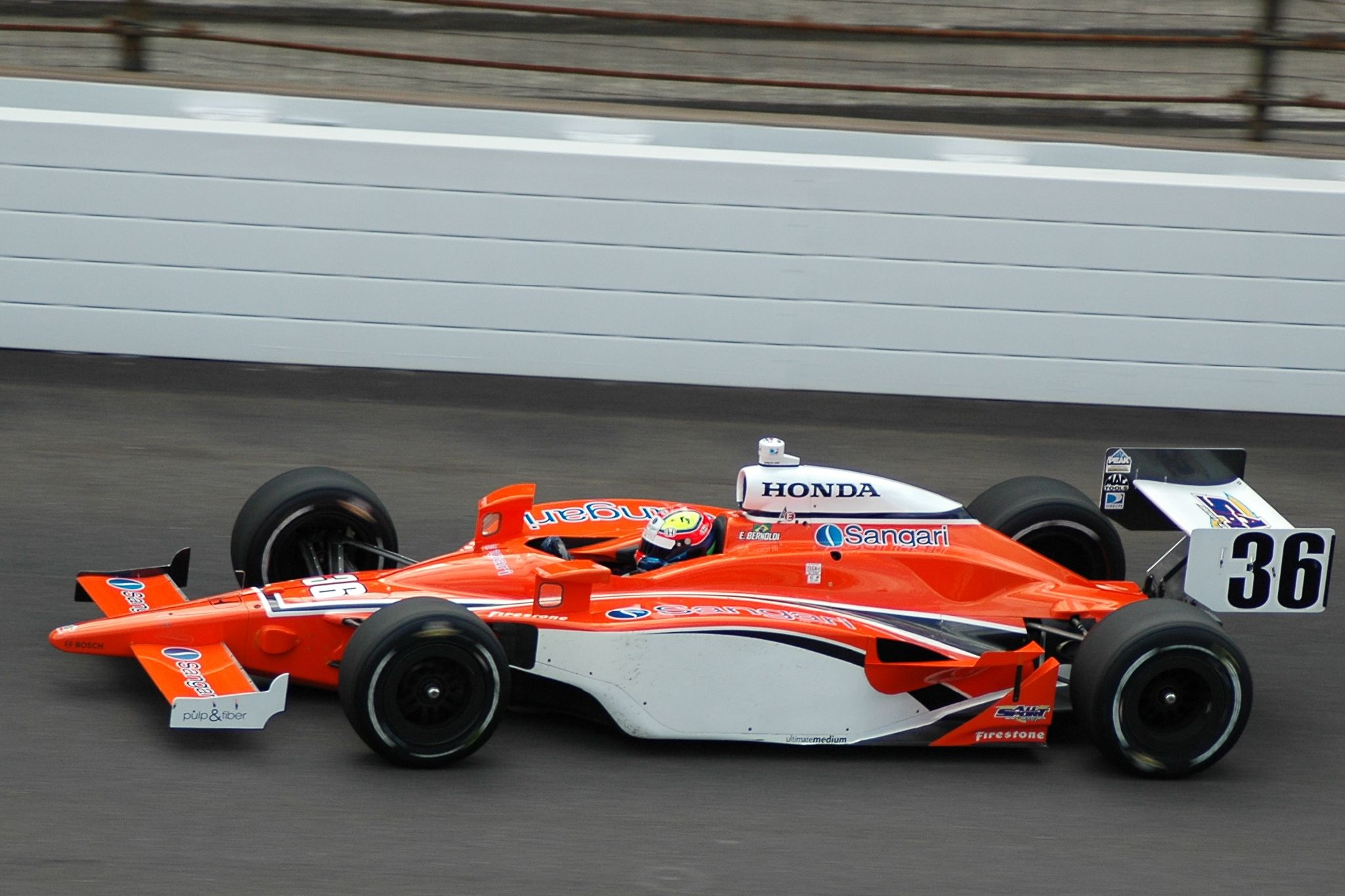
Bernoldi practicing for the 2008 Indianapolis 500

For 2008, Bernoldi signed a contract with Rocketsports for the 2008 Champ Car World Series. However, following the reunification of Champ Car and the Indy Racing League, Rocketsports withdrew, opting not to compete in the new, combined, series. It was later announced that Bernoldi would drive for Conquest Racing in the newly combined series' 2008 season. His best result was fourth, in the final Champ Car-sanctioned race at Long Beach. His best result in the reunified IndyCar Series was fifteenth at the 2008 Indianapolis 500. A collision with teammate Jamie Camara at Watkins Glen lead him to publicly criticize the team, and speculation that he might leave them. A thumb injury ruled him out of the final two races of the season, his seat being filled by Alex Tagliani.

=== 2009–present ===
For 2009, Bernoldi was the full-time driver of Flamengo in the Superleague open wheel series and also he ran a partial schedule in Stock Car Brasil. He also competed in the FIA GT Championship for Sangari Team Brazil, taking his first win at Paul Ricard.

In 2010, Bernoldi raced in the new FIA GT1 World Championship for Vitaphone Racing, scoring the pole position and winning his home race at Interlagos.

In 2011, Bernoldi continued to race in the series, campaigning a Nissan GT-R for the Sumo Power GT team. He also entered four races of the GT Brasil, driving for Ford GT Racing Team BMG.

In 2012, Bernoldi drove for Vita4One Team Italy in the Italian GT Championship, followed by appearances for AF Waltrip in the FIA World Endurance Championship, before making his debut in the International GT Open, driving once more for AF Corse in a Ferrari 458 GT2. He also made his debut in the SPEED EuroSeries, driving for Team JD in a Tatuus CN, whilst entering the 500 Milhas de Kart do Beto Carreiro at the end of the year. In 2013, he entered the International Challenge of the Stars, run by Felipe Massa. Bernoldi retired from motor sport in 2015.

== Personal life ==
Bernoldi's son Bernardo "Beco" Bernoldi is also a racing driver.

== Racing record ==
=== Career summary ===
Season	Series	Team	Races	Wins	Poles	Points	Position
1995	Formula Alfa Boxer	?	8	2	4	?	4th
1995	Championnat de France Formule Renault	?	1	0	1	?	NC
1995	Formula Renault Europe	?	1	1	?	32	11th
1996	Renault Spider Europe	Team Ghinzani	6	0	1	38	12th
1996	Championnat de France Formule Renault	?	4	2	1	?	NC
1996	Formula Renault Europe	Tatuus JD Motorsport	11	9	8	218	**1st**
1997	Macau Grand Prix	Promatecme	1	0	0	N/A	**3rd**
1997	Masters of Formula 3	Promatecme	1	0	0	N/A	NC
1997	British F3 Championship	Promatecme	14	1	0	127	5th
1998	Macau Grand Prix	Promatecme	1	1	1	N/A	**3rd**
1998	Masters of Formula 3	Promatecme	1	1	1	N/A	**2nd**
1998	British Formula 3 Championship	Promatecme	15	6	4	163	**2nd**
1999	Formula One	Sauber	Test driver				
1999	International Formula 3000 Championship	Red Bull Junior	8	0	0	2	18th
2000	Formula One	Sauber	Test driver				
2000	International Formula 3000 Championship	Red Bull Junior	10	0	1	5	16th
2001	Formula One	Arrows	17	0	0	0	21st
2002	Formula One	Arrows	11	0	0	0	22nd
2003	World Series by Nissan	GD Racing	18	2	2	112	6th
2004	World Series by Nissan	GD Racing	18	2	2	113	**3rd**
2004	Formula One	British American Racing	Test driver				
2005	Formula One	British American Racing	Test driver				
2006	Formula One	Honda F1	Test driver				
2006	TC 2000	Honda Petrobras Lubrax	1	0	0	0	NC
2007	Stock Car Brasil	Biosintética	11	0	1	58	13th
2008	IndyCar Series	Conquest Racing	15	0	0	220	22nd
2009	Stock Car Brasil	RCM Motorsport	4	0	0	1	30th
2009	FIA GT Championship	Sangari Team Brazil	5	1	1	25	11th
2009	Superleague Formula	CR Flamengo	10	0	0	191	16th
2010	FIA GT1 World Championship	Vitaphone Racing Team	20	1	1	53	15th
2011	Itaipava GT3 Brasil	Ford GT Racing Team BMG	4	0	0	35	19th
2011	FIA GT1 World Championship	Sumo Power GT	20	0	0	64	12th
2012	FIA World Endurance Championship	AF Corse-Waltrip	1	0	1	0	N/A
2012	Italian GT Championship - GT3	Vita4One Team Italy	2	0	0	18	19th
2014	Stock Car Brasil	C2 Team	1	0	0	0	NC
2015	Stock Car Brasil	C2 Team	1	0	0	0	NC

=== Complete British Formula Three Championship results ===
(key) (Races in bold indicate pole position; races in italics indicate fastest lap.)

Year	Entrant	Chassis	Engine	Class	1	2	3	4	5	6	7	8	9	10	11	12	13	14	15	16	DC	Points
1997	Promatecme	Dallara F397	Renault	A	DON; 3	SIL	THR	BRH; 14	SIL; 6	CRO; 5	OUL; Ret	SIL; 10	PEM; 8	PEM; 2	DON; 8	SNE; 2	SNE; 3	SPA; 1	SIL; 2	THR; 3	5th	127
1998	Promatecme UK	Dallara F398	Renault Sodemo	A	**DON**; 1	THR; 1	SIL; 2	BRH; 1	BRH; Ret	**OUL**; 1	**SIL**; 1	CRO; Ret	SNE; Ret	SIL; Ret	PEM; 4	PEM; 7	DON; 1	THR; Ret	SPA; 4	**SIL**; Ret	2nd	163

=== Complete International Formula 3000 results ===
(key) (Races in bold indicate pole position; races in italics indicate fastest lap.)

Year	Entrant	1	2	3	4	5	6	7	8	9	10	DC	Points
1999	Red Bull Junior	IMO; 9	MON; 15	CAT; Ret	MAG; 12	SIL; 20	A1R; Ret	HOC; 5	HUN; 8	SPA; DNQ	NÜR; DNQ	18th	2
2000	Red Bull Junior	IMO; Ret	SIL; 4	**CAT**; Ret	NÜR; Ret	MON; Ret	MAG; 23	A1R; 14	HOC; 6	HUN; 6	SPA; 10	16th	5

=== Complete Formula One results ===
(key)

Year	Entrant	Chassis	Engine	1	2	3	4	5	6	7	8	9	10	11	12	13	14	15	16	17	WDC	Points
2001	Orange Arrows Asiatech	Arrows A22	Asiatech V10	AUS; Ret	MAL; Ret	BRA; Ret	SMR; 10	ESP; Ret	AUT; Ret	MON; 9	CAN; Ret	EUR; Ret	FRA; Ret	GBR; 14	GER; 8	HUN; Ret	BEL; 12	ITA; Ret	USA; 13	JPN; 14	21st	0
2002	Orange Arrows	Arrows A23	Cosworth V10	AUS; DSQ	MAL; Ret	BRA; Ret	SMR; Ret	ESP; Ret	AUT; Ret	MON; 12	CAN; Ret	EUR; 10	GBR; Ret	FRA; DNQ	GER; Ret	HUN	BEL	ITA	USA	JPN	22nd	0

=== Complete World Series by Nissan results ===
Year	Team	1	2	3	4	5	6	7	8	9	10	11	12	13	14	15	16	17	18	DC	Points
2003	RC Motorsport	JAR1; 1; 3	**JAR1**; **2**; 9																	6th	112
2003	GD Racing			ZOL; 1; 16†	ZOL; 2 Ret	MAG; 1 Ret	MAG; 2 Ret	MNZ; 1; 8	MNZ; 2 Ret	LAU; 1; 10	LAU; 2; 6	A1R; 1; 4	A1R; 2; 8	CAT; 1; 5	CAT; 2; 3	**VAL**; **1**; 1	VAL; 2; 8	**JAR2**; **1**; 1	JAR2; 2; 3	6th	112
2004	GD Racing	**JAR**; **1**; 1	**JAR**; **2**; 1	ZOL; 1; 2	ZOL; 2; 10	MAG; 1; 3	MAG; 2 Ret	VAL1; 1; 6	VAL1; 2; 4	LAU; 1; 2	LAU; 2; 3	EST; 1 Ret	EST; 2; 7	CAT; 1; 3	CAT; 2 Ret	VAL2; 1; 7	VAL2; 2; 6	JER; 1; 7	JER; 2 Ret	3rd	121

=== Complete Stock Car Brasil results ===
Year	Team	Car	1	2	3	4	5	6	7	8	9	10	11	12	13	14	15	16	17	18	19	20	21	Rank	Points
2007	Biosintetica Racing	Volkswagen Bora	INT; DNQ	CTB; 15	CGD; 22	INT; 25	LON; Ret	SCZ; 3	CTB; Ret	BSB; 3	ARG; 4	TAR; 30	RIO; 14	INT; 7										13th	58
2009	RCM Motorsport	Chevrolet Vectra	INT; 15	CTB; Ret	BSB; Ret	SCZ; DSQ	INT	SAL	RIO	CGD	CTB	BSB	TAR	INT										30th	1
2014	C2 Team	Chevrolet Sonic	INT; 1; 19	SCZ; 1	SCZ; 2	BRA; 1	BRA; 2	GOI; 1	GOI; 2	GOI; 1	CAS; 1	CAS; 2	CUR; 1	CUR; 2	VEL; 1	VEL; 2	SCZ; 1	SCZ; 2	TAR; 1	TAR; 2	SAL; 1	SAL; 2	CUR; 1	NC†	0†
2015	C2 Team	Chevrolet Sonic	GOI; 1; 20	RBP; 1	RBP; 2	VEL; 1	VEL; 2	CUR; 1	CUR; 2	SCZ; 1	SCZ; 2	CUR; 1	CUR; 2	GOI; 1	CAS; 1	CAS; 2	BRA; 1	BRA; 2	CUR; 1	CUR; 2	TAR; 1	TAR; 2	INT; 1	NC†	0†

† Ineligible for championship points.

=== American open–wheel racing results ===
(key) (Races in bold indicate pole position)

==== IndyCar ====
Year	Team	No.	1	2	3	4	5	6	7	8	9	10	11	12	13	14	15	16	17	18	19	Rank	Points	Ref
2008	Conquest Racing	36	HMS; 18	STP; 5	MOT^{1} DNP	LBH^{1} 4	KAN; 25	INDY; 15	MIL; 16	TXS; 23	IOW; 17	RIR; 26	WGL; 21	NSH; 20	MDO; 26	EDM; 16	KTY; 22	SNM; 21	DET; Wth	CHI	SRF^{2}	22nd	220	

^{1} Run on same day.
^{2} Non-points paying, exhibition race.

Years	Teams	Races	Poles	Wins	Podiums (Non-win)	Top 10s (Non-podium)	Indianapolis 500 Wins	Championships
1	1	15	0	0	0	2	0	0

=== Indy 500 results ===
Year	Chassis	Engine	Start	Finish	Team
2008	Dallara	Honda	29	15	Conquest

=== Complete Superleague Formula results ===
(Races in bold indicate pole position) (Races in italics indicate fastest lap)

Year	Team	1	2	3	4	5	6	7	8	9	10	11	12	Pos	Pts
2009	Flamengo Delta Motorsport	MAG; 1; 6	MAG; 2; 8	ZOL; 1; 7	ZOL; 2; 18	DON; 1; 18	**DON**; **2**; 14	EST; 1; 13	EST; 2; 3	MNZ; 1	MNZ; 2	JAR; 1; 11	JAR; 2; 12	16th	191

==== Super Final Results ====
Year	Team	1	2	3	4	5	6
2009	Flamengo Delta Motorsport	MAG; DNQ	ZOL; N/A	DON; DNQ	EST; DNQ	MNZ	JAR; DNQ

=== Complete GT1 World Championship results ===
Year	Team	Car	1	2	3	4	5	6	7	8	9	10	11	12	13	14	15	16	17	18	19	20	Pos	Points
2010	Vitaphone Racing Team	Maserati MC12 GT1	ABU; QR; Ret	ABU; CR; 6	SIL; QR; 9	SIL; CR; 15	BRN; QR; 7	BRN; CR; 6	PRI; QR; 5	PRI; CR; Ret	SPA; QR; 11	SPA; CR; 4	NÜR; QR; 7	NÜR; CR; 12	ALG; QR; 13	ALG; CR; Ret	NAV; QR; Ret	NAV; CR; 12	INT; QR; 4	INT; CR; 1	SAN; QR; 16	SAN; CR; 4	15th	53
2011	Sumo Power GT	Nissan GT-R GT1	ABU; QR; 4	ABU; CR; Ret	ZOL; QR; 12	ZOL; CR; Ret	ALG; QR; 8	ALG; CR; 7	SAC; QR; 4	SAC; CR; 4	SIL; QR; 4	SIL; CR; 7	NAV; QR; Ret	NAV; CR; 12	PRI; QR; 10	PRI; CR; 7	ORD; QR; 5	ORD; CR; Ret	BEI; QR; 10	BEI; CR; 6	SAN; QR; 4	SAN; CR; 4	12th	64

Sporting positions
Preceded by Cyrille Sauvage	Eurocup Formula Renault; Champion; 1996	Succeeded by Jeffrey van Hooydonk
