= Arrows A23 =

Formula One racing car

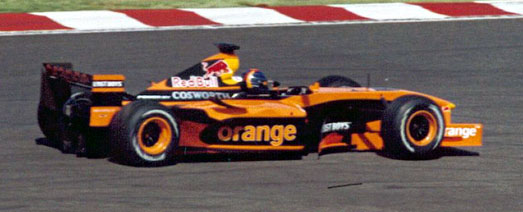
- Heinz-Harald Frentzen driving the A23 at the 2002 French Grand Prix
- Category: Formula One
- Constructor: Arrows
- Designers: Mike Coughlan (Technical Director); Sergio Rinland (Chief Designer); Mark Preston (Head of R&D); Nicolò Petrucci (Head of Aerodynamics)
- Predecessor: A22
- Successor: Minardi PS04/PS04B, Super Aguri SA05

Technical specifications
- Chassis: Carbon-fibre monocoque
- Suspension (front): Inboard pushrod operated independent suspension. Carbon fibre wishbones with double tether restraint system both front and rear
- Suspension (rear): As front
- Engine: Cosworth CR-3 3.0 litre V10 (72°) naturally-aspirated mid-engined
- Transmission: Arrows with Jaguar internals 7-speed longitudinal sequential semi-automatic
- Power: 805 hp @ 17,500 rpm
- Fuel: BP
- Lubricants: Castrol
- Tyres: Bridgestone

Competition history
- Notable entrants: Orange Arrows
- Notable drivers: 20. (Germany) Heinz-Harald Frentzen; 21. (Brazil) Enrique Bernoldi
- Debut: 2002 Australian Grand Prix
- Last event: 2002 German Grand Prix
Races	Wins	Poles	F/Laps
12	0	0	0
- Constructors' Championships: 0
- Drivers' Championships: 0

The Arrows A23 is a Formula One racing car, used by the Arrows team during the 2002 Formula One season. It was designed by Mike Coughlan, Sergio Rinland and Nicolò Petrucci with engines supplied by Jaguar-works Cosworth customer rather than the Asiatech unit used in the previous year's Arrows A22.

== Arrows racing history ==
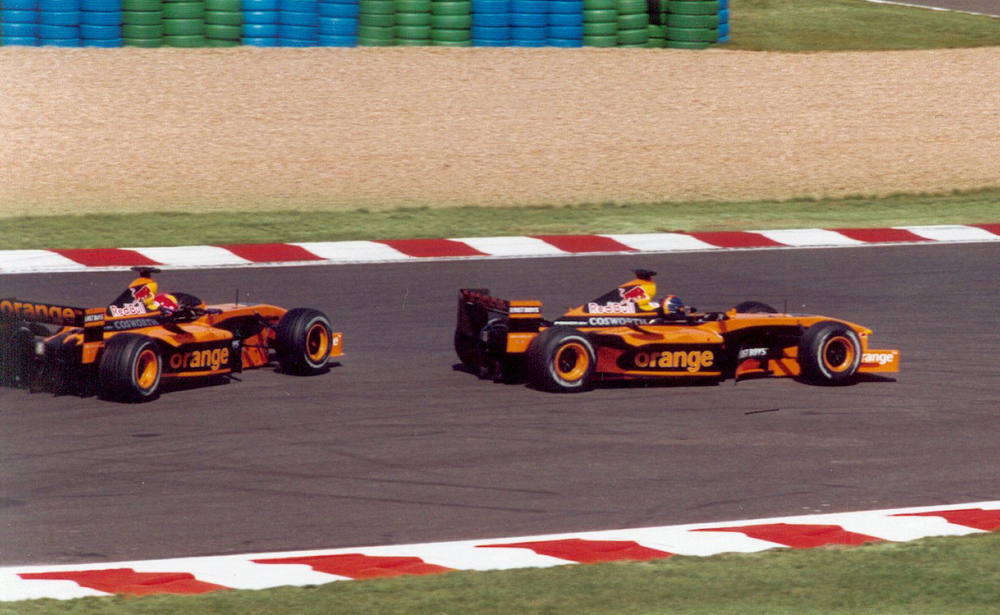
Heinz-Harald Frentzen and Enrique Bernoldi driving A23s at the 2002 French Grand Prix.

The car was completely designed around Jos Verstappen, who had a contract to race for the 2002 season. However, due to financial problems the team replaced him with Heinz-Harald Frentzen on a race by race deal because he could bring more sponsorship money. Rinland designed the car around the twin keel concept he had perfected at Sauber. The A23 was introduced late and had very little pre season testing as a result. Most of the testing and set up work was done by Verstappen before he was abruptly replaced by Frentzen.

Driven by Frentzen and Enrique Bernoldi, the car scored only two championship points. Both cars were disqualified at the opening race. Bernoldi grabbed headlines for taking the fight to Michael Schumacher in Malaysia, proving the A23's competitiveness. While the car had pace, reliability was again its achilles heel although Frentzen felt that the car had good potential however. Mounting debts and legal issues forced the team to pull out of Formula One following the 2002 German Grand Prix. Craig Pollock, who had just been ousted from BAR offered to buy the team, but terms could not be reached. Arrows and by extension TWR were declared insolvent shortly afterwards and folded.

The team's penultimate entry at the French Grand Prix saw both drivers deliberately fail to qualify as the team cut back on engine mileage and repair. On-board data acquisition showed the car to be quick in the first two sectors but noticeably slower in the third and final sector. The team's last actual entry was the following at the 2002 German Grand Prix at a new for 2002 heavily revised and shortened version of the Hockenheimring.

It was possible that Orange were due to terminate their sponsorship around the same time anyway due to making huge financial losses.

== Further use by other teams ==
=== Minardi ===
Following the demise of Arrows, the A23 chassis and intellectual property rights to them were bought by Paul Stoddart, then the head of the Minardi team, as a potential replacement for his own team's PS03 chassis.

The chassis was renamed the Minardi PS04, although it was largely unchanged from its condition as raced in the 2002 season. A comparison test next to the Minardi PS03 proved it to have similar performance to the PS03, but possibly more potential. However Minardi was worried about the negative PR from running a "pure-Arrows" and the decision was made to modify the PS03 using Arrows intellectual property and elements from the Arrows A23 for the 2004 season. The resulting car was called the Minardi PS04B.

=== Super Aguri ===
Four years later, in 2006, the new Super Aguri F1 team bought remaining unmodified A23 cars and from Minardi. Super Aguri ran them, with some minor modifications, as the Super Aguri SA05 during the first half of the 2006 season.

== Complete Formula One results ==
(key) (results in bold indicate pole position)

Year	Entrant	Engines	Tyres	Drivers	1	2	3	4	5	6	7	8	9	10	11	12	13	14	15	16	17	Points	WCC
2002	Orange Arrows	Cosworth V10	**B**		AUS	MAL	BRA	SMR	ESP	AUT	MON	CAN	EUR	GBR	FRA	GER	HUN	BEL	ITA	USA	JPN	**2**	**11th**
2002	Orange Arrows	Cosworth V10	**B**	(Germany) Heinz-Harald Frentzen	DSQ	11	Ret	Ret	6	11	6	13	13	Ret	DNQ	Ret						**2**	**11th**
2002	Orange Arrows	Cosworth V10	**B**	(Brazil) Enrique Bernoldi	DSQ	Ret	Ret	Ret	Ret	Ret	12	Ret	10	Ret	DNQ	Ret						**2**	**11th**
