= 2001 Malaysian Grand Prix =

Formula One motor race held in 2001

Coordinates: 2°45′39″N 101°44′18″E

Race 2 of 17 in the 2001 Formula One World Championship
← Previous race	Next race →

Race details
- Date: 18 March 2001
- Official name: 2001 Petronas Malaysian Grand Prix
- Location: Sepang International Circuit, Sepang, Selangor, Malaysia
- Course: Permanent racing facility
- Course length: 5.543 km (3.444 miles)
- Distance: 55 laps, 304.865 km (189.435 miles)
- Scheduled distance: 56 laps, 310.408 km (192.879 miles)
- Weather: Rain and Thunderstorms at start, dry later; Air Temp at start: 32 °C (90 °F)
- Attendance: 75,000

Pole position
Driver	(Germany) Michael Schumacher	Ferrari
- Time: 1:35.220

Fastest lap
Driver	(Finland) Mika Häkkinen	McLaren-Mercedes
- Time: 1:40.962 on lap 48

Podium
First	(Germany) Michael Schumacher	Ferrari
Second	(Brazil) Rubens Barrichello	Ferrari
Third	(United Kingdom) David Coulthard	McLaren-Mercedes

The 2001 Malaysian Grand Prix (officially the 2001 Petronas Malaysian Grand Prix) was a Formula One motor race held at the Sepang International Circuit in Sepang, Selangor, Malaysia in front of a crowd of 75,000 spectators on 18 March 2001. It was the second round of the 2001 Formula One World Championship and the third Formula One Malaysian Grand Prix. The race was won from pole position by Michael Schumacher, driving for Ferrari. His teammate Rubens Barrichello finished second and McLaren's David Coulthard was third.

After winning the preceding Australian Grand Prix, the first race of the season, Michael Schumacher was first in the World Drivers' Championship and his team Ferrari led the World Constructors' Championship. Michael Schumacher qualified on pole position by setting the fastest lap time in the one-hour qualifying session. The Grand Prix was delayed and shortened from 56 to 55 laps because Giancarlo Fisichella of the Benetton team was out of position on the starting grid. When it did start, Michael Schumacher led the first two laps until he and Barrichello skidded on oil left by Olivier Panis' British American Racing (BAR) car, as a tropical monsoon begin to fall. They ran into a gravel trap and Jordan driver Jarno Trulli took the lead for one lap until he and several drivers aquaplaned in the deteriorating weather. Coulthard led for 11 laps after a phase of pit stops for wet-weather tyres before Michael Schumacher passed him on lap 16. Schumacher led the remainder of the race to achieve his second victory of the season and the 46th of his career.

Michael Schumacher's victory was his sixth in succession from pole position, bettering a record jointly held by former world champions Nigel Mansell and Alberto Ascari. The result left him ten championship points clear of Barrichello and Coulthard, who were tied in second, in the World Drivers' Championship. Heinz-Harald Frentzen of Jordan moved past Sauber's Nick Heidfeld for fourth. In the World Constructors' Championship, Ferrari further extended its advantage over second-place McLaren while Sauber fell to fourth behind Jordan with fifteen races left in the season.

== Background ==
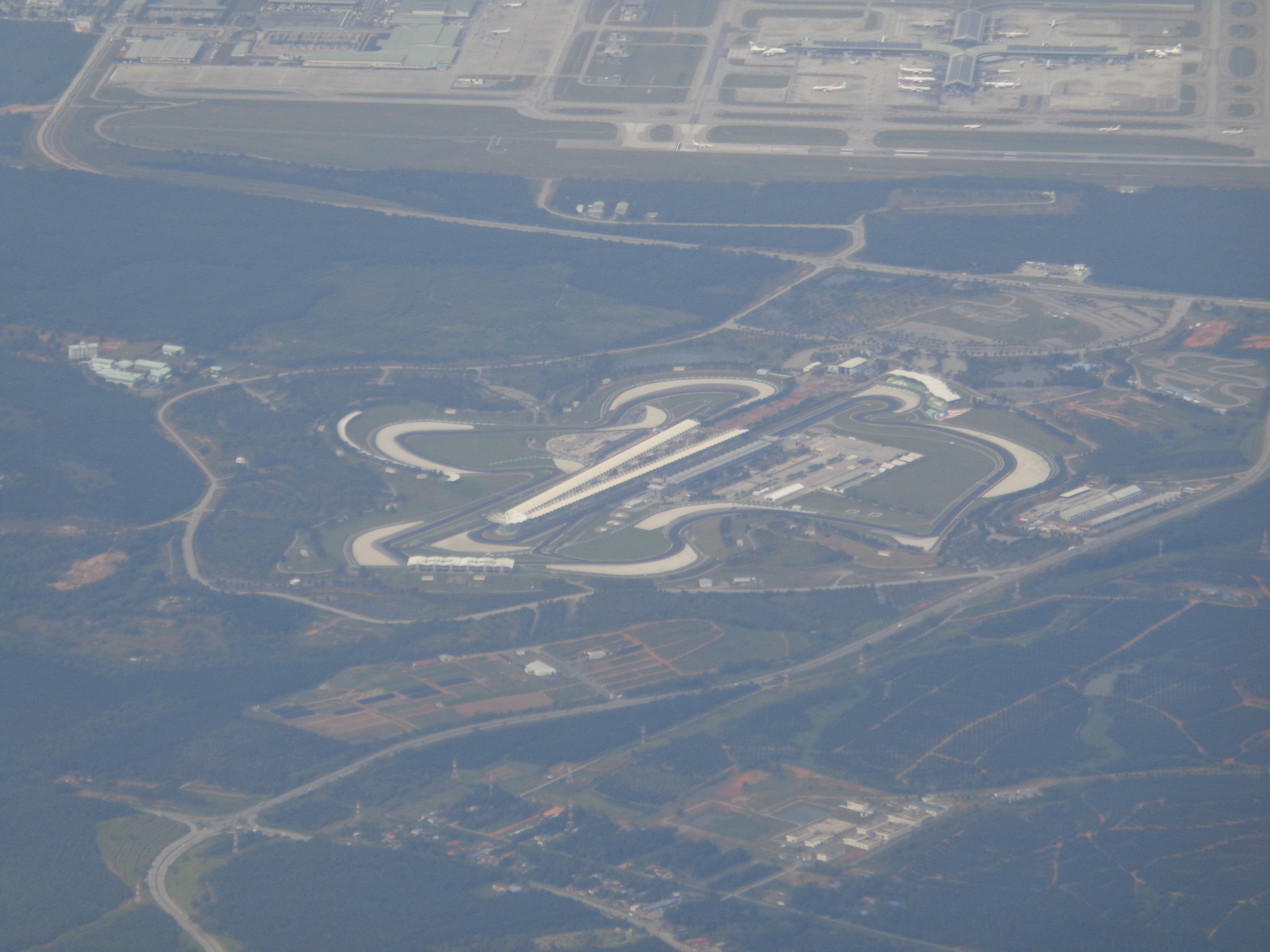
The Sepang International Circuit (pictured in 2016), where the race was held.

The 2001 Malaysian Grand Prix was the 2nd of the 17 races in the 2001 Formula One World Championship and the event's third running since its first Formula One race in 1999. It was held at the 15-turn 5.543 km (3.444 mi) Sepang International Circuit in Sepang, Selangor on 18 March, five months after the 2000 Grand Prix. A race sanctioned by the Fédération Internationale de l'Automobile (FIA), motorsport's governing body, had been held in Malaysia since the 1960s, with the first editions being run in Singapore, then part of the Malaysian Federation, before moving to the Shah Alam Circuit. With the arrival of the Formula One Grand Prix in 1999, the race was moved to the purpose-built Sepang International Circuit, where all editions were held until 2017.

After winning the season-opening Australian Grand Prix, Ferrari's Michael Schumacher led the World Drivers' Championship with ten championship points, ahead of McLaren's David Coulthard with six and Rubens Barrichello in the second Ferrari with four. Sauber's Nick Heidfeld was fourth with three championship points and Jordan's Heinz-Harald Frentzen was fifth on two championship points. In the World Constructors' Championship, Ferrari led with 14 championship points; McLaren were in second on six championship points. Sauber was in third place with four championship points and Jordan in fourth had two championship points.

The press and bookmakers considered Michael Schumacher the favourite to win the Malaysian Grand Prix, his team Ferrari had won every single running of the race up to that point: Eddie Irvine in 1999 and Schumacher in 2000. Some of the media attention focussed on the possibility of Michael Schumacher taking his sixth consecutive victory, which would have made him the first driver since the two-time world champion Alberto Ascari in 1952 to achieve the feat. He said he would not over relax after his victory in Melbourne: "Every year we say here at Ferrari that it is our best car ever and this time, like Rubens, I feel it is true. But we have experience and we know things can go up and down very quickly so we are not going to be complacent or over-confident. That is not our style."

Following the death of track marshal Graham Beveridge, who was struck in the chest by a wheel from the car of British American Racing (BAR) driver Jacques Villeneuve at the Australian Grand Prix, the organisers of the Malaysian race worked to better protect trackside personnel and drivers; they did not request assistance from Formula One officials. Circuit officials moved back the kerbs at turns five and six, and moved guard rails at turns two and 15 back by 2 m (6.6 ft). FIA race director and safety delegate Charlie Whiting approved both modifications. Safety marshals were urged by clerk of the course to be extra attentive while observing vehicles and to maintain care for fellow marshals. This came as executive director of the Malaysian Grand Prix and former driver Philippe Gurdjian presented a six-point advisory plan to all 700 circuit personnel including track marshals, firefighters and paramedics to improve safety.

There were 11 teams (each represented by a different constructor) fielded two race drivers for the event with no changes from the season entry list. All cars ran with the same rear wings as in Melbourne since the revised downforce regulations caused aerodynamicists to reclassify the Sepang International Circuit as a "high-downforce track". After competing the season's first round without a spare vehicle, half of the personnel working for the Minardi team returned to its bases in Italy and the United Kingdom to assemble, test and transport a spare car to Malaysia so that its drivers Fernando Alonso and Tarso Marques had a back-up plan if either one had a problem. Ferrari, McLaren and Benetton ran some aerodynamic modifications on their vehicles while Williams, Sauber, Prost, Arrows and Minardi all ran to the same specification as in Australia. McLaren installed larger brake cooling ducts to their MP4/16s and Jaguar on their R2s.

== Practice ==
There were four practice sessions preceding Sunday's race—two one-hour sessions on Friday, and two 45-minute sessions on Saturday. Conditions for the two Friday practice sessions were clear, hot and humid with several cars struggling for grip. Barrichello led the morning session with a 1:39.502 lap, 0.621 seconds faster than his teammate Michael Schumacher in second. Jordan driver Jarno Trulli, Coulthard, Irvine, Heinz Frentzen, McLaren's Mika Häkkinen, Olivier Panis for BAR, Jaguar's Luciano Burti and Heidfeld in positions three to ten. Williams driver Juan Pablo Montoya set no lap times due to a fuel pump failure and the Arrows car of Jos Verstappen stopped at turn three with an engine sensor fault. His teammate Enrique Bernoldi stopped at turn four with a clutch hydraulics problem about half a minute later.

In the afternoon session, Trulli recorded the day's fastest lap at 1:38.846. He was 0.083 seconds ahead of Michael Schumacher in second. Barrichello, Coulthard, Irvine, Häkkinen, Frentzen, Burti, Panis and Ralf Schumacher of the Williams team rounded out the session's top ten drivers. Early in the session, Frentzen confronted the Sauber team principal Peter Sauber, who was angered at comments made by the former regarding the fast acceleration of his team's vehicles exiting the corners in the Australian Grand Prix. Both engaged in a verbal argument, which was ended when Jordan team owner Eddie Jordan pulled Frentzen away from Peter Sauber. Battery problems sidelined Montoya and two fuel pump failures limited Alonso's running to the final 20 minutes. His teammate Marques had an engine problem and Benetton's Jenson Button set his first lap times after missing the first session due to an overheating gearbox.

It continued to be clear, hot and humid for the two Saturday morning practice sessions. With a time of 1:36.814, Coulthard was fastest in the third session, followed by Barrichello in second and his Ferrari teammate Michael Schumacher in third. Häkkinen, Ralf Schumacher, Heidfeld,. Frentzen, Montoya, Panis and Irvine were in positions four through ten. In the final session, Barrichello led with a lap of 1:36.188. Second was Ralf Schumacher and Häkkinen third. Fourth was Michael Schumacher, Coulthard fifth and Frentzen improved to sixth. Trulli, Irvine, Panis and Sauber's Kimi Räikkönen occupied seventh to tenth places. Benetton's Giancarlo Fisichella ran into a gravel trap beside the circuit and Alonso stopped with smoke billowing from the rear of his car because of debris accumulation overheating his engine.

== Qualifying ==
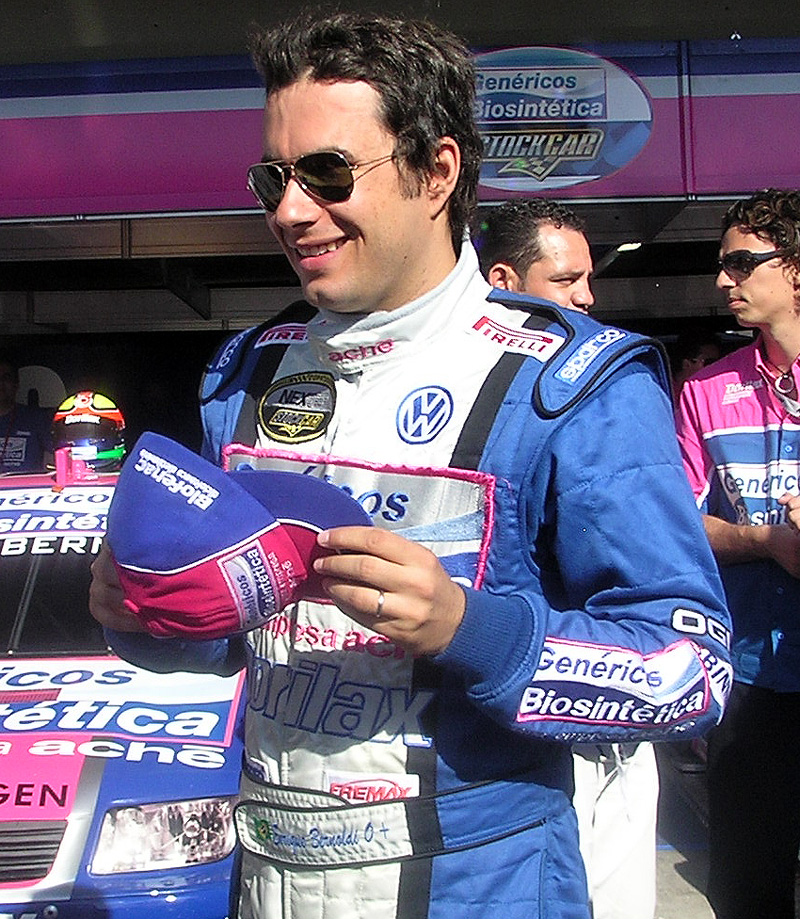
Enrique Bernoldi (pictured in 2007) had all of his lap times deleted because his Arrows A22 was found to have an illegal front wing and bodywork parts on the step plane.

Saturday afternoon's one-hour qualifying session saw each driver limited to twelve laps, with the grid order decided by each's fastest lap. During this session, the 107% rule was in effect, which necessitated each driver to set a time within 107 per cent of the quickest lap to qualify for the race. Weather conditions were hot and sunny. Michael Schumacher completed two timed laps with new tyres and another two on used front wheels; he lost two-tenths of a second on his first attempt. He took his sixth consecutive pole position—becoming the first driver since Häkkinen in 1999 to achieve the feat—and the 34th of his career with a time of 1:35.220. He was joined on the grid's front row by his teammate Barrichello who had lost time in the first two turns due to a strengthening wind. Ralf Schumacher initially led and traded pole position with both Ferrari drivers before falling to third. Häkkinen had a car balance problem that left him in fourth. Trulli in fifth had a lack of acclimatisation due to an electrical fault and could not fine-tune his car's setup. Montoya, sixth, spun during the session, as Villeneuve, who said later he thought he drove too aggressively, took seventh. Coulthard, eighth, admitted to over-driving in the middle sector during his final attempt, losing him time. Excess understeer put Frentzen, who took ninth, off the track. Panis in tenth lost four-tenths of a second on his last timed lap.

Heidfeld was the fastest driver not to qualify in the top ten after driving on worn tyres on his first two timed laps and new front tyres on his third. He was followed by Irvine in 12th, who had understeer going into the second corner and Villeneuve slowed him into the final corner. Jean Alesi was the faster of the two Prost cars in 13th and spoke of his belief that the team had made progress from its pre-season testing form. After a change of left-rear suspension wishbone, Räikkönen took 14th; he ran wide due to an understeer and was prevented from doing a fourth lap because he was called to the weighbridge. A light fuel road and a changed car balance put Burti 15th. Fisichella switched to the spare B201 car setup for his teammate Button due to a minor chassis technical issue on his race car and he took 16th. An oversteer in the fast-speed corners before a setup alteration to improve his car's balance put Button 17th. A lack of engine power and understeer left Verstappen in 18th. His teammate Bernoldi was blocked by Räikkönen on his final timed lap and was 19th. Gastón Mazzacane in the slower Prost car had his setup changed and improved his best time to go 20th-fastest. Understeer on Marques' first two attempts and setup improvements to correct it put him 21st. His teammate Alonso could not drive his race car because its gearbox and engine was replaced. He took the spare Minardi and was 22nd.

=== Penalties ===
31 minutes into qualifying, the stewards deleted all of Bernoldi's lap times because the FIA technical delegate discovered the dimension of the Arrows A22's front wing and parts of its bodywork lying on the step plane were less than a respective 100 mm (10 cm) and 50 mm (5.0 cm) above the plane of reference. The penalty promoted Mazzacane to 19th, Marques to 20th, Alonso to 21st and dropped Bernoldi to 22nd.

=== Qualifying classification ===
Pos	No.	Driver	Constructor	Lap	Gap	Grid
1	1	(Germany) Michael Schumacher	Ferrari	1:35.220	—	1
2	2	(Brazil) Rubens Barrichello	Ferrari	1:35.319	+0.099	2
3	5	(Germany) Ralf Schumacher	Williams-BMW	1:35.511	+0.291	3
4	3	(Finland) Mika Häkkinen	McLaren-Mercedes	1:36.040	+0.820	4
5	12	(Italy) Jarno Trulli	Jordan-Honda	1:36.180	+0.960	5
6	6	(Colombia) Juan Pablo Montoya	Williams-BMW	1:36.218	+0.998	6
7	10	(Canada) Jacques Villeneuve	BAR-Honda	1:36.397	+1.177	7
8	4	(United Kingdom) David Coulthard	McLaren-Mercedes	1:36.417	+1.197	8
9	11	(Germany) Heinz-Harald Frentzen	Jordan-Honda	1:36.578	+1.358	9
10	9	(France) Olivier Panis	BAR-Honda	1:36.681	+1.461	10
11	16	(Germany) Nick Heidfeld	Sauber-Petronas	1:36.913	+1.693	11
12	18	(United Kingdom) Eddie Irvine	Jaguar-Cosworth	1:37.140	+1.920	12
13	22	(France) Jean Alesi	Prost-Acer	1:37.406	+2.186	13
14	17	(Finland) Kimi Räikkönen	Sauber-Petronas	1:37.728	+2.508	14
15	19	(Brazil) Luciano Burti	Jaguar-Cosworth	1:38.035	+2.815	15
16	7	(Italy) Giancarlo Fisichella	Benetton-Renault	1:38.086	+2.866	16
17	8	(United Kingdom) Jenson Button	Benetton-Renault	1:38.258	+3.038	17
18	14	(Netherlands) Jos Verstappen	Arrows-Asiatech	1:38.509	+3.289	18
EX	15	(Brazil) Enrique Bernoldi	Arrows-Asiatech	1:38.708^{1}	+3.488	22
19	23	(Argentina) Gastón Mazzacane	Prost-Acer	1:39.006	+3.786	19
20	20	(Brazil) Tarso Marques	Minardi-European	1:39.714	+4.494	20
21	21	(Spain) Fernando Alonso	Minardi-European	1:40.249	+5.029	21
107% time: 1:41.885

Notes

- ^1 – Enrique Bernoldi's fastest time (1:38.708) was cancelled due to incorrect car dimensions.

== Warm-up ==
A 30-minute warm-up session was held on Sunday morning, in hot and humid weather and on a saturated track created by a tropical thunderstorm that ended around 30 minutes before the session began, prompting most teams run the intermediate tyres on their cars. A dry line appeared towards the session's end helped by warm temperatures and the top three runners set their fastest times this way. Barrichello was fastest with a lap of 1:49.763. He was followed by Coulthard, Trulli, Räikkonen, Verstappen, Frentzen, Michael Schumacher, Heidfeld, Panis and Villeneuve. Alonso stopped on the start/finish straight with a fuel pump failure and he took the spare car originally set up for his teammate Marques. Irvine's engine cut out, causing him to drive the spare Jaguar. Fisichella spun twice and his teammate Button was observed driving on the dry compound tyres for three laps towards the end of warm-up.

== Race ==
The race took place in the afternoon from 14:00 MST and in front of a crowd of 75,000 spectators. The weather at the start was overcast but hot and humid. The air temperature ranged from 32 to 33 °C (90 to 91 °F) and the track temperature 41 to 44 °C (106 to 111 °F); forecasts four days earlier predicted conditions to be consistent with sunny skies. Every driver, except for Burti, began on the dry soft compound tyres. Most teams had anticipated the possibility of rain but it was not much of a threat for them to make their cars suitable for wet-weather. Five minutes before the pit lane was officially closed, Michael Schumacher's race car had an oil leak, prompting him to drive the spare Ferrari that was set up for his teammate Barrichello. He avoided a pit lane start because he exited the area one minute before it closed.

On the formation lap, Frentzen's engine misfired due to a computer-hardware error that limited his rev limiter to 4,000 rpm as he drove away from his starting slot. Just before the race was due to start, Fisichella was out of position because he missed his starting slot and was stranded in the middle of the grid. He drove to his original starting position and was perpendicular across the track with not enough steering lock and rolled between the two cars ahead and behind him. Because series regulations barred drivers from reversing, this resulted in an aborted start. A new start time of 14:10 MST was planned and the race was shortened from 56 to 55 laps over a distance of 304.865 km (189.434 mi) since drivers were required to do a second formation lap. During this lap Montoya ran to his garage to take the spare vehicle because his race car had an engine problem.

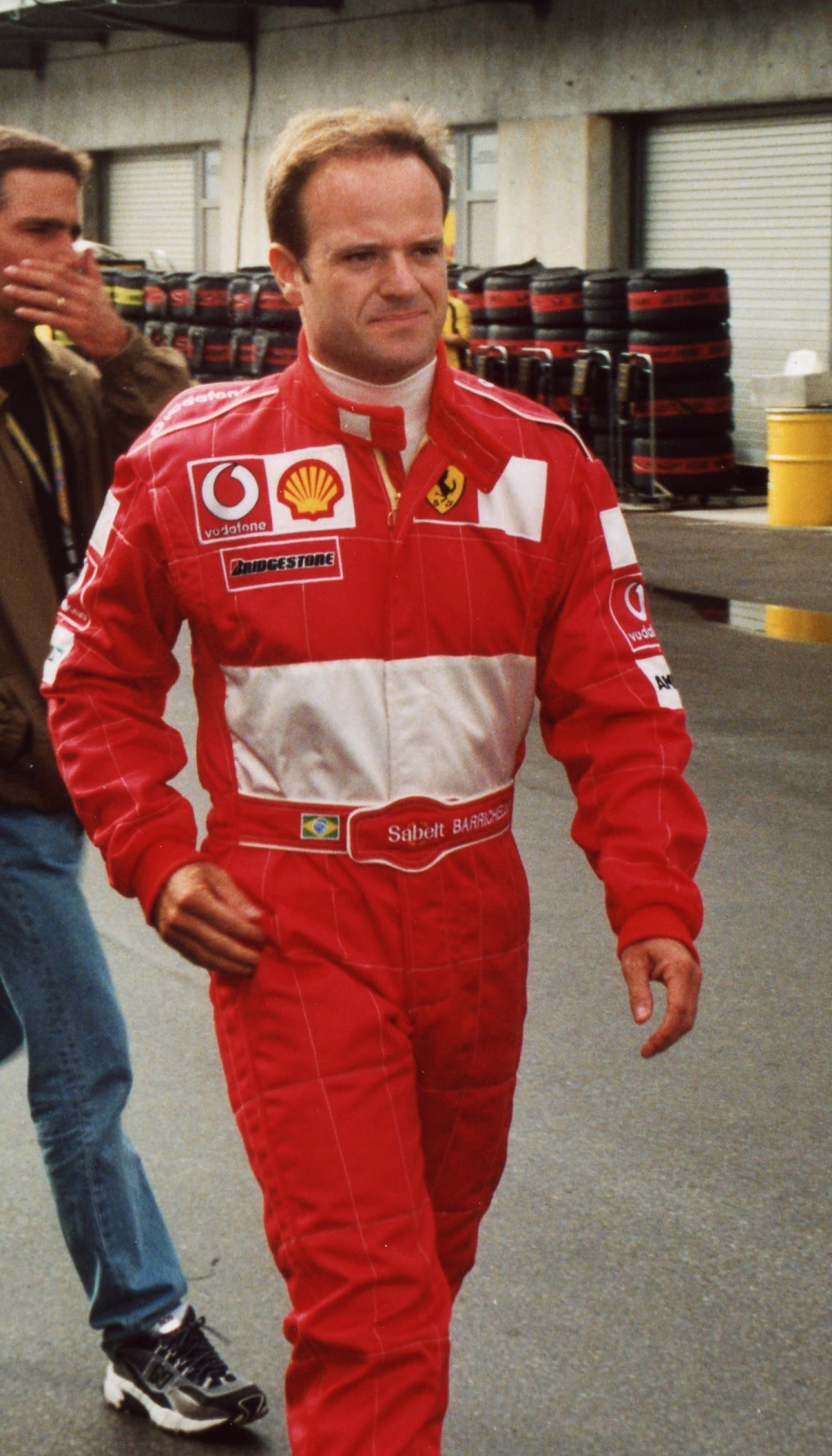
Rubens Barrichello (pictured in 2002), who finished in second, had a 72-second pit stop due to a tyre mix-up early in the race.

Michael Schumacher, from the pole position, made a brisk getaway to maintain his startline advantage going into the first corner. His teammate Barrichello made a slow start and fell from second to fourth as Trulli was to the left of him and Ralf Schumacher to his right. Ralf Schumacher slid before turn one and he defended his position at the corner. That caused the left-front corner of Barrichello's Ferrari and the rear of Ralf Schumacher's Williams car to connect; Schumacher spun 180 degrees in front of the pack and smoke emitted from his tyres, sending him to the rear of the field as other drivers went past. In doing so, Irvine was sent into a half-spin by Verstappen as Räikkönen drove near the pit lane wall with a broken transmission. Elsewhere, Häkkinen slowed to avoid piling into Ralf Schumacher. He fell from fourth to eighth as his teammate Coulthard moved from eighth to fourth after going into the grass to avoid the incidents. Verstappen moved from 18th to sixth by the end of the first lap by driving on the inside, as Ralf Schumacher fell from third to 20th over the same distance. At the end of the first lap, Michael Schumacher led his teammate Barrichello in second by 1.3 seconds, with Trulli a further 1.8 seconds behind in third.

As the two Ferraris pulled away from the rest of the field midway on lap two, Panis' engine failed and flames licked from the car, pitching him backwards into the gravel trap. Leaking oil pooled on the track and dripped onto his hot exhaust, where it ignited. Fisichella overtook his teammate Button for 11th as Ralf Schumacher moved from 20th to 14th. An unexpected monsoon shower began to fall on lap three. The two Ferraris continued to pull further away from the rest of the field, although they were unaware of Panis' deposited oil because they had not been told of it in time by the marshals. Both drivers slid on the oil and into the gravel trap, and navigated back onto the track in third and seventh. Trulli took the lead with Coulthard in second. None of the leaders made pit stops to switch to wet-weather compound tyres immediately because half of the track was dry while the final hairpin was flooded as some areas did not have adequate drainage. On lap four, Montoya, Bernoldi, Heidfeld and Villeneuve aquaplaned into a gravel trap and retired. Whiting deployed the safety car on the lap though several cars, including Trulli, Coulthard and Barrichello, aquaplaned into the turn 15 hairpin. In all, six drivers ran off the circuit and four retired because of the weather conditions.

During the safety car period, several drivers made pit stops for rain tyres. Although he had no radio communication with his team, Coulthard exited the pit lane leading while Ferrari had a fraught stop. Barrichello's second error and Michael Schumacher being three seconds behind on the lap before meant Ferrari believed that the latter was ahead, After Ferrari technical director Ross Brawn called both Michael Schumacher and his teammate Barrichello for their first pit stops, the team were caught out. Schumacher sat behind Barrichello for 1 minute and 12 seconds because Ferrari were missing Barrichello's front-right wheel since Brawn mistakenly told the mechanics that Schumacher was ahead; debris also had to be removed from Barrichello's bargeboard that was removed. The duo emerged in 10th and 11th. Rain stopped falling by lap seven although there was a large amount of standing water as the safety car remained on track for the next three laps. The track dried quickly and the safety car was withdrawn at the end of lap 10. Coulthard led from Frentzen and Verstappen at the lap-11 restart. He began to pull away from the rest of the field as Verstappen slipstreamed Frentzen on the back straight and out-braked him for second at the turn 15 hairpin. On lap 12, Frenzten fell to fifth when Häkkinen and Ralf Schumacher passed him. Barrichello radioed Brawn about dirt on the track and that his teammate Michael Schumacher should take care. During the lap, Schumacher, on a light fuel load and whose engine almost overheated in the pit lane, went onto the dirt to pass Barrichello, who went to the left of Trulli at the right-handed turn five and was blocked by him.

Michael Schumacher overtook Frentzen, Ralf Schumacher and Häkkinen off the racing line on the 13th lap. He approached Verstappen in second on the next lap though Verstappen twice blocked his path. Further back, his teammate Barrichello passed Ralf Schumacher and Häkkinen took fourth. On the 15th lap, Michael Schumacher overtook Verstappen on the inside for second and began to draw closer to Coulthard, who drove with an understeer. He passed Coulthard on the right for the lead on the start/finish straight linking the final and first corners on lap 16. That lap, Barrichello overtook Verstappen and Coulthard to advance to second as Michael Schumacher began to pull away by five seconds as those on full wet tyres were dealing with high degregation. It appeared at this point that Ferrari would win the race comfortably barring a mechanical issue. Häkkinen and Ralf Schumacher were the first two drivers to enter the pit lane and switch from the full wet compound tyres to the dry compound tyres on lap 17. Barrichello made his second stop four laps later in which the second bargeboard was removed from his car, emerging in fourth. Coulthard fell to 40 seconds behind the Ferraris by the time of his second stop on lap 25. He rejoined the race in third, more than 20 seconds behind Barrichello.

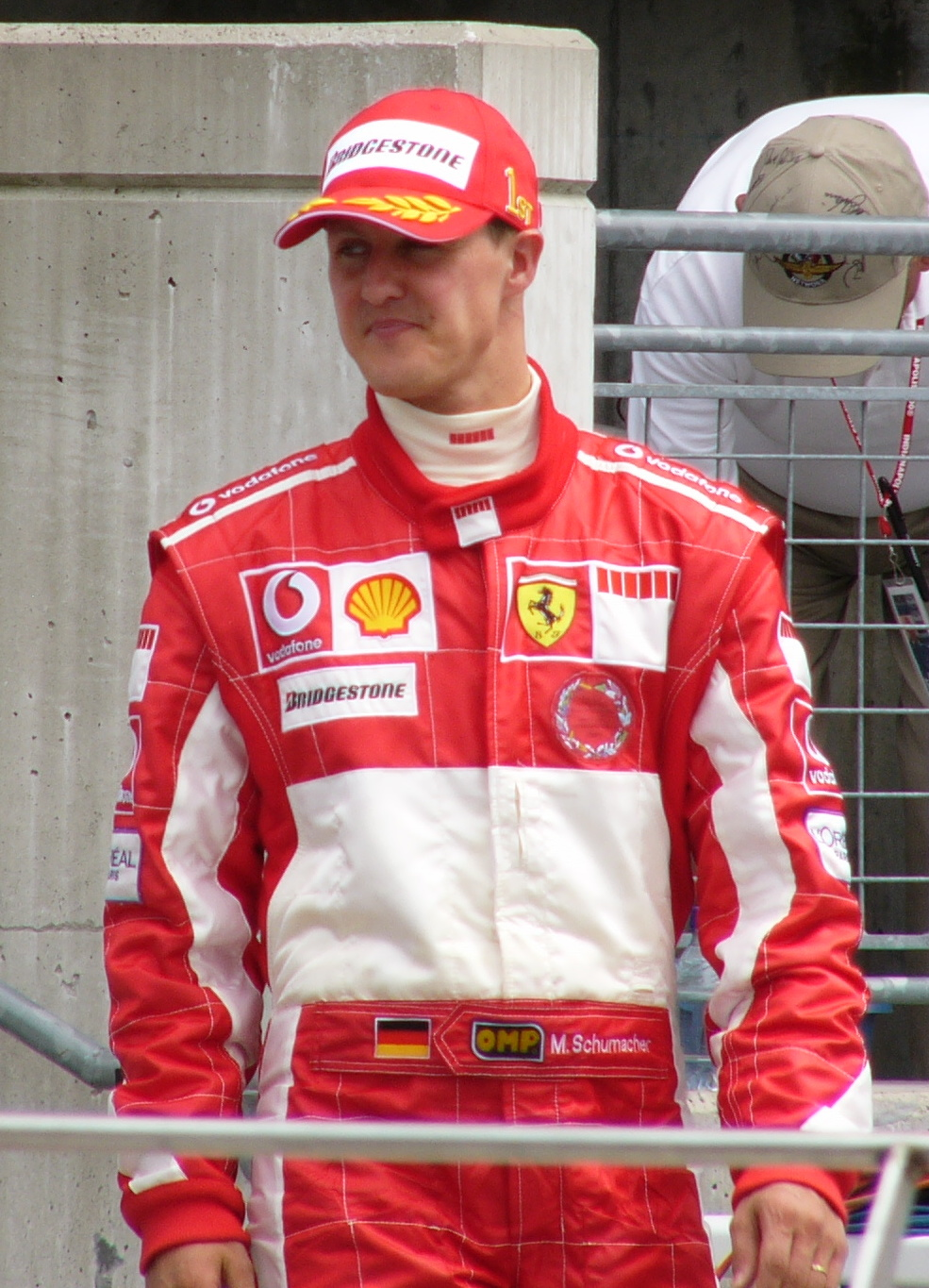
Michael Schumacher (pictured in 2005) led the majority of the race to better Nigel Mansell and Alberto Ascari's joint record of five victories in a row from pole position with his sixth.

In the meantime, Ralf Schumacher overtook Frentzen for fifth on lap 24 and Häkkinen for fourth four laps later. On lap 27 Mazzacane delayed Häkkinen and Verstappen, who were in the act of lapping him. When Häkkinen got past, Button followed through for 14th after being previously unable to overtake Mazzacane. Light rain began to fall again on lap 28 though it was not heavy enough to affect the race. Michael Schumacher led by 67 seconds when he made his second pit stop on lap 30 for a front wing adjustment and fuel to complete the race. He rejoined 28 seconds ahead of his teammate Barrichello in second. Further back, Verstappen lost fourth to Ralf Schumacher on lap 31. Fisichella in ninth became the race's final retiree with no fuel pressure at the pit lane entrance the lap after. Around this time, Häkkinen duelled Verstappen for fifth though he could not pass and allowed Frentzen to gain on the pair. Verstappen defended fifth by out-braking Häkkinen at the turn 15 hairpin on lap 38; the manoeuvre put Häkkinen wide and allowed Frentzen to overtake him for sixth. Barrichello made his final pit stop three laps later and he remained in second. Verstappen entered the pit lane for the third time on the 43rd lap to take on enough fuel to complete the race.

The track was entirely dry by lap 47 as Coulthard lowered the deficit behind Barrichello to 4.5 seconds. One lap later, Häkkinen set the race's overall fastest lap, at 1:40.962, as he pursued Ralf Schumacher in fifth. However, he did not have enough traction exiting the corners to pass Ralf Schumacher, whose more powerful engine gave him a straight-line speed advantage on the main straights, but emitted a large amount of carbon brake dust each time he braked into the heavy braking zones. Michael Schumacher reduced his pace since overtaking caused by blocked radiators was a possible worry for him but maintained the lead to take his second victory of the season, and the 46th of his career, overtaking Nigel Mansell's and Ascari's joint record of five victories in a row from pole position with his sixth. Barrichello was 23.660 seconds behind in second and Coulthard came third. Frentzen's scheduled two-stop strategy put him fourth despite locking rear wheels and was ordered by Jordan to stop at the end of the pit lane barrier because he needed to have enough fuel in his car to pass a post-race FIA analysis. Ralf Schumacher in fifth held off Häkkinen in sixth. Outside of the points-scoring positions, Verstappen, Trulli, Alesi, Burti, Button and Mazzacane followed in positions seven to twelve. The Minardi cars were the final two finishers, Alonso ahead of Marques; the latter was delayed by a right-rear puncture.

=== Post-race ===
The top three drivers appeared on the podium to collect their trophies and spoke to the media in a later press conference. Michael Schumacher called the race "exciting" and said it reminded him of his victory at the 1996 Spanish Grand Prix, "It was probably the same story, but honestly it's great being somehow dominant, but we know that won't be the case for every coming race now. It was special conditions, special circumstances, and we used them well for us." Barrichello said that he made an extra pit stop to have debris removed from his car, adding, "I think we have a good car, a fantastic car actually, the best car I have ever driven, like I have said. Once I came on the radio to say that I saw some bits of the car flying, and that's basically was some of the barge boards and maybe the brake duct or something." Coulthard stated he was unsurprised at Ferrari's faster speed, "They clearly have a car advantage at this time, very similar to the sort of advantage we probably had in '98, and that allows you, if you make the right calls, to really drive at the pace you want to relative to others. So it's quite clear to everyone that they're the class of the field at the moment and we have a lot of work to do to catch up."

Ralf Schumacher said he felt the first lap collision with Barrichello prevented him from finishing on the podium and noted it was the second collision the latter had with a German driver in the past two races, "He should learn the rules. It is a racing accident but it difficult to understand how it happened because the car in front usually has the priority in the corner." Barrichello argued that Ralf Schumacher had not provided him with enough space to negotiate through, "If he comes around the outside, he leaves some room for a line. But I had no room or line and I had to let the car roll. He was in front and suddenly he shut the door and that was where we touched." Ron Dennis, the McLaren team principal, said he was certain the decision to run his cars on the wet tyres was correct, "Are we disappointed? Not really, but we are more frustrated. Today was one of those days when you have to make a decision and we made ours to go on wets and they (Ferrari) took a risk and went on intermediates." Brawn stated Ferrari had information from testing at the Fiorano Circuit that the intermediate tyres operated efficiently in deep standing water, "We knew there were dry parts of the track and we knew there were wet parts of the track and we knew the tyres were very good in the morning [warm-up] as well. That was what we ran this morning. We knew it was very good and we knew it would go into the dry."

Irvine described the weather conditions that were observed early in the race as "worse than Spa proportions, the rain was of Suzuka proportions – just like the weather at the race in Japan in 1995." Villeneuve said that "It was just undriveable in those conditions. It was a big downpour. I couldn't see anything and what made it more dangerous was that everyone was on dry tyres and did not have their red lights on." Verstappen said that although he was disappointed to score no championship points he was still pleased, "It was great to play with the big boys. It showed all the F1 teams that I can drive. You need equipment to win races, and I think that if I had the right equipment, I could do it."

Fisichella apologised to the Benetton team over the radio for missing his starting position that led to the start being aborted. He said that he was focused on ensuring his car was set up to his liking and only saw the vehicle ahead of him. The Benetton team principal Flavio Briatore did not reprimand Fisichella, but praised him for moving to seventh place before retiring. The result extended Michael Schumacher's lead in the World Drivers' Championship to 10 championship points over Barrichello and Coulthard, tied for second place. Frentzen moved past his compatriot Heidfeld for fourth. In the World Constructors' Championship, Ferrari further increased their advantage over McLaren to 19 championship points while Jordan passed Sauber for third and Williams in fifth registered their first championship points of the season with Ralf Schumacher's fifth-place finish with fifteen races left in the season.

=== Race classification ===
Drivers who scored championship points are denoted in bold.

Pos	No.	Driver	Constructor	Tyre	Laps	Time/Retired	Grid	Points
1	1	(Germany) **Michael Schumacher**	**Ferrari**	B	55	1:47:34.801	1	10
2	2	(Brazil) **Rubens Barrichello**	**Ferrari**	B	55	+ 23.660	2	6
3	4	(United Kingdom) **David Coulthard**	**McLaren-Mercedes**	B	55	+ 28.555	8	4
4	11	(Germany) **Heinz-Harald Frentzen**	**Jordan-Honda**	B	55	+ 46.543	9	3
5	5	(Germany) **Ralf Schumacher**	**Williams-BMW**	M	55	+ 48.233	3	2
6	3	(Finland) **Mika Häkkinen**	**McLaren-Mercedes**	B	55	+ 48.606	4	1
7	14	(Netherlands) Jos Verstappen	Arrows-Asiatech	B	55	+ 1:21.560	18	
8	12	(Italy) Jarno Trulli	Jordan-Honda	B	54	+ 1 Lap	5	
9	22	(France) Jean Alesi	Prost-Acer	M	54	+ 1 Lap	13	
10	19	(Brazil) Luciano Burti	Jaguar-Cosworth	M	54	+ 1 Lap	15	
11	8	(United Kingdom) Jenson Button	Benetton-Renault	M	53	+ 2 Laps	17	
12	23	(Argentina) Gastón Mazzacane	Prost-Acer	M	53	+ 2 Laps	19	
13	21	(Spain) Fernando Alonso	Minardi-European	M	52	+ 3 Laps	21	
14	20	(Brazil) Tarso Marques	Minardi-European	M	51	+ 4 Laps	20	
Ret	7	(Italy) Giancarlo Fisichella	Benetton-Renault	M	31	Fuel pressure	16	
Ret	10	(Canada) Jacques Villeneuve	BAR-Honda	B	3	Spun off	7	
Ret	16	(Germany) Nick Heidfeld	Sauber-Petronas	B	3	Spun off	11	
Ret	15	(Brazil) Enrique Bernoldi	Arrows-Asiatech	B	3	Spun off	22	
Ret	6	(Colombia) Juan Pablo Montoya	Williams-BMW	M	3	Spun off	PL^{2}	
Ret	18	(United Kingdom) Eddie Irvine	Jaguar-Cosworth	M	3	Water leak	12	
Ret	9	(France) Olivier Panis	BAR-Honda	B	1	Engine/Spun off	10	
Ret	17	(Finland) Kimi Räikkönen	Sauber-Petronas	B	0	Driveshaft	14	

Notes

- **^2** – Juan Pablo Montoya started the race from the pit lane.

== Championship standings after the race ==
Drivers' Championship standings

+/–	Pos	Driver	Points
	1	(Germany) Michael Schumacher	20
1	2	(Brazil) Rubens Barrichello	10
1	3	(United Kingdom) David Coulthard	10
1	4	(Germany) Heinz-Harald Frentzen	5
1	5	(Germany) Nick Heidfeld	3

Constructors' Championship standings

+/–	Pos	Constructor	Points
	1	(Italy) Ferrari	30
	2	(United Kingdom) McLaren-Mercedes	11
1	3	(Republic of Ireland) Jordan-Honda	5
1	4	(Switzerland) Sauber-Petronas	4
6	5	(United Kingdom) Williams-BMW	2
Sources:

- Note: Only the top five positions are included for both sets of standings.

Previous race: 2001 Australian Grand Prix	FIA Formula One World Championship; 2001 season	Next race: 2001 Brazilian Grand Prix
Previous race: 2000 Malaysian Grand Prix	Malaysian Grand Prix	Next race: 2002 Malaysian Grand Prix
