= 2001 Australian Grand Prix =

664th Formula 1 Championship Grand Prix

Coordinates: 37°50′59″S 144°58′06″E

Race 1 of 17 in the 2001 Formula One World Championship
| ← Previous race | Next race → |

Race details
- Date: 4 March 2001
- Official name: 2001 Qantas Australian Grand Prix
- Location: Albert Park Circuit, Albert Park, Melbourne, Victoria, Australia
- Course: Temporary street circuit
- Course length: 5.303 km (3.295 miles)
- Distance: 58 laps, 307.574 km (191.118 miles)
- Weather: Cloudy, sunny later
- Attendance: 128,500

Pole position
| Driver | (Germany) Michael Schumacher | Ferrari |
- Time: 1:26.892

Fastest lap
| Driver | (Germany) Michael Schumacher | Ferrari |
- Time: 1:28.214 on lap 34

Podium
| First | (Germany) Michael Schumacher | Ferrari |
| Second | (United Kingdom) David Coulthard | McLaren-Mercedes |
| Third | (Brazil) Rubens Barrichello | Ferrari |

The 2001 Australian Grand Prix (officially the 2001 Qantas Australian Grand Prix) was a Formula One motor race held on 4 March 2001 at the Albert Park Circuit in Albert Park, Melbourne, Victoria, Australia, before a crowd of 128,500 people. It was the first round of the 2001 Formula One World Championship and the 16th Australian Grand Prix that counted towards the Formula One World Championship. Ferrari driver Michael Schumacher won the 58-lap race from pole position. David Coulthard of the McLaren team finished second and Schumacher's teammate Rubens Barrichello third. It was Schumacher's fifth consecutive victory in Formula One and the 45th of his career.

Michael Schumacher won the 33rd pole position of his career by recording the fastest lap in qualifying. He maintained the lead until a major accident on lap five involving Williams' Ralf Schumacher and British American Racing (BAR) driver Jacques Villeneuve resulted in the death of spectator marshal Graham Beveridge, who was struck in the chest by Villeneuve's right-rear wheel. The incident necessitated deploying the safety car. The race restarted eleven laps later with Michael Schumacher in first place until the pit stop phase for fuel and tyres. Coulthard led for three laps until his stop before Michael Schumacher regained the lead which he maintained to win the race.

Graham Beveridge was the second marshal to die from injuries sustained during a Formula One race after Paolo Gislimberti at the 2000 Italian Grand Prix just under six months before. His death was investigated by the sport's governing body, the Fédération Internationale de l'Automobile (FIA), who concluded it was a "freak accident". A coroner's report concluded the organisers of the race, the Australian Grand Prix Corporation, were responsible for the accident and it was "avoidable".

Following this, Michael Schumacher left Australia as the leader of the World Drivers' Championship with ten championship points. Coulthard was four championship points behind in second and Barrichello a further two adrift in third. Nick Heidfeld of Sauber and Jordan's Heinz-Harald Frentzen were fourth and fifth. In the World Constructors' Championship, Ferrari led with fourteen championship points and McLaren were second with eight championship points. Sauber and Jordan followed in third and fourth with sixteen races left in the season.

== Background ==
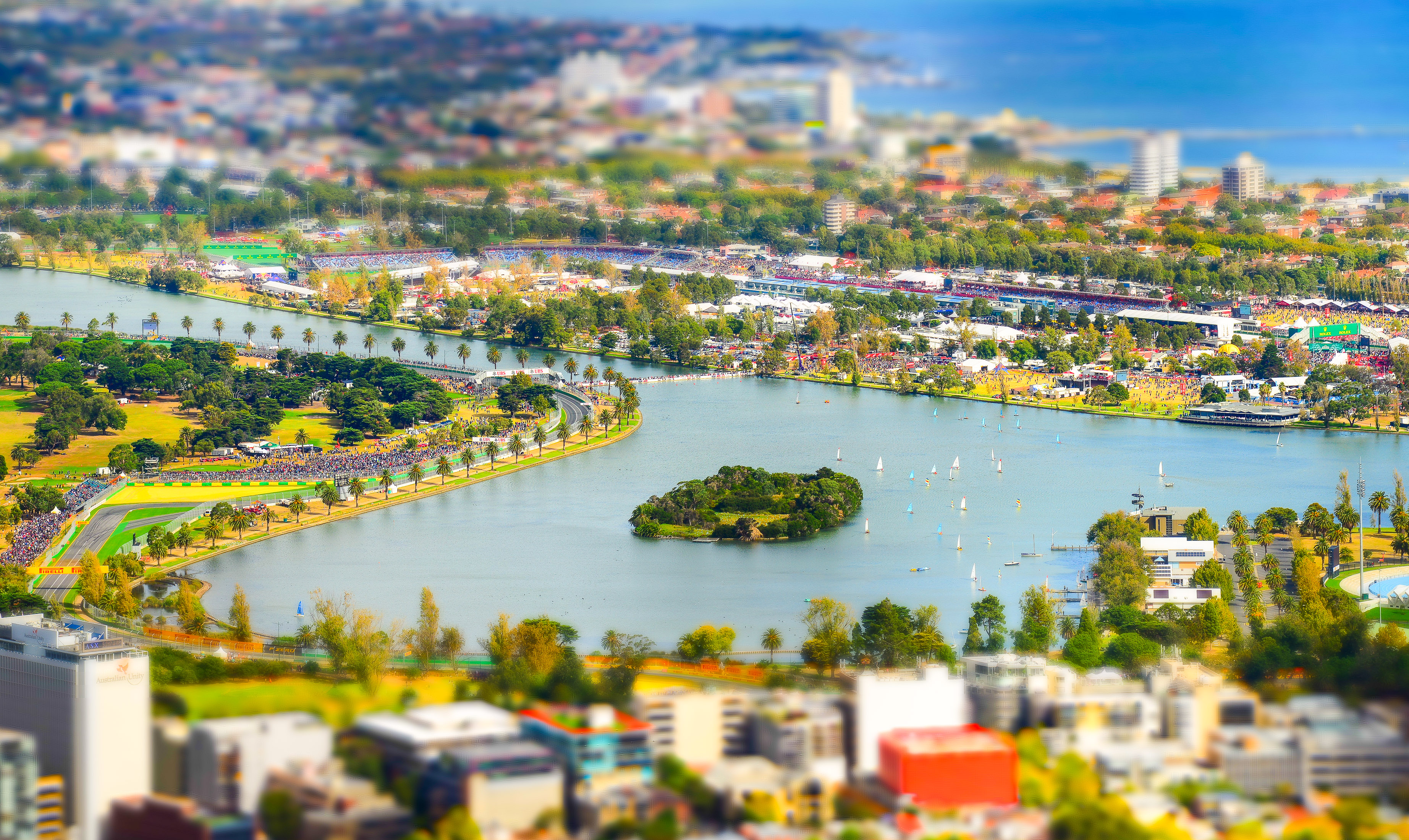
The Albert Park Circuit (pictured in 2014), where the race was held.

The 2001 Australian Grand Prix was the first of the 17 rounds in the 2001 Formula One World Championship and the 16th Formula One Australian race. It took place on 4 March at the 16-turn 5.303 km (3.295 mi) Albert Park Circuit in the Melbourne suburb of Albert Park, Victoria. The track is a semi-permanent road course. Due to the dust laid on it by road traffic all year round, it offers drivers a low amount of grip. Engineers set up the cars to extract the maximum amount of downforce at the rear and to be stable in high-speed corners. This puts a strain on traction and braking and prompted teams to install cooling devices on the brakes' rotor and calipers.

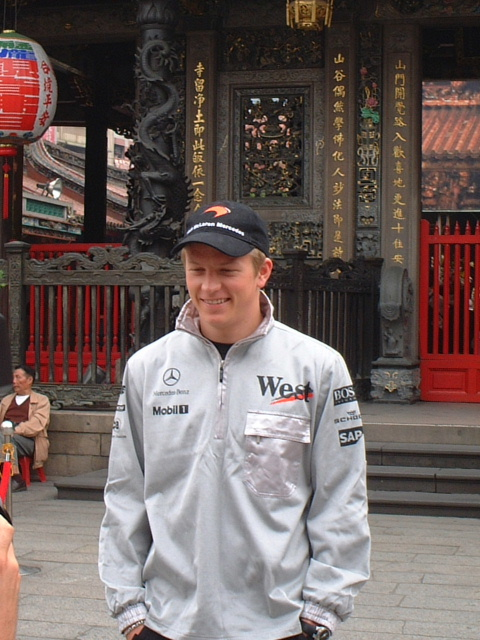
Kimi Räikkönen (pictured in McLaren overalls in 2002) was one of four drivers to make their Formula One debut in Melbourne.

Of the 22 drivers on the starting grid, four made their debut. The 1999 Championship Auto Racing Teams (CART) champion and 2000 Indianapolis 500 winner Juan Pablo Montoya joined the Williams team to partner Ralf Schumacher, replacing Jenson Button, who was loaned to the Benetton team on a two-year deal. At the Arrows team, International Formula 3000 (IF3000) participant Enrique Bernoldi replaced Pedro de la Rosa, who lost his race seat and joined the Prost team as test and reserve driver. IF3000 driver Fernando Alonso was promoted from a test driver role at Minardi to a race seat. Kimi Räikkönen, the 2000 Formula Renault 2.0 UK champion, drove for the Sauber team in Melbourne, partnering Nick Heidfeld. Many observers, including Jaguar's Eddie Irvine, Button and the president of the Fédération Internationale de l'Automobile (FIA; Formula One's governing body), Max Mosley, criticised Sauber's choice to sign Räikkönen because he had competed in 23 car races prior to his debut and no F1 experience. He took part in a test session at the Circuito de Jerez before 25 FIA commission members for performance analysis in December 2000. Räikkönen was granted a super licence by a vote of 24 to 1 at a FIA World Motor Sport Council meeting on 7 December.

At the front of the field, the press considered the 2000 champion Michael Schumacher of Ferrari the favourite to take his fourth World Drivers' Championship. Mika Häkkinen of the McLaren team was predicted to be his nearest challenger. Michael Schumacher arrived with the physiological advantage as Ferrari exceeded its target of completing more than 4,000 km (2,500 mi) in pre-season testing. He said he was confident about his chances in Australia: "The F2001 has behaved very well from the first to last day of testing. It has performed brilliantly at Fiorano and Mugello. I can say again that never before have I been able to carry out such a preparation in my career and that sends me to Melbourne full of confidence." Häkkinen said the pressure he felt at the start of 2000 increased his desire to win the World Drivers' and Constructors' Championships in 2001 and intended to do his best to help McLaren achieve both titles.

The race saw the return of Michelin as a tyre supplier for the first time since the 1984 season; the company supplied tyres to the Williams, Benetton, Prost, Jaguar and Minardi teams in 2001. They provided Formula One's existing tyre supplier Bridgestone with competition for the first time since Goodyear left following the 1998 season. The competition led to the development of a tyre where more of its surface area came into contact with the road surface providing the driver with more grip. This increased the top speeds of cars during pre-season testing and drivers set lap times below 2000-levels to nullify the effect of the reduction in aerodynamic performance and downforce. It raised concerns within the sport about grooved compounds becoming illegal slick tyres; the FIA declined to enforce a regulation mandating Michelin and Bridgestone to restrict the wear of their tyre compounds.

Several teams introduced major changes to their cars compared to the models shown at the official presentations and pre-season testing. Ferrari introduced multiple aerodynamic appendages, with the most conspicuous being fins mounted on the external side section. The team also fitted revised air intakes onto the brakes for improved cooling and air flow deviation around the wheels. The Williams squad vertical bulkheads under the front wing by using the 50 mm (2.0 in) within the wing to allow it to run lower to the ground.

== Practice ==
A total of four practice sessions preceded Sunday's race—two one-hour sessions on Friday and two 45-minute sessions on Saturday. The Friday practice sessions were held in hot and clear weather. In the morning session, Ferrari's Rubens Barrichello was fastest with a lap of 1 minute 29.056 seconds, 0.312 seconds quicker than his teammate Michael Schumacher in second. The two McLarens were third and fourth—Häkkinen ahead of David Coulthard. Ralf Schumacher, Jos Verstappen of the Arrows team, Jordan's Heinz-Harald Frentzen, Montoya, Heidfeld and British American Racing (BAR) driver Olivier Panis were in positions five to ten. While the session was relatively uneventful, Ralf Schumacher and his teammate Montoya ran off the circuit; both drivers avoided sustaining damage to their cars.

Barrichello set the day's fastest lap in the afternoon session at 1 minute 28.965 seconds. Jarno Trulli for Jordan, Michael Schumacher, Coulthard, Häkkinen, Ralf Schumacher, Heidfeld, Frentzen, Prost's Jean Alesi and Panis followed in positions two to ten. Tarso Marques' engine failed after seven minutes and laid oil on the track. Both Irvine and Button sustained separate punctures. Red flags were shown after 35 minutes when Jaguar's Luciano Burti locked his tyres into the first corner and spun. He damaged the front-left corner of his Jaguar R2 car in an impact with a concrete barrier at the corner's exit. Burti was unhurt. Frentzen beached his car in the turn six gravel trap with six minutes remaining, and Heidfeld damaged his front wing in an off-track excursion.

Shortly after, Michael Schumacher did not see waved yellow flags in turn five to alert drivers to Heidfeld. He accelerated and saw the yellow flags in the braking area for turn six. Schumacher lost control of the rear of the car on oil laid on the approach to the right-hand turn six while braking. He spun backwards after hitting the inside kerb and speared into the gravel trap at 120 mph (190 km/h). The wheels dug into a ridge in the gravel on the outside of the turn and the Ferrari lifted airborne. Schumacher somersaulted and barrel rolled twice before landing upright against a tyre barrier. He was unhurt, and he returned to the area later that day to discuss possible changes to turn six after raising concerns the day before.

In the third session, Michael Schumacher was fastest in his rebuilt car with a lap of 1 minute 28.134 seconds. The McLarens of Coulthard and Häkkinen were second and third. Trulli was fourth-fastest with Jacques Villeneuve of BAR fifth and his teammate Panis sixth. Frentzen, Barrichello, Montoya and Irvine followed in the top ten. Barrichello stopped at the side of the track with an engine failure and Verstappen was affected by a transmission fault caused by an electrical problem. Frentzen spun late in the session and avoided damaging his car. Coulthard led the final session with a lap of 1 minute 27.540 seconds, followed by Michael Schumacher, Häkkinen, Frentzen, Trulli, Panis, Räikkönen, Irvine and Heidfeld. A brake problem caused Marques to spin into the gravel trap and Michael Schumacher stopped at turn six with debris in his left-front brake duct.

== Qualifying ==
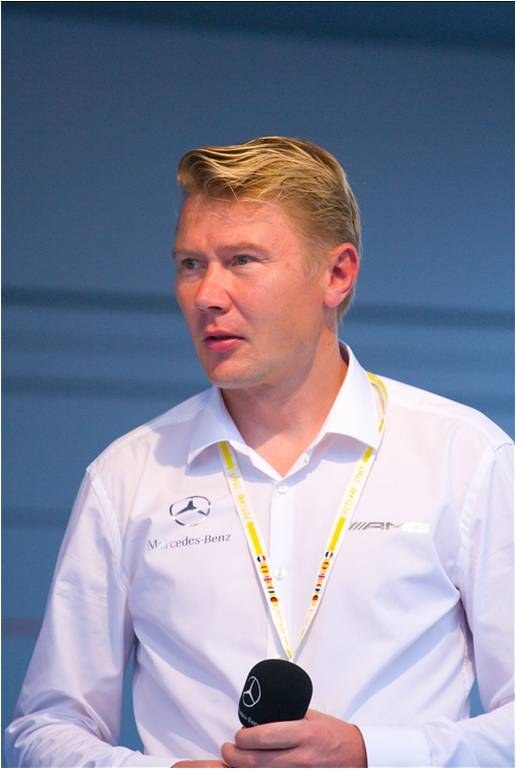
Mika Häkkinen (pictured as a Mercedes-Benz brand ambassador in 2009) was the leading McLaren driver on the starting grid.

Saturday's afternoon one hour qualifying session saw each driver limited to twelve laps, with the grid order decided by their fastest laps. During this session, the 107% rule was in effect, which required each driver to set a time within 107 per cent of the quickest lap to qualify for the race. The weather was hot and clear. After a front camber angle alteration, Michael Schumacher took his fifth pole position in a row extending back to the 2000 Italian Grand Prix, and the 33rd of his career with a time of 1 minute 26.892 seconds, almost four seconds faster than Häkkinen's pole lap from the 2000 race. Barrichello in second negotiated slower traffic on his fastest lap; he aborted one lap due to a gear selection fault and was ordered to stop on the weighbridge. Häkkinen, who had pole position early on, had balance problems putting him off the track at a bumpy turn one and took third. Frentzen, fourth, was confident in the feel of his Jordan EJ11 car, ahead of Ralf Schumacher in fifth, the highest-placed Michelin-shod car. Coulthard, in sixth, twice ran onto the grass due to car balance problems. Trulli started from seventh, bemoaning a deteriorating handling balance. Villeneuve took eighth place, ahead of his BAR teammate Panis in ninth; both drivers reported an adequate car balance. Villeneuve collided with Montoya in an attempt to pass him on the inside, necessitating a bargeboard replacement. Heidfeld in tenth was twice slowed by traffic.

Montoya was the fastest driver not to qualify in the top ten; Bernoldi slowed Montoya leaving turn four and put him wide on his final timed lap. Irvine, in his balanced and slightly heavy Jaguar, set the 12th-fastest lap as debris removed one of his bargeboards. Räikkönen was the highest-placed rookie driver in 13th, as he drove an unbalanced Sauber—a problem his team could not resolve. Alesi was the faster of the two Prost cars in 14th, as Verstappen's transmission fault prevented him from setting up his car to achieve an optimal performance and was 15th. Button did not have his preferred qualifying setup following a gearbox change earlier in the day and was 16th. His teammate Fisichella was 17th due to a water leak in his car prompting him to switch to the team's spare car, which had a braking problem. Bernoldi, 18th, failed to generate sufficient heat into the front tyres on his car with traffic slowing him. Alonso set the 19th-fastest time in his first Formula One qualifying session; he lost around half a second through an error. A strong understeer left Prost's Gastón Mazzacane in 20th. Burti in 21st had a left-rear suspension failure sending him into a retaining wall at turn five, stopping the session for 12 minutes to allow track marshals to clear debris. Occupying the last spot on the grid, Marques failed to set a lap time within the 107 per cent limit due to his unfamiliarity with the Minardi PS01's two-pedal setup. He spun at turn three before driving Alonso's race car. Minardi appealed to the stewards and Marques was granted permission to start the race under "exceptional circumstances."

=== Qualifying classification ===
| Pos | No. | Driver | Constructor | Lap | Gap | Grid |
|---|---|---|---|---|---|---|
| 1 | 1 | (Germany) Michael Schumacher | Ferrari | 1:26.892 | — | 1 |
| 2 | 2 | (Brazil) Rubens Barrichello | Ferrari | 1:27.263 | +0.371 | 2 |
| 3 | 3 | (Finland) Mika Häkkinen | McLaren-Mercedes | 1:27.461 | +0.569 | 3 |
| 4 | 11 | (Germany) Heinz-Harald Frentzen | Jordan-Honda | 1:27.658 | +0.766 | 4 |
| 5 | 5 | (Germany) Ralf Schumacher | Williams-BMW | 1:27.719 | +0.827 | 5 |
| 6 | 4 | (United Kingdom) David Coulthard | McLaren-Mercedes | 1:28.010 | +1.118 | 6 |
| 7 | 12 | (Italy) Jarno Trulli | Jordan-Honda | 1:28.377 | +1.485 | 7 |
| 8 | 10 | (Canada) Jacques Villeneuve | BAR-Honda | 1:28.435 | +1.543 | 8 |
| 9 | 9 | (France) Olivier Panis | BAR-Honda | 1:28.518 | +1.626 | 9 |
| 10 | 16 | (Germany) Nick Heidfeld | Sauber-Petronas | 1:28.615 | +1.723 | 10 |
| 11 | 6 | (Colombia) Juan Pablo Montoya | Williams-BMW | 1:28.738 | +1.846 | 11 |
| 12 | 18 | (United Kingdom) Eddie Irvine | Jaguar-Cosworth | 1:28.965 | +2.073 | 12 |
| 13 | 17 | (Finland) Kimi Räikkönen | Sauber-Petronas | 1:28.993 | +2.101 | 13 |
| 14 | 22 | (France) Jean Alesi | Prost-Acer | 1:29.893 | +3.001 | 14 |
| 15 | 14 | (Netherlands) Jos Verstappen | Arrows-Asiatech | 1:29.934 | +3.042 | 15 |
| 16 | 8 | (United Kingdom) Jenson Button | Benetton-Renault | 1:30.035 | +3.143 | 16 |
| 17 | 7 | (Italy) Giancarlo Fisichella | Benetton-Renault | 1:30.209 | +3.317 | 17 |
| 18 | 15 | (Brazil) Enrique Bernoldi | Arrows-Asiatech | 1:30.520 | +3.628 | 18 |
| 19 | 21 | (Spain) Fernando Alonso | Minardi-European | 1:30.657 | +3.765 | 19 |
| 20 | 23 | (Argentina) Gastón Mazzacane | Prost-Acer | 1:30.798 | +3.906 | 20 |
| 21 | 19 | (Brazil) Luciano Burti | Jaguar-Cosworth | 1:30.978 | +4.086 | 21 |
107% time: 1:32.974
| 22 | 20 | (Brazil) Tarso Marques | Minardi-European | 1:33.228 | +6.336^{1} | 22 |

Notes

- ^1 – Tarso Marques set a lap time outside the 107% limit, but he was allowed to start the race.

== Warm-up ==
A 30-minute warm-up session took place on Sunday morning for teams to set up their cars before the race. It was held in overcast weather with spots of rain that made the track moderately slippery. While he was briefly kept in the garage with a suspected engine oil leak, Coulthard led the session with a lap of 1 minute 30.099 seconds, 0.053 seconds quicker than his teammate Häkkinen in second. Verstappen was fastest for the opening 20 minutes before falling to third. Montoya, Panis, Michael Schumacher, Heidfeld, Irvine, Barrichello and Frentzen followed in positions four to ten. After exiting the pit lane at the beginning of the warm-up, Bernoldi lost control of the rear of his Arrows and removed the nose cone from his car in a collision with the turn one wall.

== Race ==
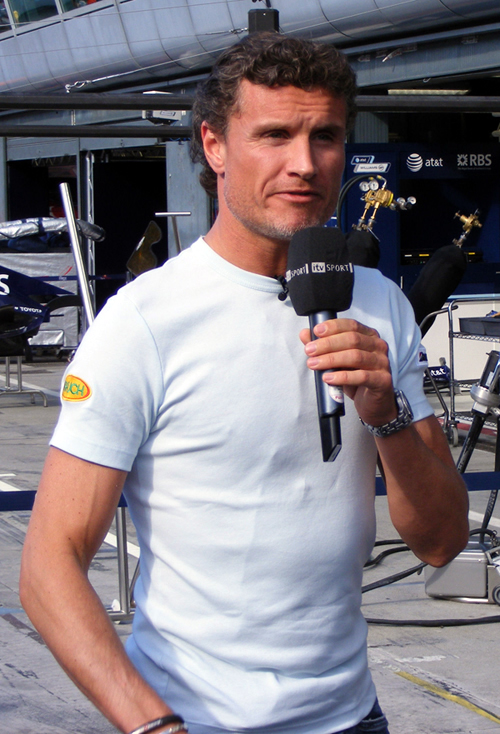
David Coulthard (pictured in 2007) finished in second place for McLaren.

The race took place before a crowd of 128,500 spectators at 14:00 local time. It lasted 58 laps over a distance of 307.574 km (191.118 mi). The weather was dry and overcast with the air temperature between 22 and 23 °C (72 and 73 °F); the track temperature ranged from 27 to 28 °C (81 to 82 °F); forecasts predicted heavy cloud cover with high humidity and no rainfall. Tyre durability and grooved tread wear were predicted to affect the race and analysis suggested one pit stop was the ideal strategy for drivers and teams. Jaguar isolated and fixed a minor vehicle design fault linked to Burti's accident in Saturday's qualifying session. They strengthened the double wishbone suspension on all three of their cars overnight. Irvine switched to the spare Jaguar due to a power steering failure on his race monocoque. Button used the spare Benetton; his mechanics remained on the grid to work on the car before the formation lap began, entailing an investigation by the race stewards resulting in Button incurring a ten-second stop-and-go penalty.

When the five red lights went out to start the race, Michael Schumacher made a brisk getaway to lead going into the first corner. Barrichello in second made a slower start and allowed a pack of cars to approach. Coulthard, on the right-portion, steered to the middle to try and hold off Ralf Schumacher on his left and Frentzen to his right. As the available space was reduced going into the turn one braking area, Frentzen hit the right-hand sidepod of Coulthard's car sending him towards Ralf Schumacher's Williams. He made a second, harder contact that slowed Coulthard. Behind the first five drivers, Montoya made up five positions before the end of the start/finish straight. He carried too much momentum and drove off the track at turn one. Montoya lost several positions and almost made contact with Panis as he rejoined the track. Entering turn three, Montoya attempted to pass Irvine on the outside and the two cars collided, sending the Jaguar into the grass and a 180-degree spin. Mazzacane retired with a broken brake pedal and an engine failure.

At the conclusion of lap one, Michael Schumacher led Häkkinen by 1.2 seconds and was a further second ahead of Frentzen in third. Barrichello challenged Ralf Schumacher for fourth and took the position when the latter ran deep under braking at turn one and fell to seventh. That enabled Coulthard to return to fifth as he had earlier passed Trulli. On lap two, Bernoldi became the race's second retiree when he lost control of his car exiting turn two and struck the left-hand barrier. Barrichello recorded an early fastest lap as he moved closer to attempt to pass Frentzen for third. On lap three, Barrichello attempted a pass on the right of Frentzen (who was on the racing line at the time) at turn nine, and the two made contact. Frentzen was sent into the grass; he avoided stalling his engine and rejoined the track in 16th. Barrichello continued in third albeit the toe-in on his front-left wheel was knocked out of alignment. Further down the order, the lightly fuelled Verstappen overtook Panis and Heidfeld to move into ninth on the same lap. Marques then joined the list of retirees with a progressively worsening battery misfire causing the engine to shut down on lap four.

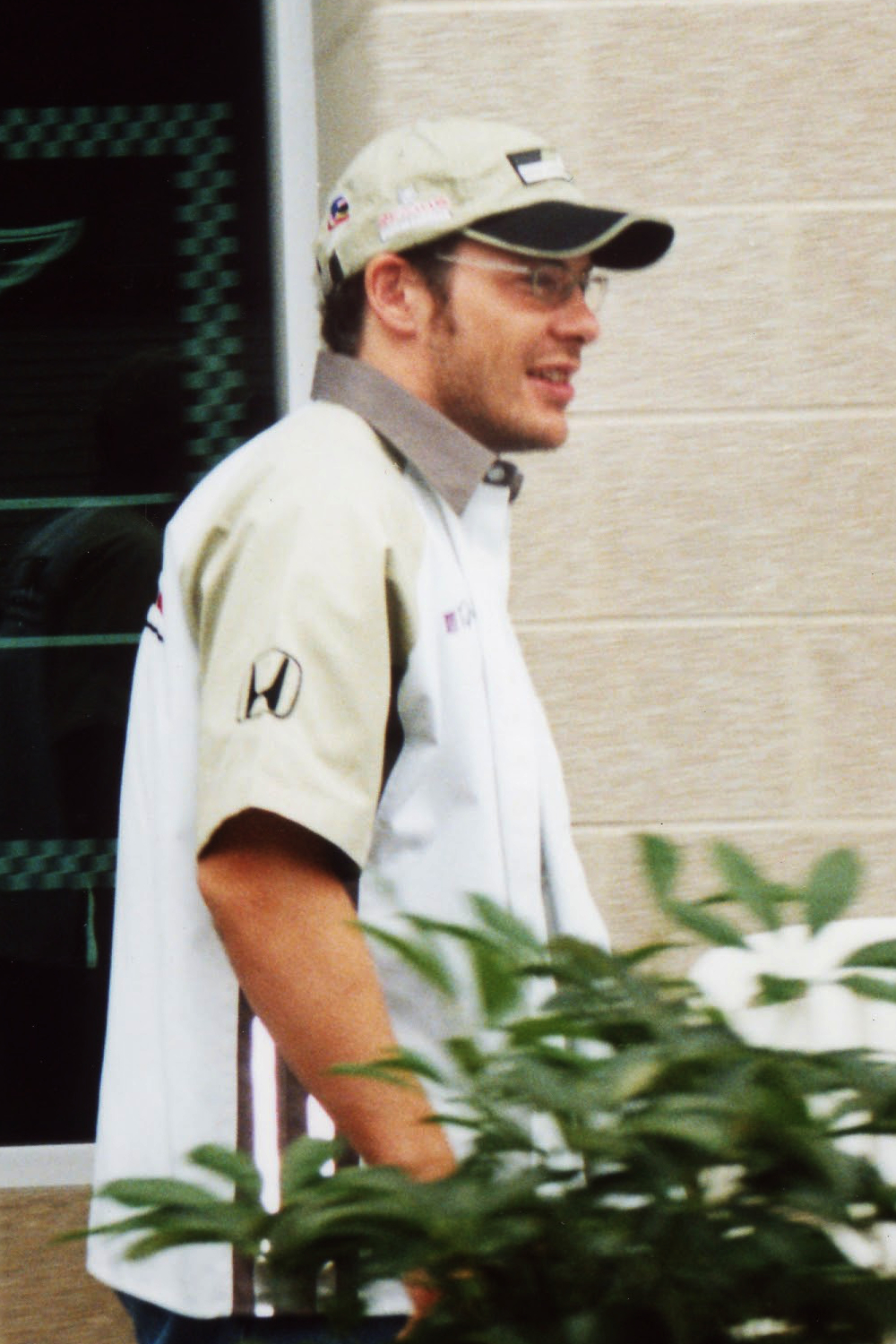
Jacques Villeneuve (pictured in 2002) was involved in a major accident with Ralf Schumacher that caused the death of a spectator marshal at turn three on lap five.

On lap five, a two-car accident led to the safety car's deployment. On the approach to turn three at about 290 km/h (180 mph), Ralf Schumacher, on the left, was about to defend from Villeneuve in the centre. Villeneuve slipstreamed Ralf Schumacher, and was caught out by him under braking. Villeneuve's right-front tyre struck the Williams' left-rear wheel, launching his car airborne and rotated through 180 degrees towards a retaining catchfence and concrete barrier to his left. The resulting impact of more than 30G against the fence, and cart-wheeling along the wall, destroyed the rear of Villeneuve's car up to the carbon fibre monocoque. Ralf Schumacher's rear wing was removed and he spun into the gravel trap. Villeneuve's 38 cm (380 mm) right-rear wheel detached from the car because of a wheel tether failure and catapulted through a 40 cm (400 mm) access area. It struck the chest of 51-year-old track marshal Graham Beveridge at around 175 km/h (109 mph), causing the left ventricle of his heart to rupture, as well as lung and liver lacerations. He was killed instantly. The force of the impact catapulted Beveridge backwards and clockwise, resting on his back with his eyes open. 11 spectators were injured by flying debris.

An ambulance was dispatched, and race officials prevented nearby spectators from forcing their way through a tarpaulin to watch medical personnel tend to Beveridge or scavenge debris. Beveridge was transported to the track's medical centre and then under resuscitation to the trauma and intensive care unit of The Alfred Hospital, under a protocol established by the local sanctioning body, the Confederation of Australian Motor Sport (CAMS), and the hospital. He was officially declared dead at 15:08 local time. In the meantime, track marshals cleared debris and the remaining drivers conserved fuel at reduced speed behind the safety car. They swerved from side-to-side to maintain warm temperatures in their tyres. Both Ralf Schumacher and Villeneuve clambered out of their cars unaided. Several hours later, Villeneuve admitted himself to hospital, with bruising, muscle damage, nausea and chest pains, mostly due to the pressure put upon him by his car's seat belts in the accident.

Verstappen made a tactical pit stop on lap 15 to support his two-stop strategy. He caught up to the field before the safety car was withdrawn at the end of the lap. Michael Schumacher began to pull away from the rest of the field, increasing his lead by two-tenths of a second per lap. There were overtakes farther down the field. Montoya passed Fisichella for ninth, and Irvine overtook Verstappen and Alonso. Räikkönen passed Button for tenth place on lap 17. Button took his stop-and-go penalty on the next lap. He emerged at the back of the order, Michael Schumacher opened up a five-second lead over Häkkinen in second by lap 25. Häkkinen retired from the race for the third year in a row on lap 26 with a left-front suspension failure under braking at the end of the back straight sending him backwards into the tyre barrier at Ascari corner. Häkkinen exited his McLaren with a mild concussion from flying debris striking his helmet and went to the medical centre for a precautionary check-up.

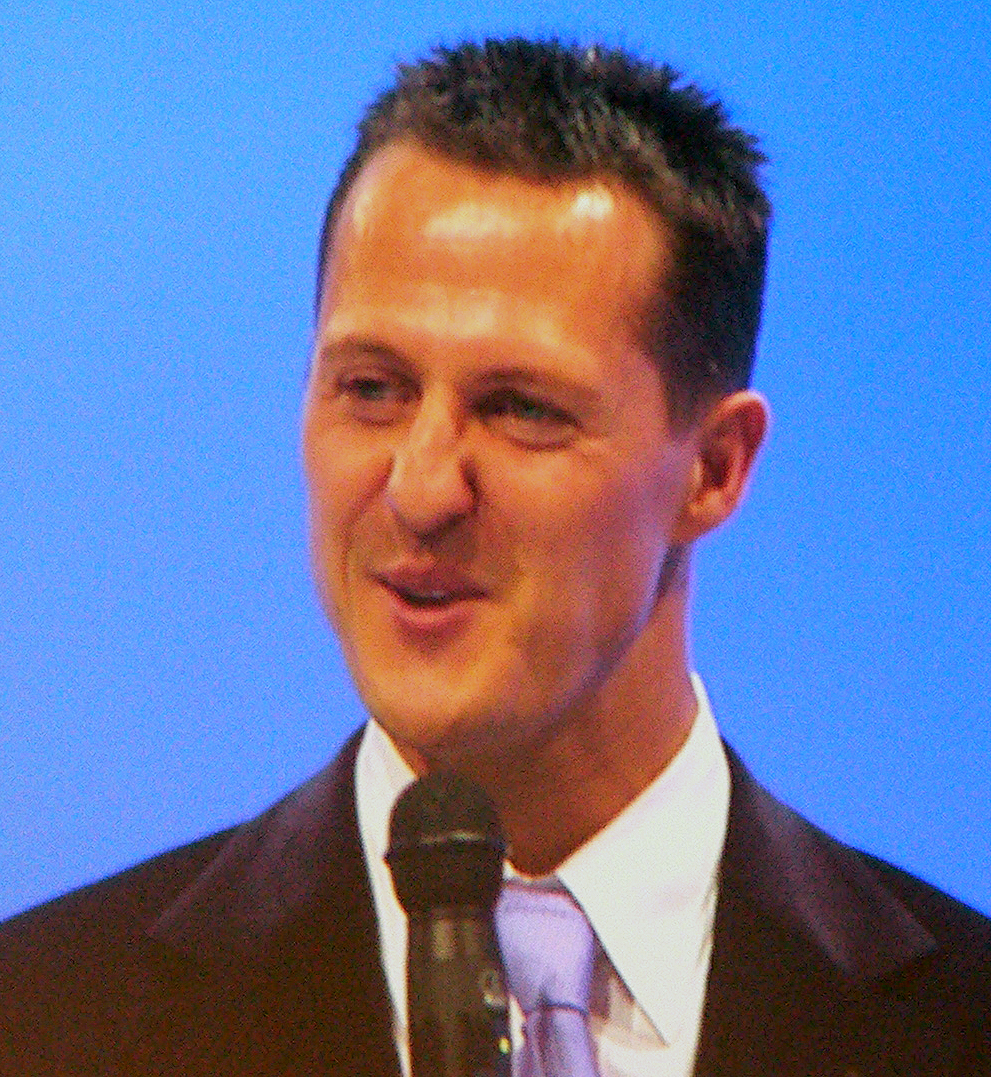
Michael Schumacher (pictured in 2007) won his fifth consecutive Grand Prix and the 45th of his career.

With Häkkinen's retirement, Michael Schumacher led his teammate Barrichello by ten seconds and pulled away. Coulthard started to draw closer to Barrichello albeit momentarily delayed by Fisichella's slower Benetton. On lap 31, Panis overtook Trulli for fourth as the latter slowed with a misfiring engine; Trulli soon retired. Three laps later, Alonso exited the pit lane following a pit stop and temporarily delayed Barrichello, unbalancing the Ferrari enough to allow Coulthard to stay in his slipstream into turn three. Coulthard steered left and overtook Barrichello into turn four. By this point, Michael Schumacher had extended his lead to 15 seconds and set the race's fastest lap of 1 minute 28.214 seconds on lap 34. He relinquished the lead to Coulthard on lap 37 with his only pit stop for fuel and tyres and rejoined in third. Barrichello made a pit stop from second two laps later, rejoining the track in fifth.

A full tank of fuel and traffic meant Michael Schumacher fell 18.1 seconds behind Coulthard until the latter entered the pit lane at the end of lap 41. Coulthard rejoined the race in second, behind Michael Schumacher. After the pit stops, Michael Schumacher led Coulthard by 10.5 seconds. He, in turn, was 10 seconds in front of Barrichello, who was delayed by Alonso after exiting the pit lane. Panis in fourth pulled away from Heidfeld in fifth. Montoya stopped on the circuit due to an engine failure caused by a broken oil pipe on lap 41, prematurely ending his maiden Grand Prix. His retirement promoted Frentzen to sixth. Following a period of stability throughout the field, Verstappen passed Alesi for tenth on the 49th lap. Four laps later, Button was slowed by a split exhaust system that burned through the wiring loom. He retired because it overheated his car's electronics. Michael Schumacher finished first after 58 laps to achieve his fifth consecutive victory and the 45th of his career. Coulthard was 1.717 seconds behind in second with Barrichello a further 31 seconds adrift in third. Panis was fourth on the road, Heidfeld finished fifth and he held off Frentzen in sixth over the last nine laps. Räikkönen, Burti, Verstappen, Alesi, Irvine, Alonso and Fisichella (with engine trouble) were the final finishers.

=== Post-race ===
Out of respect for Beveridge's death, the top three drivers on the podium refrained from spraying champagne. Michael Schumacher expressed the importance of ensuring he did not push too hard, "Any time I needed to be fast, I was able to go fast, and what is good is that finally we seem to be able to do good starts as well. So all in all, it's the way we wanted to be and for that reason we can obviously be confident for the rest of the season, but obviously we know there is no reason to be overconfident." Coulthard said he felt fortunate to finish second after starting from sixth, "I would imagine the team are disappointed, obviously, for whatever the particular problem was with Mika's car, but you've always got to expect some reliability issues in the first race. You hope you can get two cars to the finish, but I don't believe any team would put a lot of money on both their cars making it so far." Barrichello explained he did not battle Coulthard because of understeer and was told by Ferrari's technical director, Ross Brawn, to slow towards the race's end because of fluctuating oil pressure, "It was a difficult race since the beginning, because I had all sorts of troubles."

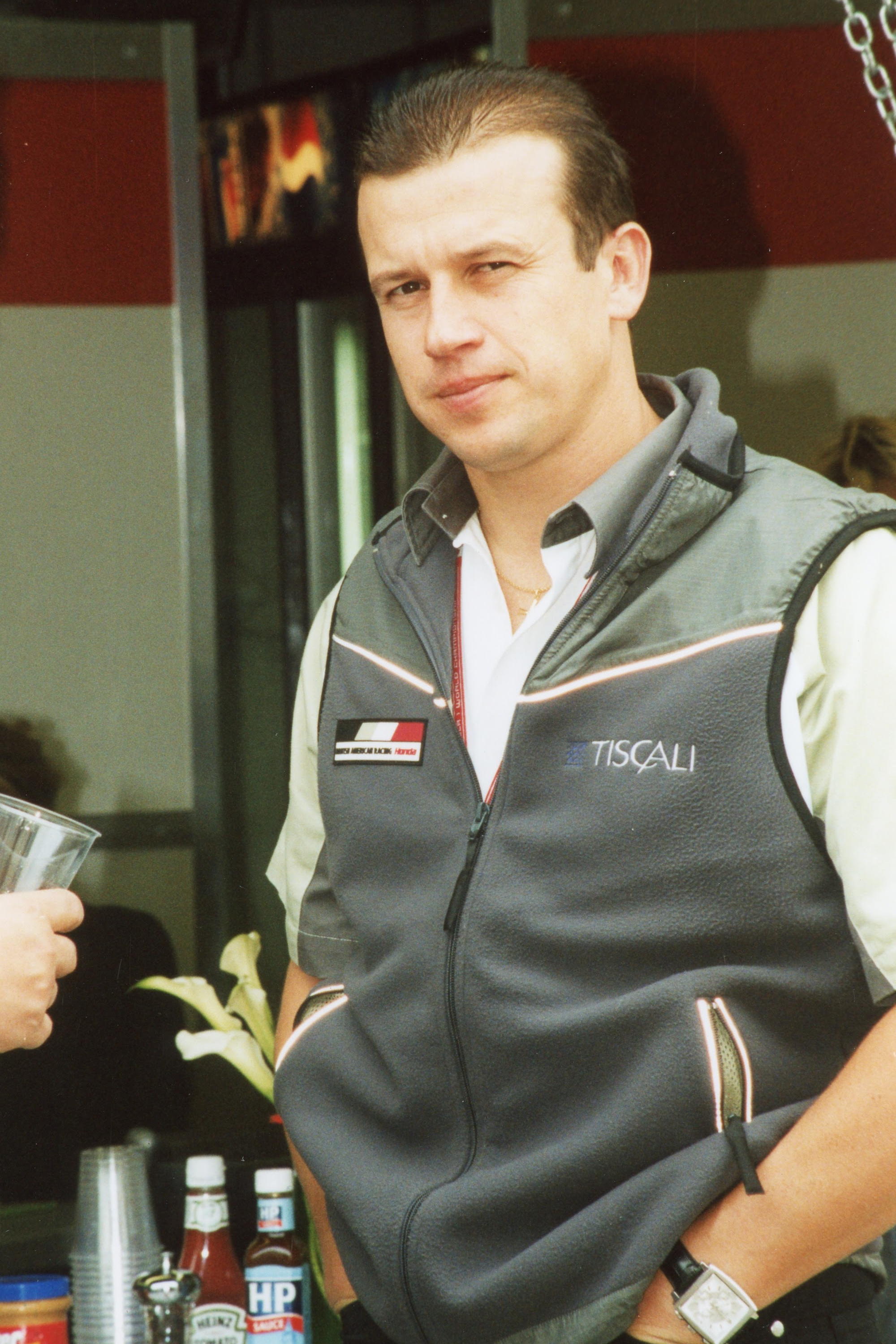
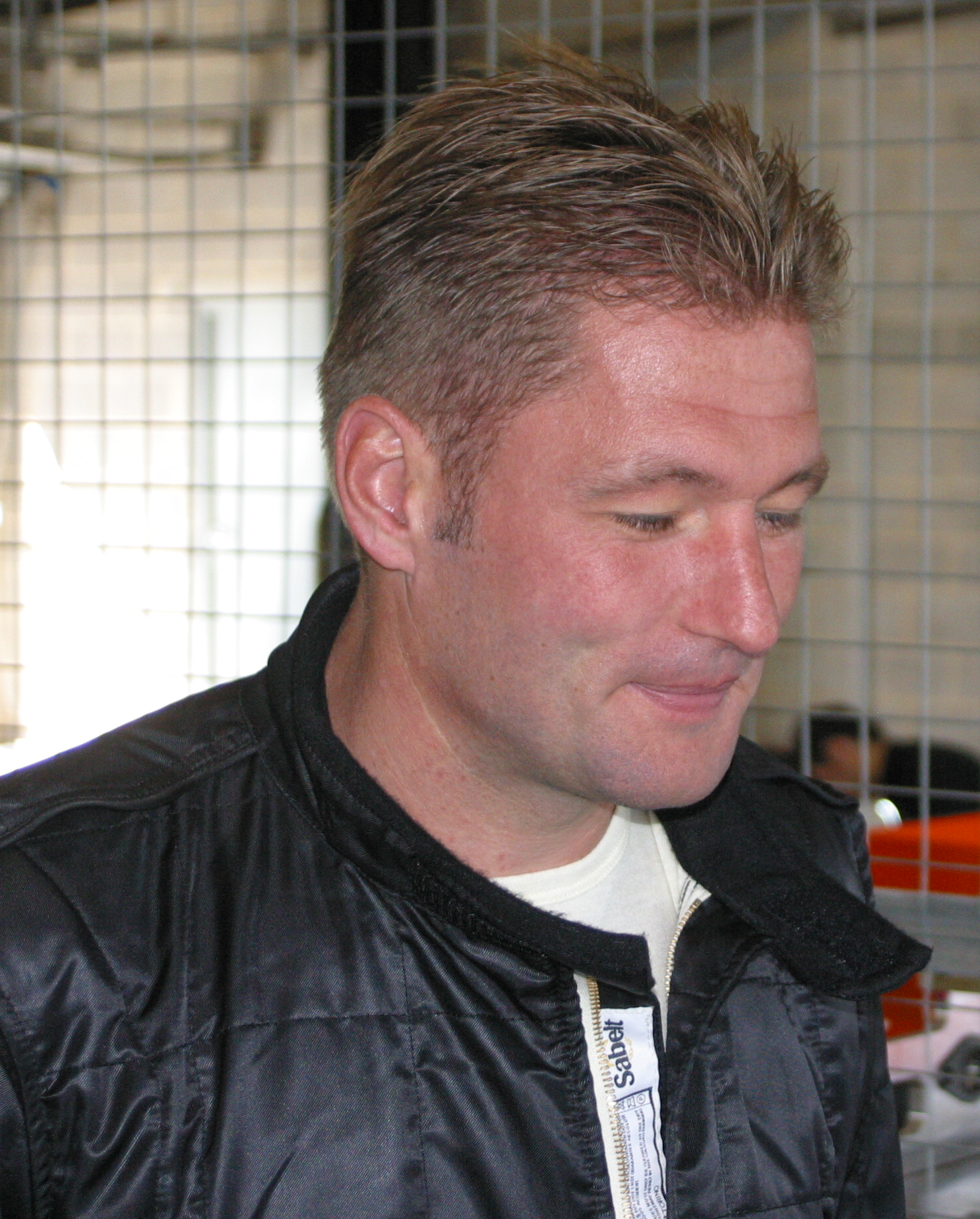
Olivier Panis (pictured on the left in 2002) and Jos Verstappen (pictured on the right in 2005) had 25 seconds added to their total race times after the stewards deemed them to have passed Sauber's Nick Heidfeld under yellow flag conditions.

Sauber team owner Peter Sauber filed an official appeal with race officials against the BAR and Arrows teams because he believed Panis and Verstappen illegally overtook Heidfeld under yellow flag conditions for Bernoldi's lap two crash. The stewards interviewed the three drivers and reviewed video footage of the incident before upholding Sauber's protest. Panis and Verstappen incurred a 25-second time penalty and dropped from fourth to seventh and ninth to tenth, respectively. This promoted Heidfeld to fourth, Frentzen to fifth and Räikkönen into sixth. Panis argued the stewards made an incorrect decision because he felt Heidfeld was overtaken in an area where there were no yellow flags, "What makes me furious is that I was found guilty without any evidence. There was no report from the track marshals and it was all based on accusations made by Nick Heidfeld. It was his word against mine and they said he was right."

Frentzen felt he missed the chance of taking a podium finish due to the collision with Barrichello albeit unangry about it, saying, "At the end of the day I took away two points for a fifth place spot which, considering how the race went for me, was still pretty good. However, I could have easily been in second place had things gone my way." Barrichello argued Frentzen went towards him and affected the toe-in of his left-front wheel. Frentzen chose not complain about the contact saying, "it wouldn't help anything and I am sure that he is sorry for what he did, especially as it upset the handling of his car for the rest of the race." Räikkönen was praised by the press and Sauber personnel for his performance. The Guardian's Richard Williams wrote Räikkönen had possibly the best Formula One début of any driver since Villeneuve moved from CART and finished second at the 1996 Australian Grand Prix. David Tremayne of The Independent on Sunday felt Räikkönen "did not put a wheel wrong all weekend." Jacky Eeckelaert, Räikkönen's race engineer, said the driver "drove a perfect three days, like a driver who's been doing it for 10 years" and Heidfeld stated he was happy for his teammate.

Five days after the race, Frentzen wrote on his website he was suspicious that Sauber illegally used traction control (a driver aid outlawed after the 1993 championship, which was permitted from the fifth round of the 2001 season, the Spanish Grand Prix) on their cars to get an unfair advantage. He clarified his comments three days later to say the Sauber's fast acceleration out of the tight corners was achieved by an engine software package lowering its power and eliminating wheelspin, "It cannot be ignored that something like that exists, there is simply no room for discussion about that. On the other hand, however, you can discuss if the device that exists is legal or illegal." Michael Schumacher responded by saying Frentzen had brought Formula One into disrepute and argued the latter should concentrate on his own car and performance, "To make this stupid comment is completely unfair, he should rethink what he is saying. I know he does not say it is illegal but then he has to say that we have done a very good job, not say that it is dubious what we are doing." Frentzen clarified he did not state any car running a Ferrari engine had an illegal traction control system in any media interview or on his website.

As this was the first race of the season, Michael Schumacher led the World Drivers' Championship with ten championship points. He was followed by Coulthard in second with six championship points and Barrichello in third with four championship points. Heidfeld was in fourth with three championship points and Frentzen was fifth with two championship points. In the World Constructors' Championship, Ferrari collected 14 championship points because of Michael Schumacher's victory and Barrichello's third-place finish. That gave them an eight-point gap over the second-placed McLaren. Sauber's double points finish placed them third with four championship points. Frentzen's fifth-place result put Jordan in fourth with sixteen races remaining in the season.

=== Race classification ===
Drivers who scored championship points are denoted in bold.

| Pos | No. | Driver | Constructor | Tyre | Laps | Time/Retired | Grid | Points |
|---|---|---|---|---|---|---|---|---|
| 1 | 1 | (Germany) **Michael Schumacher** | **Ferrari** | B | 58 | 1:38:26.533 | 1 | 10 |
| 2 | 4 | (United Kingdom) **David Coulthard** | **McLaren-Mercedes** | B | 58 | +1.717 | 6 | 6 |
| 3 | 2 | (Brazil) **Rubens Barrichello** | **Ferrari** | B | 58 | +33.491 | 2 | 4 |
| 4 | 16 | (Germany) **Nick Heidfeld** | **Sauber-Petronas** | B | 58 | +1:11.479 | 10 | 3 |
| 5 | 11 | (Germany) **Heinz-Harald Frentzen** | **Jordan-Honda** | B | 58 | +1:12.807 | 4 | 2 |
| 6 | 17 | (Finland) **Kimi Räikkönen** | **Sauber-Petronas** | B | 58 | +1:24.143 | 13 | 1 |
| 7^{2} | 9 | (France) Olivier Panis | BAR-Honda | B | 58 | +1:27.050 | 9 | |
| 8 | 19 | (Brazil) Luciano Burti | Jaguar-Cosworth | M | 57 | +1 Lap | 21 | |
| 9 | 22 | (France) Jean Alesi | Prost-Acer | M | 57 | +1 Lap | 14 | |
| 10^{2} | 14 | (Netherlands) Jos Verstappen | Arrows-Asiatech | B | 57 | +1 Lap | 15 | |
| 11 | 18 | (United Kingdom) Eddie Irvine | Jaguar-Cosworth | M | 57 | +1 Lap | 12 | |
| 12 | 21 | (Spain) Fernando Alonso | Minardi-European | M | 56 | +2 Laps | 19 | |
| 13 | 7 | (Italy) Giancarlo Fisichella | Benetton-Renault | M | 55 | +3 Laps | 17 | |
| 14 | 8 | (United Kingdom) Jenson Button | Benetton-Renault | M | 52 | Electrical | 16 | |
| Ret | 6 | (Colombia) Juan Pablo Montoya | Williams-BMW | M | 40 | Engine | 11 | |
| Ret | 12 | (Italy) Jarno Trulli | Jordan-Honda | B | 38 | Clutch | 7 | |
| Ret | 3 | (Finland) Mika Häkkinen | McLaren-Mercedes | B | 25 | Suspension/Accident | 3 | |
| Ret | 5 | (Germany) Ralf Schumacher | Williams-BMW | M | 4 | Collision | 5 | |
| Ret | 10 | (Canada) Jacques Villeneuve | BAR-Honda | B | 4 | Collision | 8 | |
| Ret | 20 | (Brazil) Tarso Marques | Minardi-European | M | 3 | Battery | 22 | |
| Ret | 15 | (Brazil) Enrique Bernoldi | Arrows-Asiatech | B | 2 | Accident | 18 | |
| Ret | 23 | (Argentina) Gastón Mazzacane | Prost-Acer | M | 0 | Brakes/Engine | 20 | |

Notes

- **^2** – Olivier Panis and Jos Verstappen originally finished fourth and ninth respectively, but each received a 25-second post-race time penalty for overtaking under yellow flag conditions.

== Death of Graham Beveridge and inquiries ==
The death of spectator marshal Graham Beveridge overshadowed the race. He was the first track marshal to die from injuries sustained during a Formula One race since Paolo Gislimberti at the 2000 Italian Grand Prix. He predeceased his wife and three adult children. At the request of his family, his death was not made public during the event, and Michael Schumacher announced Beveridge had died, at the post-race press conference. The day after the race, Beveridge's family spent more than half an hour visiting the accident site and the crash was explained by a race official. CAMS and National Australia Bank formed a trust fund for his family for individuals to donate to, and a subsequent public auction to sell Formula One memorabilia raised more than A$100,000. On 9 March, a memorial service was held at the St. Jude's Anglican Church in Beveridge's hometown of Bowral, New South Wales. He was buried at the Bundaberg General Cemetery four days later. A park bench opposite turn three was dedicated in his memory at a commemoration service on 9 November 2002.

The race stewards investigated the crash and chose not to pursue any action against Villeneuve and Ralf Schumacher. They rated the crash "a racing incident", with neither driver to blame. The FIA launched an inquiry as Villeneuve's car was impounded on the order of the state coroner of Victoria Graeme Johnstone for his investigation. The section of catchfence that Villeneuve's right-rear wheel penetrated was stored at the Victoria Police's traffic centre in Brunswick. Both Villeneuve and Ralf Schumacher were interviewed by officers from the Victoria Police's Major Collision Investigation Unit. The FIA's investigation was completed on 3 August. In its confidential report, the organisers of the race, the Australian Grand Prix Corporation (AGPC), were absolved of any responsibility for the death of Beveridge, which it called "a freak accident", and discovered the marshal was stationed at an incorrect position at the time of the crash.

=== Coronial inquest ===
Following the Victoria Police Major Collision Investigation Unit examination lasting eight months and also absolved the AGPC, on 3 December 2001 the official inquest into the death of Beveridge opened in Melbourne. The FIA severed all formal links with the inquest and withdrew instructions to local lawyers to act on its behalf. The governing body's own appointee, the race director and permanent starter Charlie Whiting, did not appear in person or provide evidence by satellite.

During the inquest, the court was told Beveridge was instructed to stand at the fence opening to prevent spectators from accessing the track and it had prevented any further fatalities. The issue over the height of the catchfence was then raised by the inquest. Tim Schenken, a member of CAMS, said some of the fences were raised in height by 1 m (39 in) before the 1999 race albeit he had no knowledge if a formal risk analysis report was carried out to assess the potential danger to marshals and spectators. Following this, a safety engineer was called to the stand. He said the fence was too low and a Formula One car could cartwheel over it if a collision occurred. He also theorised debris could be projected for around 300 m (980 ft) past the fence and be launched as high as 22 m (72 ft) into the air. A British track marshal told the court this had twice been the case at the Silverstone Circuit in the United Kingdom. The inquest later heard the AGPC rejected Whiting's suggestion to increase the height of the fences in 1998 and 2001, something CAMS and the AGPC denied.

The court was then shown a video of Martin Brundle's airborne accident on the first lap of the 1996 race which occurred at the same corner where Beveridge died. The manager of safety services for CAMS stated he could not recall any meeting to discuss the crash and no investigation occurred since nobody was injured. Villeneuve's damaged car was brought into the court to explain why its wheel tethers failed in the accident. It was told while the car met FIA international standards dictating the wheel tethers to withstand 500 t (490 long tons; 550 short tons) of pressure, three of them failed in the collision. The BAR technical director Malcolm Oastler said the design of the wheel tether was changed following the accident.

On 19 December, the final submissions were made to the inquest. Jim Kennan, the counsel assisting the coroner, argued the organisation that should be held responsible for Beveridge's death was the AGPC under the Australian Grand Prix Act, "No one organisation accepted ultimate responsibility for the design – AGPC relied on CAMS, CAMS relied on FIA, the FIA said the local promoter had ultimate responsibility." Johnstone's report was released on 8 February 2002. It agreed with Kennan's suggestion the AGPC was the sole company responsible for Beveridge's death due to it not analysing the risks to marshals and concluded the accident was "avoidable".

=== Physician's inquest ===
In December 2002, the Medical Practitioners Board of Victoria opened an investigation into the professional conduct of three senior physicians who treated Beveridge at the scene of the accident when Johnstone's report revealed medical records had been altered to disguise the fact the marshal died at the track. It found a physician was told via telephone resuscitation on Beveridge had stopped at 14:47 local time and he subsequently ordered the nurse who produced the record to delete it. One physician said he had an obligation to transport casualties and fatalities to The Alfred Hospital for their official certification of death. Two of three senior physicians were found guilty of professional misconduct by the four-member panel on 7 November 2003. In June 2004, an appeals tribunal reversed the unprofessional conduct decision on the chief medical officer, who deemed he had committed an "error of judgement".

== Championship standings after the race ==
Drivers' Championship standings

| Pos | Driver | Points |
|---|---|---|
| 1 | (Germany) Michael Schumacher | 10 |
| 2 | (United Kingdom) David Coulthard | 6 |
| 3 | (Brazil) Rubens Barrichello | 4 |
| 4 | (Germany) Nick Heidfeld | 3 |
| 5 | (Germany) Heinz-Harald Frentzen | 2 |

Constructors' Championship standings

| Pos | Constructor | Points |
|---|---|---|
| 1 | (Italy) Ferrari | 14 |
| 2 | (United Kingdom) McLaren-Mercedes | 6 |
| 3 | (Switzerland) Sauber-Petronas | 4 |
| 4 | (Republic of Ireland) Jordan-Honda | 2 |
Sources:

- Note: Only the top five positions are included for both sets of standings.

| Previous race: 2000 Malaysian Grand Prix | FIA Formula One World Championship; 2001 season | Next race: 2001 Malaysian Grand Prix |
| Previous race: 2000 Australian Grand Prix | Australian Grand Prix | Next race: 2002 Australian Grand Prix |
