= 2001 Monaco Grand Prix =

Formula One motor race held in 2001

Coordinates: 43°44′4.74″N 7°25′16.8″E

Race 7 of 17 in the 2001 Formula One World Championship
← Previous race	Next race →

Race details
- Date: 27 May 2001
- Official name: Grand Prix de Monaco 2001
- Location: Circuit de Monaco, La Condamine and Monte-Carlo, Monaco
- Course: Street circuit
- Course length: 3.370 km (2.094 miles)
- Distance: 78 laps, 262.860 km (163.334 miles)
- Weather: Warm and Sunny, Air Temp: 23 °C (73 °F), Track 36 to 39 °C (97 to 102 °F)
- Attendance: 100,000

Pole position
Driver	(United Kingdom) David Coulthard	McLaren-Mercedes
- Time: 1:17.430

Fastest lap
Driver	(United Kingdom) David Coulthard	McLaren-Mercedes
- Time: 1:19.424 on lap 68

Podium
First	(Germany) Michael Schumacher	Ferrari
Second	(Brazil) Rubens Barrichello	Ferrari
Third	(United Kingdom) Eddie Irvine	Jaguar-Cosworth

The 2001 Monaco Grand Prix (formally the Grand Prix de Monaco 2001) was a Formula One motor race held before 100,000 spectators at the Circuit de Monaco in La Condamine and Monte Carlo on 27 May. It was the seventh race of the 2001 Formula One World Championship and the 59th Monaco Grand Prix. Michael Schumacher won the 78-lap race for the Ferrari team. His teammate Rubens Barrichello finished second with Jaguar's Eddie Irvine third.

Michael Schumacher led the World Drivers' Championship going into the event and his team Ferrari were first from McLaren in the World Constructors' Championship. McLaren's David Coulthard, who qualified in pole position by setting the fastest lap in qualifying, stalled at the start of the formation lap because of an electronic launch control system fault, leading to Schumacher inheriting his position. Schumacher maintained the lead in the first laps with Mika Häkkinen second and Barrichello third. Häkkinen responded to Schumacher's pace before he lost second to Barrichello on lap 13 because his car pulled to the right. Schumacher continued to lead until he made a pit stop on the 55th lap, relinquishing it to Barrichello for four laps. He would return to first position and held it to achieve his fourth victory of the season and the 48th of his career.

As a consequence of the race, Michael Schumacher extended his lead in the World Drivers' Championship from four to twelve championship points over Coulthard. Barrichello maintained third and Ralf Schumacher remained in fourth after he retired late in the event. In the World Constructors' Championship, Ferrari extended their lead over McLaren to 32 championship points. Williams and Jordan kept third and fourth and Sauber maintained fifth with ten races remaining in the season.

== Background ==
The 2001 Monaco Grand Prix was the 7th of the 17 races in the 2001 Formula One World Championship and the 59th edition of the event. It was held at the 19-turn 3.370 km (2.094 mi) Circuit de Monaco between La Condamine and Monte Carlo on 27 May. There were 11 teams (each representing a different constructor) entering two drivers each for the event. Before the race, Ferrari driver Michael Schumacher led the World Drivers' Championship with 42 championship points, ahead of McLaren's David Coulthard in second with 38 and the second Ferrari of Rubens Barrichello in third with 18. Ralf Schumacher of Williams was fourth with 12 championship points, and Sauber driver Nick Heidfeld was fifth with 8 championship points. In the World Constructors' Championship, Ferrari led with 60 championship points, McLaren and Williams were second and third with 42 and 18 championship points, as Jordan and Sauber contended for fourth place.

Michael Schumacher had won three of the six preceding races of and took pole position in five of them. He was optimistic about his prospects of equalling Graham Hill's record of five Monaco Grand Prix victories, "Traditionally, I have always gone well in Monte Carlo. On top of that, we have a great car this year and so I think we will be very competitive in our fight with McLaren for pole position and the win." Coulthard, the 2000 Monaco race winner, said he wanted to repeat his success from the year before and saw an opportunity to take the lead of the World Drivers' Championship. Jaguar's Eddie Irvine said he was optimistic for Monaco because of his finishing record at the track, "I have a good track record at this place, with a second, a third and last year fourth place to my name. I am reasonably optimistic about our chances this weekend."

Following the Austrian Grand Prix two weeks prior, where four cars stalled at the start because of electronic launch control systems failures, concerns were voiced by the technical director of Williams Patrick Head and Jordan's Jarno Trulli over driver safety because of the possibility of stranded vehicles and a major accident. Others differed with Coulthard saying that launch control could help make faster getaways, and Michael Schumacher predicted that there would be no repeat of cars being unable to start, noting that McLaren driver Mika Häkkinen stalled at the Brazilian Grand Prix without launch control. Max Mosley, the Fédération Internationale de l'Automobile (FIA; Formula One's governing body) president, advised teams to switch off their launch control systems if they expressed concerns over its reliability; he ruled out banning the aid for the Monaco race. Jordan subsequently deactivated launch control on their EJ11s and opted for a manual system due to the Circuit de Monaco's narrow characteristic. Although the FIA warned of "severe penalties" for teams who did not correctly set-up the systems, it allowed drivers to rehearse their starts at the conclusion of Thursday's practice sessions and Sunday's warm-up session.

Due to the configuration of the Circuit de Monaco, with its low average speed and abundance of low-speed corners, allied to the low-grip nature of the public road surface, the teams all set their cars up to produce the maximum amount of downforce and mechanical grip possible. Prost introduced new front and rear wings, undertray and rear crash structure to Jean Alesi's car. Benetton fitted a revised aerodynamic package with new front and rear wings and sidepods to its B201s. Jaguar ran with a revised rear crash structure to match its new diffuser and new rear wing components and undertray from Saturday's practice sessions. Arrows debuted an elevated nose wing positioned vertically on two uprights over the top of Jos Verstappen's front wing aimed at increasing the maximum amount of downforce available. Jordan introduced a similar modification on Trulli's car; their design was positioned in front of the driver. The devices were examined after Thursday's practice sessions by the FIA technical delegate Jo Bauer, who believed they were an infringement of Formula One regulations. Jordan and Arrows were required to remove the aerodynamic devices for safety reasons by the FIA, and the stewards warned the two teams that they risked exclusion from the Grand Prix if they were used again.

== Practice ==
A total of four practice sessions preceded Sunday's race—two one-hour sessions on Thursday, and two 45-minute sessions on Saturday. Both of Thursday's sessions saw dry and warm weather. In the morning practice session, Michael Schumacher lapped fastest at 1:21.577, 0.827 seconds faster than Coulthard in second. The two Jordan cars of Trulli and Heinz-Harald Frentzen, Barrichello, Häkkinen, Olivier Panis of British American Racing (BAR), Ralf Schumacher, Irvine and Alesi followed in the top ten. On a dirty track, Pedro de la Rosa damaged the front left corner of his Jaguar by hitting a barrier at Portier turn, and Tarso Marques spun his Minardi car 180 degrees backwards into a wall at the entry to La Rascasse corner. Since spare cars could not be driven until qualifying on Saturday, neither driver returned to the track for the rest of the session.

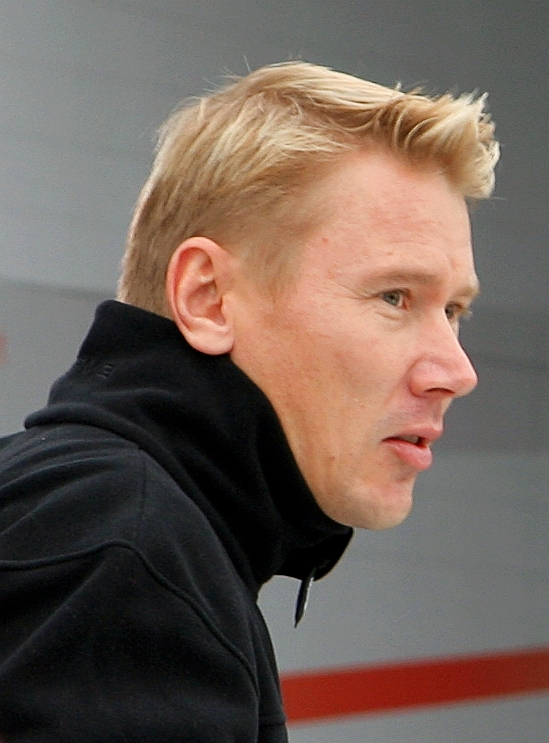
Mika Häkkinen (pictured in 2006) set the fastest lap time in practice in the third session on Saturday morning.

Häkkinen led the afternoon session with the day's fastest lap, a 1:19.853, with Michael Schumacher (who was unable to improve his lap in the final minute due to debris and slower cars), Ralf Schumacher, Barrichello, Trulli, Coulthard, Frentzen, Alesi, BAR's Jacques Villeneuve and Williams' Juan Pablo Montoya in positions two through ten. Coulthard struck the Armco barrier at the left-hand Tabac corner with the right-rear wheel and broke his car's right-front track rod, which was replaced by the McLaren mechanics in the pit lane before he could continue driving. Fernando Alonso spun his Minardi into a wall at La Rascasse turn and damaged its rear suspension, curtailing his session. With 15 minutes to go, Montoya damaged his car's rear at La Rascasse turn, and the session was stopped for four minutes as track marshals extricated him. Just before the session concluded, his teammate Ralf Schumacher removed his car's left-hand suspension units at the Swimming Pool complex. Two track marshals retrieving Schumacher's front wing narrowly avoided being hit by Enrique Bernoldi's Arrows car. Irvine spun at the Novelle Chicane and Michael Schumacher swerved to avoid hitting his car.

After taking Friday off—a feature of the event timetable that was unique to Monaco— (Note: The Friday of the Monaco Grand Prix was declared as a rest day, as it is typically associated with Ascension Day and the roads could re-open for the day.) the drivers returned to action on Saturday morning in clear weather. Ralf Schumacher complained of head and neck pain following his crash in the second session and was treated by his team's physiotherapist before being ordered to rest until Saturday. Nevertheless, he lapped quickest in the third practice session at 1:21.036, ahead of Villeneuve, Coulthard, Michael Schumacher, Sauber's Kimi Räikkönen, Irvine, Alesi, Frentzen, Panis and Trulli. After 13 minutes, Verstappen's engine failed, and laid oil at La Rascasse corner, prompting a quarter of an hour stoppage for marshals to clear it with sand. Luciano Burti's Prost car had a mechanical failure that sent him veering into the Sainte Devote tyre wall and narrowly avoided hitting multiple stationary recovery vehicles with three minutes remaining. Burti was unhurt.

The delay to dry the oil at La Rascasse turn delayed the start of the fourth session by 10 minutes. Once underway, Häkkinen was fastest with a lap of 1:18.282, followed by Michael Schumacher, Ralf Schumacher, Coulthard, Irvine, Trulli, Montoya, Barrichello, Alesi and Frentzen. Alonso spun 180 degrees at the Loews hairpin and blocked the track. Frentzen stopped into Casino Square corner and track marshals extricated his car. Räikkönen and Bernoldi had separate crashes at the Swimming Pool complex and La Rascasse corner; Bernoldi's front wing got lodged in Häkkinen's front suspension. Giancarlo Fisichella spun at La Racasse and blocked the circuit as track marshals extricated his Benetton car.

== Qualifying ==
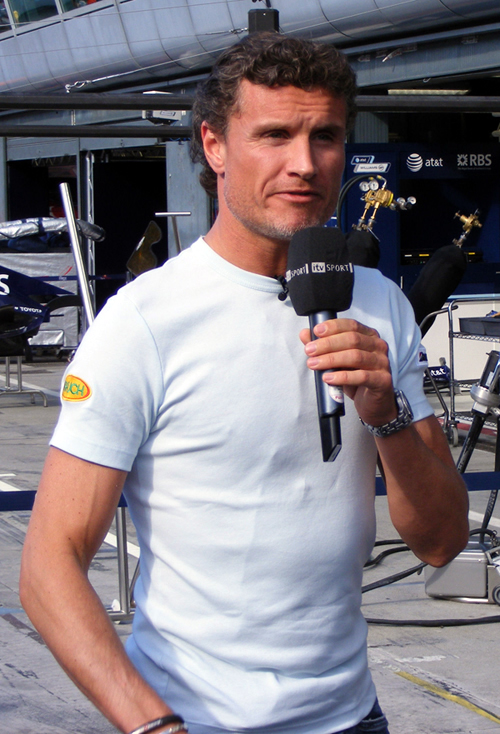
David Coulthard (pictured in 2007) took the 12th pole position of his career and his second of the season.

Saturday's afternoon one hour qualifying session saw each driver was limited to twelve laps, with the grid order decided by their fastest laps. During this session, the 107% rule was in effect, which necessitated each driver to set a time within 107 per cent of the quickest lap to qualify for the race. Conditions were warm and sunny for qualifying, and many drivers had an old set of front tyres on their cars. Having dropped to fourth after three other drivers lapped faster than him, Coulthard broke the unofficial track lap record set by Frentzen in 1997, and took his second pole position of the season, and the 12th of his career with a time of 1:17.430 set during the closing moments of qualifying. He was joined on the grid's front row by Michael Schumacher who was 0.201 seconds slower after aborting his first timed lap because Bernoldi caught him off guard exiting the tunnel and he lost a tenth of a second by glancing the left-hand side at Le Portier turn during his last quick lap. Häkkinen changed his car's set-up for a final timed run but it gave him excess understeer and a lack of front grip, leaving him third. Fourth-placed Barrichello worked with his engineers following the final practice session to improve his car's performance; he flat-spotted his front-right tyre at Sainte Devote turn. Ralf Schumacher was the best of the Michelin tyre runners in fifth after Jenson Button of the Benetton team impeded his final timed lap. Sixth-placed Irvine secured the Jaguar team's best qualifying result of the season as a result of the aerodynamic and racing setup revisions to his car; he was delayed on his third timed lap and braked early for the Novelle Chicane.

Montoya was seventh in his first appearance at Monaco since the 1998 International Formula 3000 Championship. Trulli secured eighth from losing about two-tenths of a second due to a slower car baulking him. Villeneuve qualified ninth and Fisichella in tenth added more front wing angle to create a balanced car. Alesi was the fastest driver not to qualify in the top ten; he improved on each of his timed laps and made contact with a barrier in the tunnel. Panis in 12th went too quickly at the Piscine chicane on his last lap. Frentzen in 13th spun at Portier corner before the entrance of the tunnel, and he abandoned his car because the constricting barriers left him with little room to recover. De la Rosa was 14th, followed by Räikkönen in 15th, who encountered an abundance of traffic and a waved yellow flag on his final timed lap. His Sauber teammate Heidfeld had an unrectifiable electronic throttle problem on his second timed lap and he took the team's spare car to qualify 16th. Car problems as well as his engine's lack of horsepower created handling balance difficulties and traffic left Button in 17th. Alonso began ahead of both the Arrows cars and Burti's Prost in 18th. Marques, 22nd, had excess oversteer.

=== Qualifying classification ===
Pos	No.	Driver	Constructor	Lap	Gap	Grid
1	4	(United Kingdom) David Coulthard	McLaren-Mercedes	1:17.430	—	1
2	1	(Germany) Michael Schumacher	Ferrari	1:17.631	+0.201	2
3	3	(Finland) Mika Häkkinen	McLaren-Mercedes	1:17.749	+0.319	3
4	2	(Brazil) Rubens Barrichello	Ferrari	1:17.856	+0.426	4
5	5	(Germany) Ralf Schumacher	Williams-BMW	1:18.029	+0.599	5
6	18	(United Kingdom) Eddie Irvine	Jaguar-Cosworth	1:18.432	+1.002	6
7	6	(Colombia) Juan Pablo Montoya	Williams-BMW	1:18.751	+1.321	7
8	12	(Italy) Jarno Trulli	Jordan-Honda	1:18.921	+1.491	8
9	10	(Canada) Jacques Villeneuve	BAR-Honda	1:19.086	+1.656	9
10	7	(Italy) Giancarlo Fisichella	Benetton-Renault	1:19.220	+1.790	10
11	22	(France) Jean Alesi	Prost-Acer	1:19.245	+1.815	11
12	9	(France) Olivier Panis	BAR-Honda	1:19.294	+1.864	12
13	11	(Germany) Heinz-Harald Frentzen	Jordan-Honda	1:19.316	+1.886	13
14	19	(Spain) Pedro de la Rosa	Jaguar-Cosworth	1:20.033	+2.603	14
15	17	(Finland) Kimi Räikkönen	Sauber-Petronas	1:20.081	+2.651	15
16	16	(Germany) Nick Heidfeld	Sauber-Petronas	1:20.261	+2.831	16
17	8	(United Kingdom) Jenson Button	Benetton-Renault	1:20.342	+2.912	17
18	21	(Spain) Fernando Alonso	Minardi-European	1:20.788	+3.358	18
19	14	(Netherlands) Jos Verstappen	Arrows-Asiatech	1:20.823	+3.393	19
20	15	(Brazil) Enrique Bernoldi	Arrows-Asiatech	1:21.336	+3.906	20
21	23	(Brazil) Luciano Burti	Prost-Acer	1:21.771	+4.341	21
22	20	(Brazil) Tarso Marques	Minardi-European	1:22.201	+4.771	22
107% time: 1:22.850

== Warm-up ==
A 30-minute warm-up session was held on Sunday morning in dry weather. Coulthard led the session with a time of 1:20.944, ahead of his teammate Häkkinen in second. The Ferrari cars of Michael Schumacher and Barrichello, Frentzen, Ralf Schumacher, Irvine, Verstappen, De la Rosa and Fisichella followed in the top ten. While the session passed relatively peacefully, Marques crashed into an Armco metal barrier at Anthony Noghes corner.

== Race ==
The 78-lap race took place in the afternoon from 14:00 local time and before 100,000 spectators, over a distance of 262.860 km (163.334 mi). The weather was dry and sunny, with the air temperature 23 °C (73 °F) and a track temperature between 36–39 °C (97–102 °F). Several teams began on the soft compound tyres; a one-stop strategy was determined to be ideal, with some drivers making their first pit stops early to advance their position and others stopping later because of a similar performance level. At the start of the formation lap, an electronic launch control software glitch caused Coulthard's engine to cut out and stall, prompting the McLaren mechanics to restart his engine; he was required to begin from the back of the grid. His teammate Häkkinen was stuck behind him; he drove away before the final car passed him and was allowed to start from third place. Michael Schumacher was effective the first driver on the starting grid and made an unchallenged, clean start to lead the field into Sainte Devote, ahead of Häkkinen and Barrichello. Montoya passed Irvine for fifth when the latter ran wide attempting to pass Ralf Schumacher on the left at Sainte Devote corner. Behind the two, Verstappen lost control of his car and made contact with Burti. Verstappen fell to 20th as Burti had one of his endplates removed.

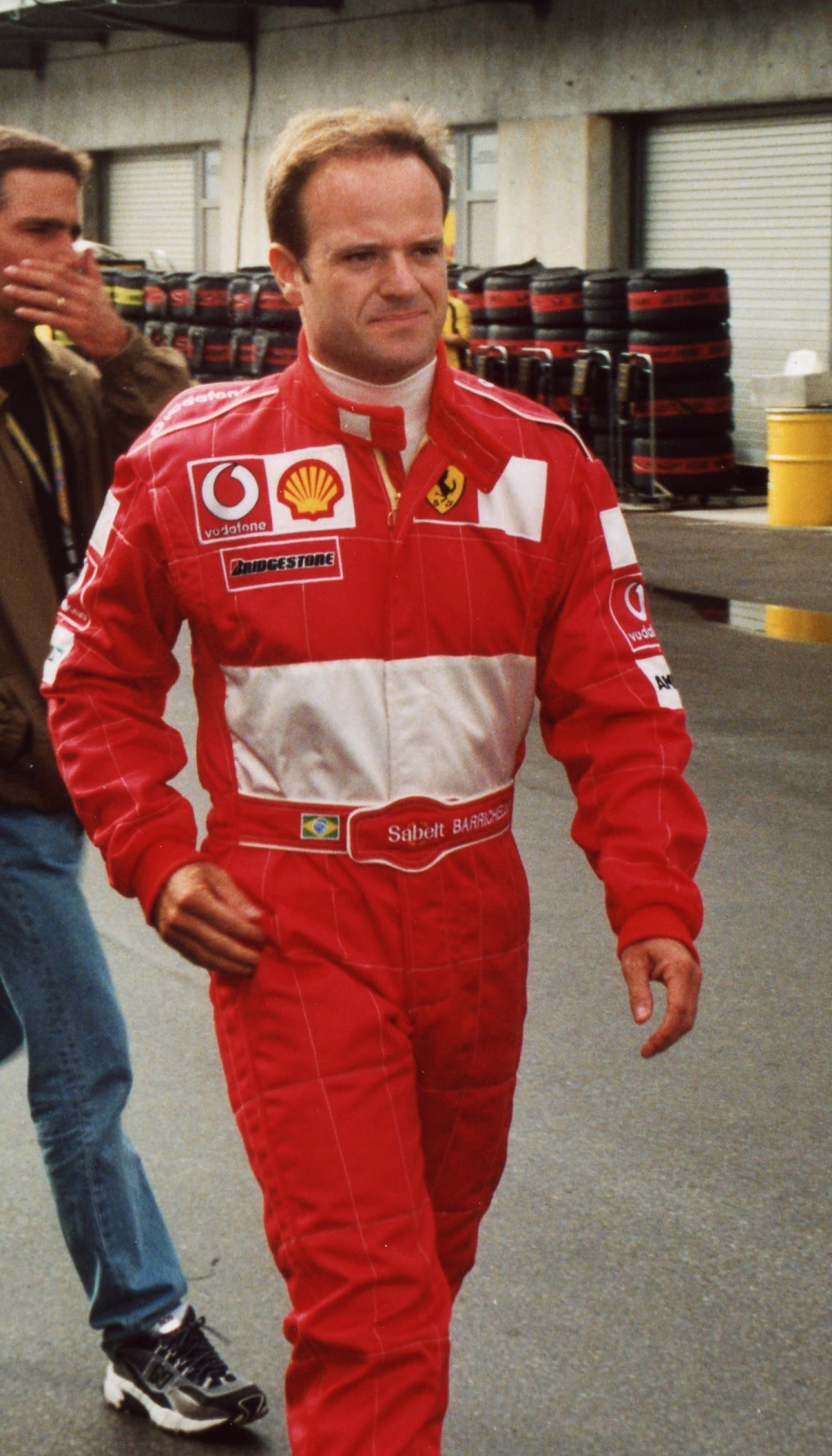
Rubens Barrichello (pictured in 2002) finished in second place

On the run to the exit of Portier corner, Heidfeld and Bernoldi collided, causing Heidfeld to be launched over one of Bernoldi's wheels, and sending him straight into a barrier, making him the race's first retirement on lap one. At the first lap's conclusion, Michael Schumacher led Häkkinen by 1.5 seconds; the duo were followed by Barrichello, Ralf Schumacher, Montoya and Irvine. Montoya recorded the race's fastest lap at that point as he attempted to overtake his teammate Ralf Schumacher. On lap two, Burti fell to 20th when Verstappen and Coulthard passed him. Up front, Michael Schumacher extended his gap over Häkkinen to 1.6 seconds at the start of lap three. That lap, Montoya shifted down a gear, slowed and collected understeer. This put him wide at the entrance of the Swimming Pool complex and hit a barrier. This moved Irvine and Trulli to fifth and sixth respectively. Further back, Marques was passed by Verstappen for 17th and Burti entered the pit lane to replace his damaged front wing. Marques lost a further position through a pass by Coulthard for 18th place on lap four.

Michael Schumacher increased his lead over Häkkinen by another six-tenths of a second on the fifth lap with the latter under pressure from Barrichello and Ralf Schumacher. Häkkinen then went slightly faster to lower the gap to 2.5 seconds and set a new fastest lap under 1:23 to be 1.6 seconds adrift on the eighth lap, to which Michael Schumacher responded with his own fastest lap after Schumacher had eased off to save fuel and preserve his tyres upon realising that he was not pulling away from Häkkinen. That lap, Verstappen overtook his teammate Bernoldi for 16th and the latter now had Coulthard behind him. Bernoldi was able to remain close behind teammate Verstappen until an issue forced him to change onto a conservative fuel map and lose a small amount of pace. On lap 10, Barrichello began to drop back with a cramp in his right foot, and was advised over the radio by Ferrari's technical director Ross Brawn to consume more water and move his toes, causing Barrichello to brake earlier than expected. Two laps later, Coulthard attempted an unsuccessful pass on Bernoldi at Tabac corner. Häkkinen's car began to pull to the right on lap 13, and Barrichello overtook him at the exit of the tunnel for second. He entered the pit lane on lap 14 to have his car's suspension push rods checked by his mechanics and was stationary for 50 seconds. No damage was found. On the same lap, Panis retired with a steering problem, and Häkkinen did the same two laps later because his problem persisted.

In the meantime, Verstappen got ahead of Button for 12th on lap 15. Button retook the position temporarily soon after as Verstappen re-passed him. Coulthard continued to duel Bernoldi for position but still could not effect a pass, causing him to lap slower than normal. On the 18th lap, tenth-placed De la Rosa had an hydraulics issue losing him gearbox and throttle control. He pulled off at the side of the track to retire on the next lap. On lap 26, Burti, who had a long brake pedal, missed the Sainte Devote corner braking point. He stopped away from the barrier and he retired when his reverse gear failed. Coulthard tried again to overtake Bernoldi on the next lap but the latter defended his position. That allowed Michael Schumacher to lap Coulthard, who could not use the situation to pass Bernoldi. On lap 31, Trulli retired from fifth at La Rascasse turn with flames coming from the rear of his car due to a loss of engine hydraulic pressure. That elevated Fisichella to sixth. As Coulthard allowed Barrichello to lap him on lap 32, he sought to use the opportunity to pass Bernoldi but he could not do so. Two laps later, Fisichella entered Sainte Devote corner too fast, and struck a barrier with his rear wheel. He nonetheless continued in sixth, ahead of Alesi, because his car's suspension was undamaged.

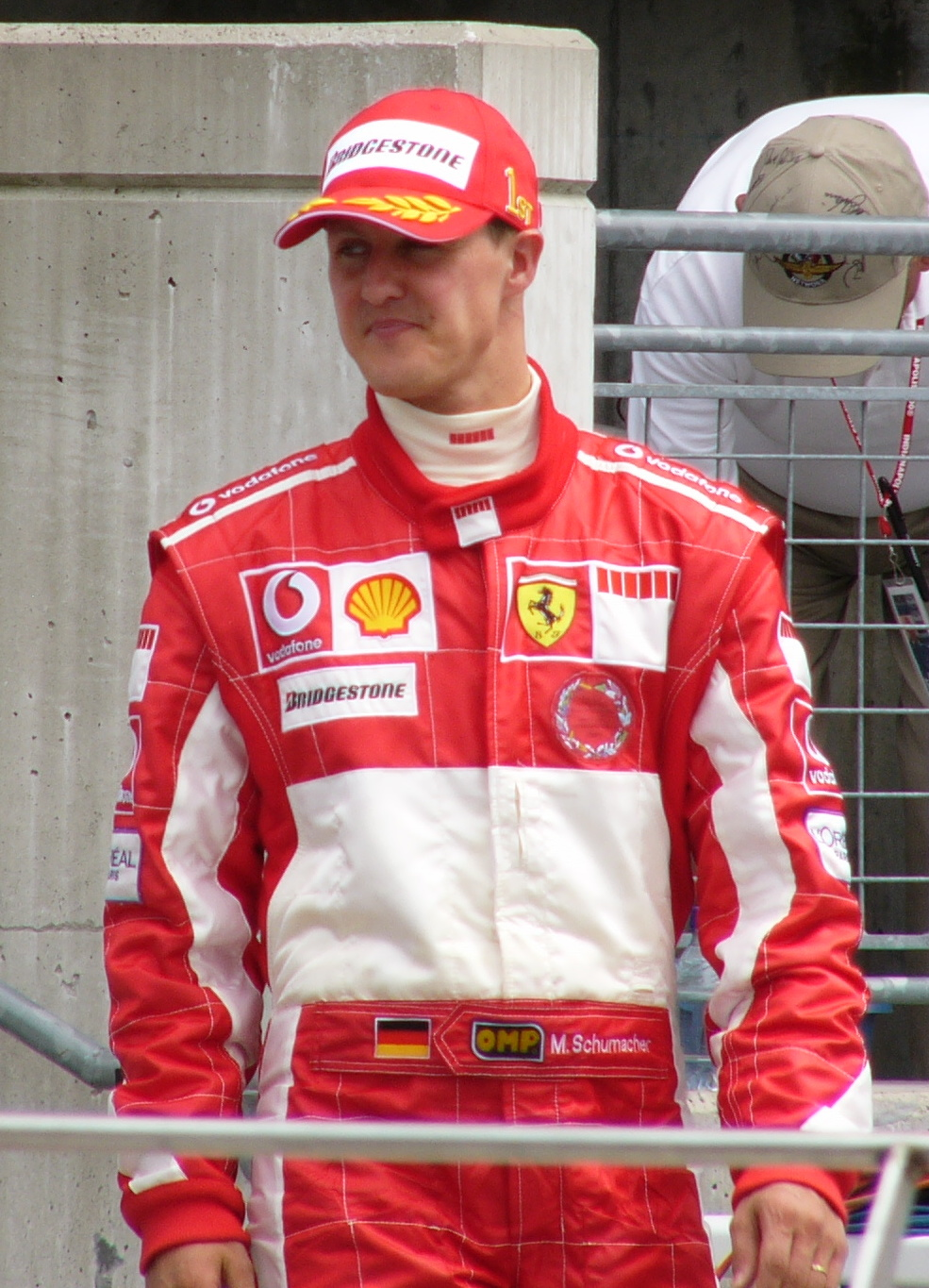
Michael Schumacher (pictured in 2005) won his fourth race of the season, his fifth at the Monaco Grand Prix and the 48th of his career.

Michael Schumacher set a new official lap record of 1:20.770 on the 38th lap. He further improved it to a time of 1:20.422 four laps later, extending his lead over his teammate Barrichello to 18.3 seconds. On lap 43, Fisichella had an hydraulic failure that caused his gearbox to fail, and he crashed into the tyre wall at Sainte Devote, removing the front left wheel from his car. Bernoldi had less fuel in his car than Coulthard's and made a pit stop at the end of the following lap, allowing Coulthard to lap 4.5 seconds faster than before. He took advantage of Alonso being lapped by Villeneuve to pass the latter for ninth on lap 48. Two laps later, Frentzen in seventh understeered at the apex and he drifted into a left-hand Armco metal barrier exiting the tunnel at 270 km/h (170 mph). He slid along the barrier before stopping at the Novelle Chicane and clambered out of his car unhurt. Alesi entered the pit lane on lap 51, and returned to the race still in sixth. Four laps later, Michael Schumacher made his pit stop from the lead, promoting his teammate Barrichello into first. Further down the order, Alonso retired with a failed gearbox on lap 57. Ralf Schumacher retired from third position in the pit lane on the next lap with an electrical fault that switched off his engine.

Irvine was promoted to third, Villeneuve fourth, Alesi fifth and Coulthard sixth. Barrichello made his pit stop from first position on lap 60, returning the lead to his teammate Michael Schumacher. That lap, Irvine made his pit stop and retained third place, and then Marques' driveshaft broke and he drove onto the run-off area at the Novelle Chicane to retire. Six laps later, Coulthard made his pit stop and emerged in front of Button in sixth. He then set the race's overall fastest lap at 1 minute and 19.424 seconds on the 68th lap as he drew closer to Alesi in fifth. Prost reacted by calling Alesi into the pit lane on the next lap for new tyres to better his defence of fifth. However, Alesi was delayed and he rejoined the race behind Coulthard in sixth. Michael Schumacher led the last nine laps to take his fourth victory from the seven races held thus far in the season and the 48th of his career, by 0.431 seconds over Barrichello in a staged finish. (Note: It was Ferrari's final victory at the Monaco Grand Prix until Sebastian Vettel won the 2017 race.) Irvine achieved Jaguar's first podium finish since its debut in Formula One and its first points score of the season in third, ahead of the faster Villeneuve in fourth. Coulthard finished a lap behind in fifth, being approximately a minute behind Villeneuve, and Alesi took sixth, earning Prost's first championship point of the season. Button took seventh after coping with an understeer which developed into an oversteer and could not draw closer to Alesi, who was 28 seconds ahead of him at the finish. Verstappen and Bernoldi followed in positions eight to nine. Räikkönen was five laps down and the last finisher in tenth after an early race pit stop to rectify a wheel sensor failure and he had no traction control. The attrition rate was high with 12 of the 22 drivers not finishing the race due to accidents and mechanical trouble. Michael Schumacher led all but five laps of a processional race.

=== Post-race ===
The top three drivers appeared in Prince Rainier III of Monaco's royal box to collect their trophies and appeared in the subsequent press conference to speak to the media. Michael Schumacher said he felt little emotion on the podium because he took "a very straightforward win" and that finishing the race was the most important aspect because the circuit is narrow, "Although it was an easy drive, it was still hard to some degree, because we were still doing reasonably fast lap times. I don't know what it so special." Barrichello stated his cramp disappeared after his pit stop, "I was asking God to give me a chance to race because the car was brilliant. I never had a car as good as this one of today. But as Michael was saying, I had to save so much because I couldn't do anything else." Irvine spoke of his delight to finish third and stated his hope to continue Jaguar's form into the Canadian Grand Prix, "It's good for all the guys in the team. Everyone's been working very hard. We haven't been getting very far to be honest until these new aerodynamics arrived on Saturday so it's good for the guys in factory."

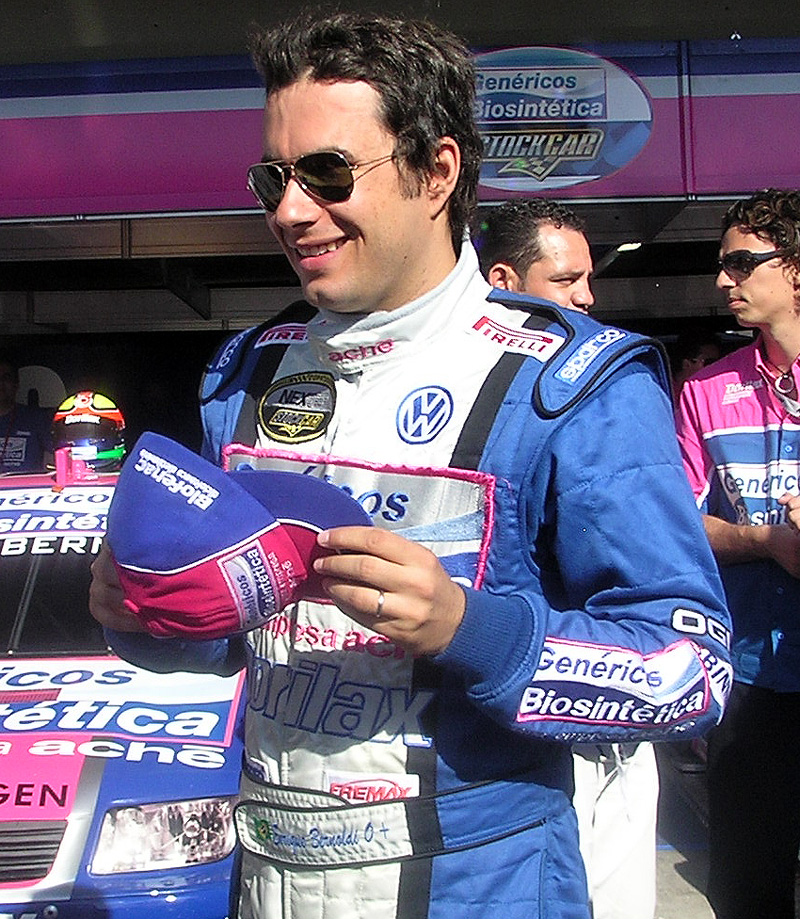
Enrique Bernoldi (pictured in 2007) claimed that McLaren threatened to shorten his career after delaying the faster Coulthard for 35 laps.

Bernoldi, who battled Coulthard for 35 laps, alleged that the McLaren team principal Ron Dennis and the director of motorsport for Mercedes-Benz Norbert Haug had approached him and threatened to shorten his career if a similar scenario occurred in the future, a claim that Dennis denied, "It was quite a while after the race when I talked to him and I was cool, calm, and collected and I was not angry. I just told him that in my opinion it was unsporting behaviour." An audio tape released to the press by McLaren on 11 June vindicated Dennis; according to transcribers he said to Bernoldi, "that was not sporting and you shouldn't carry on like that." Bernoldi told Dennis he was following orders and was not required to allow Coulthard past since the latter was on the same lap as the former. The Arrows team principal Tom Walkinshaw rejected a claim by Dennis that Bernoldi would not permit Coulthard to pass Bernoldi for television exposure. Coulthard spoke of his belief that Bernoldi was over defensive and said he would raise the issue at the next Grand Prix Drivers' Association meeting, "We agreed not to move once a driver has made his move. You make your decision – and up the hill a couple of times I was coming to get my wheels alongside him and he moved over." Bernoldi argued he was driving a routine race and was on the circuit to better his driving ability.

After the race, the FIA examined several Bridgestone tyres for possible illegal wear. It discovered nothing abnormal and the result of the race was declared final. Jackie Stewart, the three-time Formula One World Champion and Jaguar team founder, praised Irvine's performance and the driver's maturity, "He practised well, he qualified well and he raced well. You couldn't ask for more. He proved himself here by driving in a very controlled way so he was ready to take advantage of opportunities and to resist any pressure from Jacques (Villeneuve) at the end." Villeneuve commented on his fourth-place result: "It's always a tough race and easy to make a mistake, so to finish fourth with a car that was a little bit slower is great." Alesi earned his first championship points finish since coming sixth in the 1999 Japanese Grand Prix and the Prost team's first since Trulli's second-place result at the 1999 European Grand Prix. He declared the result "a great thing" for himself and Prost and said that he predicted similar results in the future, "I totally enjoyed my race. But towards the end, when I felt the car vibrating in the tunnel, I was really worried. It was a flat tyre and I had to go back to the pits to change it, which cost me the fifth place points. What is really important today is that I scored the first point for the team this year – or last."

The race victory increased Michael Schumacher's lead in the World Drivers' Championship to 12 championship points over Coulthard. Barrichello consolidated third position as Ralf Schumacher's non-finish kept him in fourth. Heidfeld was in fifth place. In the World Constructors' Championship, Ferrari increased their advantage over McLaren to 32 championship points. Williams and Jordan still held third and fourth places and Sauber were fifth with ten races remaining in the season.

=== Race classification ===
Drivers who scored championship points are denoted in bold.

Pos	No.	Driver	Constructor	Tyre	Laps	Time/Retired	Grid	Points
1	1	(Germany) **Michael Schumacher**	**Ferrari**	B	78	1:47:22.561	2	10
2	2	(Brazil) **Rubens Barrichello**	**Ferrari**	B	78	+0.431	4	6
3	18	(United Kingdom) **Eddie Irvine**	**Jaguar-Cosworth**	M	78	+30.698	6	4
4	10	(Canada) **Jacques Villeneuve**	**BAR-Honda**	B	78	+32.454	9	3
5	4	(United Kingdom) **David Coulthard**	**McLaren-Mercedes**	B	77	+1 lap	1^{1}	2
6	22	(France) **Jean Alesi**	**Prost-Acer**	M	77	+1 lap	11	1
7	8	(United Kingdom) Jenson Button	Benetton-Renault	M	77	+1 lap	17	
8	14	(Netherlands) Jos Verstappen	Arrows-Asiatech	B	77	+1 lap	19	
9	15	(Brazil) Enrique Bernoldi	Arrows-Asiatech	B	76	+2 laps	20	
10	17	(Finland) Kimi Räikkönen	Sauber-Petronas	B	73	+5 laps	15	
Ret	5	(Germany) Ralf Schumacher	Williams-BMW	M	57	Electrical	5	
Ret	20	(Brazil) Tarso Marques	Minardi-European	M	56	Transmission	22	
Ret	21	(Spain) Fernando Alonso	Minardi-European	M	54	Gearbox	18	
Ret	11	(Germany) Heinz-Harald Frentzen	Jordan-Honda	B	49	Accident	13	
Ret	7	(Italy) Giancarlo Fisichella	Benetton-Renault	M	43	Gearbox/accident	10	
Ret	12	(Italy) Jarno Trulli	Jordan-Honda	B	30	Hydraulics/engine	8	
Ret	23	(Brazil) Luciano Burti	Prost-Acer	M	24	Gearbox	21	
Ret	19	(Spain) Pedro de la Rosa	Jaguar-Cosworth	M	18	Hydraulics	14	
Ret	3	(Finland) Mika Häkkinen	McLaren-Mercedes	B	15	Steering	3	
Ret	9	(France) Olivier Panis	BAR-Honda	B	13	Steering	12	
Ret	6	(Colombia) Juan Pablo Montoya	Williams-BMW	M	2	Accident	7	
Ret	16	(Germany) Nick Heidfeld	Sauber-Petronas	B	0	Collision	16	

Notes

- **^1** – David Coulthard started the race from the back of the grid after stalling on the formation lap.

== Championship standings after the race ==
Drivers' Championship standings

+/–	Pos	Driver	Points
	1	(Germany) Michael Schumacher	52
	2	(United Kingdom) David Coulthard	40
	3	(Brazil) Rubens Barrichello	24
	4	(Germany) Ralf Schumacher	12
	5	(Germany) Nick Heidfeld	8

Constructors' Championship standings

+/–	Pos	Constructor	Points
	1	(Italy) Ferrari	76
	2	(United Kingdom) McLaren-Mercedes	44
	3	(United Kingdom) Williams-BMW	18
	4	(Republic of Ireland) Jordan-Honda	13
1	5	(United Kingdom) BAR-Honda	12
Sources:

- Note: Only the top five positions are included for both sets of standings.

== Notes and references ==
=== References ===
Previous race: 2001 Austrian Grand Prix	FIA Formula One World Championship; 2001 season	Next race: 2001 Canadian Grand Prix
Previous race: 2000 Monaco Grand Prix	Monaco Grand Prix	Next race: 2002 Monaco Grand Prix
