= 2001 Canadian Grand Prix =

Race 8 of 17 in the 2001 Formula One World Championship
| ← Previous race | Next race → |

Race details
- Date: 10 June 2001
- Official name: Grand Prix Air Canada 2001
- Location: Circuit Gilles Villeneuve, Montreal, Quebec, Canada
- Course: Street circuit
- Course length: 4.421 km (2.747 miles)
- Distance: 69 laps, 305.049 km (189.549 miles)
- Weather: Sunny

Pole position
| Driver | (Germany) Michael Schumacher | Ferrari |
- Time: 1:15.782

Fastest lap
| Driver | (Germany) Ralf Schumacher | Williams-BMW |
- Time: 1:17.205 on lap 50

Podium
| First | (Germany) Ralf Schumacher | Williams-BMW |
| Second | (Germany) Michael Schumacher | Ferrari |
| Third | (Finland) Mika Häkkinen | McLaren-Mercedes |

The 2001 Canadian Grand Prix (formally the Grand Prix Air Canada 2001) was a Formula One motor race held on 10 June 2001 at the Circuit Gilles Villeneuve in Montreal, Quebec, Canada in front of a crowd of 111,000 people. It was the eighth round of the 2001 Formula One World Championship and the 33rd Canadian Grand Prix as part of the Formula One World Championship. Williams driver Ralf Schumacher won the 69-lap race starting from second position. Ferrari's Michael Schumacher finished second and McLaren's Mika Häkkinen took third.

Going into the race, Michael Schumacher led the World Drivers' Championship from McLaren's David Coulthard and Ferrari led McLaren in the World Constructors' Championship. Michael Schumacher won the 38th pole position of his career by posting the fastest lap in qualifying and he maintained his lead going into the first corner. He opened up his lead to 1.1 seconds until Ralf Schumacher's tyres reached their optimum operating temperatures and he lowered his advantage to four-tenths of a second until a safety car was required on lap 20 for separate accidents for Rubens Barrichello and Juan Pablo Montoya. It was on track for the next three laps although Michael Schumacher extended his lead once again at the restart, Ralf Schumacher again reduced it as he sought his way past on the track but he did so after the pit stop cycle on lap 51. Ralf Schumacher held the lead for the last 18 laps to claim his second victory of the season and it marked the first time siblings had finished first and second in a Formula One race.

The result of the race meant Michael Schumacher increased his lead at the top of the World Drivers' Championship to 18 championship points ahead of Coulthard who retired due to an engine failure in the final 15 laps of the race. Barrichello maintained third position despite his crash, Ralf Schumacher stayed in fourth and Häkkinen completed the top five. Ferrari increased their advantage over McLaren in the World Constructors' Championship to 38 championship points and Williams retained third with nine rounds left in the season.

== Background ==
The 2001 Canadian Grand Prix was the eighth of seventeen scheduled races of the 2001 Formula One World Championship and the 33rd edition of the event as part of the Formula One World Championship. It was held on 10 June at the 4.421 km (2.747 mi) 13-turn temporary road course Circuit Gilles Villeneuve in Montreal, Quebec and was run over 69 laps. For the race, the Fédération Internationale de l'Automobile (FIA; Formula One's governing body) race director Charlie Whiting made a request to Canadian Grand Prix president Normand Legault to install two-inch "ribs" behind the kerbs at turns 12 and 13 to try and convince racers to alter their trajectory through the chicane to improve their chances of their cars not sustaining damage. The Ferrari Challenge, Formula Ford 1600 and the Toyota Atlantic Championship held support races during the weekend.

Going into the race, Ferrari driver Michael Schumacher led the World Drivers' Championship with 52 championship points, ahead of the second-placed David Coulthard of McLaren (40) and Rubens Barrichello in the second Ferrari (24) in third. Williams' Ralf Schumacher was in fourth on 12 championship points and Nick Heidfeld of Sauber was fifth with eight championship points. Ferrari led the World Constructors' Championship with 76 championship points; McLaren and Williams were second and third with 44 and 18 championship points respectively. Jordan with 13 championship points and Sauber with 12 contended for fourth place.

After the Monaco Grand Prix on 27 May, all of the teams conducted in-season testing at various European racing circuits, testing tyres, racing setups and car components in preparation for the Canadian Grand Prix. Ten of the eleven teams held a three-day test session at the Circuit de Nevers Magny-Cours in France. Ralf Schumacher was fastest on the first and second days. Marc Gené, Williams's test driver, set the pace on the third and final day. Three squads spent three days at the Monza Circuit in Italy, with Sauber's Kimi Räikkönen leading on the first day, and Williams's Juan Pablo Montoya was fastest on the final two days. Luca Badoer, Ferrari's test driver, spent three days at the Fiorano Circuit, Ferrari's private circuit, shaking down three F2001 chassis that were transported to the Canadian Grand Prix as well as performing practice starts and testing car components.

Michael Schumacher had won the Canadian Grand Prix four times in his career up until the 2001 race. He and spoke of his confidence that he could win at the Circuit Gilles Villeneuve for the fifth time despite his dislike of the track due to his preference of high-speed corners, "The records I have in Montreal are good but that means nothing now as it is a new challenge. We need to be prepared to do a good job. It will be a tight competition between us and probably McLaren and Williams, and anyone else who has improved a lot." His brother Ralf Schumacher stated that he hoped to extend his points tally after a poor performance at the preceding Monaco Grand Prix, "I think the Circuit Giles [sic] Villeneuve could be pretty favourable to our car as we have a powerful engine, which is essential there. It's not particularly demanding on the drivers, as it is basically a "stop-and-go" track. I like Montreal and I am looking forward to being there, hoping this time I will be able to finish my race and be in the points."

There were eleven teams (each representing a different constructor) with two drivers each for the event. For the race, most teams concentrated on their braking systems, elements that are highly stressed on the Circuit Gilles Villeneuve, which is characterised by multiple sharp braking sections. In particular, Sauber, Jordan and Arrows brought brake air intake fairings similar to those introduced by Ferrari since the Australian Grand Prix; Sauber did not use their new air intake fairings for the race itself.

== Practice ==
A total of four practice sessions preceded Sunday's race—two one-hour sessions on Thursday, and two 45-minute sessions on Saturday. Conditions were dry and sunny for the Friday practice sessions. Coulthard was fastest in the first practice session on Friday morning with a time of 1:18.763, almost four-tenths of a second faster than Barrichello in second. His teammate Michael Schumacher was third and was fastest before Coulthard's and Barrichello's late session laps. Mika Häkkinen, Olivier Panis, Heidfeld, Jarno Trulli, Räikkönen, Ralf Schumacher and Montoya completed the top ten. Jacques Villeneuve lost control of the rear of his BAR leaving turn five and struck the barriers lining the circuit at the next corner due to a suspension failure at almost 150 mph (240 km/h), heavily damaging his car against the guardrail; the car rested upon a tyre wall. Villeneuve and no one else was unhurt but he was forced to miss the remainder of the session since his car was destroyed; rules prohibited drivers from using the spare car during free practice and were only able to drive spare cars from the start of qualifying. This came after Villeneuve drove behind Montoya and overtook him before stopping in front of him heading into the L'Epingle hairpin. Montoya felt Villeneuve had "brake-tested" him but Villeneuve blamed Montoya. In the second practice session held later in the afternoon on a cleaner circuit than at the beginning of the preceding session, Häkkinen set the day's fastest lap with the only sub-1:18 time at 1:17.692, breaking the circuit record set by Michael Schumacher in 1997. He was followed by his teammate Coulthard, Eddie Irvine, Barrichello, Montoya, Ralf Schumacher, Heidfeld, Trulli, Heinz-Harald Frentzen and Panis.

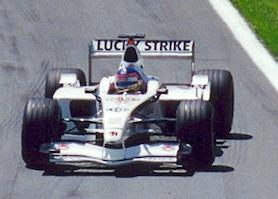
Jacques Villeneuve had an altercation with Juan Pablo Montoya for which both drivers were warned a similar incident would result in a ban of two races.

At the drivers' briefing later on Friday, Montoya reportedly threatened to place Villeneuve in the wall and Villeneuve responded by saying he would put Montoya in a tree. Montoya then told Villeneuve that he "killed" marshal Graham Beveridge in a crash at the season-opening Australian Grand Prix three months earlier. His remark prompted Villeneuve to grab Montoya by the collar on his racing overalls in an attempt to choke him, causing FIA race director Charlie Whiting to intervene to stop the altercation. Both drivers were later summoned into a meeting where Whiting warned them that they would face a ban of two races in the event of future altercations. After a heavy accident with the tyre barrier at the entry to turn three in the closing moments of the second practice session as well as the consequences of his crash at Monaco that was measured at 18 g, Frentzen complained of double vision and headaches and he withdrew from the race to travel to a clinic in Nice for tests to his vision and balance. His car was taken over by Jordan test and reserve driver Ricardo Zonta for the remainder of the weekend after the stewards granted Jordan's request under the Formula One Sporting Code.

Weather conditions were sunny for the third practice session held on Saturday morning. Häkkinen led the session with a lap time of 1:16.628 set in the final minutes. His teammate Coulthard was 0.047 seconds slower in second and Michael Schumacher was third. Barrichello, Ralf Schumacher, Irvine, Heidfeld, Pedro de la Rosa, Räikkönen and Panis filled positions four through ten. Trulli spun at the L'Epingle hairpin and took nearly five minutes to engage reverse gear before driving into the pit lane. In the final practice session, which took place in clear conditions and saw drivers make final adjustments to their qualifying setups, Michael Schumacher was fastest with a 1:16.200 lap. Coulthard in the faster of the two McLarens came second and his teammate Häkkinen was third. Following in the top ten were Barrichello, the Sauber duo of Heidfeld and Räikkönen, Panis, Ralf Schumacher, Trulli and De la Rosa. Zonta's brakes snatched away and he ran into the gravel trap beside the circuit 16 minutes into practice and Jean Alesi spun and stalled his car 20 minutes later. Häkkinen braked too late for the L'Epingle hairpin and got his McLaren stuck in the gravel trap at the end of the session.

== Qualifying ==
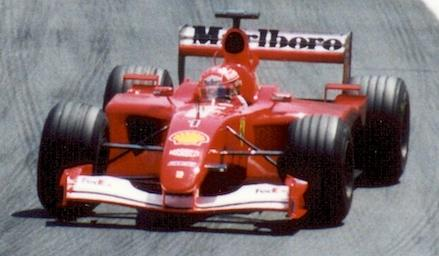
Michael Schumacher had his sixth pole position in Montréal and the 38th of his career.

Saturday's afternoon one hour qualifying session saw each driver limited to twelve laps, with the grid order decided by their fastest laps. During this session, the 107% rule was in effect, which necessitated each driver to set a time within 107 per cent of the quickest lap to qualify for the race. Conditions were warm and sunny for qualifying. 27 minutes into qualifying, Michael Schumacher took the 38th pole position of his career with a 1:15.782 lap that he set on his sixth timed lap with 12 minutes remaining, the only driver to set a sub-1:16 time. His brother Ralf Schumacher was 0.515 seconds slower in second and set his best time on the harder Michelin compound on his ninth try 38 minutes in after he heavily altered his racing set-up. Coulthard ran wide at the final chicane during his first timed lap but improved in the final sector on his last try late in the session for third, moving from fourth and demoting Trulli to the position. Trulli was ordered to parc fermé at the entry of the pit lane and he felt it prevented him from bettering his time due to the long amount of time he was kept there by marshals. Barrichello qualified fifth but he was the cause of the first red flag when he lost control of his Ferrari, launched over the kerbing at the final chicane leading onto the start/finish straight and hit the Wall of Champions sideways with the Ferrari's right-hand side 40 minutes into the session. He was unhurt and he returned to the pit lane to drive the spare Ferrari F2001 optimised for his teammate Michael Schumacher, while marshals spent five minutes cleaning the track of debris and removing Barrichello's stricken car. Barrichello's fastest time was recorded on his last run. Panis took sixth, qualifying ahead of teammate Villeneuve for the fourth time in the season. Räikkönen understeered on the run into the L'Epingle hairpin and narrowly avoided the Wall of Champions after going airborne over the kerbs at the final turn. Häkkinen switched to the spare McLaren MP4-16 optimised for his teammate Coulthard after damaging his main car's right-hand side radiator and undertray by aggressively launching over the high kerb at the final corner but a misfiring engine restricted him to eighth.

Villeneuve and Montoya rounded out the top ten qualifiers. Heidfeld was the fastest competitor not to qualify in the top ten because his best lap time was 1.383 seconds slower than Michael Schumacher's pole lap and Heidfeld triggered the second stoppage with a minute and 35 seconds remaining when he crashed heavily at the final chicane and debris and Heidfeld's stricken vehicle needed to be removed from the circuit. Although Heidfeld was unhurt, his car's monocoque was rebuilt for the race. Zonta achieved his team principal Eddie Jordan's prediction qualifying 12th and made a driving error on the approach to the first corner. Jos Verstappen begun from 13th. The Jaguar pair of De la Rosa and Irvine placed 14th and 15th and the former slowed and he was almost hit by Irvine (whom he qualified ahead for the first time in the season) leaving the final chicane. Alesi had brake instability and a lack of traction en route to 16th and his Prost teammate Luciano Burti could not optimise his car's handling for 19th. On his maiden appearance at the circuit, Enrique Bernoldi qualified 17th and Giancarlo Fisichella took 18th in the faster of the two Benettons as he picked up a large amount of understeer due to changes in the track surface and changed his car's downforce for better straightline speed. Jenson Button had an excessive amount of understeer and he took 20th. The Minardis of Fernando Alonso and Tarso Marques occupied the final row of the grid in 21st and 22nd; Alonso dove into the gravel trap at the first turn during his first timed lap. Improvements to engines, chassis and tyre technology across the entire grid allowed 15 drivers to lap faster than Michael Schumacher's 1997 pole lap time.

=== Post-qualifying ===
After qualifying, Alonso had all of his qualifying times disallowed because the front wing on his car was found by scrutineers to be less than 100 mm (3.9 in) above the regulation reference plate.

=== Qualifying classification ===
| Pos | No. | Driver | Constructor | Lap | Gap | Grid |
|---|---|---|---|---|---|---|
| 1 | 1 | (Germany) Michael Schumacher | Ferrari | 1:15.782 | — | 1 |
| 2 | 5 | (Germany) Ralf Schumacher | Williams-BMW | 1:16.297 | +0.515 | 2 |
| 3 | 4 | (United Kingdom) David Coulthard | McLaren-Mercedes | 1:16.423 | +0.641 | 3 |
| 4 | 12 | (Italy) Jarno Trulli | Jordan-Honda | 1:16.459 | +0.677 | 4 |
| 5 | 2 | (Brazil) Rubens Barrichello | Ferrari | 1:16.760 | +0.978 | 5 |
| 6 | 9 | (France) Olivier Panis | BAR-Honda | 1:16.771 | +0.989 | 6 |
| 7 | 17 | (Finland) Kimi Räikkönen | Sauber-Petronas | 1:16.875 | +1.093 | 7 |
| 8 | 3 | (Finland) Mika Häkkinen | McLaren-Mercedes | 1:16.979 | +1.197 | 8 |
| 9 | 10 | (Canada) Jacques Villeneuve | BAR-Honda | 1:17.035 | +1.253 | 9 |
| 10 | 6 | (Colombia) Juan Pablo Montoya | Williams-BMW | 1:17.123 | +1.341 | 10 |
| 11 | 16 | (Germany) Nick Heidfeld | Sauber-Petronas | 1:17.165 | +1.383 | 11 |
| 12 | 11 | (Brazil) Ricardo Zonta | Jordan-Honda | 1:17.328 | +1.546 | 12 |
| 13 | 14 | (Netherlands) Jos Verstappen | Arrows-Asiatech | 1:17.903 | +2.121 | 13 |
| 14 | 19 | (Spain) Pedro de la Rosa | Jaguar-Cosworth | 1:18.015 | +2.233 | 14 |
| 15 | 18 | (United Kingdom) Eddie Irvine | Jaguar-Cosworth | 1:18.016 | +2.234 | 15 |
| 16 | 22 | (France) Jean Alesi | Prost-Acer | 1:18.178 | +2.396 | 16 |
| 17 | 15 | (Brazil) Enrique Bernoldi | Arrows-Asiatech | 1:18.575 | +2.793 | 17 |
| 18 | 7 | (Italy) Giancarlo Fisichella | Benetton-Renault | 1:18.622 | +2.840 | 18 |
| 19 | 23 | (Brazil) Luciano Burti | Prost-Acer | 1:18.753 | +2.971 | 19 |
| 20 | 8 | (United Kingdom) Jenson Button | Benetton-Renault | 1:19.033 | +3.251 | 20 |
| EX | 21 | (Spain) Fernando Alonso | Minardi-European | 1:19.454 | +3.672 | 22^{1} |
| 21 | 20 | (Brazil) Tarso Marques | Minardi-European | 1:20.690 | +4.908 | 21 |
107% time: 1:21.087

Notes

- ^1 — Fernando Alonso was excluded from qualifying due to an illegal front wing.

== Warm-up ==
On race morning, teams had a half-hour warm-up session to fine-tune their cars for the race in warm and sunny conditions. Panis ran faster than he had done during the weekend, setting the session's fastest lap of 1:18.512 seconds. Coulthard was the faster of the two McLarens in second and his teammate Häkkinen came fifth after the team rebuilt his car overnight. They were separated by Zonta and Irvine in third and fourth. Schumacher was sixth-fastest and concentrated on assessing two versions of front wings for his Ferrari and car set-up for the race. The top six drivers were separated by 0.15 seconds. Although warm-up was generally devoid of incident, Häkkinen braked too late for turn one and ran across the gravel trap but avoided hitting the tyre barrier.

== Race ==
The race began at 13:00 Eastern Standard Time (UTC+05:00). Weather conditions at the start were sunny and dry. The air temperature ranged from 25 to 26 °C (77 to 79 °F) and the track temperature was between 27 and 32 °C (81 and 90 °F); forecasts predicted no rainfall during the Grand Prix. A record crowd of 111,000 spectators attended the event, surpassing the previous record of 106,000 from the previous year. Engine stress and fuel consumption were the two main factors for the Grand Prix as the optimum strategy was one of a solitary pit stop. However, a driver in a lightly fuelled car could have an advantage over other drivers and this often resulted in less stress being put on the brakes. During the formation lap, Coulthard discovered a metal front suspension component moving about in the cockpit, causing handling difficulties. He was given the choice of making a pit stop but opted to take the start in spite of the risk of a suspension failure.

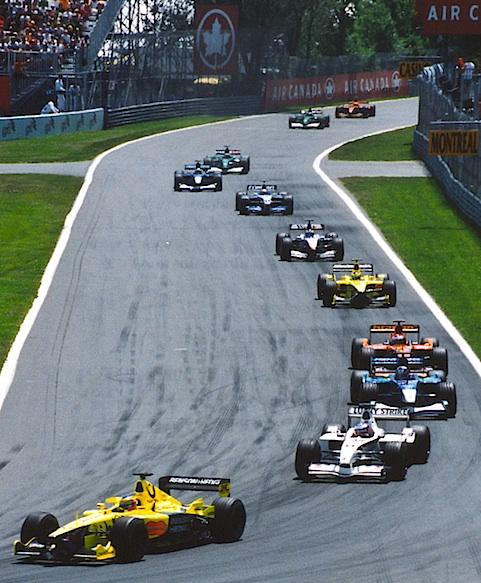
Jarno Trulli leads the midfield on the first lap of the race.

When the five red lights extinguished to commence the race, Michael Schumacher made a good start to hold the first position from Ralf Schumacher on the inside line going into the first corner. Coulthard in third place was heavily fuelled for a one-stop strategy and he led a close pack of cars. Verstappen was lightly fuelled and he gained seven places to move into seventh, while Zonta moved from twelfth to ninth. Barrichello overtook Trulli for fourth later in the lap. Further back in the field, Fisichella ran into the rear of Bernoldi's slower car at the L'Epingle hairpin and damaged the front wing on his car. Then, on the back straight, Button steered to the left to avoid striking Bernoldi but doing this meant his teammate Fisichella drove into the rear of his car. Fisichella's right-front suspension was broken and he drove into the pit lane to retire. At the end of the first lap, Michael Schumacher led Ralf Schumacher by three-tenths of a second. Following another six-tenths of a second in arrears was Coulthard and the three drivers completing the top six were Barrichello, Trulli and Panis.

On lap two, Irvine made contact with one of Heidfeld's rear tyres going into turn three and both drivers spun into the grass. Both drivers retired from the race because of the amount of damage to their cars. Marques was passed by Button for 15th on the same lap. Barrichello slipstreamed Coulthard on the Casino straight and he overtook him on the inside for third going into the final chicane at the end of the third lap. That same lap, Ralf Schumacher set the fastest lap of the race at that point at 1:20.797 seconds, until Barrichello bettered it by eight-tenths of a second on lap four to draw closer to him. In the meantime, Marques fell behind Alesi and Alonso. By the start of lap five, Michael Schumacher established a lead of a 1.1 seconds over Ralf Schumacher who was still being put under pressure by Barrichello.

Barrichello switched off his traction control system two laps earlier because it caused his engine to misfire. On the sixth lap, the lack of traction control caused Barrichello to lose control of the rear of his Ferrari while battling Ralf Schumacher and spin leaving the L'Epingle hairpin. He fell to 14th and his spin Coulthard returned to third place. Burti got ahead of Marques for 19th on that lap. Button was issued a ten-second stop-and-go penalty on lap seven because he was adjudged to have jumped the start. He took the penalty on the next lap. Alonso pulled off to the side of the circuit in the third sector with a broken driveshaft CV joint on lap eight. Bernoldi made the first pit stop of the Grand Prix on the ninth lap per the instruction of his team to remove a paper bag from his radiator to stop his engine from overheating. On laps 11 and 12, Barrichello passed Villeneuve and De la Rosa to move into 11th. At the front, Ralf Schumacher lowered Michael Schumacher's advantage to less than a second when his tyres reached their optimum operating temperatures and he further reduced his brother's lead to four-tenths of a second on lap 15. He continued to push hard to remain close by Michael Schumacher, hoping the latter would make a driver error. Button retired in the pit lane with an oil leak on lap 18.

The safety car was deployed on lap 20 when Montoya lost control of the rear of his car over a kerb and crashed into the wall at turn four alongside the circuit. Barrichello was close behind Montoya and his attempt to swerve to avoid hitting his car caused him to oversteer into the inside barrier after appearing to lock his brakes heavily. The safety car closed the field up, and allowed drivers to conserve their fuel usage by switching the fuel mixture to lean and by using seventh gear. It was withdrawn at the conclusion of lap 23 and Michael Schumacher maintained his lead over Ralf Schumacher at the rolling restart. Michael Schumacher opened out a lead of 2.6 seconds over Ralf Schumacher who could not match his pace due to extra tyre rubber he picked up under the safety car. Bernoldi retired in the pit lane on lap 26 because of an overheating engine. The following lap, Verstappen overtook Marques for 13th. De la Rosa attempted to overtake Häkkinen for eighth on the approach to the final corner on lap 27 but Häkkinen repelled the manoeuvre. Ralf Schumacher reduced Michael Schumacher's lead to 1.5 seconds by lap 30 and he further lowered it to 0.521 seconds two laps later. Further back on lap 34, Zonta and Räikkönen made contact on the back straight but both drivers continued without major damage to their cars. Räikkönen had sustained damage to the diffuser but was able to control his car. On the following lap, Villeneuve retired on the start/finish straight with a broken driveshaft after having earlier problems with his brakes.

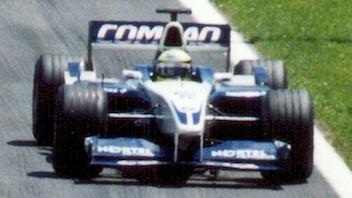
Ralf Schumacher took the second victory of his season and of his career. He and his brother Michael achieved the first one-two finish for siblings in Formula One.

On lap 35 Ralf Schumacher tried to overtake Michael Schumacher on the inside line but he backed out of the manoeuvre at the chicane. Häkkinen overtook Zonta, who was struggling with wear on the brakes, for seventh on the same lap. The following lap, Ralf Schumacher again tried to pass Michael Schumacher but this time by going around the outside of him and was unsuccessful. Häkkinen gained another position when he overtook his fellow Finnish driver Räikkönen entering the hairpin for sixth on lap 38. Panis retired on the same lap from a long brake pedal that prevented him from stopping his car. Green flag pit stops for tyres and fuel began that lap when Trulli entered the pit lane. Räikkönen and Alesi made pit stops over laps 39 and 41. In the meantime, Ralf Schumacher twice tried to overtake Michael Schumacher but he was unsuccessful on both attempts. Just as his teammate Häkkinen was about to pass, Coulthard made his pit stop from third on lap 42. Michael Schumacher made his pit stop four laps later and rejoined in second after an 8.4-second stop. This handed the lead to Ralf Schumacher who was able to run without aerodynamic turblence affecting his car and he increased his pace in his attempt to get ahead of his brother after his own stop by lowering the race track lap record three times. He entered the pit lane at the end of lap 51 and emerged 6.4 seconds in front of Michael Schumacher.

Four laps later, Coulthard's engine failed on the back straight because of rising water temperatures and entered the pit lane with smoke billowing from the rear of his car, curtailing his race. Trulli was afflicted by a brake hydraulic problem caused by a suspected master cylinder failure which caused his pace to lower and he was overtaken by Räikkönen, Alesi and Verstappen between laps 62 and 63. Trulli drove into the pit lane on lap 64 to retire. Three laps later, Verstappen spun into the tyre barrier due to a failure of left-front brake and was the final retirement of the Grand Prix. Verstappen's retirement promoted De la Rosa to sixth place. Unhindered in the final 15 laps, Ralf Schumacher was able to slow but he increased his lead to more than 20 seconds. He crossed the start/finish line after 69 laps to claim the second victory of the season and of his career after his maiden win at the San Marino Grand Prix two months earlier. Michael Schumacher finished in second, achieving the first one-two finish for siblings in a Grand Prix in the history of Formula One. Häkkinen completed the podium finishers in third, his first podium result of the season. His fellow Finnish driver Räikkönen finished in fourth position. Alesi took fifth for his second successive points-scoring finish and he was the final driver on the lead lap. De la Rosa completed the point-scoring drivers in sixth, his first points score of the season. The Brazilian trio of Zonta, Burti and Marques were the final finishers. The race was attritional, with only nine of the 22 starters finishing the race.

=== Post-race ===
The top three drivers appeared on the podium to collect their trophies and spoke to the media in a later press conference. Ralf Schumacher said that he and his brother had not competed against each other competitively in go-kart racing and that the Montréal was the first time of doing so, "It was obviously a great race today. The whole time the two of us together I was waiting for him to make a mistake. Obviously he didn't. I tried it a couple of times at the end of the straight but then it was difficult, so I waited for the pit strategy when I thought that we would go longer anyway and it worked out that way." Michael Schumacher spoke of a "happy family day" and stated that he was aware his brother was experienced enough not to make a driving error, "He obviously was close to overtaking but when you're inside, basically you have to brake a little bit earlier to make the corner and I was braking very late to try the maximum and as he said, he was going longer than I was, so I understand that he didn't take the maximum risk for either of us. It worked out for him." Häkkinen revealed that McLaren's objective was to finish in the top three but lamented that he could not get into the slipstream of the cars ahead of him due to the lack of acceleration from his car leaving the L'Epingle hairpin.

Frank Williams, owner of the Williams team, commented that he felt Ralf Schumacher's victory demonstrated that the driver as much as skill as his brother and Häkkinen, "Ralf is a natural winner who is going to get better and better and he gets older and more experienced. I remember telling people in the middle of 1999 that if Ralf was in a winning car, a Ferrari or a McLaren, he would already have won races. His manner of winning was exemplary." Williams technical director Patrick Head stated the team were not worried over the brakes. Although his engine failed, Coulthard was still confident of reducing the lead of Michael Schumacher in the Drivers' Championship over the rest of the season, "It (the title) is still achievable. But I can only do what I can do. Walking on water isn't something I've mastered yet. I think Ferrari still have a bit of a qualifying advantage because they use their tyres better but I still think we have a strong race car. I still believe I can win Grands Prix and be a challenge to Michael."

McLaren CEO Ron Dennis said that he was quite impressed with how Coulthard handled his suspension problem, "To have a problem like he had, to continue to race and maintain a strong pace requires a mixture of courage and tenacity." Alesi remarked that his fifth-place finish was the best birthday gift he could have received. Prost team owner Alain Prost stated that the squad had experienced "an intense happiness" over their performance in the race, adding, "More than just two essential points for us, this result is the confirmation of our performance in Monaco, of our motivation and our potential." Button and Fischella apologised to each other following their collision on the first lap and the technical director of Benetton Mike Gascoyne insisted that neither driver was to blame. Irvine said that he accepted "two-third of the blame" for his accident with Heidfeld on lap two. Heidfeld said Irvine was wholly responsible for the collision.

The result of the race meant Michael Schumacher maintained his lead at the top of the World Drivers' Championship with 58 championship points. Coulthard was still in second but his retirement meant Schumacher increased his lead to 18 championship points and Barrichello kept third position. Ralf Schumacher stayed in fourth position despite his victory and Häkkinen's podium finish allowed him to advance into fifth place in the standings. In the World Constructors' Championship, Ferrari increased their advantage over McLaren to 36 championship points. Williams maintained third with 28 championship points. Sauber overtook Jordan in the battle for fourth with nine rounds left in the season. At the FIA Prize Giving Ceremony in Monte Carlo on 15 December, the organiser of the Canadian Grand Prix, Normand Legault was awarded the prize of Best Promoter.

=== Race classification ===
Drivers who scored championship points are denoted in bold.

| Pos | No. | Driver | Constructor | Tyre | Laps | Time/Retired | Grid | Points |
|---|---|---|---|---|---|---|---|---|
| 1 | 5 | (Germany) **Ralf Schumacher** | **Williams-BMW** | M | 69 | 1:34:31.522 | 2 | 10 |
| 2 | 1 | (Germany) **Michael Schumacher** | **Ferrari** | B | 69 | +20.235 | 1 | 6 |
| 3 | 3 | (Finland) **Mika Häkkinen** | **McLaren-Mercedes** | B | 69 | +40.672 | 8 | 4 |
| 4 | 17 | (Finland) **Kimi Räikkönen** | **Sauber-Petronas** | B | 69 | +1:08.116 | 7 | 3 |
| 5 | 22 | (France) **Jean Alesi** | **Prost-Acer** | M | 69 | +1:10.435 | 16 | 2 |
| 6 | 19 | (Spain) **Pedro de la Rosa** | **Jaguar-Cosworth** | M | 68 | +1 Lap | 14 | 1 |
| 7 | 11 | (Brazil) Ricardo Zonta | Jordan-Honda | B | 68 | +1 Lap | 12 | |
| 8 | 23 | (Brazil) Luciano Burti | Prost-Acer | M | 68 | +1 Lap | 19 | |
| 9 | 20 | (Brazil) Tarso Marques | Minardi-European | M | 66 | +3 Laps | 21 | |
| 10 | 14 | (Netherlands) Jos Verstappen | Arrows-Asiatech | B | 65 | Brakes/Accident | 13 | |
| 11 | 12 | (Italy) Jarno Trulli | Jordan-Honda | B | 63 | Brakes | 4 | |
| Ret | 4 | (United Kingdom) David Coulthard | McLaren-Mercedes | B | 54 | Engine | 3 | |
| Ret | 9 | (France) Olivier Panis | BAR-Honda | B | 38 | Brakes | 6 | |
| Ret | 10 | (Canada) Jacques Villeneuve | BAR-Honda | B | 34 | Driveshaft | 9 | |
| Ret | 15 | (Brazil) Enrique Bernoldi | Arrows-Asiatech | B | 24 | Engine | 17 | |
| Ret | 6 | (Colombia) Juan Pablo Montoya | Williams-BMW | M | 19 | Accident | 10 | |
| Ret | 2 | (Brazil) Rubens Barrichello | Ferrari | B | 19 | Spun off | 5 | |
| Ret | 8 | (United Kingdom) Jenson Button | Benetton-Renault | M | 17 | Oil leak | 20 | |
| Ret | 21 | (Spain) Fernando Alonso | Minardi-European | M | 7 | Transmission | 22 | |
| Ret | 16 | (Germany) Nick Heidfeld | Sauber-Petronas | B | 1 | Collision | 11 | |
| Ret | 18 | (United Kingdom) Eddie Irvine | Jaguar-Cosworth | M | 1 | Collision | 15 | |
| Ret | 7 | (Italy) Giancarlo Fisichella | Benetton-Renault | M | 0 | Collision | 18 | |

== Championship standings after the race ==
Drivers' Championship standings

| +/– | Pos | Driver | Points |
|---|---|---|---|
| | 1 | (Germany) Michael Schumacher | 58 |
| | 2 | (United Kingdom) David Coulthard | 40 |
| | 3 | (Brazil) Rubens Barrichello | 24 |
| | 4 | (Germany) Ralf Schumacher | 22 |
| 8 | 5 | (Finland) Mika Häkkinen | 8 |

Constructors' Championship standings

| +/– | Pos | Constructor | Points |
|---|---|---|---|
| | 1 | (Italy) Ferrari | 82 |
| | 2 | (United Kingdom) McLaren-Mercedes | 48 |
| | 3 | (United Kingdom) Williams-BMW | 28 |
| 2 | 4 | (Switzerland) Sauber-Petronas | 15 |
| 1 | 5 | (Republic of Ireland) Jordan-Honda | 13 |

- Note: Only the top five positions are included for both sets of standings.

| Previous race: 2001 Monaco Grand Prix | FIA Formula One World Championship; 2001 season | Next race: 2001 European Grand Prix |
| Previous race: 2000 Canadian Grand Prix | Canadian Grand Prix | Next race: 2002 Canadian Grand Prix |
Awards
| Preceded by 2000 United States Grand Prix | Formula One Promotional Trophy for Race Promoter; 2001 | Succeeded by 2002 Hungarian Grand Prix |
