= 2001 Formula One World Championship =

55th season of FIA Formula One racing

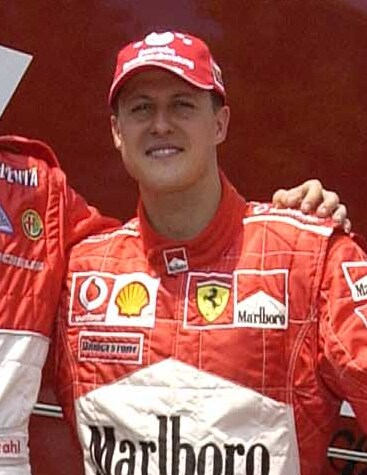
Michael Schumacher (pictured in 2003) won his second title in a row with Ferrari, his fourth overall.

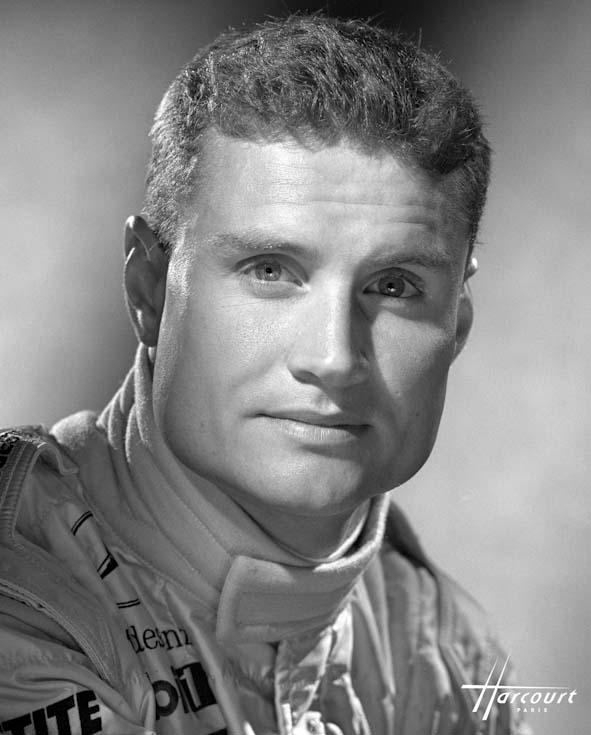
McLaren's David Coulthard (pictured in 1999) finished runner-up, 58 points behind.

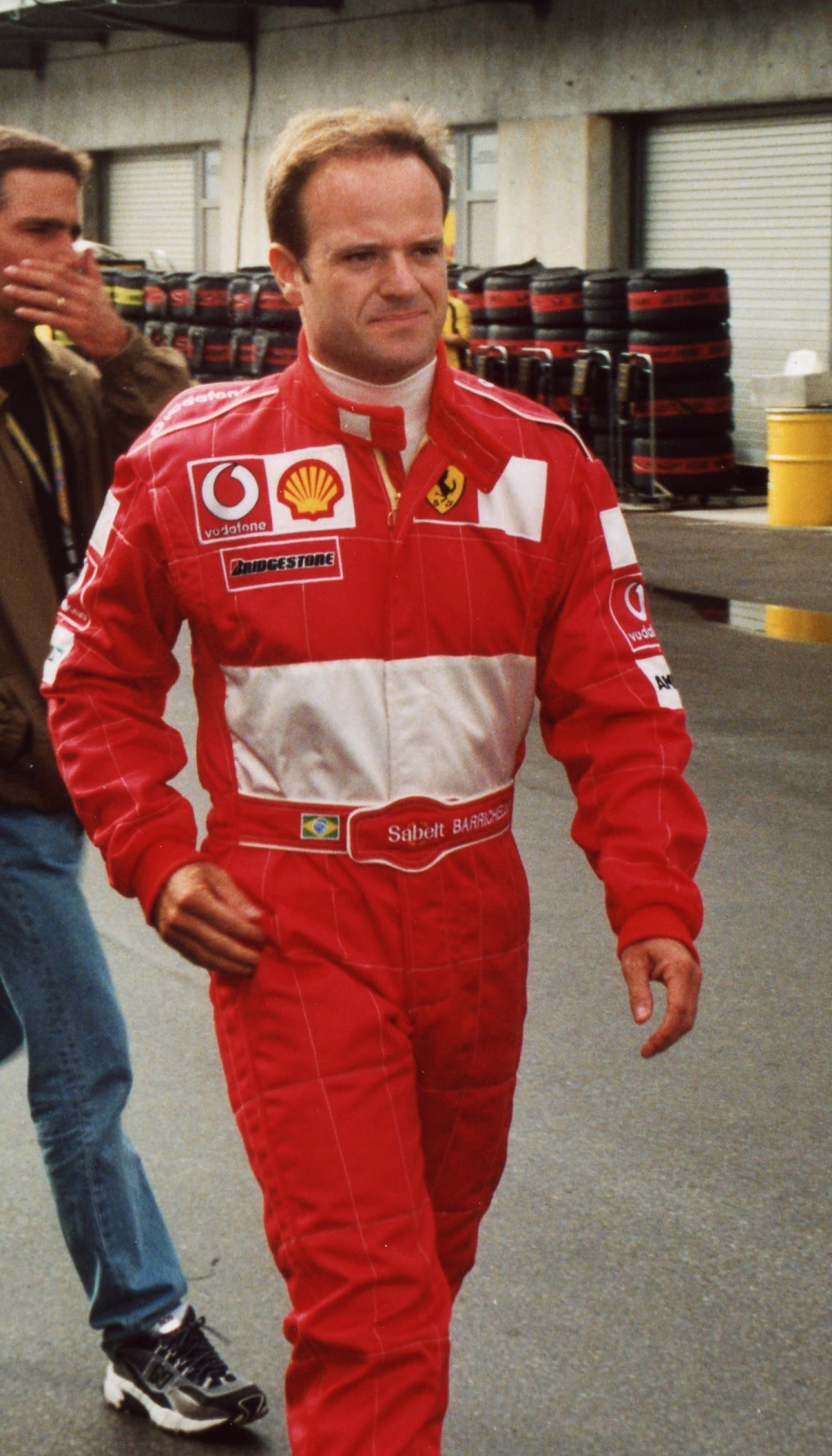
Schumacher's teammate, Rubens Barrichello (pictured in 2002), finished the season ranked third.

The 2001 FIA Formula One World Championship was the 55th season of FIA Formula One motor racing. It featured the 2001 Formula One World Championship for Drivers and the 2001 Formula One World Championship for Constructors, which were contested concurrently over a seventeen-race series that commenced on 4 March and ended on 14 October.

Defending champions Michael Schumacher and Scuderia Ferrari were again awarded the World Drivers' Championship and World Constructors' Championship, respectively. Schumacher won the title with a record margin of 58 points over David Coulthard (McLaren), after achieving nine victories and five second places. He also became the driver with the most wins thus far, with his victory at the Belgian Grand Prix marking his 52nd career win. The season saw the debut of two future world champions: Fernando Alonso and Kimi Räikkönen as well as race winner Juan Pablo Montoya. This was the last season for double world champion Mika Häkkinen. In addition, 2001 also saw French tyre manufacturer Michelin rejoin the sport for the first time since 1984 to provide competition for Japanese tyre supplier Bridgestone, beginning a tyre war between the two tyre companies that would last until the end of the 2006 season. The season also saw Renault rejoin the sport in an official capacity for the first time since 1997, with the French manufacturer purchasing the Benetton team which would be renamed Renault for 2002.

== Teams and drivers ==
The following teams and drivers competed in the 2001 FIA Formula One World Championship.

Entrant	Constructor	Chassis	Engine^{†}	Tyre	No.	Driver	Rounds
(Italy) Scuderia Ferrari Marlboro	Ferrari	F2001	Ferrari Tipo 050	B	1	(Germany) Michael Schumacher	All
(Italy) Scuderia Ferrari Marlboro	Ferrari	F2001	Ferrari Tipo 050	B	2	(Brazil) Rubens Barrichello	All
(United Kingdom) West McLaren Mercedes	McLaren-Mercedes	MP4-16	Mercedes FO110K	B	3	(Finland) Mika Häkkinen	All
(United Kingdom) West McLaren Mercedes	McLaren-Mercedes	MP4-16	Mercedes FO110K	B	4	(United Kingdom) David Coulthard	All
(United Kingdom) BMW WilliamsF1 Team	Williams-BMW	FW23	BMW P80	M	5	(Germany) Ralf Schumacher	All
(United Kingdom) BMW WilliamsF1 Team	Williams-BMW	FW23	BMW P80	M	6	(Colombia) Juan Pablo Montoya	All
(Italy) Mild Seven Benetton Renault	Benetton-Renault	B201	Renault RS21	M	7	(Italy) Giancarlo Fisichella	All
(Italy) Mild Seven Benetton Renault	Benetton-Renault	B201	Renault RS21	M	8	(United Kingdom) Jenson Button	All
(United Kingdom) Lucky Strike BAR Honda	BAR-Honda	003	Honda RA001E	B	9	(France) Olivier Panis	All
(United Kingdom) Lucky Strike BAR Honda	BAR-Honda	003	Honda RA001E	B	10	(Canada) Jacques Villeneuve	All
(Republic of Ireland) Benson & Hedges Jordan Honda	Jordan-Honda	EJ11	Honda RA001E	B	11	(Germany) Heinz-Harald Frentzen (Note: Heinz-Harald Frentzen was entered into the Canadian Grand Prix, but later withdrew after he was injured during free practice.)	1–11
(Republic of Ireland) Benson & Hedges Jordan Honda	Jordan-Honda	EJ11	Honda RA001E	B	11	(Brazil) Ricardo Zonta	8, 12
(Republic of Ireland) Benson & Hedges Jordan Honda	Jordan-Honda	EJ11	Honda RA001E	B	11	(Italy) Jarno Trulli	13–17
(Republic of Ireland) Benson & Hedges Jordan Honda	Jordan-Honda	EJ11	Honda RA001E	B	12	(Italy) Jarno Trulli	1–12
(Republic of Ireland) Benson & Hedges Jordan Honda	Jordan-Honda	EJ11	Honda RA001E	B	12	(France) Jean Alesi	13–17
(United Kingdom) Orange Arrows Asiatech	Arrows-Asiatech	A22	Asiatech 001	B	14	(Netherlands) Jos Verstappen	All
(United Kingdom) Orange Arrows Asiatech	Arrows-Asiatech	A22	Asiatech 001	B	15	(Brazil) Enrique Bernoldi	All
(Switzerland) Red Bull Sauber Petronas	Sauber-Petronas	C20	Petronas 01A	B	16	(Germany) Nick Heidfeld	All
(Switzerland) Red Bull Sauber Petronas	Sauber-Petronas	C20	Petronas 01A	B	17	(Finland) Kimi Räikkönen	All
(United Kingdom) HSBC Jaguar Racing F1 Team	Jaguar-Cosworth	R2	Cosworth CR-3	M	18	(United Kingdom) Eddie Irvine	All
(United Kingdom) HSBC Jaguar Racing F1 Team	Jaguar-Cosworth	R2	Cosworth CR-3	M	19	(Brazil) Luciano Burti	1–4
(United Kingdom) HSBC Jaguar Racing F1 Team	Jaguar-Cosworth	R2	Cosworth CR-3	M	19	(Spain) Pedro de la Rosa	5–17
(Italy) European Minardi F1	Minardi-European	PS01; PS01B	European	M	20	(Brazil) Tarso Marques	1–14
(Italy) European Minardi F1	Minardi-European	PS01; PS01B	European	M	20	(Malaysia) Alex Yoong	15–17
(Italy) European Minardi F1	Minardi-European	PS01; PS01B	European	M	21	(Spain) Fernando Alonso	All
(France) Prost Acer	Prost-Acer	AP04	Acer 01A	M	22	(France) Jean Alesi	1–12
(France) Prost Acer	Prost-Acer	AP04	Acer 01A	M	22	(Germany) Heinz-Harald Frentzen	13–17
(France) Prost Acer	Prost-Acer	AP04	Acer 01A	M	23	(Argentina) Gastón Mazzacane	1–4
(France) Prost Acer	Prost-Acer	AP04	Acer 01A	M	23	(Brazil) Luciano Burti	5–14
(France) Prost Acer	Prost-Acer	AP04	Acer 01A	M	23	(Czech Republic) Tomáš Enge	15–17

^{†} All engines were 3.0 litre, V10 configuration.

=== Driver changes ===
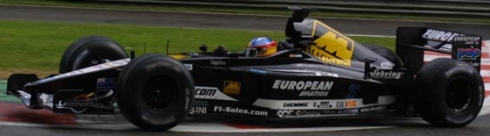
Fernando Alonso started his first season in Formula One with the Minardi team.

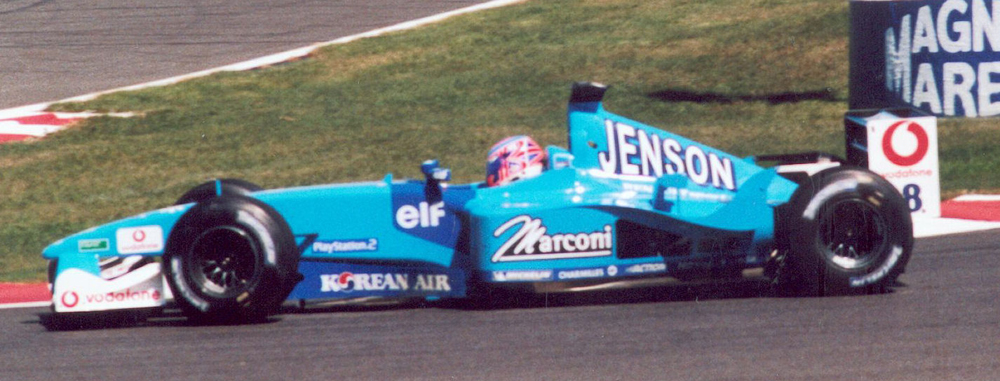
Jenson Button moved to the Benetton team because his Williams seat had been taken over by Juan Pablo Montoya.

- Olivier Panis left his test position with McLaren to take up a full-time drive with BAR. He took the place of Ricardo Zonta, with the Brazilian taking up the position of test driver with Jordan.
- Still on contract to Williams, Jenson Button was loaned to Benetton for this season. He replaced Alexander Wurz, as the Austrian had fallen out of favour with team boss Flavio Briatore and moved on to become a test driver at McLaren. Button's place in the Williams was taken over by Juan Pablo Montoya. Montoya had been tied to Williams since 1998 but was loaned to Chip Ganassi Racing to drive in the CART series in 1999, where he took the title in his first attempt as well as a victory in the Indianapolis 500.
- Marc Gené lost his seat at Minardi due to sponsorship problems. He signed a contract to become a test driver at Williams, where he remained until the end of 2004. His place at Minardi was replaced with Fernando Alonso. Gastón Mazzacane was replaced by Tarso Marques, returning after previously driving for the team in 1996 and 1997.
- Mazzacane beat CART driver Oriol Servià for the seat at Prost. He replaced Nick Heidfeld, who subsequently moved to Sauber. Kimi Räikkönen was signed alongside Heidfeld for a full drive from near obscurity. The Finn had performed some testing for Sauber in late 2000 after dominating the British Formula Renault series, and an impressed Peter Sauber offered him the full-time drive. Pedro Diniz did not return as a driver for Sauber, but instead purchased 40% of the Prost team and served in a management role there in 2001.
- Johnny Herbert decided to leave the Jaguar team in an attempt to secure a drive in Champ Cars. The deal did not work out and he was forced to sign on with Arrows as a test driver for 2001. Luciano Burti stepped up from test driver to fill Herbert's slot at Jaguar.
- Pedro de la Rosa lost his drive at Arrows to Enrique Bernoldi and signed on as a reserve driver with Prost.

==== Mid-season changes ====
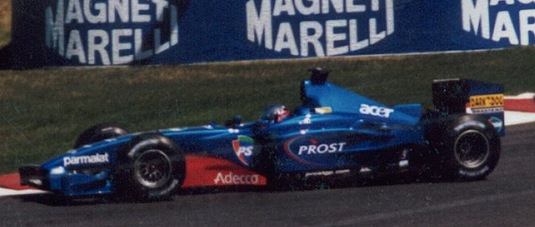
During the season, Jean Alesi quit his Prost drive and later joined the Jordan team.

- Gastón Mazzacane was fired by the Prost team after the San Marino Grand Prix. He was replaced with Jaguar's Luciano Burti, who, in turn, was subsequently replaced at Jaguar with Prost reserve driver Pedro de la Rosa.
- Heinz-Harald Frentzen suffered injuries after a crash and was replaced for the Canadian GP by reserve driver Ricardo Zonta. After returning from his injuries, Frentzen's contract was terminated by Jordan after the British GP. The split was not a happy one, and the matter ended in court before the end of the season. Zonta once again took over Frentzen's seat for the German GP.
- Jean Alesi left the Prost team after the German Grand Prix. Frentzen was then signed to Prost to take over Alesi's seat, before Jordan completed a straight swap by signing Alesi. Both drivers remained in their new seats for the rest of the season.
- Alex Yoong was granted his FIA super-licence during the 2001 season and replaced Tarso Marques in the Minardi starting lineup at the Italian Grand Prix. Marques moved into a reserve/test role for the rest of the season.
- Luciano Burti suffered serious injuries during a crash in the Belgian GP. He was forced to sit out the rest of the season and was replaced by Czech driver Tomáš Enge for the remaining races.

== Regulation changes ==
=== Technical regulations ===
- The front wing had to be moved upwards by 50 mm (2.0 in), to be at least 100 mm (3.9 in) above the "reference plane" (imaginary line along the bottom of the car). This was done to reduce the ground effect and overall downforce at the front of the car.
- The upper section of the rear wing could now only consist out of a maximum of three elements, and the lower point out of just one element.
- The safety cell and cockpit opening were increased in size to reduce damage to drivers' legs, and the roll hoop structure (above the driver's head) had to withstand a four times larger force of impact compared to last year. The side impact test was conducted at a higher speed: 10 m/s (33 ft/s) instead of 7 m/s (23 ft/s).
- Tyres had to be connected to the suspension with two tethers, up from one.

==== Mid-season changes ====
- Several electronic driver-aid systems were reintroduced: traction control, launch control, and fully-automatic transmissions. They had been banned since 1994. The Spanish Grand Prix was the first race where they were permitted.

=== Sporting regulations ===
- On 30 August 2000, the eleven teams held a meeting with members of the FIA at Heathrow Airport to discuss rule changes for the 2001 season. It was agreed that drivers would be allowed to use an extra three sets of tyres during Friday's two practice sessions.
- Ten days later at the Monza Circuit, team bosses accepted to ban in-season testing during the month of August, from the 2001 season onwards. A three-week break would be implemented during that time period.

=== Safety car ===
Mercedes-Benz provided a new safety car: the SL55 AMG, which also performed its duty during 2002 and replaced the previous CL55 AMG. It was first deployed during the German Grand Prix.

== Season summary ==
=== Pre-season ===
Three high-profile drivers made their debuts in 2001: future world champions Fernando Alonso (with Minardi) and Kimi Räikkönen (with Sauber), and former CART champion Juan Pablo Montoya (with Williams).

Renault returned to Formula One after three years to supply engines to the Benetton team. Meanwhile, fellow French car manufacturer Peugeot withdrew from the sport after seven years, following a disastrous 2000 season as engine supplier to Prost. The assets of Peugeot's Formula One programme were purchased by Asia Motor Technologies France. The 2000-spec powerplants were rebadged as Asiatechs and supplied to Arrows free of charge.

Michelin made a comeback as tyre supplier, providing competition to Bridgestone for the first time since Goodyear left the sport at the end of the 1998 season.

=== Rounds 1 to 4 ===
Michael Schumacher started the new season where he had left off the year before, with a dominant win from pole position in the first race in Australia. Arch-rival Mika Häkkinen lost second after a suspension failure, giving second to his teammate David Coulthard, with Schumacher's teammate Rubens Barrichello completing the podium. Kimi Räikkönen finished his first F1 race in the points with sixth place. The race was marred by the death of Graham Beveridge, a track marshal who was hit by debris after a collision between Ralf Schumacher and Jacques Villeneuve.

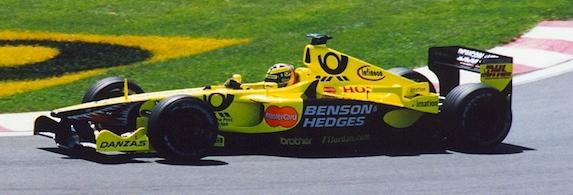
Heinz-Harald Frentzen drove for the Jordan team at the start of the season, but later moved to Prost.

Schumacher and Barrichello started 1–2 in Malaysia and maintained their positions at the first corner, but there was a massive rain shower on the second lap, during which both Ferraris went off the track. After everyone pitted to change tyres, they were down in 10th and 11th, but they changed to intermediate tyres, while all others had changed to full wets. This masterstroke meant that the Ferraris were able to charge back up the order and get back first and second. Schumacher won, with Barrichello completing a Ferrari 1–2, and Coulthard was third.

Schumacher was on pole in Brazil, but a collision on the first lap brought out the safety car. When the race restarted, Williams rookie Juan Pablo Montoya shocked Schumacher by coming up the inside of him and taking the lead. Montoya was well set for a stunning maiden win until he got hit from behind by Jos Verstappen while lapping him. It began to rain and after everyone changed the tyres, Schumacher was leading, but then Coulthard passed him on the first turn when they were lapping Tarso Marques in a move reminiscent of the one made by Mika Häkkinen on Schumacher in Belgium last year. Coulthard went on to win, with Schumacher and Nick Heidfeld second and third.

In Ferrari's first 'home' race in San Marino, their main rivals McLaren stunned them by qualifying 1–2, with Coulthard on pole. Schumacher was fourth behind his brother Ralf. Ralf shot to the lead at the start, passing both McLarens before the first corner, and was never headed. Coulthard finished second, with Barrichello jumping Häkkinen in the stops to take third. Michael Schumacher had a miserable afternoon, suffering a gearbox glitch early on and then having to retire after a puncture that damaged the wheel rim and a brake duct.

After four races, Schumacher and Coulthard were level on the standings with 26 points, Barrichello and Ralf were third with 14 and 12 points respectively. Häkkinen had only 4 and was only seventh in the standings. In the Constructors' Championship, Ferrari led with 40, with McLaren second with 30. Williams was third with 12.

=== Rounds 5 to 8 ===
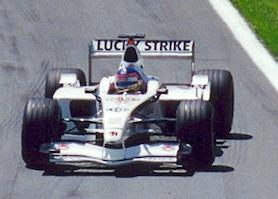
Jacques Villeneuve gave the BAR team their first-ever podium finish at the Spanish Grand Prix.

The next round in Spain was the first after the reintroduction of traction control, launch control, and fully-automatic transmissions. The driving aids were brought back to ensure no teams were cheating, but questions were raised over the reliability. Their first victim was David Coulthard, who stalled on the grid and had to start from the back. The race saw a battle between Schumacher and Häkkinen, with the former winning pole and leading the opening two thirds of the race. During the second pit stop, however, Schumacher had a problem and lost the lead to Häkkinen, who then stretched his lead to half a minute, as Schumacher was struggling with a suspension problem. Ironically and shockingly, it was Häkkinen's car that gave out on the last lap with a clutch failure, giving the win to Schumacher. Juan Pablo Montoya finished second and Jacques Villeneuve completed the podium. Coulthard recovered to fifth.

The sixth round took place in Austria, where the two Williams cars out-dragged polesitter Michael Schumacher into the first corner. His brother Ralf soon retired with a brake problem, leaving his teammate vulnerable to the Ferrari's attack. Schumacher tried to pass Montoya, but instead, both went into the gravel and rejoined sixth and seventh. Coulthard took the lead by jumping Rubens Barrichello in the second round of stops, and held on to take the win. Barrichello had to yield second to a recovering Schumacher on the final lap.

Coulthard took pole at the Monaco GP but stalled on the grid after, again, suffering problems with the launch control system. This released the two Ferraris and Häkkinen to battle for the win. When Häkkinen's engine failed early on, the Ferraris cruised to a 1–2 finish, with Schumacher winning ahead of Barrichello. The demise of the McLarens allowed Eddie Irvine to get a podium, while Coulthard recovered to fifth, despite spending the majority of the race stuck behind Enrique Bernoldi.

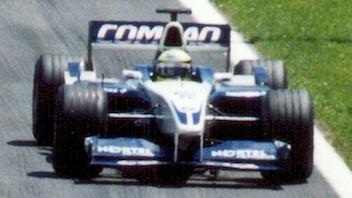
Ralf Schumacher won the Canadian Grand Prix, after a closely fought battle with his brother Michael.

The race in Canada was a battle between the Schumacher brothers, with Michael taking pole and maintaining his lead at the first corner. Ralf, however, kept up with him, and when his brother pitted, upped the pace with a string of quick laps, and came out five seconds ahead. Ralf cruised to victory, with his brother making it the first time ever that brothers had finished 1–2 in a race. Häkkinen finished third, scoring his first podium of the season. Coulthard was set for third but retired when his engine failed 15 laps from the finish.

With nearly half the season complete, Schumacher had 58 points and led Coulthard by 18 points. Coulthard had a further 16 points over Barrichello who had 24 points, and 18 over Ralf, who had 22. Häkkinen was fifth in the standings with 8 points. In the Constructors' Championship, Ferrari with 82 points had a huge lead over McLaren, who had 48. Williams was third with 28.

=== Rounds 9 to 12 ===
The European Grand Prix was next and the Schumacher brothers were in the spotlights again. Michael took his seventh pole position of the season, ahead of his brother. They maintained their positions at the start and Ralf was able to keep up in second during the first stint. However, he passed the white line after his first pit stop and received a stop-go penalty, which dropped him out of contention. This left Michael Schumacher to cruise to another victory, with Juan Pablo Montoya in second and David Coulthard in third. Ralf, even with his penalty, was able to get fourth ahead of Rubens Barrichello and Mika Häkkinen.

In France, the Schumacher brothers started 1–2 again, but it was Ralf who took his first-ever career pole. Ralf maintained his lead at the start, but his brother jumped him at the first round of stops and then pulled away. Coulthard, who had started third, was in contention until he went over the white line while coming out of the pit lane and received a stop-go penalty. Montoya was running quickly and could have challenged his teammate for a second, had his engine not blown up. Schumacher won comfortably from Ralf, with Barrichello holding off Coulthard for third.

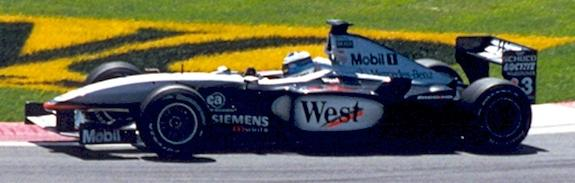
Mika Häkkinen completed his final season in Formula One by taking two victories, in Britain and in the United States.

Michael Schumacher took pole for the British GP and maintained his position at the first corner. But on the fifth lap, Häkkinen, who was on a two-stopper, passed him and never looked back to take a dominant first win of the year. Schumacher was over half a minute back in second and Barrichello completed the podium.

The weekend of the German GP was dominated by the Williams team and their drivers locked out the front row. This time, it was Montoya in first place, taking his first career pole. He kept the lead at the start and was looking well set to win until his engine blew up. This left Ralf Schumacher to cruise to victory. Barrichello took second and Jacques Villeneuve third, both of them capitalising on Michael Schumacher's retirement with a fuel pressure problem and the fact that both McLarens retired with engine failure.

Schumacher now had no less than 84 points and it seemed inevitable that he would win the championship. A win in the next round in Hungary would be enough. Coulthard was a distant second with 47 and was looking anxiously over his shoulders, as Ralf with 41 and Barrichello with 37 were hot on his heels. Häkkinen and Montoya were fifth and sixth with 19 and 15 points respectively. In the Constructors' Championship, Ferrari led with 121 compared to McLaren's 66, and a 1–2 in Hungary would wrap up the title. Williams were third with 56, within touching distance of McLaren.

=== Rounds 13 to 17 ===
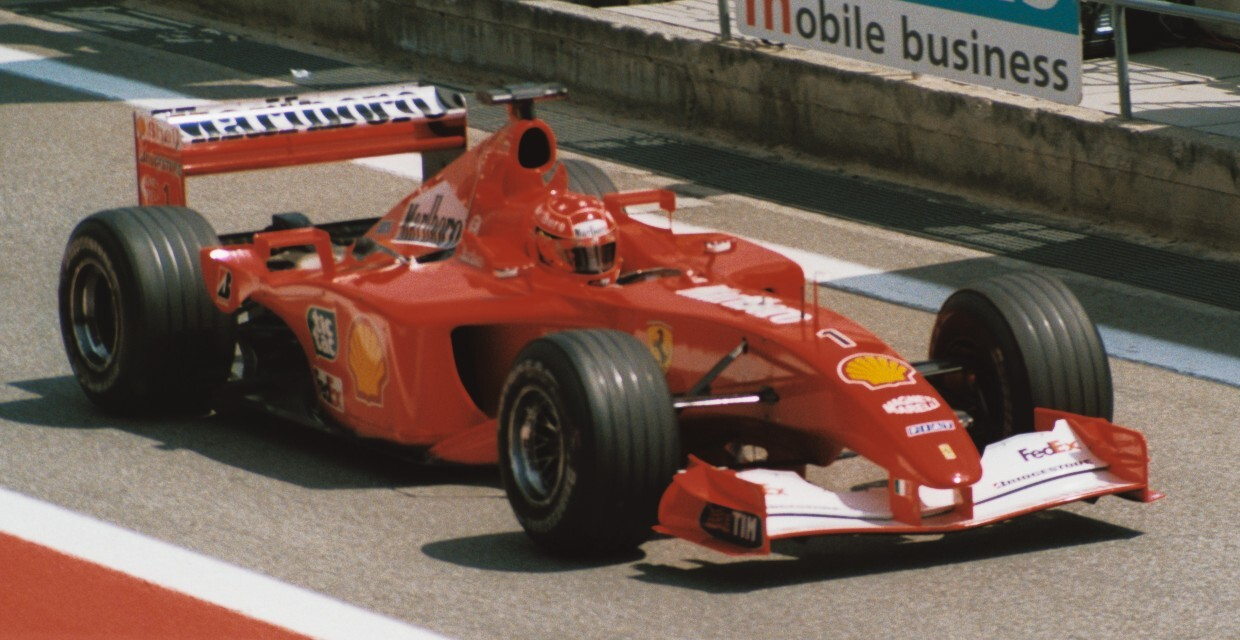
Michael Schumacher clinched his fourth World Championship with a victory at the Hungarian Grand Prix.

After the summer break, Michael Schumacher took another step to winning the title by taking pole position at the Hungarian GP, ahead of David Coulthard and Rubens Barrichello. He kept the lead at the start, but Coulthard was passed by Barrichello. Coulthard then jumped Barrichello at the first round of pit stops, only for the Brazilian to return the favour at the second round. Schumacher won the race and clinched the Drivers' Championship. Barrichello came home in second, to make it a Ferrari 1–2 and secure the Constructors' Championship. A disappointed Coulthard finished third.

The two Williams cars of Juan Pablo Montoya and Ralf Schumacher qualified 1–2 for the Belgian GP, but Montoya stalled on the grid and started at the back and Ralf was passed by his brother and world champion Michael into the first corner. After a few laps, there was a collision between Eddie Irvine and Luciano Burti. Burti careered head-on into the tyre barrier and had to be treated for his injuries. While the injuries were not serious, Burti was never to race in F1 again. The race was suspended and shortened to 36 laps. At the restart, the top 3 were Michael Schumacher, his brother Ralf and Barrichello. However, Ralf's car was still on its jacks when the warm-up lap started and he had to start at the back. Michael kept the lead at the start and pulled away, while Barrichello lost out to Giancarlo Fisichella. Barrichello lost further time when he ran over a bollard at the Bus Stop chicane and damaging his front wing, and he had to go around for an entire lap before he could pit and change the wing. This left the two McLarens pressuring Fisichella for second. David Coulthard was able to pass the Benetton with 10 laps left. Schumacher took his 52nd career win, breaking Alain Prost's record of most wins ever, with Coulthard and Fisichella completing the podium.

The next round was in Italy. It was the first race after the September 11 attacks. Because of this, and also thinking of the horrific accident of Alessandro Zanardi in the Champ Car World Series the day before, Michael Schumacher asked all the drivers to go slowly at the first corner. This plan failed when Jacques Villeneuve and Benetton boss Flavio Briatore did not accept it. The Ferrari did adjust their livery: they ran without sponsors' logos, in deference to sponsor Philip Morris USA, and with a black tip on their nose, out of respect for the 9/11 victims. Montoya took pole, ahead of the two Ferraris of Barrichello and Schumacher. The top 3 maintained their positions at the start, but Montoya was soon passed by a two-stopping Barrichello. After utilising different strategies and Barrichello suffering a 7-second delay in his first stop, a jubilant Montoya came out on top to take his first career win. Barrichello and Ralf Schumacher finished second and third.

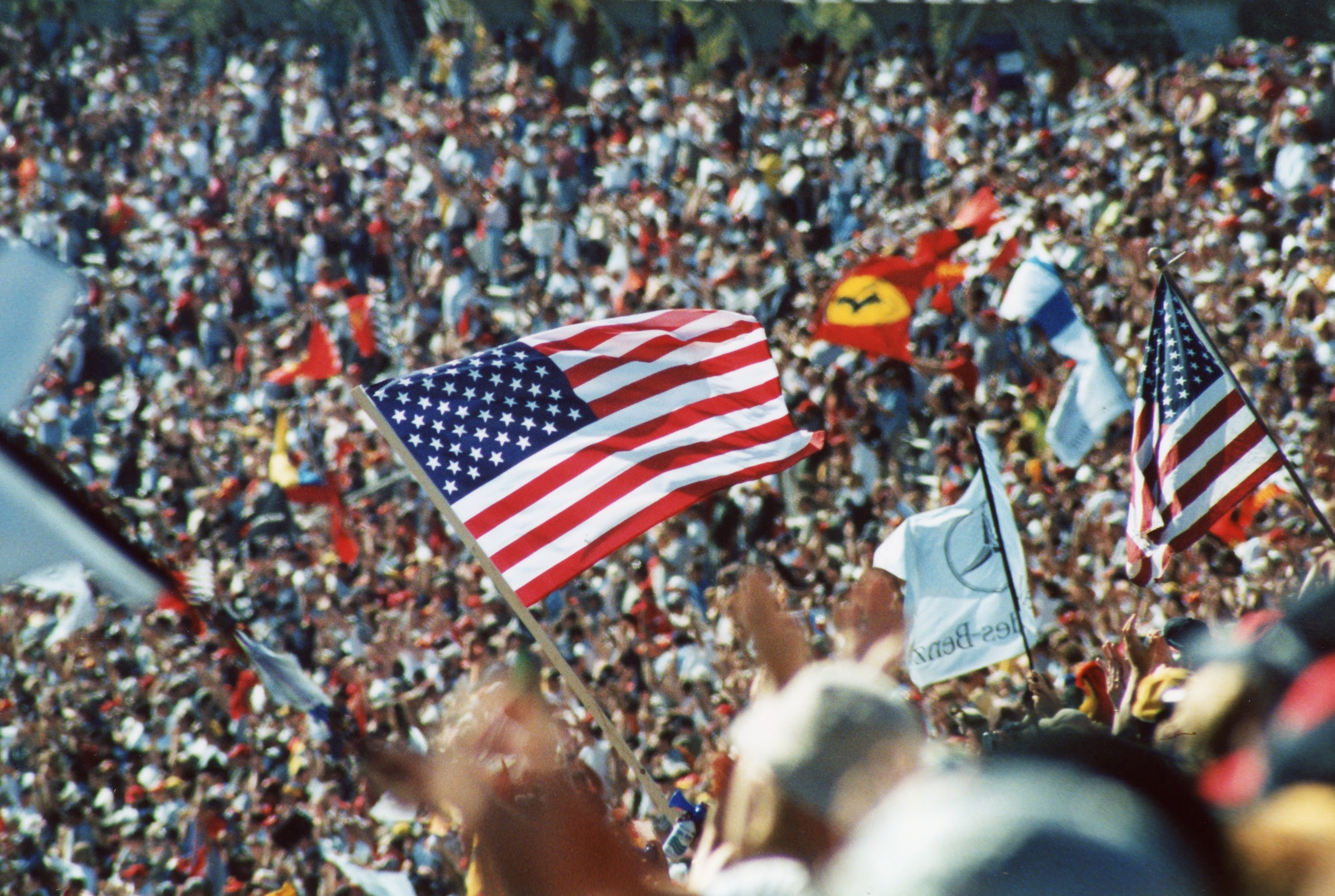
The United States Grand Prix was the first international sporting event held in the US after 9/11.

The US GP was host to the penultimate round and Schumacher took pole ahead of his brother and Montoya. Schumacher led into the first corner, while Ralf lost out to both Montoya and Barrichello. A two-stopping Barrichello soon took the lead and subsequently pitted. Montoya passed Michael Schumacher before the round of stops, but two laps after his stop, he retired with engine failure. At the half-way point, Barrichello was leading from Mika Häkkinen, Schumacher and Coulthard. He rejoined behind Häkkinen after his second stop, but started to close in, until his engine failed on the penultimate lap. Häkkinen took what would be his last win. Barrichello's demise left Schumacher and Coulthard to take second and third.

The last round took place in Japan and Michael Schumacher took pole again, ahead of Montoya and Ralf. The top 3 kept their places into the first corner, but Ralf was soon passed by a three-stopping Barrichello. The Brazilian was unable to pass Montoya, however, and this ruined his strategy. Ralf was given a stop-go penalty for cutting the chicane at the last corner too frequently. This left Häkkinen running third in his last race in F1, but he handed the position to teammate Coulthard, as a token of gratitude. Schumacher capped off the season with a victory ahead of Montoya and Coulthard.

At the end of the season, Schumacher was a dominant champion with 123 points. Coulthard with 65 was a distant second (58 points behind). Barrichello was third with 56, which meant that Michael had collected more points than the second and third-placed drivers put together. Ralf Schumacher was fourth with 49, Häkkinen fifth with 37, and Montoya sixth with 31. In the Constructors' Championship, Ferrari was the winner with 179 points, 77 ahead of second-placed McLaren with 102, and Williams was third with 80 points.

=== Post-season ===
During the season, double world champion Mika Häkkinen had announced his intention to take a one-year sabbatical in 2002. Eventually, it became clear that it would be his full-time retirement. Also racing for the last time in 2001 was Jean Alesi, who passed the mark of 200 Grands Prix shortly before his final race in Japan.

Veteran British sports commentator Murray Walker provided his final commentary at the United States Grand Prix, where Häkkinen took home what would be his last win.

Finally, the Prost team folded at the end of the year due to a lack of finances, while Benetton was re-branded as Renault after the French manufacturer bought the team outright.

== Calendar ==
The 2001 calendar featured the same seventeen Grands Prix as the previous season.

Round	Grand Prix	Circuit	Date
1	Australian Grand Prix	(Australia) Albert Park Circuit, Melbourne	4 March
2	Malaysian Grand Prix	(Malaysia) Sepang International Circuit, Kuala Lumpur	18 March
3	Brazilian Grand Prix	(Brazil) Autódromo José Carlos Pace, São Paulo	1 April
4	San Marino Grand Prix	(Italy) Autodromo Enzo e Dino Ferrari, Imola	15 April
5	Spanish Grand Prix	(Spain) Circuit de Catalunya, Montmeló	29 April
6	Austrian Grand Prix	(Austria) A1-Ring, Spielberg	13 May
7	Monaco Grand Prix	Circuit de Monaco, Monte Carlo	27 May
8	Canadian Grand Prix	(Canada) Circuit Gilles Villeneuve, Montreal	10 June
9	European Grand Prix	(Germany) Nürburgring, Nürburg	24 June
10	French Grand Prix	(France) Circuit de Nevers Magny-Cours, Magny-Cours	1 July
11	British Grand Prix	(United Kingdom) Silverstone Circuit, Silverstone	15 July
12	German Grand Prix	(Germany) Hockenheimring, Hockenheim	29 July
13	Hungarian Grand Prix	(Hungary) Hungaroring, Mogyoród	19 August
14	Belgian Grand Prix	(Belgium) Circuit de Spa-Francorchamps, Stavelot	2 September
15	Italian Grand Prix	(Italy) Autodromo Nazionale di Monza, Monza	16 September
16	United States Grand Prix	(United States) Indianapolis Motor Speedway, Speedway	30 September
17	Japanese Grand Prix	(Japan) Suzuka Circuit, Suzuka	14 October

== Results and standings ==
=== Grands Prix ===
Round	Grand Prix	Pole position	Fastest lap	Winning driver	Winning constructor	Report
1	(Australia) Australian Grand Prix	(Germany) Michael Schumacher	(Germany) Michael Schumacher	(Germany) Michael Schumacher	(Italy) Ferrari	Report
2	(Malaysia) Malaysian Grand Prix	(Germany) Michael Schumacher	(Finland) Mika Häkkinen	(Germany) Michael Schumacher	(Italy) Ferrari	Report
3	(Brazil) Brazilian Grand Prix	(Germany) Michael Schumacher	(Germany) Ralf Schumacher	(United Kingdom) David Coulthard	(United Kingdom) McLaren-Mercedes	Report
4	(Italy) San Marino Grand Prix	(United Kingdom) David Coulthard	(Germany) Ralf Schumacher	(Germany) Ralf Schumacher	(United Kingdom) Williams-BMW	Report
5	(Spain) Spanish Grand Prix	(Germany) Michael Schumacher	(Germany) Michael Schumacher	(Germany) Michael Schumacher	(Italy) Ferrari	Report
6	(Austria) Austrian Grand Prix	(Germany) Michael Schumacher	(United Kingdom) David Coulthard	(United Kingdom) David Coulthard	(United Kingdom) McLaren-Mercedes	Report
7	Monaco Grand Prix	(United Kingdom) David Coulthard (Note: David Coulthard set the fastest qualifying time, but started the race from the back of the grid after stalling on the formation lap. Pole position was left vacant on the grid. Michael Schumacher, in the second slot, was the first driver on the grid, but Coulthard is still considered to have held pole position.)	(United Kingdom) David Coulthard	(Germany) Michael Schumacher	(Italy) Ferrari	Report
8	(Canada) Canadian Grand Prix	(Germany) Michael Schumacher	(Germany) Ralf Schumacher	(Germany) Ralf Schumacher	(United Kingdom) Williams-BMW	Report
9	(Germany) European Grand Prix	(Germany) Michael Schumacher	(Colombia) Juan Pablo Montoya	(Germany) Michael Schumacher	(Italy) Ferrari	Report
10	(France) French Grand Prix	(Germany) Ralf Schumacher	(United Kingdom) David Coulthard	(Germany) Michael Schumacher	(Italy) Ferrari	Report
11	(United Kingdom) British Grand Prix	(Germany) Michael Schumacher	(Finland) Mika Häkkinen	(Finland) Mika Häkkinen	(United Kingdom) McLaren-Mercedes	Report
12	(Germany) German Grand Prix	(Colombia) Juan Pablo Montoya	(Colombia) Juan Pablo Montoya	(Germany) Ralf Schumacher	(United Kingdom) Williams-BMW	Report
13	(Hungary) Hungarian Grand Prix	(Germany) Michael Schumacher	(Finland) Mika Häkkinen	(Germany) Michael Schumacher	(Italy) Ferrari	Report
14	(Belgium) Belgian Grand Prix	(Colombia) Juan Pablo Montoya (Note: Juan Pablo Montoya set the fastest qualifying time, but started the race from the back of the grid after stalling on the second formation lap. Pole position was left vacant on the grid. Ralf Schumacher, in the second slot, was the first driver on the grid, but Montoya is still considered to have held pole position.)	(Germany) Michael Schumacher	(Germany) Michael Schumacher	(Italy) Ferrari	Report
15	(Italy) Italian Grand Prix	(Colombia) Juan Pablo Montoya	(Germany) Ralf Schumacher	(Colombia) Juan Pablo Montoya	(United Kingdom) Williams-BMW	Report
16	United States Grand Prix	(Germany) Michael Schumacher	(Colombia) Juan Pablo Montoya	(Finland) Mika Häkkinen	(United Kingdom) McLaren-Mercedes	Report
17	(Japan) Japanese Grand Prix	(Germany) Michael Schumacher	(Germany) Ralf Schumacher (Note: Juan Pablo Montoya originally set the fastest lap, but his time was discredited due to him cutting the chicane. Ralf Schumacher, initially having the second-fastest lap, was recognised for setting the fastest lap of the race.)	(Germany) Michael Schumacher	(Italy) Ferrari	Report

=== Scoring system ===
Points were awarded to the top six finishers in each race as follows:

Position	1st	2nd	3rd	4th	5th	6th
Points	10	6	4	3	2	1

=== World Drivers' Championship standings ===
Pos.	Driver	AUS (Australia)	MAL (Malaysia)	BRA (Brazil)	SMR (Italy)	ESP (Spain)	AUT (Austria)	MON (Monaco)	CAN (Canada)	EUR (Germany)	FRA (France)	GBR (United Kingdom)	GER (Germany)	HUN (Hungary)	BEL (Belgium)	ITA (Italy)	USA (United States)	JPN (Japan)	Points
1	(Germany) Michael Schumacher	1^{P}^{F}	1^{P}	2^{P}	Ret	1^{P}^{F}	2^{P}	1	2^{P}	1^{P}	1	2^{P}	Ret	1^{P}	1^{F}	4	2^{P}	1^{P}	123
2	(United Kingdom) David Coulthard	2	3	1	2^{P}	5	1^{F}	5^{P}^{F}	Ret	3	4^{F}	Ret	Ret	3	2	Ret	3	3	65
3	(Brazil) Rubens Barrichello	3	2	Ret	3	Ret	3	2	Ret	5	3	3	2	2	5	2	15^{†}	5	56
4	(Germany) Ralf Schumacher	Ret	5	Ret^{F}	1^{F}	Ret	Ret	Ret	1^{F}	4	2^{P}	Ret	1	4	7	3^{F}	Ret	6^{F}	49
5	(Finland) Mika Häkkinen	Ret	6^{F}	Ret	4	9^{†}	Ret	Ret	3	6	DNS	1^{F}	Ret	5^{F}	4	Ret	1	4	37
6	(Colombia) Juan Pablo Montoya	Ret	Ret	Ret	Ret	2	Ret	Ret	Ret	2^{F}	Ret	4	Ret^{P}^{F}	8	Ret^{P}	1^{P}	Ret^{F}	2	31
7	(Canada) Jacques Villeneuve	Ret	Ret	7	Ret	3	8	4	Ret	9	Ret	8	3	9	8	6	Ret	10	12
8	(Germany) Nick Heidfeld	4	Ret	3	7	6	9	Ret	Ret	Ret	6	6	Ret	6	Ret	11	6	9	12
9	(Italy) Jarno Trulli	Ret	8	5	5	4	DSQ	Ret	11^{†}	Ret	5	Ret	Ret	Ret	Ret	Ret	4	8	12
10	(Finland) Kimi Räikkönen	6	Ret	Ret	Ret	8	4	10	4	10	7	5	Ret	7	DNS	7	Ret	Ret	9
11	(Italy) Giancarlo Fisichella	13	Ret	6	Ret	14	Ret	Ret	Ret	11	11	13	4	Ret	3	10	8	17^{†}	8
12	(United Kingdom) Eddie Irvine	11	Ret	Ret	Ret	Ret	7	3	Ret	7	Ret	9	Ret	Ret	DNS	Ret	5	Ret	6
13	(Germany) Heinz-Harald Frentzen	5	4	11^{†}	6	Ret	Ret	Ret	WD	Ret	8	7		Ret	9	Ret	10	12	6
14	(France) Olivier Panis	7	Ret	4	8	7	5	Ret	Ret	Ret	9	Ret	7	Ret	11	9	11	13	5
15	(France) Jean Alesi	9	9	8	9	10	10	6	5	15^{†}	12	11	6	10	6	8	7	Ret	5
16	(Spain) Pedro de la Rosa					Ret	Ret	Ret	6	8	14	12	Ret	11	Ret	5	12	Ret	3
17	(United Kingdom) Jenson Button	14^{†}	11	10	12	15	Ret	7	Ret	13	16^{†}	15	5	Ret	Ret	Ret	9	7	2
18	(Netherlands) Jos Verstappen	10	7	Ret	Ret	12	6	8	10^{†}	Ret	13	10	9	12	10	Ret	Ret	15	1
19	(Brazil) Ricardo Zonta								7				Ret						0
20	(Brazil) Luciano Burti	8	10	Ret	11	11	11	Ret	8	12	10	Ret	Ret	Ret	DNS				0
21	(Brazil) Enrique Bernoldi	Ret	Ret	Ret	10	Ret	Ret	9	Ret	Ret	Ret	14	8	Ret	12	Ret	13	14	0
22	(Brazil) Tarso Marques	Ret	14	9	Ret	16	Ret	Ret	9	Ret	15	DNQ	Ret	Ret	13				0
23	(Spain) Fernando Alonso	12	13	Ret	Ret	13	Ret	Ret	Ret	14	17^{†}	16	10	Ret	DNS	13	Ret	11	0
24	(Czech Republic) Tomáš Enge															12	14	Ret	0
25	(Argentina) Gastón Mazzacane	Ret	12	Ret	Ret														0
26	(Malaysia) Alex Yoong															Ret	Ret	16	0
Pos.	Driver	AUS (Australia)	MAL (Malaysia)	BRA (Brazil)	SMR (Italy)	ESP (Spain)	AUT (Austria)	MON (Monaco)	CAN (Canada)	EUR (Germany)	FRA (France)	GBR (United Kingdom)	GER (Germany)	HUN (Hungary)	BEL (Belgium)	ITA (Italy)	USA (United States)	JPN (Japan)	Points

Key
Colour	Result
Gold	Winner
Silver	Second place
Bronze	Third place
Green	Other points position
Blue	Other classified position
Blue	Not classified, finished (NC)
Purple	Not classified, retired (Ret)
Red	Did not qualify (DNQ)
Black	Disqualified (DSQ)
White	Did not start (DNS)
White	Race cancelled (C)
Blank	Did not practice (DNP)
Blank	Excluded (EX)
Blank	Did not arrive (DNA)
Blank	Withdrawn (WD)
Blank	Did not enter (empty cell)
Annotation	Meaning
P	Pole position
F	Fastest lap

Notes:

- † – Driver did not finish the Grand Prix but was classified, as he completed more than 90% of the race distance.

=== World Constructors' Championship standings ===
The 2001 calendar features the same seventeen Grands Prix as the previous season.

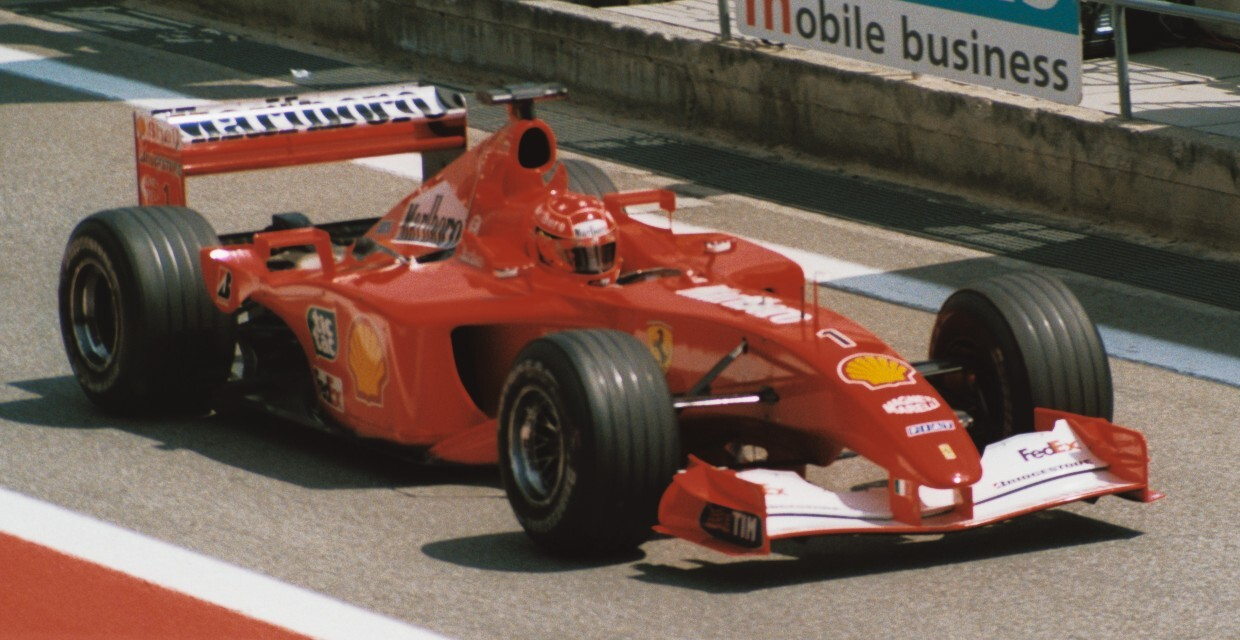
Ferrari won the 2001 Formula One World Championship for Constructors.

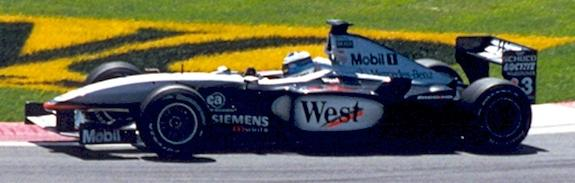
McLaren finished second with the MP4-16.

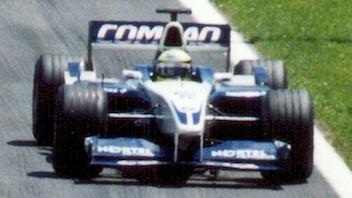
Williams finished third with the FW23.

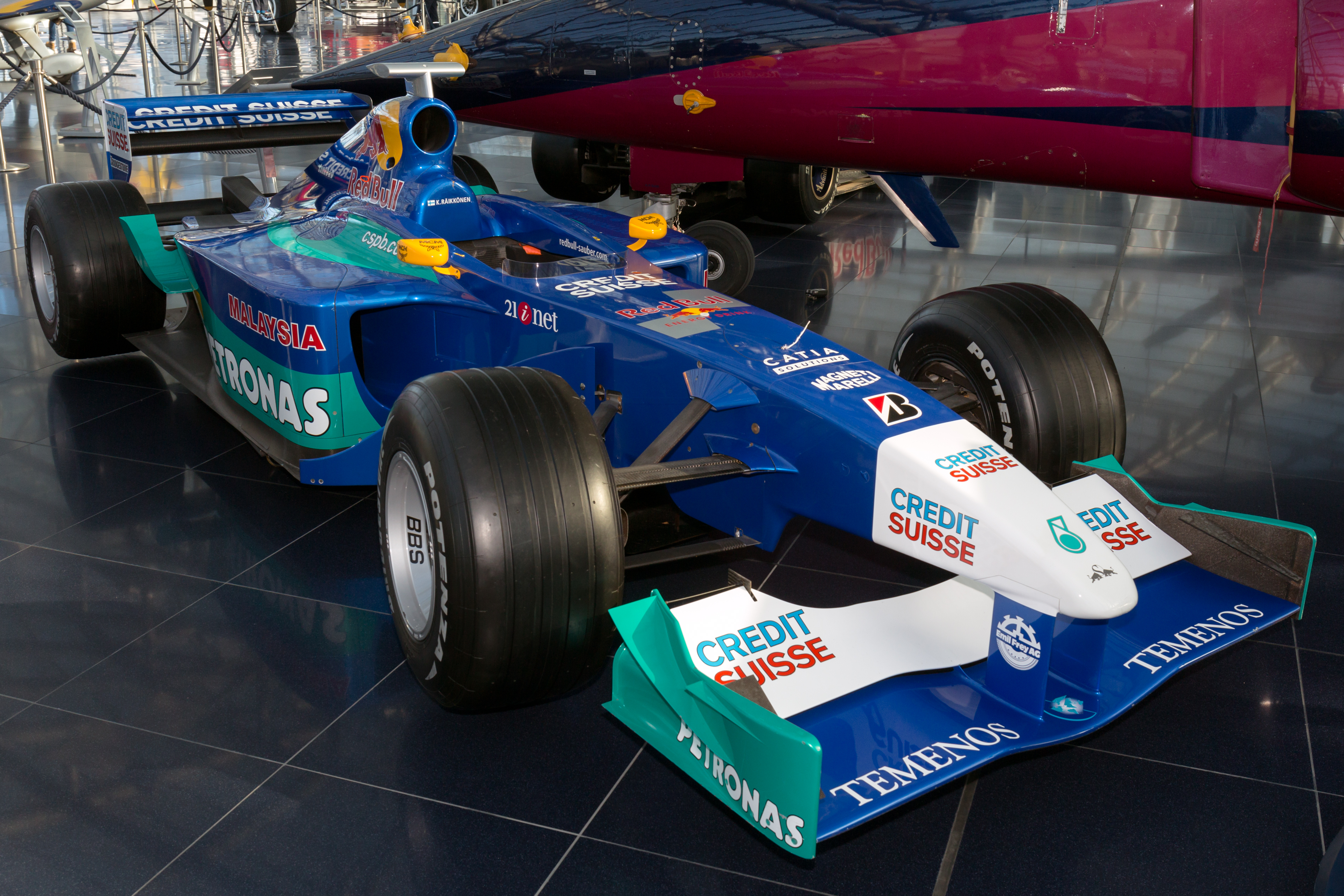
Sauber finished fourth with the C20.

Pos.	Constructor	No.	AUS (Australia)	MAL (Malaysia)	BRA (Brazil)	SMR (Italy)	ESP (Spain)	AUT (Austria)	MON (Monaco)	CAN (Canada)	EUR (Germany)	FRA (France)	GBR (United Kingdom)	GER (Germany)	HUN (Hungary)	BEL (Belgium)	ITA (Italy)	USA (United States)	JPN (Japan)	Points
1	(Italy) Ferrari	1	1^{P}^{F}	1^{P}	2^{P}	Ret	1^{P}^{F}	2^{P}	1	2^{P}	1^{P}	1	2^{P}	Ret	1^{P}	1^{F}	4	2^{P}	1^{P}	179
1	(Italy) Ferrari	2	3	2	Ret	3	Ret	3	2	Ret	5	3	3	2	2	5	2	15^{†}	5	179
2	(United Kingdom) McLaren-Mercedes	3	Ret	6^{F}	Ret	4	9^{†}	Ret	Ret	3	6	DNS	1^{F}	Ret	5^{F}	4	Ret	1	4	102
2	(United Kingdom) McLaren-Mercedes	4	2	3	1	2^{P}	5	1^{F}	5^{P}^{F}	Ret	3	4^{F}	Ret	Ret	3	2	Ret	3	3	102
3	(United Kingdom) Williams-BMW	5	Ret	5	Ret^{F}	1^{F}	Ret	Ret	Ret	1^{F}	4	2^{P}	Ret	1	4	7	3^{F}	Ret	6^{F}	80
3	(United Kingdom) Williams-BMW	6	Ret	Ret	Ret	Ret	2	Ret	Ret	Ret	2^{F}	Ret	4	Ret^{P}^{F}	8	Ret^{P}	1^{P}	Ret^{F}	2	80
4	(Switzerland) Sauber-Petronas	16	4	Ret	3	7	6	9	Ret	Ret	Ret	6	6	Ret	6	Ret	11	6	9	21
4	(Switzerland) Sauber-Petronas	17	6	Ret	Ret	Ret	8	4	10	4	10	7	5	Ret	7	DNS	7	Ret	Ret	21
5	(Republic of Ireland) Jordan-Honda	11	5	4	11^{†}	6	Ret	Ret	Ret	7	Ret	8	7	Ret	Ret	Ret	Ret	4	8	19
5	(Republic of Ireland) Jordan-Honda	12	Ret	8	5	5	4	DSQ	Ret	11^{†}	Ret	5	Ret	Ret	10	6	8	7	Ret	19
6	(United Kingdom) BAR-Honda	9	7	Ret	4	8	7	5	Ret	Ret	Ret	9	Ret	7	Ret	11	9	11	13	17
6	(United Kingdom) BAR-Honda	10	Ret	Ret	7	Ret	3	8	4	Ret	9	Ret	8	3	9	8	6	Ret	10	17
7	(Italy) Benetton-Renault	7	13	Ret	6	Ret	14	Ret	Ret	Ret	11	11	13	4	Ret	3	10	8	17^{†}	10
7	(Italy) Benetton-Renault	8	14^{†}	11	10	12	15	Ret	7	Ret	13	16^{†}	15	5	Ret	Ret	Ret	9	7	10
8	(United Kingdom) Jaguar-Cosworth	18	11	Ret	Ret	Ret	Ret	7	3	Ret	7	Ret	9	Ret	Ret	DNS	Ret	5	Ret	9
8	(United Kingdom) Jaguar-Cosworth	19	8	10	Ret	11	Ret	Ret	Ret	6	8	14	12	Ret	11	Ret	5	12	Ret	9
9	(France) Prost-Acer	22	9	9	8	9	10	10	6	5	15^{†}	12	11	6	Ret	9	Ret	10	12	4
9	(France) Prost-Acer	23	Ret	12	Ret	Ret	11	11	Ret	8	12	10	Ret	Ret	Ret	DNS	12	14	Ret	4
10	(United Kingdom) Arrows-Asiatech	14	10	7	Ret	Ret	12	6	8	10^{†}	Ret	13	10	9	12	10	Ret	Ret	15	1
10	(United Kingdom) Arrows-Asiatech	15	Ret	Ret	Ret	10	Ret	Ret	9	Ret	Ret	Ret	14	8	Ret	12	Ret	13	14	1
11	(Italy) Minardi-European	20	Ret	14	9	Ret	16	Ret	Ret	9	Ret	15	DNQ	Ret	Ret	13	Ret	Ret	16	0
11	(Italy) Minardi-European	21	12	13	Ret	Ret	13	Ret	Ret	Ret	14	17^{†}	16	10	Ret	DNS	13	Ret	11	0
Pos.	Constructor	No.	AUS (Australia)	MAL (Malaysia)	BRA (Brazil)	SMR (Italy)	ESP (Spain)	AUT (Austria)	MON (Monaco)	CAN (Canada)	EUR (Germany)	FRA (France)	GBR (United Kingdom)	GER (Germany)	HUN (Hungary)	BEL (Belgium)	ITA (Italy)	USA (United States)	JPN (Japan)	Points

Notes:

- † – Driver did not finish the Grand Prix but was classified, as he completed more than 90% of the race distance.
