= 2002 Austrian Grand Prix =

Formula One motor race held in 2002

Coordinates: 47°13′11″N 14°45′53″E

Race 6 of 17 in the 2002 Formula One World Championship
← Previous race	Next race →

Race details
- Date: 12 May 2002
- Official name: Grosser A1 Preis von Österreich 2002
- Location: A1-Ring, Spielberg, Styria, Austria
- Course: Permanent racing facility
- Course length: 4.326 km (2.684 miles)
- Distance: 71 laps, 307.146 km (190.564 miles)
- Weather: Clear, air temperature: 20°C
- Attendance: 81,000

Pole position
Driver	(Brazil) Rubens Barrichello	Ferrari
- Time: 1:08.082

Fastest lap
Driver	(Germany) Michael Schumacher	Ferrari
- Time: 1:09.298 on lap 68

Podium
First	(Germany) Michael Schumacher	Ferrari
Second	(Brazil) Rubens Barrichello	Ferrari
Third	(Colombia) Juan Pablo Montoya	Williams-BMW

The 2002 Austrian Grand Prix (formally the Grosser A1 Preis von Österreich 2002) was a Formula One motor race held on 12 May 2002 at the A1-Ring in Spielberg, Styria, Austria. It was the sixth round of the 2002 Formula One World Championship and the 25th Austrian Grand Prix as part of the Formula One World Championship. Ferrari driver Michael Schumacher won the 71-lap race starting from third position. His teammate Rubens Barrichello finished second, and Juan Pablo Montoya took third for the Williams team.

Michael Schumacher, who was the winner of four of the five preceding races in the season, led the World Drivers' Championship prior to the Grand Prix with his team Ferrari leading the World Constructors' Championship. Barrichello started the race from the pole position after recording the fastest lap in qualifying; Williams driver Ralf Schumacher started second, but was passed by Michael Schumacher in the first corner. Barrichello maintained the lead through most of the race until Ferrari invoked team orders on him to allow Michael Schumacher to win the race on the final lap and improve his standing in the World Drivers' Championship. It was his fourth victory in a row in the 2002 season and the 58th of his career. The safety car was deployed twice during the race, which included a major accident on lap 28 involving Jordan driver Takuma Sato and Nick Heidfeld of the Sauber team, who both sustained light injuries.

At the post-race podium ceremony, Michael Schumacher implored Barrichello to mount the stand reserved for the race winner and gave the first-place trophy to his teammate. That led the Fédération Internationale de l'Automobile (FIA, Formula One's governing body) to fine Ferrari, Michael Schumacher and Barrichello $1 million on 26 June; each paid a third immediately, while the remainder was suspended. Following a review, the FIA banned the practice of team orders beginning with the 2003 season; they began again allowing the practice following the 2010 season.

The win increased Michael Schumacher's lead in the World Drivers' Championship to 27 championship points over Montoya in second place. Ralf Schumacher came fourth to maintain third place, and Barrichello moved past David Coulthard of the McLaren team to fourth. In the World Constructors' Championship, Ferrari further extended their advantage over Williams to 16 championship points. McLaren were another 36 championship points behind in third with eleven races remaining in the season.

== Background ==
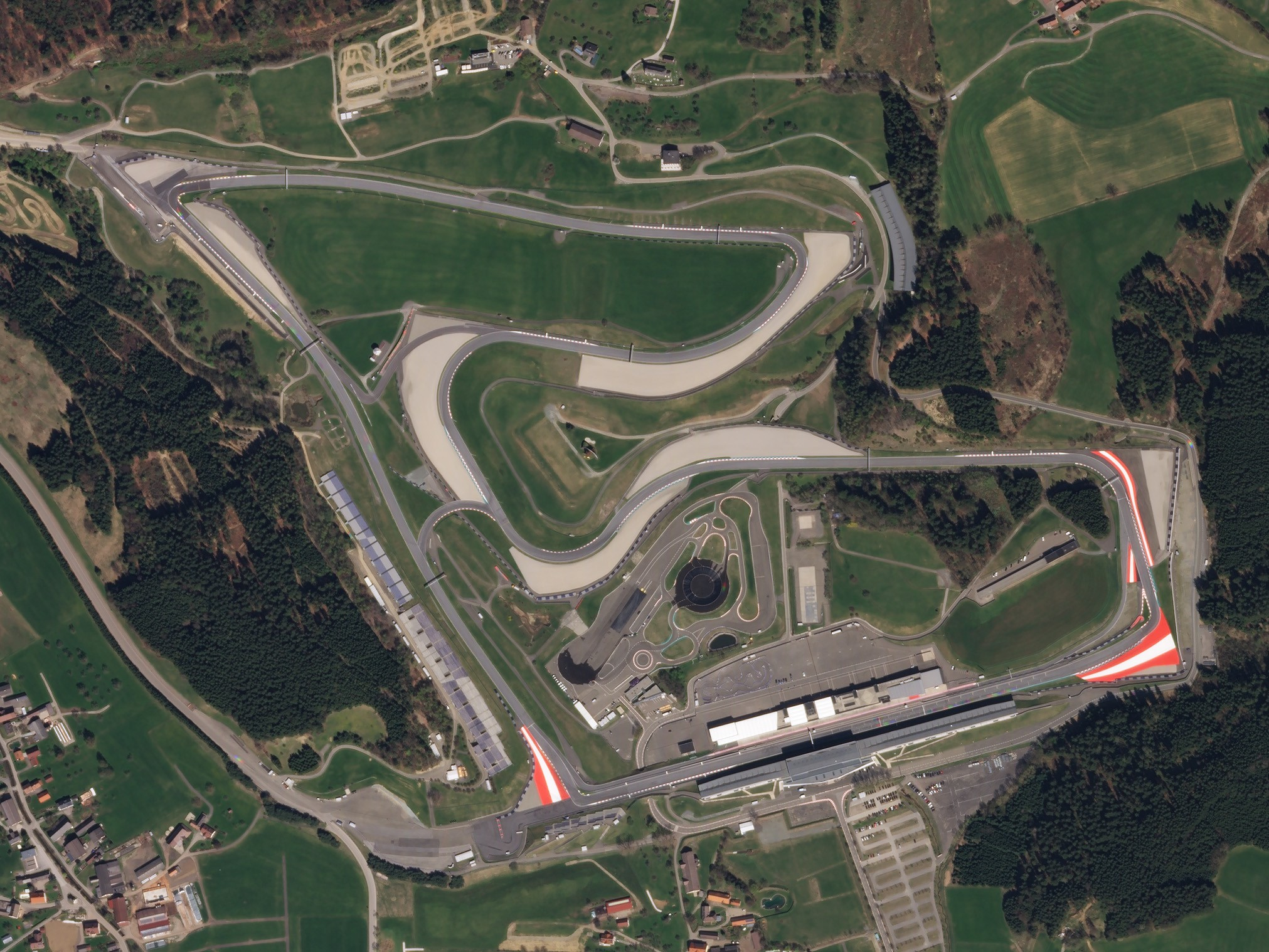
The A1 Ring, renamed in 2011 as the Red Bull Ring (pictured in 2018), is where the race was held.

The 2002 Austrian Grand Prix was the 6th of 17 motor races in the 2002 Formula One World Championship, and the 25th time it formed part of the championship. The 71-lap race was held at the 9-turn 4.326 km (2.688 mi) A1 Ring in Spielberg, Styria, on 12 May. With very few sections requiring drivers competitors to slow down, the track gives teams an opportunity to push their engines to their full potential. 70 percent of the lap can be driven at full racing speed, although the circuit's relatively high altitude of 700 m (2,300 ft) offers less oxygen to feed the combustion engines, reducing their performance by approximately seven percent.

Before the race, Ferrari driver Michael Schumacher led the Drivers' Championship with 44 championship points. Juan Pablo Montoya and Ralf Schumacher of the Williams team were second and third with 23 and 20 championship points, respectively. Driving for McLaren, David Coulthard was fourth with nine championship points, and Jenson Button for Renault was a further championship point behind in fifth. Ferrari led the Constructors' Championship with 50 championship points, seven ahead of Williams in second place. McLaren with 13 championship points were third, with Renault and Sauber tied for fourth with eight championship points apiece.

Michael Schumacher had won four of the opening five Grands Prix in 2002, with the only race he had not won being the Malaysian Grand Prix, where he finished third behind the two Williams drivers. He was strongly considered by the British press, bookmakers, and former drivers Gerhard Berger and Niki Lauda the favourite to win the Austrian Grand Prix, an event he had not won in four previous attempts. He said of his chances in Austria, "We believe we have a very competitive package overall but it's a question of how good the others can be." He expressed confidence he could challenge for victory saying, "I certainly won't be approaching this race any differently than the others. And with two almost perfect races behind us, I'm obviously looking forward to the Austrian Grand Prix with a lot of confidence." Montoya stated he would be better able to challenge Ferrari at the A1-Ring recalling the team's strong form in 2001 despite scoring no points, "I am pretty confident that in Austria we will be quite strong, certainly stronger than in [the prior race in] Barcelona, so I am looking forward to it."

For the Grand Prix, a total of 11 teams (each representing a different constructor) each entered two race drivers, with no changes from the season entry list. In technical developments, Sauber introduced a revised evolution of its Ferrari 050 engine that the team had used in the first five races of the 2002 championship. The team installed a new aerodynamic package that included a revised undertray, front wing and altered bodywork around the cover of the C21's engine. The Ferrari, McLaren and Williams teams brought new front brake air intakes. Williams also used an upgraded front wing on its FW24, which was characterised by a curved profile.

== Practice ==
There were four practice sessions preceding Sunday's race, two one-hour sessions on Friday and two 45-minute sessions on Saturday. The first practice session was held in cool and overcast weather. Michael Schumacher was fastest with a lap of 1:11.072 with approximately ten minutes remaining. His teammate Barrichello, Felipe Massa and Nick Heidfeld of Sauber, Jordan drivers Giancarlo Fisichella and Takuma Sato, Coulthard, Arrows' Heinz-Harald Frentzen, and the British American Racing (BAR) duo of Jacques Villeneuve and Olivier Panis, were second through tenth. Some drivers—including Barrichello, Massa and Fisichella—ran off the dusty, slippery track into a gravel trap during the session because of a low amount of grip; none sustained damage to their vehicles.

Conditions became warmer and sunnier for the second practice session though rainfall threatened towards the end. The fastest times were recorded within the first 20 minutes since the track temperature was at its warmest. Barrichello set the day's fastest lap, at 1:10.549. His teammate Michael Schumacher was three-hundredths of a second slower in second position. Montoya, Kimi Räikkönen of the McLaren team, Allan McNish for Toyota, Arrows driver Enrique Bernoldi, Jaguar's Pedro de la Rosa, Panis, Coulthard and Sato were third to tenth. Some drivers, including Michael and Ralf Schumacher, and McNish, again lost control of their cars and ran off to the side of the track during the session. Heidfeld's track time was curtailed after 20 minutes due to an alternator fault. Frentzen lost a quarter of an hour to familiarise himself with the track after he spun over a kerb and damaged his car's undertray.

The third practice session took place in clear and dry weather; no drivers ventured off the less slippery circuit. Michael Schumacher used low track and ambient temperatures to become the first driver to go below 70 seconds all weekend with a lap of 1:09.001 that he recorded half an hour in. His teammate Barrichello was second-fastest and Räikkönen third. Frentzen, Massa, Coulthard, Heidfeld, Panis, Button and Bernoldi followed in positions four through ten.

The ambient and track temperatures had increased by the start of the fourth practice session. Several competitors made driver errors sending them into the gravel. Michael Schumacher set the track lap record of 1:08.433. Barrichello was second, and Ralf Schumacher improved to third. Montoya, Frentzen, Massa, Heidfeld, Räikkönen, Panis and Villeneuve completed the top ten. Bernoldi missed 25 minutes due to a malfunctioning gearbox. He later lost control of the rear of his car at turn two and got beached in a gravel trap before the session ended.

== Qualifying ==
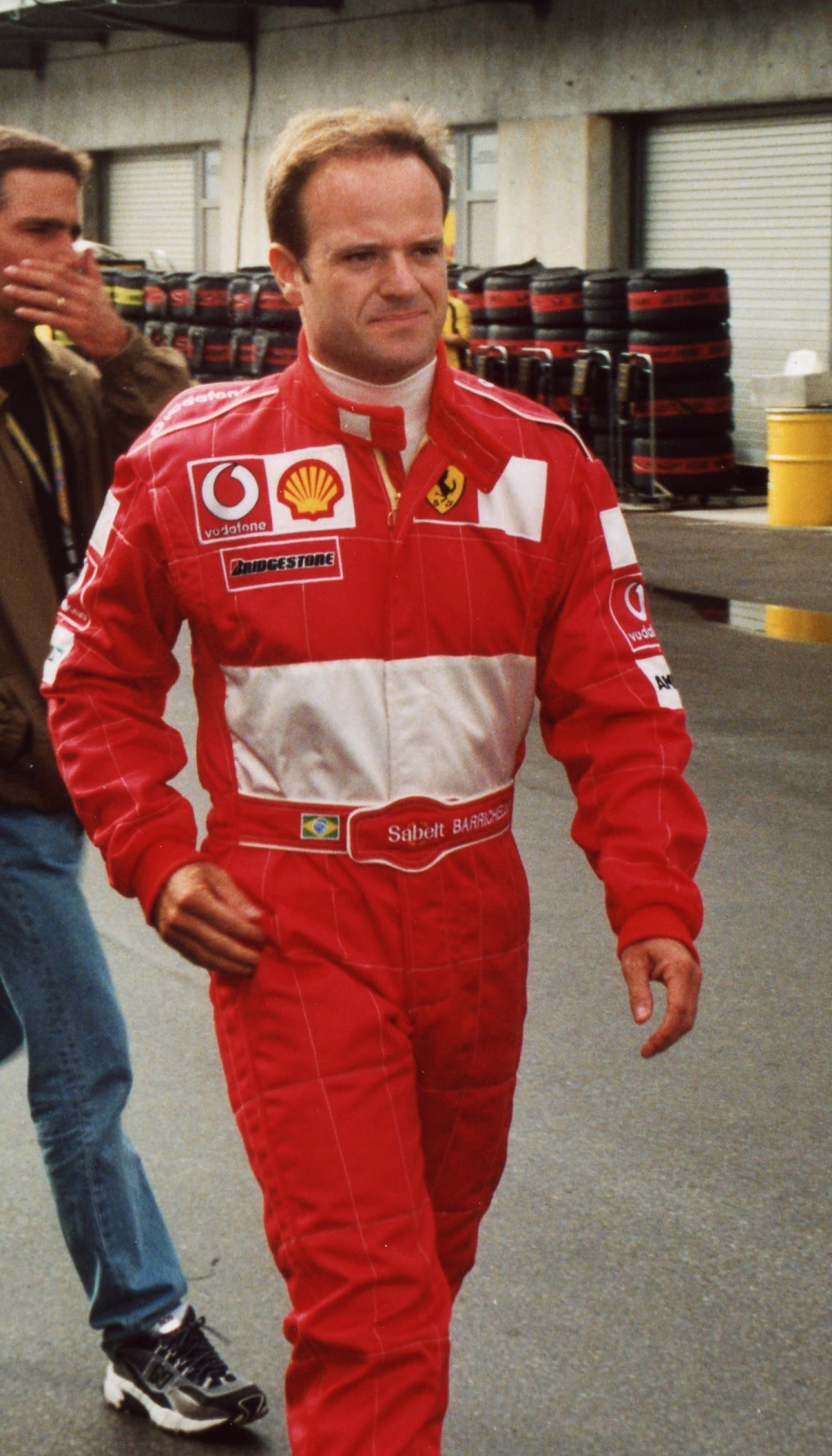
Rubens Barrichello took his second pole position of the 2002 season and the fifth of his career.

Saturday's afternoon one-hour qualifying session saw each competitor limited to twelve laps, with the starting order decided by their fastest laps. The 107% rule was in effect during this session, requiring each driver set a time within 107 per cent of the quickest lap to qualify for the race. Conditions were clear with warm air and track temperatures. Barrichello took his second pole position of the season and the fifth of his career with a lap of 1:08.082. He was joined on the grid's front row by Ralf Schumacher, who took his best starting position of the year and used the soft Michelin tyre compounds. Michael Schumacher was third; he said he lost speed due to a brake problem, and traffic slowed him. He switched to the spare Ferrari for his final timed lap in an unsuccessful attempt to claim pole position, and did not earn a front-row start for the first time since the 2001 Italian Grand Prix eight races earlier. A misfiring engine prompted Montoya in fourth to switch to the spare car setup for his teammate Ralf Schumacher; he made a minor tyre-pressure adjustment to record his fastest lap and hoped to use the harder Michelin compound better in the race. Heidfeld took fifth, claiming he could have improved had Button not slowed his final timed lap. A lack of speed restricted the McLaren duo of Räikkönen and Coulthard to sixth and eighth; they were separated by Massa who made two driver errors in an unbalanced car through high-speed turns. Panis was ninth-fastest as De la Rosa slowed his final timed lap. Toyota's Mika Salo in tenth had a minor understeer.

Frentzen in 11th spun on oil and removed some bodywork components from his car in a gravel trap. His vehicle was later repaired to continue driving. His Arrows' teammate Bernoldi followed in 12th and expressed satisfaction with his car's balance. Traffic slowed Button on his four timed laps and left him 13th. McNish and Toyota located a car setup tailored to suit him, and took 14th. Fisichella ran a new engine in qualifying and took 15th with a car setup suited for used front and new rear tyres. Jarno Trulli had a major engine failure through turn nine and lost control of his Renault on oil. The session was stopped for 11 minutes for track marshals to dry the oil. Trulli returned to the garage and used the spare Renault setup for his teammate Button and took 16th after minor braking problems. Villeneuve used a new set of tyres for qualifying; he was uncomfortable with his car's setup and was 17th. A handling imbalance created an unbalanced car for Sato in 18th. Jaguar's De la Rosa and Eddie Irvine filled the grid's tenth row: De la Rosa had a rear suspension fault caused by an exhaust overheating it and Irvine removed his front wing in a collision with the rear of Bernoldi's vehicle into turn one. Minardi drivers Mark Webber and Alex Yoong started from the eleventh row: Webber optimised his PS02's balance so it ran without any issues on its tyres during the session, and intermittent rear brake locking destabilised Yoong's car causing him to spin after leaving the pit lane.

=== Qualifying classification ===
Pos	No.	Driver	Constructor	Lap	Gap	Grid
1	2	(Brazil) Rubens Barrichello	Ferrari	1:08.082	—	1
2	5	(Germany) Ralf Schumacher	Williams-BMW	1:08.364	+0.282	2
3	1	(Germany) Michael Schumacher	Ferrari	1:08.704	+0.622	3
4	6	(Colombia) Juan Pablo Montoya	Williams-BMW	1:09.118	+1.036	4
5	7	(Germany) Nick Heidfeld	Sauber-Petronas	1:09.129	+1.047	5
6	4	(Finland) Kimi Räikkönen	McLaren-Mercedes	1:09.154	+1.072	6
7	8	(Brazil) Felipe Massa	Sauber-Petronas	1:09.228	+1.146	7
8	3	(United Kingdom) David Coulthard	McLaren-Mercedes	1:09.335	+1.253	8
9	12	(France) Olivier Panis	BAR-Honda	1:09.561	+1.479	9
10	24	(Finland) Mika Salo	Toyota	1:09.661	+1.579	10
11	20	(Germany) Heinz-Harald Frentzen	Arrows-Cosworth	1:09.671	+1.589	11
12	21	(Brazil) Enrique Bernoldi	Arrows-Cosworth	1:09.723	+1.641	12
13	15	(United Kingdom) Jenson Button	Renault	1:09.780	+1.698	13
14	25	(United Kingdom) Allan McNish	Toyota	1:09.818	+1.736	14
15	9	(Italy) Giancarlo Fisichella	Jordan-Honda	1:09.901	+1.819	15
16	14	(Italy) Jarno Trulli	Renault	1:09.980	+1.898	16
17	11	(Canada) Jacques Villeneuve	BAR-Honda	1:10.051	+1.969	17
18	10	(Japan) Takuma Sato	Jordan-Honda	1:10.058	+1.976	18
19	17	(Spain) Pedro de la Rosa	Jaguar-Cosworth	1:10.553	+2.471	19
20	16	(United Kingdom) Eddie Irvine	Jaguar-Cosworth	1:10.741	+2.659	20
21	23	(Australia) Mark Webber	Minardi-Asiatech	1:11.388	+3.306	21
22	22	(Malaysia) Alex Yoong	Minardi-Asiatech	1:12.336	+4.254	22
107% rule: 1:12.848

== Warm-up ==
A half-hour warm-up session took place on Sunday morning, in clear and warm weather. All drivers fine-tuned their race setups for the weather and drove their spare cars. Barrichello had the fastest lap of 1:10.876 and his teammate Michael Schumacher was second. Massa, Frentzen, Heidfeld, Bernoldi, Coulthard, Villeneuve, Räikkönen, and Irvine completed the top ten. While the session saw no major incidents, Ralf Schumacher entered the gravel traps at two of the track's corners.

After the warm-up session, Montoya predicted several drivers would run wide on a rumble strip located to the outside of the circuit, which extended from turn one to the first portion of the straight driving towards turn two, to increase the top speed of their cars. (Note: Fédération Internationale de l'Automobile race director Charlie Whiting told drivers in a meeting on Saturday afternoon they would be permitted to use the rumble strip to the outside of turn one.) Ron Dennis, the team principal of McLaren, argued Ferrari should allow their drivers to race each other without the imposition of team orders favouring one driver over the other as had happened at the 2001 Austrian Grand Prix.

== Race ==
The race began at 14:00 local time. It ran for 71 laps over a distance of 307.146 km (190.852 mi). The weather was clear and dry. The air temperature was 20 °C (68 °F) and the track temperature ranged from 27 to 29 °C (81 to 84 °F). Ferrari fulled their cars light for a two-stop strategy in a bid to ensure Michael Schumacher could pass Ralf Schumacher at the start. Barrichello made a brisk start to maintain the lead into the first turn. While he provided room for drivers to pass him, none did. Behind Barrichello, his teammate Michael Schumacher made a fast start to slot into second position and Heidfeld rose from fifth to third having overtaken Ralf Schumacher on the outside. Räikkönen and Massa, meanwhile, drew alongside and Massa steered onto the grass dropping to tenth. Further back, Bernoldi made contact with the rear of his teammate Frentzen; both cars continued as Bernoldi entered the pit lane after the first lap. At turn two, an increase in speed led De la Rosa's throttle pick-up to start to cut out. He slowed, and retired in the pit lane at the end of the lap. In the meantime, Villeneuve experienced a minor loss of car control and hit Frentzen's car on the inside. The collision sent Frentzen into a gravel trap from which he slowly extricated himself.

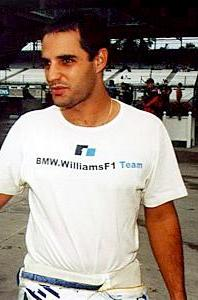
Juan Pablo Montoya (pictured at the 2002 United States Grand Prix) finished in third position

At the end of the first lap, Barrichello led Michael Schumacher, Heidfeld, Ralf Schumacher, Montoya, and Coulthard. Heidfeld ran wide at Castrol Kurve at the beginning of the second lap and the Williams pair of Ralf Schumacher and Montoya demoted him to fifth. Barrichello and Michael Schumacher began to pull away from the rest of the field, although neither driver ran flat-out during the race. There were overtakes further down the field. On lap two, Salo passed Button for eighth. Villeneuve overtook his teammate Panis for 14th position and Frentzen passed Webber on lap three. During the next, lap Yoong lost two places to his teammate Webber, and Frentzen. Bernoldi retired from the race with a broken front wing and front brake pipe. Räikkönen in seventh retired at the side of the track with an engine failure on lap six. On lap seven Villeneuve passed McNish for tenth place, then ran wide. He made a second, successful attempt on the eighth lap, passing McNish who opted against a challenge.

That same lap, Massa entered the pit lane to join the list of retirees with a failed left-rear suspension; it failed in turn two, causing the Sauber C21's right-front wheel to lift from the tarmac surface and its undertray to scrape along it. Villeneuve made a pass on Fisichella for ninth place on lap ten. Not long after Villeneuve overtook Button for eighth position. By the same lap, Barrichello led by a second over his Michael Schumacher, who in turn was 17 seconds ahead of Ralf Schumacher. Further down the order, Frentzen put a rear wheel on the grass at the final corner on lap 16. He lost control of his car, spun through 180 degrees and rolled backwards in front of the race leaders. Frentzen fell to 18th position, behind the Minardi cars of Webber and Yoong. He passed Yoong to return to 17th position on the 18th lap. One lap later, Villeneuve overtook Salo on the inside for seventh place and blocked Salo's attempted counter-move.

As the Ferraris extended their lead over Ralf Schumacher, the stewards informed the BAR team on the 23rd lap Villeneuve had incurred a drive-through penalty as they deemed him at fault for the collision with Frentzen on lap one. Lap 24 saw the safety car's first deployment by the race director: Panis' engine seized without warning on the start/finish straight. His rear wheels locked, spun to the centre of the track and avoided hitting the barrier. Track marshals removed Panis' car from the circuit as he returned to the pit lane. The Ferrari and Williams' teams employed different pit stop strategies—the Ferrari team planned for two stops whereas the Williams team planned one. The Ferrari team called Barrichello and Michael Schumacher into the pit lane for their first pit stops; Schumacher drove more slowly than Barrichello to allow their mechanics to service the latter's car first. Barrichello retained the lead as Michael Schumacher yielded second to Ralf Schumacher. The safety car was withdrawn at the conclusion of the 27th lap and Barrichello led at the restart.

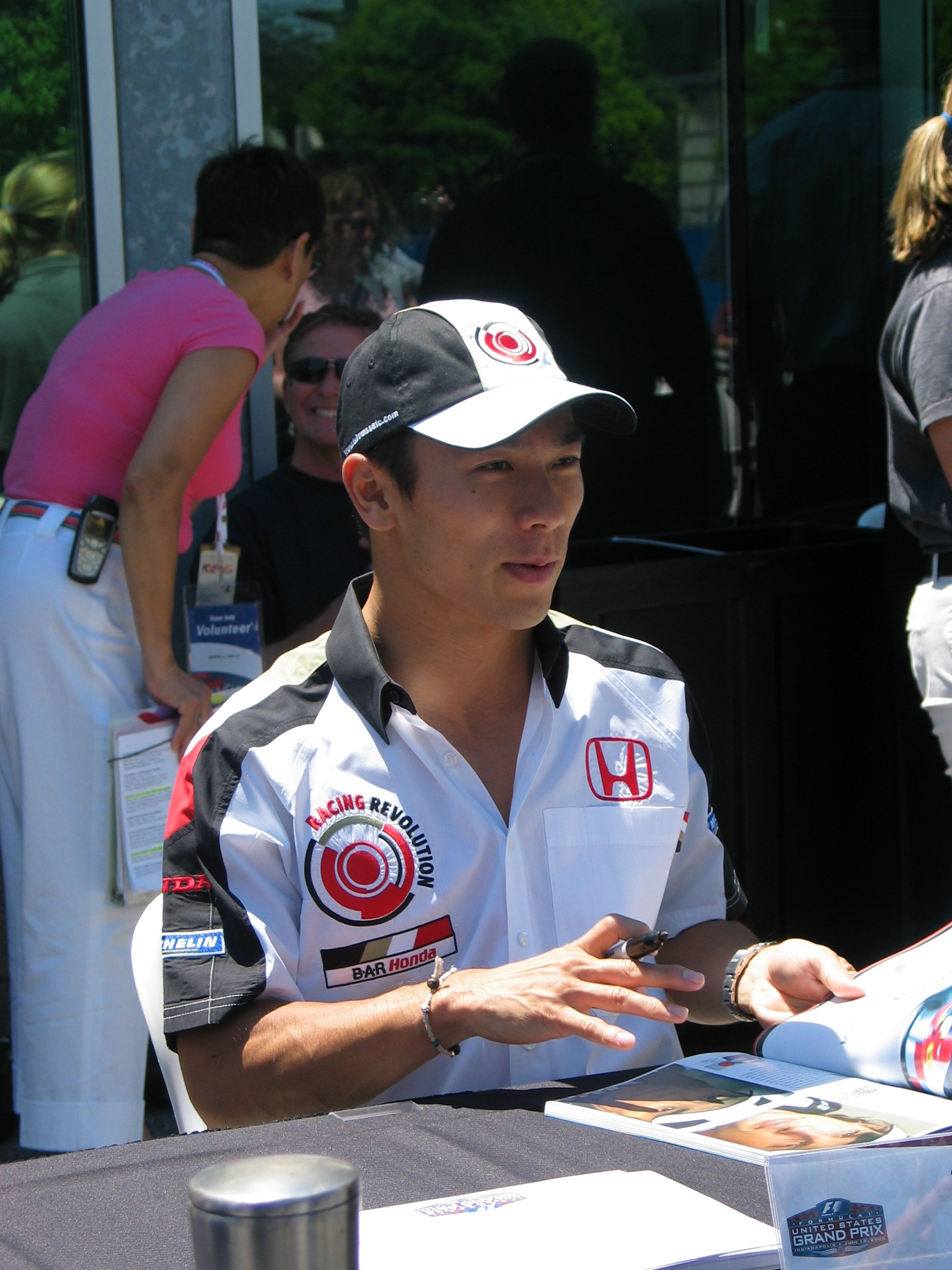
Takuma Sato (pictured in 2005) was involved in a heavy accident that caused soft-tissue damage to his right thigh.

Soon after, a major accident prompted the safety car's second deployment on lap 28. As the field entered the right-hand turn two situated atop a hill, Heidfeld noticed smoke coming from Yoong's Minardi and applied his cold brakes heavily, locking his rear wheels and sending him out of control about 100 yd (91 m) from the apex. He veered into the grass at approximately 280 km/h (170 mph) as his car spun 180 degrees; the grass did not slow him, and was launched over the crest of a hill. Montoya on the inside was about to lap Sato's slower car at turn two, with the latter ahead at the apex. At high speed, Heidfeld narrowly avoided hitting Montoya's front wing, and the rear of his Sauber sustained a side collision against the right-hand sidepod of Sato's car, causing heavy damage to both vehicles and littering carbon fibre and titanium debris over a wide area of track following the 47G impact. Heidfeld's rear structure and titanium gearbox punctured a hole in Sato's car; his knees struck the steering column breaking it in half. Both drivers were sent into a gravel trap and came to a stop there.

A visibly shaken Heidfeld was extricated from his car by track marshals with a heavily bruised left leg. After Sato's car absorbed enough energy in the accident, he remained in it because he was trapped. He sustained soft-tissue damage to his right thigh, but did not lose consciousness; a section of the Sauber's rear crash structure penetrated the side of the Jordan's monocoque just below Sato's right knee and his helmet was squeezed between the car's head restraint, both of which stopped him leaving his car. The Fédération Internationale de l'Automobile (FIA, Formula One's governing body) safety and medical delegate Sid Watkins and his team took ten minutes to remove Sato from the car and treated him at the crash site before transporting him by ambulance to the track's medical centre. From there, Sato and Heidfeld were flown by helicopter to Graz University Hospital, for overnight observation and precautionary x-ray scans. Under safety car conditions, every team apart from Ferrari and Williams brought their drivers to the pit lane for additional fuel and a set of tyres. After 20 minutes, the race restarted at lap 36's end when the safety car entered the pit lane. Barrichello led Ralf Schumacher, Michael Schumacher, Montoya, Coulthard and Fisichella. On lap 37, Webber passed Yoong for 13th.

Villeneuve passed Fisichella for sixth place at the start of the 38th lap. On the same lap, Irvine entered the pit lane to retire with hydraulics failure. Two laps later, Villeneuve caught and overtook Coulthard at turn one for fifth. Coulthard lost sixth place to Fisichella after driving on oil and off the circuit on the 45th lap. On the same lap Trulli pulled over at the end of the pit lane wall on the main straight to retire from with a loss of fuel pressure. Yoong retired with fire visible from the rear of his Minardi soon after. Green flag pit stops began on lap 47. Ralf Schumacher made a pit stop and dropped to fifth position. Montoya remained on the track for another four laps and used more fuel in an attempt to overtake Ralf Schumacher. Montoya entered the pit lane for tyres on the 51st lap. He returned to the race in fourth position, ahead of his teammate Ralf Schumacher. Villeneuve was elevated to third position until a pit stop on lap 53 demoted him to ninth. Montoya and Ralf Schumacher returned to third and fourth respectively.

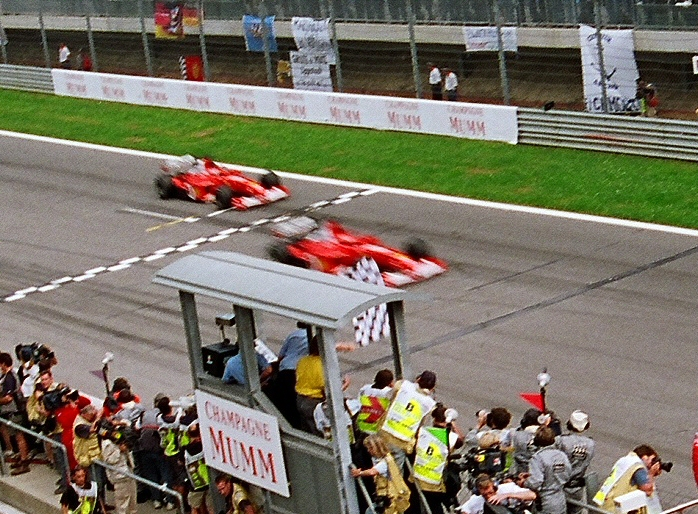
Ferrari invoked team orders to allow Michael Schumacher past his teammate Rubens Barrichello to win the race and earn the maximum number of points towards the World Drivers' Championship.

Barrichello entered the pit lane for the second time on the 61st lap. His fuel stop took 6.2 seconds and he exited in second place. Michael Schumacher led lap 62 and made his second pit stop at the end of the lap. He returned to the race in second position; Barrichello returned to first. On the 63rd lap, as the pits had been completed and as had been discussed prior to race according to Ferrari team principal Jean Todt and Ferrari technical director Ross Brawn, Todt invoked team orders on Barrichello to relinquish the victory to his teammate. (Note: It was the second year in succession that Barrichello had been asked to relinquish a position to Michael Schumacher on the start/finish straight on the last lap, as he had done so for second position at the 2001 Austrian Grand Prix.) This would improve Michael Schumacher's position in the World Drivers' Championship, with a win earning him ten points. In a 2012 interview, Barrichello stated that, whilst he was not allowed to say exactly what was Ferrari's threat, "it was a form of threat that made [him] think about re-thinking [his] life, because the great joy for [him] was driving". Barrichello radioed Todt of a promise he made (after the same race in 2001) not to relinquish a victory to a driver. This prompted Todt to reply to Barrichello he was required to obey his instruction in order to preserve Ferrari's "best interests". Personnel on the Ferrari pit gantry observed the television screens and noticed Michael Schumacher could not get close enough to pass Barrichello in the final seven laps.

At the start of the final lap, Barrichello led Michael Schumacher by one second. As Barrichello entered the final corner, Brawn informed Michael Schumacher over the radio his teammate would yield to him. When Barrichello braked in the final 100 to 50 yd (91 to 46 m) to comply with Ferrari's instruction, Michael Schumacher slowed more than his teammate because he had hoped that no team orders would be applied. Schumacher passed Barrichello for his fourth win in a row in 2002, and the 58th of his career in a time of 1 hour, 33 minutes and 51.562 seconds at an average speed of 196.334 km/h (121.996 mph). Barrichello was 0.182 seconds behind in second position with Montoya 17.7 seconds adrift in third. Montoya's teammate Ralf Schumacher finished in fourth place. Fisichella was fifth and took the first two points of the season for the Jordan team. Coulthard took the final point in sixth position, ahead of Button's Renault and the Toyotas of Salo and McNish. A loss of hydraulic pressure caused Villeneuve's engine to fail on the final lap; he was classified tenth. Frentzen and Webber for the Arrows and Minardi teams were the final finishers, albeit two laps behind the race winner.

== Post-race ==
The Ferrari team were booed, jeered, whistled at and given a thumbs down signal by the crowd in parc fermé and on the podium. Michael Schumacher insisted Barrichello mount the first step on the podium, as "Deutschlandlied" was played. Schumacher was grabbed by the neck by Barrichello and stood beside his teammate when "Il Canto degli Italiani" played. Wolfgang Schüssel, the Chancellor of Austria, presented the winner's trophy to Schumacher who proceeded to give it to Barrichello. Barrichello's race engineer Gabriele Delli Colli joined him on the podium to receive the winning manufacturer's award. Later in the press conference, where loud boos were heard despite Barrichello's pleas for no booing, Barrichello said of the situation, "I'm going through a period of a very good time of my life. I'm becoming a better person, a better driver, so there's no point in arguing. I think my determination will bring me a lot more wins, so that's the way I see it, so there's no point arguing." Michael Schumacher said he understood Ferrari's decision as "the team is investing a lot of money for one sort of target and imagine in the end it wouldn't be enough by this amount of points, how stupid would we look?" Montoya said the two safety car periods allowed him to pass his teammate Ralf Schumacher, "Ralf was quite quick out of the pits as well, but I managed to get a few laps in really quick right before the stop and that was enough."

Sato and Heidfeld were deemed fit to compete at the Monaco Grand Prix held two weeks later after passing fitness tests. Sid Watkins told Eddie Jordan, the owner of the Jordan team, that Sato had "a miraculous escape", leading Jordan to remark, "Somebody up there likes him." Sato said he had not observed Heidfeld approaching him, "When I opened my eyes I could see my legs were squashed by the damaged monocoque and I could see the ground through the hole. Although there was some pain, I knew nothing was broken. The car did a great job of saving me – I hear there was nothing left of it." Heidfeld admitted he was at fault for causing the crash, "I saw a cloud of tyre smoke as [Alex] Yoong braked really hard and early ahead of us, and maybe I pressed the pedal too hard as a result while the brakes were still cool. The car got away from me and next thing I knew I was going backwards down the grass." That the injuries Sato sustained in the accident were minor was cited as a consequence of improved safety standards undertaken by the FIA, racing teams and medical experts since the 1970s.

Ralf Schumacher praised his car for allowing him to finish fourth, "Due to the action packed race and the different strategies it is difficult to say how big Ferrari's advantage really was here on the A1-Ring. We have to continue to work hard, this much is clear." Fisichella commented on his fifth-place finish, "It's been a very, very good day for me, as I didn't expect to score points. But, the most important thing is that Takuma is alright. It felt fantastic when I crossed the line and I would like to say thank you to the team, especially because we made the right pit stop decision." The race result increased Michael Schumacher's lead in the Drivers' Championship to 27 championship points over Montoya in second. Ralf Schumacher was third with 23 championship points. Barrichello overtook Coulthard for fourth with 12 championship points. In the Constructors' Championship, Ferrari further extended their advantage over the Williams team to 16 championship points. McLaren maintained third position with 14 championship points. The Renault and Sauber teams continued to hold fourth and fifth places with eleven races left in the season.

=== Team orders ===
Although they have been part of the history of Formula One since its very beginning and continuing into the 21st century, being a team sport, Ferrari's use of team orders to determine the finishing order overshadowed the race. Reuters cited it as the most "particularly blatant" application of team orders applied to favour one driver over another since Coulthard relinquished first position to his McLaren teammate Mika Häkkinen in the final lap of the 1997 European Grand Prix to comply with a team agreement. Incidentally, the following race would see a further manipulation, as Coulthard would move over again to allow Hakkinen past with three laps remaining in order to follow through on a gentleman's agreement. This and other team orders during the season, such as the 1998 Belgian Grand Prix, prompted some discussions about the issue but did not lead to any ban; in both cases, Coulthard and Barrichello decided to slowdown only at the last moments of the final lap, which made it even more controversial, and Coulthard also allegedly received threats over the radio in 1997 five years prior. Ferrari were heavily condemned by fans on the internet, some members of the Formula One community, the world press, and Brazilian president Fernando Henrique Cardoso. (Note: An Italian online betting company and the Swedish public lottery Svenska Spel paid out those who bet on Barrichello to win the Grand Prix.) Despite being a supporter of Ferrari and Michael Schumacher, Australian commentator Darrell Eastlake argued that it was the "most bloody disgraceful thing I've ever seen in my life" and Schumacher "should have had the balls to move aside and let Barrichello win". Some Formula One figures held different views, including the Williams pair of Montoya and Ralf Schumacher, as well as Irvine, who all stated their belief Michael Schumacher should not be apportioned blame for winning the Grand Prix through team orders. Jody Scheckter (the 1979 Formula One World Champion) and Ron Dennis defended Ferrari's application of team orders as a means of enhancing Michael Schumacher's position in the championship.

The day after the race, the FIA summoned Ferrari and its drivers to a meeting of the FIA World Motor Sport Council in Paris on 26 June to explain why the team ordered Barrichello to yield the victory to Michael Schumacher and their actions on the podium. At a press conference on 24 May, FIA president Max Mosley stated while Ferrari had not transgressed the regulations concerning team orders, the meeting would establish the appropriate punishment in the event a panel deemed if any rules were broken, "There are rules about interfering with competition but we established a long time ago that team orders are allowed." That same day, Mosley said on the FIA's behalf he wrote a letter of apology to Schüssel. At the meeting, the FIA deemed Ferrari to have transgressed series regulations when Michael Schumacher chose not to mount the first position on the podium and handed the trophy given to him by the Chancellor of Austria to his teammate Barrichello. The council also determined the team had not committed any violation when it invoked team orders on Barrichello to relinquish the victory to Michael Schumacher. It imposed a fine of $1 million on Ferrari, Michael Schumacher, and Barrichello, half of which was paid immediately and divided into equal amounts between the trio; the remainder was suspended for one year on the condition a similar offence did not occur. Neither a points deduction nor a race ban were imposed.

In response to the controversy, Mosley established a four-member working group to discuss team orders and invited the public to lend their opinion on the practice on the FIA's website. The FIA accepted feedback from 5 July to 1 September, which was passed on to the working group. They reviewed it and gave their recommendations to the governing body. At a meeting of the 26-member Formula One Commission on 28 October, it was confirmed "team orders that interfere with the race result" would be barred from the 2003 season onwards. Thereafter, teams employed coded messages to loophole the rule on team orders. During the 2010 German Grand Prix, Ferrari employed a coded message to invoke team orders allowing driver Fernando Alonso, who was 31 points ahead of his teammate going into the race, to pass Massa and win the race; Ferrari denied that it was a team order. The parallels between how Michael Schumacher and Alonso won those races was the catalyst of the FIA rescinding the regulation barring team orders because it was deemed difficult to enforce. Despite both being legal as in Austria, team orders since then, most notability the 2013 Malaysian Grand Prix and its Multi-Map 21, which was in fact not respecting the team order, and the 2018 Russian Grand Prix, which was more similar to Austria, continued to echo controversy or criticism.

Although Ferrari and Michael Schumacher were the reigning World Champions, they had narrowly lost the 1997 and 1998 championships, in addition to the 1999 Drivers' Championship, despite Michael Schumacher letting his World Championship contender teammate Irvine win upon his return from injury, and Formula One World Championships had been decided by less than the four points Barrichello gave up, a point that was also made by Ross Brawn. During the 2002 season, Ferrari continued to use team orders, including telling Michael Schumacher to hold position behind Barrichello for another one-two finish a month later at the 2002 European Grand Prix and at the 2002 Hungarian Grand Prix, as Michael Schumacher vowed to pay back Barrichello, who also went on to win the 2002 Italian Grand Prix, for giving him the win in Austria; they did not cause any significant uproar or controversy, as they were limited to tell the drivers to hold position rather than exchange it as was done in Austria. Months later at the 2002 United States Grand Prix, Michael Schumacher went for a dead heat finish with Barrichello, who ultimately won by 0.011 seconds, and was interpreted as a way of repaying Barrichello for Austria, a hypothesis Ferrari rejected. In November 2010, Todt admitted to La Stampa he should have avoided invoking team orders on Barrichello due to his subsequent belief Michael Schumacher would have won the championship without significant competition. (Note: Stefano Mancini: "The most sensational team order remains yours at Zeltweg 2002. What did you say to Barrichello to convince him?" Jean Todt: "I shouldn't have said anything to him. We agreed first: 'If you're in front after the pit stop, you have to let Schumacher pass without causing any trouble.' He agreed: after all, a pilot is paid to accept certain decisions. Instead he remained in front. I called him fifty times and told him clearly; he ducked at the last corner, the crowd booed, Schumi gave him first place at the podium ceremony and Ferrari was fined for the violation of protocol: 500 thousand dollars." Stefano Mancini: "Regretful?" Jean Todt: "Regretful because with hindsight it could have been avoided: Schumacher would have won the championship anyway. But I would have regretted it more if I had lost the title by a couple of points.") In February 2017, Brawn reiterated Todt's opinion to British magazine Autosport and stated the negative consequences for Formula One outweighed the positives, calling it "on reflection ... a mistake".

=== Race classification ===
Drivers who scored championship points are denoted in bold.

Pos	No.	Driver	Constructor	Tyre	Laps	Time/Retired	Grid	Points
1	1	(Germany) **Michael Schumacher**	**Ferrari**	B	71	1:33:51.562	3	10
2	2	(Brazil) **Rubens Barrichello**	**Ferrari**	B	71	+0.182	1	6
3	6	(Colombia) **Juan Pablo Montoya**	**Williams-BMW**	M	71	+17.730	4	4
4	5	(Germany) **Ralf Schumacher**	**Williams-BMW**	M	71	+18.448	2	3
5	9	(Italy) **Giancarlo Fisichella**	**Jordan-Honda**	B	71	+49.965	15	2
6	3	(United Kingdom) **David Coulthard**	**McLaren-Mercedes**	M	71	+50.672	8	1
7	15	(United Kingdom) Jenson Button	Renault	M	71	+51.229	13	
8	24	(Finland) Mika Salo	Toyota	M	71	+1:09.425	10	
9	25	(United Kingdom) Allan McNish	Toyota	M	71	+1:09.718	14	
10	11	(Canada) Jacques Villeneuve	BAR-Honda	B	70	Engine	17	
11	20	(Germany) Heinz-Harald Frentzen	Arrows-Cosworth	B	69	+2 Laps	11	
12	23	(Australia) Mark Webber	Minardi-Asiatech	M	69	+2 Laps	21	
Ret	14	(Italy) Jarno Trulli	Renault	M	44	Fuel pressure	16	
Ret	22	(Malaysia) Alex Yoong	Minardi-Asiatech	M	42	Engine	22	
Ret	16	(United Kingdom) Eddie Irvine	Jaguar-Cosworth	M	38	Hydraulics	20	
Ret	7	(Germany) Nick Heidfeld	Sauber-Petronas	B	27	Collision	5	
Ret	10	(Japan) Takuma Sato	Jordan-Honda	B	26	Collision	18	
Ret	12	(France) Olivier Panis	BAR-Honda	B	22	Engine	9	
Ret	8	(Brazil) Felipe Massa	Sauber-Petronas	B	7	Suspension	7	
Ret	4	(Finland) Kimi Räikkönen	McLaren-Mercedes	M	5	Engine	6	
Ret	21	(Brazil) Enrique Bernoldi	Arrows-Cosworth	B	2	Collision	12	
Ret	17	(Spain) Pedro de la Rosa	Jaguar-Cosworth	M	0	Throttle	19	

== Championship standings after the race ==
Drivers' Championship standings

+/–	Pos	Driver	Points
	1	(Germany) Michael Schumacher	54
	2	(Colombia) Juan Pablo Montoya	27
	3	(Germany) Ralf Schumacher	23
2	4	(Brazil) Rubens Barrichello	12
1	5	(United Kingdom) David Coulthard	10

Constructors' Championship standings

+/–	Pos	Constructor	Points
	1	(Italy) Ferrari	66
	2	(United Kingdom) Williams-BMW	50
	3	(United Kingdom) McLaren-Mercedes	14
	4	(France) Renault	8
	5	(Switzerland) Sauber-Petronas	8
Sources:

- Note: Only the top five positions are included for both sets of standings.

== Footnotes ==
Previous race: 2002 Spanish Grand Prix	FIA Formula One World Championship; 2002 season	Next race: 2002 Monaco Grand Prix
Previous race: 2001 Austrian Grand Prix	Austrian Grand Prix	Next race: 2003 Austrian Grand Prix
