= 2002 Monaco Grand Prix =

Coordinates: 43°44′4.74″N 7°25′16.8″E

Race 7 of 17 in the 2002 Formula One World Championship
← Previous race	Next race →

Race details
- Date: 26 May 2002
- Official name: Grand Prix de Monaco 2002
- Location: Circuit de Monaco, Monaco
- Course: Street circuit
- Course length: 3.370 km (2.094 miles)
- Distance: 78 laps, 262.860 km (163.334 miles)
- Weather: Fine; air temperature 22 °C (72 °F)

Pole position
Driver	(Colombia) Juan Pablo Montoya	Williams-BMW
- Time: 1:16.676

Fastest lap
Driver	(Brazil) Rubens Barrichello	Ferrari
- Time: 1:18.023 on lap 68 (lap record)

Podium
First	(United Kingdom) David Coulthard	McLaren-Mercedes
Second	(Germany) Michael Schumacher	Ferrari
Third	(Germany) Ralf Schumacher	Williams-BMW

The 2002 Monaco Grand Prix (formally the Grand Prix de Monaco 2002) was a Formula One motor race held on 26 May 2002 at the Circuit de Monaco in Monte Carlo. It was the seventh race of seventeen in the 2002 Formula One World Championship, and the 60th Monaco Grand Prix. McLaren's David Coulthard won the 78-lap race after starting from second position. Ferrari's Michael Schumacher finished in second and Williams's Ralf Schumacher was third.

Heading into the race, Michael Schumacher led the World Drivers' Championship and his team Ferrari led the World Constructors Championship. Williams's Juan Pablo Montoya secured pole position after setting the fastest lap time in the one-hour qualifying session. However, Coulthard made a faster start and took the lead in the race. Coulthard held the lead throughout the race, securing his 12th career win and his second in Monaco. Michael Schumacher pressed Coulthard in the final 26 laps of the Grand Prix, finishing second by 1.050 seconds.

Following the event, Michael Schumacher strengthened his World Drivers' Championship lead to 33 championship points. Ralf Schumacher's third-place finish put him tied for second in the championship standings with teammate Montoya, who retired from the race due to an engine failure. With ten races remaining in the season, Ferrari increased their World Constructors Championship advantage over Williams to 18 points.

== Background ==
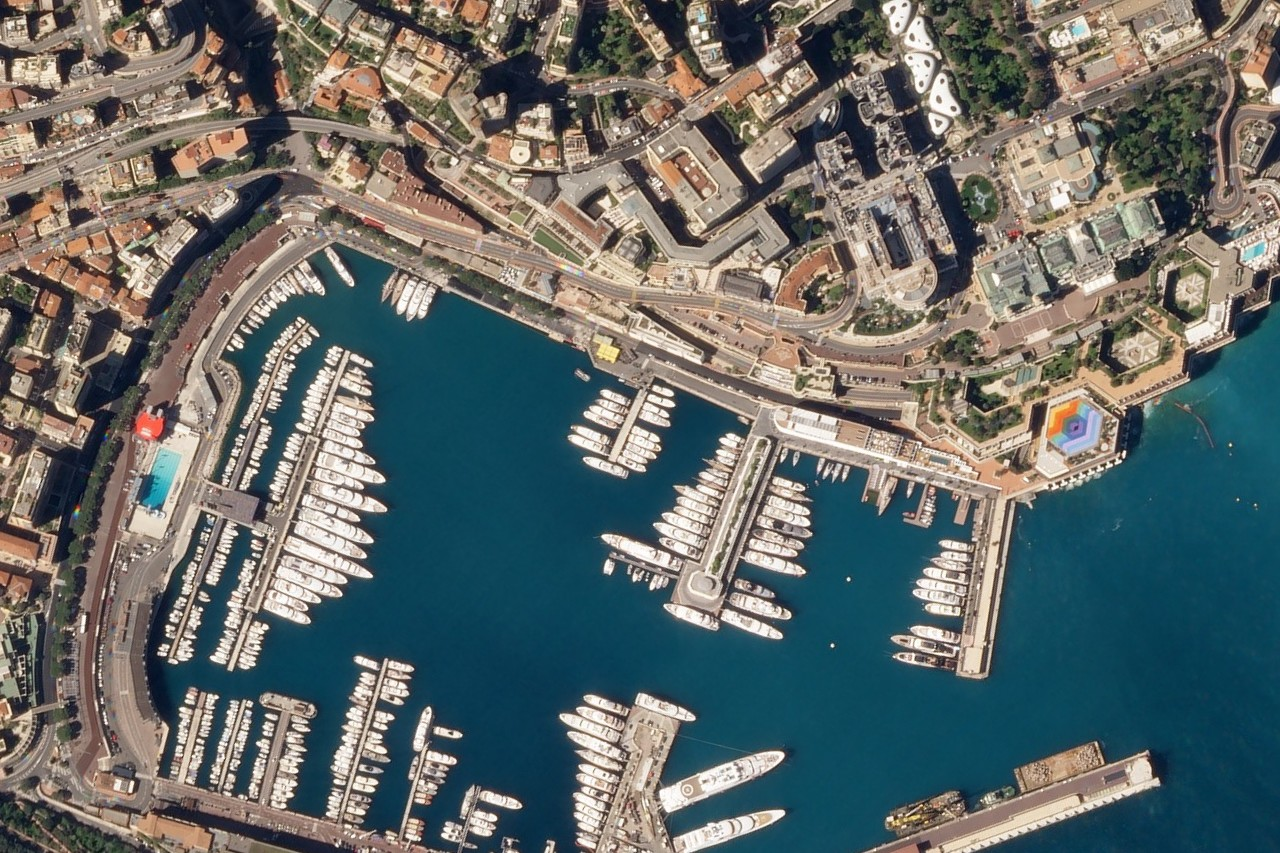
The Circuit de Monaco (pictured in 2018), where the Grand Prix was held

The 2002 Monaco Grand Prix was the 7th of the 17 rounds in the 2002 Formula One World Championship and the 60th edition of the event. It was held at the 19-turn 3.370 km (2.094 mi) Circuit de Monaco between La Condamine and Monte Carlo on 26 May. Going into the race, Ferrari's Michael Schumacher led the World Drivers' Championship with 54 championship points, ahead of Williams's Juan Pablo Montoya on 27 and his teammate Ralf Schumacher on 23. Ferrari's Rubens Barrichello was fourth with 12 championship points and McLaren's David Coulthard was fifth with 10 championship points. Ferrari led the World Constructors' Championship with 65 championship points, 16 ahead of Williams and 52 ahead of McLaren. Renault and Sauber had eight championship points each.

Following the Austrian Grand Prix on 12 May, the teams tested at various European racing circuits to prepare for the Monaco Grand Prix. The British American Racing (BAR), Jordan, Renault and Williams teams tested variously between 14 and 18 May at the Circuit Ricardo Tormo in Spain. Sauber tested for four days at a shortened configuration of the Circuit Paul Ricard in France, joined by Arrows, McLaren and Toyota for the final three days. Luciano Burti, Ferrari's test driver, tested for three days at the Circuito de Jerez in Spain, and BAR's test driver Anthony Davidson spent two days at Jerez. Ferrari spent four days at the Fiorano Circuit in Italy, and also two days at the Mugello Circuit in Italy. Minardi did not test during this period.

Many were upset when Barrichello was told by Ferrari to hand the win over to his teammate Michael Schumacher at the end of the previous round in Austria. Despite the controversy, Ferrari sporting director Jean Todt said the public would be eager to observe his team's next actions. Michael Schumacher, who had won five of the preceding six races, said he intended to outpace Barrichello in Monaco and did not anticipate being jeered by the crowd. Coulthard finished fifth in the previous year's Monaco Grand Prix after stalling his car and being baulked by Arrows's Enrique Bernoldi. He said of his chances for the 2002 race, "I am of the mind that this may give us an opportunity to qualify better than I have done in previous races and be a genuine podium finisher."

There were eleven teams (each representing a different constructor) with two drivers each for the Grand Prix, with no changes from the season entry list. Although no team used the drastic measures seen the previous year, several teams made aerodynamic changes to their cars in an effort to generate as much downforce as possible on the constrained Monaco circuit. Ferrari fitted new front and rear wings while McLaren modified the MP4-17 car's lower bodywork. McLaren also brought five cars expecting to have some damaged machinery. To increase downforce, other teams such as Arrows, Renault, Sauber, and Williams modified their cars' wings, while Toyota added a number of aerodynamic appendages to the TF102 car's sidewalls and engine cover. Minardi drivers Mark Webber and Alex Yoong both used power steering and Asiatech prepared a revised V10 engine providing additional power at low revs.

== Practice ==
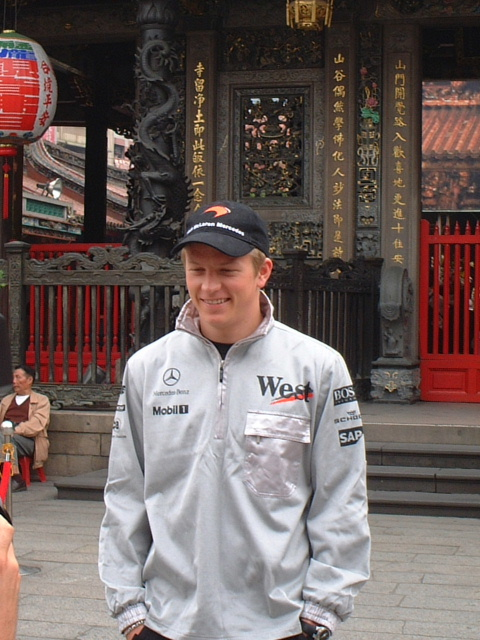
Kimi Räikkönen twice crashed his McLaren during free practice

Preceding the race were two one-hour practice sessions on Thursday and two 45-minute sessions on Saturday. The first practice session was held Thursday morning on a damp track that eventually dried up. The circuit was cool and the weather was overcast. Michael Schumacher lapped fastest with 1:21.094 lap he set 53 minutes in. Coulthard, Renault's Jarno Trulli, Barrichello, Arrows's Heinz-Harald Frentzen, the BAR pair of Jacques Villeneuve and Olivier Panis, Trulli's teammate Jenson Button, McLaren's Kimi Räikkönen and Ralf Schumacher occupied positions second through tenth. After 17 minutes, Pedro de la Rosa understeered his Jaguar at the exit of the Swimming Pool chicane, damaging the nose and front-right suspension. Raikkonen spun backwards rear-first into the outside barrier at La Rascasse entering the turn. The monocoque was beyond repair and the car was left on the circuit.

Later in the afternoon, the second practice session was still cool and overcast. Trulli set the day's fastest lap of 1:18.915 with ten minutes remaining, 0.446 seconds faster than Toyota's Allan McNish. Coulthard, Jordan's Giancarlo Fisichella, McNish's teammate Mika Salo, Ralf Schumacher, Barrichello, Webber, Montoya and Button completed the top ten. After leaving the tunnel, Felipe Massa avoided hitting the wall and proceeded, despite spinning his Sauber car 360 degrees into the Nouvelle Chicane. Yoong damaged the front-right corner against the La Rascasse turn barrier. Practice was stopped for four minutes to let marshals clear the track of carbon fibre debris and removed Yoong's car. Bernoldi's engine failed and laid oil on the circuit up to the Casino Square turn. Eddie Irvine hit the oil and crashed his Jaguar's rear-right wheel into the Massenet corner wall. Massa damaged his car's right-hand side suspension oversteering into the barrier at Tabac corner. Button damaged his Renault's front-left corner against the tyre barrier at the bottom of the hill at Mirabeau turn.

After taking Friday off—a feature of the Grand Prix timetable that was unique to Monaco— (Note: The Friday of the Monaco Grand Prix was declared as a rest day, as it is typically associated with Ascension Day and the roads could re-open for the day.) the third practice session on Saturday morning took place in warm and sunny weather. Barrichello led with a 1:18.385 lap set late in the session, 0.086 seconds faster than teammate Michael Schumacher. Montoya, Trulli, Button, Ralf Schumacher, Räikkönen, Coulthard, Frentzen and Fisichella rounded out the top ten. Although McNish and Webber ran off the track and onto the Sainte Devote escape road, no driver struck the barriers.

It became warmer for the final practice session. Trulli set a lap of 1:17.429 late in the session to go fastest. He was 0.077 seconds faster than Coulthard, followed by Montoya, Ralf Schumacher, the Ferrari pair of Barrichello and Michael Schumacher, Button, Fisichella and Massa positions three through ten. Jordan's Takuma Sato struck the inside kerb with his front-right wheel at the apex of Sainte Devote turn and crashed into the tyre barrier at the exit. Nearly identical to Sato's accident, Räikkönen's McLaren's front-left corner was removed at Sainte Devote corner. At the Swimming Pool complex entrance, a rear-left suspension failure propelled Irvine into the tyre barrier, damaging the Jaguar's rear. Soon after, Webber removed his left-front wheel in the same area.

== Qualifying ==
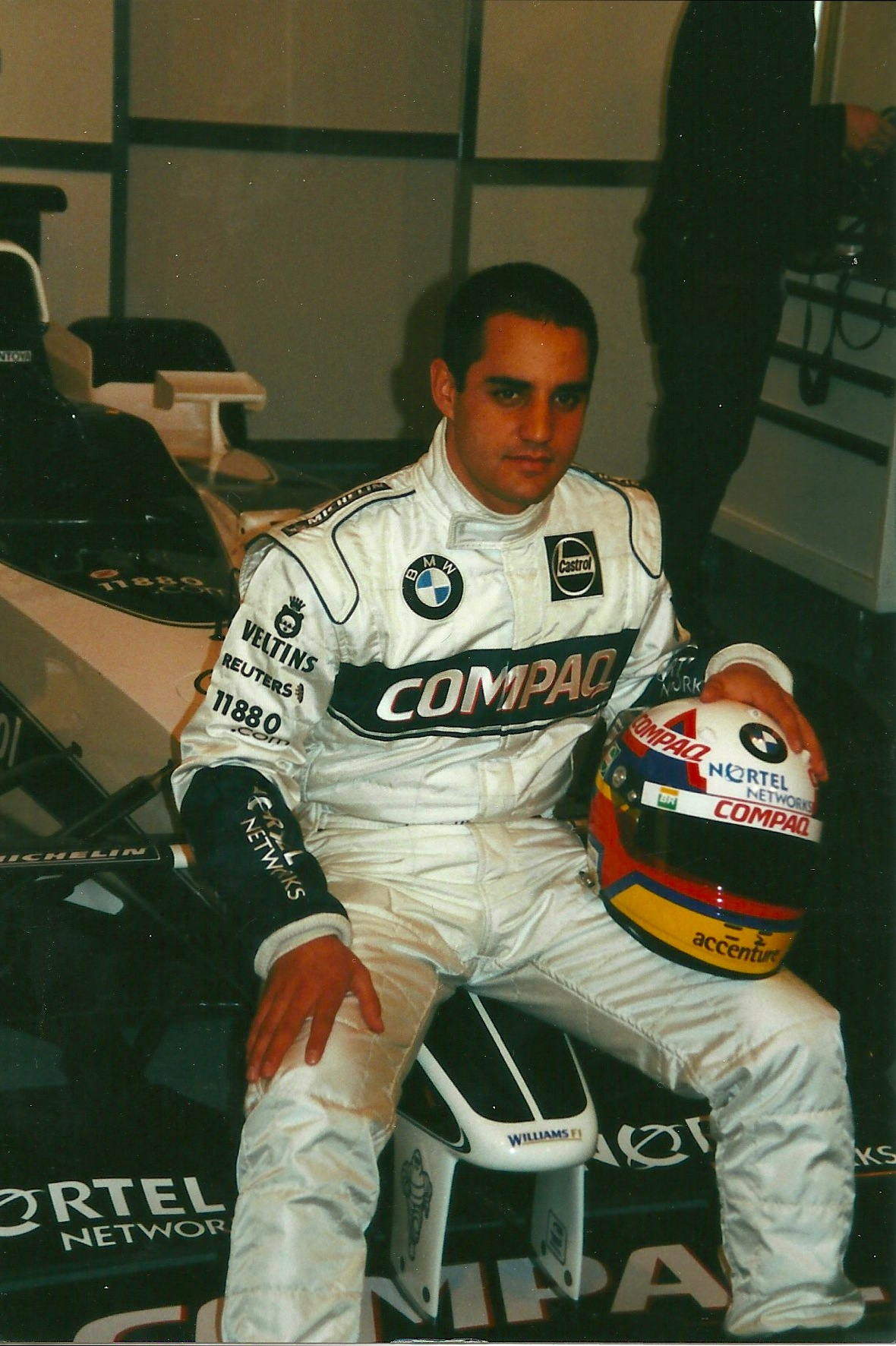
Juan Pablo Montoya (pictured in 2001) qualified on pole position in the one-hour qualifying session for the fifth time in his career.

Each driver was allowed twelve laps during Saturday's one-hour qualifying session, with starting positions determined by the drivers' quickest laps. During this session, the 107% rule was in effect, requiring each driver to remain within 107% of the quickest lap time in order to qualify for the race. A five-driver duel for pole position characterised qualifying, which was sunny and warm. There was also heavy traffic observed around the circuit's narrow confines. During his last run in qualifying, Montoya had no traffic and lapped at 1:16.676, earning him the fifth pole position of his career, the only driver to lap in the 1:16 bracket and was more than seven-tenths of a second faster than Coulthard's 2001 pole lap. Coulthard was second, 0.392 seconds behind, beating his own season-best qualifying result. He felt that he could have improved on his final run but for traffic. A little fragment of grit lodged in Michael Schumacher's left eye during his second run, causing irritation. He received medical treatment with eye drops. A cloud of oil smoke from Räikkönen's car in the tunnel warned him of what he mistook for an on-track incident, so he aborted his first run and finished third. Ralf Schumacher, fourth, was delayed by Frentzen and admitted to not using his tyres to best effect on his last run. Barrichello complained Coulthard impeded him at the chicane during his second run, leaving him fifth. Räikkönen qualified sixth after having to drive Coulthard's spare McLaren due to an issue with his race car's oil engine system. The top six qualifiers were separated by a second. Trulli, seventh, had most of his runs affected by traffic. His teammate Button in eighth was unhappy with his car's balance and made an error on his third run. The two Toyotas qualified in the top ten for the first time. Salo was ninth and McNish tenth. Salo reported his Toyota was more balanced than in Thursday free practice while McNish hit a guard rail early in qualifying, knocking the front suspension slightly out of line and affecting the handling.

Fisichella drove the fastest Honda-powered car to 11th. Heavy traffic prevented Frentzen from managing a clear run and he qualified 12th. Massa qualified in 13th, ahead of his Sauber teammate Nick Heidfeld in 17th. Massa's engine emitted smoke from the engine's left-hand bank of cylinders, but reported decent car balance and grip. According to Villeneuve, 14th, his car performed well on a set of scrubbed tyres but worse on new ones. Bernoldi improved on each of his runs to clinch 15th. Sato struggled to adapt his favoured racing setup to the changeable condition and understeer he encountered during qualifying, ultimately qualifying in 16th. Heidfeld claimed that the amount of grip his car had during the morning free practice sessions had decreased. Panis in 18th was four positions behind his teammate Villeneuve. Yoong impeded Panis's third run, which was his quickest, and failed to improve on his final run. Following hydraulic issues on his third run that prompted him to enter the pit lane, Webber qualified 19th in the rebuilt Minardi PS02, which had been repaired after his accident two days prior. The Jaguar duo of De la Rosa and Irvine took 20th and 21st, respectively. After his crash earlier in the day, Irvine drove the spare Jaguar, and De la Rosa had no mechanical problems. Yoong crashed into the wall five minutes into qualifying after locking up into Sainte Devote's corner on his first run. He drove the spare Minardi car setup for his teammate Webber and lapped within the 107% limit on his last run to claim 22nd.

=== Qualifying classification ===
Pos	No	Driver	Constructor	Lap	Gap	Grid
1	6	(Colombia) Juan Pablo Montoya	Williams-BMW	1:16.676	—	1
2	3	(United Kingdom) David Coulthard	McLaren-Mercedes	1:17.068	+0.392	2
3	1	(Germany) Michael Schumacher	Ferrari	1:17.118	+0.442	3
4	5	(Germany) Ralf Schumacher	Williams-BMW	1:17.274	+0.598	4
5	2	(Brazil) Rubens Barrichello	Ferrari	1:17.357	+0.681	5
6	4	(Finland) Kimi Räikkönen	McLaren-Mercedes	1:17.660	+0.984	6
7	14	(Italy) Jarno Trulli	Renault	1:17.710	+1.034	7
8	15	(United Kingdom) Jenson Button	Renault	1:18.132	+1.456	8
9	24	(Finland) Mika Salo	Toyota	1:18.234	+1.558	9
10	25	(United Kingdom) Allan McNish	Toyota	1:18.292	+1.616	10
11	9	(Italy) Giancarlo Fisichella	Jordan-Honda	1:18.342	+1.666	11
12	20	(Germany) Heinz-Harald Frentzen	Arrows-Cosworth	1:18.607	+1.931	12
13	8	(Brazil) Felipe Massa	Sauber-Petronas	1:19.006	+2.330	13
14	11	(Canada) Jacques Villeneuve	BAR-Honda	1:19.252	+2.576	14
15	21	(Brazil) Enrique Bernoldi	Arrows-Cosworth	1:19.412	+2.736	15
16	10	(Japan) Takuma Sato	Jordan-Honda	1:19.461	+2.785	16
17	7	(Germany) Nick Heidfeld	Sauber-Petronas	1:19.500	+2.824	17
18	12	(France) Olivier Panis	BAR-Honda	1:19.569	+2.893	18
19	23	(Australia) Mark Webber	Minardi-Asiatech	1:19.674	+2.998	19
20	17	(Spain) Pedro de la Rosa	Jaguar-Cosworth	1:19.796	+3.120	20
21	16	(United Kingdom) Eddie Irvine	Jaguar-Cosworth	1:20.139	+3.463	21
22	22	(Malaysia) Alex Yoong	Minardi-Asiatech	1:21.599	+4.923	22
107% time: 1:22.043

== Warm-up ==
On race morning, a half-hour warm-up session was held for teams to shake down their race and spare cars in partially cloudy and warm conditions. Frentzen lapped fastest with a time of 1:20.875 set in the warm-up's final minute. He was followed by Michael Schumacher, Coulthard, Trulli, Räikkönen, Barrichello, Ralf Schumacher, Panis, Fisichella and Salo in positions two through ten. Although there were no accidents during warm-up, some drivers went off the track during the session. De la Rosa lost control of his Jaguar at the Swimming Pool chicane towards the end of the session but avoided damaging his car.

== Race ==
The 78-lap race commenced at 14:00 local time. It was dry and sunny before the race with the air temperature between 22 and 24 °C (72 and 75 °F) and the track temperature was at 34 °C (93 °F). Coulthard, on the outside of the grid, started faster than Montoya because he struggled to shift from first to second gear due to either dirt on the track causing the electronics to cut out or the BMW engine bogging down. Coulthard then passed Montoya by preventing him from moving across to defend for the race lead into Sainte Devote turn. Behind them, Michael Schumacher remained third and Ralf Schumacher fourth. Villeneuve was stationary on the grid owing to a clutch trouble, so the marshals moved his car into the pit lane. He rejoined the race one lap down. Trulli's powerful launch control system moved him from seventh to fifth, surpassing Barrichello and Räikkönen. His teammate Button jumped the start when his Renault slipped on the clutch during the start process and pulled off the throttle, disrupting his launch control system. He braked when he realised his error, falling from eighth to 17th. At the conclusion of the first lap, Coulthard led Montoya by 1.1 seconds.

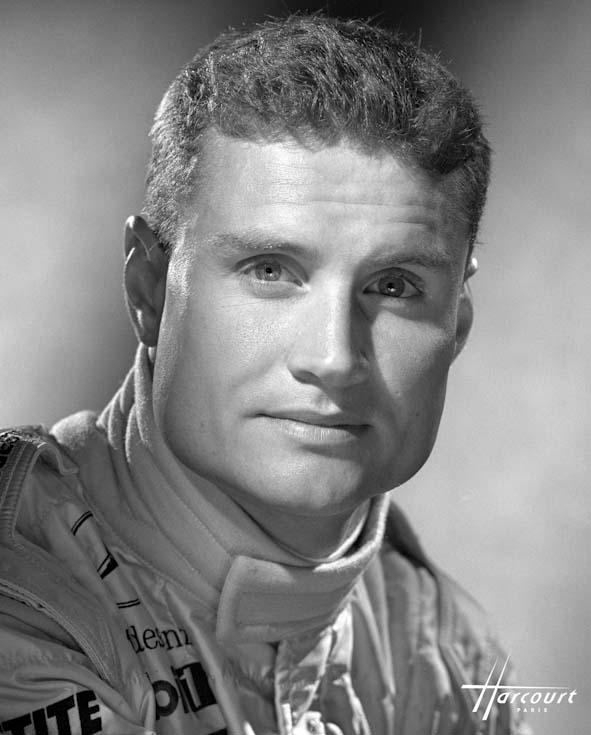
David Coulthard (pictured in 1999) made a faster start than Montoya and led the whole of the race to achieve his second Monaco Grand Prix victory and the 12th of his career.

Coulthard was unable to extend his lead at the front of the field and the top four were tightly bunched as they pulled away. On lap six, Button received a drive-through penalty for jumping the start. He took the penalty on the following lap and fell to the back of the field. Montoya attacked Coulthard for the lead, while Michael Schumacher battled Montoya for second, the latter driving aggressively. Ralf Schumacher, however, held back because of the unpredictability between Michael Schumacher and Montoya. Montoya could not attempt an overtake on Coulthard on the inside due to the circuit's tight confines. From lap 10, Coulthard steadily pulled away as his Michelin tyres began to perform well, while Yoong ran wide at the hairpin, promoting Button to 20th. On lap 16, McNish misjudged his braking point for Sainte Devote corner. He struck the inside kerb, sending him head-on into the outside tyre barrier at the turn's exit. McNish became the race's first retirement but the safety car was not used.

Three laps later, Salo was slowing due to a flailing rear left tyre tread, and Frentzen braked later than him as he exited the tunnel and into the chicane, passing him for eighth. Fisichella then failed to pass his teammate Sato, forcing Massa to cut the chicane, although he was not penalised because he gained no competitive advantage. Sato passed Salo on the inside into Mirabeau corner for ninth on lap 21 and Fisichella followed on the same lap. Sato received team orders to let his teammate Fisichella pass, and he attempted to do so in the tunnel on lap 23, but lost control of his vehicle on the dirty part of the track and crashed into the outside barrier. Fisichella reacted quickly, braking hard, to avoid his teammate, who skidded into the wall outside the tunnel and careened towards the tyre barrier at the chicane. Sato was unhurt. The safety car was not used despite debris on the circuit.

Meanwhile, Bernoldi was racing Massa for 10th when Massa appeared to have problems accelerating out of tighter turns. Bernoldi was the fastest driver on the start/finish straight, passing Massa into Sainte Devote corner at the beginning of lap 29. Massa locked his tyres in Bernoldi's slipstream and was unable to control his car, hitting the rear of Bernoldi's car and pushing him down the Sainte Devote corner escape road. Neither driver retired as a result but Bernoldi fell to 16th and Massa to 18th after returning to the track. Massa made a pit stop for a new nose cone on lap 30. That lap saw smoke emit intermittently from the left-hand exhaust banks on Coulthard's car. He radioed his team to inform them of the problem. Because of a stuck valve in the oil system, the oil pump was delivering too much oil to the engine from the oil transfer valve tank, causing the engine to release oil via the rear cylinders. Mercedes engineers used the McLaren team's pit-to-car telemetry system to modify the pump settings and resolve the problem. This fix allowed Coulthard to continue racing.

On lap 32, Yoong collided with the wall after running over debris at the Casino Square corner entry. He damaged the suspension and drove slowly to the pit lane, retiring from the Grand Prix. Montoya had been struggling to keep up with Coulthard due to tyre issues, and he steadily fell back, delaying Schumacher. The stewards handed Massa a drive-through penalty for colliding with Bernoldi. On lap 40, Barrichello was battling Räikkönen for sixth when he attempted to pass him on the inside but collided with the rear of the McLaren when braking into the chicane. Barrichello's Ferrari went over Räikkönen's McLaren, removing his front wing and damaging Räikkönen's rear. Both drivers went slowly into the pit lane. Barrichello received a new rear wing and rejoined the track with Ferrari, confident in his car's condition. Räikkönen, however, sustained enough rear-end damage to warrant his retirement.

Michael Schumacher was the first of the leaders to make a pit stop on lap 44. His 8.5-second stop dropped him to fourth, behind Ralf Schumacher but ahead of Frentzen. On the same lap, the stewards imposed a ten-second stop-and-go penalty on Barrichello for his collision with Räikkönen. However, he also received a drive-through penalty for exceeding the pit lane speed limit of 60 km/h (37 mph). On lap 47, Montoya suddenly slowed on the start/finish straight, allowing his teammate Ralf Schumacher to take second. Montoya's engine lost power, causing smoke to billow from the back of his car. He pulled down near La Rascasse corner, flames burning the back of his car. Villeneuve entered the list of retired drivers when his engine failed on lap 48. Michael Schumacher reset the race's fastest lap at that point to close up to Coulthard, whose tyres appeared to be heavily worn. Ralf Schumacher made a pit stop to replace his worn tyres on lap 50 and remained in third.

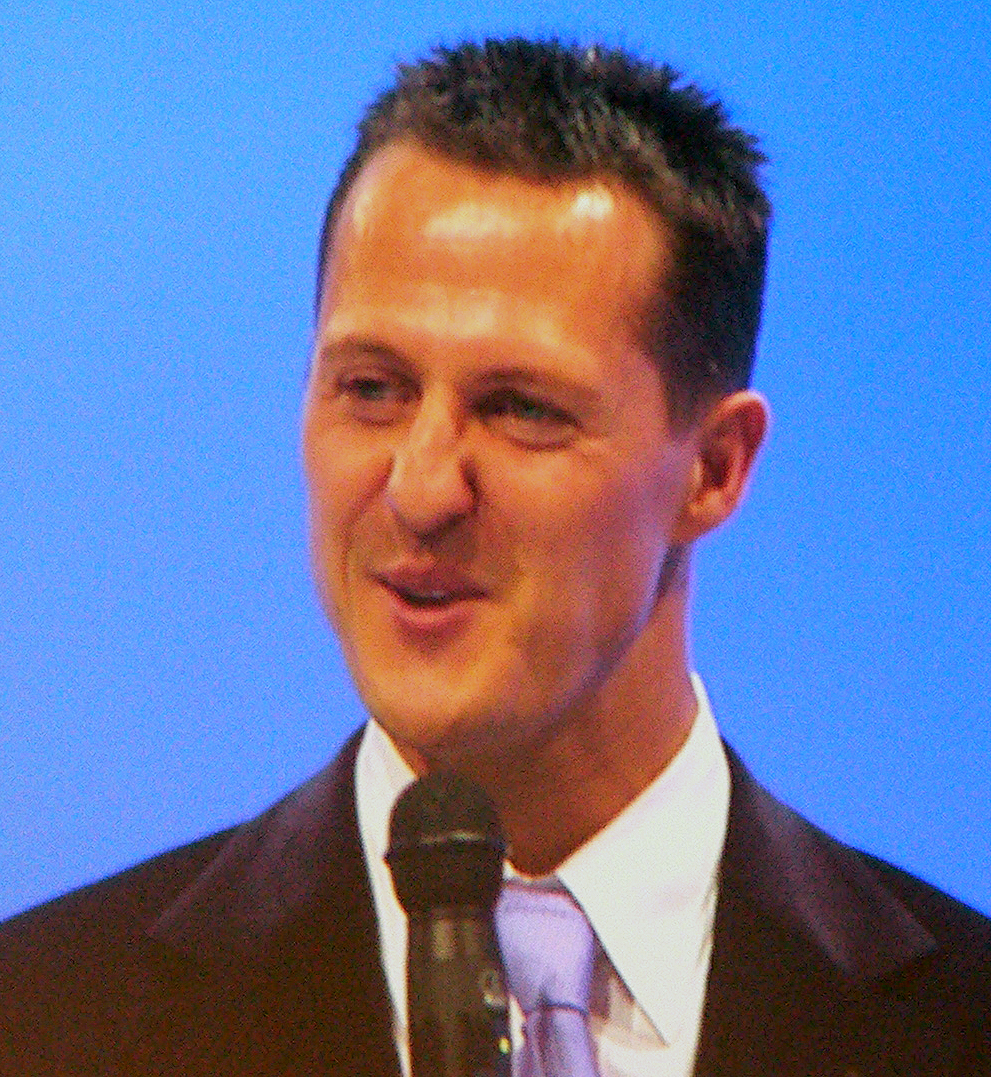
Michael Schumacher (pictured in 2007) finished in second place after pressuring Coulthard for the race win in the final 26 laps.

McLaren reacted to Michael Schumacher's pace by bringing Coulthard into the pit lane at the end of lap 51. His team's 6.9-second pit stop for a new set of tyres allowed Coulthard to maintain the lead, two seconds ahead of Michael Schumacher, who was approaching La Rascasse corner. Michael Schumacher was the fastest driver, closing up to Coulthard in three laps. On lap 53, Button attempted to pass Panis on the inside at Sainte Devote turn, but the two collided when Panis took his line and was caught off guard by the bottleneck turn, hitting the opposite tyre barrier. Their cars were craned off the circuit before the race leaders approached the crash area. In clear air, Coulthard had to scythe his way through slower cars while being pursued from behind by Michael Schumacher.

Ralf Schumacher slowed on lap 65 due to a delamination in the centre of the left rear tyre. He remained in third place after a 6.1-second pit stop for new tyres. On the next lap, Massa's rear brakes failed on the approach to Sainte Devote corner, locking his wheels and colliding with the tyre barrier head-on at high speed. He bounced back to the middle of the escape road, unhurt. The safety car was not deployed since Massa exited his car. Five laps later, Salo was observed locking his front-right wheel due to a front wheel bearing failure caused by brake failure at the top of the hill into Massanet corner. He hit the inside barrier on the kerbing and spun into the outside wall. Salo was unhurt. The marshals' prompt removal of Salo's car from the circuit avoided the need for a safety car.

At the front, Coulthard held off Michael Schumacher for the final 26 laps, leading every lap for his second Monaco Grand Prix win and the 12th of his career. Michael Schumacher was unable to force Coulthard to make a mistake, finishing second, 1.050 seconds back. Ralf Schumacher finished third on the podium, his first racing finish in Monaco. Trulli finished fourth, gaining his first championship points of the season while holding off Fisichella in fifth. Frentzen finished sixth, the final points scorer despite a refuelling rig problem causing a fuel flow problem on his first pit stop, necessitating two pit stops. Barrichello was seventh, battling Frentzen for sixth in the final laps but unable to risk a pass due to the circuit's tight confines. Heidfeld finished eighth after struggling with traction, oversteer and understeer. Irvine and De la Rosa of Jaguar finished ninth and tenth, thanks to the Michelin tyres' performance. Webber finished 11th due to a tyre issue that required a second pit stop. Bernoldi was the final classified finisher, half a minute behind Webber after a slow pit stop in which Arrows had to lift his car from the ground to finish a tyre switch because of his accident with Massa and serving a drive-through penalty for cutting the chicane. Only 12 of the 22 starters finished the Grand Prix.

=== Post-race ===
The top three drivers appeared in Prince Rainier III of Monaco's royal box to collect their trophies and spoke to the media in the following press conference. Coulthard commented on the victory, "It's unbelievable. I feel fantastic because naturally we've had a difficult start to the season. It was looking pretty difficult for us to win a Grand Prix and our hopes were pinned on coming to Monaco that we could have a good performance." Michael Schumacher praised McLaren and said he was aware of the prospect of overtaking Coulthard, and placing second would increase his championship advantage over Montoya, "I knew both and I kept on pushing because in Monaco, nothing is for certain and you really have to go until the last lap, last corner, and that's what I did. I was trying to get my opportunity but he drove a fine race and didn't give me any chance." Ralf Schumacher said he was "pretty happy" to finish at Monaco for the first time in his career and praised his car, "It was good to drive. Obviously not quick enough today, but obviously that was one of the most difficult for us here."

Coulthard's victory was well received in the paddock. McLaren technical director Adrian Newey called Coulthard's win "a happy surprise" and that Monaco had been "the race at which we felt we had the best chance, the one that most suited our car, so it's nice to get the job done." McLaren CEO Ron Dennis was pleased for McLaren but acknowledged it would be difficult for the team for the remainder of the season. Frentzen hailed Coulthard's win and Michael Schumacher finishing second as "more exciting for the Championship", adding, "It certainly makes it more interesting and that is good for the sport." Michelin's Pierre Dupasquier said, "It's nice to stop Michael Schumacher from winning, although I'm not sure that it's possible to keep him off the podium altogether." Coulthard acknowledged that unless Michael Schumacher got injured in the forthcoming races and missed the remainder of the season, he would be unbeatable, adding, "What this win, though, has done is rekindle a lot of the drive and determination in the McLaren camp. We all know both the Ferraris and Williams can be beaten."

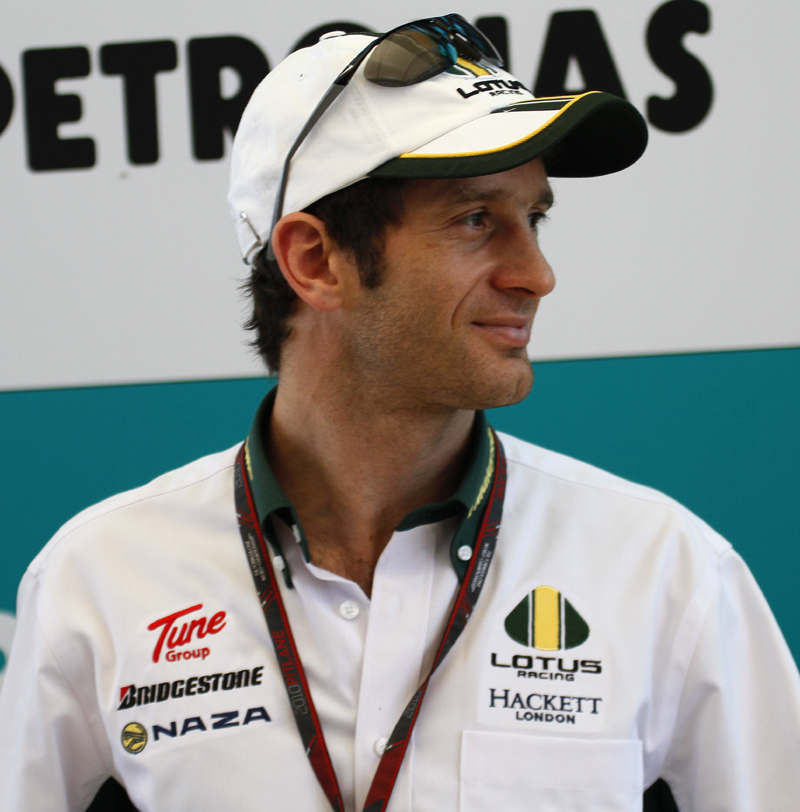
Jarno Trulli (pictured in 2010) finished fourth but it was under threat because of a missing seal on an electronic control unit from his engine. The result later stood after a compliance inspection found no irregularity with the unit.

Trulli said scoring his first championship points of the season was a positive, but believed he could have finished on the podium if he had not been delayed by Heidfeld. Fisichella was delighted to finish fifth, saying, "I expected do well here as I am confident on this circuit, especially when the car is going well." Irvine congratulated his former team Jordan on finishing fifth while team owner Eddie Jordan remarked, "We're back in the land of the living now." Frentzen was pleased to score his and Arrows's second championship point of the season, "Scoring one point puts pressure on us to score more, but it is the right kind of pressure. This point will keep the momentum going." Williams technical director Patrick Head said his team would analyse how Montoya lost the lead at the start. Button said Panis did not notice him when they collided and McNish admitted responsibility for his accident.

A post-race technical check revealed that a paper seal on an electronic control unit from Trulli's engine was missing, breaching the Fédération Internationale de l'Automobile's (FIA) technical regulations and causing concern amongst FIA officials of system software tampering. Two days after the race, a follow-up compliance inspection was held at Renault's factory in Enstone, Oxfordshire. The FIA's technical team found no anomalies with the unit, finalising the race result. The result increased Michael Schumacher's World Drivers' Championship lead to 33 championship points. Ralf Schumacher and teammate Montoya were joint second with 27 championship points each, while Coulthard's victory moved him from fifth to fourth. Ferrari maintained the World Constructors' Championship lead with 72 championship points. With ten races remaining in the season, Williams stayed second and McLaren third.

=== Race classification ===
Drivers who scored championship points are denoted in bold.

Pos	No	Driver	Constructor	Tyre	Laps	Time/Retired	Grid	Points
1	3	(United Kingdom) **David Coulthard**	**McLaren-Mercedes**	M	78	1:45:39.055	2	10
2	1	(Germany) **Michael Schumacher**	**Ferrari**	B	78	+ 1.050	3	6
3	5	(Germany) **Ralf Schumacher**	**Williams-BMW**	M	78	+ 1:17.450	4	4
4	14	(Italy) **Jarno Trulli**	**Renault**	M	77	+ 1 Lap	6	3
5	9	(Italy) **Giancarlo Fisichella**	**Jordan-Honda**	B	77	+ 1 Lap	11	2
6	20	(Germany) **Heinz-Harald Frentzen**	**Arrows-Cosworth**	B	77	+ 1 Lap	12	1
7	2	(Brazil) Rubens Barrichello	Ferrari	B	77	+ 1 Lap	5	
8	7	(Germany) Nick Heidfeld	Sauber-Petronas	B	76	+ 2 Laps	17	
9	16	(United Kingdom) Eddie Irvine	Jaguar-Cosworth	M	76	+ 2 Laps	21	
10	17	(Spain) Pedro de la Rosa	Jaguar-Cosworth	M	76	+ 2 Laps	20	
11	23	(Australia) Mark Webber	Minardi-Asiatech	M	76	+ 2 Laps	19	
12	21	(Brazil) Enrique Bernoldi	Arrows-Cosworth	B	76	+ 2 Laps	15	
Ret	24	(Finland) Mika Salo	Toyota	M	69	Brakes/Accident	9	
Ret	8	(Brazil) Felipe Massa	Sauber-Petronas	B	63	Accident	13	
Ret	12	(France) Olivier Panis	BAR-Honda	B	51	Collision	18	
Ret	15	(United Kingdom) Jenson Button	Renault	M	51	Collision	8	
Ret	6	(Colombia) Juan Pablo Montoya	Williams-BMW	M	46	Engine	1	
Ret	11	(Canada) Jacques Villeneuve	BAR-Honda	B	44	Engine	14	
Ret	4	(Finland) Kimi Räikkönen	McLaren-Mercedes	M	41	Collision damage	7	
Ret	22	(Malaysia) Alex Yoong	Minardi-Asiatech	M	29	Accident	22	
Ret	10	(Japan) Takuma Sato	Jordan-Honda	B	22	Accident	16	
Ret	25	(United Kingdom) Allan McNish	Toyota	M	15	Accident	10	

== Championship standings after the race ==
Drivers' Championship standings

+/–	Pos	Driver	Points
	1	(Germany) Michael Schumacher	60
1	2	(Germany) Ralf Schumacher	27
1	3	(Colombia) Juan Pablo Montoya	27
1	4	(United Kingdom) David Coulthard	20
1	5	(Brazil) Rubens Barrichello	12

Constructors' Championship standings

+/–	Pos	Constructor	Points
	1	(Italy) Ferrari	72
	2	(United Kingdom) Williams-BMW	54
	3	(United Kingdom) McLaren-Mercedes	24
	4	(France) Renault	11
	5	(Switzerland) Sauber-Petronas	8
Sources:

- Note: Only the top five positions are included for both sets of standings.

== Notes ==
Previous race: 2002 Austrian Grand Prix	FIA Formula One World Championship; 2002 season	Next race: 2002 Canadian Grand Prix
Previous race: 2001 Monaco Grand Prix	Monaco Grand Prix	Next race: 2003 Monaco Grand Prix
