= Rob Smedley =

British motor racing engineer (born 1973)

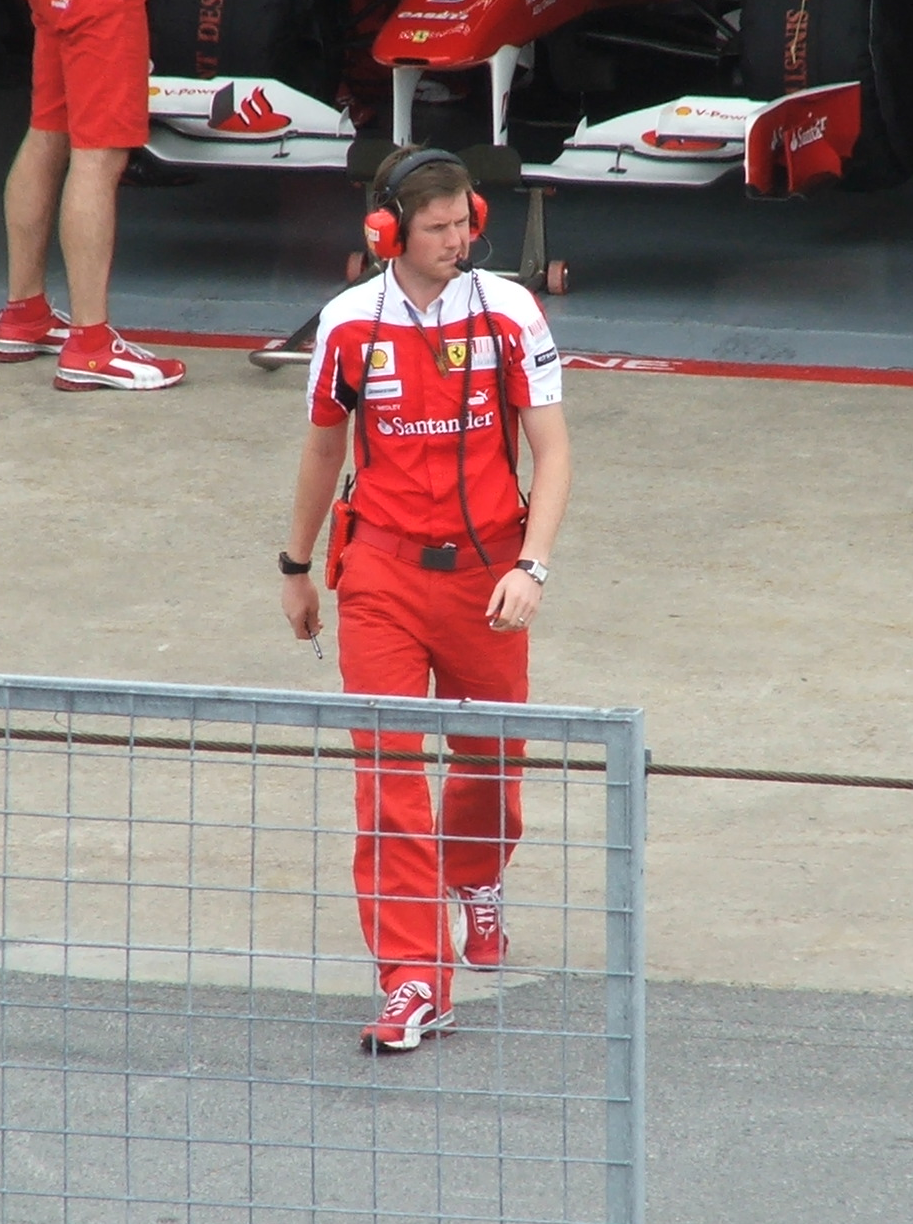
- At the 2010 Canadian Grand Prix

Personal information
- Nationality: (United Kingdom) British
- Born: Robert Michael Smedley; 28 November 1973 (age 52) Normanby, North Yorkshire, England

Sport
- Country: United Kingdom
- Sport: Formula One

Robert Michael Smedley (born 28 November 1973) is a British automotive engineer who currently works for the Formula One Group. He spent many years working within the Williams, Ferrari and Jordan Formula One teams.

== Biography ==
Smedley was born in Normanby, near Middlesbrough, and lived there until he was 18. He attended St Peter's School in South Bank and St Mary's Sixth Form College. At Loughborough University, he achieved a Bachelor of Science in Mathematics and Mechanical Engineering followed by a master's degree in Mechanical Engineering.

After leaving university, Smedley started work with Pilbeam Racing Designs, designing suspension elements used on the Peugeot 406; this car campaigned in the 1997 British Touring Car Championship. He then went on to work on Formula 3000 cars and Williams touring cars before moving to Jordan Grand Prix at the start of 1999. At Jordan, he initially worked as a data acquisition engineer, responsible for telemetry data used by the team's race engineer. For the 2002 and 2003 seasons, he became a track engineer. Before the 2004 Formula One season, he moved to Ferrari, where he initially worked in the test team.

In the middle of the 2006 season, he replaced Gabriele Delli Colli as Felipe Massa's race engineer. Massa's form improved almost immediately; his previously common errors became less frequent, and in August 2006, Massa took his first Formula One pole position and victory at the Turkish Grand Prix. During his tenure at Ferrari, Smedley was noted for his very frank and occasionally humorous radio transmissions to Massa. This included a radio at the 2009 Malaysian Grand Prix, when he was heard clearly saying "Felipe baby, stay cool," after Massa was complaining about not having a clear visor for the wet race which was being restarted.

Following Massa's injury at the 2009 Hungarian Grand Prix, Smedley carried on with the role of race engineer for stand-in drivers Luca Badoer and Giancarlo Fisichella, who took over Massa's seat for the remainder of the 2009 season. Smedley had previously worked with Fisichella at Jordan.

Smedley was involved in an incident involving team orders at the 2010 German Grand Prix in which the Ferrari team were found to have breached regulations. As Massa was in the lead of the race, Smedley contacted him by radio and said "Fernando is faster than you. Can you confirm you understood that message?" This was a thinly veiled instruction to allow Alonso to pass him and win, which Massa duly complied with. Following the pass on lap 49, Smedley added "OK mate good lad, stick with him now, sorry." After the race Ferrari were fined $100,000 for the team orders, but the result was allowed to stand.

Smedley continued as Massa's race engineer at Ferrari until 2013. He moved to Williams when Massa joined them from the 2014 season on, heading the team's trackside operations. Smedley left Williams at the end of the 2018 season, one year after Massa had left Formula One.

Smedley was awarded an honorary degree ("Doctor of Professional Studies") from Teesside University in 2009. In July 2015 he was also awarded an honorary Doctor of Technology from Loughborough University in recognition of his outstanding contribution to Formula 1 and race engineering.

In 2020, Smedley started a low-cost racing series (Total Karting, formerly named Electroheads Motorsport) using electric karts, aimed at making motorsport more accessible to beginners.

== Career summary ==
- 1997–1998: suspension engineer – Pilbeam Racing Designs
- 1999: engineer in the test team – Williams (BTCC)
- 2000: track engineer in Formula 3000
- 2001: data acquisition engineer – Jordan Grand Prix (F1)
- 2002–2003: track engineer – Jordan Grand Prix (F1)
- 2004–2005: engineer in the test team – Scuderia Ferrari (F1)
- 2006–2013: race engineer to Felipe Massa – Scuderia Ferrari (F1)
- 2014–2018: head of vehicle performance – Williams (F1)
- 2019–2020: expert technical consultant – Formula One Group
- 2020–2022: Director of Data Systems – Formula One Group
- 2020–present: Founder and Owner – Total Karting (formerly named Electroheads Motorsport)

== Personal life ==
Smedley is married to Lucy, and they have two sons. They hold fundraising events on Teesside to support the Stillbirth and Neonatal Death Society (SANDS) after the death of their daughter Minnie in 2007. They are also patrons of Zoe's Place Baby Hospice, a charity for sick babies and young children.
