= Team orders =

Motor racing teams issuing instructions to drivers

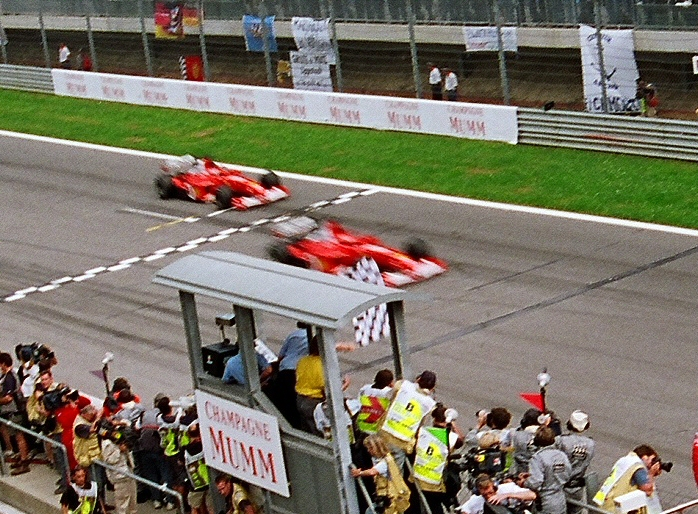
A team order at the 2002 Austrian GP. Rubens Barrichello's #2 status at Ferrari was made obvious after he moved over to let Michael Schumacher win just a few metres before the finish line.

In motor racing, team orders is the practice of teams issuing instructions to drivers to deviate from the normal practice of racing against each other as they would against other teams' drivers. This can be accomplished either in advance, simply by establishing a pecking order between the drivers within the team, or by instructing a driver to let their teammate overtake or to hold position without the risk of collision.

This is generally done when one driver is behind in a particular race but ahead overall in a championship season. The team will then order their drivers to rearrange themselves on the track so as to give more championship points to a driver who is ahead in the championship. Team orders may also be given when multiple drivers are in a position far ahead of the field, being all but assured of the win. Team orders are issued to prevent drivers from racing each other, so that they conserve fuel, reduce the likelihood of mechanical failure, and avoid a collision. Such orders have been made on countless occasions in the history of motorsport, sometimes causing great acrimony between the team and the disadvantaged driver, and controversy in the media.

Damon Hill: I'm going to put something to you here, and I think you'd better listen to this.
If we race, if we two race, we could end up with nothing, so it's up to Eddie (Jordan).
If we don't race each other, we've got an opportunity to get a first and second, it's your choice.

— Hill's radio message to the Jordan pitwall

== Team orders in Formula One ==
=== Early examples ===
Such orders were legal and accepted historically in motor racing. In the early years of the Formula One World Championship, it was even legal for a driver to give up his car during the race to the team leader if the latter's car had broken down.

In 1955, the Mercedes team asked Juan Manuel Fangio to let his teammate Stirling Moss win his home Grand Prix at Aintree. Fangio obliged, refusing to attack Moss in the closing stages of the race, and came home in second place, less than a second behind Moss.

The 1964 season saw a dramatic finale in which Lorenzo Bandini moved over for John Surtees during the Mexican Grand Prix, allowing Surtees to get the necessary points to beat Graham Hill to the World Championship.

In the 1979 German Grand Prix Clay Regazzoni was instructed by the Williams pits not to attack his teammate Alan Jones for the lead, despite Regazzoni being ahead in the championship. The status of Jones as number one driver at Williams lasted until 1981, when Carlos Reutemann deliberately ignored team orders at the 1981 Brazilian Grand Prix and did not allow him to pass. This resulted in a long feud between the two that eventually led to Jones' retirement at the end of the season, with Reutemann missing out on the World Championship by a single point.

At the 1982 French Grand Prix, René Arnoux enraged Renault by refusing to give way to his teammate Alain Prost, who at the time was ahead in the championship. However, those three points had no impact, as Prost finished fourth in the championship that year, ten points behind eventual champion Keke Rosberg. During the 1983 South African Grand Prix, the Brabham-BMW team asked driver Riccardo Patrese to cede Nelson Piquet the race win if it ensured Piquet would win the driver's championship. However, this did not prove to be necessary as Patrese won the race while Piquet came third, enough to secure him the championship. Patrese found himself in a similar situation in 1992, when he waved his Williams teammate Nigel Mansell through during the 1992 French Grand Prix, which Mansell went on to win ahead of Patrese in second.

=== Negative media reception ===
In the late 1990s, incidents of team orders began to be reported more prominently by the media, and public reaction to the more blatant examples became extremely negative. At the 1997 European Grand Prix, Jacques Villeneuve, having already clinched the title (after a controversial collision with Michael Schumacher, which Villeneuve's Williams survived), was asked by his engineer via radio to let the McLaren cars pass as "they've been very helpful", while at the 1998 Australian Grand Prix, the McLaren drivers David Coulthard and Mika Häkkinen caused a stir by switching position at the end of the race in order to respect a previous agreement. In contrast to prior examples, the 1997 Japanese Grand Prix saw a more sophisticated use of team orders, where Ferrari driver Eddie Irvine began the race light on fuel, allowing him to get ahead of the superior Williams cars and hold them up, to the benefit of teammate Michael Schumacher.

At the 1998 Belgian Grand Prix, the two Jordans of Damon Hill and Ralf Schumacher found themselves unexpectedly in the lead after a collision between Michael Schumacher and David Coulthard. Ralf was subsequently ordered not to overtake Hill, to assure Jordan of a 1-2 finish. Following this, Michael angrily bought out his brother's contract for £2 million and told Eddie Jordan that Ralf would never race for Jordan again. At the 1999 German Grand Prix, Mika Salo, driving for Ferrari in place of the injured Michael Schumacher, was leading the race when he was told to allow teammate Eddie Irvine to pass. Salo complied, giving up what would have been his only Formula One victory in 109 career races. Irvine ultimately failed to win the championship that year, losing out to Mika Häkkinen.

Barrichello said "To win, it was very, very, very good.... I got to the last corner, I didn't know what to do and nothing has been said. Michael was just very kind to, you know, let us finish equally. I guess I pointed a little bit in front, but, you know, what can we say?"
Schumacher said "The end of the race was not planned. We tried to cross the line together but failed by a tiny bit and in fact we did not know who had won until we got out of the cars. I just felt Rubens deserved to win this race."

At the 2002 Austrian Grand Prix, Rubens Barrichello was ordered to allow Ferrari teammate Michael Schumacher to pass to obtain the win. This received huge amounts of negative attention from the media, as the order was issued shortly before both drivers crossed the finish line. Both drivers were unhappy about the situation. Schumacher refused to take the top step of the podium and the centre seat, normally reserved to the winner, during the post-race press conference, and the team was punished for breach of podium procedure. At the United States Grand Prix the same year, Schumacher appeared to have returned the favour by giving Barrichello the win by the record smallest margin of 0.011 seconds on, though it is assumed Schumacher was trying to trigger a dead-heat finish.

At the 2002 French Grand Prix, the financially troubled Arrows team had failed to reach an agreement with its sponsors, thus the team ordered both its drivers, Heinz-Harald Frentzen and Enrique Bernoldi to deliberately fail to qualify by posting times slower than the 107% rule.

==== Team orders ban ====
After the 2002 season, FIA announced that "Team Orders that could influence the outcome of a race" were banned, although they were sometimes still implemented discreetly.

===== Ferrari team orders at the 2010 German Grand Prix =====
For example, this has sometimes been achieved by a team getting on the radio to the slower driver and pointing out that his teammate is quicker. The slower driver then lets the quicker driver through without the need for an overt "directive" from the team. This happened, for example, at the 2010 German Grand Prix, Felipe Massa's race engineer Rob Smedley was heard to say to his driver "Fernando is faster than you. Can you confirm you understand that message?" Moments later, Massa eased back and allowed Alonso past.

==== Crashgate ====
Perhaps the most controversial use of team orders, occurring during the period where team orders were explicitly banned, was the 2008 Singapore Grand Prix, where the Renault F1 team used team orders to instruct Nelson Piquet Jr. to crash deliberately on the fourteenth lap of the race in order to bring out the safety car, allowing his team-mate Alonso (who was proven to know nothing about the scheme) to win the race. Subsequent investigation the following year resulted in Renault receiving a two-year suspended disqualification (expired in 2011) and Flavio Briatore and Pat Symonds, two major figures involved with the team, being banned from the sport, although this was later appealed and reversed under a settlement that forbade them from working in any FIA-sanctioned events for a time.

=== Ban repealed ===
At the end of the 2010 season, the FIA conceded that the team orders rule was not working and needed to be reviewed. As of 2011, the team orders rule no longer appeared in the sporting regulations.

At the 2012 United States Grand Prix, Ferrari broke the FIA seal on the gearbox of Felipe Massa's car in order to trigger a 5-place grid penalty. This moved him behind Fernando Alonso and shifted both cars onto the "clean" side of the race track, to ensure Alonso the fastest start possible on the slippery asphalt of the brand-new Circuit of the Americas.

At the 2013 Malaysian Grand Prix, Red Bull Racing driver Sebastian Vettel was criticised for passing his team-mate Mark Webber to win the race, despite having received an order from his team to hold position.

At the 2017 Hungarian Grand Prix, the Mercedes team ordered Valtteri Bottas to yield his third position for Lewis Hamilton, who had a better chance to attack second-placed Kimi Räikkönen. When it was clear that Hamilton was not able to overcome Räikkönen, Hamilton gave back the position to Bottas in the last corner of the race, costing him three points in the Drivers' Championship. Those three points did not matter in the end, as Hamilton won the title by 46 points. At the 2018 German Grand Prix, after Vettel crashed and brought out the safety car, Hamilton inherited the lead, with team-mate Bottas behind him on fresher tyres. When the safety car period ended, Bottas initially attacked Hamilton for the lead, before being told by Mercedes' team strategist James Vowles to hold his position, handing Hamilton the win. Bottas continued to play second fiddle to Hamilton at the 2018 Russian Grand Prix, where he qualified on pole and subsequently led the race until being ordered to yield the lead to his teammate, who was ahead in the Drivers' Championship. At the 2019 Australian Grand Prix, Ferrari ordered Charles Leclerc to hold position after he attempted to overtake team-mate Vettel. Two races later, at the Chinese Grand Prix, Leclerc was ordered by Ferrari team principal Mattia Binotto to let Vettel pass him. Binotto later said the team made the "right choice" by making the call, as Vettel finished on the podium in third whilst Leclerc finished fifth.

At the 2022 Spanish Grand Prix, Red Bull ordered Sergio Pérez to give up his lead to his teammate Max Verstappen. Pérez stated that he was happy with the team but at the same time he demanded an explanation from the team regarding the orders given to him. Red Bull would again be accused of using team orders during the 2022 Azerbaijan Grand Prix with the team telling Pérez not to fight his teammate Verstappen in the main straight, however Red Bull team principal Christian Horner denied the accusation of giving team orders and Pérez defended the team decision as he experienced tyre degradation in the main straight (where Verstappen had crashed out the previous year due to a tyre failure) while some speculated the order was given to avoid another 2018 Azerbaijan Grand Prix incident (where Verstappen and then-teammate Daniel Ricciardo collided entering turn 1). Later, in the 2022 São Paulo Grand Prix, Max Verstappen controversially refused to obey team orders to let his teammate Sergio Pérez pass. With Pérez falling down the order after the second safety car restart, his Red Bull Racing teammate, Verstappen, was given permission to pass him in order to overtake Fernando Alonso's Alpine. After failing to overtake Alonso, Verstappen was told by his engineer, Gianpiero Lambiase, to give the position back to Pérez, to assist Pérez in taking second in the Drivers' Championship. Verstappen refused to comply with team orders and told Lambiase not to ask him to do such a thing again, stating that he had his "reasons" to defy such orders, and that he had discussed those reasons with the team before.

At the 2024 Hungarian Grand Prix, McLaren driver Lando Norris was ordered to give up his lead to his teammate Oscar Piastri, after the team boxed Norris first, resulting in him undercutting the then-leading Piastri. Norris initially was hesitant to give up his lead as he was looking to gain his second win in Formula One, as well as an advantage in the Drivers Championship. However, with three laps remaining, Norris gave up his race-leading position to his teammate after much convincing from his race engineer William Joseph. Norris finished second, while his teammate won his maiden Grand Prix. This decision created controversy as some believed that Piastri was handed the win by Norris and that Norris deserved to win as he was fighting for the drivers championship. Others believed that Piastri deserved the win as McLaren should have pitted Piastri first, avoiding the undercut altogether which would have most likely resulted in Piastri winning the race. McLaren would again issue team orders at the sprint race for the 2024 São Paulo Grand Prix, where Piastri qualified on pole position, and Norris qualified in second. The cars were ordered to switch positions on lap 22, and Norris went on to win the sprint race. The decision was made in an effort to gain as many points as possible against Norris' championship rival, Max Verstappen.

Team orders involving McLaren, Piastri and Norris would again be invoked again the following season at the 2025 Italian Grand Prix. Team orders were invoked in this instance because Norris, who had been the ahead of Piastri in second place, suffered a slow pit stop having allowed Piastri, who had been running in third place behind to pit first to enable to avoid being undercut by the Ferrari of Charles Leclerc. Norris had agreed to allow Piastri to pit before Norris after McLaren promised Piastri would not undercut Norris through the stops. However, a slow pit stop for Norris meant he came out behind Piastri and team orders were invoked. Piastri was left unhappy with the order but complied. The move to have Norris and Piastri swap positions was seen as particularly controversial by some fans as both Norris and Piastri were considered direct rivals competing for the 2025 drivers' championship. In the end, the team orders ended up playing a key role in the outcome of the championship, with Norris gaining 3 points thanks to them, and he ended up winning the championship by only 2 points from Max Verstappen. However, team principal Andrea Stella said the decision for team orders was due to it being Norris's own choice to pit second due to being guaranteed by the team that he would not be undercut by his teammate and that the decision made was consistent with the one made in Hungary the previous year where the roles of Norris and Piastri were reversed.

== Team orders in NASCAR ==
In NASCAR, team orders occurs not only between drivers who drive for the same team, but also between drivers who drive for teams who happen to have the same manufacturer as the other involved parties. This form of team orders is called manufacturer orders. Manufacturer orders can also be found in other motorsports. Race manipulation is officially banned in NASCAR and teams can be fined and punished by the sanctioning body if caught.

=== 2013 Federated Auto Parts 400 ===
Team orders became a serious issue during the 2013 Federated Auto Parts 400 on 7 September 2013, when an elaborate scheme involving the last race of the regular season before the Chase for the Sprint Cup erupted, causing officials to make serious rule changes. With five teams involved in the race for the final two regular and both wild card slots -- Richard Childress Racing satellite Furniture Row Racing, Hendrick Motorsports and its respective satellite Stewart–Haas Racing, Michael Waltrip Racing, and Penske Racing—for the ten-race playoff, an complicated arrangement was enacted in the waning stages of the race. Ryan Newman (Stewart-Haas) was leading the race with less than ten laps remaining, and the standings had Kurt Busch (Furniture Row) in ninth, Jeff Gordon (Hendrick) in tenth by two points, with the two wild cards being Kasey Kahne (Hendrick) and Newman, both of which would have two race wins. This would shut out Joey Logano (Penske), who was in the top ten prior to the race but struggling and now trailing Gordon by two points, and Martin Truex Jr. (Michael Waltrip), who also has one win.

Logano, down two laps, talked with fellow Ford team Front Row Motorsports driver David Gilliland about allowing Logano to pass him to gain points. With Newman leading, Logano had to be in tenth or Logano would be out of a Chase position. Truex's teammate Clint Bowyer intentionally spun and caused a caution in an effort to assist his teammate. Ensuing pit stops knocked Newman to third. Logano, who was two laps behind, did not pit and was able to advance ahead one lap as the leader must be the first car on the restart.

In order to allow the team orders for Michael Waltrip Racing to succeed, Bowyer pitted after the restart to go down laps in order to allow Logano to have one point, and teammate Brian Vickers did the same thing, and went very slow in the final lap, possibly below NASCAR's minimum speed requirement. This allowed Logano to pass Gordon, who without a win lost a tiebreaker to Logano. Logano then passed Gilliland. Truex raced hard and tied Newman, tying Newman on the first count (most wins, one), and the second count (points), winning the third count (most second-place finishes).

"NASCAR requires its competitors to race at 100 percent of their ability with the goal of achieving their best possible finishing position in an event. Any competitor who takes action with the intent to artificially alter the finishing positions of the event or encourages, persuades or induces others to artificially alter the finishing position of the event shall be subject to a penalty from NASCAR. Such penalties may include but are limited to disqualification and/or loss of finishing points and/or fines and/or loss of points and/or suspension and/or probation to any and all members of the teams, including any beneficiaries of the prohibited actions. 'Artificially altered' shall be defined as actions by any competitor that show or suggest that the competitor did not race at 100 percent of their ability for the purpose of changing finishing positions in the event at NASCAR's sole discretion."

— Section 12, Rule 4, Article L in the current NASCAR rule book

Immediately after the race, the ESPN television broadcast aired Bowyer's radio transmission in the laps leading to the safety car situation, before signing off the broadcast. This led to an immediate investigation where NASCAR uncovered via team radios the complex team orders plan, suspending Michael Waltrip Racing officials, stripping Truex of his playoff position, a $100,000 fine per car on the team, and a 50-point penalty each on all three teams (driver and owner except the #55 of Vickers, a Nationwide Series driver ineligible for Sprint Cup points, which was penalised as owner only). Probations were assessed on the Front Row and Penske teams after NASCAR uncovered the radio chatter for that team orders scheme. Gordon and Newman were each reinstated to the twelve-car playoff, which increased to thirteen after Gordon was added.

A complex series of rules were announced on 14 September 2013 by NASCAR to prevent such team orders from taking place. Among the rules to prevent team orders include different teams on the spotter's stand brokering deals in exchange for the concession of a position, private team communication that cannot be detected by officials on digital radios (teams must use analog channels that can be accessed by spectators at the circuit, audio and visual media broadcasts, and officials - in previous years some teams had scrambled signals), and a limit of one spotter per spotter's stand at the circuit. At circuits where there are multiple spotters' stands used (mainly the road courses and Talladega Superspeedway), the rule will only limit one spotter to being in each post (there are often multiple posts at road courses and Talladega because it is impossible for the entire track to be seen by one spotter). NASCAR will also mandate a video camera on the stand, which will observe radio chatter among spotters (networks may also install a camera on the spotter's stand for broadcast positioning). NASCAR also added Section 12, Rule 4, Article L in the NASCAR rule book, with the rule indirectly referencing a ban on team orders.

=== 2019 Ford EcoBoost 400 ===
Team orders would also play a role in another controversy at the season-ending 2019 Ford EcoBoost 400 on 17 November 2019 amongst smaller teams without active Race Team Alliance charters, Premium Motorsports and Rick Ware Racing; the scheme also involved a small chartered team in Spire Motorsports. The incident occurred as Premium Motorsports' No. 27 car (driven by Ross Chastain for the race) raced for the top-placed non-chartered team against Gaunt Brothers Racing's No. 96 (driven by Drew Herring); the top-placed non-chartered team (referred as Open teams by NASCAR) in the owner's points standings would earn higher bonuses. NASCAR's investigation, which involved access to team radio channels, was published on 27 November 2019, which revealed that the Nos. 27, 52 (Rick Ware Racing, driven by Josh Bilicki), 77 (Spire Motorsports, driven by Reed Sorenson) and 15 (Premium Motorsports, driven by Joe Nemechek) were found to have manipulated the outcome of the race, by means of inter-team exchanges asking the latter three cars to park (retire) out of the race within a 15-lap span for the benefit of No. 27 in the point standings.

NASCAR subsequently fined crew members Scott Egglestone (Premium Motorsports) and Kenneth Evans (Rick Ware Racing) $25,000 each and suspended both indefinitely. All three team owners were fined $50,000, and all four cars were assessed a fifty-point penalty. Spire Motorsports did not appeal their penalties, while Premium and RWR remained quiet on the incident. Sorenson, who initially repeatedly refused to pit in according to radio communications, was the only driver to have points deducted from driver's point standings, as none of the other drivers were eligible to score points in the Cup series whilst mainly participating in lower NASCAR touring series; thus, the penalties primarily affected owner's point standings.

=== 2020 Xfinity 500 ===
After the penultimate playoff race before the Championship 4 race, the 2020 Xfinity 500, Joe Gibbs Racing was subject of an investigation following a team order message directed to Erik Jones asking him not to pass Denny Hamlin in order to help Hamlin, who had been struggling during the late phases of the race, to advance to the Championship 4 race. NASCAR ultimately did not issue penalties for Jones' or Hamlin's team, and Hamlin ultimately advanced to the Championship 4 race, where he lost the championship to Chase Elliott.

=== 2022 Bank of America Roval 400 ===
At the end of 2022 Bank of America Roval 400, Cole Custer's last lap behavior, in which he slowed down into the backstretch heading into the last chicane in order to allow Chase Briscoe to pass several drivers and thus increase his points gap over Kyle Larson (who suffered from a suspension damage from a wall contact), was subject of an investigation by NASCAR, although the organization assured that the Round of 8 grid would not change as a result of the investigation. On October 11, NASCAR docked Custer 50 driver and owner points, suspended Custer's crew chief Mike Shiplett (who notified, instead of Custer's spotter, that he had a supposed flat tire) indefinitely, and fined both $100,000 each, on race manipulation charges, based on the "fullest ability" clause added after the 2013 Richmond incident. On October 27, Stewart–Haas Racing lost the appeal against Custer's penalties.

== Team orders in MotoGP ==
While not commonly used, team orders in MotoGP have gained some notoriety for last few seasons. In 2017, Ducati sent Jorge Lorenzo team orders on his dashboard and pitboards during the last 2 races of the season, to either stay behind his team-mate Andrea Dovizioso, or let him pass. Lorenzo claimed to have not seen them in Malaysia, and chose to ignore them in Valencia. During the 2020 season, Suzuki was said to be playing team orders with their riders in order for Joan Mir to secure the 2020 championship.

In 2022 season, Ducati was accused by rival teams of playing team orders to manipulate the championship during the San Marino, Malaysia and Valencia rounds of the season. However, team manager Davide Tardozzi denied using team orders in order to secure Francesco Bagnaia the championship and told the media that riders are free to race each other. Examples exist in earlier times. For instance, during the 1968 season finale. Yamaha riders Phil Read and Bill Ivy were contenders for 250cc title. Read had taken the 125cc title the race before, and Yamaha had decided before the start of the season that Read would have to let Ivy take the 250cc title. Read disrespected the agreement, won the final 250cc race at Monza in front of Ivy, and was awarded the 250cc world championship.

== Team orders in other motorsports ==
The Rallye Sanremo in the 1976 World Rally Championship marked a rivalry between Lancia drivers, Björn Waldegård and Sandro Munari. Ahead of the last stage, Waldegård was in lead, four seconds ahead of Munari. To give Munari an equal chance at winning, Lancia team boss Cesare Fiorio ordered Waldegård to wait for another four seconds in the start. Waldegård followed the orders, but in the end, still won the rally overall by four seconds ahead of Munari. He then left the Lancia team for Ford. The season finale of the 2021 Deutsche Tourenwagen Masters was noted for presence of manufacturer orders between several Mercedes-AMG teams in order to ensure Maximilian Götz would be the DTM champion that year, taking advantage of the first-corner collision between Kelvin van der Linde and Liam Lawson.
