= Gabriele Delli Colli =

- Born: 19 October 1966 (age 59); Sesto San Giovanni, Italy
- Citizenship: Italian
- Occupation: Engineer
- Employer: Audi Sport GmbH
- Title: Head of simulation

Gabriele Delli Colli (born 19 October 1966) is an Italian Formula One and motorsport engineer. He is currently working on simulation projects with Audi Sport GmbH. He previously as a race engineer at Minardi, Sauber Motorsport, Jordan Grand Prix and Scuderia Ferrari in Formula One.

== Career ==
Delli Colli studied mechanical engineering at the Politecnico di Milano, specialising in vehicle dynamics, graduating in 1992. He began his professional career in automotive research and suspension development, working with Centro Ricerche Fiat on suspension kinematics, multi-body simulation and CAD-based vehicle analysis. Alongside this, he collaborated with Ermolli Corse on the design and development of junior single-seater cars, including Formula Alfa Boxer and Formula Renault projects.

In the mid-1990s, Delli Colli moved into motorsport engineering with Alfa Corse, working as a race and vehicle engineer on touring car programmes. He served as race engineer to Alessandro Nannini in the DTM championship in 1995 and 1996, while also leading damper development and vehicle dynamics analysis. In 1997, he made the move to Formula One with Minardi, engineering Tarso Marques and later Jarno Trulli. He then joined Sauber Motorsport, working with Jean Alesi during the 1998 and 1999 seasons before engineering Pedro Diniz in 2000.

In 2001, Delli Colli joined Jordan Grand Prix as a senior race engineer, working with Jarno Trulli. The following season he moved to Scuderia Ferrari, where he became a race engineer on the Formula One team. From 2002 to 2005, he served as race engineer to Rubens Barrichello, and in early 2006 worked with Felipe Massa at the start of the season. He subsequently transitioned to Ferrari’s test and development operations, contributing to R&D projects including the rear suspension system and seamless shift gearbox.

From 2007, Delli Colli took on a senior role within Ferrari’s simulation and development structure, becoming Team Leader of the Driver-in-the-Loop Simulator group. In this position, he oversaw the development of Ferrari's first simulator programme. In 2013, following the conclusion of his tenure at Ferrari, Delli Colli joined Audi Sport, where he continues to serve as Driver-in-the-Loop Simulator Team Leader. His work has focused on simulator development, vehicle dynamics correlation and performance support across Audi’s motorsport programmes.
