= Renault R202 =

Formula One racing car

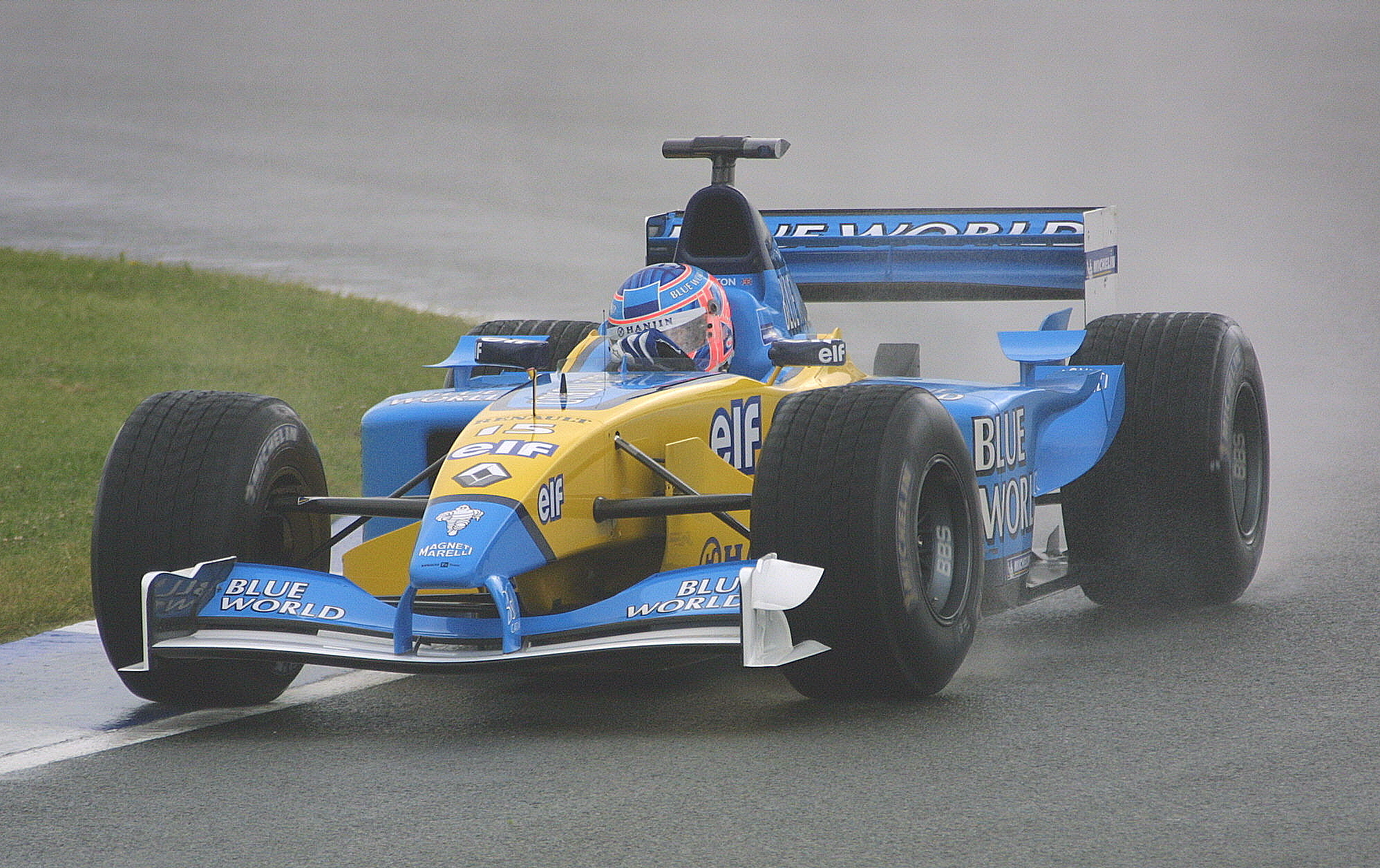
- Jenson Button driving the R202 at the 2002 British Grand Prix
- Category: Formula One
- Constructor: Renault
- Designers: Pat Symonds (Executive Engineer); Mike Gascoyne (Technical Director); Bob Bell (Deputy Technical Director); Mark Smith (Chief Designer); Tad Czapski (Head of R&D); John Iley (Head of Aerodynamics); Jean Jacques His (Engine Technical Director); Jean-Philippe Mercier (Project Manager - Engine)
- Predecessor: Benetton B201 - Benetton Engineering; Renault RE60 - Renault branded
- Successor: Renault R23

Technical specifications
- Chassis: Moulded carbon-fibre and aluminium honeycomb composite monocoque
- Suspension (front): Carbon-fibre top and bottom wishbones operate an inboard titanium rocker via a pushrod system
- Suspension (rear): Carbon-fibre top and bottom wishbones operate an inboard titanium rocker via a pushrod system
- Engine: Renault RS22, Mid-mounted 3.0 litre V10 (111°)
- Transmission: Titanium longitudinal, semi-automatic sequential paddle-shift, 6 speed + 1 reverse
- Power: 820 hp @ 17,500 rpm
- Fuel: Elf
- Tyres: Michelin

Competition history
- Notable entrants: Mild Seven Renault F1 Team
- Notable drivers: 14. (Italy) Jarno Trulli; 15. (United Kingdom) Jenson Button
- Debut: 2002 Australian Grand Prix
- Last event: 2002 Japanese Grand Prix
Races	Wins	Poles	F/Laps
17	0	0	0
- Constructors' Championships: 0
- Drivers' Championships: 0

The Renault R202 was the car with which the Renault team competed in the 2002 Formula One World Championship. It was the first Renault Formula One car following the French manufacturer's rebranding of the Benetton team. The car was driven by Briton Jenson Button, who was retained from 2001, and Italian Jarno Trulli, who joined the team from Jordan. The test driver was Spaniard Fernando Alonso, who signed from Minardi.

Keeping the tradition of the chassis naming by Benetton, Renault named the car R202.

== Overview ==
=== Launching ===
The R202 was Renault's official return to Formula One as a chassis maker and full team for 2002. The R202 was launched in Paris, France on 27 January 2002. Benetton, the team they had purchased, were fully rebranded into the Renault family with the car featuring prominent yellow streaks against pale blue. The blue for returning lead sponsor, Mild Seven, except at the British and French Grands Prix. In countries where advertising of tobacco products was not allowed, the Mild Seven text was replaced with "Blue World".

=== Chassis ===
The chassis was designed by Mike Gascoyne with support from Bob Bell, Tim Densham, John Iley and Pat Symonds. The R202 was an aerodynamic development of the 2001 car, building on the gains made from their extensive wind tunnel testing. The R202 featured Renault's RS22 V10 engine, featuring a unique 111° degree cylinder bank angle featuring a lower centre of gravity than any other F1 engine at the time. The RS22 engine powering the R202 had an output of 825 hp at 17,500rpm. The R202 utilised Michelin tyres, an agreement reached prior to the French companies return to F1 in 2001.

=== Testing ===
The R202 was formally tested ahead of the Australian Grand Prix at Silverstone by race team drivers Trulli and Button. Chassis 1, 2 and 3 were all utilised ahead of the first race. Reserve driver, Fernando Alonso continued testing parts for the R202 at Silverstone into March.

=== Racing history ===
The season started poorly for Renault in Australia. Both Button and Trulli were eliminated due to collisions, and by Lap 9 had no runners in the field. Trulli retired from the next two Grand Prix, whilst Button finished in fourth place in both Grand Prix, scoring valuable points, and again in San Marino achieving fifth place. At the Spanish round, both Button and Trulli retired from the race but were classified due to completing more than 90% of race distance. Button was heading for a career first podium finish. A further retirement in Austria meant that Trulli had only crossed the finish line in one Grand Prix driving the R202.

At Monaco, Trulli's fortunes turned and the R202 scored a fourth-place finish, and at the next race in Canada scoring a point for sixth place. However, he would retire from a further five Grand Prix driving the R202 including Renault's home race at France where Button secured a point for finishing in sixth.

Trulli and Button took the R202 to its only double points finish at the 2002 Italian Grand Prix in Monza despite both having qualified outside the top ten.

Despite the reliability challenges, the R202 took Renault to fourth place in the World Constructors Championship standings at the end of the season with 23 points. Button scoring 14, and Trulli 9 the pair finishing seventh and eighth in the drivers standings but scored no podiums for the first time since 1985 season when it was named Toleman.

The R202 would be Button's final season driving for Renault in his Formula One career. He departed for British American Racing.

== Complete Formula One results ==
(key) (Results in bold indicate pole position; results in italics indicate fastest lap)

Year	Entrant	Engine	Tyres	Drivers	1	2	3	4	5	6	7	8	9	10	11	12	13	14	15	16	17	Pts.	WCC
2002	Mild Seven Renault F1 Team	Renault RS22 V10	**M**		AUS	MAL	BRA	SMR	ESP	AUT	MON	CAN	EUR	GBR	FRA	GER	HUN	BEL	ITA	USA	JPN	**23**	**4th**
2002	Mild Seven Renault F1 Team	Renault RS22 V10	**M**	(Italy) Jarno Trulli	Ret	Ret	Ret	9	10^{†}	Ret	4	6	8	Ret	Ret	Ret	8	Ret	4	5	Ret	**23**	**4th**
2002	Mild Seven Renault F1 Team	Renault RS22 V10	**M**	(United Kingdom) Jenson Button	Ret	4	4	5	12^{†}	7	Ret	15^{†}	5	12^{†}	6	Ret	Ret	Ret	5	8	6	**23**	**4th**
