= 2002 Formula One World Championship =

56th season of FIA Formula One motor racing

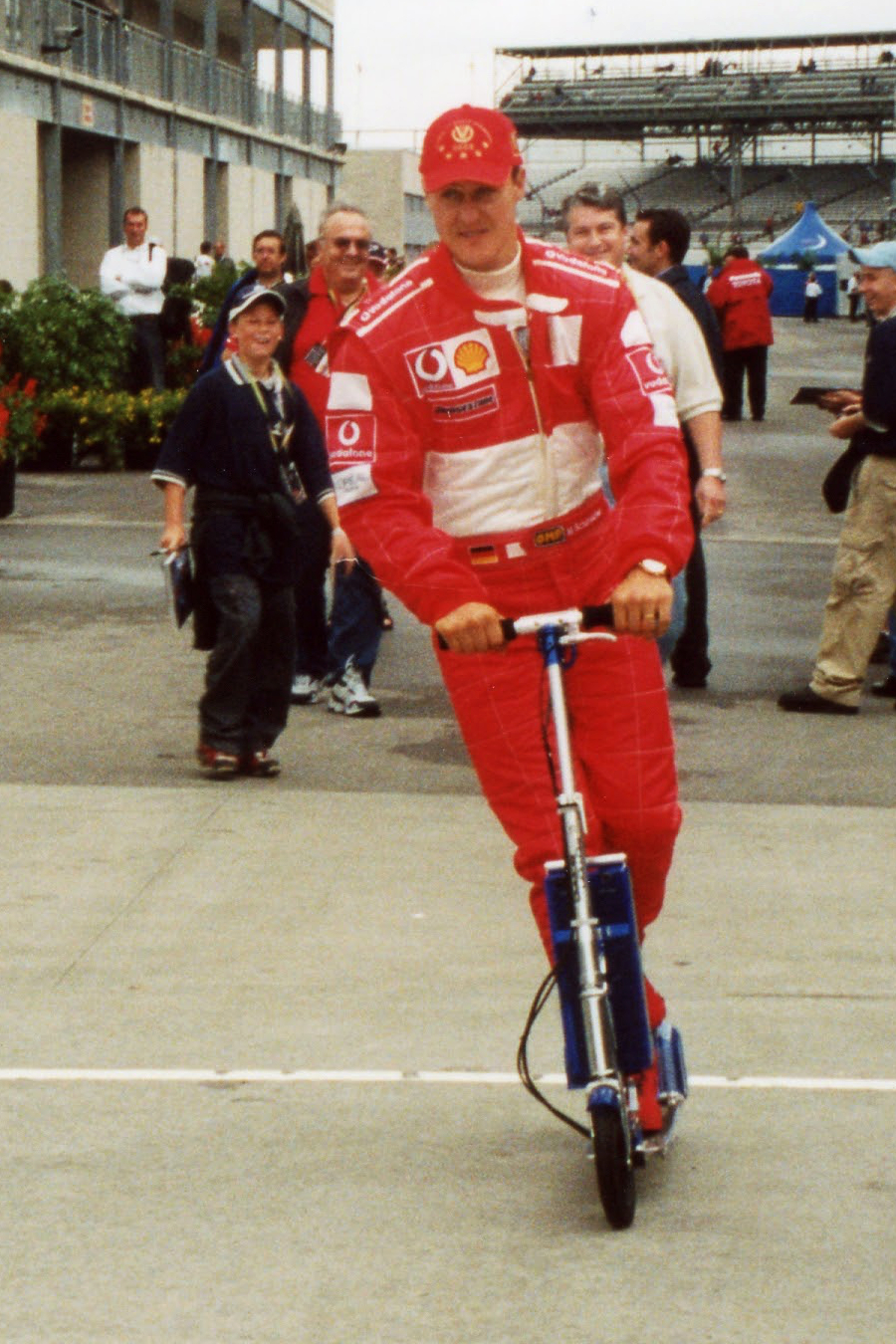
Michael Schumacher won a then record equaling fifth title and it was his third title in a row with Ferrari, setting the record of finishing on the podium in every race.

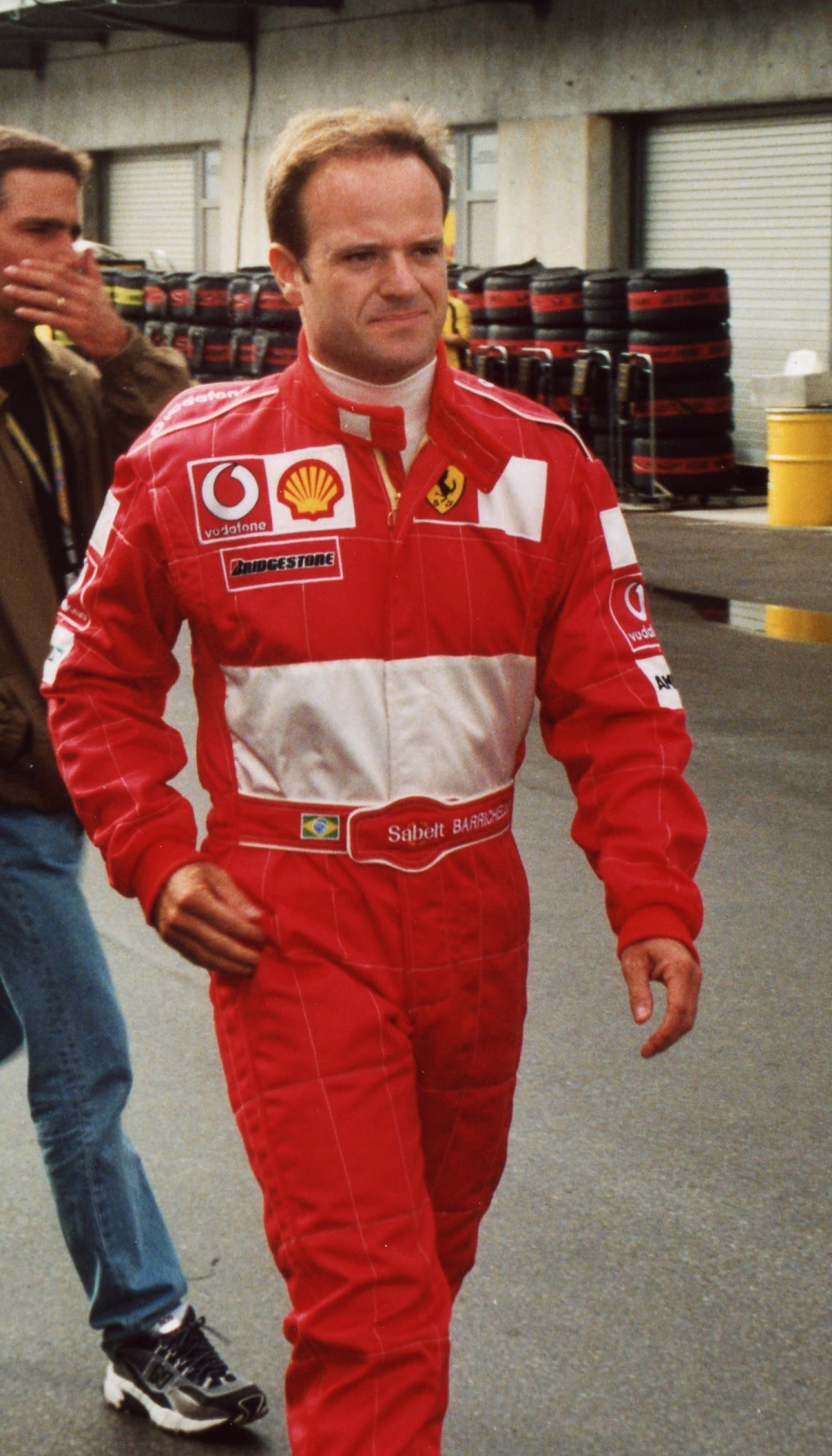
Schumacher's Ferrari teammate Rubens Barrichello finished runner-up with 77 points.

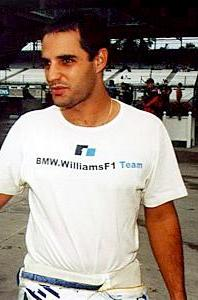
Juan Pablo Montoya finished third for Williams with 50 points.

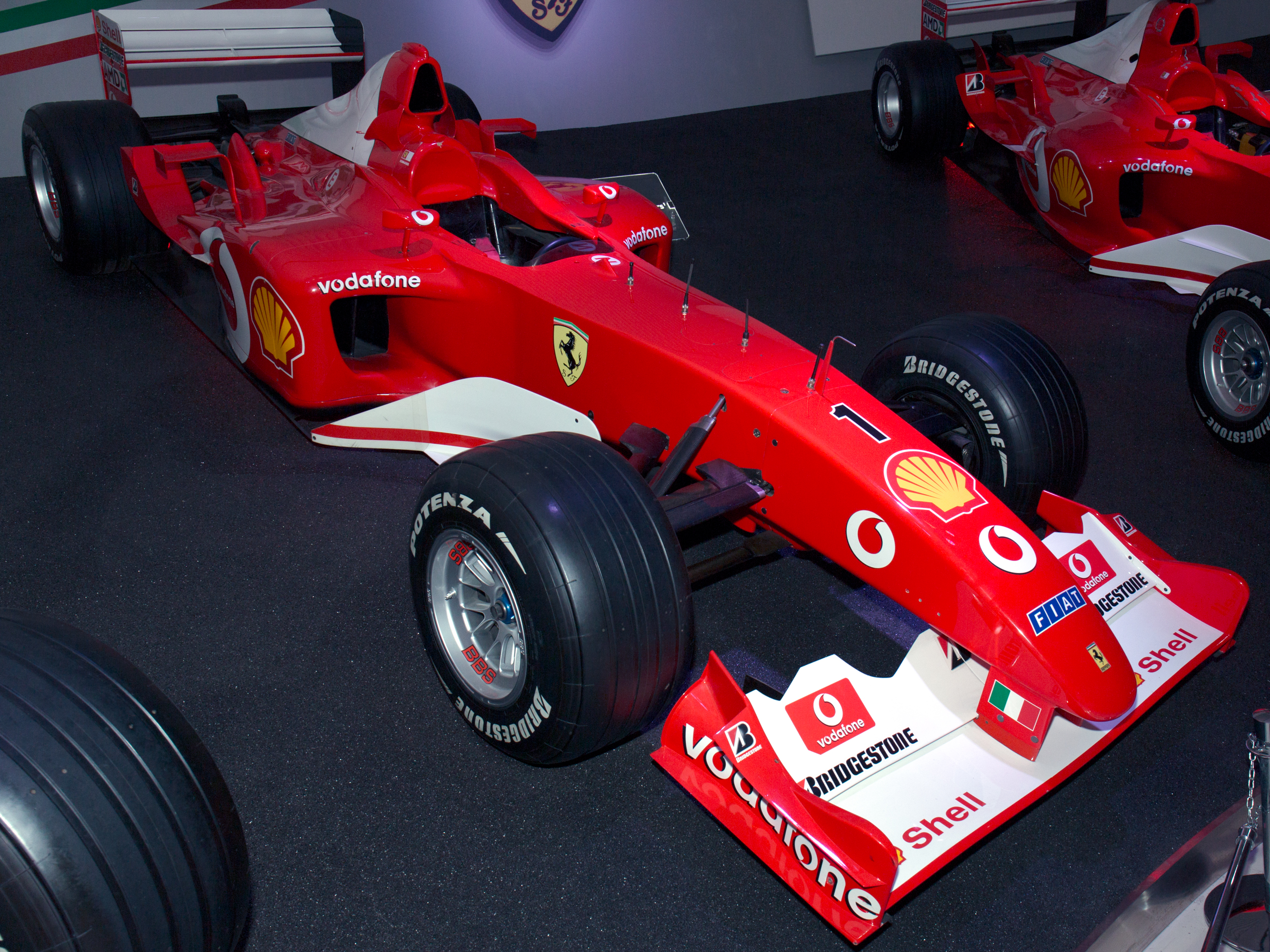
Scuderia Ferrari won the Constructors' Championship for a record extending twelfth time.

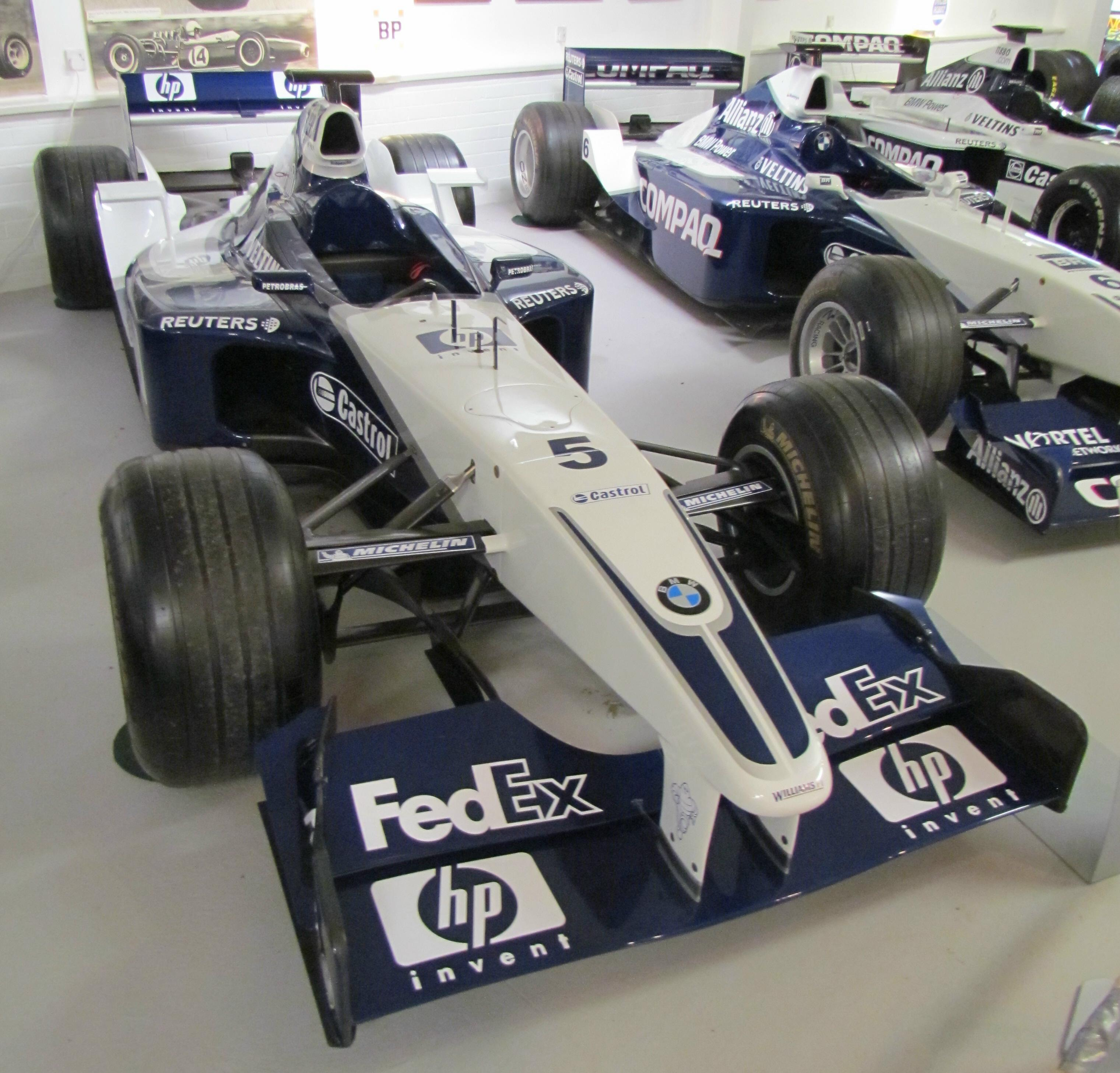
BMW Williams placed second.

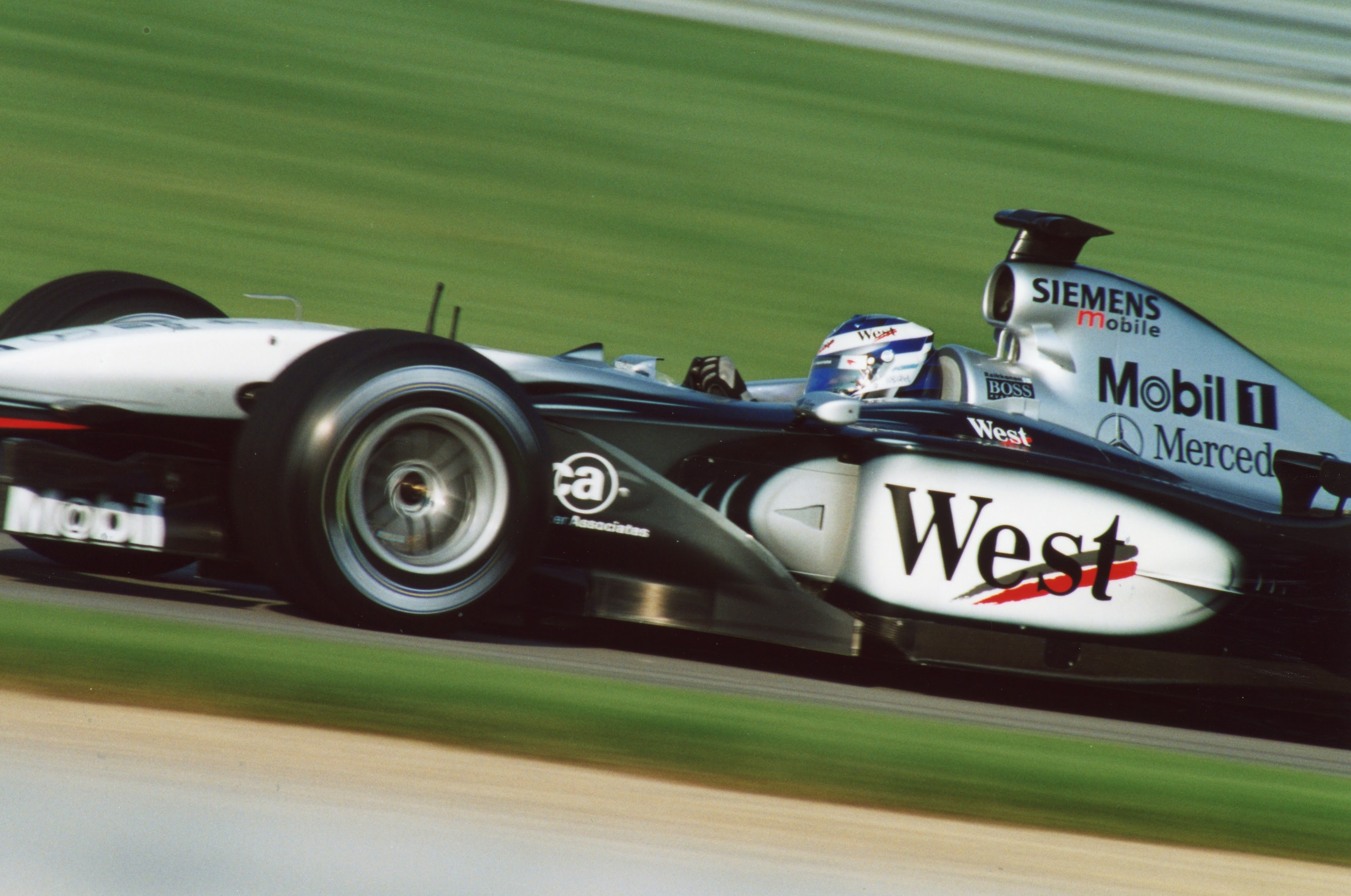
McLaren-Mercedes finished third.

The 2002 FIA Formula One World Championship was the 56th season of FIA Formula One motor racing. It featured the 2002 Formula One World Championship for Drivers and the 2002 Formula One World Championship for Constructors, which were contested concurrently over a seventeen-race series that commenced on 3 March and ended on 13 October.

Defending champions Michael Schumacher and Scuderia Ferrari were again awarded the World Drivers' Championship and World Constructors' Championship, respectively. Schumacher finished first or second in every race except for the Malaysian Grand Prix, where he finished third, thus becoming the only driver so far to achieve a podium position in every race of a season. He won a then-record eleven Grands Prix, surpassing the previous record of nine wins, jointly held by himself (1995, 2000 and 2001) and Nigel Mansell (1992). He also set the record for the largest number of races remaining on the calendar when the Drivers' Championship was clinched, securing the title with six races to go in the season.

Schumacher took the trophy home by a then-record 67-point margin over teammate Rubens Barrichello, beating his own record from the previous year (58 points over David Coulthard) and also collected the highest points total in a season thus far (144 points), again beating his own record (123 points in 2001). With their two drivers, Ferrari secured the Constructors' Championship with a points total that equalled the combined sum of points attained by all other constructors collectively. This domination, coupled with a resulting decline in viewing figures, resulted in a major overhaul of the championship's sporting regulations for the following season. This season marked the debut of future Grand Prix winners, Felipe Massa and Mark Webber. As of 2026, this is the latest season without any active drivers.

== Teams and drivers ==
The following teams and drivers competed in the 2002 FIA Formula One World Championship.

Entrant	Constructor	Chassis	Engine^{†}	Tyre	No.	Driver	Rounds
(Italy) Scuderia Ferrari Marlboro	Ferrari	F2001B; F2002	Ferrari Tipo 050; Ferrari Tipo 051	B	1	(Germany) Michael Schumacher	All
(Italy) Scuderia Ferrari Marlboro	Ferrari	F2001B; F2002	Ferrari Tipo 050; Ferrari Tipo 051	B	2	(Brazil) Rubens Barrichello	All
(United Kingdom) West McLaren Mercedes	McLaren-Mercedes	MP4-17	Mercedes FO110M	M	3	(United Kingdom) David Coulthard	All
(United Kingdom) West McLaren Mercedes	McLaren-Mercedes	MP4-17	Mercedes FO110M	M	4	(Finland) Kimi Räikkönen	All
(United Kingdom) BMW WilliamsF1 Team	Williams-BMW	FW24	BMW P82	M	5	(Germany) Ralf Schumacher	All
(United Kingdom) BMW WilliamsF1 Team	Williams-BMW	FW24	BMW P82	M	6	(Colombia) Juan Pablo Montoya	All
(Switzerland) Sauber Petronas	Sauber-Petronas	C21	Petronas 02A	B	7	(Germany) Nick Heidfeld	All
(Switzerland) Sauber Petronas	Sauber-Petronas	C21	Petronas 02A	B	8	(Brazil) Felipe Massa	1–15, 17
(Switzerland) Sauber Petronas	Sauber-Petronas	C21	Petronas 02A	B	8	(Germany) Heinz-Harald Frentzen	16
(Republic of Ireland) DHL Jordan Honda	Jordan-Honda	EJ12	Honda RA002E	B	9	(Italy) Giancarlo Fisichella	All
(Republic of Ireland) DHL Jordan Honda	Jordan-Honda	EJ12	Honda RA002E	B	10	(Japan) Takuma Sato	All
(United Kingdom) Lucky Strike BAR Honda	BAR-Honda	004	Honda RA002E	B	11	(Canada) Jacques Villeneuve	All
(United Kingdom) Lucky Strike BAR Honda	BAR-Honda	004	Honda RA002E	B	12	(France) Olivier Panis	All
(France) Mild Seven Renault F1 Team	Renault	R202	Renault RS22	M	14	(Italy) Jarno Trulli	All
(France) Mild Seven Renault F1 Team	Renault	R202	Renault RS22	M	15	(United Kingdom) Jenson Button	All
(United Kingdom) HSBC Jaguar Racing F1 Team	Jaguar-Cosworth	R3; R3B	Cosworth CR-3; Cosworth CR-4	M	16	(United Kingdom) Eddie Irvine	All
(United Kingdom) HSBC Jaguar Racing F1 Team	Jaguar-Cosworth	R3; R3B	Cosworth CR-3; Cosworth CR-4	M	17	(Spain) Pedro de la Rosa	All
(United Kingdom) Orange Arrows	Arrows-Cosworth	A23	Cosworth CR-3	B	20	(Germany) Heinz-Harald Frentzen	1–12
(United Kingdom) Orange Arrows	Arrows-Cosworth	A23	Cosworth CR-3	B	21	(Brazil) Enrique Bernoldi	1–12
(Italy) KL Minardi Asiatech	Minardi-Asiatech	PS02	Asiatech AT02	M	22	(Malaysia) Alex Yoong	1–12, 15–17
(Italy) KL Minardi Asiatech	Minardi-Asiatech	PS02	Asiatech AT02	M	22	(United Kingdom) Anthony Davidson	13–14
(Italy) KL Minardi Asiatech	Minardi-Asiatech	PS02	Asiatech AT02	M	23	(Australia) Mark Webber	All
(Japan) Panasonic Toyota Racing	Toyota	TF102	Toyota RVX-02	M	24	(Finland) Mika Salo	All
(Japan) Panasonic Toyota Racing	Toyota	TF102	Toyota RVX-02	M	25	(United Kingdom) Allan McNish	All

^{†} All engines were 3.0 litre, V10 configuration.

=== Team changes ===
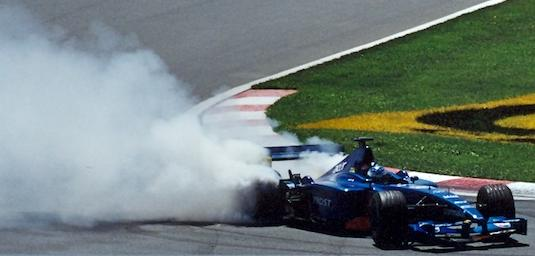
Prost Grand Prix left F1 before the 2002 season.

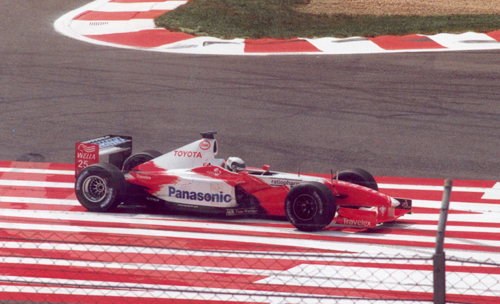
Toyota joined F1 as a full works team.

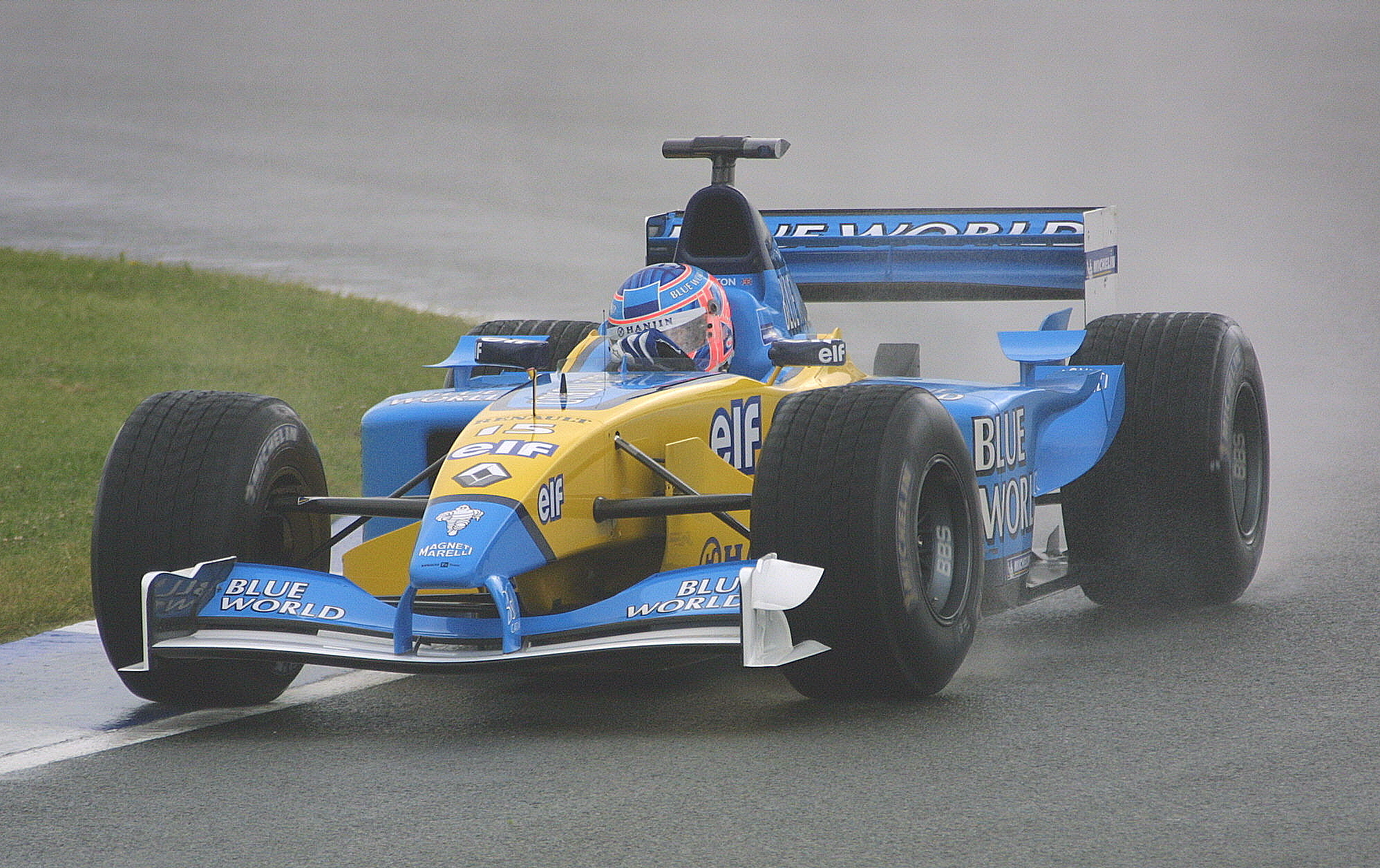
Benetton was rebranded as Renault, the name of its new owner.

- The Prost team was placed into receivership in November 2001, and was liquidated by the receivers in January 2002. This ended the long history of the team which had competed as Ligier from 1976 to 1996 and as Prost Grand Prix from the following year. The absence of Prost meant that the car numbers 18 and 19 were left unoccupied for the season. Phoenix Finance bought the remains of Prost Grand Prix and attempted to enter Formula One starting at the Malaysian Grand Prix with former Minardi drivers Gastón Mazzacane and Tarso Marques. However, their entry was rejected by the FIA for not purchasing all of the Prost team. They still attempted to race at Malaysia, but race officials prevented them from competing in the event, even with a court appeal.
- Japanese auto maker Toyota entered the championship as a full works team, after much development work in 2001.
- The Benetton team had been sold to Renault in 2000, and was renamed Renault F1 for 2002. The team did not substantially change apart from the name, as Benetton had been running a car with Renault engines since 1995, these engines being badged as Playlife from 1998 to 2000 after Renault had previously ended official involvement in F1 following the end of the 1997 season.
- Asiatech, who had supplied engines to Arrows in 2001, switched their supply to Minardi for 2002. This replaced Minardi's Cosworth engines (rebadged as European) from the previous season. Completing what was effectively a straight swap, Arrows signed a deal with Cosworth to use their engines for 2002.

==== Mid-season changes ====
- The Arrows team suffered financial collapse after the German Grand Prix, and did not take part in any of the remaining races. An attempt to register for the 2003 season was rejected by the FIA.

=== Driver changes ===
The 2002 season featured several driver line-up changes before the season and more changes during the season proper.

- With three races left to go in the 2001 season, 1998 and 1999 World Champion Mika Häkkinen announced that he was not intending to drive in F1 in 2002. Denying any claim of retirement, he stated that he needed a sabbatical and would return to McLaren at a later time. Häkkinen later officially left McLaren and retired from F1 at the end of 2001, eventually returning to racing in DTM in 2005, despite being linked with the Williams team for a Formula One comeback. Häkkinen's seat at McLaren was taken by his fellow Finn Kimi Räikkönen, after he was released by Sauber. Räikkönen was replaced at Sauber by the 2001 Euro Formula 3000 champion Felipe Massa.
- Midway through 2001, Giancarlo Fisichella announced his intention to leave Benetton after 2001 to drive for Jordan. Benetton, renamed as Renault, replaced Fisichella with Jordan driver Jarno Trulli, meaning that Fisichella and Trulli had swapped seats at the two teams. Jordan completed an all-new lineup for 2002 with BAR test driver Takuma Sato, whose position in the large test driver pool at BAR was taken by compatriot Ryo Fukuda. Jean Alesi, who had driven for Jordan at the end of the 2001 season, did not seriously pursue an F1 drive for 2002 and instead signed up a drive with Mercedes in the DTM series. Ricardo Zonta, realising that he had no future at Jordan, left his reserve seat there to drive in the Telefonica World Series, later returning to F1 in 2003 as a test driver for Toyota.
- Heinz-Harald Frentzen, without a drive after the collapse of Prost, joined the Arrows team for 2002. This was his third different team within two seasons, after having been dumped by Jordan mid-season in 2001 and subsequently joining Prost until that team's collapse. Despite being under contract for another season, Jos Verstappen lost his Arrows seat to Frentzen, and the Dutchman was unable to secure a drive at another team. He later resurfaced at Minardi in 2003.
- Fernando Alonso left Minardi after an impressive 2001 campaign, and signed on with Renault as a test driver. Alonso's seat was taken over by Benetton test driver, and International Formula 3000 series runner-up, Mark Webber.
- For their first season in Formula One, Toyota employed Mika Salo (formerly with Sauber in 2000) and debutant Allan McNish, who had previously driven a Toyota GT-One at Le Mans.
- Luciano Burti, who had driven for both Jaguar and Prost in 2001, left the struggling Prost team before their collapse in order to join Luca Badoer in a test role at Ferrari. Tomáš Enge, who had filled in for the injured Burti at Prost in 2001, was dropped by the team at the end of the 2001 season for financial reasons, and he returned to International Formula 3000 for 2002.
- Antônio Pizzonia was signed to become a Williams test driver alongside Marc Gené. Pizzonia had been driving a Williams sponsored car in the International F3000 series in 2001, and he continued that drive in 2002 along with his test duties at Williams.
- André Lotterer, who drove for the Jaguar Junior Team in the British Formula 3 series in 2001, was signed as a test driver for Jaguar's Formula One team for 2002.

==== Mid-season changes ====
- Heinz-Harald Frentzen decided to leave Arrows following the German Grand Prix due to the uncertain future of that team. Arrows collapsed several days later and did not take part in the rest of the season, which also left Enrique Bernoldi without a drive. Frentzen signed with Sauber for the 2003 season, and stood in for Felipe Massa in the United States Grand Prix, for which the Brazilian had incurred a 10-position penalty from the previous race in Monza, thereby eliminating Massa's penalty.
- BAR test driver Anthony Davidson made his Formula One debut when he replaced Alex Yoong at Minardi for the Hungarian and Belgian Grands Prix. The team suspended the Malaysian after he failed to qualify for the third occasion in 2002. Minardi had planned to replace Yoong with Justin Wilson, but Wilson was too tall to fit into the car in accordance with the safety requirements.

== Regulation changes ==
For 2002, there were only minor changes in the technical regulations.

- For safety reasons, the rear view mirrors and rear lights had to be made larger and the rear crash structure was subjected to increased impact tests.
- Data transfer between the car on track and the crew in the garage could now occur both ways. This would allow the team to adjust settings in the car's electronics during the race, without the driver having to use the buttons on his steering wheel.

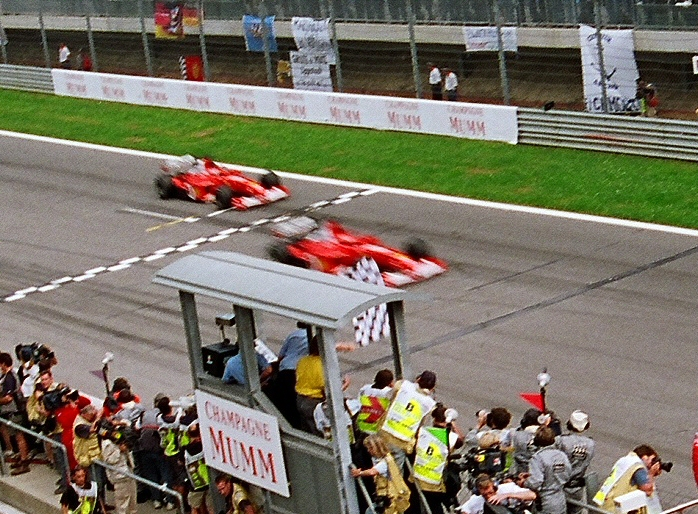
The finish of the 2002 Austrian Grand Prix

== Calendar ==
The 2002 calendar featured the same seventeen Grands Prix as the previous season.

Round	Grand Prix	Circuit	Date
1	Australian Grand Prix	(Australia) Albert Park Circuit, Melbourne	3 March
2	Malaysian Grand Prix	(Malaysia) Sepang International Circuit, Kuala Lumpur	17 March
3	Brazilian Grand Prix	(Brazil) Autódromo José Carlos Pace, São Paulo	31 March
4	San Marino Grand Prix	(Italy) Autodromo Enzo e Dino Ferrari, Imola	14 April
5	Spanish Grand Prix	(Spain) Circuit de Catalunya, Montmeló	28 April
6	Austrian Grand Prix	(Austria) A1-Ring, Spielberg	12 May
7	Monaco Grand Prix	Circuit de Monaco, Monte Carlo	26 May
8	Canadian Grand Prix	(Canada) Circuit Gilles Villeneuve, Montreal	9 June
9	European Grand Prix	(Germany) Nürburgring, Nürburg	23 June
10	British Grand Prix	(United Kingdom) Silverstone Circuit, Silverstone	7 July
11	French Grand Prix	(France) Circuit de Nevers Magny-Cours, Magny-Cours	21 July
12	German Grand Prix	(Germany) Hockenheimring, Hockenheim	28 July
13	Hungarian Grand Prix	(Hungary) Hungaroring, Mogyoród	18 August
14	Belgian Grand Prix	(Belgium) Circuit de Spa-Francorchamps, Stavelot	1 September
15	Italian Grand Prix	(Italy) Autodromo Nazionale di Monza, Monza	15 September
16	United States Grand Prix	(United States) Indianapolis Motor Speedway, Speedway	29 September
17	Japanese Grand Prix	(Japan) Suzuka Circuit, Suzuka	13 October

=== Calendar changes ===
- The French Grand Prix swapped places with the British Grand Prix to avoid a scheduling conflict with the 2002 FIFA World Cup finals in Japan and South Korea.

== Results and standings ==
=== Grands Prix ===
Round	Grand Prix	Pole position	Fastest lap	Winning driver	Winning constructor	Report
1	(Australia) Australian Grand Prix	(Brazil) Rubens Barrichello	(Finland) Kimi Räikkönen	(Germany) Michael Schumacher	(Italy) Ferrari	Report
2	(Malaysia) Malaysian Grand Prix	(Germany) Michael Schumacher	(Colombia) Juan Pablo Montoya	(Germany) Ralf Schumacher	(United Kingdom) Williams-BMW	Report
3	(Brazil) Brazilian Grand Prix	(Colombia) Juan Pablo Montoya	(Colombia) Juan Pablo Montoya	(Germany) Michael Schumacher	(Italy) Ferrari	Report
4	(Italy) San Marino Grand Prix	(Germany) Michael Schumacher	(Brazil) Rubens Barrichello	(Germany) Michael Schumacher	(Italy) Ferrari	Report
5	(Spain) Spanish Grand Prix	(Germany) Michael Schumacher	(Germany) Michael Schumacher	(Germany) Michael Schumacher	(Italy) Ferrari	Report
6	(Austria) Austrian Grand Prix	(Brazil) Rubens Barrichello	(Germany) Michael Schumacher	(Germany) Michael Schumacher	(Italy) Ferrari	Report
7	Monaco Grand Prix	(Colombia) Juan Pablo Montoya	(Brazil) Rubens Barrichello	(United Kingdom) David Coulthard	(United Kingdom) McLaren-Mercedes	Report
8	(Canada) Canadian Grand Prix	(Colombia) Juan Pablo Montoya	(Colombia) Juan Pablo Montoya	(Germany) Michael Schumacher	(Italy) Ferrari	Report
9	(Germany) European Grand Prix	(Colombia) Juan Pablo Montoya	(Germany) Michael Schumacher	(Brazil) Rubens Barrichello	(Italy) Ferrari	Report
10	(United Kingdom) British Grand Prix	(Colombia) Juan Pablo Montoya	(Brazil) Rubens Barrichello	(Germany) Michael Schumacher	(Italy) Ferrari	Report
11	(France) French Grand Prix	(Colombia) Juan Pablo Montoya	(United Kingdom) David Coulthard	(Germany) Michael Schumacher	(Italy) Ferrari	Report
12	(Germany) German Grand Prix	(Germany) Michael Schumacher	(Germany) Michael Schumacher	(Germany) Michael Schumacher	(Italy) Ferrari	Report
13	(Hungary) Hungarian Grand Prix	(Brazil) Rubens Barrichello	(Germany) Michael Schumacher	(Brazil) Rubens Barrichello	(Italy) Ferrari	Report
14	(Belgium) Belgian Grand Prix	(Germany) Michael Schumacher	(Germany) Michael Schumacher	(Germany) Michael Schumacher	(Italy) Ferrari	Report
15	(Italy) Italian Grand Prix	(Colombia) Juan Pablo Montoya	(Brazil) Rubens Barrichello	(Brazil) Rubens Barrichello	(Italy) Ferrari	Report
16	United States Grand Prix	(Germany) Michael Schumacher	(Brazil) Rubens Barrichello	(Brazil) Rubens Barrichello	(Italy) Ferrari	Report
17	(Japan) Japanese Grand Prix	(Germany) Michael Schumacher	(Germany) Michael Schumacher	(Germany) Michael Schumacher	(Italy) Ferrari	Report

=== Scoring system ===
Points were awarded to the top six finishers at each race.

Position	1st	2nd	3rd	4th	5th	6th
Points	10	6	4	3	2	1

=== World Drivers' Championship standings ===
Pos.	Driver	AUS (Australia)	MAL (Malaysia)	BRA (Brazil)	SMR (Italy)	ESP (Spain)	AUT (Austria)	MON (Monaco)	CAN (Canada)	EUR (Germany)	GBR (United Kingdom)	FRA (France)	GER (Germany)	HUN (Hungary)	BEL (Belgium)	ITA (Italy)	USA (United States)	JPN (Japan)	Points
1	(Germany) Michael Schumacher	1	3^{P}	1	1^{P}	1^{P}^{F}	1^{F}	2	1	2^{F}	1	1	1^{P}^{F}	2^{F}	1^{P}^{F}	2	2^{P}	1^{P}^{F}	144
2	(Brazil) Rubens Barrichello	Ret^{P}	Ret	Ret	2^{F}	DNS	2^{P}	7^{F}	3	1	2^{F}	DNS	4	1^{P}	2	1^{F}	1^{F}	2	77
3	(Colombia) Juan Pablo Montoya	2	2^{F}	5^{P}^{F}	4	2	3	Ret^{P}	Ret^{P}^{F}	Ret^{P}	3^{P}	4^{P}	2	11	3	Ret^{P}	4	4	50
4	(Germany) Ralf Schumacher	Ret	1	2	3	11^{†}	4	3	7	4	8	5	3	3	5	Ret	16	11^{†}	42
5	(United Kingdom) David Coulthard	Ret	Ret	3	6	3	6	1	2	Ret	10	3^{F}	5	5	4	7	3	Ret	41
6	(Finland) Kimi Räikkönen	3^{F}	Ret	12^{†}	Ret	Ret	Ret	Ret	4	3	Ret	2	Ret	4	Ret	Ret	Ret	3	24
7	(United Kingdom) Jenson Button	Ret	4	4	5	12^{†}	7	Ret	15^{†}	5	12^{†}	6	Ret	Ret	Ret	5	8	6	14
8	(Italy) Jarno Trulli	Ret	Ret	Ret	9	10^{†}	Ret	4	6	8	Ret	Ret	Ret	8	Ret	4	5	Ret	9
9	(United Kingdom) Eddie Irvine	4	Ret	7	Ret	Ret	Ret	9	Ret	Ret	Ret	Ret	Ret	Ret	6	3	10	9	8
10	(Germany) Nick Heidfeld	Ret	5	Ret	10	4	Ret	8	12	7	6	7	6	9	10	10	9	7	7
11	(Italy) Giancarlo Fisichella	Ret	13	Ret	Ret	Ret	5	5	5	Ret	7	DNQ	Ret	6	Ret	8	7	Ret	7
12	(Canada) Jacques Villeneuve	Ret	8	10^{†}	7	7	10^{†}	Ret	Ret	12	4	Ret	Ret	Ret	8	9	6	Ret	4
13	(Brazil) Felipe Massa	Ret	6	Ret	8	5	Ret	Ret	9	6	9	Ret	7	7	Ret	Ret		Ret	4
14	(France) Olivier Panis	Ret	Ret	Ret	Ret	Ret	Ret	Ret	8	9	5	Ret	Ret	12	12^{†}	6	12	Ret	3
15	(Japan) Takuma Sato	Ret	9	9	Ret	Ret	Ret	Ret	10	16	Ret	Ret	8	10	11	12	11	5	2
16	(Australia) Mark Webber	5	Ret	11	11	WD	12	11	11	15	Ret	8	Ret	16	Ret	Ret	Ret	10	2
17	(Finland) Mika Salo	6	12	6	Ret	9	8	Ret	Ret	Ret	Ret	Ret	9	15	7	11	14	8	2
18	(Germany) Heinz-Harald Frentzen	DSQ	11	Ret	Ret	6	11	6	13	13	Ret	DNQ	Ret				13		2
19	(United Kingdom) Allan McNish	Ret	7	Ret	Ret	8	9	Ret	Ret	14	Ret	11^{†}	Ret	14	9	Ret	15	DNS	0
20	(Malaysia) Alex Yoong	7	Ret	13	DNQ	WD	Ret	Ret	14	Ret	DNQ	10	DNQ			13	Ret	Ret	0
21	(Spain) Pedro de la Rosa	8	10	8	Ret	Ret	Ret	10	Ret	11	11	9	Ret	13	Ret	Ret	Ret	Ret	0
22	(Brazil) Enrique Bernoldi	DSQ	Ret	Ret	Ret	Ret	Ret	12	Ret	10	Ret	DNQ	Ret						0
—	(United Kingdom) Anthony Davidson													Ret	Ret				0
Pos.	Driver	AUS (Australia)	MAL (Malaysia)	BRA (Brazil)	SMR (Italy)	ESP (Spain)	AUT (Austria)	MON (Monaco)	CAN (Canada)	EUR (Germany)	GBR (United Kingdom)	FRA (France)	GER (Germany)	HUN (Hungary)	BEL (Belgium)	ITA (Italy)	USA (United States)	JPN (Japan)	Points

Key
Colour	Result
Gold	Winner
Silver	Second place
Bronze	Third place
Green	Other points position
Blue	Other classified position
Blue	Not classified, finished (NC)
Purple	Not classified, retired (Ret)
Red	Did not qualify (DNQ)
Black	Disqualified (DSQ)
White	Did not start (DNS)
White	Race cancelled (C)
Blank	Did not practice (DNP)
Blank	Excluded (EX)
Blank	Did not arrive (DNA)
Blank	Withdrawn (WD)
Blank	Did not enter (empty cell)
Annotation	Meaning
P	Pole position
F	Fastest lap

Notes:

- † – Driver did not finish the Grand Prix but was classified, as he completed more than 90% of the race distance.

=== World Constructors' Championship standings ===
Pos.	Constructor	No.	AUS (Australia)	MAL (Malaysia)	BRA (Brazil)	SMR (Italy)	ESP (Spain)	AUT (Austria)	MON (Monaco)	CAN (Canada)	EUR (Germany)	GBR (United Kingdom)	FRA (France)	GER (Germany)	HUN (Hungary)	BEL (Belgium)	ITA (Italy)	USA (United States)	JPN (Japan)	Points
1	(Italy) Ferrari	1	1	3^{P}	1	1^{P}	1^{P}^{F}	1^{F}	2	1	2^{F}	1	1	1^{P}^{F}	2^{F}	1^{P}^{F}	2	2^{P}	1^{P}^{F}	221
1	(Italy) Ferrari	2	Ret^{P}	Ret	Ret	2^{F}	DNS	2^{P}	7^{F}	3	1	2^{F}	DNS	4	1^{P}	2	1^{F}	1^{F}	2	221
2	(United Kingdom) Williams-BMW	5	Ret	1	2	3	11^{†}	4	3	7	4	8	5	3	3	5	Ret	16	11^{†}	92
2	(United Kingdom) Williams-BMW	6	2	2^{F}	5^{P}^{F}	4	2	3	Ret^{P}	Ret^{P}^{F}	Ret^{P}	3^{P}	4^{P}	2	11	3	Ret^{P}	4	4	92
3	(United Kingdom) McLaren-Mercedes	3	Ret	Ret	3	6	3	6	1	2	Ret	10	3^{F}	5	5	4	7	3	Ret	65
3	(United Kingdom) McLaren-Mercedes	4	3^{F}	Ret	12^{†}	Ret	Ret	Ret	Ret	4	3	Ret	2	Ret	4	Ret	Ret	Ret	3	65
4	(France) Renault	14	Ret	Ret	Ret	9	10^{†}	Ret	4	6	8	Ret	Ret	Ret	8	Ret	4	5	Ret	23
4	(France) Renault	15	Ret	4	4	5	12^{†}	7	Ret	15^{†}	5	12^{†}	6	Ret	Ret	Ret	5	8	6	23
5	(Switzerland) Sauber-Petronas	7	Ret	5	Ret	10	4	Ret	8	12	7	6	7	6	9	10	10	9	7	11
5	(Switzerland) Sauber-Petronas	8	Ret	6	Ret	8	5	Ret	Ret	9	6	9	Ret	7	7	Ret	Ret	13	Ret	11
6	(Republic of Ireland) Jordan-Honda	9	Ret	13	Ret	Ret	Ret	5	5	5	Ret	7	DNQ	Ret	6	Ret	8	7	Ret	9
6	(Republic of Ireland) Jordan-Honda	10	Ret	9	9	Ret	Ret	Ret	Ret	10	16	Ret	Ret	8	10	11	12	11	5	9
7	(United Kingdom) Jaguar-Cosworth	16	4	Ret	7	Ret	Ret	Ret	9	Ret	Ret	Ret	Ret	Ret	Ret	6	3	10	9	8
7	(United Kingdom) Jaguar-Cosworth	17	8	10	8	Ret	Ret	Ret	10	Ret	11	11	9	Ret	13	Ret	Ret	Ret	Ret	8
8	(United Kingdom) BAR-Honda	11	Ret	8	10^{†}	7	7	10^{†}	Ret	Ret	12	4	Ret	Ret	Ret	8	9	6	Ret	7
8	(United Kingdom) BAR-Honda	12	Ret	Ret	Ret	Ret	Ret	Ret	Ret	8	9	5	Ret	Ret	12	12^{†}	6	12	Ret	7
9	(Italy) Minardi-Asiatech	22	7	Ret	13	DNQ	WD	Ret	Ret	14	Ret	DNQ	10	DNQ	Ret	Ret	13	Ret	Ret	2
9	(Italy) Minardi-Asiatech	23	5	Ret	11	11	WD	12	11	11	15	Ret	8	Ret	16	Ret	Ret	Ret	10	2
10	(Japan) Toyota	24	6	12	6	Ret	9	8	Ret	Ret	Ret	Ret	Ret	9	15	7	11	14	8	2
10	(Japan) Toyota	25	Ret	7	Ret	Ret	8	9	Ret	Ret	14	Ret	11^{†}	Ret	14	9	Ret	15	DNS	2
11	(United Kingdom) Arrows-Cosworth	20	DSQ	11	Ret	Ret	6	11	6	13	13	Ret	DNQ	Ret						2
11	(United Kingdom) Arrows-Cosworth	21	DSQ	Ret	Ret	Ret	Ret	Ret	12	Ret	10	Ret	DNQ	Ret						2
Pos.	Constructor	No.	AUS (Australia)	MAL (Malaysia)	BRA (Brazil)	SMR (Italy)	ESP (Spain)	AUT (Austria)	MON (Monaco)	CAN (Canada)	EUR (Germany)	GBR (United Kingdom)	FRA (France)	GER (Germany)	HUN (Hungary)	BEL (Belgium)	ITA (Italy)	USA (United States)	JPN (Japan)	Points

Notes:

- † – Driver did not finish the Grand Prix but was classified, as he completed more than 90% of the race distance.
- Official FIA Championship classifications listed the Constructors' Championship results as Scuderia Ferrari Marlboro, BMW WilliamsF1 Team, West McLaren Mercedes, etc.
