= 2002 Canadian Grand Prix =

8th round of the 2002 Formula One season

Race 8 of 17 in the 2002 Formula One World Championship
| ← Previous race | Next race → |

Race details
- Date: 9 June 2002
- Official name: Grand Prix Air Canada 2002
- Location: Circuit Gilles Villeneuve, Montreal, Quebec, Canada
- Course: Street circuit
- Course length: 4.361 km (2.710 miles)
- Distance: 70 laps, 305.270 km (189.686 miles)
- Weather: Mostly fine and humid with temperatures reaching a maximum of 24.1 °C (75.4 °F); Wind speeds up to 8 km/h (5.0 mph)
- Attendance: 117,000

Pole position
| Driver | (Colombia) Juan Pablo Montoya | Williams-BMW |
- Time: 1:12.836

Fastest lap
| Driver | (Colombia) Juan Pablo Montoya | Williams-BMW |
- Time: 1:15.960 on lap 50

Podium
| First | (Germany) Michael Schumacher | Ferrari |
| Second | (United Kingdom) David Coulthard | McLaren-Mercedes |
| Third | (Brazil) Rubens Barrichello | Ferrari |

The 2002 Canadian Grand Prix (formally the Grand Prix Air Canada 2002) was a Formula One motor race held at the Circuit Gilles Villeneuve in Montreal, Quebec, Canada on 9 June 2002 before a record-breaking 117,000 spectators. It was the eighth round of seventeen in the 2002 Formula One World Championship, one of two North American races and the 34th Canadian Grand Prix on the Formula One calendar. Ferrari's Michael Schumacher won the 70-lap race after starting from second position. McLaren's David Coulthard finished in second and Schumacher's teammate Rubens Barrichello was third.

Going into the race, Michael Schumacher led the World Drivers' Championship and his team Ferrari led the World Constructors' Championship. Williams driver Juan Pablo Montoya took pole position for the sixth time in his career, with the quickest lap time in the one-hour qualifying session. At the end of the first lap, Barrichello passed Montoya for the lead. The safety car was deployed on the 14th lap when marshals were unable to move Jacques Villeneuve's British American Racing (BAR) car. Michael Schumacher took the lead for the first time in the race when Barrichello made the first of two scheduled pit stops on lap 26 before making his own stop 12 laps later. Montoya retook the lead and held it until his second pit stop on lap 51, when he relinquished it to Michael Schumacher, who kept it to the race finish.

It was Michael Schumacher's sixth win of the season and 59th of his career. The win strengthened his World Drivers' Championship lead to 43 championship points over the Williams pair of Ralf Schumacher and Montoya in joint second. In the World Constructors' Championship, Ferrari extended their lead to 32 championship points over Williams, McLaren a further 21 championship points behind with nine races remaining in the season.

== Background ==
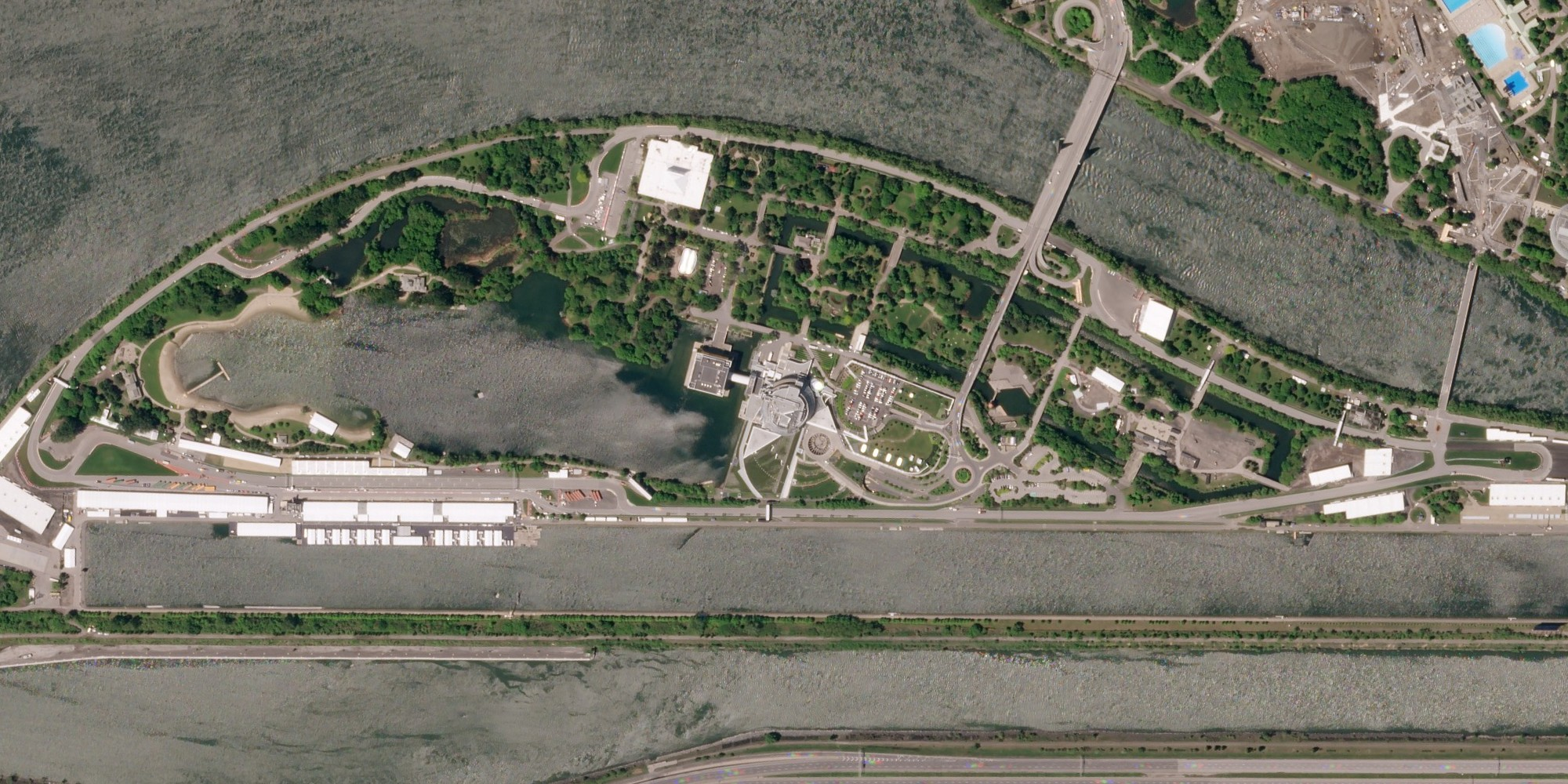
The Circuit Gilles Villeneuve (pictured in 2018), where the Grand Prix was held

The 2002 Canadian Grand Prix was the eighth of seventeen rounds in the 2002 Formula One World Championship and took place at the temporary road course Circuit Gilles Villeneuve in Montreal, Quebec, Canada on 9 June 2002. It was the 34th Canadian Grand Prix on the Formula One calendar and one of two races in North America. The Ferrari Challenge, Formula Ford 1600 and the Victory Lane Historic Can-Am held support races during the weekend.

Following the 2001 Canadian Grand Prix, the Fédération Internationale de l'Automobile (FIA; Formula One's regulatory body) requested that the circuit be shortened, increasing the race length from 69 to 70 laps. For safety reasons, the pit lane was extended parallel to the start/finish straight and straightened. The exit was now located outside the right-hand Virage Senna corner rather than the left-hand turn before it. The L'Epingle hairpin to the east was shortened by 60 m (200 ft), and gravel trap run-off sections between the first two corners and the hairpin were replaced with pavement to give drivers better car control if they ran off the circuit. The barrier at turn 13's exit was moved 2 m (6.6 ft) rearward and replaced with a tyre barrier. To improve grip, the renovated areas received new asphalt.

Heading into the Grand Prix, Ferrari's Michael Schumacher led the World Drivers' Championship with 60 championship points, followed by the Williams duo of Ralf Schumacher and Juan Pablo Montoya in joint second with 27 championship points each. McLaren's David Coulthard was fourth (20) and Michael Schumacher's teammate Rubens Barrichello was fifth (12). Ferrari led the World Constructors' Championship with 72 championship points, ahead of Williams on 54 and McLaren on 24. Renault were fourth on 11 and Sauber were fifth on eight.

Following the Monaco Grand Prix on 26 May, the teams evaluated aerodynamic, electrical, and car components, tyres, and racing setups at various European circuits in preparation for the Canadian Grand Prix. Ten out of eleven teams tested at Northamptonshire's Silverstone Circuit from 28 to 30 May. Giancarlo Fisichella (Jordan) lapped fastest on the first day, and Barrichello led on the second and final days. Minardi spent two days testing aerodynamic and downforce setups at Italy's Variano Circuit. Luca Badoer, Ferrari's test driver, tested car components on the Ferrari F2002 at the Fiorano Circuit in Italy on 3 June. British American Racing (BAR) spent four days testing the 004 car's aerodynamic package and an intermediate specification of gearbox components at France's Circuit Paul Ricard.

Prior to the event, Ferrari and its top driver, Michael Schumacher, had won five of seven races, with the exception of the Malaysian Grand Prix and the preceding Monaco Grand Prix. Despite his dominance, Michael Schumacher dismissed Coulthard's victory at Monaco as a one-off due to the track's tight and bumpy nature, but expressed confidence in the race in Canada due to Ferrari's increased race pace. Mercedes-Benz vice-president Norbert Haug warned the audience not to expect a repetition of Coulthard's Monaco win since the Montreal track was unlikely to favour the McLaren MP4-17. Barrichello said he had achieved something in every race in 2002 to make him "feel good about my performance, whether it was taking pole in the first race in Australia or setting the fastest race lap in the last one in Monaco", adding, "I feel as though I am knocking on the big door and I am coming to Canada in a very motivated mood."

There were eleven teams (each representing a different constructor) with two drivers each for the Grand Prix, with no changes from the season entry list. Most teams focused substantially on their cars' braking systems because the Circuit Gilles Villeneuve put a lot of strain on them, and several teams tested brakes from various manufacturers, including Brembo, Carbon Industrie and Hitco. BMW and Mercedes introduced more powerful engines; McLaren ran theirs in qualifying and Williams during the race. Sauber debuted new front suspension systems that use titanium lower wishbones rather than steel. BAR designer Geoff Willis extensively changed the 004 car, installing two fins that extended from the centre of the side to the front of the rear wheels. Jaguar received a new V10 engine from Cosworth for practice and qualifying and Toyota gave driver Mika Salo a new TF102 chassis.

== Practice ==
Preceding the race were two one-hour practice sessions on Friday and two 45-minute sessions on Saturday. Conditions were warm and sunny for the first practice session; teams tested fuel loads and tyre compounds with their drivers. Barrichello led with a 1:16.930 lap set in the session's last moments. Michael Schumacher, Fisichella, the McLaren pair of Coulthard and Kimi Räikkönen, Arrows's Heinz-Harald Frentzen, BAR's Olivier Panis, Sauber's Felipe Massa, Montoya and Jaguar's Pedro de la Rosa followed in the top ten. Following his final fast lap, Michael Schumacher run slightly wide at the final turn and hit with the exit outside barrier, breaking his right-rear wheel rim. When his car began tilting sideways on the start/finish straight, he carefully drove to the pit lane. Enrique Bernoldi stopped his Arrows car at turn six with a minor hydraulic fault.

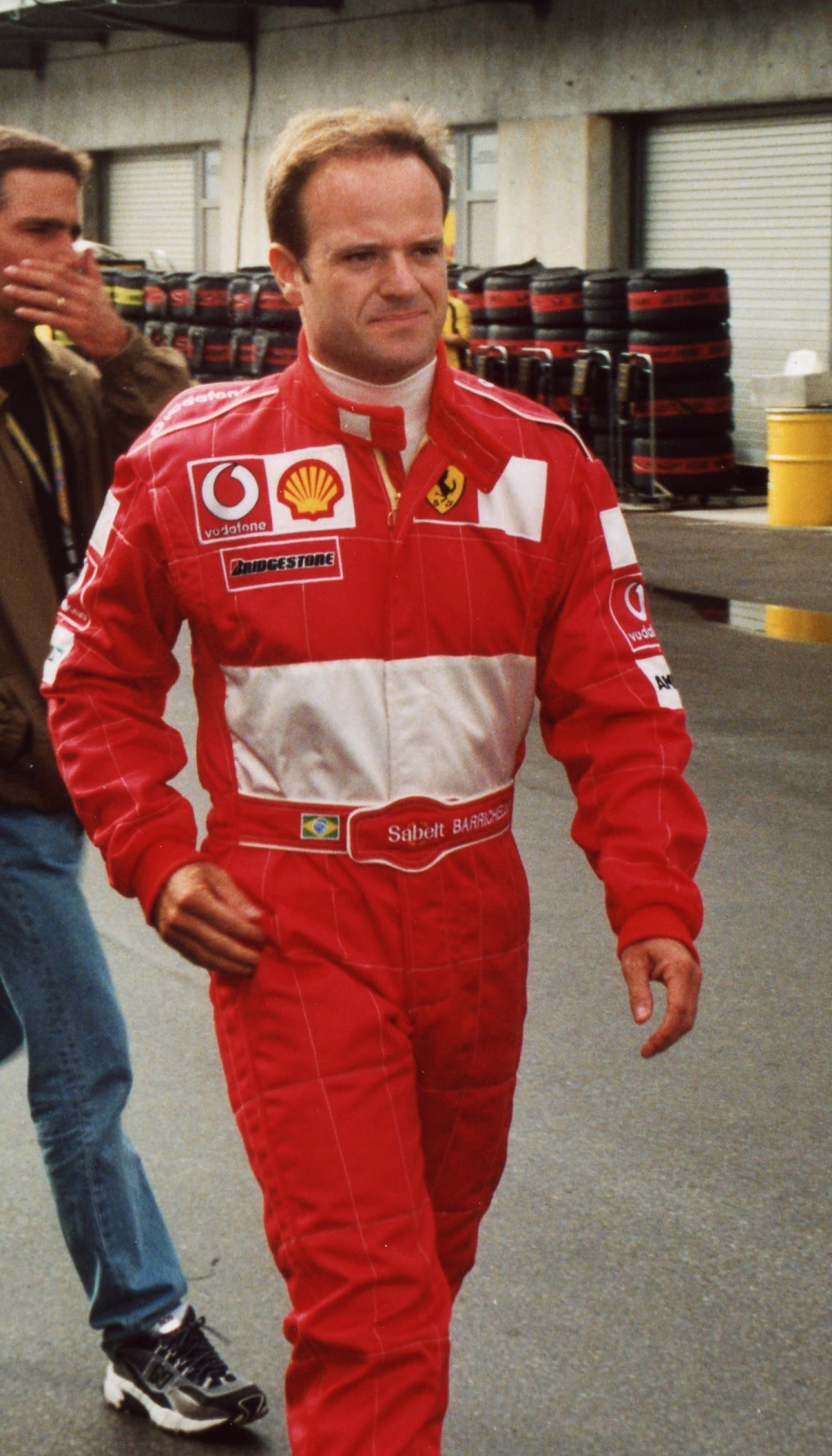
Rubens Barrichello damaged his Ferrari in a crash during the fourth free practice session but the car was repaired in time for qualifying.

It continued to be warm and sunny for the second practice session. Coulthard set the day's fastest time of 1:15.407, almost four-tenths of a second faster than Michael Schumacher's pole lap in 2001. Montoya, Michael Schumacher, Räikkönen, Ralf Schumacher, Salo, Panis, Barrichello, BAR's Jacques Villeneuve and Frentzen rounded out the top ten. Jarno Trulli's Renault stopped on the track seven minutes into the session with an undisclosed technical issue, forcing him to miss the rest of Friday practice.

Conditions were fine and warm for the third practice session. Michael Schumacher posted the quickest lap time of 1:14.509 shortly before the session ended, with the fastest four racers all lapping in under 1:15. The Williams duo of Montoya and Ralf Schumacher, Barrichello, Räikkönen, Frentzen, Panis, Massa, Coulthard and Villeneuve completed the top ten. After 15 minutes, Jordan's Takuma Sato spun at turn six and then went onto the grass at turn eight. Räikkönen lost control of his McLaren's rear after turn four, although he missed striking the wall and spent almost a minute reversing to continue racing.

The final practice session was held in cool and overcast conditions after cloud cover obscured the sun. Michael Schumacher set the session's fastest lap time of 1:13.395 after 17 minutes, 0.251 seconds faster than Montoya. Barrichello, Räikkönen, Ralf Schumacher, Coulthard, Massa, his Sauber teammate Nick Heidfeld, Villeneuve and Fisichella were in positions three to ten. Some drivers lost control of their cars during the session. Barrichello locked his tyres mounting the kerbs into the turn eight and nine chicane and went airborne before crashing into the outside wall, removing Barrichello's right-front wheel. His Ferrari was repaired in less than two hours so he could compete in qualifying. Eddie Irvine's Jaguar stopped at the hairpin at the end of practice due to a fuel pump failure.

== Qualifying ==
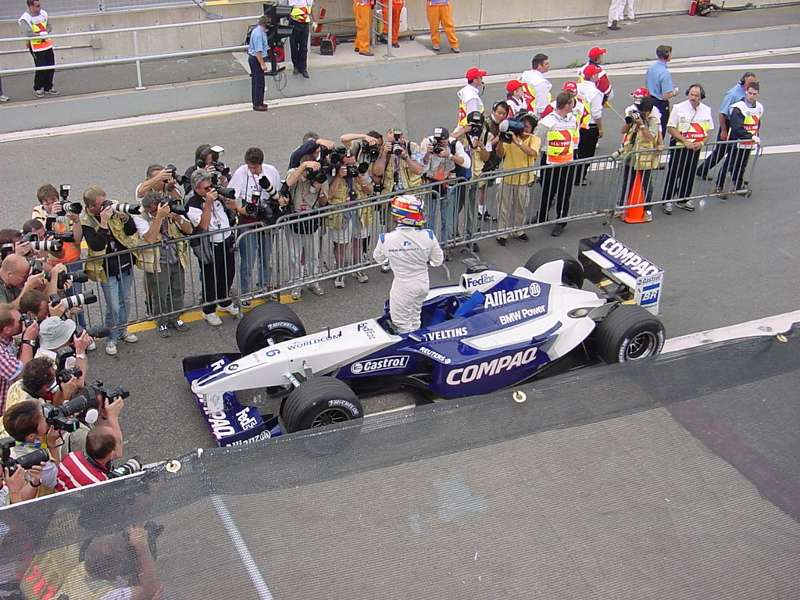
Juan Pablo Montoya celebrating qualifying on pole position for the third time in the season and the sixth time in his career.

Each driver was allowed twelve laps during Saturday's one-hour qualifying session, with starting positions determined by the drivers' quickest laps. During this session, the 107% rule was in effect, requiring each driver to remain within 107% of the quickest lap time in order to qualify for the race. White clouds blocked the sun, resulting in lower ambient temperatures throughout qualifying. With four minutes remaining, rain began to fail on the circuit, stopping drivers from lapping quicker. Montoya's lap time of 1:12.836 earned him his third pole position of the season and sixth of his career, three seconds faster than the 2001 pole lap time and it was the only sub-1:13 qualifying lap. Michael Schumacher qualified second, 0.182 seconds slower, after briefly holding pole position in qualifying until Montoya's second run. He aborted his final run because the rain had made the track damp. In his repaired Ferrari, Barrichello qualified third after losing control of the rear at the entry to turn four on his last run on the wet circuit. He returned to the pit lane with his car undamaged. Ralf Schumacher, fourth, drove the spare Williams car setup for Montoya because his car developed a pneumatic engine valve gear leak. Räikkönen was the faster of the McLaren drivers in fifth after consistent running. Fisichella qualified sixth, his best result of the season at the time, setting his fastest lap with four minutes remaining when the track was least damp. Heidfeld qualified seventh. He made a slight racing setup tweak for his third run, which did not help his car. Coulthard, seventh, had his second and third runs hampered by oil from Sato's car, and he spun at the final turn attempting to lap quicker on the damp track. Villeneuve took ninth, his best qualifying result of 2002 thus far. With six minutes remaining, as he drove out from the pit lane exit line to begin his final flying lap, his rear wheels locked up due to a gearbox failure, and he went onto the grass. Trulli, tenth, damaged his Renault's right-rear suspension in an accident with a concrete wall at the turn nine exit. He drove cautiously to the pit lane and got into the spare car.

Panis qualified 11th. At the end of his first lap, his car experienced a shifting fault, claiming his car was uncomfortable to brake heavily. Massa was 12th with an oil radiator leak, wrong differential settings, and no traction control system on his first run. Sato's oil affected Massa's second run before adjusting his downforce, which degraded his car on his third lap. Renault's Jenson Button took 13th, failing to run in the slipstream of another car on all four runs. Irvine set six laps in the spare Jaguar because he missed the most of qualifying due to a gearbox hydraulic pump issue, taking 14th. On his second run, Sato's engine failed midway through qualifying, leaving oil on the circuit between turns three and four. Smoke and fire billowed from his engine, creating fog that reduced visibility. Sato abandoned his car on the circuit and returned to the pit lane to drive his teammate Fisichella's spare Jordan car setup, qualifying 15th. De la Rosa was 16th but could not lap faster because of the rain. Bernoldi improved on each of his runs, finishing 17th and being the fastest Arrows driver for the first time in 2002. Salo was the best Toyota driver in 18th, but had to abandon two runs because of yellow flags and Sato's oil. Frentzen's car was leaking water after his first run due to a leaking water radiator, and by the time the radiator was rebuilt, oil and rain had appeared, leaving him 19th. Toyota's Allan McNish, 20th, had grip issues and could not locate a good handling balance. The two Minardi drivers of Mark Webber and Alex Yoong qualified at the back of the grid in 21st and 22nd; Yoong stopped on track at the start of his final run due to a gearbox issue. In total, 21 of the 22 qualifiers lapped quicker than Michael Schumacher's 2001 pole lap record.

=== Qualifying classification ===
| Pos | No | Driver | Constructor | Lap | Gap | Grid |
|---|---|---|---|---|---|---|
| 1 | 6 | (Colombia) Juan Pablo Montoya | Williams-BMW | 1:12.836 | — | 1 |
| 2 | 1 | (Germany) Michael Schumacher | Ferrari | 1:13.018 | +0.182 | 2 |
| 3 | 2 | (Brazil) Rubens Barrichello | Ferrari | 1:13.280 | +0.444 | 3 |
| 4 | 5 | (Germany) Ralf Schumacher | Williams-BMW | 1:13.301 | +0.465 | 4 |
| 5 | 4 | (Finland) Kimi Räikkönen | McLaren-Mercedes | 1:13.898 | +1.062 | 5 |
| 6 | 9 | (Italy) Giancarlo Fisichella | Jordan-Honda | 1:14.132 | +1.296 | 6 |
| 7 | 7 | (Germany) Nick Heidfeld | Sauber-Petronas | 1:14.139 | +1.303 | 7 |
| 8 | 3 | (United Kingdom) David Coulthard | McLaren-Mercedes | 1:14.385 | +1.549 | 8 |
| 9 | 11 | (Canada) Jacques Villeneuve | BAR-Honda | 1:14.564 | +1.728 | 9 |
| 10 | 14 | (Italy) Jarno Trulli | Renault | 1:14.688 | +1.852 | 10 |
| 11 | 12 | (France) Olivier Panis | BAR-Honda | 1:14.713 | +1.877 | 11 |
| 12 | 8 | (Brazil) Felipe Massa | Sauber-Petronas | 1:14.823 | +1.987 | 12 |
| 13 | 15 | (United Kingdom) Jenson Button | Renault | 1:14.854 | +2.018 | 13 |
| 14 | 16 | (United Kingdom) Eddie Irvine | Jaguar-Cosworth | 1:14.882 | +2.046 | 14 |
| 15 | 10 | (Japan) Takuma Sato | Jordan-Honda | 1:14.940 | +2.104 | 15 |
| 16 | 17 | (Spain) Pedro de la Rosa | Jaguar-Cosworth | 1:15.089 | +2.253 | 16 |
| 17 | 21 | (Brazil) Enrique Bernoldi | Arrows-Cosworth | 1:15.102 | +2.266 | 17 |
| 18 | 24 | (Finland) Mika Salo | Toyota | 1:15.111 | +2.275 | 18 |
| 19 | 20 | (Germany) Heinz-Harald Frentzen | Arrows-Cosworth | 1:15.115 | +2.279 | 19 |
| 20 | 25 | (United Kingdom) Allan McNish | Toyota | 1:15.321 | +2.485 | 20 |
| 21 | 23 | (Australia) Mark Webber | Minardi-Asiatech | 1:15.508 | +2.672 | 21 |
| 22 | 22 | (Malaysia) Alex Yoong | Minardi-Asiatech | 1:17.347 | +4.511 | 22 |
107% time: 1:17.935

== Warm-up ==
On race morning, a half-hour warm-up session was held for teams to shake down their race and spare cars in partially cloudy and warm conditions. The track was slippery following heavy rain the day before. Michael Schumacher set the pace with a lap time of 1:16.780, ahead of teammate Barrichello, Ralf Schumacher, Coulthard, Bernoldi, Trulli, De la Rosa, Panis, Montoya and Massa. With eight minutes left. Michael Schumacher's engine failed in the spare Ferrari, causing it to stop at the entry to turn 15 with smoke billowing from it. Frentzen ran wide onto the turn six grass, removing part of a bargeboard from his car and losing control of the rear braking for the hairpin.

== Race ==
The race commenced before a record 117,000 spectators in fine and sunny conditions at 14:00 local time. The air temperature ranged between 22 and 24 °C (72 and 75 °F) and the track temperature was between 32 and 35 °C (90 and 95 °F). When the race began, Montoya cut over the circuit in front of Michael Schumacher, retaining the lead into the first turn. Michael Schumacher allowed Barrichello to pass him for second position as part of a planned strategy due to Barrichello's lighter fuel load and Schumacher's heavy fuel load. Räikkönen went from fifth to fourth, Ralf Schumacher dropped to fifth, and Coulthard passed Heidfeld and Fisichella to take sixth. Unlike prior years, no driver crashed in the first two turns. Button overtook Villeneuve for tenth. At the end of the first lap, Barrichello, with a light fuel load, outaccelerated Montoya on the start/finish straight and took the race lead on the inside coming into the first turn. McNish and De la Rosa collided on the back straight, putting De la Rosa into the wall near the pit lane entry. De la Rosa slowly entered the pit lane for car repairs after his wheel rims were damaged, rejoining the race a lap down.

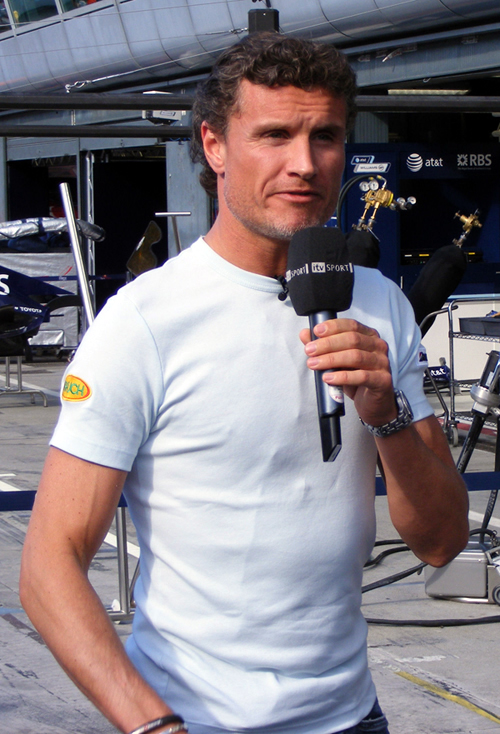
David Coulthard (pictured in 2007) finished in second

Barrichello gradually increased his lead over Montoya, setting five fastest laps in the opening 14 laps. Sato overtook Massa for 14th on lap three and Bernoldi passed Irvine for 16th the following lap. On lap six, Salo passed Panis at the hairpin for 11th. Sato overtook Villeneuve on lap nine but let him pass on the start/finish straight, believing he had cut the chicane during the pass. Lap ten saw the Grand Prix's first retirement. Villeneuve stopped his car at the side of the track at the exit to turn 12 when the engine overheated following a drop in oil pressure by lap two. Bernoldi cut the chicane and passed Panis on lap 11 for 14th. The marshals could not safely relocate Villeneuve's car because the rear wheels were locked. This prompted the race director to deploy the safety car on lap 14, allowing a tow truck to remove Villeneuve's car. The safety car's deployment eliminated Barrichello's 4.3-second lead and bunched the field up. It persuaded Williams to bring Montoya into the pit lane for his first pit stop on lap 14. His 11-second stop for fuel and to clear the radiator inlets of leaves blown across the track by the wind dropped him to fifth, behind Räikkönen and Ralf Schumacher. Bernoldi entered his pit garage to retire with a right-rear wheel suspension problem on lap 17.

At the end of lap 17, the safety car was withdrawn and driven into pit lane, and racing resumed with Barrichello leading teammate Michael Schumacher. Räikkönen was taken off guard by the restart, dropping two seconds behind both Ferraris. At the end of lap 18, both Räikkönen and Ralf Schumacher lost control and ran wide at the final chicane. Räikkönen clattered the kerbing and baulked Ralf Schumacher, allowing Montoya to pass the two on the start/finish straight and go into third. Barrichello began pulling away from the rest of the field, while Montoya fell behind Michael Schumacher. On lap 20, Ralf Schumacher unsuccessfully attempted to pass Räikkönen on the inside at turn one. Three laps later, Salo overtook Button for tenth. Ferrari kept Barrichello on the circuit during the safety car period, so he entered the pit lane for the first of two pit stops at the conclusion of lap 26. His 10.6-second stop for fuel, tyres, and removal of leaves from his sidepods dropped him to sixth, behind Coulthard. This dropped Barrichello out of contention for the win. However, it elevated Barrichello's teammate Michael Schumacher to the race lead, and he began pushing hard to extend his lead over the heavier-fuelled Montoya before his pit stop.

Barrichello closed on Coulthard but was unable to pass due to Coulthard's defensive driving. De la Rosa slowed on lap 32 due to a gearbox problem and retired to the side of the circuit. Salo was penalised for speeding in the pit lane on the same lap due to a faulty speed limiter. He took his penalty on lap 33. Michael Schumacher had a 23.9-second lead over Montoya when he made his sole pit stop on the 38th lap, despite Yoong being ahead. Ferrari removed debris from Michael Schumacher's sidepods, and his 11.6-second stop moved Montoya to the race lead, dropping Schumacher to second. Michael Schumacher was 3.6 seconds behind, with Montoya's second pit stop still to come. Montoya moved away from Michael Schumacher, who was initially struggling with his new tyres. Ralf Schumacher entered the pit lane for a new set of rear tyres on lap 42. Mechanics discovered a problem with the refuelling rig feed, preventing the fuel from being delivered correctly, and not all of the expected fuel entered his car. This promoted Fisichella into sixth. Irvine retired at the side of the track on lap 43 due to rising gearbox temperatures.

On lap 45, Ralf Schumacher made an unscheduled pit stop for fuel with the spare refuelling rig to ensure he could finish. Räikkönen made his only pit stop of the event from third on the following lap. His 7.8 second stop dropped him to fifth. McNish spun in turn four on lap 48 due to gearbox shifting issues locking the gearbox and a handling imbalance caused by his first-lap collision with De la Rosa. McNish's Toyota was stationary in the centre of the circuit but the safety car was not deployed since it had been moved to a safe area. Coulthard concluded his long spell on the track by making his only pit stop from third place on lap 50, becoming the final driver on a one-stop strategy to stop. He rejoined the circuit in fourth, behind Barrichello but just ahead of his teammate Räikkönen. On lap 51, race leader Montoya made his second pit stop. His 8.2-second pit stop demoted him to third, behind the two Ferraris. Barrichello had closing on teammate and new race leader Michael Schumacher until he made his second pit stop at the end of lap 53. His 6.4-second pit stop for fuel and no tyres dropped him to fourth, just behind Coulthard.

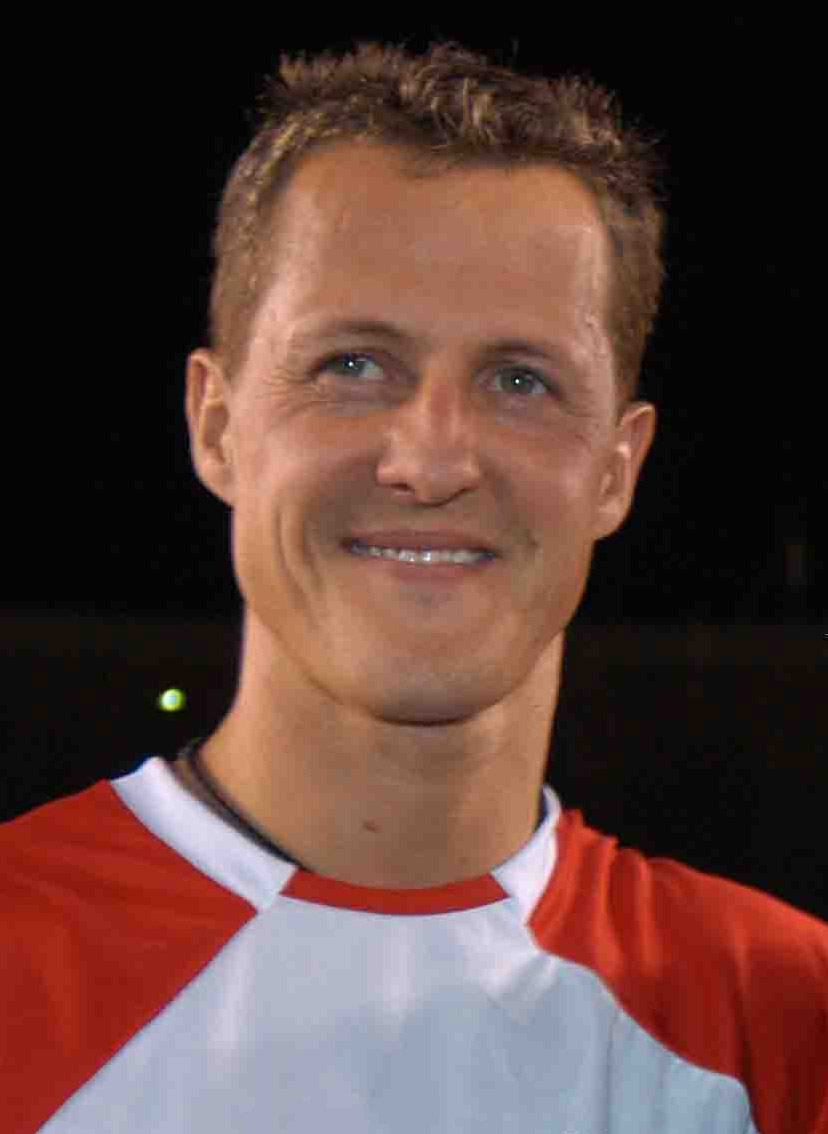
Michael Schumacher (pictured in 2005) took Ferrari's 150th Grand Prix as well as the 59th of his career.

Montoya was closing up on Michael Schumacher when he exited the final chicane on lap 56, smoke billowing from the car's rear due to an unexpected engine failure. On the next lap, he pulled up onto the grass near the pit lane exit, retiring. Montoya's retirement promoted Coulthard to second and Barrichello to third, with both drivers battling over second. On lap 60, Coulthard planned to lap Sato at the L'Epingle hairpin but failed, allowing Barrichello to slipstream and eventually get alongside Coulthard on the run into the final chicane. Coulthard, on the outside, braked at the last possible moment to avoid Barrichello passing him, causing both druvers to enter the chicane run-off area. Neither driver received a penalty since they had not gained an advantage. Button lost drive on lap 68 on the Casino Straight when his engine cut out after overheating, becoming the race's final retirement.

Michael Schumacher slowed in the final 13 laps after Montoya retired, allowing Coulthard to close in. However, he retained the lead for the remainder of the race, winning his sixth of eight races this season and 59th of his career. It was also Ferrari's 150th Grand Prix victory. Coulthard finished second, 1.132 seconds behind, ahead of Barrichello in third. Räikkönen finished fourth, despite a fuel rig system issue that caused insufficient fuel to enter his McLaren, forcing the team to slow him to conserve fuel. He ran out of fuel on the slow-down lap. Fisichella achieved his third consecutive fifth position result. Trulli was the last of the point-scorers in sixth, despite bad brakes. Ralf Schumacher finished seventh, after being held off by Trulli in the final laps and running wide at turn one on lap 69. On the slow down lap, Ralf Schumacher's engine failed, pulling off the circuit with smoke billowing from his car's rear. Panis was on a one-stop strategy and went untroubled to finish eighth, a lap down, but had his first finish of the season. Massa was ninth, having battled Panis late in the race. Sato finished 10th, ahead of Webber in 11th. Heidfeld finished 12th due to a software problem in the Sauber car's pit lane speed limiter, allowing him to brake the speed limit at the pit lane exit, incurring two drive-through penalties. Frentzen finished 13th after losing time due to poor braking, handling, and a refuelling rig issue. Yoong was the last finisher after incurring a ten-second stop-and-go penalty for speeding in the pit lane and his drink bottle failing early in the race. Salo, the other driver that retired, had braking troubles after 41 laps. Just 14 of the 22 qualifiers were running at the end.

=== Post-race ===
The top three drivers appeared on the podium to collect their trophies and spoke to the media in the subsequent press conference. Michael Schumacher liked his car's package, although blistering on the left-rear tyre cost him performance, "but then obviously it was still good enough to win the race. In normal circumstances, we would probably be in first and second, but that's the way it goes and we're pretty happy with the result so far and obviously with the package we've had here." Coulthard said he did not believe that he would be on a podium "in a straight fight" but was confident of securing a points-scoring finish despite starting from eighth. Barrichello commented on his start, "I think being at the right place on the track helped but I had a good reaction time and everything worked fantastically." He stated that he was fine with a two-stop strategy since he wanted to push hard and see if he could win the race.

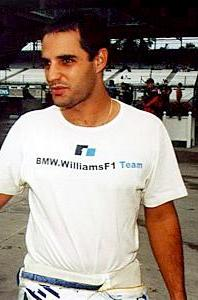
Montoya left the track without speaking to the media after the race following his engine failure on lap 57.

After the race, Coulthard and Barrichello discussed their battle during the race. Coulthard said he took a gamble and would have allowed Barrichello past had he not cut the chicane. Barrichello did not criticise Coulthard but commented, "when you see some guy going fast on the outside you don't want to let it happen, so you come off the brakes as well." Barrichello was also perplexed by the decision to use the safety car for Villeneuve's stalled BAR vehicle on lap 14, believing that no one would have crashed into the stationary car. Räikkönen said he was pleased to finish fourth, "to finish in the points was a nice way to end the weekend." Fisichella said scoring two extra championship points had ensured "another good day in Montreal", while Jordan team owner Eddie Jordan heralded the fifth-place finish as "well-earned". After finishing sixth, Trulli stated the Grand Prix was difficult, but appreciated his Renault's balance after reducing downforce provided him great straight-line speed.

Montoya was irate after retiring due to an engine issue and left the track without speaking to the media. Williams technical director Patrick Head opined Montoya would have won the race without retiring, adding, "It's obviously disappointing. But that's the way in sport – sometimes it works your way and sometimes it doesn't." Michelin director Pierre Dupasquier said he was convinced Montoya would have battled and overtaken Michael Schumacher in the final laps but added "that's racing". BMW's Gerhard Berger said two engine failures cost Williams championship points and the brand's motorsport director Mario Theissen said they would analyse the reason for the two engine failures at their headquarters in Munich.

Michael Schumacher's victory increased his World Drivers' Championship lead to 43 championship points over Ralf Schumacher and Montoya in joint second. Coulthard's second-place finish moved him to one championship point of the Williams duo while Barrichello kept fifth on 16 championship points. Ferrari extended their lead over Williams in the World Constructors' Championship to 32 championship points. McLaren maintained third with 33 championship points while Renault and Sauber stayed fourth and fifth with nine rounds remaining in the season.

=== Race classification ===
Drivers who scored championship points are denoted in bold.

| Pos | No | Driver | Constructor | Tyre | Laps | Time/Retired | Grid | Points |
|---|---|---|---|---|---|---|---|---|
| 1 | 1 | (Germany) **Michael Schumacher** | **Ferrari** | B | 70 | 1:33:36.111 | 2 | 10 |
| 2 | 3 | (United Kingdom) **David Coulthard** | **McLaren-Mercedes** | M | 70 | +1.132 | 8 | 6 |
| 3 | 2 | (Brazil) **Rubens Barrichello** | **Ferrari** | B | 70 | +7.082 | 3 | 4 |
| 4 | 4 | (Finland) **Kimi Räikkönen** | **McLaren-Mercedes** | M | 70 | +37.563 | 5 | 3 |
| 5 | 9 | (Italy) **Giancarlo Fisichella** | **Jordan-Honda** | B | 70 | +42.812 | 6 | 2 |
| 6 | 14 | (Italy) **Jarno Trulli** | **Renault** | M | 70 | +48.947 | 10 | 1 |
| 7 | 5 | (Germany) Ralf Schumacher | Williams-BMW | M | 70 | +51.518 | 4 | |
| 8 | 12 | (France) Olivier Panis | BAR-Honda | B | 69 | +1 Lap | 11 | |
| 9 | 8 | (Brazil) Felipe Massa | Sauber-Petronas | B | 69 | +1 Lap | 12 | |
| 10 | 10 | (Japan) Takuma Sato | Jordan-Honda | B | 69 | +1 Lap | 15 | |
| 11 | 23 | (Australia) Mark Webber | Minardi-Asiatech | M | 69 | +1 Lap | 21 | |
| 12 | 7 | (Germany) Nick Heidfeld | Sauber-Petronas | B | 69 | +1 Lap | 7 | |
| 13 | 20 | (Germany) Heinz-Harald Frentzen | Arrows-Cosworth | B | 69 | +1 Lap | 19 | |
| 14 | 22 | (Malaysia) Alex Yoong | Minardi-Asiatech | M | 68 | +2 Laps | 22 | |
| 15 | 15 | (United Kingdom) Jenson Button | Renault | M | 65 | Gearbox | 13 | |
| Ret | 6 | (Colombia) Juan Pablo Montoya | Williams-BMW | M | 56 | Engine | 1 | |
| Ret | 25 | (United Kingdom) Allan McNish | Toyota | M | 45 | Spin | 20 | |
| Ret | 16 | (United Kingdom) Eddie Irvine | Jaguar-Cosworth | M | 41 | Overheating | 14 | |
| Ret | 24 | (Finland) Mika Salo | Toyota | M | 41 | Brakes | 18 | |
| Ret | 17 | (Spain) Pedro de la Rosa | Jaguar-Cosworth | M | 29 | Gearbox | 16 | |
| Ret | 21 | (Brazil) Enrique Bernoldi | Arrows-Cosworth | B | 16 | Suspension | 17 | |
| Ret | 11 | (Canada) Jacques Villeneuve | BAR-Honda | B | 8 | Engine | 9 | |

== Championship standings after the race ==
Drivers' Championship standings

| +/– | Pos | Driver | Points |
|---|---|---|---|
| | 1 | (Germany) Michael Schumacher | 70 |
| | 2 | (Germany) Ralf Schumacher | 27 |
| | 3 | (Colombia) Juan Pablo Montoya | 27 |
| | 4 | (United Kingdom) David Coulthard | 26 |
| | 5 | (Brazil) Rubens Barrichello | 16 |

Constructors' Championship standings

| +/– | Pos | Constructor | Points |
|---|---|---|---|
| | 1 | (Italy) Ferrari | 86 |
| | 2 | (United Kingdom) Williams-BMW | 54 |
| | 3 | (United Kingdom) McLaren-Mercedes | 33 |
| | 4 | (France) Renault | 12 |
| | 5 | (Switzerland) Sauber-Petronas | 8 |
Sources:

- Note: Only the top five positions are included for both sets of standings.

| Previous race: 2002 Monaco Grand Prix | FIA Formula One World Championship; 2002 season | Next race: 2002 European Grand Prix |
| Previous race: 2001 Canadian Grand Prix | Canadian Grand Prix | Next race: 2003 Canadian Grand Prix |
