= 2002 Malaysian Grand Prix =

Second round of the 2002 Formula One season

Coordinates: 2°45′39.2″N 101°44′16.2″E

Race 2 of 17 in the 2002 Formula One World Championship
← Previous race	Next race →

Race details
- Date: 17 March 2002
- Official name: 2002 Petronas Malaysian Grand Prix
- Location: Sepang International Circuit, Sepang, Selangor, Malaysia
- Course: Permanent racing facility
- Course length: 5.543 km (3.444 miles)
- Distance: 56 laps, 310.408 km (192.879 miles)
- Weather: Partially cloudy, hot, and dry
- Attendance: 92,000

Pole position
Driver	(Germany) Michael Schumacher	Ferrari
- Time: 1:35.266

Fastest lap
Driver	(Colombia) Juan Pablo Montoya	Williams-BMW
- Time: 1:38.049 on lap 38

Podium
First	(Germany) Ralf Schumacher	Williams-BMW
Second	(Colombia) Juan Pablo Montoya	Williams-BMW
Third	(Germany) Michael Schumacher	Ferrari

The 2002 Malaysian Grand Prix (officially the 2002 Petronas Malaysian Grand Prix) was a Formula One motor race held before 92,000 spectators at the Sepang International Circuit in Sepang, Selangor, Malaysia on 17 March 2002. It was the second round of 17 in the 2002 Formula One World Championship and the fourth Formula One Malaysian Grand Prix. Williams driver Ralf Schumacher won the 56-lap race after starting from fourth position. His teammate Juan Pablo Montoya finished in second, ahead of Ferrari's Michael Schumacher in third.

Going into the race, Michael Schumacher and Ferrari led the World Drivers' Championship and World Constructors Championship, respectively. Michael Schumacher qualified on pole position by setting the fastest lap time in the one-hour qualifying session. At the start of the race, Michael Schumacher and Montoya collided at the first corner, promoting Schumacher's teammate Rubens Barrichello to the race lead. Barrichello maintained the lead until the first round of pit stops when Ralf Schumacher took over the position. Ralf Schumacher led for most of the remainder of the Grand Prix to secure his fourth career victory, with Montoya in second 39.7 seconds behind after serving the first-ever drive-through penalty – imposed on him for the first lap accident. Michael Schumacher secured third on the final lap after overtaking Renault's Jenson Button, who had a suspected anti-roll bar bracket failure that slowed him with two laps remaining.

Ralf Schumacher's and Montoya's one-two finish promoted Williams to the lead of the World Constructors' Championship by eight championship points over Ferrari. Michael Schumacher's lead in the World Drivers' Championship was reduced to two championship points over Montoya and four over race winner Ralf Schumacher with 15 races remaining in the season.

== Background ==
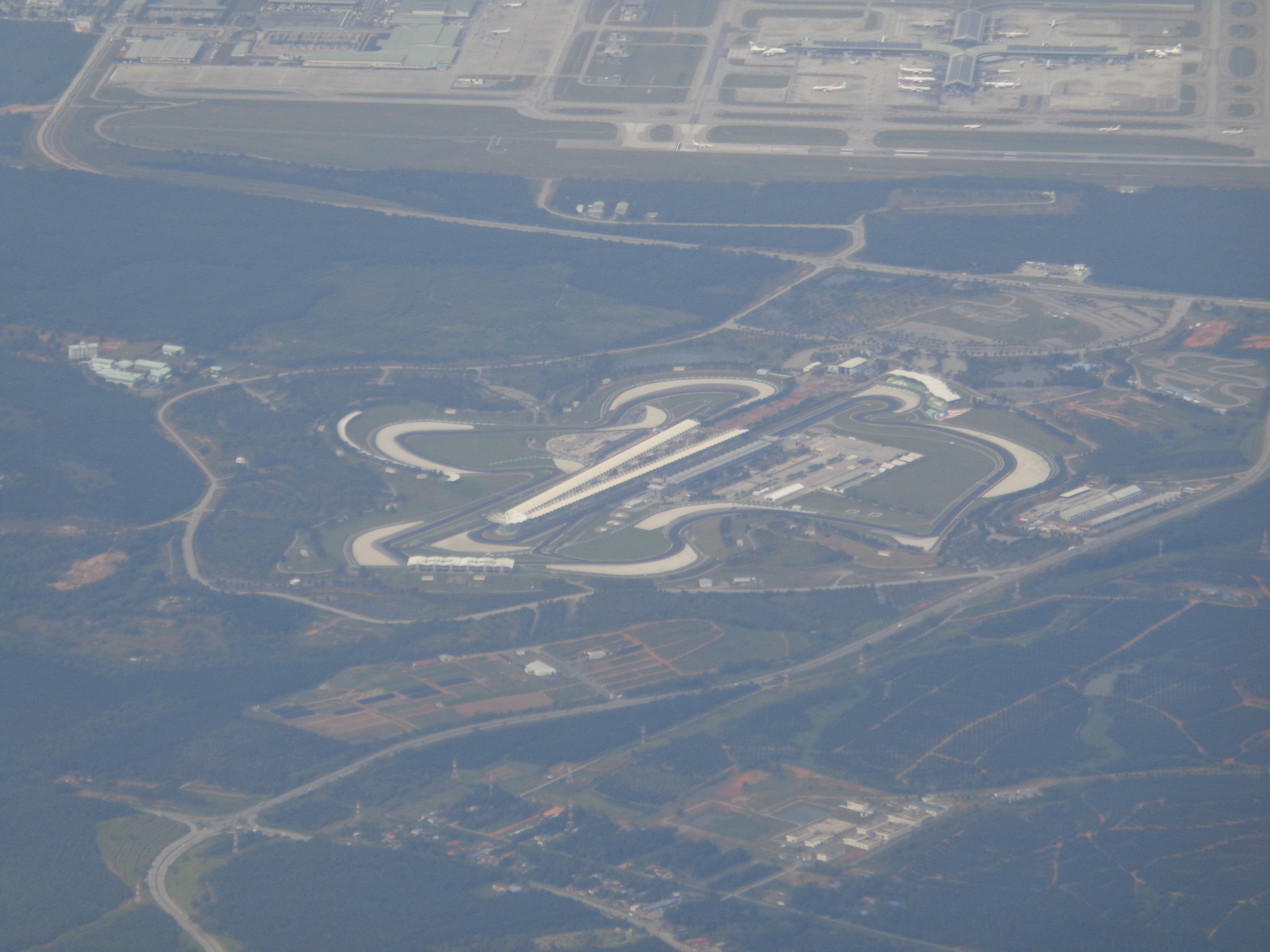
The Sepang International Circuit, where the race was held

The 2002 Malaysian Grand Prix, the second round of seventeen in the 2002 Formula One World Championship, was held at the Sepang International Circuit in Sepang, Selangor, Malaysia on 17 March 2002, the fourth time a Formula One Grand Prix was taking place at Sepang. The Fédération Internationale de l'Automobile (FIA), motorsport's governing body, had sanctioned a race in Malaysia since the 1960s, with the initial events staged in Singapore, then part of the Malaysian Federation, before moving to the Shah Alam Circuit. When the Formula One Grand Prix debuted in 1999, it was transferred to the purpose-built Sepang International Circuit, where it remained until 2017. The track underwent safety upgrades, with 18 new safety fences installed to protect trackside personnel and the installation of new kerbs and gutters at five corners. A 60 m (200 ft) section of track on the straight between turns 11 and 12 was repaved.

After winning the season-opening Australian Grand Prix, Ferrari driver Michael Schumacher led the World Drivers' Championship with ten championship points, ahead of Williams' Juan Pablo Montoya with six and McLaren's Kimi Räikkönen with four. Jaguar's Eddie Irvine and Minardi's Mark Webber were in fourth and fifth positions with three and two championship points, respectively. Ferrari led the World Constructors' Championship with Williams second and McLaren third with ten championship points.

Following the Australian Grand Prix on 3 March, six teams held in-season testing sessions at various European racing courses ahead of the Malaysian Grand Prix. Luciano Burti, Ferrari's test driver, spent four days testing mechanical components and Bridgestone tyres on a F2001 chassis at Italy's Fiorano Circuit. Williams and Renault spent three days at Northamptonshire's Silverstone Circuit, joined by British American Racing (BAR) concentrating on aerodynamic and engine development on the second and third days. Toyota conducted a two-day test of electrical and mechanical components on its TF102 car with test driver Stéphane Sarrazin at Circuit Paul Ricard in Southern France, while Jean Alesi spent three days at the same track testing Michelin tyres in a McLaren MP4-16B car. The Arrows, Jaguar, Jordan, Minardi and Sauber teams did not test.

Ferrari had won all three Formula One races at Sepang since its debut in 1999. Michael Schumacher, the pre-race favourite with most bookmakers, stated he was confident of winning the race after finishing first in Australia with a year-old car. Montoya said coming second in Australia helped him cement "a good start to the season" for himself, adding he was taking a step-by-step approach, "I'm not going to rush into things. Our target is to improve on last year's position and of course to be more consistent" after retiring in Sepang the previous year. His teammate Ralf Schumacher encouraged drivers to take extra precautions to avoid a multi-car accident, as seen on the first lap in Australia. He planned to prevent his brother from winning in Malaysia again and hoped for no monsoons. Renault's Jenson Button was more optimistic, reckoning he could secure a podium result.

Michelin introduced a new radical tyre compound for the race. Tyres were a major topic leading into the Grand Prix, with Michelin predicted to outperform Bridgestone if conditions were hot. However, Michael Schumacher warned Bridgestone had closed the gap on Michelin's warm-weather performance but said a Williams driver would finish on the podium. Ralf Schumacher was convinced that Michelin's new tyre compound would correct an early performance drop-off and help him close the gap to Ferrari in Malaysia. The drivers met on Friday afternoon to discuss a gentlemen's agreement on "non-aggression" at the first corner on the first lap to avoid a multi-car accident as observed at the Australian Grand Prix. The stewards further warned the drivers at the Sunday morning meeting to exercise caution at the first turn.

The Grand Prix featured eleven teams of two drivers (each representing a different constructor), with no changes to the season entry list. Phoenix Finance unsuccessfully attempted to enter the Grand Prix with two 2001-spec Prost AP04 cars possibly powered by 1999-spec TWR engines with drivers Tarso Marques and Gastón Mazzacane after the FIA ruled it had not purchased Prost Grand Prix's entry. Toyota's Mika Salo had a severe case of flu, meaning Ryan Briscoe, Toyota's test driver, was on standby to replace him. However, Salo recovered in time to enter the Grand Prix. To assist the cooling of their internal components in Malaysia's hot and humid atmosphere, teams installed more apertures on their cars. Ferrari again sent two F2001B cars and opened additional vents on their sides. Ralf Schumacher drove a Williams FW24 after it was repaired after being damaged on the opening lap of the preceding Australian Grand Prix due to production constraints, forcing the decision to avoid using a year-old chassis. Renault employed a more powerful qualifying engine for the race and upgraded the rear wing, extractor profile and rear suspension components. The Jaguar team received a new engine and aerodynamic updates for their R3 cars.

== Practice ==
Two one-hour practices on Friday and two 45-minute sessions on Saturday preceded the race. The Friday practice sessions at Sepang took place shrouded by a smoky haze caused by forest fires in four Peninsular Malaysia states exacerbated by a prolonged drought in parts of Southeast Asia, threatening to significantly limit visibility of the circuit. However, practice was not affected by the haze.

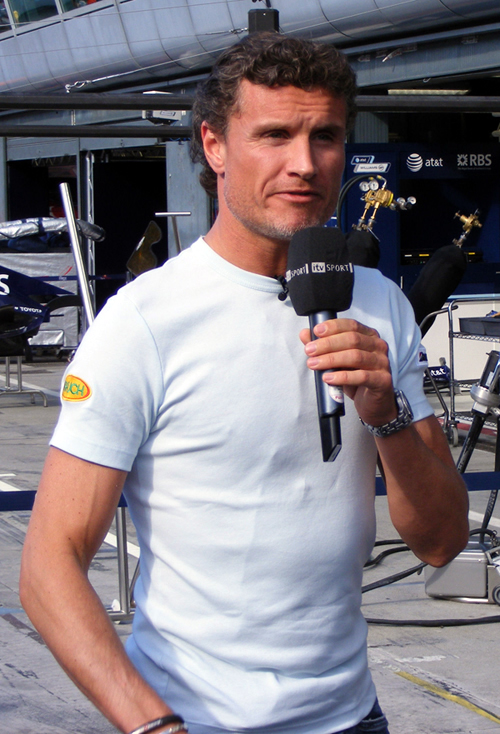
David Coulthard (pictured in 2007) had his first practice session interrupted when he stopped his McLaren with an overheating exhaust collector causing the right-rear bodywork to catch fire.

Michael Schumacher lapped fastest in the first practice session, which happened in the morning in hot and humid weather, with a time of 1:38.626, nearly a second faster than his teammate Rubens Barrichello. Sauber's Nick Heidfeld, Arrows' Enrique Bernoldi, Button, Jordan's Takuma Sato, Bernoldi's teammate Heinz-Harald Frentzen. Renault's Jarno Trulli, Jordan's Giancarlo Fisichella and Montoya followed in the top ten. Some drivers lost control of their cars as they became acclimatised to the circuit during the session. Around 20 minutes in and after completing three laps, On his first lap, David Coulthard stopped his McLaren exiting turn 11 when an overheating exhaust collector caused the right-rear bodywork to catch fire. Coulthard spent 20 minutes pushing the car back to the pit lane for repairs. Because the rules prohibited using the spare car on Fridays, his team replaced the engine before the start of the second practice. Bernoldi then stopped his car on the grass with a suspected software glitch in the diffuser.

The second practice session held later in the afternoon was also hot and humid, giving the advantage to Michelin-shod cars. McLaren's Kimi Räikkönen set the day's fastest lap of 1:37.399, Friday's only sub-1:37 lap. Coulthard was 0.639 seconds slower in second. Michael Schumacher, Ralf Schumacher, Salo, Montoya, Barrichello, Button, Trulli and Heidfeld were in positions three to ten. More drivers lost control of their cars during the session. Webber's Asiatech engine failed on his out-lap and billowed smoke in the opening minute of the session and he stopped on the track. Barrichello stopped after turn nine when his Ferrari's engine failed with 15 minutes remaining.

An overnight rainstorm left moist patches off the racing line and lowered grip levels for Saturday morning's third practice session. The forest fires' haze made it humid and overcast. Most drivers did not enter the circuit after halfway through, when more grip was available. Barrichello led with a 1:36.974 lap set late in the session. His teammate Michael Schumacher, Räikkönen, Montoya, Button, Ralf Schumacher, Coulthard, Fisichella and the Sauber duo of Felipe Massa and Heidfeld completed the top ten. Frentzen was the only driver not to set a lap time because of a fractured oil line damaging his engine.

As the circuit temperature increased, it remained hot with a slight hazy mist during the final practice session. Several drivers lost control of their cars on the damp track surface. Montoya recorded the quickest lap time of 1:36.556 27 minutes into the session. Räikkönen was second with a lap set with 16 minutes remaining. Ralf Schumacher, Barrichello, Coulthard, Michael Schumacher, Button, Fisichella, Massa and Heidfeld rounded out the top ten. Coulthard's right-hand wheels went onto the grass exiting the left-hand corner heading into turn 14. He abandoned his car in the gravel trap after spinning into it. Late in the session, a fire at the rear of Frentzen's car led him to evacuate and mechanics extinguished it.

== Qualifying ==
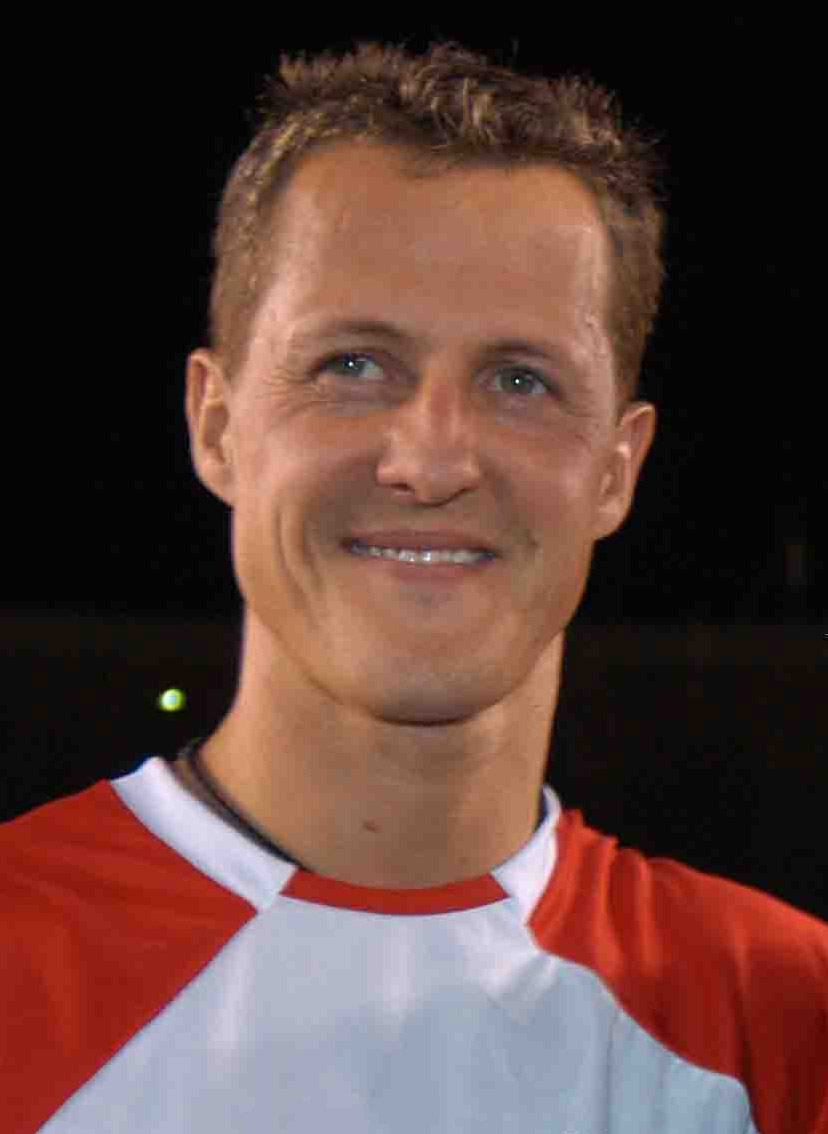
Michael Schumacher (pictured in 2005) secured the 44th pole position of his career with the fastest lap time in the one-hour qualifying session.

Each driver was allowed twelve laps during Saturday's one-hour qualifying session, with starting positions determined by the drivers' quickest laps. During this session, the 107% rule was in effect, requiring each driver to remain within 107% of the quickest lap time in order to qualify for the race. Qualifying was held in hot, humid and overcast conditions, and the high ambient and track temperatures favoured the Michelin-shod cars. Michael Schumacher used nine of his twelve allocated laps and secured his first pole position of the season and the 44th of his career with a lap time of 1:35.266. He theorised he could have lapped faster had he waited until the end of qualifying as it seemed to be the best time to avoid slower cars. Montoya qualified second, 0.231 seconds behind Michael Schumacher. He initially struggled to stay consistent all around the track and reporting understeer that cost him time between turns seven and eight. Barrichello missed the first half of qualifying, and was unable to duplicate his Australian Grand Prix qualifying performance. He took third on his final fast lap on newer tyres, creating excess understeer and braking problems initially before a car setup change resolved the issue. He demoted Ralf Schumacher to fourth when qualifying ended; Ralf Schumacher was affected by car setup issues. Räikkönen secured fifth and qualified ahead of Coulthard in sixth for the first time in their second race as teammates despite an oversteer putting him wide on his second run. An excess oversteer stopped Coulthard from attacking in the way he desired due to a lack of straightline speed, McLaren reacted by reducing downforce, affecting the handling. He ended qualifying prematurely after spinning into the turn 14 gravel trap. Heidfeld set his fastest time for seventh on his second run despite a chassis setup fault that required him to return to the original setup. Button qualified eighth on his first run, his best result since leaving Williams at the end of 2000, but suffered an engine power issue on his next run, forcing him to drive the spare Renault R202 car.

Fisichella, ninth, made driver errors on his final run, preventing him from lapping faster. Salo took tenth, Toyota's first top ten qualifying result in their second Grand Prix. Frentzen qualified 11th after being dissatisfied with the balance of his Arrows A23 car. Trulli was unable to locate a suitable car balance, leaving him in 12th. BAR's Jacques Villeneuve, 13th, was two-tenths of a second faster than in practice, reporting that the car was not quick in either the corners or straights. Massa, in 14th, experienced a front-right suspension failure midway through qualifying, forcing him to be transported to the pit lane to drive the spare Sauber car configured for him, which had more understeer than his race car. Sato admitted to pushing too hard on his second and fourth runs and qualified 15th. Bernoldi was 16th after running off onto the grass in the spare Arrows vehicle during his third run owing to a car balance issue. Jaguar's Pedro de la Rosa pushed hard on his first two runs despite an oversteer and his last run was affected by slower cars, leaving him 17th. Olivier Panis, 18th, had a gearbox oil leak that required a new gearbox, but it began to bounce out of fourth gear on his first run, forcing him to drive the spare BAR vehicle 12 minutes before qualifying concluded. On his first lap, Allan McNish had to use the spare Toyota due to a broken differential that billowed from smoke from the right exhaust. McNish was uncomfortable with how the spare car felt and he qualified 19th. Irvine finished 20th due to balance issues caused by reverting from a reworked front wing to the previous setup, resulting in driver errors. The Minardi duo of Webber and Alex Yoong completed the starting grid in 21st and 22nd; Yoong believed he might have equalled his teammate Webber, but improvements to his car proved ineffective.

=== Qualifying classification ===
Pos	No	Driver	Constructor	Lap	Gap	Grid
1	1	(Germany) Michael Schumacher	Ferrari	1:35.266	—	1
2	6	(Colombia) Juan Pablo Montoya	Williams-BMW	1:35.497	+0.231	2
3	2	(Brazil) Rubens Barrichello	Ferrari	1:35.891	+0.625	3
4	5	(Germany) Ralf Schumacher	Williams-BMW	1:36.028	+0.762	4
5	4	(Finland) Kimi Räikkönen	McLaren-Mercedes	1:36.468	+1.202	5
6	3	(United Kingdom) David Coulthard	McLaren-Mercedes	1:36.477	+1.211	6
7	7	(Germany) Nick Heidfeld	Sauber-Petronas	1:37.199	+1.933	7
8	15	(United Kingdom) Jenson Button	Renault	1:37.245	+1.979	8
9	9	(Italy) Giancarlo Fisichella	Jordan-Honda	1:37.536	+2.270	9
10	24	(Finland) Mika Salo	Toyota	1:37.694	+2.428	10
11	20	(Germany) Heinz-Harald Frentzen	Arrows-Cosworth	1:37.919	+2.653	11
12	14	(Italy) Jarno Trulli	Renault	1:37.920	+2.654	12
13	11	(Canada) Jacques Villeneuve	BAR-Honda	1:38.039	+2.773	13
14	8	(Brazil) Felipe Massa	Sauber-Petronas	1:38.057	+2.791	14
15	10	(Japan) Takuma Sato	Jordan-Honda	1:38.141	+2.875	15
16	21	(Brazil) Enrique Bernoldi	Arrows-Cosworth	1:38.284	+3.018	16
17	17	(Spain) Pedro de la Rosa	Jaguar-Cosworth	1:38.374	+3.108	17
18	12	(France) Olivier Panis	BAR-Honda	1:38.390	+3.124	18
19	25	(United Kingdom) Allan McNish	Toyota	1:38.959	+3.693	19
20	16	(United Kingdom) Eddie Irvine	Jaguar-Cosworth	1:39.121	+3.855	20
21	23	(Australia) Mark Webber	Minardi-Asiatech	1:39.454	+4.188	21
22	22	(Malaysia) Alex Yoong	Minardi-Asiatech	1:40.158	+4.892	22
107% time: 1:41.935

== Warm-up ==
On race morning, a 30-minute warm-up session was held in hot, sunny weather. Barrichello led with a lap of 1:39.611, which he set late on, ahead of teammate Michael Schumacher, Coulthard, Trulli, Heidfeld, Button, Montoya, De la Rosa, Ralf Schumacher and Frentzen in positions two to ten. Some drivers drove their team's spare cars after being permitted by the rules. They reported problems with them during their last preparations on the dry course before the race. Ralf Schumacher lost control of his car at turn 14. In the pit lane, he suffered a front disc brake failure and extinguished a brief fire in his car. Yoong caused the yellow flags to be waved when he entered the turn 12 gravel trap but returned to the pit lane.

== Race ==
The 56-lap race began at 14:00 local time under hot, partially cloudy, humid, and slightly hazy weather. The air temperature ranged from 30 to 34 °C (86 to 93 °F) and the track temperature was between 35 and 41 °C (95 and 106 °F); a 90% chance of a thunderstorm was forecast. Approximately 92,000 spectators attended the event. When the red lights went out to begin the race, Frentzen stalled on the starting grid for the second consecutive event due to a launch control system fault. His car was pushed into the pit lane by mechanics and was restarted with Frentzen a lap behind.

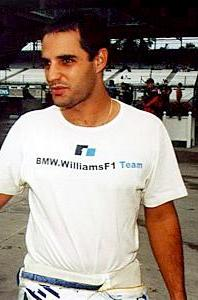
Juan Pablo Montoya was involved in a first lap collision with Michael Schumacher and was imposed the first-ever drive-through penalty for it.

At the front, Michael Schumacher went across to the right, into Montoya's path on the inside line, headed into the right-hand Selangor S turn. Montoya drew alongside Michael Schumacher on the inside due to a powerful BMW engine, and he appeared to push Schumacher to the outside kerbing entering the corner. As Montoya turned into the corner, Michael Schumacher on the tighter outside line then understeered off the kerbing, pushing Montoya to the outside. Michael Schumacher collided with Montoya, breaking his front wing against Montoya's right-front wheel and sending Montoya off the circuit. The front wing folded under Montoya's car. Montoya's horizontal fin was also removed, falling to 11th and gesticulating to Michael Schumacher as he passed him. The collision ended both drivers' chance at victory. Meanwhile, Barrichello took the race lead from Ralf Schumacher and Räikkönen. Michael Schumacher drove slowly into the pit lane for a replacement front wing in a 12.5-second pit stop. He rejoined the circuit in 21st.

Sato, on a lighter fuel load, collided with the rear of his teammate Fisichella car at turn two on lap two while they were battling Salo for eighth position. The impact severed Sato's front wing and Fisichella's rear wing. Both drivers made pit stops for repairs on the same lap, with Fisichella overshooting the Jordan pit stall because his rear wing took longer to install. Fisichella exited his car, assuming the damage was irreversible, but after installing the rear wing, he rejoined the Grand Prix. Barrichello slowly pulled away from Ralf Schumacher. Montoya advanced to seventh by overtaking Salo and Trulli on lap three, before Salo passed Trulli for eighth on lap four. McNish passed Bernoldi for tenth place on lap six. On the following lap, Montoya slipstreamed past Button on the inside into turn one for sixth.

The stewards perceived Montoya to be at fault for the collision with Michael Schumacher. They imposed a drive-through penalty on Montoya on lap eight for "causing an avoidable collision," the first time such a penalty had been levied on a Formula One driver since the FIA introduced it to replace the ten-second stop-and-go penalties. He took the penalty two laps later and fell to ninth, losing approximately 20 seconds. Trulli entered the pit lane on lap ten with overheating. The sidepods were cleared, but the car continued to overheat and lose power. He was pushed into the garage and retired to prevent more damage to the Renault. Panis pulled over onto the grass after his clutch failed, forcing him to retire on the same lap. By lap 13, Michael Schumacher had moved to 12th place after passing Irvine and Villeneuve. Coulthard began slowing due to a worsening misfire, causing his engine to run on nine cylinders on the same lap, and he was passed by Heidfeld on the pit lane straight the next lap for fourth. He then dropped behind Button and Salo before being summoned to the garage by Mercedes technicians to retire on lap 15. Meanwhile, Michael Schumacher passed Massa for 11th place before battling Bernoldi for tenth, overtaking him two laps later.

The first round of pit stops commenced on lap 20. Ralf Schumacher ran a one-stop plan whereas Barrichello was on a two-stop strategy. Heidfeld and Michael Schumacher made their first pit stops for fuel and tyres. Barrichello made his first pit stop from the lead at the conclusion of the next lap. The stop lasted 6.6 seconds because his team were short filling him and he rejoined the race in third, behind Räikkönen. Bernoldi stopped on the circuit at turn nine with a fuel pick-up issue that forced him to retire on lap 22. This prompted the waving of yellow flags, as marshals moved Bernoldi's car off the track. Barrichello was chasing Räikkönen for second place when Räikkönen's engine failed, sending smoke billowing from the back of his McLaren as he braked for the final turn on lap 25. Räikkönen entered the garage and retired. This promoted the yet-to-stop Button to third.

Michael Schumacher regained a points-paying place on lap 27 after Salo entered the garage to address an electrical fault with the traction control system following his first pit stop. Montoya overtook Heidfeld for fourth on that lap. Irvine collided with Yoong's rear on lap 28 while attempting to lap him. Irvine's front wing folded under the Jaguar and he ran onto the grass before entering the pit lane for a replacement front wing. Ralf Schumacher made his only pit stop of the event on lap 31. The 11-second stop saw scrubbed tyres installed onto his car, falling to second behind Barrichello. One lap later, Yoong retired at the side of the track, having lost the use of three gears. Lap 33 saw Irvine enter the garage to retire with a loss in hydraulic pressure preventing him from engaging the clutch.

Barrichello made his second pit stop for fuel and tyres on lap 35. The stop lasted 10.6 seconds and Ralf Schumacher returned to the lead. Michael Schumacher slipstreamed past Heidfeld the outside entering turn one for fifth on the next lap. On lap 37, Webber spun into the gravel trap because of a technical issue unrelated to the engine and retired. Heidfeld made his second pit stop from fifth on that lap, rejoining the track in sixth. Michael Schumacher overtook Button braking for the final turn on lap 38. Montoya set a new race lap record and the race's fastest lap of 1:38.049 on that lap before his second pit stop to end lap 39. The stop lasted 7.8 seconds and he fell to fourth, behind Button. Barrichello was running second when he pulled over to the side of the track with smoke billowing from his engine on lap 40. Two laps later, Michael Schumacher made his third and final pit stop, dropping to fourth.

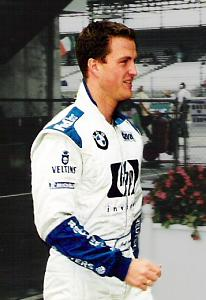
Ralf Schumacher secured the fourth victory of his career by 39.7 seconds over his teammate Montoya in the first one-two finish for Williams since 1996.

After all scheduled pit stops were completed, Ralf Schumacher led by about 50 seconds from Button in second, who was followed by Montoya, Michael Schumacher, Heidfeld, and Massa. The focus shifted to Button and Montoya's duel for second. Montoya closed up to Button due to his powerful BMW engine and Button began defending second. On lap 44, Montoya attempted to pass at the end of the pit lane straight for second, but Button held on by keeping on the outside through the first two turns. He tried again at the entry to turn three and was successful this time. As Ralf Schumacher was more than 40 seconds ahead of his teammate Montoya and Button 16.9 seconds ahead of Michael Schumacher, the Williams drivers were conservative, and Ferrari's streak of 37 consecutive podium finishes appeared to be over. However, with two laps remaining, Button suffered a sudden suspected anti-roll bar bracket failure, forcing him to slow since the car was cornering on three wheels and the weight transferred uncontrollably across the axles. This cost Button 14 seconds over the final two laps, and Michael Schumacher overtook him for third on braking at turn four on the final lap, preventing Button from clinching his first podium.

Ralf Schumacher was unaffected by mechanical issues and other drivers' battles; he led the rest of the race, securing his fourth career victory and first since the 2001 German Grand Prix. Montoya finished second, 39.700 seconds behind, helping Williams to its first one-two result since the 1996 Portuguese Grand Prix. Michael Schumacher took the final podium result in third. Button secured fourth position and was the final driver on the lead lap. Heidfeld finished fifth and Massa completed the points-scorers in sixth, Massa earning his maiden championship point. McNish finished seventh when the Toyota pit crew mixed up his final set of tyres and used a set of worn tyres instead. Villeneuve finished eighth owing to a lack of grip and steering issues. Sato was ninth, registering his first Formula One finish. De la Rosa (after his front wing was removed in a collision with Panis while battling for 14th position early in the race), Frentzen, Salo and Fisichella were the final four finishers. A total of 13 out of the 22 starters finished the Grand Prix, and nine drivers did not finish.

=== Post-race ===
The top three drivers appeared on the podium to collect their trophies and spoke to the media in the subsequent press conference. Ralf Schumacher described the Grand Prix as "almost the perfect race" but admitted to being "certainly a bit lucky" when his teammate Montoya and Michael Schumacher collided on the opening lap. Montoya said that finishing in second was "pretty good" considering his start to the race but thought he was slightly unlucky, adding, "After the start, I thought my race was over. I will try to push and try to get one or two points and here I am with six. It's pretty good." Michael Schumacher commented on his third-place result, "All you can say is that we came with the old car to the first two races and we weren't expecting to have 14 points in our account, plus what happened today, to get four points, so that's pretty much fine. I'm quite happy and relaxed with that situation and not too unhappy."

After the race, the decision to penalise Montoya for his first-lap collision with Michael Schumacher sparked discussion. Montoya chastised the stewards for overreacting to criticism following the multi-car accident at the start of the preceding Australian Grand Prix, and downplayed the Malaysian crash as "a racing incident". He also said that he thought the penalty was "very unfair" and that he gave Michael Schumacher some space. Michael Schumacher felt that if Montoya had opened up more, there would have been no collision, but he thought the penalty issued by Montoya was "harsh", citing past situations that were more dangerous in which no action was taken. Ralf Schumacher also felt that it was unfair to penalise his teammate. According to Williams technical director Patrick Head, Montoya was half a car length ahead of Michael Schumacher and thought the penalty was slightly severe. Ferrari technical director Ross Brawn argued Michael Schumacher had been given no space.

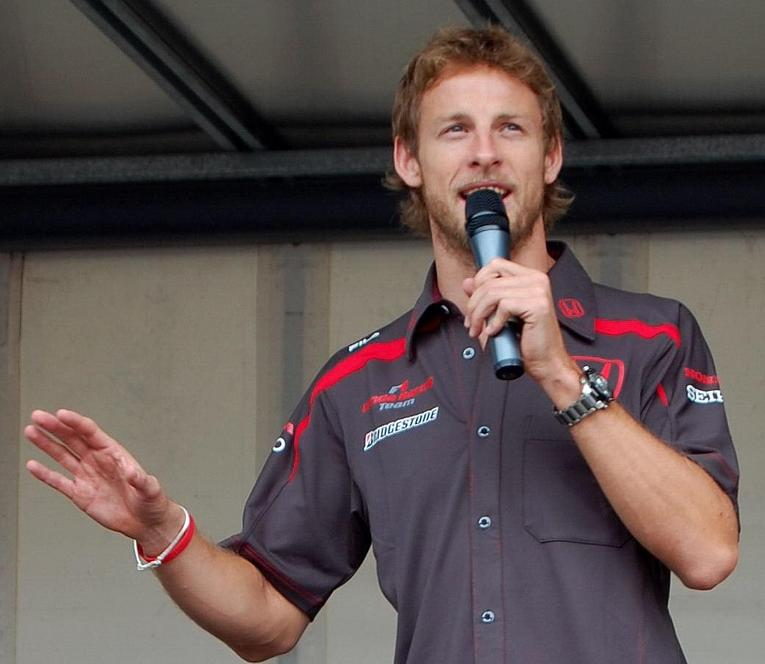
Jenson Button (pictured in 2007) was on course to achieve his first podium result until a suspected anti-roll bar bracket failure slowed him two laps from the end of the race.

Button said had he been running fourth throughout the race, finishing fourth would have been satisfactory but that him losing a podium result was "very hard to take." Heidfeld said finishing fifth was a positive result for Sauber after being eliminated in the pileup in Australia. Massa was delighted to score his first championship point in his second Grand Prix start, saying, I thought if I finished I could score a point, and though this circuit was very difficult in the circumstances today, that's how it worked out." Sato apologised to his teammate Fisichella for their collision on the second lap. Fisichella accepted his teammate's apology and Jordan team owner Eddie Jordan praised the maturity of both drivers following the incident. Sato suggested the accident happened because Jordan had implemented a pre-race agreement to let him past Fisichella when behind his teammate since he had a lighter fuelled car, something confirmed by Jordan technical director Gary Anderson. McNish did not believe Toyota made a rookie mistake in providing the wrong tyres for his car during his final pit stop, attributing it to his teammate Salo's surprise early pit stop.

Coulthard was disappointed to retire from the race but urged McLaren to remain focused, "I know we have a package which is capable of winning races, but we just need a bit of reliability." Mercedes-Benz motorsport head Norbert Haug said the manufacturer would thoroughly analyse the reason for the engine failures to prevent them from reoccurring. The result reduced Michael Schumacher's World Drivers' Championship lead to two points over Montoya; Ralf Schumacher's victory moved him to third place. With 15 races remaining in the season, Williams took the lead in the World Constructors' Championship, eight points ahead of Ferrari.

=== Race classification ===
Drivers who scored championship points are denoted in bold.

Pos	No	Driver	Constructor	Tyre	Laps	Time/Retired	Grid	Points
1	5	(Germany) **Ralf Schumacher**	**Williams-BMW**	M	56	1:34:12.912	4	10
2	6	(Colombia) **Juan Pablo Montoya**	**Williams-BMW**	M	56	+39.700	2	6
3	1	(Germany) **Michael Schumacher**	**Ferrari**	B	56	+1:01.795	1	4
4	15	(United Kingdom) **Jenson Button**	**Renault**	M	56	+1:09.767	8	3
5	7	(Germany) **Nick Heidfeld**	**Sauber-Petronas**	B	55	+1 lap	7	2
6	8	(Brazil) **Felipe Massa**	**Sauber-Petronas**	B	55	+1 lap	14	1
7	25	(United Kingdom) Allan McNish	Toyota	M	55	+1 lap	19	
8	11	(Canada) Jacques Villeneuve	BAR-Honda	B	55	+1 lap	13	
9	10	(Japan) Takuma Sato	Jordan-Honda	B	54	+2 laps	15	
10	17	(Spain) Pedro de la Rosa	Jaguar-Cosworth	M	54	+2 laps	17	
11	20	(Germany) Heinz-Harald Frentzen	Arrows-Cosworth	B	54	+2 laps	11	
12	24	(Finland) Mika Salo	Toyota	M	53	+3 laps	10	
13	9	(Italy) Giancarlo Fisichella	Jordan-Honda	B	53	+3 laps	9	
Ret	2	(Brazil) Rubens Barrichello	Ferrari	B	39	Engine	3	
Ret	23	(Australia) Mark Webber	Minardi-Asiatech	M	34	Electrical	21	
Ret	16	(United Kingdom) Eddie Irvine	Jaguar-Cosworth	M	30	Hydraulics	20	
Ret	22	(Malaysia) Alex Yoong	Minardi-Asiatech	M	29	Gearbox	22	
Ret	4	(Finland) Kimi Räikkönen	McLaren-Mercedes	M	24	Engine	5	
Ret	21	(Brazil) Enrique Bernoldi	Arrows-Cosworth	B	20	Fuel pressure	16	
Ret	3	(United Kingdom) David Coulthard	McLaren-Mercedes	M	15	Engine	6	
Ret	12	(France) Olivier Panis	BAR-Honda	B	9	Clutch	18	
Ret	14	(Italy) Jarno Trulli	Renault	M	9	Overheating	12	

== Championship standings after the race ==
Drivers' Championship standings

+/–	Pos	Driver	Points
	1	(Germany) Michael Schumacher	14
	2	(Colombia) Juan Pablo Montoya	12
7	3	(Germany) Ralf Schumacher	10
1	4	(Finland) Kimi Räikkönen	4
1	5	(United Kingdom) Eddie Irvine	3

Constructors' Championship standings

+/–	Pos	Constructor	Points
1	1	(United Kingdom) Williams-BMW	22
1	2	(Italy) Ferrari	14
	3	(United Kingdom) McLaren-Mercedes	4
	4	(United Kingdom) Jaguar-Cosworth	3
2	5	(France) Renault	3

Note: Only the top five positions are included for both sets of standings.

Previous race: 2002 Australian Grand Prix	FIA Formula One World Championship; 2002 season	Next race: 2002 Brazilian Grand Prix
Previous race: 2001 Malaysian Grand Prix	Malaysian Grand Prix	Next race: 2003 Malaysian Grand Prix
