= 2002 Hungarian Grand Prix =

Formula One motor race

Race 13 of 17 in the 2002 Formula One World Championship
← Previous race	Next race →

Race details
- Date: 18 August 2002
- Official name: Marlboro Magyar Nagydíj 2002
- Location: Hungaroring, Mogyoród, Pest, Hungary
- Course: Permanent racing facility
- Course length: 3.975 km (2.470 miles)
- Distance: 77 laps, 306.075 km (190.186 miles)
- Weather: Partially cloudy, hot and sunny, Air Temp: 28 °C (82 °F)

Pole position
Driver	(Brazil) Rubens Barrichello	Ferrari
- Time: 1:13.333

Fastest lap
Driver	(Germany) Michael Schumacher	Ferrari
- Time: 1:16.207 on lap 72 (lap record)

Podium
First	(Brazil) Rubens Barrichello	Ferrari
Second	(Germany) Michael Schumacher	Ferrari
Third	(Germany) Ralf Schumacher	Williams-BMW

The 2002 Hungarian Grand Prix (formally the Marlboro Magyar Nagydíj 2002) was a Formula One motor race held before 65,000 spectators at the Hungaroring, Mogyoród, Pest, Hungary on 18 August 2002. It was the 13th round of 17 in the 2002 Formula One World Championship and the 17th Hungarian Grand Prix as part of the Formula One World Championship. Ferrari driver Rubens Barrichello won the 77-lap race from pole position. His teammate Michael Schumacher finished in second and Williams's Ralf Schumacher was third.

Entering the race, only Ferrari and Williams were in contention for the World Constructors' Championship with Ferrari leading by 65 championship points. Barrichello qualified on pole position by setting the fastest lap time in the one-hour qualifying session. His teammate Michael Schumacher, the World Drivers' Champion, started from second with Ralf Schumacher third. Barrichello led entering the first corner and maintained the lead for most of the race, except for one lap during the first round of pit stops, leading to Ferrari's one-two finish. It was Barrichello's second victory of the season and the third of his career.

In the week of the Grand Prix, the Arrows team continued to be affected by financial trouble and were advised to miss the race, leaving the sport with 10 entered teams and 20 drivers. Ferrari's one-two finish sealed the team's fourth consecutive World Constructors' Championship with Williams unable to pass Ferrari's championship points total in the remaining four races. Barrichello's victory moved him from fourth to second in the World Drivers' Championship.

== Background ==
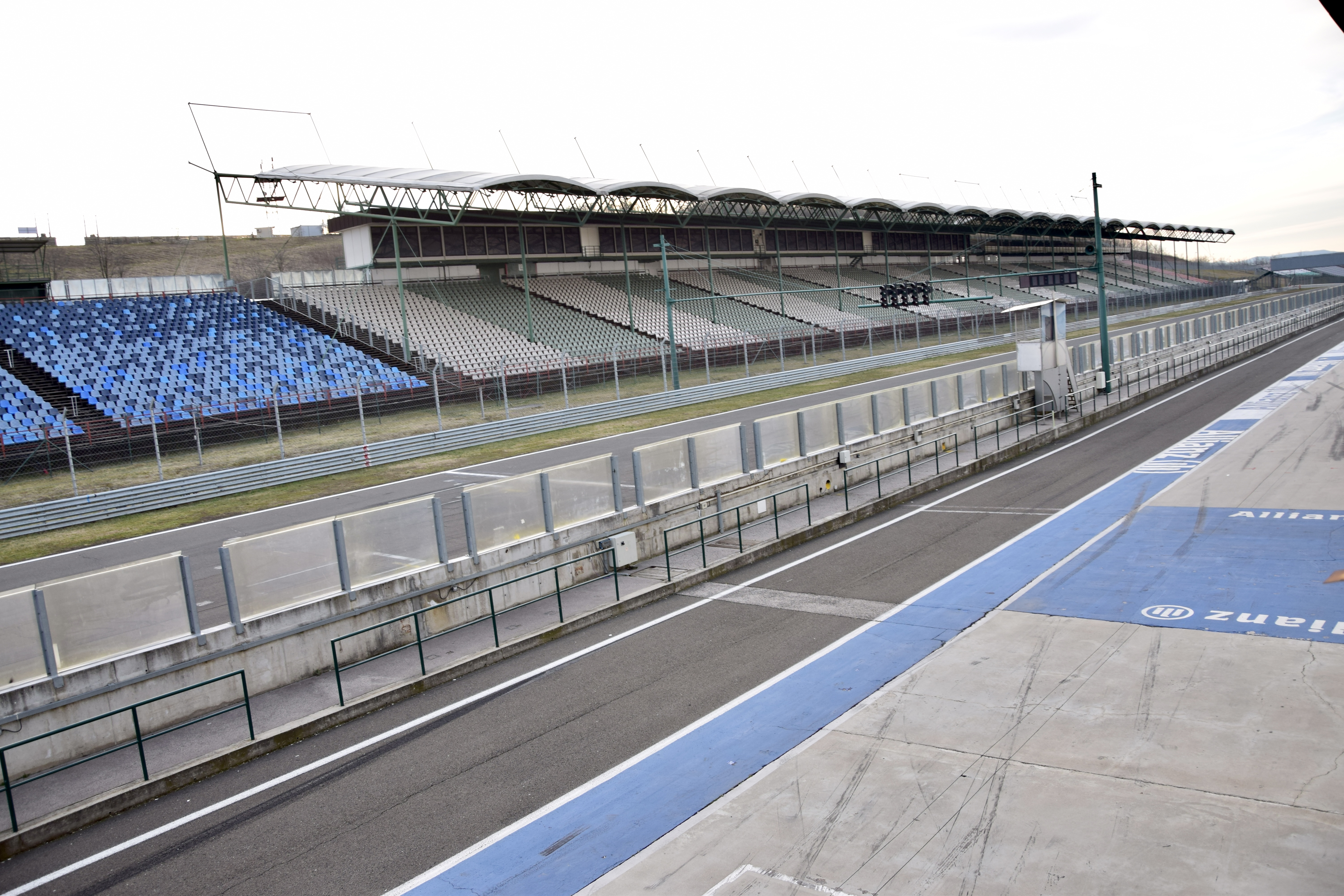
The Hungaroring (pictured in 2015), where the Hungarian Grand Prix was held

The 2002 Hungarian Grand Prix was the 13th of 17 races of the 2002 Formula One World Championship and the event's 17th running since its first Formula One race in 1986. It took place over 77 laps at the 16-turn 3.975 km (2.470 mi) Hungaroring in Mogyoród, Pest, Hungary on 18 August. Going into the event, Ferrari's Michael Schumacher had already won the season's World Drivers' Championship, having taken the title two races earlier at the French Grand Prix. Michael Schumacher led the championship with 106 championship points, ahead of Williams driver Juan Pablo Montoya with 40 championship points. Although the World Drivers' Championship was decided, the World Constructors' Championship was not. Ferrari led with 141 championship points while Williams were second with 76 championship points and McLaren were third on 49 championship points. Ferrari could win their fourth consecutive World Constructors' Championship if they outscored Williams by more than one championship point.

Michael Schumacher won nine of the season's 12 races. With five rounds still to run, Michael Schumacher stated he was looking forward to the final races and that his goal of winning as many Grand Prix as possible had not changed. He added he was "really looking forward" to the Hungarian Grand Prix, and could drive the rest of the season unpressured. Barrichello, who was involved in a four-way battle for second in the championship, said being the runner-up would be a plus, "Fighting for second right now and having all the support of the team to be able to do that, is good. I would welcome it." Williams's Ralf Schumacher stated that the motivation was to close the gap with Ferrari before the season ended rather than to finish second in the championship. Nonetheless, he thought the race would demonstrate Williams' future strength.

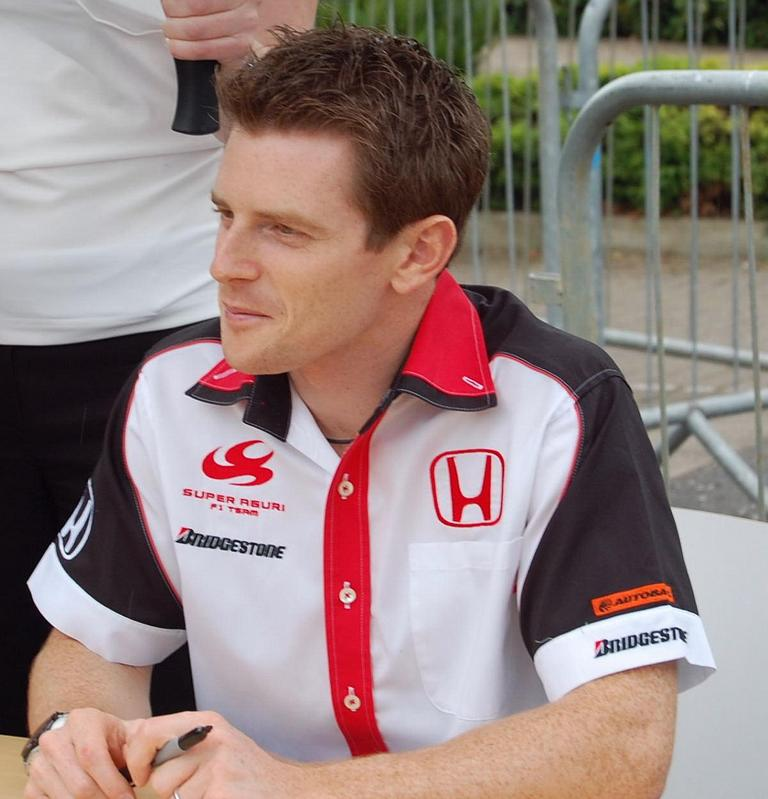
Anthony Davidson (pictured in 2007) made his Formula One debut in place of Alex Yoong at Minardi.

Ten constructors represented by a racing team entered two drivers each for the Grand Prix. The Arrows squad was in talks about possible investment into the team to help them overcome their financial troubles, with owner Tom Walkinshaw negotiating with shareholders Morgan Grenfell to allow this. The team was thus instructed to skip the Hungarian Grand Prix but faced possible sanctions by the Fédération Internationale de l'Automobile (FIA; Formula One's administrative body) for violating the Concorde Agreement. Minardi team owner Paul Stoddart replaced regular driver Alex Yoong with Anthony Davidson, British American Racing's (BAR) test driver, on a two-race contract after Yoong failed to qualify for three Grands Prix and was put through a rigorous testing program to help improve his qualifying performances. The team had planned to sign Justin Wilson, the 2001 International Formula 3000 champion, but Wilson was too tall to fit into the PS02 car in accordance with FIA safety requirements that require drivers to exit their cars within five seconds of an emergency during a seat fitting at the team headquarters in Faenza, Italy.

There was a three-week break following the preceding German Grand Prix, and no in-season testing was permitted per team agreement, though Ferrari shookdown their three F2002 cars with test driver Luca Badoer at Italy's Fiorano Circuit and some other teams used straight-line test tracks to confirm wind tunnel data. Teams concentrated on heat dissipation, a major issue at the Hungaroring because of the hot temperatures and the start/finish straight. Ferrari brought traction control system updates while McLaren delayed the debut of the revised version of the rear axle, already tested heavily by their test driver Alexander Wurz. BAR fitted a new front wing, the final component in the 004 car's aerodynamic upgrade, which was overseen by technical director Geoff Willis. Renault introduced a new qualifying engine and a new rear wing.

== Practice ==
Two one-hour practice sessions on Friday and two 45-minute sessions on Saturday preceded the race. Despite rainfall, the first practice session on Friday morning was held on a dry circuit. Michael Schumacher set the fastest lap time of 1:16.755 with two minutes remaining. His teammate Barrichello, Sauber's Felipe Massa, BAR's Jacques Villeneuve, Jordan's Giancarlo Fisichella, Villeneuve's teammate Olivier Panis, McLaren's Kimi Räikkönen, Massa's teammate Nick Heidfeld, Räikkönen's teammate David Coulthard and Ralf Schumacher followed in the top ten. The track was slippery, with some drivers going off the circuit. With two minutes left, Massa lost control of his car's rear into the turn six chicane and became stuck in the gravel trap. Davidson's driveshaft failed, causing his rear wheels to lock and spin at turn six.

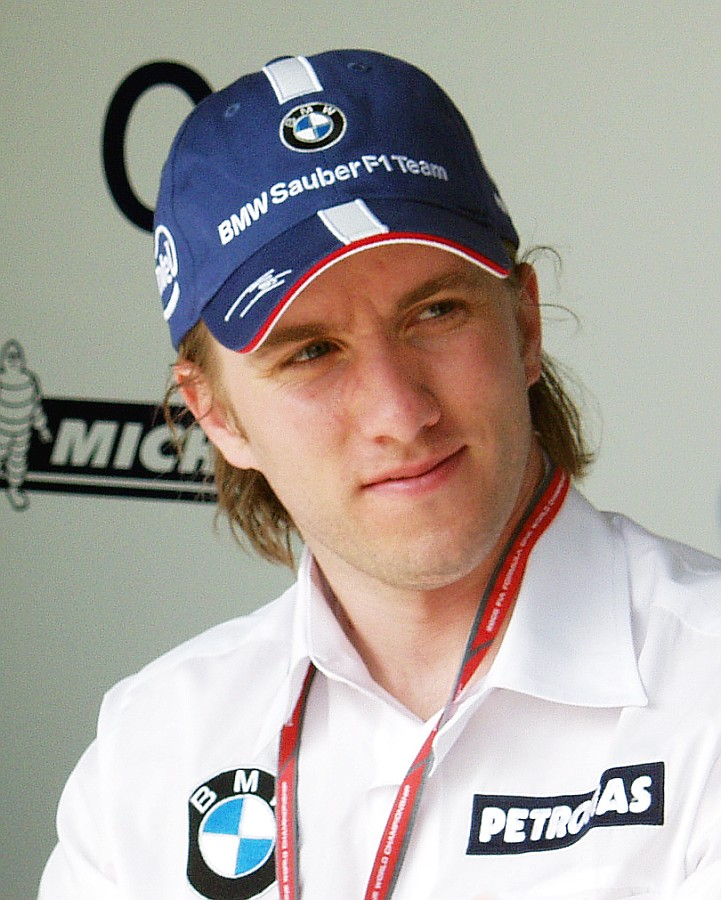
Nick Heidfeld (pictured in 2006) crashed his Sauber car into the Armco barrier in the second free practice session.

During the second practice session that afternoon, it was cloudy and light rain fell on the track halfway through the session but not enough to wet the racing surface. Michael Schumacher lowered his lap time to 1:16.346 as track conditions improved to stay fastest. Positions two to ten were occupied by his teammate Barrichello, Ralf Schumacher, Räikkönen, the Jordan pair of Fisichella and Takuma Sato, Coulthard, Massa, Jaguar's Pedro de la Rosa and Renault's Jenson Button. Several drivers spun during the session. Villeneuve threw gravel into the track and Coulthard spun. He struck a high-mounted kerb, splitting the McLaren's left-rear tyre off the rim and the engine overheated when he restarted to return slowly to the pit lane. He blocked De la Rosa, who damaged his nose cone entering the pit lane. The cooling system was topped up, allowing Coulthard to continue driving. Heidfeld's left-rear tyre clouted the turn four kerb, losing control of his car's rear at the exit of the fast left-hand corner. He spun into the Armco barrier on the opposite side of the track, prematurely ending his session. Montoya got stuck in the turn nine gravel trap in the final minute. Massa was pushing hard when he collided with the turn four barrier, removing the rear wing.

Heavy rain fell overnight, removing the rubber and dust from the racing surface, resulting in the removal of grip. Teams preferred to wait when more rubber (grip) was laid on the track in the third practice session on Saturday morning. In dry conditions, Michael Schumacher was two seconds faster than his previous day's best time at 1:14.329, the only driver to lap within the 1:14 range. His teammate Barrichello, Panis, Massa, Fisichella, Räikkönen, Heidfeld, Villeneuve, Button and Coulthard rounded out the top ten. The circuit's low grip caused several drivers to go off. At the session's conclusion, Button lost control of his Renault's rear at turn 11 and the right-front hit the tyre barrier.

The final practice session held on Saturday morning was held in dry and light cloudy weather. Unlike the preceding three sessions, fewer drivers ran off the circuit. Michael Schumacher's lap time increased slightly from the previous session to a 1:14.308, ahead of his teammate Barrichello, Räikkönen, Montoya, Massa, Panis, Fisichella, Ralf Schumacher, Heidfeld and Renault's Jarno Trulli in positions two to ten. Fisichella almost hit the turn two outside tyre wall but continued without damage to his car after going through the gravel trap.

== Qualifying ==
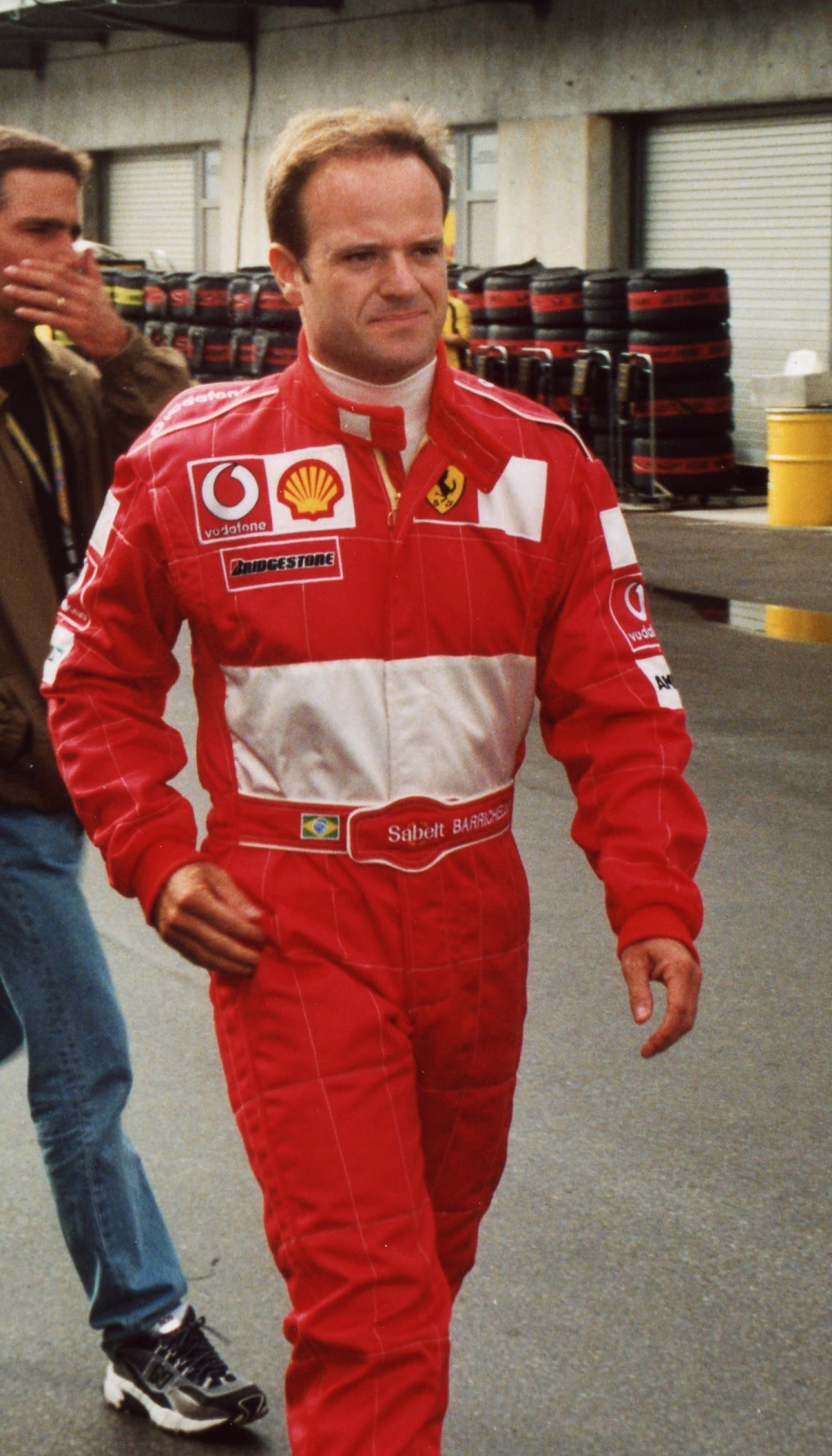
Rubens Barrichello qualified on pole position for the third time in the season and went on to win the race the following lap, leading all but one lap

Each driver was allowed twelve laps during Saturday's one-hour qualifying session, with starting positions determined by the drivers' quickest laps. During this session, the 107% rule was in effect, requiring each driver to remain within 107% of the quickest lap time in order to qualify for the race. Conditions for qualifying were fine, hot and sunny, and track temperatures gradually increased. Between sessions, dust was blown onto the track, causing drivers to wait for one another to enter the circuit to clean the racing line. Barrichello took his third pole position of the season and sixth of his career with a time of 1:13:333 on his final qualifying run. His first run was halted when Button spun his Renault in front of him at turn 11. His teammate Michael Schumacher was 0.059 seconds slower in second, qualifying ahead of him for the fourth time in the season after Schumacher made an minor mistake at turn 12. He took three of his four runs, saving a pair of tyres for the race. Williams occupied the grid's second row. Ralf Schumacher was second early on, and took third after a minor racing setup adjustment backfired and sent him off the circuit on his third run. Montoya was fourth, almost a second slower than his teammate, for the second consecutive race. He drove an imbalanced car that understeered despite the setup changes. Jordan achieved their best qualifying result of the season with Fisichella in fifth. Fisichella spun after losing control of his car's rear at the penultimate turn but recovered to the pit lane. Trulli took sixth with his fastest lap late in qualifying, having gradually improved his Renault during the session. Sauber's Massa and Heidfeld were seventh and eighth respectively. Massa had excess oversteer on his second and third runs, which he corrected by switching to scrubbed front tyres and new rear tyres for his final run. Heidfeld had excess understeer on his second and third runs; a setup tweak on his last run moved him from 15th to eighth.

Button was fourth early on but failed to improve his lap, dropping to ninth. With less than 30 minutes remaining, he spun 360 degrees, obstructing three drivers. In McLaren's worst qualifying since the 1997 Argentine Grand Prix, Coulthard and Räikkönen were 10th and 11th due to a lack of grip and pace. Coulthard, in his worst qualifying performance of the season, Coulthard stated that changes to remove understeer resulted in additional understeer. Räikkönen was hampered by traffic on his fastest lap and made a mistake on a run. Panis in 12th had a gearshift issue that was fixed for his final run and was delayed by traffic. Villeneuve's car had a loose undertray, which was discovered at the end of free practice, therefore BAR did not have his car ready for qualifying. He qualified 13th after spinning at turn five when Sato slowed him in a corner but recovered to the pit lane. Sato, 14th, was delayed by Button's spin ahead of him on his first run and drove the spare Jordan car on his third run due to an oil leak emitting smoke from his race car. On Sato's last run, the spare Jordan car developed brake and gearbox issues. De la Rosa qualified 15th, ahead of teammate Eddie Irvine in 16th, due to a lack of grip. De la Rosa was only able to complete one clean run due to traffic, but Irvine's car had several issues and he was baulked by at least three drivers. The Toyota pair of Mika Salo and Allan McNish secured 17th and 18th. Salo lacked downforce and grip while McNish's car balance issues led to further understeer on each run after losing three-tenths of a second towards the end of his first quick lap. Minardi's Mark Webber in 19th and his teammate Davidson in 20th completed the starting order. Webber felt he had exploited the most out of his car. Davidson set his quickest lap on his second run, but ran wide on his third and his last run was hampered by traffic.

=== Qualifying classification ===
Pos	No	Driver	Constructor	Lap	Gap	Grid
1	2	(Brazil) Rubens Barrichello	Ferrari	1:13.333	—	1
2	1	(Germany) Michael Schumacher	Ferrari	1:13.392	+0.059	2
3	5	(Germany) Ralf Schumacher	Williams-BMW	1:13.746	+0.413	3
4	6	(Colombia) Juan Pablo Montoya	Williams-BMW	1:14.706	+1.373	4
5	9	(Italy) Giancarlo Fisichella	Jordan-Honda	1:14.880	+1.547	5
6	14	(Italy) Jarno Trulli	Renault	1:14.980	+1.647	6
7	8	(Brazil) Felipe Massa	Sauber-Petronas	1:15.047	+1.714	7
8	7	(Germany) Nick Heidfeld	Sauber-Petronas	1:15.129	+1.796	8
9	15	(United Kingdom) Jenson Button	Renault	1:15.214	+1.881	9
10	3	(United Kingdom) David Coulthard	McLaren-Mercedes	1:15.223	+1.890	10
11	4	(Finland) Kimi Räikkönen	McLaren-Mercedes	1:15.243	+1.910	11
12	12	(France) Olivier Panis	BAR-Honda	1:15.556	+2.223	12
13	11	(Canada) Jacques Villeneuve	BAR-Honda	1:15.583	+2.250	13
14	10	(Japan) Takuma Sato	Jordan-Honda	1:15.804	+2.471	14
15	17	(Spain) Pedro de la Rosa	Jaguar-Cosworth	1:15.867	+2.534	15
16	16	(United Kingdom) Eddie Irvine	Jaguar-Cosworth	1:16.419	+3.086	16
17	24	(Finland) Mika Salo	Toyota	1:16.473	+3.140	17
18	25	(United Kingdom) Allan McNish	Toyota	1:16.626	+3.293	18
19	23	(Australia) Mark Webber	Minardi-Asiatech	1:17.428	+4.095	19
20	22	(United Kingdom) Anthony Davidson	Minardi-Asiatech	1:17.959	+4.626	20
107% time: 1:18.466

== Warm-up ==
On race morning, a half-hour warm-up session was held in hot and sunny weather. Drivers did installation laps in their race and spare cars. Michael Schumacher lapped fastest with a time of 1:16.864 just before warm-up concluded. His teammate Barrichello, Räikkönen, Fisichella, Sato, Ralf Schumacher, Heidfeld, Coulthard, Massa and Button followed in the top ten. A lack of grip appeared to be less problematic than in the preceding sessions. With three minutes left, Barrichello snatched the front-left brake at the turn 13 hairpin behind the pit lane and spun rear-first into the gravel trap, where he abandoned the Ferrari. Michael Schumacher missed 18 minutes while adjusting the engine electronics mapping. Sato ran off the circuit but avoided hitting the wall, while Salo had an oil leak in his Toyota.

== Race ==
The 77-lap race commenced at 14:00 local time. Although there were forecasts for clouds, it was dry, hot and sunny for the race. The air temperature was between 29 and 33 °C (84 and 91 °F) and the asphalt temperature was between 30 and 46 °C (86 and 115 °F). The race drew 65,000 people, almost 40% fewer than the previous year's event. Teams installed additional cooling precautions to keep the drivers and engines cool. When the red lights went out to begin the race, Barrichello made a brisk start on the track's clean side and held the lead into the first turn. His teammate Michael Schumacher was on the dirtier side but held off the fast-starting Ralf Schumacher on the outside to keep second. Montoya made a slow getaway from fourth, losing to Fisichella and Massa on the inside. Despite hitting wheels at the exit to turn two, Button passed Montoya for sixth. Although Montoya's car suffered damage, causing some understeer, both drivers were able to continue. Panis had the worst start as he drove onto the dirt after duelling Sato, falling from 12th to 19th by the conclusion of lap one, while Trulli lost three positions in the same distance.

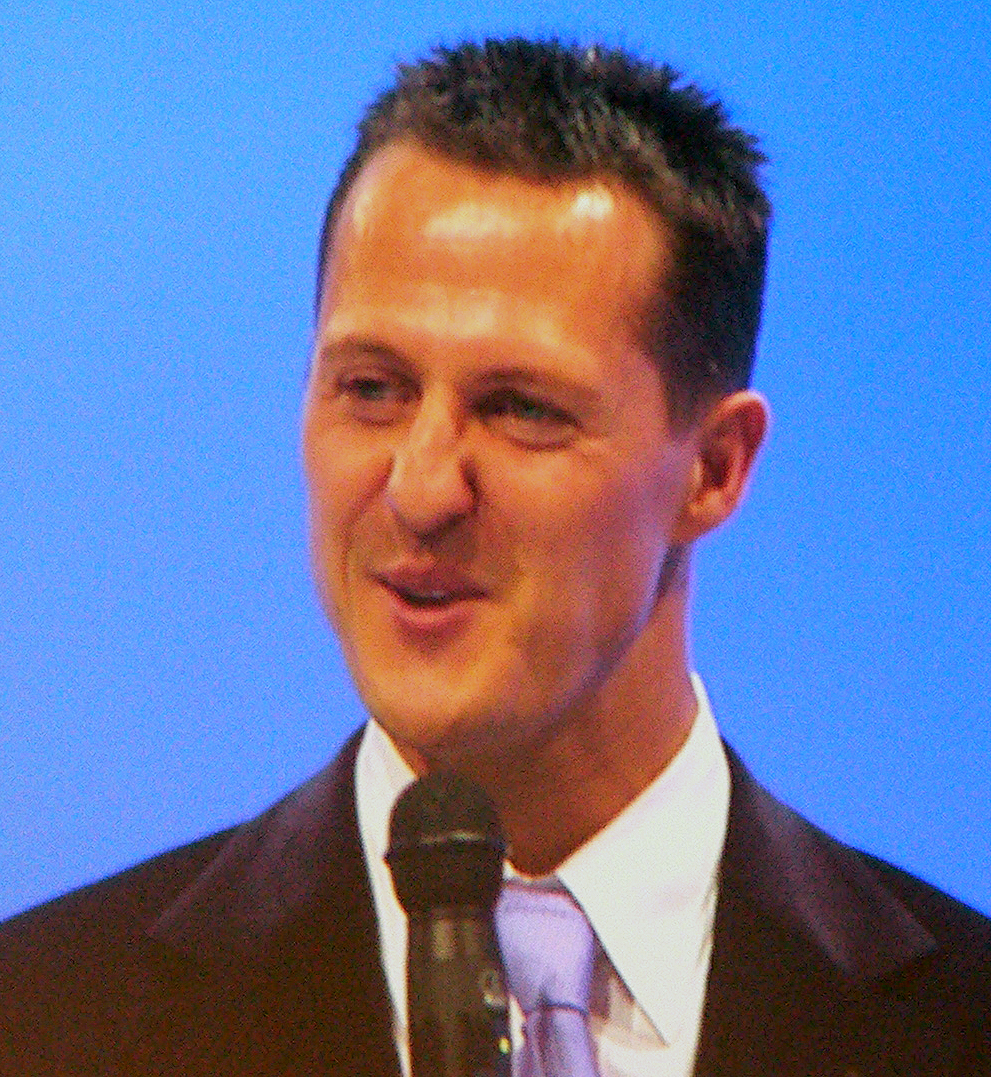
Michael Schumacher (pictured in 2007) finished in second, helping Ferrari to secure its fourth consecutive World Constructors' Championship.

At the end of the first lap, Barrichello led teammate Michael Schumacher by half-a-second, followed by Ralf Schumacher, Fisichella, Massa and Button. On lap two, Coulthard braked later than Heidfeld, passing him for tenth into the first turn. During the first ten laps, the two Ferrari drivers broke away from the field, lapping about a second faster per lap. Ralf Schumacher was more than ten seconds behind Ferrari at the end of lap ten, but he was seven seconds ahead of fourth-placed Fisichella. Because overtaking was difficult on a debris and dust-covered course, there were no position changes until lap 21, when the race's first retirement occurred. Villeneuve stopped at the pit lane exit at the end of the pit lane straight when the transmission seized up. Räikkönen was pressuring Montoya, who was driving an ill-handling car against a faster McLaren. On lap 22, Montoya drove wide over the turn 11 kerbing, causing additional damage to the bargeboards and sidepod fins and part of the air deflector behind the left front wheel. The removal of left-hand side aerodynamic components imbalanced Montoya's car. Räikkönen moved to the outside at turn two, giving him the inside line for turn three. Montoya fought back but Räikkönen drove through on the inside of turn three. Montoya ran wide off the track and onto the grass to avoid a collision, dropping to tenth.

The carbon fibre removal meant he made an unscheduled pit stop. During the 9.2-second stop for fuel and tyres, Williams' mechanics removed the loose bodywork off his car. Montoya rejoined the track in 18th, ahead of Davidson. On lap 25, Irvine drove onto the turn two escape road to retire with a misfiring engine. Montoya ran wide at turn four owing to understeer on that lap but continued, running slower than before his pit stop. Further ahead, Räikkönen was able to close in on Button without being hampered by Montoya, battling him. On lap 30, Fisichella entered pit lane and the race leaders made their first pit stops. His stop lasted 8.3 seconds and he fell to ninth, ahead of Heidfeld. Michael Schumacher made his first pit stop on lap 31 and dropped to third behind Ralf Schumacher. On the following lap, after lapping Davidson and being distracted by him, Button ran too far to the right and possibly ran onto dirt. He put his right-rear wheel on the outside kerb braking for turn 13 and spun. Button went into the gravel on the opposite side of the circuit and retired. At the end of the lap, Barrichello entered the pit lane from the lead and was 0.6 seconds slower than Michael Schumacher. He rejoined just ahead of his teammate, as Montoya was close behind, stopping Michael Schumacher from attempting a pass.

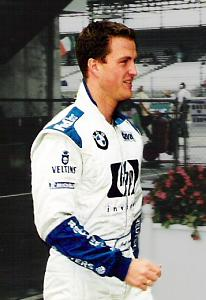
Ralf Schumacher took third place for the Williams team

Ralf Schumacher led for one lap before making his first pit stop on lap 33, returning to third. Coulthard and McLaren teammate Räikkönen made pit stops later than other drivers on laps 34 and 35, giving them an advantage. Räikkönen rejoined in sixth and Coulthard in seventh. After all drivers made their scheduled pit stops, Barrichello continued to lead from teammate Michael Schumacher. Ralf Schumacher was more than 20 seconds behind but ahead of Fisichella, Massa and Räikkönen by lap 40. Six laps later, Coulthard lost control of his McLaren's rear and ran wide off the track into the turn 11 gravel trap and grass. Despite losing some bodywork from the McLaren, he returned to the circuit still in seventh. The second round of pit stops began on lap 51. Fisichella was the first of the leaders to enter the pit lane a lap later. He had enough pace to stay ahead of Massa after the latter's second pit stop on lap 54, during which Massa had a brief issue with the refuelling rig. Meanwhile, Salo was released into De la Rosa's path in the pit lane, forcing the latter to brake sharply to avoid a collision.

On lap 55, Ralf and Michael Schumacher made their second pit stops. Both drivers remained third and second, respectively. Heidfeld baulked Michael Schumacher coming out of the pit lane between the first two turns, allowing teammate Barrichello to gain time. On lap 56, Barrichello made his second pit stop and kept the lead, just ahead of Michael Schumacher. Räikkönen and Coulthard, McLaren teammates, were able to run without traffic impeding them, resulting in faster lap times. Coulthard and Räikkönen made their pit stops between laps 59 and 61. Their long stints promoted them to fourth and fifth, respectively, dropping Fisichella to sixth and Massa to seventh. While being lapped, Davidson ran onto a dusty part of the circuit, spun rear-first off the track and into the turn nine gravel trap, retiring on lap 61. Following the second round of pit stops, Barrichello led Michael Schumacher, Ralf Schumacher, Räikkönen, Coulthard, and Fisichella. Michael Schumacher trailed Barrichello by five seconds until lap 72, when he reset the track lap record of 1:16.207, half a second quicker than Mika Häkkinen's 2001 lap.

Barrichello led for the final five laps, winning his second race of the season and third of his career. Michael Schumacher, his teammate, finished second, 0.434 seconds behind. Ferrari's one-two finish sealed the team's fourth consecutive World Constructors' Championship as Williams could not overtake their championship points total in the final four races. Ralf Schumacher finished third, 13 seconds behind. Räikkönen finished fourth, too far behind Ralf Schumacher to challenge for third. Coulthard finished fifth after seeing his car was inconsistent and nervous. Fisichella earned the final championship point in sixth, Jordan's fourth of the season. Massa finished seventh with understeer, the last driver on the lead lap. Trulli was the first lapped driver, finishing eighth after losing grip in his front-left tyre while on his third set of tyres. Heidfeld was ninth but Trulli held him off in the last laps. Sato finished tenth. Montoya finished 11th due to worsening handling. Panis finished 12th, having slowed due to an oil pressure issue. Salo was provisionally 13th, and the car's inbuilt fire extinguisher triggered and sprayed foam everywhere, ahead of De la Rosa in provisional 14th. McNish was close behind in provisional 15th after running without aerodynamic turbulence, despite gear selection issues at his pit stop. Webber was the final finisher despite his drinks bottle failing and colliding with the replacement right-front wheel and its changer Stefano Pierantoni because he entered the pit box too quickly for his first pit stop. Pierantoni's left thumb was injured. There were four retirements from the 20 qualifiers, with only two retiring from mechanical issues in the hot weather.

=== Post-race ===
The top three drivers appeared on the podium to collect their trophies and spoke to the media in the subsequent press conference. Barrichello commented on Ferrari's World Constructors' Championship win, "I think the most important thing is to have clinched the constructors' (title). I think it's, for the team, I think Michael has said many times how good they are and how good we are together so it is just a day of commemoration." Michael Schumacher stated that Ferrari were taking precautions because of the ease of making mistakes on track, "we just drove home safely, didn't force anything and that means that you can easily go two or three seconds slower and to do this time, I needed this sort of gap because otherwise I wouldn't have been able to do the time." Ralf Schumacher called his race "kind of boring" but did not expect to finish in third, "That was our target but we had such a bad weekend except for qualifying and the race today, so we are totally happy."

Ferrari sporting director Jean Todt described the outcome as the "easiest one-two" the team had ever achieved due to their faster pace from the start. Todt added Ferrari were not to blame for their dominance in Formula One and that "you have some stupid people who may find we are to blame, but that's up to them." Ross Brawn, Ferrari's technical director, stated that both drivers were driving at a controlled pace and blamed McLaren, Michelin and Williams for being off the pace throughout the race. Nevertheless, Brawn praised Ferrari's achievement as reflecting on the entire squad against them battling the manufacturers of BMW and Mercedes-Benz. Ferrari president Luca di Montezemolo praised the marque's staff and called their fourth successive Constructors' Championship victory "the greatest moment in the history of our company" and that it gave them "the greatest satisfaction and is a reward for everyone's hard work."

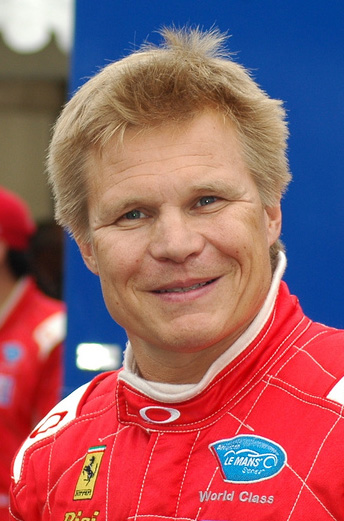
Mika Salo (pictured in 2009) received a 25-second time penalty from the stewards for an unsafe pit stop release.

Following the race, the stewards imposed a 25-second time penalty on Salo for violating FIA sporting regulations by entering De la Rosa's path in the pit lane. This dropped Salo from 13th to 15th. De la Rosa opined Salo had enough space on the right to avoid forcing him towards the pit barrier and that there was no cause to do so. Coulthard claimed Montoya was given too much publicity, and that the latter could not abide being overtaken by other drivers in battle, preferring to hit another driver or run off the circuit, "that to him seems to be okay, that's acceptable because you're not giving up your place. People say that he has big balls, but maybe it's a case of big balls and a small brain." Montoya retorted two weeks later at the Belgian Grand Prix, "I think he should try and concentrate more on doing his job and trying to beat Kimi [Raikkonen] than talking about somebody else. That's what I think."

McLaren team principal Ron Dennis stated that the team's improved performance in the race compared to qualifying was due to increased air temperatures, allowing them to extract the maximum performance from their Michelin tyres. Dennis complimented both Coulthard and Räikkönen's performances as "excellent". Fisichella described the race as "tough" because of understeer when his car was full of fuel and the fact McLaren were faster than Jordan during the race, "But sixth is great. I did my best, but that was really the maximum we could get. So I feel alright." Button admitted to making a mistake when he spun off the track. Davidson expressed satisfaction with his performance but disappointment at failing to finish, which he conceded was his fault. He stated that he would be disappointed if he caused Button's retirement and was unclear what to do in the case of being lapped, saying, "I felt as though I was driving a Fiat Panda on the motorway and being chased by a load of Ferraris."

Michael Schumacher maintained his lead in the World Drivers' Championship with 112 championship points. Barrichello's victory moved him from fourth to second with 45 championship points. The Williams duo of Ralf Schumacher and Montoya were tied on championship points with 40 each. Coulthard maintained fifth with 34 championship points. Ferrari's one-two finish clinched a fourth consecutive World Constructors' Championship with 157 championship points. Williams and McLaren remained in second and third with 80 and 54 championship points, respectively. Renault were fourth with 15 championship points, four ahead of Sauber with four rounds remaining in the season.

=== Race classification ===
Drivers who scored championship points are denoted in bold.

Pos	No	Driver	Constructor	Tyre	Laps	Time/Retired	Grid	Points
1	2	(Brazil) **Rubens Barrichello**	**Ferrari**	B	77	1:41:49.001	1	10
2	1	(Germany) **Michael Schumacher**	**Ferrari**	B	77	+ 0.434	2	6
3	5	(Germany) **Ralf Schumacher**	**Williams-BMW**	M	77	+ 13.356	3	4
4	4	(Finland) **Kimi Räikkönen**	**McLaren-Mercedes**	M	77	+ 29.479	11	3
5	3	(United Kingdom) **David Coulthard**	**McLaren-Mercedes**	M	77	+ 37.800	10	2
6	9	(Italy) **Giancarlo Fisichella**	**Jordan-Honda**	B	77	+ 1:08.804	5	1
7	8	(Brazil) Felipe Massa	Sauber-Petronas	B	77	+ 1:13.612	7	
8	14	(Italy) Jarno Trulli	Renault	M	76	+ 1 Lap	6	
9	7	(Germany) Nick Heidfeld	Sauber-Petronas	B	76	+ 1 Lap	8	
10	10	(Japan) Takuma Sato	Jordan-Honda	B	76	+ 1 Lap	14	
11	6	(Colombia) Juan Pablo Montoya	Williams-BMW	M	76	+ 1 Lap	4	
12	12	(France) Olivier Panis	BAR-Honda	B	76	+ 1 Lap	12	
13	17	(Spain) Pedro de la Rosa	Jaguar-Cosworth	M	75	+ 2 Laps	15	
14	25	(United Kingdom) Allan McNish	Toyota	M	75	+ 2 Laps	18	
15	24	(Finland) Mika Salo	Toyota	M	75	+ 2 Laps^{1}	17	
16	23	(Australia) Mark Webber	Minardi-Asiatech	M	75	+ 2 Laps	19	
Ret	22	(United Kingdom) Anthony Davidson	Minardi-Asiatech	M	58	Spun Off	20	
Ret	15	(United Kingdom) Jenson Button	Renault	M	30	Spun Off	9	
Ret	16	(United Kingdom) Eddie Irvine	Jaguar-Cosworth	M	23	Engine	16	
Ret	11	(Canada) Jacques Villeneuve	BAR-Honda	B	20	Transmission	13	

Notes

- **^1** – Mika Salo finished 13th, but received a 25-second time penalty for an unsafe release into Pedro de la Rosa's path in the pit lane.

== Championship standings after the race ==
Drivers' Championship standings

+/–	Pos	Driver	Points
	1	(Germany) Michael Schumacher*	112
2	2	(Brazil) Rubens Barrichello	45
	3	(Germany) Ralf Schumacher	40
2	4	(Colombia) Juan Pablo Montoya	40
	5	(United Kingdom) David Coulthard	34

Constructors' Championship standings

+/–	Pos	Constructor	Points
	1	(Italy) Ferrari*	157
	2	(United Kingdom) Williams-BMW	80
	3	(United Kingdom) McLaren-Mercedes	54
	4	(France) Renault	15
	5	(Switzerland) Sauber-Petronas	11
Sources:

- Note: Only the top five positions are included for both sets of standings.
- Bold text and an asterisk indicates the 2002 World Champions.

Previous race: 2002 German Grand Prix	FIA Formula One World Championship; 2002 season	Next race: 2002 Belgian Grand Prix
Previous race: 2001 Hungarian Grand Prix	Hungarian Grand Prix	Next race: 2003 Hungarian Grand Prix
Awards
Preceded by 2001 Canadian Grand Prix	Formula One Promotional Trophy for Race Promoter; 2002	Succeeded by 2003 Spanish Grand Prix
