= 2002 German Grand Prix =

12th round of the 2002 Formula One season

Race 12 of 17 in the 2002 Formula One World Championship
← Previous race	Next race →

Race details
- Date: 28 July 2002
- Official name: Grosser Mobil 1 Preis von Deutschland 2002
- Location: Hockenheimring, Hockenheim, Baden-Württemberg, Germany
- Course: Permanent racing facility
- Course length: 4.574 km (2.842 miles)
- Distance: 67 laps, 306.458 km (190.424 miles)
- Weather: Fine, Air Temp: 28°C

Pole position
Driver	(Germany) Michael Schumacher	Ferrari
- Time: 1:14.389

Fastest lap
Driver	(Germany) Michael Schumacher	Ferrari
- Time: 1:16.462 on lap 44

Podium
First	(Germany) Michael Schumacher	Ferrari
Second	(Colombia) Juan Pablo Montoya	Williams-BMW
Third	(Germany) Ralf Schumacher	Williams-BMW

The 2002 German Grand Prix (formally the Grosser Mobil 1 Preis von Deutschland 2002) was a Formula One motor race held at the Hockenheimring, Hockenheim, Baden-Württemberg, Germany on 28 July 2002. It was the 12th of 17 rounds in the 2002 Formula One World Championship and the second Grand Prix to be held in Germany that year. Ferrari driver Michael Schumacher won the 67-lap race from pole position. The Williams duo of Juan Pablo Montoya and Ralf Schumacher finished second and third, respectively.

This was the first race to be held on the reconfigured Hockenheimring circuit, which was decreased in length for safety and better spectator viewing. Michael Schumacher, the World Drivers' Champion, qualified on pole position after setting the fastest lap time in the one-hour qualifying session. Schumacher led for most of the race, except for two rounds of pit stops, and achieved his ninth victory of the season and 62nd of his career. Montoya finished second, 10.5 seconds behind, when his teammate Ralf Schumacher made an unscheduled pit stop late in the race to repressurise the car's pneumatic valve-gear reservoir when the air pressure in the engine's pneumatic valve system dropped.

The race result maintained Michael Schumacher's unassailable lead in the World Drivers' Championship with 106 championship points. Montoya remained in second while his teammate Ralf Schumacher overtook Ferrari's Rubens Barrichello for third. Ferrari extended their World Constructors' Championship advantage over Williams to 56 championship points with five races remaining in the season.

== Background ==
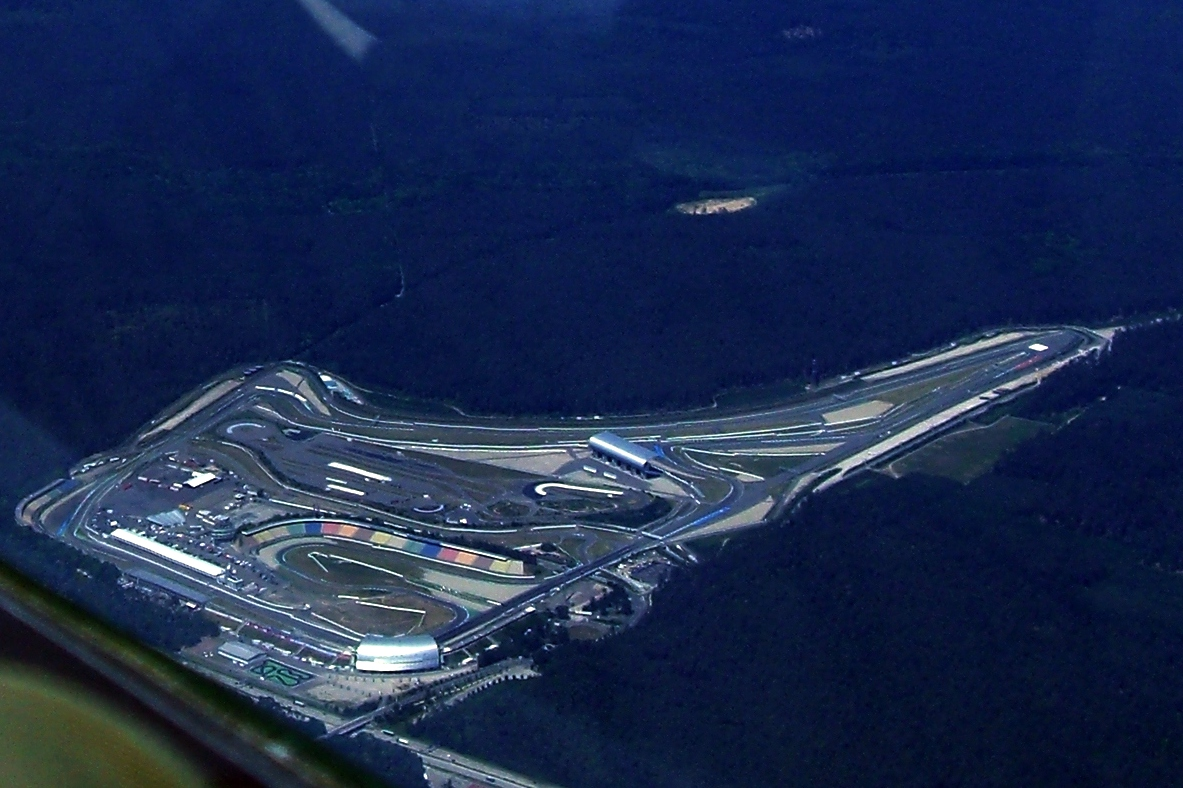
The Hockenheimring (pictured in 2009), where the German Grand Prix took place.

The 2002 German Grand Prix was the 12th of 17 rounds in the 2002 Formula One World Championship, contested on 28 July 2002 at the 4.574 km (2.842 mi) clockwise Hockenheimring in Hockenheim, Baden-Württemberg, South West Germany. It was one of two Grands Prix to be held in Germany after the European Grand Prix the month before.

Heading into the Grand Prix, Ferrari driver Michael Schumacher had already won the season's World Drivers' Championship, having clinched the title at the previous race, the French Grand Prix. Michael Schumacher led the championship with 96 championship points, ahead of Williams driver Juan Pablo Montoya with 34 championship points. Although the World Drivers' Championship was decided, the World Constructors' Championship was not. Ferrari were leading with 128 championship points while Williams were second with 66 championship points and McLaren were third on 47 championship points.

With Michael Schumacher world champion, Ferrari technical director Ross Brawn stated that the team would focus on helping his teammate Rubens Barrichello win races and become runner-up he contended for with Montoya, Ralf Schumacher and McLaren's David Coulthard. Michael Schumacher won the German Grand Prix at the Hockenheimring in 1995 and he wanted to win for the second time. He admitted that winning in Germany would be a satisfying way to celebrate his record-tying fifth world championship. Montoya said his team was travelling to the track hoping to demonstrate a better performing package than in France.

To increase safety and spectator watching, the Hockenheimring's layout was reduced from 6.8 km (4.2 mi) to 4.5 km (2.8 mi). However, the race distance was raised from 45 to 67 laps to appeal to advertisers and television. Bernie Ecclestone, the owner of Formula One's commercial rights, sought the alterations, which were carried out by Tilke GmbH director Hermann Tilke. A long, curved straight called the Parabolika led into the new Spitzkehre hairpin before the demolished Senna chicane, which began with a new right-hand turn that bypassed the former Clark and Ost chicanes. Following the hairpin, there was an extra set of turns that included a quick right-hander, a tight left and a medium right before returning to the former stadium complex via a straight.

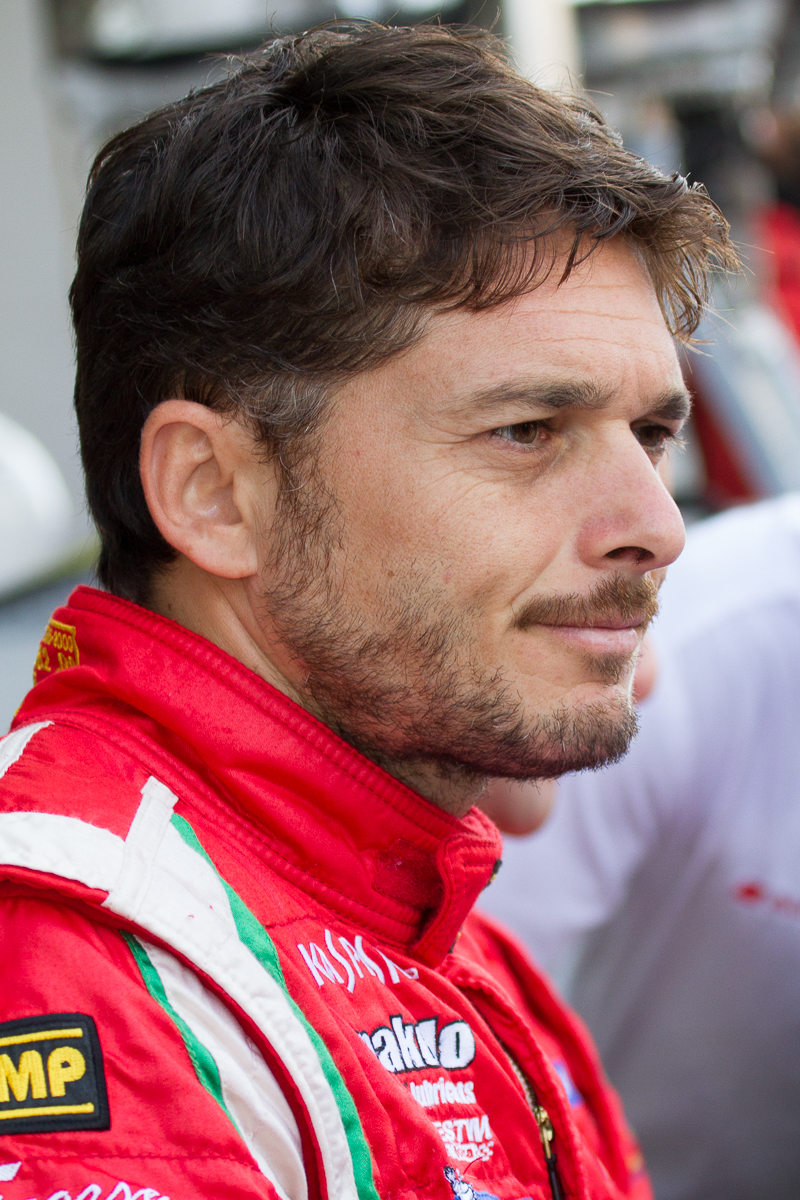
Giancarlo Fisichella (pictured in 2012) was passed fit to compete in Germany after a major accident in the preceding French Grand Prix.

The changes to the track received a mixed response. Michael Schumacher stated the revised layout "flows nicely and there are some overtaking opportunities. It is quite demanding." His brother Ralf Schumacher said it was "one of the best" he had driven on, while Norbert Haug, Mercedes-Benz motorsport head, believed the layout would improve the racing facility. Former driver Jacques Laffite believed trackside spectators and television viewers would benefit watching the action. British American Racing's (BAR) Jacques Villeneuve called it "a typical modern circuit and not as interesting to drive." Jaguar's Pedro de la Rosa described the track as quite slippery and that its character had been removed to such an extent "you could be racing anywhere. The individualism has been compromised too much." McLaren CEO Ron Dennis said the circuit alterations had "cut the heart out of something which was very special, very emotional, something which had his own special." Sauber's Nick Heidfeld stated his preference for the former layout.

A total of eleven teams (each representing a different constructor) with two drivers each entered the event, with no changes from the season entry list. Arrows entered the race despite financial difficulties, after failing to qualify for the preceding French Grand Prix due to a violation of the 107% rule. Their actions in Germany would reportedly be closely scrutinised as team owner Tom Walkinshaw was warned that race director Charlie Whiting could have reported them to the race stewards if they violated the International Sporting Code's article on "actions prejudicial to the spirit of competition" by failing to adequately attempt to qualify for the race. Jordan driver Giancarlo Fisichella was passed fit to enter the event. At the previous race in France, he had a major accident during the final free practice session and was judged unfit by Fédération Internationale de l'Automobile (FIA) medical delegate Sid Watkins due to the high deceleration Fisichella experienced in the crash. Watkins examined Fisichella medically at Hockenheim and cleared him to compete.

The one-week gap between the French and German Grands Prix meant there was no in-season testing between the two races. It also curtailed the number of technical innovations introduced to the circuit, as did the new circuit design, which no longer required the very low aerodynamic load setups employed until the 2001 season. Mercedes and Honda both brought more powerful engines to the track, while Williams, which opened up vents in the sides to improve heat dissipation in France, added extra openings to the bodywork's rear section.

== Practice ==
Preceding the race were two one-hour practice sessions on Friday and two 45-minute sessions on Saturday. Rain fell overnight making the circuit damp and the new track surface had a relatively low level of grip. During the first practice session, in cool, humid and overcast weather on Friday morning, Barrichello lapped fastest at 1:16.248 on his final lap of the session. Michael Schumacher, BAR's Olivier Panis, McLaren's Kimi Räikkönen, Heidfeld, Montoya, Sauber's Felipe Massa, the Jordan pair of Takuma Sato and Fisichella and Arrows's Heinz-Harald Frentzen completed the top ten. Some drivers went off the track. Fisichella removed a bargeboard from his car after colliding with a gravel trap at Agip corner in the stadium area, but he returned to the pit lane. His car's floor was subsequently replaced. After completing nine laps with around 20 minutes left, De la Rosa's car billowed smoke from the rear due to an engine failure leaving the hairpin. Coulthard managed six laps due to a split boot on a constant-velocity joint.

It was slightly warmer for the second practice session later on Friday afternoon. Michael Schumacher set the day's fastest lap time of 1:16.086 with five minutes remaining, 0.182 seconds ahead of his teammate Barrichello. The McLaren duo of Räikkönen and Coulthard as well as Ralf Schumacher, Jaguar's Eddie Irvine, Montoya, Massa, Toyota's Allan McNish and Frentzen followed in the top ten. More drivers spun off the circuit. Alex Yoong spun his Minardi car at turn two and beached upon a kerb with the rear off the tarmac surface, ending his session early. With three minutes remaining, Fisichella's engine failed at the Nordkurve corner. Oil and moisture was laid at turn one's braking zone, catching out Massa whose front wing's right-hand side was removed upon the kerbing. Renault's Jarno Trulli spun backwards braking for the Sachs turn, becoming stuck in the gravel trap. Panis's stopped on track with a suspected clutch failure and lost 40 minutes of running.

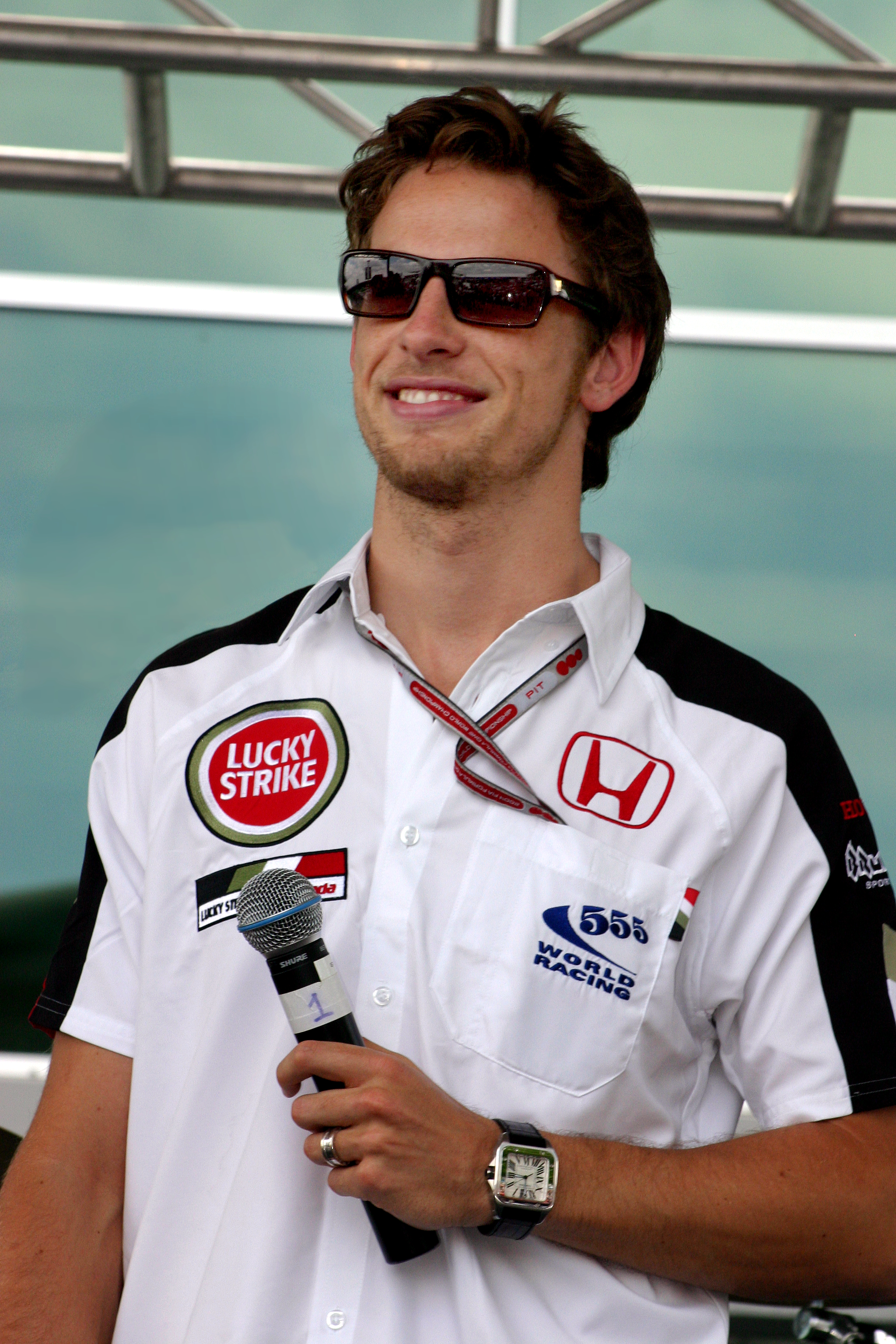
Jenson Button (pictured in 2004) crashed during the third practice session

The third practice session on Saturday morning was held in overcast but warm weather. Michael Schumacher was fastest with a 1:15.337 lap, 0.122 seconds faster than teammate Barrichello. Williams teammates Montoya and Ralf Schumacher, Coulthard, Massa, Fisichella, Panis. Heidfeld and Sato were in positions third through tenth. Some drivers again spun during the session. Renault's Jenson Button suffered a gearbox selection issue, leaving him in neutral when he mistakenly hit the neutral button midway through the first corner, He nudged the tyre wall rear-first before stopping in the opposite direction. At the final turn, Barrichello spun rear-first across the gravel trap and touched the wall.

Cloudy conditions were observed in the final practice session on Saturday morning. Michael Schumacher lapped faster by almost a second and was the only driver in the 1:14-bracket with a time of 1:14.487. Ralf Schumacher was 0.667 seconds behind in second. Barrichello, Montoya, Heidfeld, Massa, Fisichella, Toyota's Mika Salo, Coulthard and McNish occupied third through tenth. Fewer spins happened during the session as drivers were more aware of the track limits and more rubber was on the circuit. Sato sat out the session due to an exhaust-related issue that arose early on.

== Qualifying ==
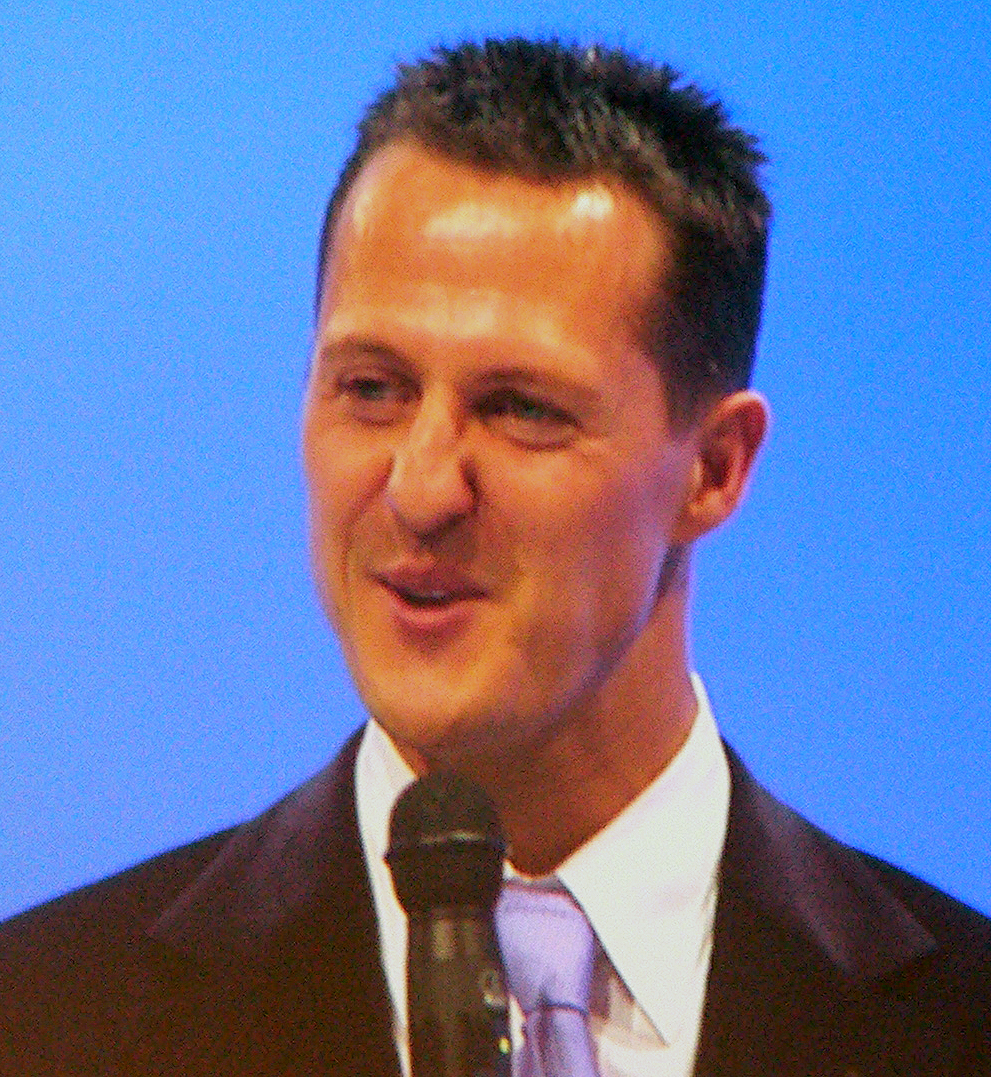
Michael Schumacher (pictured in 2007) qualified on pole position and went on to win the race the next day.

Each driver was allowed twelve laps during Saturday's one-hour qualifying session, with starting positions determined by the drivers' quickest laps. During this session, the 107% rule was in effect, requiring each driver to remain within 107% of the quickest lap time in order to qualify for the race. Qualifying took place in cloudy, dry and warm conditions, and it was marked by a battle between the Schumacher brothers. Michael Schumacher secured his fourth pole position of the season, his first since the Spanish Grand Prix three months earlier and 47th of his career with a 1:14.389 lap, set in the last seconds of qualifying, ending Montoya's five-race pole streak. His second run saw him mount too much kerb at turn one, lose control of his Ferrari, and drive onto the run-off area, aborting the run. Ralf Schumacher qualified second, 0.181 seconds slower, and took pole position with nine minutes left until Michael Schumacher's best lap. Barrichello led midway through qualifying, made small racing setup changes to his Ferrari for his third and fourth runs, resulting in a minor time loss since he mounted a kerb on his third lap and ran wide on the next, leaving him third. Montoya, fourth, had understeer, going through Agip turn's gravel trap into the stadium section on his first run. He locked the front tyres at the hairpin on his final run. Räikkönen led early on, and set times that may have contested for pole position in the first two sectors, but ended up fifth. Fisichella matched his and Jordan's season's best qualifying result in sixth; he was happy with how the car felt. Panis qualified seventh, his best start of the season, despite aborting his first run after going wide twice; his team had to fine-tune his car's driveability. Trulli's mechanics altered the chassis setup between runs to accommodate the ever-changing circuit conditions, securing eighth on his final quick lap. Coulthard qualified ninth, four places behind his teammate, oversteering wide on his third run. Heidfeld took tenth on his last run in the spare Sauber car setup for him.

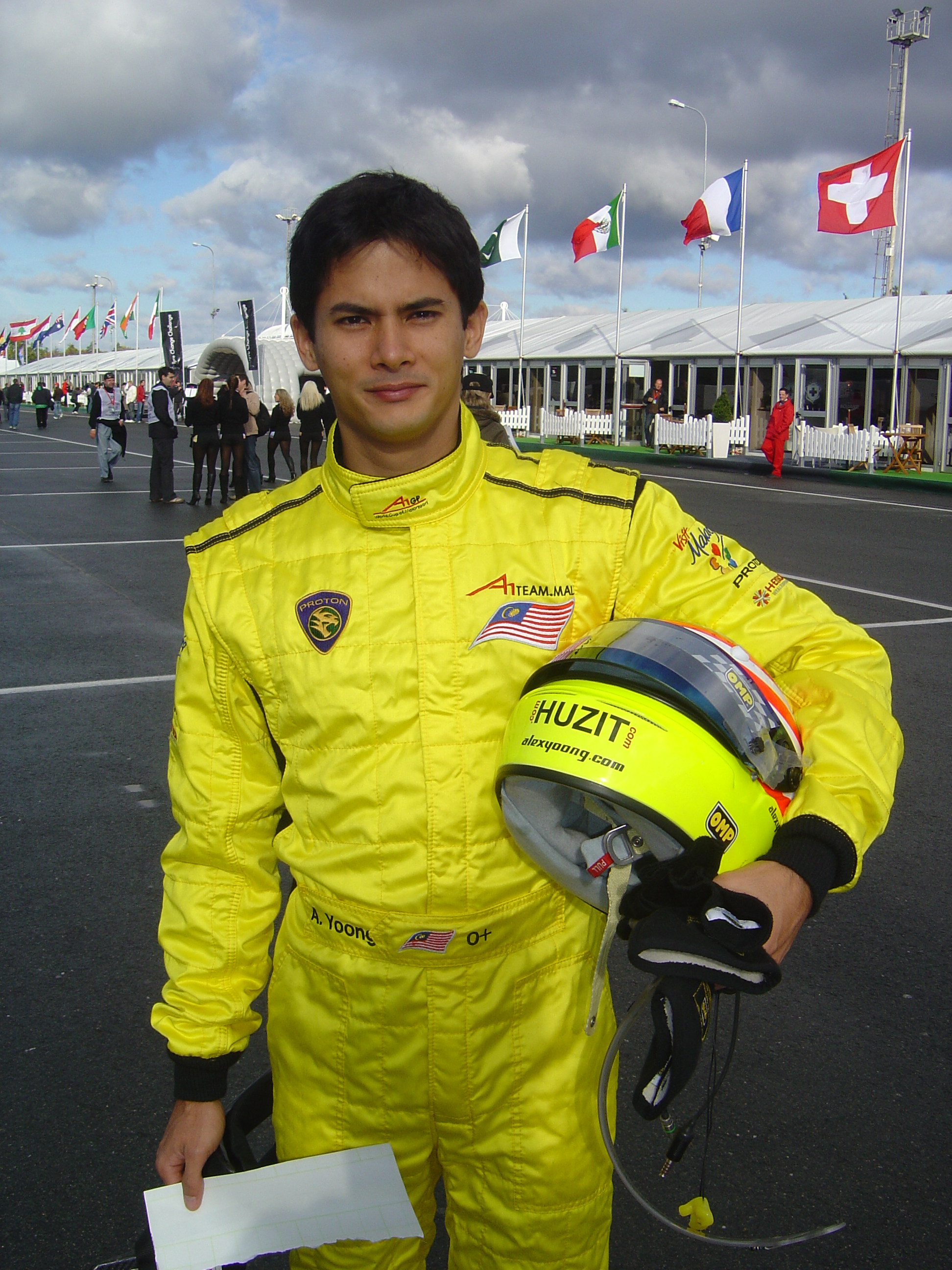
Alex Yoong (pictured in 2006) failed to qualify for a Grand Prix for the third time in the season by transgressing the 107% rule.

Villeneuve qualified 11th and was lapping faster on his final run before encountering Coulthard in the final two corners, forcing him to lose front aerodynamics, run wide, and spin in avoidance. Sato spent some of qualifying modifying the setup that dialled out the oversteer he had when the session began, finishing 12th. After an engine issue, Button was unable to use a qualifying engine and was forced to revert to an earlier specification. Minor errors on his last run left him 13th. Massa, 14th, experienced grip issues, understeer when accelerating out of slow corners, nervousness in high-speed turns, and a deterioration in handling balance as track temperatures rose. Frentzen in 15th complained his vehicle was not as quick as it should have been. Irvine experienced mid-corner understeer but improved with each run for 16th. McNish, 17th, qualified ahead of teammate Salo for the first time in the season. Toyota modified his car slightly after the morning free practice sessions, gaining time in the first two sectors but losing time in the final sector. Enrique Bernoldi, Frentzen's teammate, was pleased with his car's improved balance and took 18th. Salo (19th) lost car balance and understeered as the track conditions changed during the interval. De la Rosa chose a different tyre compound than teammate Irvine, understeered, and ran wide twice in the stadium section, taking 20th. Minardi's Mark Webber was the final qualifier in 21st after traffic prevented him from lapping faster. Despite a major improvement in lap time on his last run, Webber's teammate Yoong did not lap within 107% of Michael Schumacher's pole time, failing to qualify for the third time in the season. A request by Minardi owner Paul Stoddart to allow Yoong into the race was rejected by the race stewards, citing "no exceptional circumstances". This meant 21 drivers started the race.

=== Qualifying classification ===
Pos	No	Driver	Constructor	Lap	Gap	Grid
1	1	(Germany) Michael Schumacher	Ferrari	1:14.389	—	1
2	5	(Germany) Ralf Schumacher	Williams-BMW	1:14.570	+0.181	2
3	2	(Brazil) Rubens Barrichello	Ferrari	1:14.693	+0.304	3
4	6	(Colombia) Juan Pablo Montoya	Williams-BMW	1:15.108	+0.719	4
5	4	(Finland) Kimi Räikkönen	McLaren-Mercedes	1:15.639	+1.250	5
6	9	(Italy) Giancarlo Fisichella	Jordan-Honda	1:15.690	+1.301	6
7	12	(France) Olivier Panis	BAR-Honda	1:15.851	+1.462	7
8	14	(Italy) Jarno Trulli	Renault	1:15.885	+1.496	8
9	3	(United Kingdom) David Coulthard	McLaren-Mercedes	1:15.909	+1.520	9
10	7	(Germany) Nick Heidfeld	Sauber-Petronas	1:15.990	+1.601	10
11	11	(Canada) Jacques Villeneuve	BAR-Honda	1:16.070	+1.681	11
12	10	(Japan) Takuma Sato	Jordan-Honda	1:16.072	+1.683	12
13	15	(United Kingdom) Jenson Button	Renault	1:16.278	+1.889	13
14	8	(Brazil) Felipe Massa	Sauber-Petronas	1:16.351	+1.962	14
15	20	(Germany) Heinz-Harald Frentzen	Arrows-Cosworth	1:16.505	+2.116	15
16	16	(United Kingdom) Eddie Irvine	Jaguar-Cosworth	1:16.533	+2.144	16
17	25	(United Kingdom) Allan McNish	Toyota	1:16.594	+2.205	17
18	21	(Brazil) Enrique Bernoldi	Arrows-Cosworth	1:16.645	+2.256	18
19	24	(Finland) Mika Salo	Toyota	1:16.685	+2.296	19
20	17	(Spain) Pedro de la Rosa	Jaguar-Cosworth	1:17.077	+2.688	20
21	23	(Australia) Mark Webber	Minardi-Asiatech	1:17.996	+3.607	21
107% time: 1:19.596
DNQ	22	(Malaysia) Alex Yoong	Minardi-Asiatech	1:19.775	+5.386	—

== Warm-up ==
On race morning, a half-hour warm-up session was held for teams to shake down their race and spare cars in hot, humid and sunny weather. Michael Schumacher was the only driver to lap in the 1:16 range, clocking a 1:16.726 at the end of warm-up. Positions two to ten were occupied by Barrichello, Fisichella, Panis, Sato, Heidfeld, Coulthard, Ralf Schumacher, Räikkönen and Montoya. There were few spinners and the track surface appeared to provide more grip. Driving the spare Arrows car, Frentzen spun into the turn two gravel trap midway through the session, but was brought back onto the circuit and returned to pit lane.

== Race ==
The race began at 14:00 local time. Between 117,000 to 120,000 spectators attended the event. (Note: Sources vary on the attendance, with 117,000 and 120,000.) Conditions at the start were hot and sunny, with the air temperature between 28 and 34 °C (82 and 93 °F) and the track temperature ranged from 38 and 47 °C (100 and 117 °F). During the reconnaissance laps to line up on the grid, Barrichello found a malfunction in his race car's gearbox upshift mechanism. Barrichello's race car was moved off the track by his mechanics, and he was sent to the Ferrari garage to drive the spare Ferrari setup for him. He exited the pit lane 15 seconds before the red lights lighted at the pit lane exit, allowing him start from third. According to Alan Henry of The Guardian, the hot track temperatures threatened to make tyre wear a major worry for teams during the race.

When the red lights went out to begin the race, Michael Schumacher made a clean start to keep his lead, followed by Ralf Schumacher in second and Barrichello in third. Barrichello impeded Montoya's pass for third, forcing him to brake early, and Räikkönen on the outside chose to pass Montoya for fourth into the hairpin. Frentzen was stranded on the grid after stalling his car and Arrows mechanics moved him into the pit lane. His engine was eventually restarted, rejoining the race two laps down. Webber got stuck on the grid due to a launch control system fault but was able to restart the car and drive. De la Rosa drove to the side of the track as he lost drive selecting seventh gear on the back straight, becoming the race's first retirement. Button and Massa had the best starts, gaining three spots from their starting positions, while Villeneuve fell from 11th to 15th. At the conclusion of the first lap, Michael Schumacher led Ralf Schumacher by 1.6 seconds. They were followed by Barrichello, Räikkönen, Montoya and Trulli.

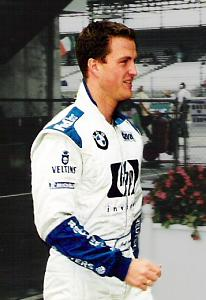
Ralf Schumacher finished in third position

Barrichello began to challenge Ralf Schumacher for second before Ralf Schumacher pulled away slightly; Michael Schumacher, Barrichello's teammate, also began to draw away from the field. On lap two, Sato ran wide in the stadium section, allowing Villeneuve to pass him. Two laps later, Webber overtook Salo for 18th, while Massa forced Button wide at the hairpin for tenth. McNish fell from 15th to 17th after Irvine and Bernoldi passed him. Irvine spun at the hairpin on lap six but recovered, dropping from 15th to 19th. Button lost engine power and differential troubles on that lap, as Villenueve and Sato passed him at the hairpin. Montoya was notified over the radio that he was losing time to Räikkönen and needed to pass him. On lap 11, Montoya was given extra power by BMW because a pit crew member opted to lift the restrictor on the engine's rev limiter once the oil and water temperatures were safe enough to enable such a scenario as he duelled Räikkönen. He attempted to pass Räikkönen on the outside at the hairpin, but braked too late and ran wide, allowing Räikkönen to maintain fourth. Montoya battled Räikkönen into the stadium section, drawing alongside the McLaren. He drove on the inside, squeezing Räikkönen onto the grass at the Agip turn exit, to take fourth.

On lap 12, Coulthard passed Trulli for sixth at the hairpin because Trulli's rear tyres were graining faster than any other driver's. Fisichella ran wide at Agip corner due to a driver error, allowing Massa to pass him for eighth on the following lap. Panis overtook Trulli for seventh on the same lap. On lap 15, Massa took eighth by braking later than Trulli on the inside at the hairpin. Two laps later, Trulli made the race's first pit stop to replace his grained tyres. Trulli baulked Ralf Schumacher on lap 21, allowing Barrichello to get in and challenge for third. On lap 23, Frentzen retired in the garage with an hydraulic leak. Webber entered the pit lane to retire with an leaking hydraulic seal two laps later. McNish's Toyota had a hydraulic failure and began leaking shortly after his first pit stop, resulting in a rear-end fire. He retired at the hairpin's side, with smoke billowing from the car's back. On lap 26, Button retired to the side of the track after his engine cut out due to a traction control system issue.

On lap 26, Barrichello became the first of the leaders to make a pit stop, falling to fourth behind Montoya. On the following lap, Räikkönen made his first pit stop, dropping from fifth to seventh in 9.2 seconds and no tyres were changed during the stop. Michael Schumacher had been nursing rear blistered tyres since lap 15, slowing him slightly and allowing Ralf Schumacher to close up. On lap 27, he made his first pit stop from the lead and Ralf Schumacher took the lead after his 8.4-second stop. Ralf Schumacher set the race's fastest lap on lap 28 trying to catch Michael Schumacher. On lap 29, he enter the pit lane, only to be blocked by the slow Villeneuve because Villeneuve's gearbox had failed until he moved out of Ralf Schumacher's path, losing him around two to three seconds. He fell to third, behind Michael Schumacher and Montoya but just ahead of Barrichello. Montoya led for one lap before his first pit stop on lap 30, falling to fourth, behind Barrichello.

Massa was instructed to allow Heidfeld pass into eighth, which he did at the hairpin on lap 34. On the same lap, the FIA stewards imposed a drive-through penalty on Trulli for disobeying the blue flags to let faster cars past after baulking Ralf Schumacher. He served the penalty on lap 35. Three laps later, Räikkönen's left-rear tyre suffered a puncture possibly caused by wreckage leaving the hairpin. He drove carefully to the pit lane despite the disintegrating tyre flailing rubber from the wheel and damaging the rear bodywork, and went through a gravel trap. Räikkönen went from fifth to outside the points-paying places at the back of the field, 14th, suffering damage to the rear brake duct from the flailing tyre. His teammate Coulthard moved to fifth and Panis to sixth. Trulli attempted to pass Sato on the following lap, but he went across the gravel trap after locking his brakes, colliding with the tyre barrier at the Sachskurve turn. Panis in sixth spun at the entry to turn two when his engine seized on lap 41, causing his retirement.

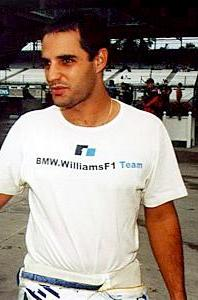
Juan Pablo Montoya finished in second place

The second round of pit stops began on lap 44 as Massa entered the pit lane. Heidfeld made a pit stop from sixth two laps later, dropping to seventh. Barrichello's second pit stop on lap 46 was problematic. His Ferrari's fuel flap failed to open when the team wanted to insert the refuelling rig into his car, losing him ten seconds as the issue was cured. The stop lasted 21.2 seconds and dropped him to fourth, ending his chance of a podium result. Michael Schumacher made his second pit stop from the lead on the following lap. His 8.5-second pit stop dropped him to second behind Ralf Schumacher, who led for one lap before making his second stop for fuel on lap 48. Ralf Schumacher almost ran over the lollipop holder, who appeared to be distracted since Williams had not replaced the car's tyres. His teammate Montoya took the lead until his second pit stop on the next lap, when he re-emerged ahead of Barrichello. On lap 51, Bernoldi left the track at turn two, smoke rising from his car's back, due to an engine failure. Bernoldi's engine failure laid oil on the circuit.

On lap 59, Irvine was driving slowly on the circuit because a brake caliper spilt fluids following two previous spins caused by traction control issues, forcing him to turn the system off to keep the engine running. Irvine retired in the pit lane. Fisichella went off the track at turn two, smoke billowing from his car's rear, due to an engine failure on lap 61. That lap saw the final retirement. Räikkönen's brakes failed due to the earlier tyre delamination. He spun backwards into the tyre barrier at the Sudkurve turn and retired. On lap 64, Ralf Schumacher took a third (and final) unplanned pit stop to allow the Williams team to repressurise the car's pneumatic valve-gear reservoir when the air pressure in the engine's pneumatic valve system dropped. His 7.2-second pit stop dropped him to third, behind teammate Montoya.

Michael Schumacher did not experience graining on his second and third sets of tyres, slowing in the final laps to secure his ninth victory in the season's 12 races and 62nd of his career. He equalled his own record of the most wins in a single season in 1995, 2000 and 2001 and Nigel Mansell in 1992. Montoya was off the pace but ran cleanly to finish second, 10.5 seconds behind, while Ralf Schumacher completed the podium in third. Barrichello was slower than his teammate in the last laps, finishing fourth. Coulthard finished fifth, having started ninth. Heidfeld went across the grass during the race, but due to attrition, took sixth and earned the final championship point. His teammate Massa was seventh. Sato took eighth, his highest result of the time, despite the car's handling degrading in the latter part of the race. Salo was the final classified finisher in ninth, having made front wing tweaks during his first pit stop to improve the Toyota's performance after discovering it was oversteering on his first set of tyres. The hot weather conditions led to a high rate of attrition, with nine of the 21 starters finishing the Grand Prix.

=== Post-race ===
The top three drivers appeared on the podium to collect their trophies and spoke to the media in the subsequent press conference. Michael Schumacher commented on his victory, "It's without words honestly, because we have achieved so much in this year that it's amazing. I only thank God that he was giving me this opportunity. The team, again, did a fantastic job. It was a very tight battle today between Ralf and myself but I think the German fans really loved that." Montoya said on finishing second, "I've been on pole for the last five races and out of the last six races, this is my best result - and I wasn't on pole." Ralf Schumacher called it "a disappointing day" for the Williams team, "The team, myself, everything went wrong which could have done. I was held up by some guys, I couldn't do my pit stop because someone in front of me was so slow and then, at the end, we had to come in. It was just a safety stop because we were having a problem with the engine."

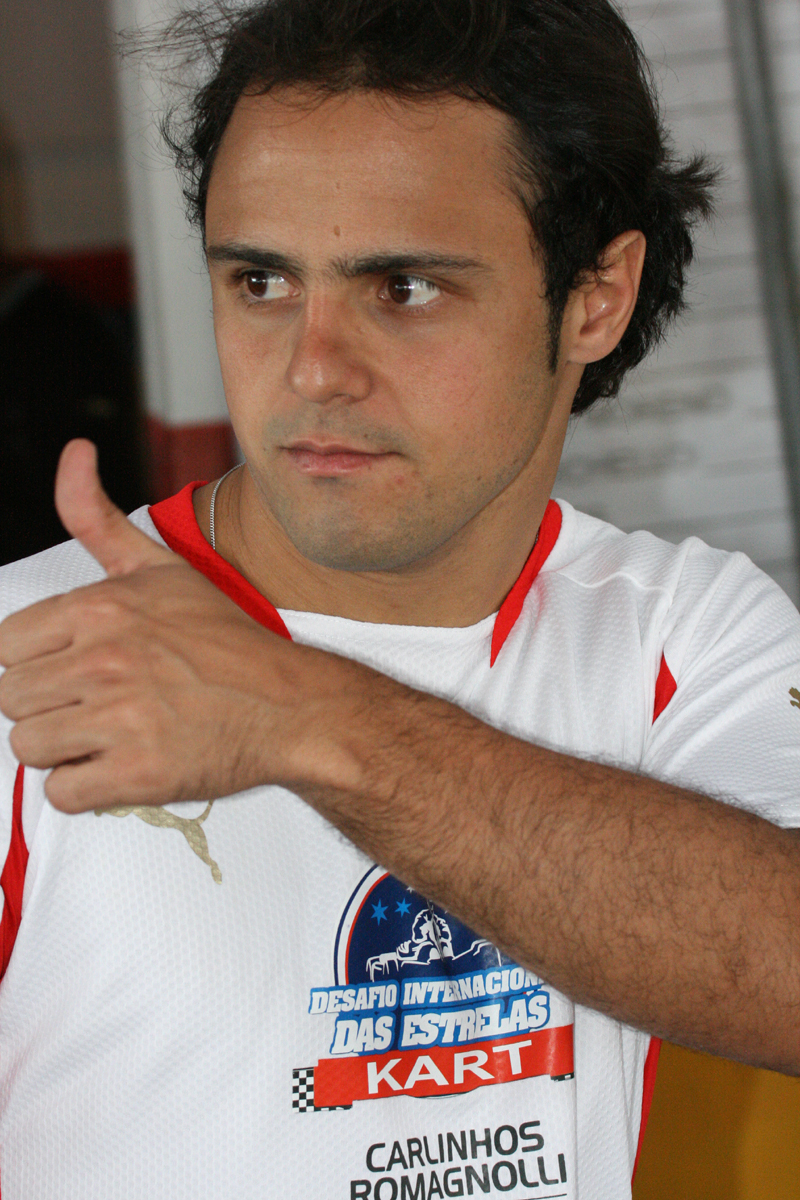
Felipe Massa (pictured in 2007) was ordered to let his Sauber teammate Nick Heidfeld past during the race.

Williams chief operations engineer Sam Michael said the outcome of the race proved the difference of starting from pole position because if Williams had been on pole, they would have been ahead of Michael Schumacher during the opening laps and got stronger over the stint, adding, "We got held up at that first pit stop and without it I think we could have got ahead." Massa stated that while he understood Sauber's decision to ask him to allow Heidfeld through, he did not know why his teammate did not cede the position to him later in the race, "That would have been fair because this point belonged to me." His race engineer, Jacky Eeckelaert, said that the result upset Massa while team principal Peter Sauber stated that his decision to allow Heidfeld past was justified because Heidfeld was lapping faster.

Willi Weber, the Schumacher brothers' manager, stated he was disappointed that the siblings did not finish first and second, "It could have gone a little better I think because it is a pity Ralf lost his second place because that was what I wanted to see Michael first and Ralf second or Ralf first and Michael second." BMW Motorsport director Gerhard Berger was delighted that the Williams team was closer to race winner Michael Schumacher on this occasion, after leading in qualifying but losing ground throughout the race. Barrichello stated that he would have been unlucky not to be able to drive the spare Ferrari, which allowed him to make a standard start. He added that he lost three championship points but gained three more, "so on balance it's not too bad." Räikkönen stated the left-rear tyre delamination did not surprise him, but he would have finished fifth without it.

Michael Schumacher maintained his lead in the World Drivers' Championship with 106 championship points. Montoya retained second with 40 championship points while Ralf Schumacher's third-place finish elevated him from fourth to third. Barrichello fell from third to fourth while Coulthard remained fifth. Ferrari maintained its World Constructors' Championship lead, with 141 championship points, extending their advantage over the second-placed Williams to 65 championship points. With five races left in the season, McLaren retained third while Renault and Sauber remained fourth and fifth.

=== Race classification ===
Drivers who scored championship points are denoted in bold.

Pos	No	Driver	Constructor	Tyre	Laps	Time/Retired	Grid	Points
1	1	(Germany) **Michael Schumacher**	**Ferrari**	B	67	1:27:52.078	1	10
2	6	(Colombia) **Juan Pablo Montoya**	**Williams-BMW**	M	67	+10.503	4	6
3	5	(Germany) **Ralf Schumacher**	**Williams-BMW**	M	67	+14.466	2	4
4	2	(Brazil) **Rubens Barrichello**	**Ferrari**	B	67	+23.195	3	3
5	3	(United Kingdom) **David Coulthard**	**McLaren-Mercedes**	M	66	+1 Lap	9	2
6	7	(Germany) **Nick Heidfeld**	**Sauber-Petronas**	B	66	+1 Lap	10	1
7	8	(Brazil) Felipe Massa	Sauber-Petronas	B	66	+1 Lap	14	
8	10	(Japan) Takuma Sato	Jordan-Honda	B	66	+1 Lap	12	
9	24	(Finland) Mika Salo	Toyota	M	66	+1 Lap	19	
Ret	9	(Italy) Giancarlo Fisichella	Jordan-Honda	B	59	Engine	6	
Ret	4	(Finland) Kimi Räikkönen	McLaren-Mercedes	M	59	Spun off	5	
Ret	16	(United Kingdom) Eddie Irvine	Jaguar-Cosworth	M	57	Brakes	16	
Ret	21	(Brazil) Enrique Bernoldi	Arrows-Cosworth	B	48	Engine	18	
Ret	12	(France) Olivier Panis	BAR-Honda	B	39	Engine	7	
Ret	14	(Italy) Jarno Trulli	Renault	M	36	Spun off	8	
Ret	11	(Canada) Jacques Villeneuve	BAR-Honda	B	27	Gearbox	11	
Ret	15	(United Kingdom) Jenson Button	Renault	M	24	Engine	13	
Ret	25	(United Kingdom) Allan McNish	Toyota	M	23	Engine	17	
Ret	23	(Australia) Mark Webber	Minardi-Asiatech	M	23	Hydraulics	21	
Ret	20	(Germany) Heinz-Harald Frentzen	Arrows-Cosworth	B	18	Hydraulics	15	
Ret	17	(Spain) Pedro de la Rosa	Jaguar-Cosworth	M	0	Transmission	20	
DNQ	22	(Malaysia) Alex Yoong	Minardi-Asiatech	M	—	107% Rule	—	

== Championship standings after the race ==
Drivers' Championship standings

+/–	Pos	Driver	Points
	1	(Germany) Michael Schumacher*	106
	2	(Colombia) Juan Pablo Montoya	40
1	3	(Germany) Ralf Schumacher	36
1	4	(Brazil) Rubens Barrichello	35
	5	(United Kingdom) David Coulthard	32

Constructors' Championship standings

+/–	Pos	Constructor	Points
	1	(Italy) Ferrari*	141
	2	(United Kingdom) Williams-BMW*	76
	3	(United Kingdom) McLaren-Mercedes	49
	4	(France) Renault	15
	5	(Switzerland) Sauber-Petronas	11
Sources:

- Note: Only the top five positions are included for both sets of standings.
- Bold text and an asterisk indicates competitors who still had a theoretical chance of becoming World Champion.

== Notes ==
Previous race: 2002 French Grand Prix	FIA Formula One World Championship; 2002 season	Next race: 2002 Hungarian Grand Prix
Previous race: 2001 German Grand Prix	German Grand Prix	Next race: 2003 German Grand Prix
