= 2002 French Grand Prix =

Race 11 of 17 in the 2002 Formula One World Championship
| ← Previous race | Next race → |

Race details
- Date: 21 July 2002
- Official name: Mobil 1 Grand Prix de France 2002
- Location: Circuit de Nevers Magny-Cours, Magny-Cours, Burgundy, France
- Course: Permanent racing facility
- Course length: 4.251 km (2.641 miles)
- Distance: 72 laps, 305.886 km (190.069 miles)
- Weather: Warm and sunny, Air Temp: 25°C

Pole position
| Driver | (Colombia) Juan Pablo Montoya | Williams-BMW |
- Time: 1:11.985

Fastest lap
| Driver | (United Kingdom) David Coulthard | McLaren-Mercedes |
- Time: 1:15.045 on lap 62

Podium
| First | (Germany) Michael Schumacher | Ferrari |
| Second | (Finland) Kimi Räikkönen | McLaren-Mercedes |
| Third | (United Kingdom) David Coulthard | McLaren-Mercedes |

The 2002 French Grand Prix (formally the Mobil 1 Grand Prix de France 2002) was a Formula One motor race held before 106,000 spectators at the Circuit de Nevers Magny-Cours in Magny-Cours, Burgundy, France on 21 July 2002. It was the 11th of 17 rounds of the 2002 Formula One World Championship as well as the 11th anniversary of Magny-Cours' debut Formula One event. Ferrari driver Michael Schumacher won the 72-lap race after starting in second. McLaren teammates Kimi Räikkönen and David Coulthard finished second and third, respectively. Schumacher's victory confirmed him as the 2002 World Drivers' Champion, as no other driver could overtake Schumacher's championship points total with a record six races remaining in the season.

Only Michael Schumacher, his teammate Rubens Barrichello and Williams's Juan Pablo Montoya were in contention for the World Drivers' Championship entering the race, with Schumacher leading by 54 championship points. Ferrari led Williams in the World Constructors Championship by 57 championship points. Michael Schumacher began alongside pole position winner Montoya on the grid's first row. Montoya led the opening 23 laps before the first round of pit stops, when Michael Schumacher took the lead but received a drive-through penalty for crossing the white line at the pit lane exit. Montoya regained the lead until a delayed second pit stop put Räikkönen into the lead following the second round of pit stops. Räikkönen led until he ran over oil from the Toyota of Allan McNish on lap 68, allowing Michael Schumacher to pass him and take the lead for the remaining five laps, securing his eighth victory of the season and 61st of his career.

Schumacher secured his fifth World Drivers' Championship title, equalling Juan Manuel Fangio's record set in 1957. Formula One individuals praised Michael Schumacher, including former champion Jody Scheckter and three-time world champion Niki Lauda. He also received official congratulations from world leaders Gerhard Schröder, Silvio Berlusconi and Carlo Azeglio Ciampi. Montoya moved from third to second in the World Drivers' Championship while Ferrari extended its World Constructors' Championship lead over Williams to 62 championship points.

== Background ==
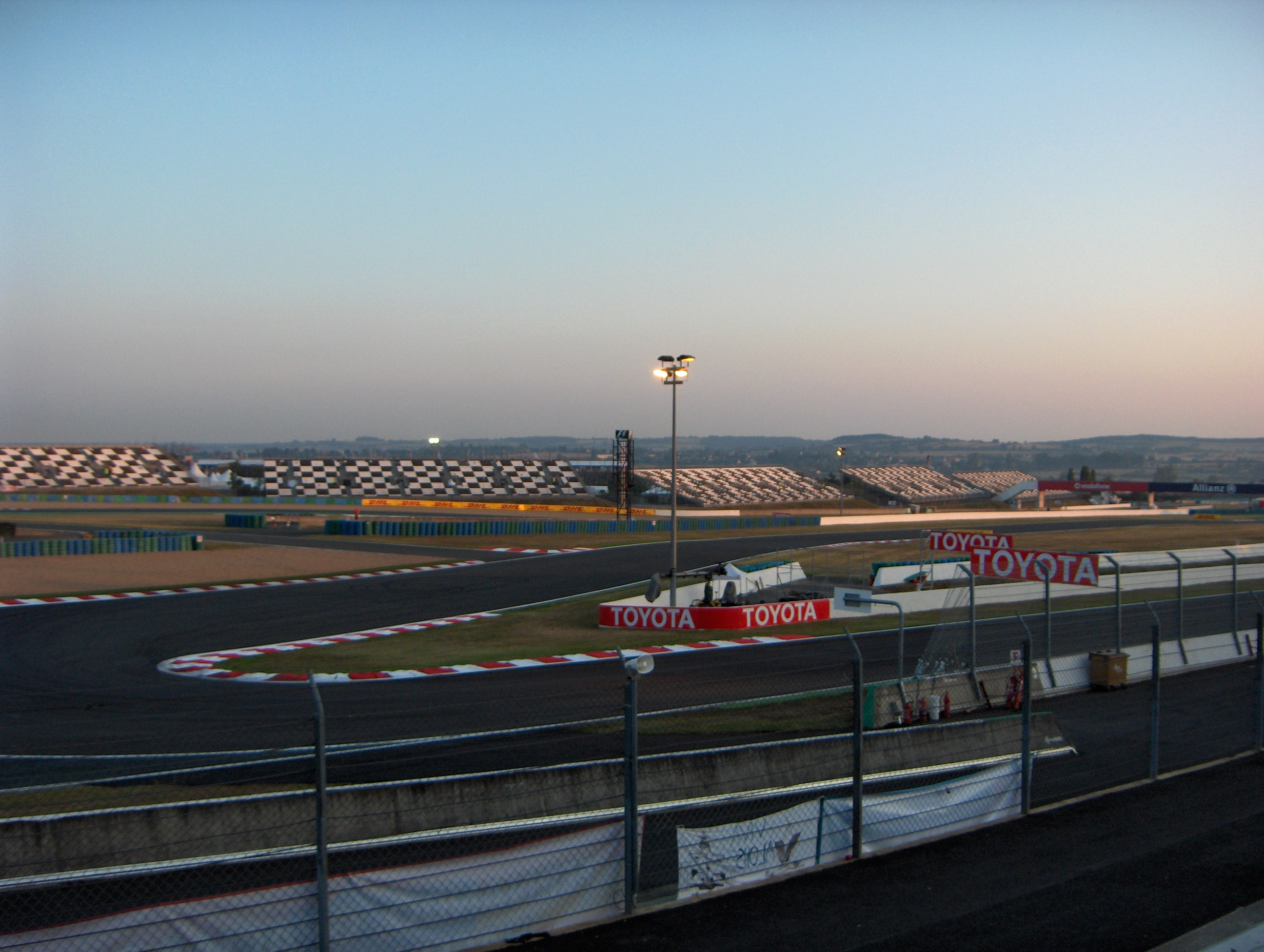
The Circuit de Nevers Magny-Cours (pictured in 2006), where the French Grand Prix was held.

The 2002 French Grand Prix was the 11th of 17 rounds in the 2002 Formula One World Championship, contested on 21 July 2002 at the 4.251 km (2.641 mi) clockwise Circuit de Nevers Magny-Cours in Magny-Cours, Burgundy, Central France, the 11th anniversary of the circuit hosting its maiden Formula One event in 1991. The race swapped places with the British Grand Prix to avoid a scheduling conflict with the 2002 FIFA World Cup finals in Japan and South Korea.

Ferrari's Michael Schumacher led the World Drivers' Championship with 86 championship points before the event, followed by his teammate Rubens Barrichello on 32 and Williams's Juan Pablo Montoya on 31. Montoya's teammate Ralf Schumacher was fourth with 30 championship points and McLaren's David Coulthard was fifth with 26 championship points. If Michael Schumacher won the race and both Barrichello and Montoya finished lower than third, he would have won five world championships, matching Juan Manuel Fangio's record. Ferrari led the World Constructors' Championship with 118 championship points, 57 ahead of Williams. McLaren were third with 37 championship points, with Renault fourth on 14 and Sauber fifth with 10.

Following the British Grand Prix on 7 July, in preparation for the French Grand Prix, the teams tested aerodynamic and car components, racing setups and tyres on four European circuits. The Arrows, Jordan, Renault. Sauber and Williams teams tested variously for four days at Spain's Circuit Ricardo Tormo. The British American Racing (BAR), Jaguar, Toyota and Williams teams all tested variously over a four-day period at Italy's Monza Circuit. Ferrari's race preparations included testing at two Italian racing tracks. Drivers Luca Badoer, Luciano Burti and Michael Schumacher spent five days testing at the Fiorano Circuit, while Badoer also tested at the Mugello Circuit. Minardi was the only team that did not test, remaining at their factory.

Michael Schumacher had won seven of the ten races so far in 2002 and was on the podium in every one. He indicated that he would try to win the championship at Magny-Cours since he wanted to win the French Grand Prix, but that it would be dependent on other drivers' actions and that it did not matter if the title fight continued at the following German Grand Prix. He indicated he would compete normally, but he did not expect to win the title in France, "Whether it happens here or at another time I don't think that it's really important to me. What matters to me is that it does happen in the end." Ross Brawn, Ferrari's technical director, stated that the team was concerned about a mechanical failure during a race.

There were eleven teams (each representing a different constructor) with two drivers each for the Grand Prix, with no changes from the season entry list. Arrows' participation in the event was jeopardised by outstanding debts to engine supplier Cosworth as it attempted to sell the team to Red Bull but this was prevented by major shareholder Morgan Grenfell. Arrows manager Tom Walkinshaw directed the team's transporters from Oxfordshire's Leafield factory to France on the evening of 16 July. Arrows' participation in the Grand Prix was ensured when Walkinshaw paid off the team's debt to Cosworth for a continued supply of engines the next day, before the noon deadline, having agreed a new payment plan with Cosworth to ensure the engine manufacturer was paid by the Wednesday. Ferrari combined the rear wing mounting point with the deformable structure above the gearbox and the extractor profile's upper part at the F2002 car's rear-end. Given the high temperatures expected during the race, Williams introduced large openings in the FW24's sidepods to enhance heat dissipation. Renault debuted a new improved version of their engine, as well as an aperture in the right side of the R202 cars to cool the right-hand side oil radiator.

== Practice ==
Two one-hour practice sessions on Friday and two 45-minute sessions on Saturday preceded the race. Arrows did not take part in the Friday practice sessions because Walkinshaw kept the two cars in the pit lane after being urged to do little while negotiating with shareholders Morgan Grenfell to persuade the bank to allow new prospective investors into the team.

The first practice session on Friday morning was held in hot, sunny weather. Barrichello set the fastest lap of 1:15.056 31 minutes in. Coulthard, Michael Schumacher, the Williams duo of Montoya and Ralf Schumacher, McLaren's Kimi Räikkönen, Renault's Jenson Button, the Jaguar duo Eddie Irvine and Pedro de la Rosa and Jordan's Takuma Sato completed the top ten. Some drivers lost control of their cars during the session. Toyota's Mika Salo was on a fast lap when Sato cut across him at the fast-right/left Imola turn. This meant Salo drove onto the run-off area but Sato's left-rear collided with Salo's right-front wheel because Sato did not yield for him. Salo returned slowly to the pit lane with front suspension damage but continued after checks by Toyota, despite damage to the car's steering.

The second practice session, which took place later in the afternoon, was sunny. Coulthard set the day's fastest lap of 1:14.025, 0.072 seconds quicker than his teammate Räikkönen. The Ferrari duo of Michael Schumacher and Barrichello as well as Ralf Schumacher, Irvine, Salo, De la Rosa Button and Montoya followed in positions third through tenth. Some drivers again went off the circuit. Less than four minutes in, Button's teammate Jarno Trulli took too much kerb through the Nurburgring chicane on his first run, causing him to lose control of his Renault's rear. Trulli controlled the slide but he nudged the tyre barrier at the run-off area's edge, prematurely ending his session. Montoya and Sato removed components from their cars in excursions across the gravel trap.

The third practice session on Saturday morning took place in sunny weather. Michael Schumacher was fastest with a time of 1:12.974 he set at the conclusion of the session and was the only driver to set a sub 1:13-lap. His teammate Barrichello was 0.529 seconds slower in second, followed by Räikkönen, his McLaren teammate Coulthard, Sauber's Felipe Massa, Montoya, Ralf Schumacher, Button, Massa's teammate Nick Heidfeld and BAR's Olivier Panis in positions three to ten.

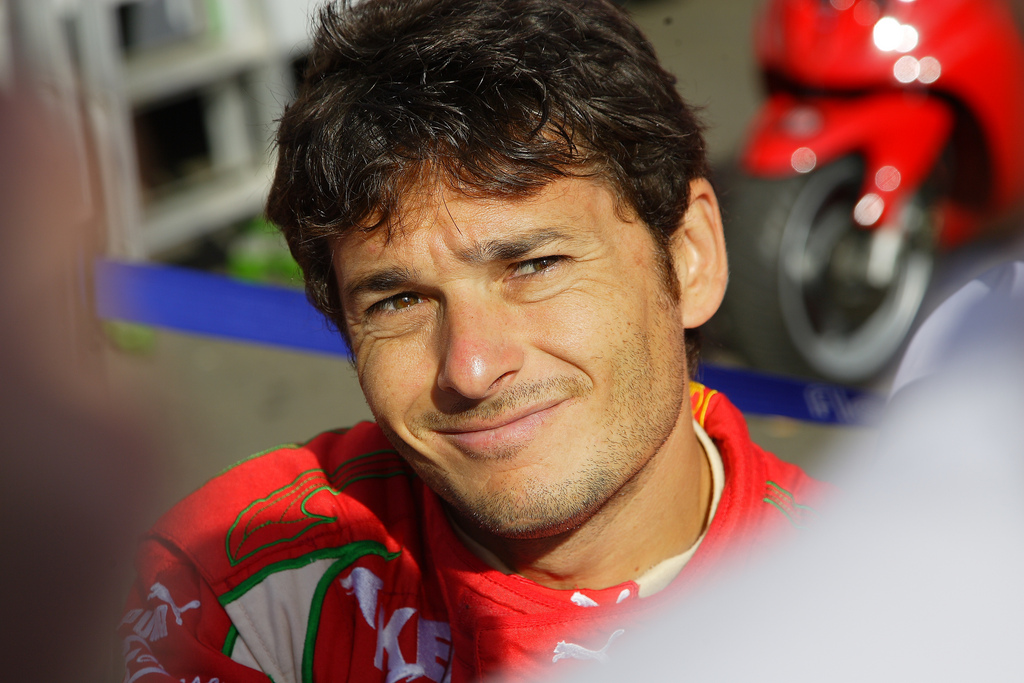
Giancarlo Fisichella (pictured in 2010) was withdrawn from the race by doctor Sid Watkins following a heavy accident in the final practice session.

Although he failed to lap faster in the final practice session, which took place in sunny weather, Michael Schumacher remained fastest overall after losing control of his Ferrari's rear heading towards the Adelaide hairpin. Räikkönen improved to second and his teammate Coulthard was third. Barrichello, Button, Montoya, Ralf Schumacher, Irvine, Heidfeld and Trulli followed in the top ten. Around 15 minutes in, Giancarlo Fisichella's front wing collapsed over the kerbs at the exit of the long fast right-hand Estoril corner early in the lap, folding under his Jordan car. lifting the front wheels into the air off the tarmac surface. He lost frontal downforce, and lost control of his car, striking the outside tyre barrier. Fisichella experienced a 125 mph (201 km/h) hit at 34 g_{0} (330 m/s^{2}), leaving him confused, dazed and with no recollection of the accident. Although the car was structurally intact, it sustained suspension damage, and practice was stopped for 26 minutes as marshals repaired the tyre wall.

Fisichella was left with a concussion, a cut finger, and a slightly stiff neck as a result of his crash. Sid Watkins, a doctor from the Fédération Internationale de l'Automobile (FIA), examined him at the circuit's medical centre before flying him to Nevers for a brain scan. Although hospital scans revealed no serious injuries, Watkins deemed Fisichella unfit to race, citing the risk of another major accident during the race because of the g-forces he experienced.

== Qualifying ==
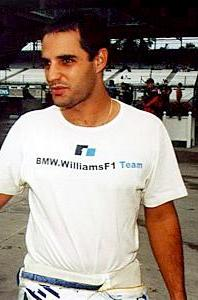
Juan Pablo Montoya secured his fifth consecutive pole position with the fastest lap time in the one-hour qualifying session.

Each driver was allowed twelve laps during Saturday's one-hour qualifying session, with starting positions determined by the drivers' quickest laps. During this session, the 107% rule was in effect, requiring each driver to remain within 107% of the quickest lap time in order to qualify for the race. Montoya and Ferrari's Michael Schumacher and Barrichello battled it out in qualifying, in hot and sunny weather, appearing to favour the Michelin-shod cars. Montoya secured his fifth successive pole position and sixth of the season with a 1:11.985 lap, the only driver to lap under 1:12 despite going wide at the final turn on his last quick lap. Michael Schumacher qualified second, 0.023 seconds behind, after losing time on his final run despite adjusting his Ferrari. He lost control of his Ferrari and cut across the gravel trap at the final chicane, invalidating his lap time. Michael Schumacher's third run was likewise invalidated for cutting the Nurburgring chicane. Barrichello, third, had his car modified in between sessions. Räikkönen made an error at the final corner, finishing fourth, his best qualifying result at the time, just slower than Barrichello. Ralf Schumacher, fifth, drove an unbalanced car and was unable to improve his lap when he slid entering the start/finish straight. Coulthard had an minor oversteer that improved during qualifying, taking sixth. The Renault duo qualified seventh and eighth. Button in seventh spent most of qualifying correcting oversteer and locking his tyres entering turn eight. For the third race in 2002, he qualified ahead of teammate Trulli, who was unable to push due to discomfort in his Renault on the limit. Irvine achieved his best qualifying result of 2002 at the time as well as Jaguar's first top ten starting position of the season in ninth. Heidfeld, tenth, was the final Bridgestone runner in the top ten. His team made minor tweaks to his racing setup for each run; Heidfeld had traffic on the second run.

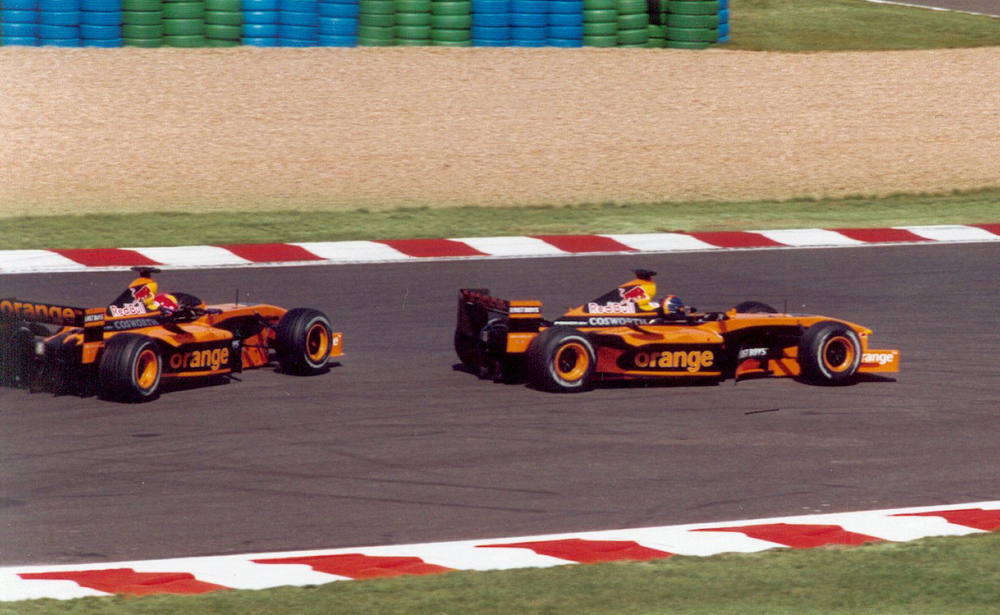
The Arrows team deliberately failed to qualify for the race amidst the team suffering from financial difficulties.

Panis, 11th, had poor balance and understeer, but set his best time on his final run after pushing hard. Massa lapped faster on each run after Sauber improved his car, securing 12th. BAR's Jacques Villeneuve, 13th, used the latest Honda engine for qualifying and was happy with how his car performed in slow turns. Sato was the only Jordan driver that qualified when Fisichella withdrew from the event, securing 14th. He was sent out early in qualifying because Jordan temperatures increases and he improved marginally with each lap. De la Rosa pulled over at the pit lane exit with a loss in hydraulic pressure affecting the car's throttle control. He moved to his spare Jaguar setup, but that had a front wheel sensor problem and a loss of power once it was rectified, leaving him 15th. The Toyota pair of Salo and Allan McNish qualified 16th and 17th. Salo had grip problems for most of qualifying, while McNish believed Toyota would be slightly more competitive in the session. Minardi teammates Mark Webber and Alex Yoong were the final qualifiers in 18th and 19th. Webber's car stopped right before the pit lane exit due to a fuel pressure issue, forcing him to drive the spare Minardi car setup for him. Yoong's car understeered and he lost time on his last runs due to a fuel delivery issue. Arrows made a token appearance in qualifying to meet contractual agreements with Formula One to participate in the event and to avoid FIA-imposed fines for missing rounds of the championship after completing one installation lap in the closing ten minutes of the final practice session; drivers Heinz-Harald Frentzen and Enrique Bernoldi intentionally failed to lap inside 107% of Montoya's pole position time when they slowed in the final third of the lap. Both drivers completed three laps each and Arrows left the track after qualifying.

=== Post-qualifying ===
Jordan sponsor Deutsche Post sought to persuade Frentzen to join Jordan because it wanted a German driver to replace Fisichella in the race. The FIA permitted this under force majeure as long as there were no contractual concerns and all teams agreed 15 minutes before the warm-up session, but Frentzen would have to begin from the back row per the sporting regulations. Although all of the teams agreed, Frentzen's lawyer advised him not to join Jordan because his management was concerned about legal consequences from Walkinshaw.

=== Qualifying classification ===
| Pos | No | Driver | Constructor | Lap | Gap | Grid |
|---|---|---|---|---|---|---|
| 1 | 6 | (Colombia) Juan Pablo Montoya | Williams-BMW | 1:11.985 | — | 1 |
| 2 | 1 | (Germany) Michael Schumacher | Ferrari | 1:12.008 | +0.023 | 2 |
| 3 | 2 | (Brazil) Rubens Barrichello | Ferrari | 1:12.197 | +0.212 | 3 |
| 4 | 4 | (Finland) Kimi Räikkönen | McLaren-Mercedes | 1:12.244 | +0.259 | 4 |
| 5 | 5 | (Germany) Ralf Schumacher | Williams-BMW | 1:12.424 | +0.439 | 5 |
| 6 | 3 | (United Kingdom) David Coulthard | McLaren-Mercedes | 1:12.498 | +0.513 | 6 |
| 7 | 15 | (United Kingdom) Jenson Button | Renault | 1:12.761 | +0.776 | 7 |
| 8 | 14 | (Italy) Jarno Trulli | Renault | 1:13.030 | +1.045 | 8 |
| 9 | 16 | (United Kingdom) Eddie Irvine | Jaguar-Cosworth | 1:13.188 | +1.203 | 9 |
| 10 | 7 | (Germany) Nick Heidfeld | Sauber-Petronas | 1:13.370 | +1.385 | 10 |
| 11 | 12 | (France) Olivier Panis | BAR-Honda | 1:13.457 | +1.472 | 11 |
| 12 | 8 | (Brazil) Felipe Massa | Sauber-Petronas | 1:13.501 | +1.516 | 12 |
| 13 | 11 | (Canada) Jacques Villeneuve | BAR-Honda | 1:13.506 | +1.521 | 13 |
| 14 | 10 | (Japan) Takuma Sato | Jordan-Honda | 1:13.542 | +1.557 | 14 |
| 15 | 17 | (Spain) Pedro de la Rosa | Jaguar-Cosworth | 1:13.656 | +1.671 | 15 |
| 16 | 24 | (Finland) Mika Salo | Toyota | 1:13.837 | +1.852 | 16 |
| 17 | 25 | (United Kingdom) Allan McNish | Toyota | 1:13.949 | +1.964 | 17 |
| 18 | 23 | (Australia) Mark Webber | Minardi-Asiatech | 1:14.800 | +2.815 | 18 |
| 19 | 22 | (Malaysia) Alex Yoong | Minardi-Asiatech | 1:16.798 | +4.813 | 19 |
107% time: 1:17.023
| DNQ | 20 | (Germany) Heinz-Harald Frentzen | Arrows-Cosworth | 1:18.497 | +6.512 | — |
| DNQ | 21 | (Brazil) Enrique Bernoldi | Arrows-Cosworth | 1:19.843 | +7.858 | — |
| DNQ | 9 | (Italy) Giancarlo Fisichella | Jordan-Honda | — | — | — |

== Warm-up ==
On race morning, a half-hour warm-up session was held for teams to shake down their race and spare cars in dry and fine weather. Michael Schumacher set the fastest lap time of 1:14.174 towards the end of warm-up. His teammate Barrichello was 0.714 seconds slower in second. Trulli, Massa, Heidfeld, Button, Räikkönen, Irvine, Coulthard and Panis rounded out the top ten. Sato's race car briefly stalled at the pit lane exit due to a launch control system failure after pressing the wrong button on the steering wheel. Ralf Schumacher spun twice during the session, firstly at the Chateau d'Eau turn and then at the Adelaide hairpin.

== Race ==
The 72-lap race began at 14:00 local time in slightly overcast conditions that later brightened. The air temperature was between 24 and 27 °C (75 and 81 °F) and the track temperature was at 38 °C (100 °F). There was an attendance of 106,000 spectators. Michael Schumacher chose to start in the spare Ferrari, believing it handled better than his race car. Following Fisichella's withdrawal and the Arrows team's failure to qualify, 19 cars were scheduled to start, but at the start of the formation lap, Barrichello's Ferrari remained on the front jack on the starting grid due to an unidentified electrical failure. A steering wheel replacement and an effort by the mechanics to restart Barrichello's car failed to correct the problem, thus his Ferrari was pushed into the pit lane, and Barrichello did not start the race. This resulted in 18 starters, the fewest since the 1975 Monaco Grand Prix.

When the race began, Montoya cut across Michael Schumacher to keep the lead into the first corner. Massa made a brisk start, moving from 12th to seventh, however, he jumped the start after prematurely releasing his launch control system. Massa turned sharply to the left to avoid colliding with teammate Heidfeld. Sato tried to pass Panis further back, but they collided and ended up in the gravel trap at the first turn. De la Rosa also entered the gravel trap to avoid striking Panis and Sato. Michael Schumacher was close behind Montoya and began pressuring him for the lead. At the conclusion of the first lap, Montoya led Michael Schumacher by 0.4 seconds, followed by Räikkönen, Ralf Schumacher, Coulthard and Button. Panis entered the pit lane for a new front wing and tyres. On lap three, Michael Schumacher tried to pass Montoya on the outside at the Adelaide hairpin but was driven wide. Räikkönen drew in-between both Montoya and Michael Schumacher, taking the optimal line out of the hairpin, but Schumacher cut him off at the Nurburgring turn to held second.

Following that, Montoya drove defensively but was able to open up a small lead over Michael Schumacher with to the BMW engine's power, while Räikkönen remained close behind Schumacher. On lap six, Massa was issued a drive-through penalty for jumping the start. He took the penalty two laps later. When Massa left the pit lane, he crossed the white line dividing the pit lane exit from the circuit to stay ahead of Sato. Yoong spun at the Adelaide hairpin on lap eight but continued. Two laps later, Massa received a second drive-through penalty for crossing the white line at the pit lane exit, which he immediately took. Villeneuve battled McNish for 11th on lap 13 when he locked the brakes entering the Adelaide hairpin but avoided colliding with him.

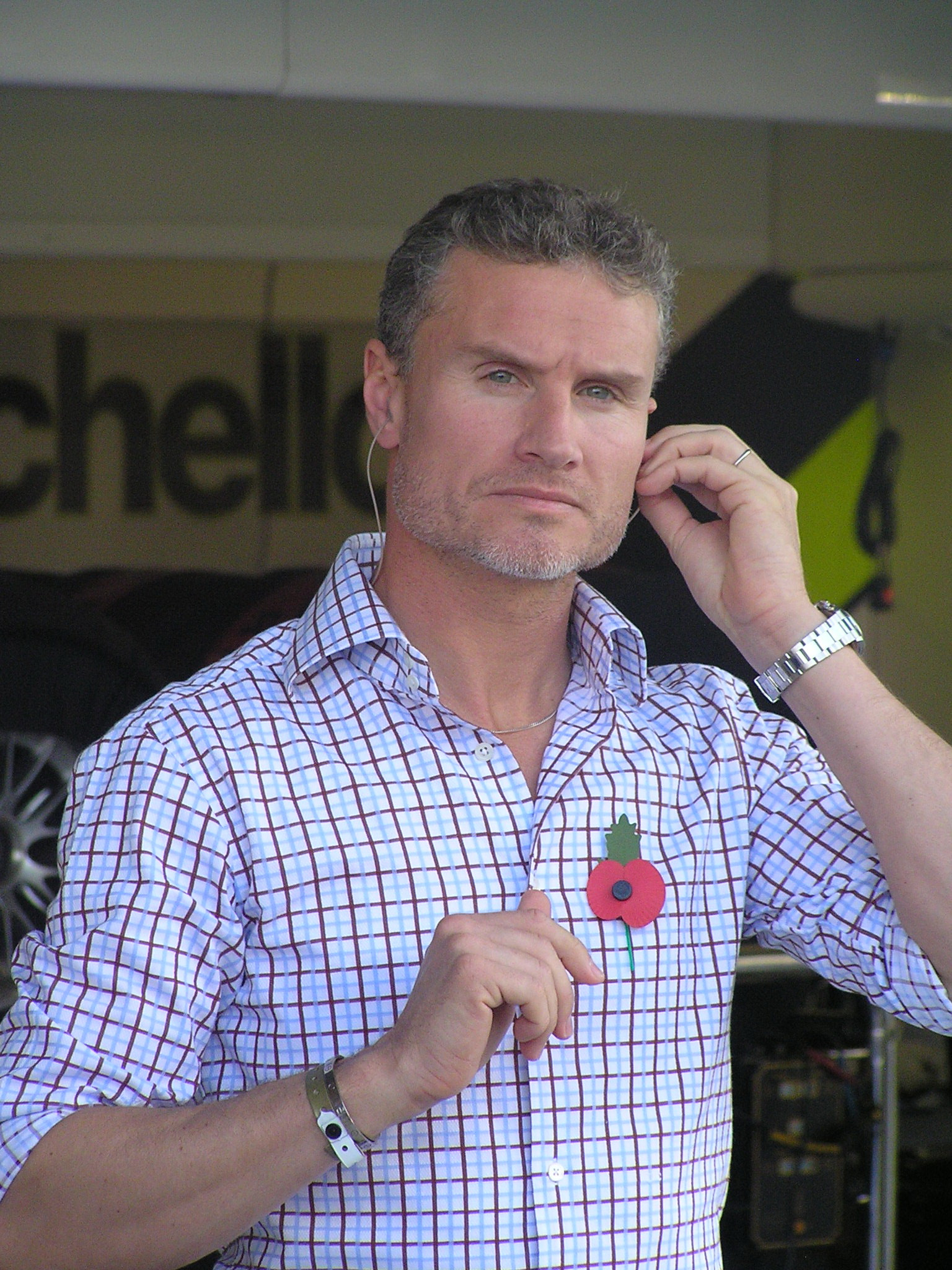
David Coulthard (pictured in 2009) finished in third place

The first round of pit stops began on lap 20. All leading drivers planned for two stops whereas Renault planned for three. Button, who was sixth, was the first of the leaders to make a 9.6-second pit stop, dropping him to ninth. Ralf Schumacher's first stop came two laps later. He was stationary for 7.2 seconds, falling behind Coulthard. On lap 24, Montoya made his first pit stop from the lead, and Michael Schumacher took the lead. His 8.4-second stop for a used pair of tyres dropped him to fourth, ahead of teammate Ralf Schumacher. Sato understeered across the gravel trap and into the tyre barrier at Lycee corner after narrowly avoiding striking De la Rosa, which put him off the racing line, causing him to become stuck in the gravel trap and retire.

Michael Schumacher pushed his pace at the front to get ahead of Montoya after his first scheduled pit stop. Although a Jaguar baulked him, he entered the pit lane on lap 26 for a 8.4-second stop. Michael Schumacher resumed the circuit in third, trailing the yet-to-pit McLarens but just ahead of Montoya. When he returned to the racing line, his right-front wheel crossed the white pit lane exit line. The McLaren pair of Räikkönen and Coulthard made their pit stops on laps 27 and 28, returning Michael Schumacher to the lead. On lap 32, Panis entered the BAR garage to retire with car damage and concerns with a bad vibration that BAR was unable to trace. While Michael Schumacher was expanding his lead over Montoya by about a second per lap in clear air, the stewards issued a drive-through penalty on him for crossing the pit lane exit line rejoining the circuit on lap 34. Michael Schumacher served the penalty on lap 35, dropping to third behind Montoya and just behind Räikkönen but ahead of Ralf Schumacher. On lap 37, Villeneuve went off onto the grass, smoke streaming from his car's back due to an engine failure.

At half distance, the first five drivers were separated by 3.5 seconds, but this increased to 4.4 seconds after 40 laps. On lap 42, both Räikkönen and Michael Schumacher were lapping McNish with Schumacher pressuring Räikkönen. He used the situation to go between McNish and Räikkönen, attempting to pass Räikkönen on the inside at the Adelaide hairpin but failing. On the following lap, Montoya made his second pit stop from the lead, beginning in the second round of stops. He stopped for 11.6 seconds, and his car stuttered as he drove away, dropping to sixth and promoting Räikkönen to the lead. Ralf Schumacher made his second pit stop from fourth on lap 44, crossing the pit lane exit line. At the front, Räikkönen and Michael Schumacher replied by instantly increasing their pace, with Räikkönen matching Schumacher's pace. Ferrari was ready for Michael Schumacher's second pit stop on lap 47, but he stayed on the circuit for another lap before entering the pit lane. He fell to third, behind Coulthard. Ralf Schumacher received a drive-through penalty for crossing the pit lane exit line on lap 49.

On lap 49, Räikkönen made his second pit stop from the lead. His 8.7-second stop saw him drop to second, behind teammate Coulthard but just ahead of Michael Schumacher. Räikkönen held off challenges on his out-lap from Michael Schumacher to keep second. On lap 50, Massa stopped in the pit lane with a gearbox-related issue, while Trulli retired at the side of the circuit with an engine failure. Salo also pulled off, with flames and fire pouring from the car's rear. On lap 53, Irvine's rear wing failed at 170 mph (270 km/h) due to collapsed end plates on the lower element, spinning into the gravel trap at the Adelaide hairpin under braking because he lost rear downforce without the rear wing. Irvine exited his Jaguar unhurt but retired. Coulthard made his second pit stop from the lead on lap 54. His 7.7-second stop dropped him to third, trailing teammate Räikkönen and just behind Michael Schumacher but his wheel crossed the pit lane exit line.

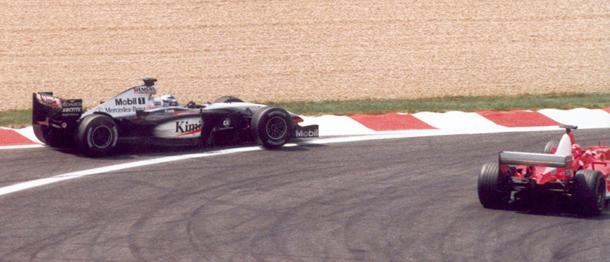
The decisive moment of the race where Kimi Räikkönen ran wide, allowing Michael Schumacher to pass him for the lead.

Montoya and Ralf Schumacher of Williams had dropped back from the front three as Montoya suffered with tyre wear, cause Ralf Schumacher to close in and challenge his teammate. On lap 58, the stewards issued Coulthard a drive-through penalty for breaching the pit lane exit line while he was pressuring Michael Schumacher. Coulthard took the penalty on lap 59 but remained in third, ahead of the two Williams drivers. On lap 62, he set a new track race lap record of 1:15.045 in an attempt to close up but was too far back to challenge for the win. McNish spun into the run-off area at the Adelaide hairpin and was facing the opposite direction after an engine issue caused him to retire on lap 68. Marshals were waving yellow flags to warn drivers of McNish's car, which had beached on the hairpin's apex, but none to warn of oil dropped by the Toyota entering the hairpin. Räikkönen failed to notice McNish's oil and ran over it, causing him to lock his brakes while attempting to maintain control of his McLaren and running off the racing line in a wide arc and went far off the racing surface. Michael Schumacher also ran onto the oil but controlled his Ferrari as he was further back as to not run over it as much as Räikkönen had. He drew alongside Räikkönen on the inside and accelerated earlier than him to claim the race lead, ending Räikkönen's chance to achieve his first victory.

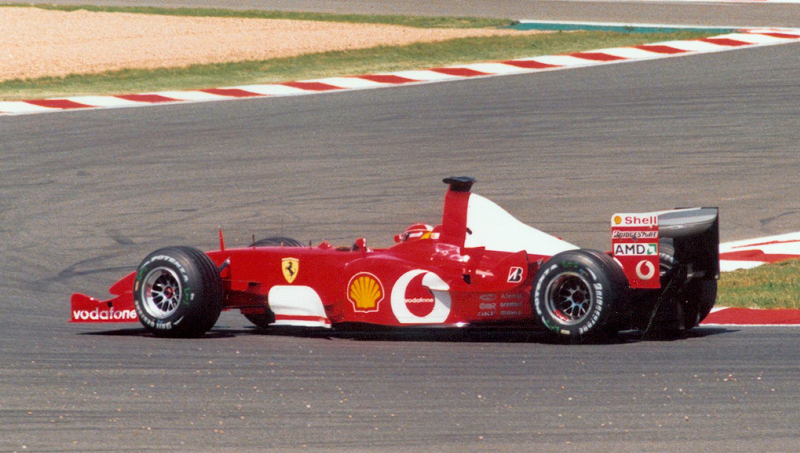
This race saw Michael Schumacher clinch his fifth world championship title, equalling Juan Manuel Fangio's record set in 1957.

Michael Schumacher asked Brawn on the radio if he had passed Räikkönen under yellow flags and if he should let Räikkönen back by, but was told no. Räikkönen remained close behind Michael Schumacher, but Schumacher held on for the final five laps to claim his eighth victory in the season's 11 races and 61st of his career. Michael Schumacher won the 2002 Drivers' Championship as Montoya could not catch his championship points total in the six remaining races, equalling Fangio's record of five world titles. He also broke Nigel Mansell's ten-year record of winning the championship with the most Grands Prix remaining in a season. Räikkönen finished second, 1.104 seconds behind, his best result of the season. Coulthard finished third in a McLaren with understeer. Montoya was fourth due to balance and a reduction in grip as the race progressed, ahead of his teammate Ralf Schumacher in fifth. Button's three-stop strategy helped him earn the last championship point by finishing sixth. Heidfeld finished seventh despite losing time due to an early-race traction control system failure and a gearbox electronics issue. Webber and Yoong of Minardi had hydraulic and fuel circuit pressure issues, but they finished eighth and tenth due to the team's aggressive race strategy, with Jaguar's De la Rosa in ninth.

=== Post-race ===
The top three drivers appeared on the podium to collect their trophies and spoke to the media in the subsequent press conference. Michael Schumacher described his feeling that the final five laps were "the worst five laps I have had in my career because the weight was on my shoulders, the pressure was on not to make mistakes and not do anything wrong." He added, "I was just so glad that we have achieved this together with a tremendous team, with people behind who you can just love and can just admire with the effort that they put in, the workload, the motivation they have." Räikkönen praised his McLaren and the team for their work during the pit stops. He admitted he was at fault for losing his maiden victory, "It was the most disappointing race of my life but that's the way it goes, and next time I hope we can win." Coulthard remarked that he did not expect McLaren to be duelling for the lead and was astonished by their pace relative to the Williams squad in the race's opening laps, adding, "Just looking at the laps from the end, where our fastest laps are and everything, it is all quite close. It does surprise me."

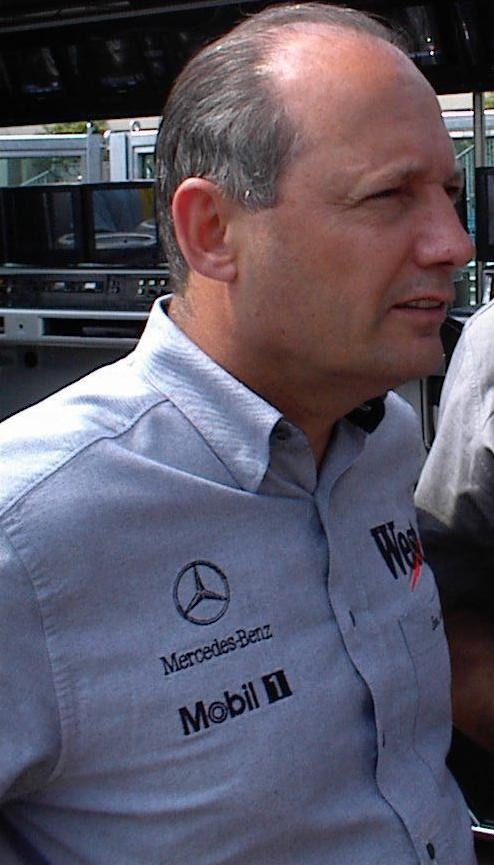
Comments made by McLaren CEO Ron Dennis (pictured in 2000) led the stewards to investigate the overtaking manoevure on Räikkönen by Michael Schumacher.

McLaren CEO Ron Dennis accused Michael Schumacher of passing Räikkönen in a yellow flag zone at the Adelaide hairpin before moving into a green flag zone. Dennis' comments drew the attention of the FIA stewards even though he did not register an official complaint. Race director Charlie Whiting was concerned that Michael Schumacher had passed Räikkönen under yellow flags, therefore Schumacher, a Ferrari member, Dennis and Räikkönen were summoned to the stewards' office to discuss the manoeuvre. The stewards reviewed video footage of the pass and spoke with the drivers and their representatives. While the stewards accepted Michael Schumacher passed Räikkönen in a yellow flag area, they assessed Räikkönen to be off the track, and no further action was required, thereby confirming Schumacher's fifth title win two hours after the race. McLaren issued a statement accepting the stewards' ruling but sought clarification on the rules about overtaking under yellow flags.

Gerhard Schröder, the Chancellor of Germany, officially congratulated Michael Schumacher for his championship win in a telegram, calling it "A fantastic victory in an already unique career." Carlo Azeglio Ciampi, the Italian president and the prime minister Silvio Berlusconi also praised Michael Schumacher, noting his success was aided by Italian engineering. Three-time world champion Niki Lauda and 1979 world champion Jody Scheckter heralded Michael Schumacher as the greatest Formula One driver. Church bells in Maranello, the Italian town where Ferrari's headquarters are based, were rang by the parish priest with 600 fans celebrating Schumacher's accomplishment. Celebrations by German and Italian fans were reported on Adriatic Sea beaches. Ferrari president Luca di Montezemolo flew to France to organise a celebration of Schumacher's title victory.

Barrichello left the track quickly because he was angry over his failure to start. He said, "We will have to investigate the problem to find the cause, but in my opinion it was a different problem to the one I experienced at Silverstone." Montoya stated that he was losing grip in a car he found difficult to drive as the race progressed. Williams chief operations director Sam Michael said that the team's tyre choice appeared to be an error and their race performance was "not enough." Button commented on his sixth-place finish, "It's good to score another point for Renault, and particularly here in France. I was managing to keep up with the leaders at the start of the race, even though I had a little less fuel onboard."

The race result left Michael Schumacher as the World Drivers' Champion with 96 championship points. Montoya's fourth-place finish moved him from third to second while Barrichello's failure to start dropped him from second to third. Ralf Schumacher remained fourth while Coulthard stayed fifth. Ferrari maintained its lead in the World Constructors' Championship with 128 championship points, strengthening their lead over second-placed Williams by five championship points. McLaren remained in third with 47 championship points, ahead of Renault on 15 and Sauber on 10 with six rounds remaining in the season.

=== Race classification ===
Drivers who scored championship points are denoted in bold.

| Pos | No | Driver | Constructor | Tyre | Laps | Time/Retired | Grid | Points |
|---|---|---|---|---|---|---|---|---|
| 1 | 1 | (Germany) **Michael Schumacher** | **Ferrari** | B | 72 | 1:32:09.837 | 2 | 10 |
| 2 | 4 | (Finland) **Kimi Räikkönen** | **McLaren-Mercedes** | M | 72 | +1.104 | 4 | 6 |
| 3 | 3 | (United Kingdom) **David Coulthard** | **McLaren-Mercedes** | M | 72 | +31.975 | 6 | 4 |
| 4 | 6 | (Colombia) **Juan Pablo Montoya** | **Williams-BMW** | M | 72 | +40.675 | 1 | 3 |
| 5 | 5 | (Germany) **Ralf Schumacher** | **Williams-BMW** | M | 72 | +41.772 | 5 | 2 |
| 6 | 15 | (United Kingdom) **Jenson Button** | **Renault** | M | 71 | +1 lap | 7 | 1 |
| 7 | 7 | (Germany) Nick Heidfeld | Sauber-Petronas | B | 71 | +1 lap | 10 | |
| 8 | 23 | (Australia) Mark Webber | Minardi-Asiatech | M | 71 | +1 lap | 18 | |
| 9 | 17 | (Spain) Pedro de la Rosa | Jaguar-Cosworth | M | 70 | +2 laps | 15 | |
| 10 | 22 | (Malaysia) Alex Yoong | Minardi-Asiatech | M | 68 | +4 laps | 19 | |
| 11 | 25 | (United Kingdom) Allan McNish | Toyota | M | 65 | Engine | 17 | |
| Ret | 16 | (United Kingdom) Eddie Irvine | Jaguar-Cosworth | M | 52 | Rear wing | 9 | |
| Ret | 14 | (Italy) Jarno Trulli | Renault | M | 49 | Engine | 8 | |
| Ret | 8 | (Brazil) Felipe Massa | Sauber-Petronas | B | 48 | Transmission | 12 | |
| Ret | 24 | (Finland) Mika Salo | Toyota | M | 48 | Engine | 16 | |
| Ret | 11 | (Canada) Jacques Villeneuve | BAR-Honda | B | 35 | Engine | 13 | |
| Ret | 12 | (France) Olivier Panis | BAR-Honda | B | 29 | Collision damage | 11 | |
| Ret | 10 | (Japan) Takuma Sato | Jordan-Honda | B | 23 | Spin | 14 | |
| DNS | 2 | (Brazil) Rubens Barrichello | Ferrari | B | — | Ignition | 3 | |
| DNQ | 20 | (Germany) Heinz-Harald Frentzen | Arrows-Cosworth | B | — | 107% rule | — | |
| DNQ | 21 | (Brazil) Enrique Bernoldi | Arrows-Cosworth | B | — | 107% rule | — | |
| DNQ | 9 | (Italy) Giancarlo Fisichella | Jordan-Honda | B | — | Injury | — | |

== Championship standings after the race ==
Drivers' Championship standings

| +/– | Pos | Driver | Points |
|---|---|---|---|
| | 1 | (Germany) Michael Schumacher* | 96 |
| 1 | 2 | (Colombia) Juan Pablo Montoya | 34 |
| 1 | 3 | (Brazil) Rubens Barrichello | 32 |
| | 4 | (Germany) Ralf Schumacher | 32 |
| | 5 | (United Kingdom) David Coulthard | 30 |

Constructors' Championship standings

| +/– | Pos | Constructor | Points |
|---|---|---|---|
| | 1 | (Italy) Ferrari* | 128 |
| | 2 | (United Kingdom) Williams-BMW* | 66 |
| | 3 | (United Kingdom) McLaren-Mercedes* | 47 |
| | 4 | (France) Renault | 15 |
| | 5 | (Switzerland) Sauber-Petronas | 10 |
Sources:

- Note: Only the top five positions are included for both sets of standings.
- Bold text and an asterisk indicates competitors who still had a theoretical chance of becoming World Champion.

| Previous race: 2002 British Grand Prix | FIA Formula One World Championship; 2002 season | Next race: 2002 German Grand Prix |
| Previous race: 2001 French Grand Prix | French Grand Prix | Next race: 2003 French Grand Prix |
