= Cosworth CR =

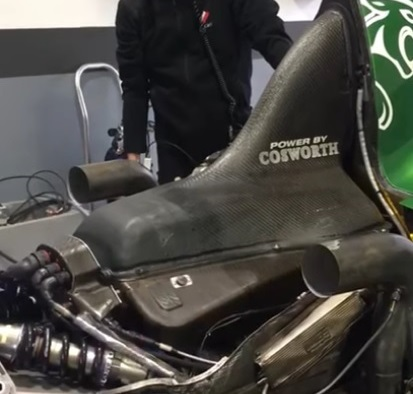

Overview
- Manufacturer: (United Kingdom) Ford-Cosworth
- Production: 1999–2005

Layout
- Configuration: 72°-90° V10
- Displacement: 3.0 L (183 cu in)
- Cylinder bore: 94 mm (3.7 in); 95 mm (3.7 in); 96 mm (3.8 in)
- Piston stroke: 43.2 mm (1.7 in); 42.3 mm (1.7 in); 41.4 mm (1.6 in)
- Cylinder block material: Aluminum alloy
- Cylinder head material: Aluminum alloy
- Valvetrain: 40-valve, DOHC, four-valves per cylinder

Combustion
- Turbocharger: No
- Fuel system: Multi-point electronic fuel injection
- Management: Cosworth ECU
- Oil system: Dry sump

Output
- Power output: 790–900 hp (589–671 kW)
- Torque output: approx. 260–290 lb⋅ft (353–393 N⋅m)

Dimensions
- Dry weight: 94–105 kg (207–231 lb)

Chronology
- Predecessor: Cosworth JD / VJ engine
- Successor: Cosworth TJ / CA engine

The Cosworth CR is a series of 3.0-litre, naturally-aspirated V10 Formula One engines, designed by Cosworth in partnership and collaboration with Ford; used between 1999 and 2005. The customer engines were used by Stewart, Jaguar, Arrows, Jordan, and Minardi.

== Overview ==
The Stewart Grand Prix team effectively became the Ford works team, and used Cosworth CR-1 engines from its first season in 1997, which was a much lighter version of VJM, ultimately reaching 770 bhp at 16,500 rpm by 2001. Over the next few years Ford had increased its involvement with the Stewart team, and finally bought the team, renaming it Jaguar Racing for 2000. Jaguar pulled out of F1 at the end of 2004, but the team (renamed Red Bull Racing) continued to use Cosworth V10 engines until switching to a Ferrari V8 for 2006. Minardi also used re-badged Cosworth engines until 2005.

== Complete Formula One results ==
(key)

Year	Entrant	Chassis	Engine	Tyres	Drivers	1	2	3	4	5	6	7	8	9	10	11	12	13	14	15	16	17	18	19	Points	WCC
1999	HSBC Stewart Ford	Stewart SF3	Ford CR-1 3.0 V10	B		AUS	BRA	SMR	MON	ESP	CAN	FRA	GBR	AUT	GER	HUN	BEL	ITA	EUR	MAL	JPN				36	4th
1999	HSBC Stewart Ford	Stewart SF3	Ford CR-1 3.0 V10	B	(Brazil) Rubens Barrichello	5	Ret	3	9	DSQ	Ret	3	8	Ret	Ret	5	10	4	3	5	8				36	4th
1999	HSBC Stewart Ford	Stewart SF3	Ford CR-1 3.0 V10	B	(United Kingdom) Johnny Herbert	DNS	Ret	10	Ret	Ret	5	Ret	12	14	11	11	Ret	Ret	1	4	7				36	4th
2000	Jaguar Racing F1 Team	Jaguar R1	Cosworth CR-2 3.0 V10	B		AUS	BRA	SMR	GBR	ESP	EUR	MON	CAN	FRA	AUT	GER	HUN	BEL	ITA	USA	JPN	MAL			4	9th
2000	Jaguar Racing F1 Team	Jaguar R1	Cosworth CR-2 3.0 V10	B	(United Kingdom) Eddie Irvine	Ret	Ret	7	13	11	Ret	4	13	13	PO	10	8	10	Ret	7	8	6			4	9th
2000	Jaguar Racing F1 Team	Jaguar R1	Cosworth CR-2 3.0 V10	B	(Brazil) Luciano Burti										11										4	9th
2000	Jaguar Racing F1 Team	Jaguar R1	Cosworth CR-2 3.0 V10	B	(United Kingdom) Johnny Herbert	Ret	Ret	10	12	13	11^{†}	9	Ret	Ret	7	Ret	Ret	8	Ret	11	7	Ret			4	9th
2001	Jaguar Racing F1 Team	Jaguar R2	Cosworth CR-3 3.0 V10	M		AUS	MAL	BRA	SMR	ESP	AUT	MON	CAN	EUR	FRA	GBR	GER	HUN	BEL	ITA	USA	JPN			9	8th
2001	Jaguar Racing F1 Team	Jaguar R2	Cosworth CR-3 3.0 V10	M	(United Kingdom) Eddie Irvine	11	Ret	Ret	Ret	Ret	7	3	Ret	7	Ret	9	Ret	Ret	DNS	Ret	5	Ret			9	8th
2001	Jaguar Racing F1 Team	Jaguar R2	Cosworth CR-3 3.0 V10	M	(Brazil) Luciano Burti	8	10	Ret	11																9	8th
2001	Jaguar Racing F1 Team	Jaguar R2	Cosworth CR-3 3.0 V10	M	(Spain) Pedro de la Rosa					Ret	Ret	Ret	6	8	14	12	Ret	11	Ret	5	12	Ret			9	8th
2002	Jaguar Racing F1 Team	Jaguar R3 Jaguar R3B	Cosworth CR-3 3.0 V10 Cosworth CR-4 3.0 V10	M		AUS	MAL	BRA	SMR	ESP	AUT	MON	CAN	EUR	GBR	FRA	GER	HUN	BEL	ITA	USA	JPN			8	7th
2002	Jaguar Racing F1 Team	Jaguar R3 Jaguar R3B	Cosworth CR-3 3.0 V10 Cosworth CR-4 3.0 V10	M	(United Kingdom) Eddie Irvine	4	Ret	7	Ret	Ret	Ret	9	Ret	Ret	Ret	Ret	Ret	Ret	6	3	10	9			8	7th
2002	Jaguar Racing F1 Team	Jaguar R3 Jaguar R3B	Cosworth CR-3 3.0 V10 Cosworth CR-4 3.0 V10	M	(Spain) Pedro de la Rosa	8	10	8	Ret	Ret	Ret	10	Ret	11	11	9	Ret	13	Ret	Ret	Ret	Ret			8	7th
2002	Orange Arrows	Arrows A23	Cosworth CR-3 3.0 V10 Cosworth CR-4 3.0 V10	B	(Germany) Heinz-Harald Frentzen	DSQ	11	Ret	Ret	6	11	6	13	13	Ret	DNQ	Ret								2	11th
2002	Orange Arrows	Arrows A23	Cosworth CR-3 3.0 V10 Cosworth CR-4 3.0 V10	B	(Brazil) Enrique Bernoldi	DSQ	Ret	Ret	Ret	Ret	Ret	12	Ret	10	Ret	DNQ	Ret								2	11th
2003	Jaguar Racing F1 Team	Jaguar R4	Cosworth CR-5 3.0 V10	M		AUS	MAL	BRA	SMR	ESP	AUT	MON	CAN	EUR	FRA	GBR	GER	HUN	ITA	USA	JPN				18	7th
2003	Jaguar Racing F1 Team	Jaguar R4	Cosworth CR-5 3.0 V10	M	(Australia) Mark Webber	Ret	Ret	9^{†}	Ret	7	7	Ret	7	6	6	14	11^{†}	6	7	Ret	11				18	7th
2003	Jaguar Racing F1 Team	Jaguar R4	Cosworth CR-5 3.0 V10	M	(Brazil) Antônio Pizzonia	13^{†}	Ret	Ret	14	Ret	9	Ret	10^{†}	10	10	Ret									18	7th
2003	Jaguar Racing F1 Team	Jaguar R4	Cosworth CR-5 3.0 V10	M	(United Kingdom) Justin Wilson												Ret	Ret	Ret	8	13				18	7th
2003	B&H Jordan Ford	Jordan EJ13	Ford RS1 3.0 V10	B	(Italy) Giancarlo Fisichella	12^{†}	Ret	1	15^{†}	Ret	Ret	10	Ret	12	Ret	Ret	13^{†}	Ret	10	7	Ret				13	9th
2003	B&H Jordan Ford	Jordan EJ13	Ford RS1 3.0 V10	B	(Republic of Ireland) Ralph Firman	Ret	10	Ret	Ret	8	11	12	Ret	11	15	13	Ret			Ret	14				13	9th
2003	B&H Jordan Ford	Jordan EJ13	Ford RS1 3.0 V10	B	(Hungary) Zsolt Baumgartner													Ret	11						13	9th
2003	European Minardi F1 Team	Minardi PS03	Cosworth CR-3 3.0 V10	B	(United Kingdom) Justin Wilson	Ret	Ret	Ret	Ret	11	13	Ret	Ret	13	14	16									0	10th
2003	European Minardi F1 Team	Minardi PS03	Cosworth CR-3 3.0 V10	B	(Denmark) Nicolas Kiesa												12	13	12	11	16				0	10th
2003	European Minardi F1 Team	Minardi PS03	Cosworth CR-3 3.0 V10	B	(Netherlands) Jos Verstappen	11	13	Ret	Ret	12	Ret	Ret	9	14	16	15	Ret	12	Ret	10	15				0	10th
2004	Jaguar Racing F1 Team	Jaguar R5 Jaguar R5B	Cosworth CR-6 3.0 V10	M		AUS	MAL	BHR	SMR	ESP	MON	EUR	CAN	USA	FRA	GBR	GER	HUN	BEL	ITA	CHN	JPN	BRA		10	7th
2004	Jaguar Racing F1 Team	Jaguar R5 Jaguar R5B	Cosworth CR-6 3.0 V10	M	(Australia) Mark Webber	Ret	Ret	8	13	12	Ret	7	Ret	Ret	9	8	6	10	Ret	9	10	Ret	Ret		10	7th
2004	Jaguar Racing F1 Team	Jaguar R5 Jaguar R5B	Cosworth CR-6 3.0 V10	M	(Austria) Christian Klien	11	10	14	14	Ret	Ret	12	9	Ret	11	14	10	13	6	13	Ret	12	14		10	7th
2004	Jordan Ford	Jordan EJ14	Ford RS2 3.0 V10	B	(Germany) Nick Heidfeld	Ret	Ret	15	Ret	Ret	7	10	8	Ret	16	15	Ret	12	11	14	13	13	Ret		5	9th
2004	Jordan Ford	Jordan EJ14	Ford RS2 3.0 V10	B	(Italy) Giorgio Pantano	14	13	16	Ret	Ret	Ret	13		Ret	17	Ret	15	Ret	Ret	Ret					5	9th
2004	Jordan Ford	Jordan EJ14	Ford RS2 3.0 V10	B	(Germany) Timo Glock								7								15	15	15		5	9th
2004	Minardi F1 Team	Minardi PS04B	Cosworth CR-3L 3.0 V10	B	(Italy) Gianmaria Bruni	Ret	14	17	Ret	Ret	Ret	14	Ret	Ret	18^{†}	16	17	14	Ret	Ret	Ret	16	17		1	10th
2004	Minardi F1 Team	Minardi PS04B	Cosworth CR-3L 3.0 V10	B	(Hungary) Zsolt Baumgartner	Ret	16	Ret	15	Ret	9	15	10	8	Ret	Ret	16	15	Ret	15	16	Ret	16		1	10th
2005	Minardi F1 Team	Minardi PS04B	Cosworth CR-3L 3.0 V10	B		AUS	MAL	BHR	SMR	ESP	MON	EUR	CAN	USA	FRA	GBR	GER	HUN	TUR	ITA	BEL	BRA	JPN	CHN	7*	10th
2005	Minardi F1 Team	Minardi PS04B	Cosworth CR-3L 3.0 V10	B	(Austria) Patrick Friesacher	17	Ret	12																	7*	10th
2005	Minardi F1 Team	Minardi PS04B	Cosworth CR-3L 3.0 V10	B	(Netherlands) Christijan Albers	Ret	13	13																	7*	10th

* All points scored with the Cosworth TJ2005 engine.
