= 2002 Brazilian Grand Prix =

Coordinates: 23°42′13″S 46°41′59″W

Race 3 of 17 in the 2002 Formula One World Championship
← Previous race	Next race →

Race details
- Date: 31 March 2002
- Official name: 2002 Grande Prêmio do Brasil
- Location: Autódromo José Carlos Pace, São Paulo, Brazil
- Course: Permanent Racing Facility
- Course length: 4.309 km (2.677 miles)
- Distance: 71 laps, 305.909 km (190.083 miles)
- Weather: Clear, Air Temp: 30°C
- Attendance: 120,000

Pole position
Driver	(Colombia) Juan Pablo Montoya	Williams-BMW
- Time: 1:13.114

Fastest lap
Driver	(Colombia) Juan Pablo Montoya	Williams-BMW
- Time: 1:16.079 on lap 60

Podium
First	(Germany) Michael Schumacher	Ferrari
Second	(Germany) Ralf Schumacher	Williams-BMW
Third	(United Kingdom) David Coulthard	McLaren-Mercedes

The 2002 Brazilian Grand Prix (formally the 2002 Grande Prêmio do Brasil) was a Formula One motor race held before 120,000 spectators on 31 March 2002 at the Autódromo José Carlos Pace in São Paulo, Brazil. It was the third round of seventeen in the 2002 Formula One World Championship and the only one to take place in South America. Ferrari's Michael Schumacher won the 71-lap race from second position. Williams's Ralf Schumacher finished in second and McLaren's David Coulthard was third.

Michael Schumacher led the World Drivers' Championship before the race while Williams led the World Constructors' Championship. Williams's Juan Pablo Montoya set the fastest lap time in the one-hour qualifying session to start the race from pole position. Michael Schumacher took the race lead at the start, but Montoya smashed his front wing into Schumacher's left-rear wheel while attempting to retake it, eliminating his chances of victory. He held the lead until he let his lighter-fuelled, one-stopping teammate Rubens Barrichello take the lead on lap 14 before retiring three laps later due to a loss of hydraulic pressure. Michael Schumacher therefore retook the race lead and held it for most of the race, defeating his brother Ralf Schumacher in the final laps to win by 0.588 seconds.

Michael Schumacher's victory was his second of the season and 55th of his career, extending his World Drivers' Championship lead to eight championship points over Ralf Schumacher in second and ten over Montoya in third. With fourteen races remaining in the season, Ferrari decreased Williams' World Constructors' Championship lead to six points.

== Background ==
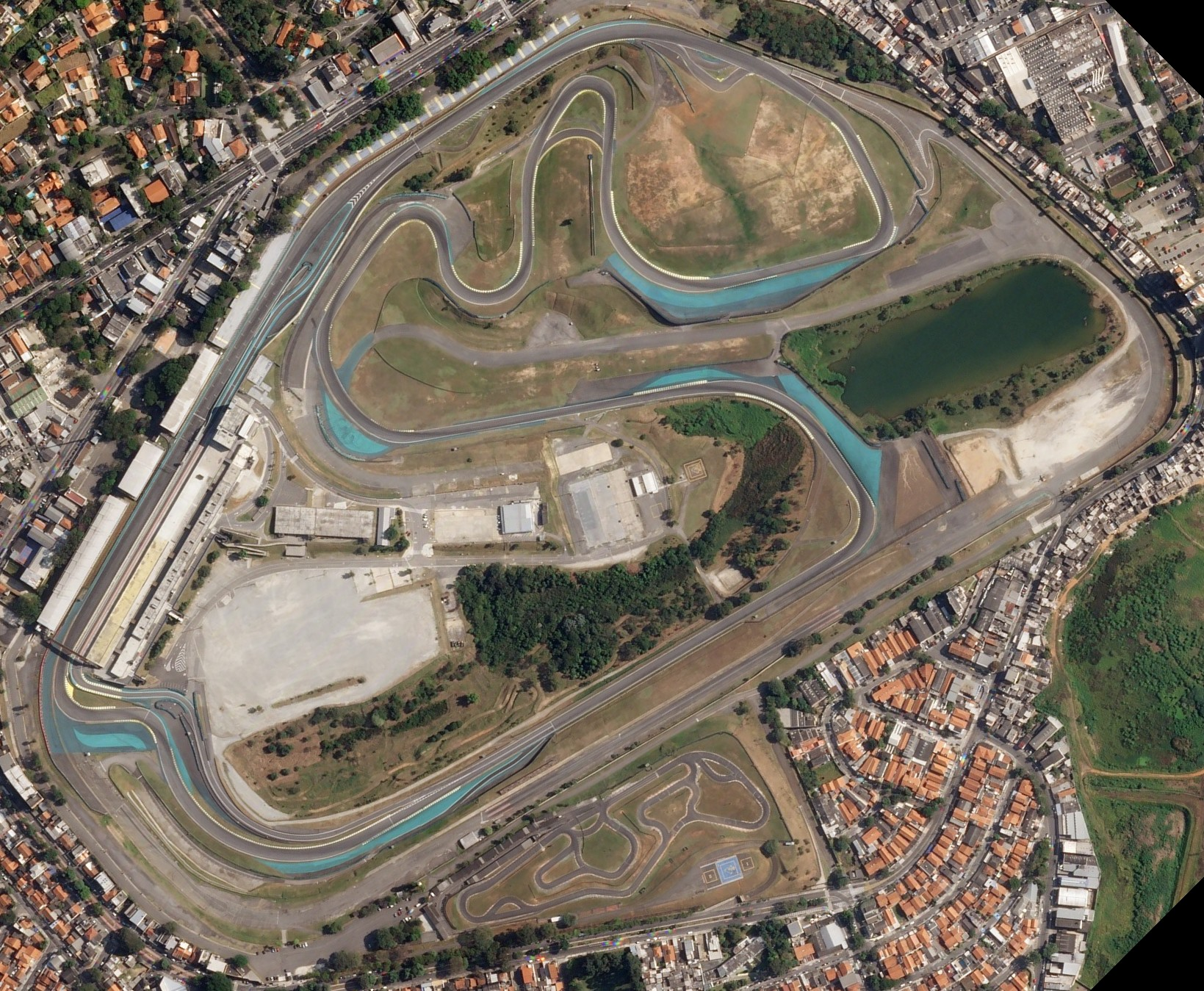
The Autódromo José Carlos Pace, where the Grand Prix was held

The 2002 Brazilian Grand Prix was the third round of seventeen in the 2002 Formula One World Championship. It was held on 31 March 2002 at the 4.309 km (2.677 mi) anti-clockwise Autódromo José Carlos Pace in São Paulo, Brazil. It was the season's only event in South America. The Grand Prix featured eleven teams of two drivers (each representing a different constructor), with no changes to the season entry list. Phoenix Finance did not file an entry application to the event after attempting to do so at the preceding Malaysian Grand Prix. Tyre suppliers Bridgestone and Michelin brought two new dry compounds for the Grand Prix.

Going into the race, Ferrari's Michael Schumacher led the World Drivers' Championship with 14 championship points, ahead of Williams's Juan Pablo Montoya with 12 championship points. Montoya's teammate Ralf Schumacher was third on 10 championship points, ahead of McLaren's Kimi Räikkönen and Jaguar's Eddie Irvine. Williams led the World Constructors' Championship with 22 championship points; eight points ahead of Ferrari in second and ten ahead of McLaren in third.

Following the Malaysian Grand Prix on 17 March, nine of the eleven teams tested aerodynamic and mechanical components, spare cars, racing setups and tyres on their cars for four days at Spain's Circuit de Catalunya from 19 to 22 March as preparation for the Brazilian Grand Prix. Jaguar focused on chassis development to decide whether to race their previous chassis, the R2, or develop the R3 car with their test team, which performed poorly. Ultimately, Jaguar decided to keep the R3 car. McLaren test driver Alexander Wurz (McLaren) lapped fastest on the first and second days. while Michael Schumacher led on the third day. Ferrari's Rubens Barrichello led on the final day. Arrows did not test because their car could not be sent to Europe for testing, while Minardi did not test because their new engine did not fit in their previous car.

Ferrari's main 2002 car, the F2002, was launched that weekend; the team had previously used a modified version of their 2001 car, the F2001, for the first two rounds. Originally scheduled to debut in the first race in Australia, problems with its performance forced the team to develop the car, delaying its debut. Michael Schumacher received one F2002 chassis, while teammate Barrichello used a modified F2001. The Fédération Internationale de l'Automobile (FIA; Formula One's governing body) granted Ferrari's request for four more sets of tyres for Michael Schumacher's spare car because the wheels on the F2002 vehicle did not fit the year-old spare F2001 car. Other teams did not make significant modifications in Brazil, instead focussing on honing their cars ahead of the first European race, the San Marino Grand Prix.

Michael Schumacher stated that with the F2002 car, he was more optimistic about winning the Grand Prix than he had ever been, but that gaining championship points early in the season was critical. Ralf Schumacher stated that he was convinced Williams would beat Ferrari in Brazil after testing in Spain. His teammate, Montoya, had led the Grand Prix the previous year and appeared to be on his way to his first career victory until the rear of his car was hit by Arrows' lapped Jos Verstappen. Montoya hoped he could "make up for the lost opportunity, especially because last season we were stronger at Interlagos than in Malaysia." McLaren's David Coulthard stated that his explicit goal was to win his second consecutive Brazilian Grand Prix, but he was also focused on earning his first championship points of the season after retiring from the first two races.

== Practice ==
Two one-hour practices on Friday and two 45-minute sessions on Saturday preceded the race. The first practice session took place on a dusty, bumpy track in sunny and hot conditions, causing several drivers to lose control of their car. Michael Schumacher set the fastest lap of 1:15.627, one second ahead of Ralf Schumacher. Jordan's Giancarlo Fisichella, the Sauber duo of Nick Heidfeld and Felipe Massa, Arrows's Enrique Bernoldi, Renault's Jenson Button, Jordan's Takuma Sato, Montoya and Arrows' Heinz-Harald Frentzen followed in the top ten. An incident occurred during the session when Räikkönen stalled in the middle of the circuit after spinning out at the blind left-hand Descida do Sol turn halfway through—the incident necessitated a suspension while marshals removed the car. All drivers returned to the pit lane for six minutes. Sato spun and stalled his car at turn four with a minute to go, ending practice prematurely. Montoya sustained a rear tyre puncture and lost a pair of tyres because he was denied a replacement.

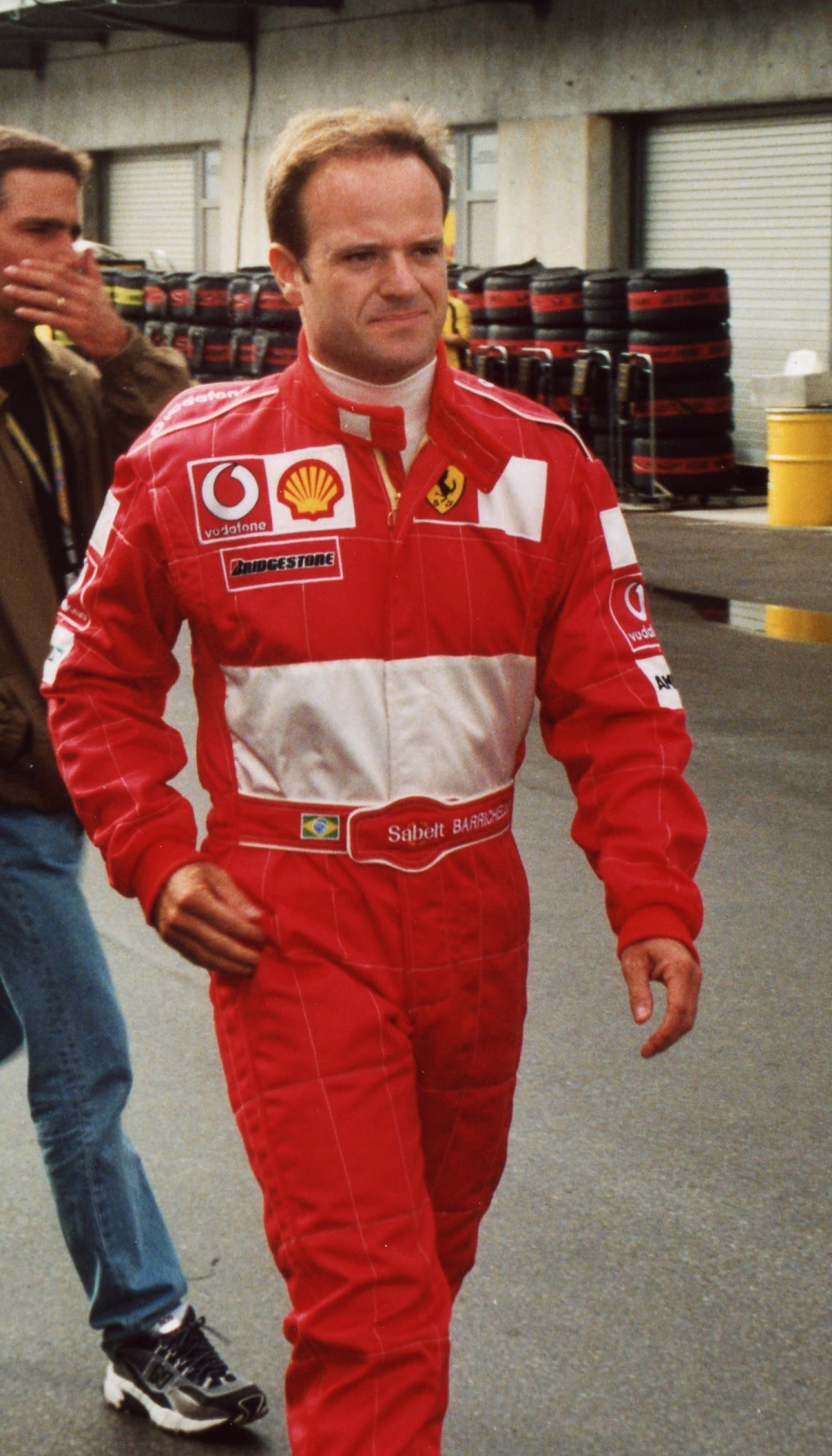
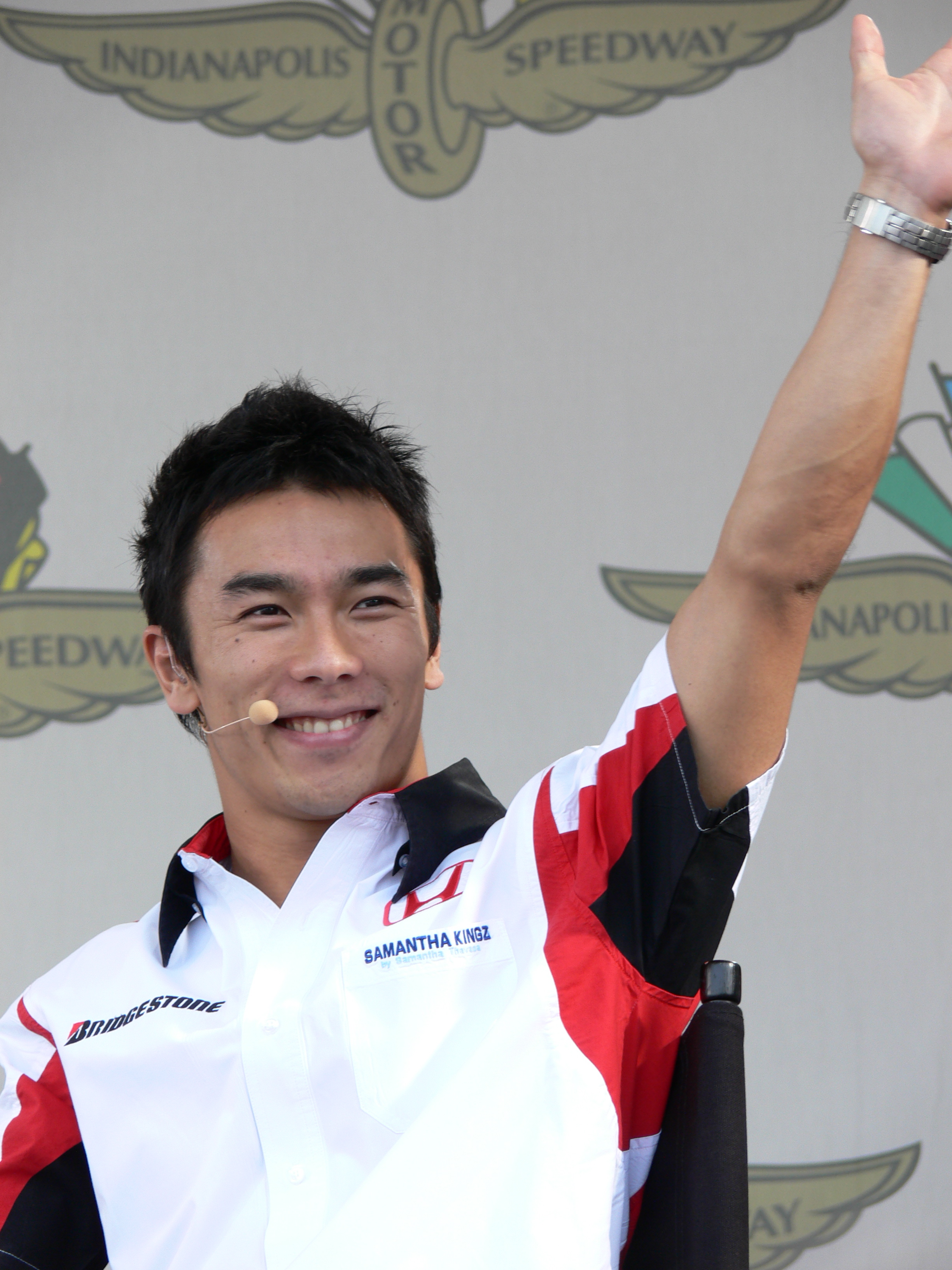
Rubens Barrichello (left) and Takuma Sato (right) each had their fastest qualifying lap times invalidated by the stewards because they had passed the red light at the pit lane exit.

In the second practice session, which took place later in the afternoon in hot weather, Coulthard set fast times in all three sectors, recording the day's fastest lap of 1:15.075. The Williams teammates of Montoya and Ralf Schumacher were second and fourth, respectively, separated by Toyota's Allan McNish running a light fuel load in third. Michael Schumacher (who spun under braking at the left-handed turn one when he struck a bump in the racing surface and stopped with the rear wing resting against the barrier on the run-off area), Räikkönen, Barrichello, Button, British American Racing's (BAR) Jacques Villeneuve and Arrows' Pedro de la Rosa completed the top ten. After the session, the stewards penalised Sato with the loss of his fastest qualifying lap time because he exited the pit lane when the red light was illuminated during the first practice session, an offence per the sporting regulations.

It was sunny and warm for the third practice session that took place on Saturday morning. Michael Schumacher lapped fastest again, this time at 1:13.837 on his final lap towards the end of the session. Räikkönen, Barrichello, Ralf Schumacher, Coulthard, Montoya, Button, Heidfeld, Massa and Villeneuve occupied positions two through ten. Fifteen minutes into the session, Bernoldi locked his front wheels leaving turn four and spun into the inside of turn five before continuing. Sato also spun but avoided stalling his car and continued driving.

The final practice session later in the morning was likewise sunny and warm, with teams fine-tuning their car setups before qualifying. Ralf Schumacher set the fastest time of the session, a 1:13.543, with a minute left. He was 0.020 seconds ahead of Coulthard in second. The Renault duo of Button and Jarno Trulli, Michael Schumacher, Räikkönen, Montoya, Barrichello, Toyota's Mika Salo and Heidfeld were in positions three through ten. Incidents delayed the session, as Massa's car broke down at the side of the track on the start/finish straight—the stranded car forced a red flag suspension as marshals needed to clear the track— Sato spun out after hitting the kerbing and tyre barriers at turn eight, removing the front wing. Following the session, the FIA announced that Barrichello's fastest qualifying time would be stripped since he exited the pit lane when the red light was on.

== Qualifying ==
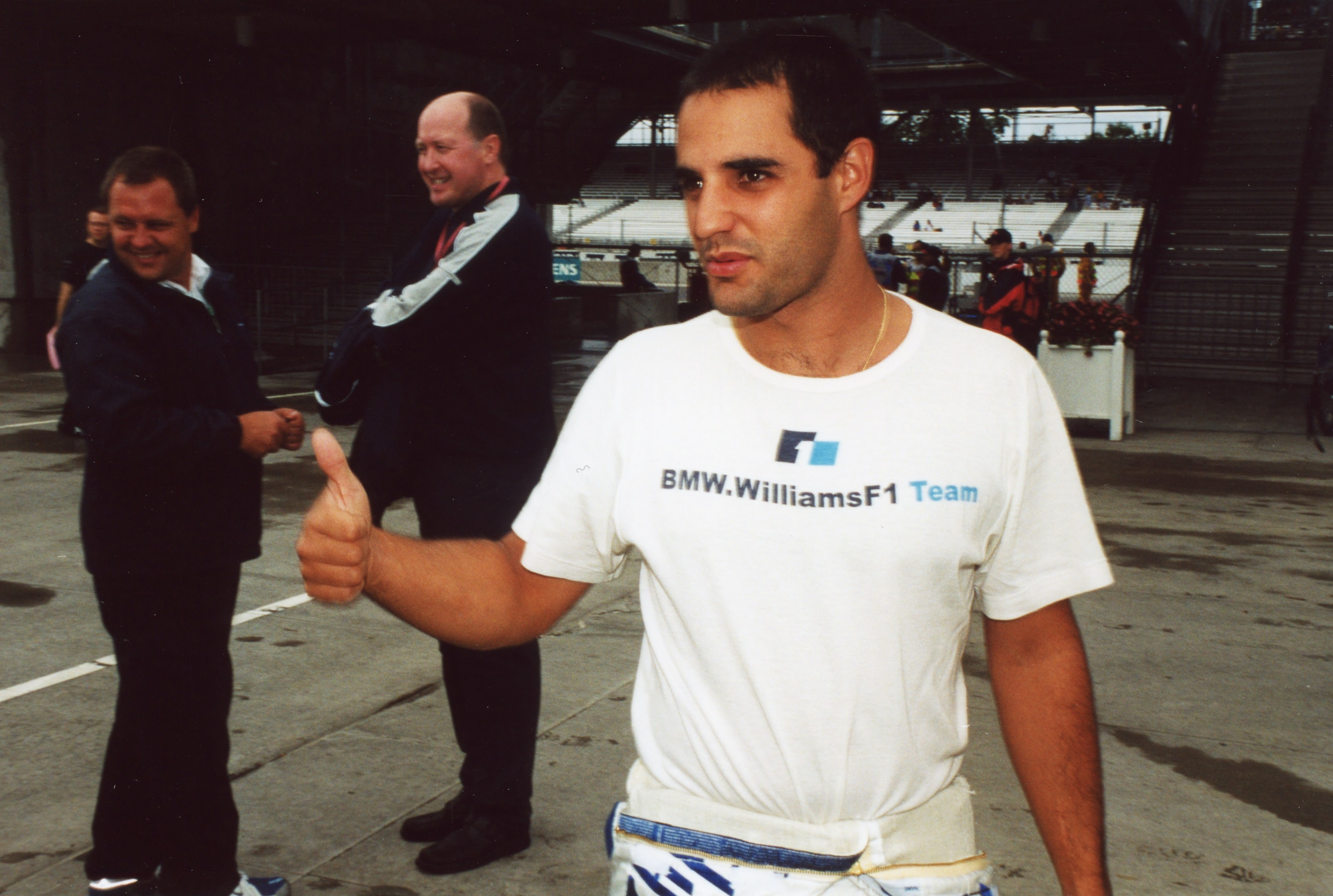
Juan Pablo Montoya, who took the fourth pole position of his career in his Williams car with the fastest lap time in the one-hour qualifying session.

Each driver was allowed twelve laps during Saturday's one-hour qualifying session, with starting positions determined by the drivers' quickest laps. During this session, the 107% rule was in effect, requiring each driver to remain within 107% of the quickest lap time in order to qualify for the race. Qualifying was held in sunny and very hot weather conditions, and no driver ventured onto the circuit until after 20 minutes had passed. Montoya took the lead halfway through qualifying, and secured his first pole position of the season and fourth of his career with a 1:13.114 lap on his third run. He was pleased with the race setup tweaks made to his car following the last practice session, which enhanced balance, especially after braking heavily for the first left-hand corner after the pit lane. Michael Schumacher completed nine of his twelve laps and qualified second, 0.127 seconds behind, after losing control of his Ferrari on his third and last run late in qualifying. The mechanics' rear wing tweak did not make his Ferrari faster, but he was the only Bridgestone-shod runner in the top seven places. Ralf Schumacher was the early pace setter and took third, having used qualifying to locate a decent racing setup. Coulthard qualified fourth, one spot higher than the previous year, and he was pleased with the McLaren MP4-17's balance when carrying a full fuel load. His teammate Räikkönen qualified fifth after switching to the spare McLaren for one lap because his racing car experienced a minor hydraulic failure on his first lap on the track and needed to be rectified before he could drive it again. Trulli and Button from Renault qualified sixth and eighth, respectively. Trulli encountered slower cars on all of his runs, whereas Button noted that his car was slightly overweight following a weight distribution tweak for his latter runs.

Barrichello, eighth, had a gear selection issue. The penalty issued on Barrichello did not affect his starting position because his time was fast enough to put him ahead of ninth-placed Heidfeld. A water leak in Heidfeld's race car's engine while it was being warmed up forced him to drive the spare Sauber car, which had a recurring brake issue. Salo secured tenth for the second consecutive event. De la Rosa qualified 11th, ahead of teamamte Irvine for the second consecutive race. He was two-tenths of a second faster on his final run before being bulked by a Minardi driver. Massa in 12th tried old tyres in the front and new tyres in the back, but failed to lap faster. Irvine qualified 13th, driving a more balanced Jaguar R3. Fisichella was not competitive and was 14th. Villeneuve was the faster of the two BAR drivers in 15th. McNish struck a kerb on his final run, losing time and finishing 16th. Olivier Panis' second BAR car struggled to improve his race setup from the morning practice session, taking 17th due to a lack of power. Frentzen (18th) had understeer and oversteer on all four runs. Sato, 19th, said his penalty gave him one less opportunity to record a fast lap. Minardi's Mark Webber qualified 20th after modifying the racing setup and felt he could have improved at turn four. Bernoldi in 21st reported excess oversteer. Webber's teammate Alex Yoong was the final driver to qualify for the race in 22nd; he could not find the needed balance and handling to lap quicker.

=== Qualifying classification ===
Pos	No	Driver	Constructor	Lap	Gap	Grid
1	6	(Colombia) Juan Pablo Montoya	Williams-BMW	1:13.114	—	1
2	1	(Germany) Michael Schumacher	Ferrari	1:13.241	+0.127	2
3	5	(Germany) Ralf Schumacher	Williams-BMW	1:13.328	+0.214	3
4	3	(United Kingdom) David Coulthard	McLaren-Mercedes	1:13.565	+0.451	4
5	4	(Finland) Kimi Räikkönen	McLaren-Mercedes	1:13.595	+0.481	5
6	14	(Italy) Jarno Trulli	Renault	1:13.611	+0.497	6
7	15	(United Kingdom) Jenson Button	Renault	1:13.665	+0.551	7
8	2	(Brazil) Rubens Barrichello^{1}	Ferrari	1:13.935	+0.821	8
9	7	(Germany) Nick Heidfeld	Sauber-Petronas	1:14.233	+1.119	9
10	24	(Finland) Mika Salo	Toyota	1:14.443	+1.329	10
11	17	(Spain) Pedro de la Rosa	Jaguar-Cosworth	1:14.464	+1.350	11
12	8	(Brazil) Felipe Massa	Sauber-Petronas	1:14.533	+1.419	12
13	16	(United Kingdom) Eddie Irvine	Jaguar-Cosworth	1:14.537	+1.423	13
14	9	(Italy) Giancarlo Fisichella	Jordan-Honda	1:14.748	+1.634	14
15	11	(Canada) Jacques Villeneuve	BAR-Honda	1:14.760	+1.646	15
16	25	(United Kingdom) Allan McNish	Toyota	1:14.990	+1.876	16
17	12	(France) Olivier Panis	BAR-Honda	1:14.996	+1.882	17
18	20	(Germany) Heinz-Harald Frentzen	Arrows-Cosworth	1:15.112	+1.998	18
19	10	(Japan) Takuma Sato^{1}	Jordan-Honda	1:15.296	+2.182	19
20	23	(Australia) Mark Webber	Minardi-Asiatech	1:15.340	+2.226	20
21	21	(Brazil) Enrique Bernoldi	Arrows-Cosworth	1:15.355	+2.241	21
22	22	(Malaysia) Alex Yoong	Minardi-Asiatech	1:16.728	+3.614	22
107% time: 1:18.232

Notes

- ^1– The fastest qualifying lap times of Rubens Barrichello (1:13.919) and Takuma Sato (1:15.283) were cancelled because both drivers exited the pit lane when the red light was on during free practice. Their starting positions were unaffected by the penalties.

== Warm-up ==
On race morning, drivers completed installation laps in their race and spare cars to test their systems during a half-hour warm-up session in sunny weather. Michael Schumacher lapped fastest at 1:15.866, ahead of De la Rosa, Räikkönen, the Williams duo of Ralf Schumacher and Montoya, Barrichello, Coulthard, Frentzen, McNish and Bernoldi in positions two through ten. Webber and teammate Yoong collided at the Senna S chicane, with Yoong spinning off at turn seven. McNish swerved to avoid the slowing Bernoldi at the pit lane entry before Bernoldi sped up and weaved towards McNish.

With two minutes remaining, Bernoldi struck the tyre barrier at the bottom of the hill at the Senna S chicane, with such force that the oil tank ruptured, causing the rear of his car to catch fire and necessitating a red flag as the FIA medical car was deployed to the scene. Drivers swerved to avoid the detached wheels from Bernoldi's stationary car on the track, but they were not warned by yellow flags. As medical car driver and former Formula One racer Alex Ribeiro came to Bernoldi's aid, Heidfeld was unable to slow down and lost control of his vehicle. Heidfeld ran onto the grass on the inside, colliding with the guardrail and the medical car's left-front door just as Ribeiro opened it. No one was hurt but Heidfeld's car sustained heavy suspension damage. Warm-up was stopped for ten minutes, and the medical car was replaced. Heidfeld was not penalised for hitting the medical car.

== Race ==
The 71-lap race commenced at 14:00 local time before 120,000 spectators. Conditions for the race were dry and hot with the air temperature 31 °C (88 °F) and the track temperature ranged between 38 and 40 °C (100 and 104 °F). Because of the warm asphalt temperatures, the Michelin-shod teams were favoured to dominate.

When the race started, Montoya pressed Michael Schumacher on the inside towards the pit lane barrier on the way to the Senna S chicane because Schumacher had a faster start due to his new launch control system. Montoya braked later than Michael Schumacher to stay ahead, but he ran wide at the chicane exit, allowing Schumacher to get alongside him through turn three. Michael Schumacher took the best line around the Curva do Sol corner and into the back straight, passing Montoya. Montoya slipstreamed Michael Schumacher on the long back straight into turn four, anticipating an overtake, then turned left to pass on the inside while duelling Schumacher. Michael Schumacher maintained the lead until Montoya swung right, leading him to strike the Ferrari's left-rear tyre and push his front wing askew against the carcass of the Bridgestone tyre before failing beneath Montoya's front-left wheel. Carbon fibre debris flicked back towards other cars, which both Fisichella and McNish ran over.

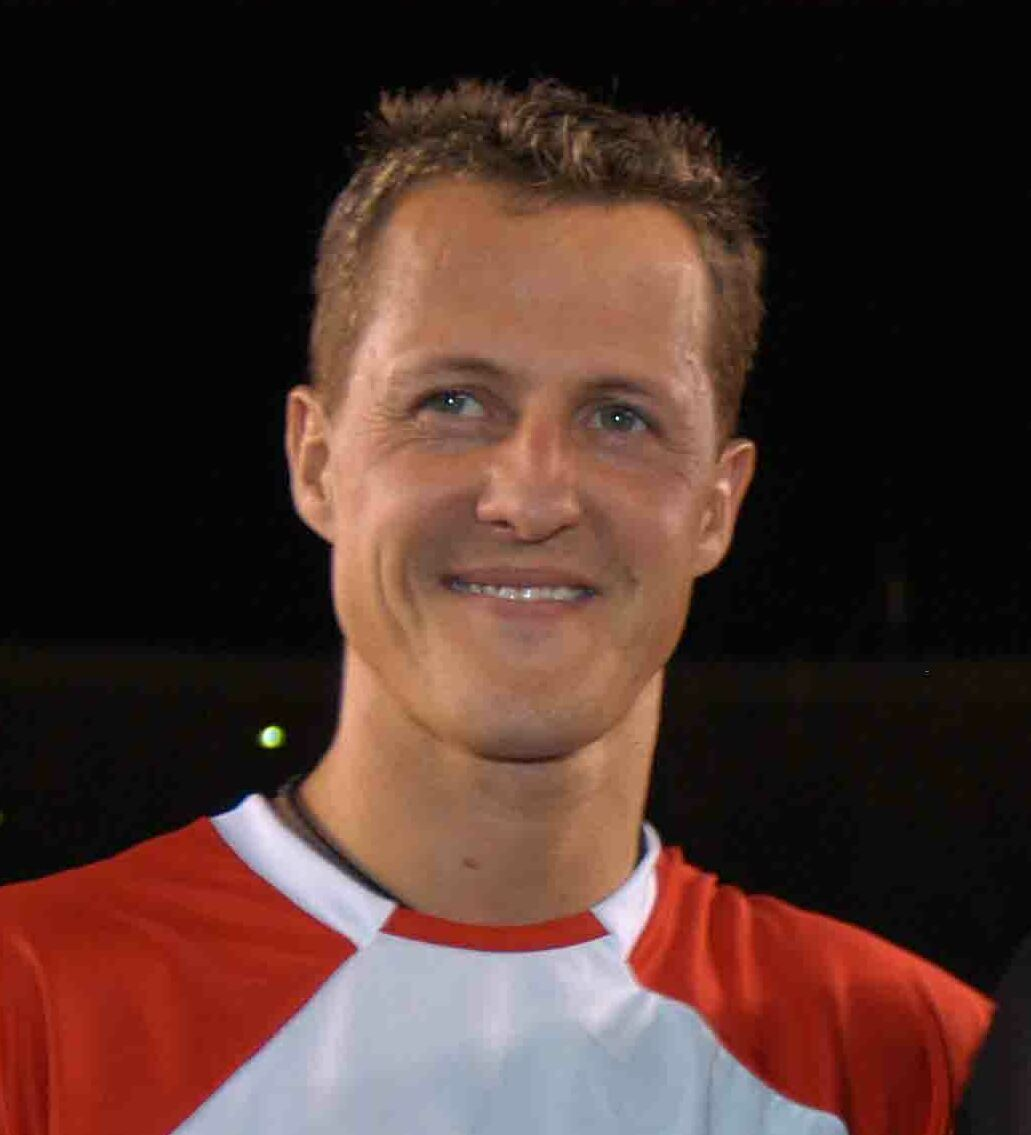
Michael Schumacher (pictured in 2005) took his second victory of the season despite the rear of his Ferrari being hit by Montoya on the first lap.

Ferrari feared Michael Schumacher had a puncture from the incident, but this was not the case. Montoya remained on the track, but the incident moved his teammate Ralf Schumacher to second, and the fast-starting Renaults of Trulli and Button to third and fourth, respectively. For the second straight race, Montoya had an unscheduled pit stop for a replacement front wing and debris removal, ending his chance at victory. When the first lap ended, Michael Schumacher led Ralf Schumacher by 1.5 seconds. Barrichello overtook Coulthard through turn one for fifth on lap two; Barrichello was on a one-stop strategy whereas his teammate Michael Schumacher was on a two-stop strategy. Michael Schumacher began to pull away from the rest of the field. On lap three, Barrichello passed Button for fourth while Salo overtook De la Rosa for 11th. Barrichello overtook Button for third on the following lap. He lapped faster than teammate Michael Schumacher, and on lap six, passed Ralf Schumacher on the inside at the end of the start/finish straight into turn one. Meanwhile, Irvine lost positions to Salo and De la Rosa, dropping to 11th.

Fisichella's engine failed on lap eight, despite the fact that his underpowered Honda engine had been detuned to enhance reliability, and he became the race's first retirement at turn ten. That lap, Frentzen overtook Irvine for 13th after Irvine had lost 12th to Villeneuve. Sato passed Panis for 16th but lost control of his car and Panis retook the position on lap nine. Barrichello closed up to race leader Michael Schumacher, as Villeneuve overtook De la Rosa for 11th on lap 12. Coulthard was racing Button for fifth and slipstreamed by him into turn one the next lap. Michael Schumacher slowed between turns two and three on lap 14, allowing teammate Barrichello to close up and pass him for the race lead at the end of the back straight. Barrichello proceeded to pull away until he slowed due to a loss of hydraulic pressure, forcing him to go off into the grass at the Bico da Pato turn, retiring from his eighth consecutive Brazilian Grand Prix on lap 17.

With Michael Schumacher retaking the race lead, it became a duel between him and Ralf Schumacher, who was lapping quicker than his brother. On lap 18, Michael Schumacher locked his front-left tyre in turn one but maintained control of his car. Salo overtook Massa for eighth a lap later. Bernoldi was retired in the pit lane for safety reasons on lap 20 due to a broken rear track rod. Sato attempted to overtake De la Rosa into the first corner the following lap, but he ran wide due to overbraking. Villeneuve passed Massa for ninth on the 22nd lap. Three laps later, Coulthard entered turn one on the inside of third-placed Trulli but was unable to overtake him. On lap 26, he tried again into the first turn but was unsuccessful because Trulli defended his position. Panis retired at the pit lane exit due to a gearbox problem, while Frentzen retired with a broken rear track rod on the following lap.

Montoya returned to the top ten on lap 30 by overtaking De la Rosa for tenth, and the following lap he passed Irvine on the start/finish straight for ninth. However, he was lapping slower than teammate Ralf Schumacher, who was gradually gaining on Michael Schumacher as his Michelin tyres began to outperform the Ferrari's Bridgestones. This was until Michael Schumacher gradually pulled away from Ralf Schumacher midway through the race with a string of consecutive fastest laps. On lap 39, Räikkönen passed Button for fifth on the inside at the end of the start/finish straight. Michael Schumacher led by eight seconds when he made his solitary pit stop for fuel and to clear debris from a radiator duct on that lap. Ralf Schumacher took the race lead after his brother's 12.6-second stop. Montoya overtook Heidfeld for seventh on lap 42.

McNish's handling deteriorated due to oversteer, and he lost control of his Toyota when a rear wheel locked while braking for turn four on the following lap. He retired from the race. During lap 44, Webber bumped Massa in the rear, sending him spinning into the tarmac run-off area. Massa retired after the incident, while Webber entered the pit lane. Ralf Schumacher made his only pit stop on that lap. He was stationary for 9.4 seconds because he conserved fuel and Michael Schumacher regained the race lead by almost four seconds. Over the next two laps, Coulthard and Räikkönen made pit stops, and the McLaren teammates returned to the circuit in third and fourth place, ahead of Trulli. After the front runners had their pit stops, Michael Schumacher led from Ralf Schumacher, Coulthard, Räikkönen, Trulli and Button.

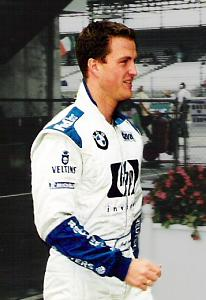
Ralf Schumacher (pictured in 2002) finished second, 0.588 seconds behind Michael Schumacher after closing up to his brother late in the Grand Prix.

Ralf Schumacher began to close the gap on Michael Schumacher after adjusting his front wing during his pit stop and using scraped front tyres. He closed the distance to 1.5 seconds by the 53rd lap and then to six-tenths of a second four laps later. On lap 58, Michael Schumacher locked his wheel exiting turn one but remained the race leader despite Ralf Schumacher's continuous pressure. Nevertheless, Michael Schumacher lapped half-a-second faster than Ralf Schumacher on that lap. Trulli retired on lap 61 after suffering an abrupt engine failure on the pit lane straight, with smoke spewing from the engine. This promoted his teammate Button to fifth and Montoya returned to the points-paying positions in sixth. Three laps later, Heidfeld retired in the Sauber garage with a loose brake disc. On lap 69, Räikkönen lost control of his McLaren's rear when braking for turn four due to a rear wheel hub failure and bounced across the gravel trap, breaking the right-rear suspension. This moved Button to fourth, Montoya to fifth and Salo to sixth. On the final lap, Villeneuve stopped in the second sector when his engine cut out.

At the front, Michael Schumacher fought off Ralf Schumacher in the final laps to claim his second victory out of three races in the season and 55th of his career. (Note: At the conclusion of the race, retired footballer Pelé was tasked with waving the chequered flag but failed to notice the Schumachers approaching the finish line. He waved immediately upon realising his mistake, but did so to Takuma Sato's Jordan car, who was two laps behind the leader.) Ralf Schumacher was unable to affect a pass finished 0.588 seconds adrift in second. Coulthard took third, scoring his first championship points of the season. Button drove an understeering Renault, which was changed with a minor front wing adjustment at his pit stop, but scored his second consecutive fourth-place finish, holding off the closing Montoya in fifth position. Salo completed the points-paying positions in sixth, repeating his result from the season-opening Australian Grand Prix. Irvine finished seventh despite an engine problem that necessitated his team instructing him to activate the oil pump. His Jaguar teammate De la Rosa was eighth. Sato was ninth despite suffering from sore neck muscles. Villeneuve was classified tenth despite not finishing the race. Webber finished 11th due to fuel-metering unit troubles, which caused the Minardi computers to report that the fuel tanks were empty when they were not, necessitating a late-race pit stop. Räikkönen failed to finish but was classified in 12th. Yoong was the final classified finisher in 13th.

=== Post-race ===
The top three drivers appeared on the podium to collect their trophies and spoke to the media in the subsequent press conference. Michael Schumacher said he was not expecting Ferrari to deliver a good performance and had been expecting to "keep the lap time but we sort of stayed more consistent where the Williams would tend to go faster and faster towards the end of the stint, which luckily didn't happen." Ralf Schumacher claimed he enjoyed the battle with his brother at Interlagos less than at the 2001 Canadian Grand Prix, which he won, because he finished second this time, adding, "It wasn't an exciting race. I'll do it next time." Coulthard said it was "a great feeling to be back on the podium" and commented stated that he had to be patient during the pit stop phase to pass the Renaults that were slowing him until he undercut them at his sole pit stop and began lapping faster.

The collision between Montoya and Michael Schumacher was similar to that of the Malaysian Grand Prix two weeks earlier. Montoya commented, "I thought he was a fair guy to race with but he is not" and admitted disappointment, adding he was angry Michael Schumacher was not penalised for the manoevure. The FIA did not sanction Montoya for the comments. Michael Schumacher thought Montoya had behaved well, leaving him room, and maintained he had no idea what had happened in the incident. Ferrari technical director Ross Brawn felt Michael Schumacher had done no error, but recommended every driver to be slightly calmer on the opening lap of races, given the number of first-lap incidents, "The race is more than the first few corners and drivers need to understand that." Ferrari's sporting director, Jean Todt, likewise believed Michael Schumacher was not to blame for the accident and was not playing games.

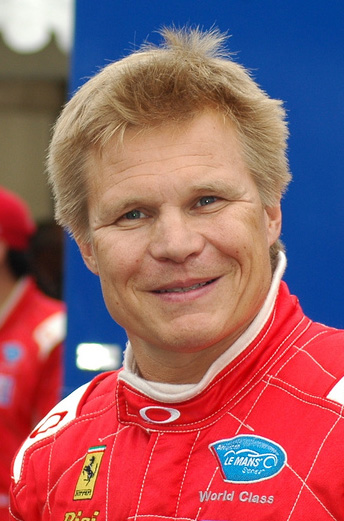
Mika Salo (pictured in 2009) finished in sixth place, repeating his result from the season-opening Australian Grand Prix.

Button said he Renault helped him over the radio in helping him beat Montoya to finish in fourth, adding, "I don't think he could get close enough to me, though, and I have had so many moments like that in F1 that you just relax and push as hard as you can. It's good to be able to hold off a Williams like that." Salo said finishing in sixth was "quite amazing for the new car" but admitted the heat caused him to become tired towards the end of the race. Barrichello said he was disappointed to retire in Brazil for the eighth consecutive year but that the problem was out of his control, adding, "I am driving as fast as I can, and in some ways we could say that I have retired when leading in each of the three races. It's been a bad beginning to the year. I had so many problems yesterday, but I am still confident." Todt thought the Michelin-shod teams would be the favourites for victory, "But having said that, I knew we had an opportunity and that has been shown."

Michael Schumacher's victory extended his World Drivers' Championship lead to 24 points, eight more than Ralf Schumacher in second place. Montoya was demoted to third place with 14 championship points, while Button rose to fourth with six. Ferrari reduced Williams' World Constructors' Championship lead to six championship points. McLaren stayed third with eight championship points, but Renault surpassed Jaguar to claim fourth place with fourteen races remaining in the season.

=== Race classification ===
Drivers who scored championship points are denoted in bold.

Pos	No	Driver	Constructor	Tyre	Laps	Time/Retired	Grid	Points
1	1	(Germany) **Michael Schumacher**	**Ferrari**	B	71	1:31:43.663	2	10
2	5	(Germany) **Ralf Schumacher**	**Williams-BMW**	M	71	+0.588	3	6
3	3	(United Kingdom) **David Coulthard**	**McLaren-Mercedes**	M	71	+59.109	4	4
4	15	(United Kingdom) **Jenson Button**	**Renault**	M	71	+1:06.883	7	3
5	6	(Colombia) **Juan Pablo Montoya**	**Williams-BMW**	M	71	+1:07.563	1	2
6	24	(Finland) **Mika Salo**	**Toyota**	M	70	+1 Lap	10	1
7	16	(United Kingdom) Eddie Irvine	Jaguar-Cosworth	M	70	+1 Lap	13	
8	17	(Spain) Pedro de la Rosa	Jaguar-Cosworth	M	70	+1 Lap	11	
9	10	(Japan) Takuma Sato	Jordan-Honda	B	69	+2 Laps	19	
10	11	(Canada) Jacques Villeneuve	BAR-Honda	B	68	Engine	15	
11	23	(Australia) Mark Webber	Minardi-Asiatech	M	68	+3 Laps	20	
12	4	(Finland) Kimi Räikkönen	McLaren-Mercedes	M	67	Wheel rim	5	
13	22	(Malaysia) Alex Yoong	Minardi-Asiatech	M	67	+4 Laps	22	
Ret	7	(Germany) Nick Heidfeld	Sauber-Petronas	B	61	Brakes	9	
Ret	14	(Italy) Jarno Trulli	Renault	M	60	Engine	6	
Ret	8	(Brazil) Felipe Massa	Sauber-Petronas	B	41	Collision	12	
Ret	25	(United Kingdom) Allan McNish	Toyota	M	40	Spin	16	
Ret	12	(France) Olivier Panis	BAR-Honda	B	25	Gearbox	17	
Ret	20	(Germany) Heinz-Harald Frentzen	Arrows-Cosworth	B	25	Suspension	18	
Ret	21	(Brazil) Enrique Bernoldi	Arrows-Cosworth	B	19	Suspension	21	
Ret	2	(Brazil) Rubens Barrichello	Ferrari	B	16	Hydraulics	8	
Ret	9	(Italy) Giancarlo Fisichella	Jordan-Honda	B	6	Engine	14	

== Championship standings after the race ==
Drivers' Championship standings

+/–	Pos	Driver	Points
	1	(Germany) Michael Schumacher	24
1	2	(Germany) Ralf Schumacher	16
1	3	(Colombia) Juan Pablo Montoya	14
2	4	(United Kingdom) Jenson Button	6
1	5	(Finland) Kimi Räikkönen	4

Constructors' Championship standings

+/–	Pos	Constructor	Points
	1	(United Kingdom) Williams-BMW	30
	2	(Italy) Ferrari	24
	3	(United Kingdom) McLaren-Mercedes	8
1	4	(France) Renault	6
1	5	(United Kingdom) Jaguar-Cosworth	3
Sources:

- Note: Only the top five positions are included for both sets of standings.

== Notes ==
Previous race: 2002 Malaysian Grand Prix	FIA Formula One World Championship; 2002 season	Next race: 2002 San Marino Grand Prix
Previous race: 2001 Brazilian Grand Prix	Brazilian Grand Prix	Next race: 2003 Brazilian Grand Prix
