= Jaguar R1 =

Formula One racing car

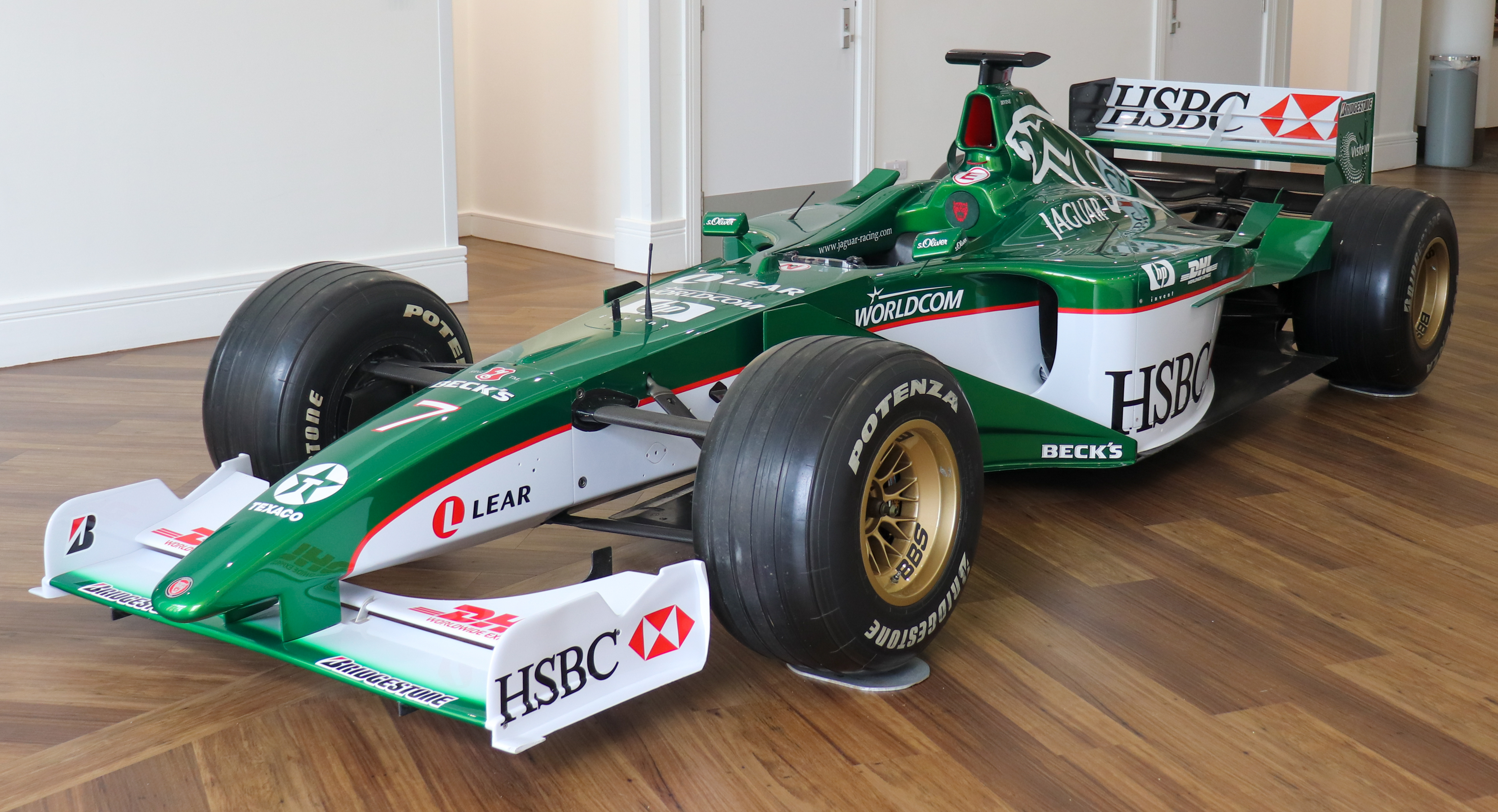
- The Jaguar R1 on display at the British Motor Museum
- Category: Formula One
- Constructor: Jaguar
- Designers: Gary Anderson (Technical Director); John Russell (Chief Designer); Darren Davies (Head of Aerodynamics); Nick Hayes (Engine Chief Designer - Cosworth)
- Predecessor: Stewart SF3
- Successor: R2

Technical specifications
- Chassis: Carbon-fibre monocoque
- Suspension (front): double wishbones, pushrod
- Suspension (rear): double wishbones, pushrod
- Engine: Cosworth CR-2 3.0-litre V10, naturally-aspirated, mid-engined
- Transmission: Jaguar 6-speed magnesium-cased longitudinal sequential manual
- Power: 805 hp @ 17,500 rpm
- Fuel: Texaco
- Lubricants: Havoline
- Tyres: Bridgestone

Competition history
- Notable entrants: Jaguar Racing
- Notable drivers: 7. (United Kingdom) Eddie Irvine; 7. (Brazil) Luciano Burti; 8. (United Kingdom) Johnny Herbert
- Debut: 2000 Australian Grand Prix
- Last event: 2000 Malaysian Grand Prix
Races	Wins	Poles	F/Laps
17	0	0	0
- Constructors' Championships: 0
- Drivers' Championships: 0

The Jaguar R1 (originally known as the Stewart SF4) was the car with which the Jaguar Racing team competed in the 2000 Formula One World Championship, and the first Jaguar-badged Formula One car following Ford's purchase of the Stewart team the previous year.

The car was driven by Eddie Irvine, who joined the team from Ferrari, and Johnny Herbert, who had driven for Stewart in 1999.

== Overview ==
The car proved largely disappointing, despite flashes of promise, especially in the hands of Eddie Irvine, who was regularly able to qualify the car in the top ten. The car's race pace was often poor and it suffered from an unreliable gearbox. Irvine, the 1999 championship runner-up, could only score 4 points, placing the team ninth overall in the Constructors' Championship.

The R1 was the last F1 car that Johnny Herbert raced; the experienced Englishman retiring at the end of the season after a difficult campaign, his final race in Malaysia ended in a frightening accident caused by suspension failure from which he was lucky to escape with minor injuries. It was also the car in which Luciano Burti made his race début when he substituted for Irvine in Austria.

Tiff Needell became the fourth person to drive the car when he drove it before the Spanish Grand Prix as part of a segment for the TV show Top Gear.

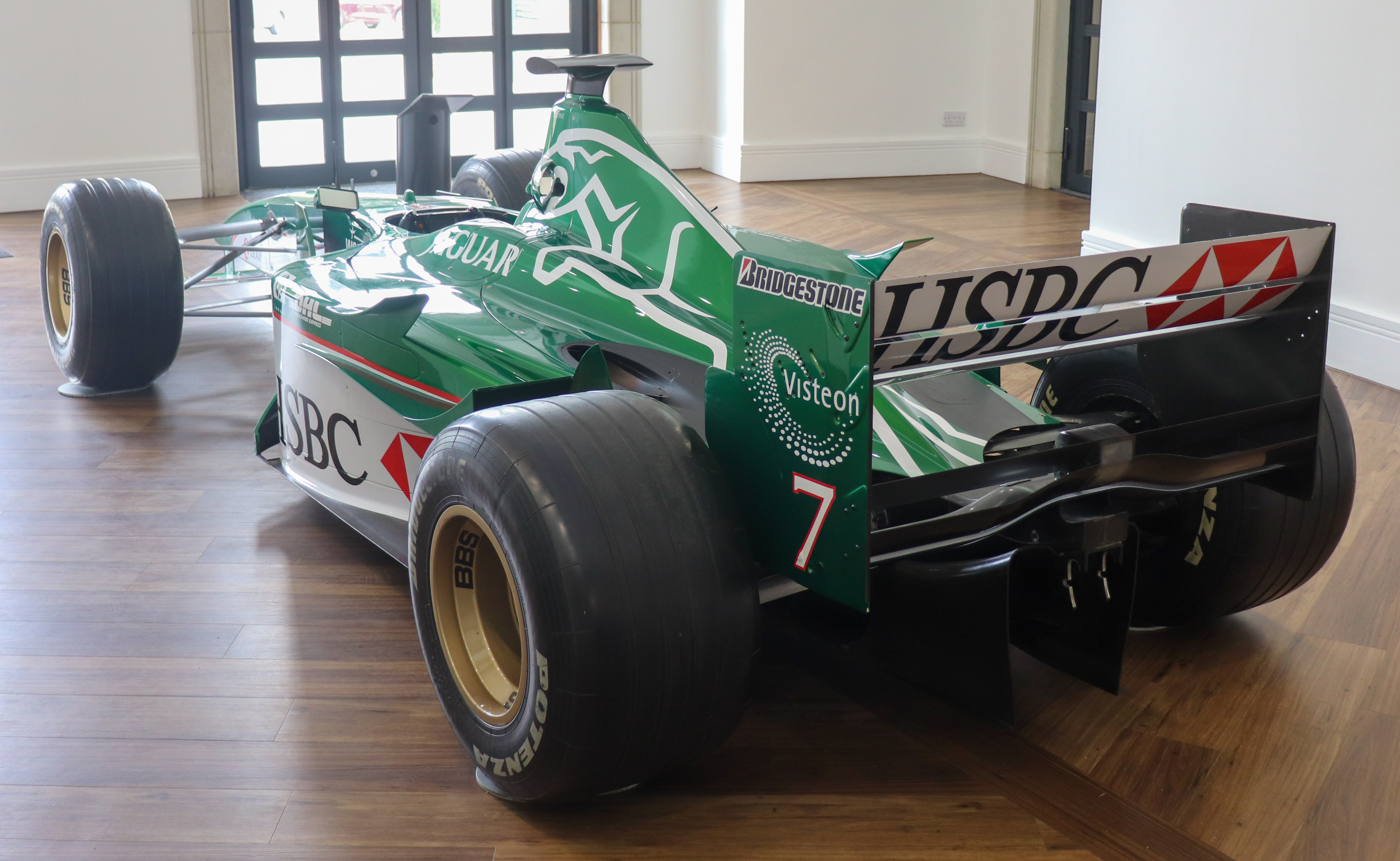
Jaguar R1 rear

== Sponsorship and livery ==
The car was painted in British Racing Green, a tradition of the British racing cars with a white graphics and its iconic white leaping-cat emblem on the engine cover. Several sponsors were retained from its previous team, including HSBC, Lear Corporation and Visteon. In France, the Beck's logos were replaced by "Best's", due to alcohol advertising being prohibited.

== Complete Formula One results ==
(key)

Year	Entrant	Engine	Tyres	Drivers	1	2	3	4	5	6	7	8	9	10	11	12	13	14	15	16	17	Points	WCC
2000	Jaguar Racing	Cosworth V10	B		AUS	BRA	SMR	GBR	ESP	EUR	MON	CAN	FRA	AUT	GER	HUN	BEL	ITA	USA	JPN	MAL	4	9th
2000	Jaguar Racing	Cosworth V10	B	(United Kingdom) Eddie Irvine	Ret	Ret	7	13	11	Ret	4	13	13	PO	10	8	10	Ret	7	8	6	4	9th
2000	Jaguar Racing	Cosworth V10	B	(Brazil) Luciano Burti										11								4	9th
2000	Jaguar Racing	Cosworth V10	B	(United Kingdom) Johnny Herbert	Ret	Ret	10	12	13	11	9	Ret	Ret	7	Ret	Ret	8	Ret	11	7	Ret	4	9th
