= Jaguar R3 =

Formula One racing car

Jaguar R3 Jaguar R3B
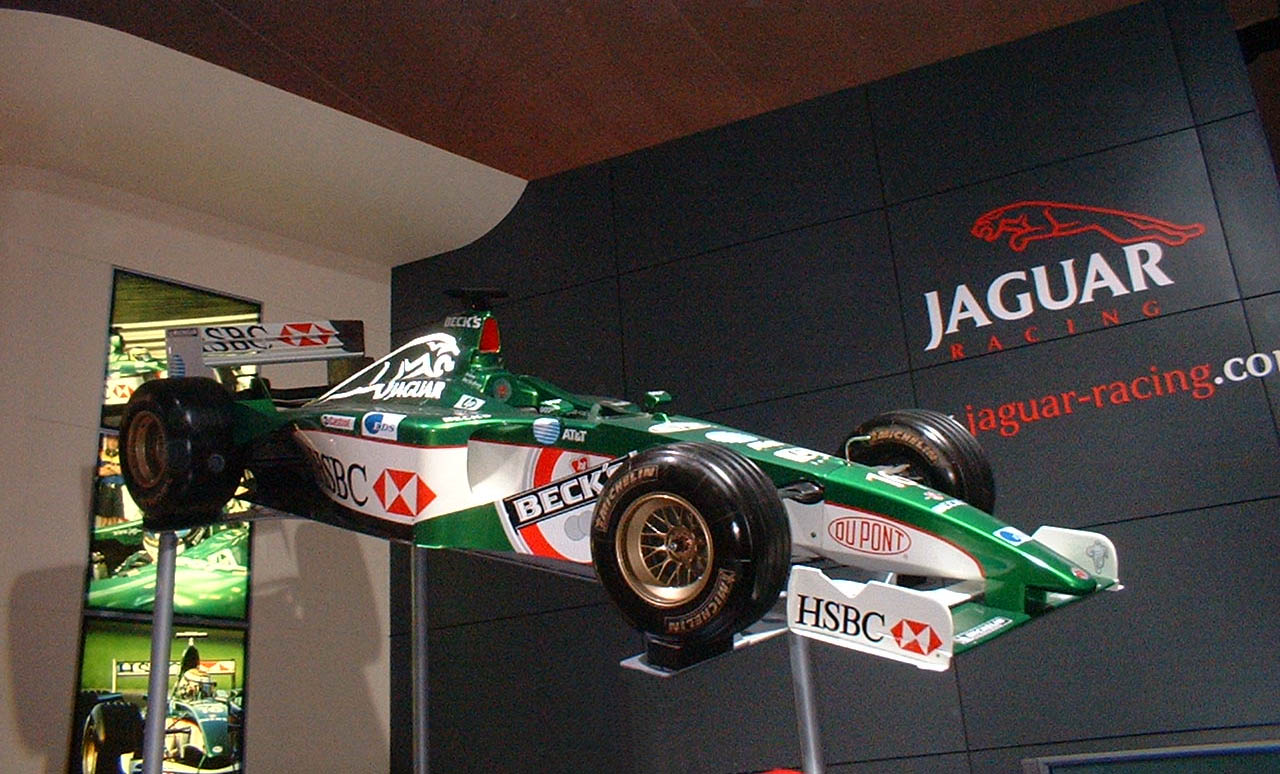
- Category: Formula One
- Constructor: Jaguar
- Designers: Steve Nichols (Technical Director); John Russell (Chief Designer); Frederic Vellutini (Head of Electronics); Mark Handford (Head of Aerodynamics); Nick Hayes (Engine Chief Designer - Cosworth)
- Predecessor: R2
- Successor: R4

Technical specifications
- Chassis: Carbon-fibre monocoque
- Engine: Cosworth CR-3 / Cosworth CR-4 3.0-litre V10 (72°) naturally aspirated mid-engine
- Transmission: Jaguar 7-speed longitudinal semi-automatic sequential
- Power: 805 hp @ 17,500 rpm
- Fuel: BP
- Lubricants: Castrol
- Tyres: Michelin

Competition history
- Notable entrants: Jaguar Racing
- Notable drivers: 16. (United Kingdom) Eddie Irvine; 17. (Spain) Pedro de la Rosa
- Debut: 2002 Australian Grand Prix
- Last event: 2002 Japanese Grand Prix
Races	Wins	Podiums	Poles	F/Laps
17	0	1	0	0
- Constructors' Championships: 0
- Drivers' Championships: 0

The Jaguar R3 is a Formula One racing car with which Jaguar Racing competed in the 2002 Formula One season. The car was launched on 4 January 2002. It was driven by Eddie Irvine and Pedro de la Rosa, both retained from 2001. A "B Specification" car named the Jaguar R3B made its debut at the 2002 British Grand Prix and used for the remainder of the 2002 season.

This was the first Jaguar Formula One car to run on BP fuel and Castrol lubricant following Chevron's decision to pull out from the sport.

== Overview ==
After the disappointing past two seasons, 2002 was even worse for Jaguar. The team admitted to making a lot of mistakes especially in the wind tunnel, as its calculations were wrong. After a fortuitous fourth place at the attritional Australian Grand Prix, the car's poor reliability and lack of horsepower began to show and the team slipped down the rankings; however, towards the end of the season updates were brought in and the car began to improve, culminating in Irvine scoring the team's final podium finish at Monza.

The team finished 7th in the Constructors' Championship, with eight points, all scored by Irvine.

== Sponsorship and livery ==
In France, the Beck's logos were read out as "Best's". The "007" logos featured on the side mirrors, denoting the film Die Another Day.

== Other use ==
Fernando Alonso tested an R3 at Silverstone Circuit on 30 May 2002.

== BOSS GP ==
One of the R3s is still driven in competition regularly by Riccardo Ponzio in BOSS GP, who competed in 2021 season in the Open class. Ponzio continued to compete in 2022, although he drove in the F1 class.

== Gallery ==
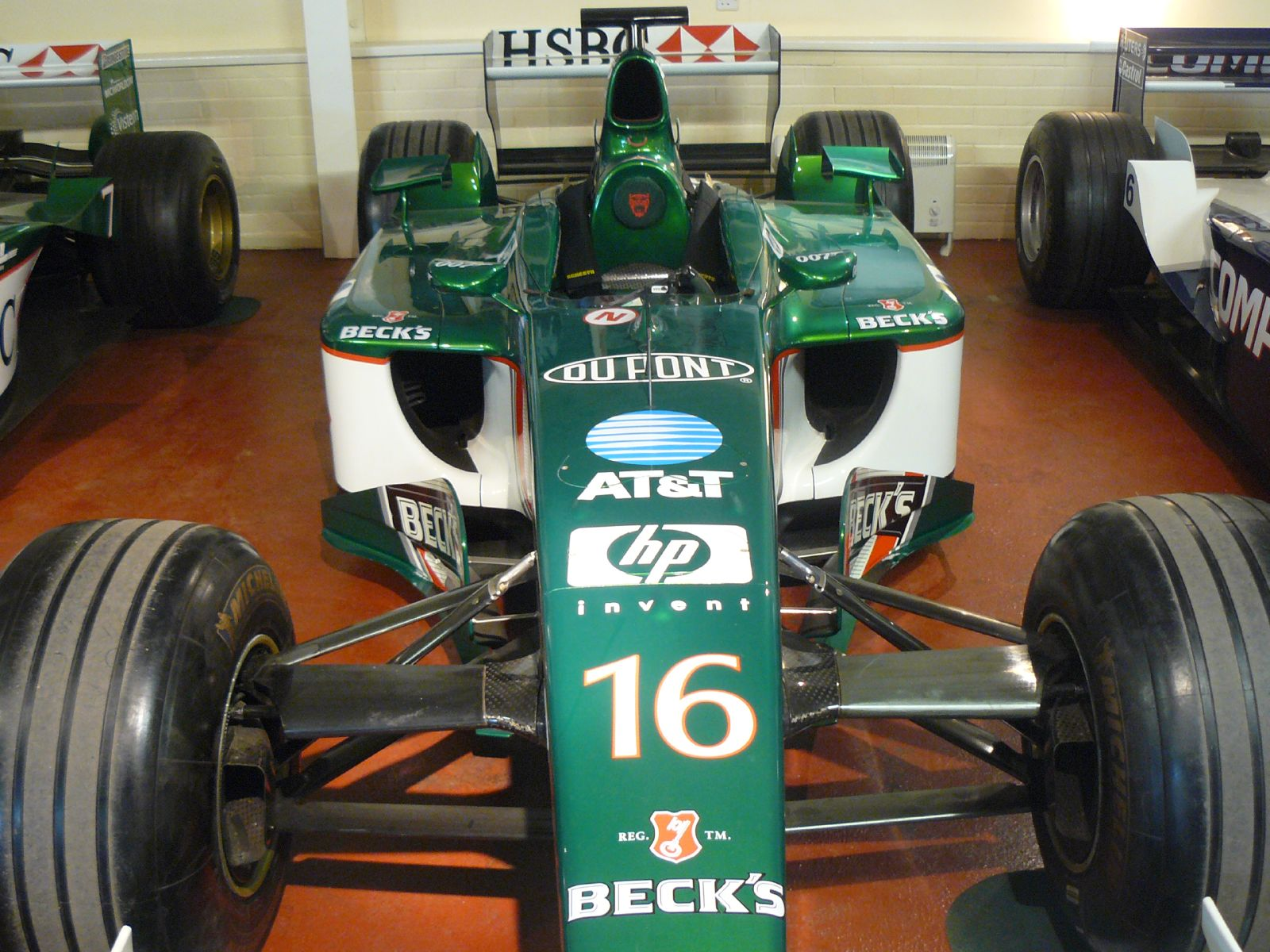
Jaguar R3 which competed in the 2002 season driven by Eddie Irvine

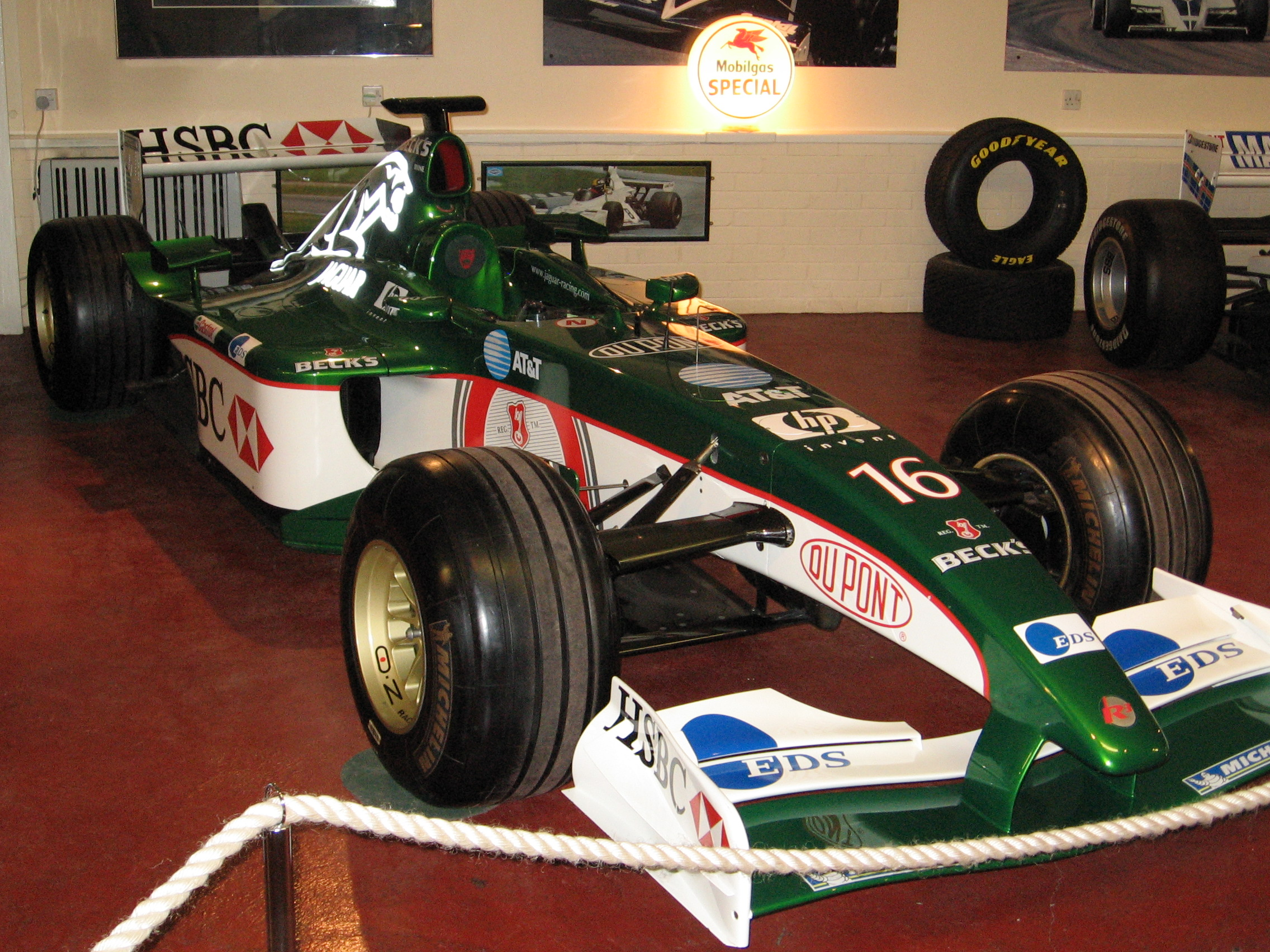
The Donington Collection's Eddie Irvine R3 from 2002

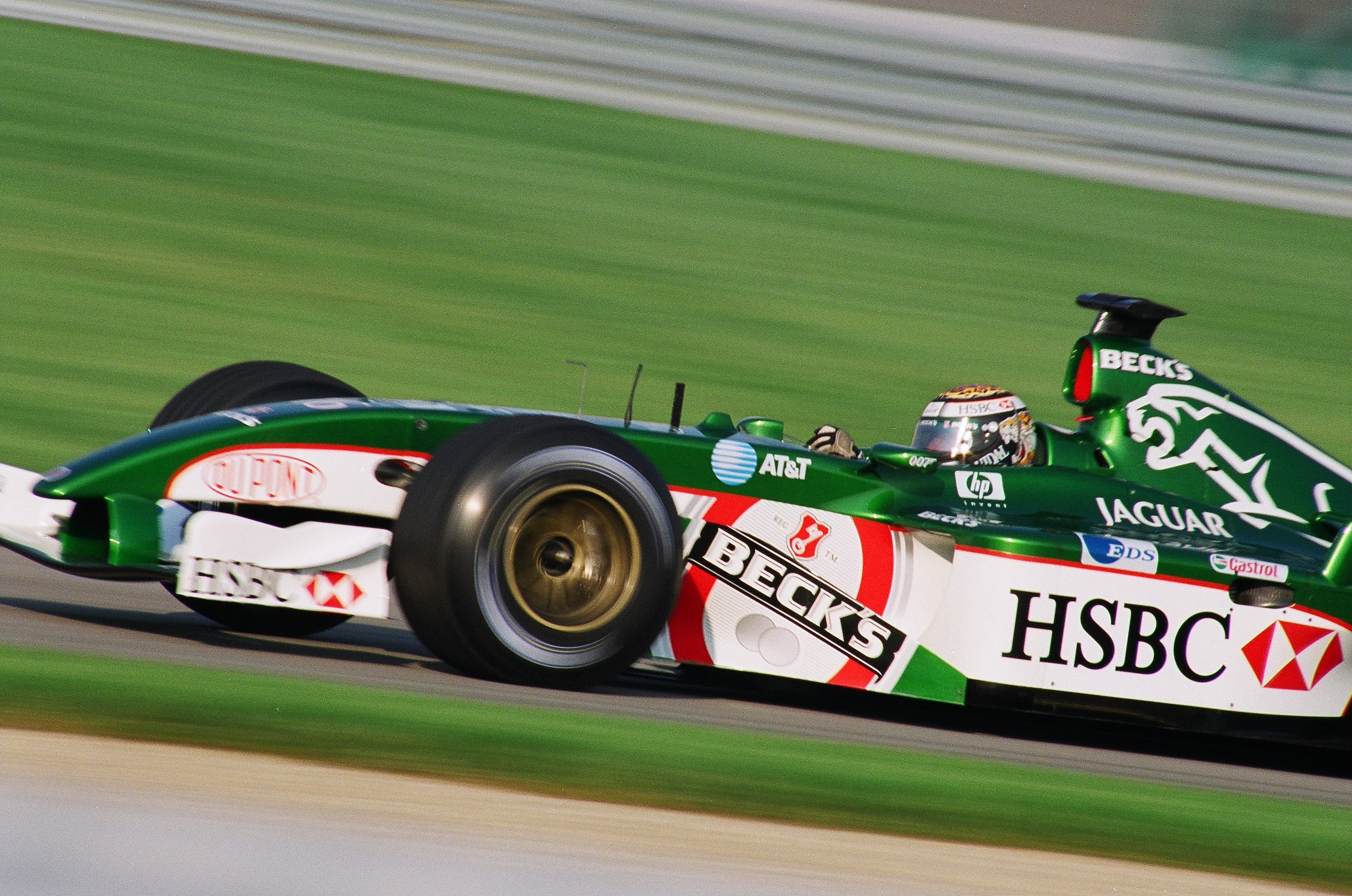
Eddie Irvine driving the Jaguar R3 at the 2002 United States Grand Prix

== Complete Formula One results ==
(key)

Year	Team	Engine	Tyres	Drivers	1	2	3	4	5	6	7	8	9	10	11	12	13	14	15	16	17	Points	WCC
2002	Jaguar	Cosworth V10	M		AUS	MAL	BRA	SMR	ESP	AUT	MON	CAN	EUR	GBR	FRA	GER	HUN	BEL	ITA	USA	JPN	8	7th
2002	Jaguar	Cosworth V10	M	(United Kingdom) Eddie Irvine	4	Ret	7	Ret	Ret	Ret	9	Ret	Ret	Ret	Ret	Ret	Ret	6	3	10	9	8	7th
2002	Jaguar	Cosworth V10	M	(Spain) Pedro de la Rosa	8	10	8	Ret	Ret	Ret	10	Ret	11	11	9	Ret	13	Ret	Ret	Ret	Ret	8	7th
