= Jaguar R2 =

Formula One racing car

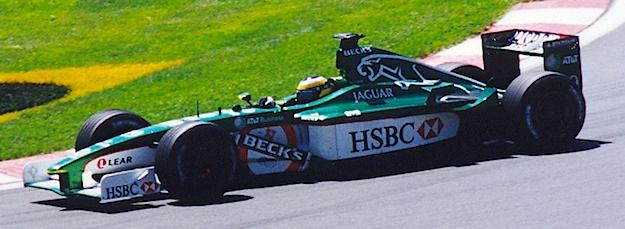
- Pedro de la Rosa driving the R2 at the 2001 Canadian Grand Prix
- Category: Formula One
- Constructor: Jaguar
- Designers: Steve Nichols (Technical Director); John Russell (Chief Designer); Frederic Vellutini (Head of Electronics); Mark Handford (Head of Aerodynamics); Nick Hayes (Engine Chief Designer - Cosworth)
- Predecessor: R1
- Successor: R3

Technical specifications
- Chassis: Carbon-fibre monocoque
- Suspension (front): double wishbones, pushrod, torsion bar, ARB, third spring
- Suspension (rear): double wishbones, pushrod, torsion bar, ARB, third spring
- Engine: Cosworth CR-3 3.0-litre V10 naturally-aspirated mid-engined
- Transmission: Jaguar 7-speed longitudinal semi-automatic sequential
- Power: 805 hp (600.3 kW) @ 17,500 rpm
- Fuel: Texaco
- Lubricants: Havoline
- Tyres: Michelin

Competition history
- Notable entrants: Jaguar Racing
- Notable drivers: 18. (United Kingdom) Eddie Irvine; 19. (Brazil) Luciano Burti; 19. (Spain) Pedro de la Rosa
- Debut: 2001 Australian Grand Prix
- Last event: 2001 Japanese Grand Prix
Races	Wins	Poles	F/Laps
17	0	0	0
- Constructors' Championships: 0
- Drivers' Championships: 0

The Jaguar R2 was the car with which the Jaguar team competed in the 2001 Formula One World Championship. It was driven by Eddie Irvine, who was in his second year with the team, and Luciano Burti, who had deputised for Irvine at the 2000 Austrian Grand Prix. However, the Brazilian was replaced by Pedro de la Rosa after only four Grands Prix.

This was the last Formula One car to run on Texaco fuel.

== Overview ==
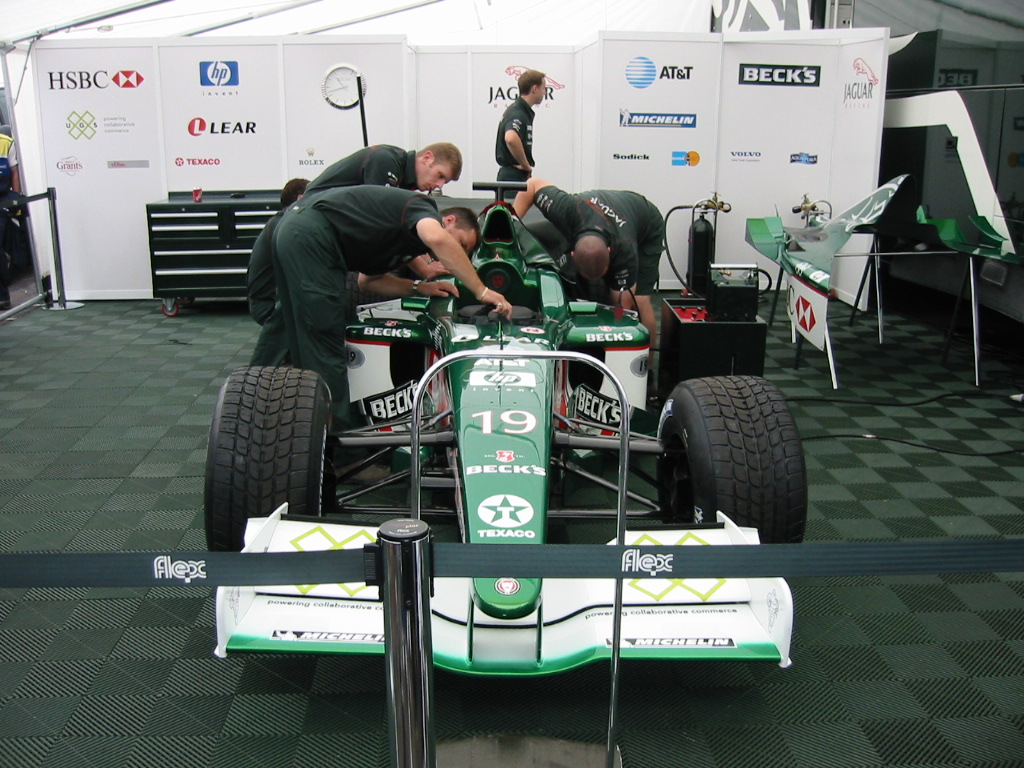
The R2 being prepared for a public appearance

For Jaguar, 2001 was a season of consolidation after a disastrous début season in 2000 saw the team score only four points in the Constructors' Championship. The car was therefore more conservative and reliable than in the previous year, and the team's success was slightly greater, if not a quantum leap forward. Indeed, there were only four points finishes from Irvine and de la Rosa throughout the season, although one of these was Jaguar's maiden podium finish at Monaco.

The season was more notable for Jaguar's exploits off the track. McLaren designer Adrian Newey seemingly signed a contract with the team, but quickly changed his mind and remained with his current employers. The deal was struck by Team Principal Bobby Rahal, and its failure, allied to an alleged deal to sell Irvine to Jordan, would culminate in his replacement by fellow retired racer Niki Lauda by season's end. It was seen that such a replacement was inevitable, as Lauda had initially arrived in the team whilst Rahal was in charge.

The team eventually finished eighth in the Constructors' Championship, with nine points. The R2 was succeeded by the Jaguar R3.

== Sponsorship and livery ==
The livery was similar to the previous season with subtle changes. In France, the Beck's logos were replaced by "Best's".

At the Italian and United States Grands Prix, the car ran with a black engine cover with an American flag in response of the September 11 attacks.

== BOSS GP ==
A Jaguar R2 runs in the BOSS GP driven by French driver Didier Sirgue.

== Complete Formula One results ==
(key)

Year	Team	Engine	Tyres	Drivers	1	2	3	4	5	6	7	8	9	10	11	12	13	14	15	16	17	Points	WCC
2001	Jaguar	Cosworth V10	M		AUS	MAL	BRA	SMR	ESP	AUT	MON	CAN	EUR	FRA	GBR	GER	HUN	BEL	ITA	USA	JPN	9	8th
2001	Jaguar	Cosworth V10	M	(United Kingdom) Eddie Irvine	11	Ret	Ret	Ret	Ret	7	3	Ret	7	Ret	9	Ret	Ret	DNS	Ret	5	Ret	9	8th
2001	Jaguar	Cosworth V10	M	(Brazil) Luciano Burti	8	10	Ret	11														9	8th
2001	Jaguar	Cosworth V10	M	(Spain) Pedro de la Rosa					Ret	Ret	Ret	6	8	14	12	Ret	11	Ret	5	12	Ret	9	8th
