= 2002 San Marino Grand Prix =

Coordinates: 44°20′38″N 11°43′00″E

Race 4 of 17 in the 2002 Formula One World Championship
← Previous race	Next race →

Race details
- Date: 14 April 2002
- Official name: Gran Premio di San Marino 2002
- Location: Autodromo Enzo e Dino Ferrari, Imola, Emilia-Romagna, Italy
- Course: Permanent racing facility
- Course length: 4.933 km (3.065 miles)
- Distance: 62 laps, 305.609 km (189.897 miles)
- Weather: Scattered thunderstorms, but remaining dry. Air Temp: 18°C
- Attendance: 90,000–100,000

Pole position
Driver	(Germany) Michael Schumacher	Ferrari
- Time: 1:21.091

Fastest lap
Driver	(Brazil) Rubens Barrichello	Ferrari
- Time: 1:24.170 on lap 48

Podium
First	(Germany) Michael Schumacher	Ferrari
Second	(Brazil) Rubens Barrichello	Ferrari
Third	(Germany) Ralf Schumacher	Williams-BMW

The 2002 San Marino Grand Prix (formally the Gran Premio di San Marino 2002) was a Formula One motor race held before between 90,000 and 100,000 spectators on 14 April 2002 at the Autodromo Enzo e Dino Ferrari, Imola, Emilia-Romagna, Italy. It was the fourth round of the 2002 Formula One World Championship and the 22nd San Marino Grand Prix. Ferrari's Michael Schumacher won the 62-lap race from pole position. His teammate Rubens Barrichello finished in second and Williams's Ralf Schumacher was third.

Going into the event, Michael Schumacher led the World Drivers' Championship from Ralf Schumacher while Williams led Ferrari in the World Constructors' Championship. After setting the fastest lap time in the one-hour qualifying session, Michael Schumacher started the Grand Prix from pole position and led for the majority of the race to claim his third victory of the season and 56th of his career. Barrichello finished second, 17.907 seconds behind, with Ralf Schumacher third, another 1.808 seconds back.

The race result meant Michael Schumacher increased his lead in the World Drivers' Championship to 14 championship points ahead of Ralf Schumacher and 17 ahead of Williams's Juan Pablo Montoya. With thirteen races left in the season, Ferrari reclaimed the lead in the World Constructors' Championship, three championship points ahead of Williams.

== Background ==
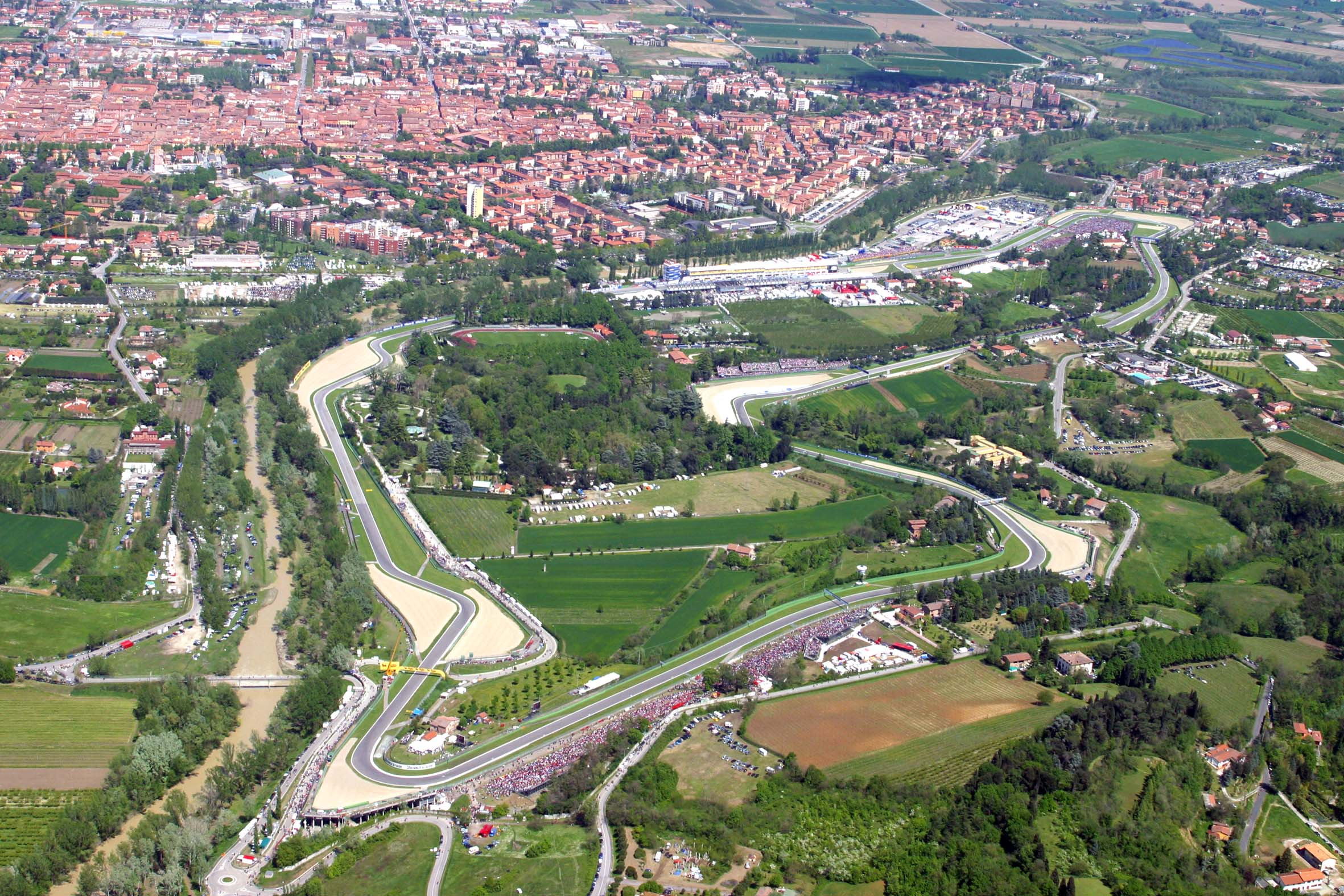
The Autodromo Enzo e Dino Ferrari (pictured in 2010), where the Grand Prix was held

The 2002 San Marino Grand Prix was the fourth round of seventeen in the 2002 Formula One World Championship and took place on 14 April 2002 at the 4.933 km (3.065 mi) anti-clockwise Autodromo Enzo e Dino Ferrari in Imola, Emilia-Romagna in Northern Italy, away from the small principality of San Marino. It was the 22nd San Marino Grand Prix, (Note: The Imola circuit held the Italian Grand Prix in 1980 before staging the San Marino Grand Prix from 1981.) the season's first European race, and one of two Grands Prix to be held in Italy. There were eleven teams (each representing a different constructor) with two drivers each for the Grand Prix, with no changes from the season entry list.

Going into the race, Ferrari's Michael Schumacher led the World Drivers' Championship with 24 championship points, eight ahead of Williams's Ralf Schumacher. Juan Pablo Montoya, the second Williams driver, was third with 14 championship points, while Renault's Jenson Button was fourth with 6. Williams led the World Constructors' Championship with 30 championship points, six ahead of Ferrari. McLaren and Renault were third and fourth with eight and six championship points, respectively.

Following the Brazilian Grand Prix on 31 March, eight of the eleven teams tested their cars, racing setups, tyres, car components and reliability checks for three days at Spain's Circuit Ricardo Tormo from 2 to 4 April as preparation for the San Marino Grand Prix. Sauber's Nick Heidfeld was fastest on the first day, with McLaren's Kimi Räikkönen leading the second and final days. Ferrari spent five days testing electronics, Bridgestone tyres, and an artificially wet circuit at their private test track, Italy's Fiorano Circuit, alongside Michael Schumacher and test driver Luca Badoer. Rubens Barrichello and teammate Michael Schumacher tested the Ferrari F2002's racing setup and ran extensive runs at Italy's Mugello Circuit. Minardi's Mark Webber spent a day testing the PS02's car and electrical components at Italy's Misano Adriatico track. Arrows were the only team that did not test due to a lack of finance, instead focusing on working privately at its headquarters in Leafield.

Michael Schumacher expected Williams to be the best team at Imola due to their car's top speed, adding, "From our experience last year, we’re aware that the race won’t be easy, but we also know that we’ve improved since then." Barrichello had collected no championship points in the first three races, but declared his championship would begin in Imola with the F2002 car, "I've been in the lead three times, and I've retired three times. That means that sooner or later I will win." Ralf Schumacher won his first Grand Prix at Imola the previous year and felt there was no reason Williams could not be competitive because the circuit's layout suited him.

At Imola, teams worked on braking systems, although the intermittent rain during the Friday free practice sessions prevented material experimentation. Several teams tested wider air intakes to improve brake disc cooling. Ferrari delivered four F2002s and offered one to Barrichello, who had driven a year-old F2001B car for the opening three rounds. McLaren introduced a new rear suspension designed for the MP4-17's Michelin tyres while Jordan added an additional wing profile on the EJ12's anti-roll bar. Renault introduced new front wing endplates but not the suspension tested in Spain. Honda supplied British American Racing (BAR) and Jordan with the latest development of its V10 engine, the RA002E, which was modified to reduce internal friction and increase RPMs. Toyota debuted a new engine with improved driveability, as well as revised front and rear wings, at Imola.

== Practice ==
Preceding the race were two one-hour practices on Friday and two 45-minute sessions on Saturday. The first practice session took place on Friday morning in cold, overcast and wet weather conditions, the first time in the season teams and drivers experienced cool and wet conditions at a Grand Prix. Rain fell on the circuit hours before the practice and continued to fall severely until it eased at the halfway point. Several drivers get acquainted with the damp conditions since rain was expected for qualifying. Michael Schumacher lapped fastest with a time of 1:37.486, ahead of Jordan's Giancarlo Fisichella, Barrichello, Räikkönen, Arrows's Heinz-Harald Frentzen, Renault's Jarno Trulli, Sauber's Felipe Massa, Ralf Schumacher, McLaren's David Coulthard and Heidfeld in positions two to ten. Multiple drivers aquaplaned off the track and into the grass or the gravel traps during the practice.

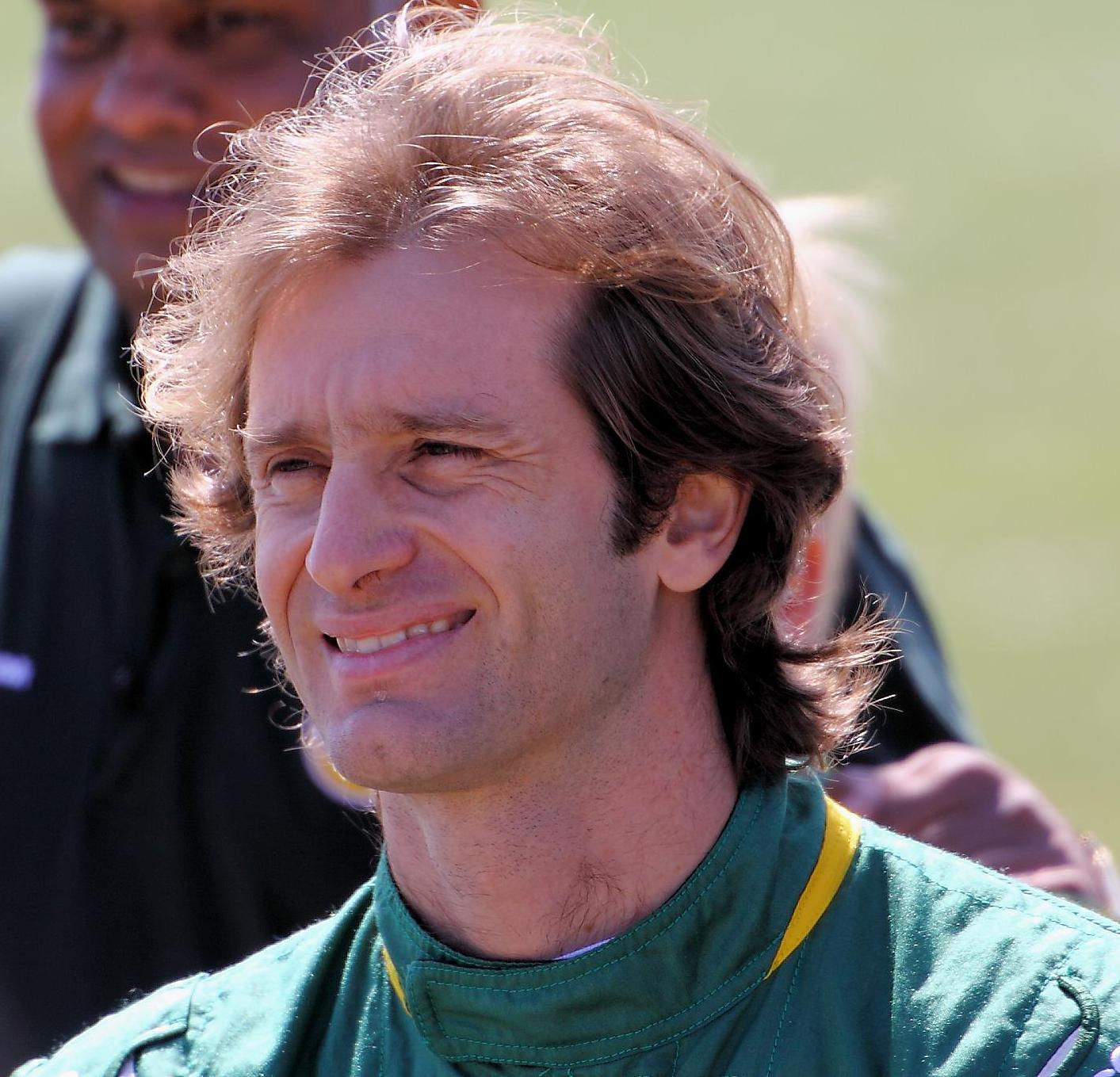
Jarno Trulli (pictured in 2011) damaged his Renault in a crash during the second free practice session.

By the second practice session later in the afternoon, the rain had stopped and the air and track temperatures had risen marginally. The circuit was still wet and had standing water, however some drivers used intermediate tyres. Michael Schumacher set the day's fastest lap of 1:36.898. Barrichello, Fisichella, the McLaren pairing of Coulthard and Räikkönen, Frentzen, Trulli, Massa, Montoya and Ralf Schumacher completed the top ten. Drivers again went off the track during the session. Trulli damaged his Renault's right-front suspension and removed the front wing against the Variante Bassa chicane barrier before the pit lane. On the start/finish straight's grass verge, he abandoned the car facing the opposite direction. With 15 minutes remaining, Michael Schumacher was lapping faster when he lost control of his Ferrari's rear clipping a kerb exiting the Variante Alta chicane after running slightly off the racing line overtaking an Arrows car. He stalled despite regaining control and stopped at the side of the circuit. (Note: Attributed to multiple references:)

The third practice session on Saturday morning was sunny, but overnight rain had left the track slightly damp, causing most drivers to use intermediate tyres, but it was not dry enough for dry tyres until near the end of the session. Because of the mild ambient and track temperatures, the circuit dried slowly and got faster as the session progressed. Montoya went fastest towards the conclusion of the session with a 1:29.718 lap, 0.081 seconds quicker than his teammate Ralf Schumacher in second. Coulthard, Michael Schumacher, Frentzen, BAR teammates Jacques Villeneuve and Olivier Panis, Fisichella, Barrichello and Massa followed in the top ten. Some drivers went off the racing line and off the circuit during the session.

During the last practice session, the dry line began to extend throughout the course, but it remained slippery in parts. Lap times reduced as the circuit dried, and drivers utilised grooved tyres before it got completely dry with less than ten minutes left.. Michael Schumacher slipstreamed Trulli across the start/finish line and set the session's fastest lap time of 1:23.046 with a minute remaining. Coulthard, Barrichello, Heidfeld, Ralf Schumacher, Montoya, Räikkönen, Button, Villeneuve and Frentzen occupied positions two through ten. More drivers again ran off the track and lost control of their cars during practice.

== Qualifying ==
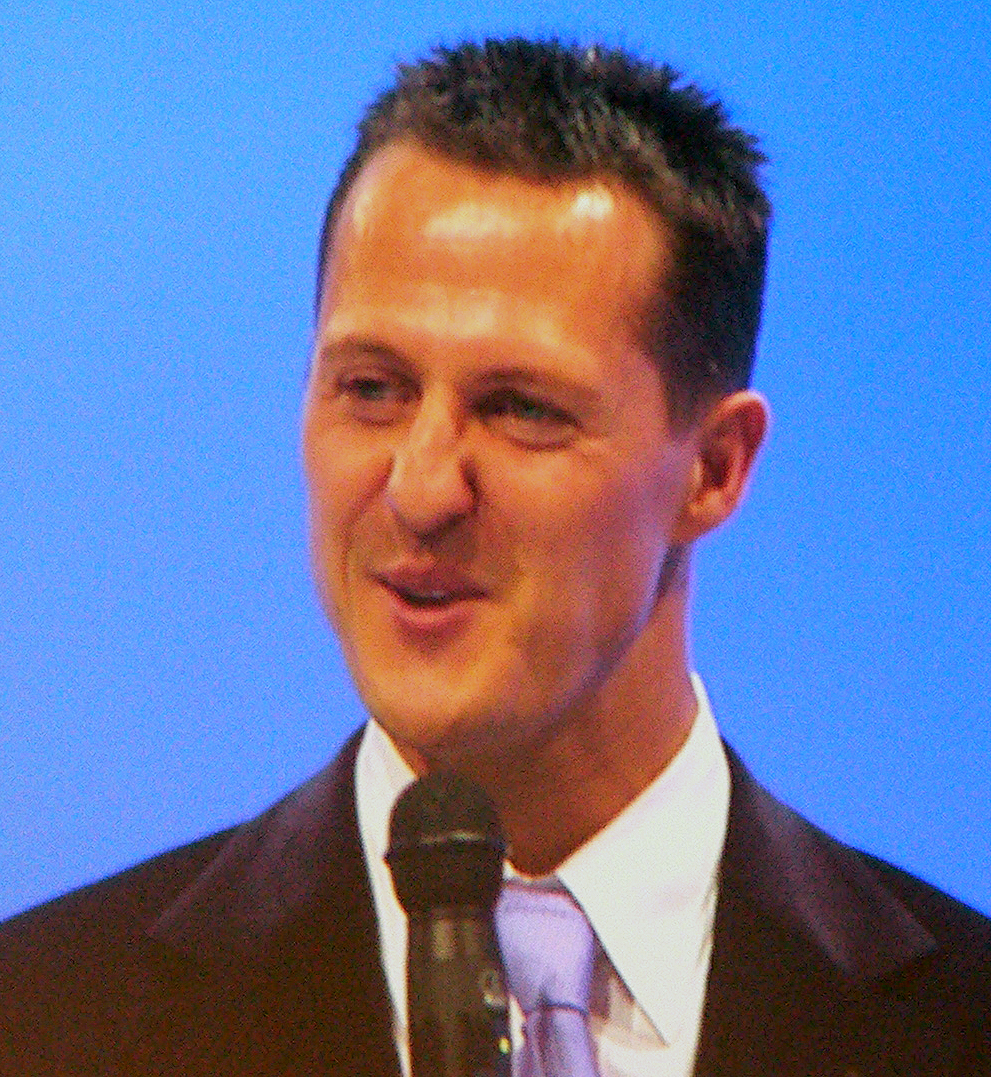
Michael Schumacher (pictured in 2007) qualified on pole position for the 45th time in his career and went on to win the race the following day.

Each driver was allowed twelve laps during Saturday's one-hour qualifying session, with starting positions determined by the drivers' quickest laps. During this session, the 107% rule was in effect, requiring each driver to remain within 107% of the quickest lap time in order to qualify for the race. Rainfall was forecast but never materialised despite overcast weather, and the track was dry. Having made minor driver errors on two earlier runs, Michael Schumacher took his 45th career pole position with a track lap record of 1:21.091 in the last seconds of qualifying with no traffic, breaking Coulthard's pole record from 2001. Barrichello did not complete all of his fast runs, coming second, 0.064 seconds behind. He held pole position for most of qualifying until his teammate's lap, and his final run was hampered by a car ahead of him kicking up dust at the Variante Alta chicane exit. The Williams pairing of Ralf Schumacher and Montoya were third and fourth. Ralf Schumacher made a minor error at the Villeneuve chicane on his final lap, and Montoya reported excessive understeer, failing to improve his final run through errors midway through the circuit. Coulthard had to wait until a replacement Mercedes-Benz V10 engine was put into his car because an engine failed between the final practice session and qualifying, and was absent until 23 minutes had passed before qualifying fifth. Räikkönen, sixth, lost control of his McLaren's rear leaving the second Rivazza turn on his third run, but was able to regain control and avoid stalling the engine. Heidfeld took seventh after losing time putting a wheel onto the grass on his fastest lap. Trulli reported slower cars affecting each of his runs and was eighth; his final run was affected by Panis spinning ahead of him. His teammate Button was ninth, having worked on optimising his racing setup before making an error at Rivazza corner on his last run. Villeneuve, 10th, aggressively mounted the kerbs.

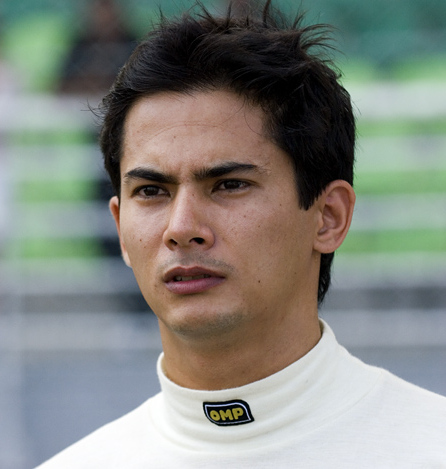
Alex Yoong (pictured in 2006) failed to qualify for the race.

Massa in 11th oversteered in the faster corners and under braking, unable to find the best handling balance for qualifying. Panis took 12th due to a lack of grip and excess oversteer, notably in the final sector. Frentzen, 13th, drove a car lacking a good handling balance. Takuma Sato improved on each of his runs and qualified 14th, ahead of his Jordan teammate Fisichella (15th) for the first time in the season. On his first run, Fisichella's car's hydraulics failed, so he drove the spare car, which was not properly setup. Toyota teammates Mika Salo and Allan McNish qualified 16th and 17th. Salo reported that his car lacked grip and did not ride the circuit's kerbs. The Jaguar pairing of Eddie Irvine and Pedro de la Rosa were 18th and 21st. Both drivers were impacted by a lack of aerodynamic downforce in the Jaguar R3 caused by generating tyre temperature in colder weather compared to the heat in Brazil. Webber was the sole Minardi driver to qualify for the Grand Prix in 19th, using the spare Minardi car after an engine issue. Arrows's Enrique Bernoldi had smoke billowing from his car's rear due to an engine failure on his first run and ran back to the pit lane. He switched to the spare Arrows A23 car, losing a set of tyres, and qualified 21st after being delayed on his final run. Minardi's Alex Yoong spun off at the Variante Alta corner on his last lap. Yoong failed to set a lap within 107% of Michael Schumacher's pole time and was barred from starting the race under FIA regulations after the stewards determined there were "no special circumstances" to grant him dispensation. This meant 21 drivers would begin the Grand Prix.

=== Qualifying classification ===
Pos	No	Driver	Constructor	Lap	Gap	Grid
1	1	(Germany) Michael Schumacher	Ferrari	1:21.091	—	1
2	2	(Brazil) Rubens Barrichello	Ferrari	1:21.155	+0.064	2
3	5	(Germany) Ralf Schumacher	Williams-BMW	1:21.476	+0.385	3
4	6	(Colombia) Juan Pablo Montoya	Williams-BMW	1:21.605	+0.514	4
5	4	(Finland) Kimi Räikkönen	McLaren-Mercedes	1:22.104	+1.013	5
6	3	(United Kingdom) David Coulthard	McLaren-Mercedes	1:22.490	+1.399	6
7	7	(Germany) Nick Heidfeld	Sauber-Petronas	1:22.767	+1.676	7
8	14	(Italy) Jarno Trulli	Renault	1:22.833	+1.742	8
9	15	(United Kingdom) Jenson Button	Renault	1:22.857	+1.766	9
10	11	(Canada) Jacques Villeneuve	BAR-Honda	1:23.116	+2.025	10
11	8	(Brazil) Felipe Massa	Sauber-Petronas	1:23.681	+2.590	11
12	12	(France) Olivier Panis	BAR-Honda	1:23.821	+2.730	12
13	20	(Germany) Heinz-Harald Frentzen	Arrows-Cosworth	1:23.862	+2.771	13
14	10	(Japan) Takuma Sato	Jordan-Honda	1:24.050	+2.959	14
15	9	(Italy) Giancarlo Fisichella	Jordan-Honda	1:24.253	+3.162	15
16	24	(Finland) Mika Salo	Toyota	1:24.328	+3.237	16
17	25	(United Kingdom) Allan McNish	Toyota	1:24.331	+3.240	17
18	16	(United Kingdom) Eddie Irvine	Jaguar-Cosworth	1:24.579	+3.488	18
19	23	(Australia) Mark Webber	Minardi-Asiatech	1:24.790	+3.699	19
20	21	(Brazil) Enrique Bernoldi	Arrows-Cosworth	1:24.808	+3.717	20
21	17	(Spain) Pedro de la Rosa	Jaguar-Cosworth	1:24.852	+3.761	21
107% time: 1:26.767
DNQ	22	(Malaysia) Alex Yoong	Minardi-Asiatech	1:27.241	+6.150	—

== Warm-up ==
On race morning, a half-hour warm-up session was held in cool and dry weather, during which drivers and teams shook down their race and spare cars and tested intermediate tyres before the race. Barrichello lapped fastest at 1:25.483. In positions two to ten were Michael Schumacher, Montoya, Heidfeld, Massa, Räikkönen, Coulthard, Villeneuve, Button and Bernoldi. Other than Michael Schumacher going into the gravel trap and Trulli suffering an engine failure late on, there were no major incidents during the session.

== Race ==
A heavy cloud was over the circuit and a brief rain shower fell 30 minutes before the start, but the circuit remained dry when their drivers took up their grid places and it became sunny. The air temperature was between 16 and 17 °C (61 and 63 °F). and the track temperature was 21 °C (70 °F). The 62-lap race commenced before between 90,000 and 100,000 spectators at 14:00 local time. (Note: Sources vary on the attendance, with 90,000 and 100,000.) Michael Schumacher maintained the race lead heading into the Tamburello chicane after the red lights went out. Behind him, Ralf Schumacher made a fast start to draw alongside the slow-starting Barrichello on the track's dirty side. He lined up his Ferrari for a straighter run and provided him with enough space. Ralf Schumacher took second on the inside into Tamburello despite locking his tyres under braking and regaining control of his car. Barrichello held off the slow-starting Montoya to maintain third. Trulli and Button's Renaults made quick starts because of their powerful launch control systems, passing Heidfeld for seventh and eighth. McNish pulled over onto the grass to retire after losing power in his car's transmission.

At the conclusion of the first lap, Michael Schumacher led Ralf Schumacher by 1.3 seconds. They were followed by Barrichello, Montoya, Räikkönen and Coulthard. Michael Schumacher began to pull away from the field, increasing his lead over Ralf Schumacher to four seconds by the end of lap five. Meanwhile, Frentzen overtook Sato for 13th while Fisichella passed Irvine for 17th on lap two. Sato slowed on lap six due to a gearbox issue that left him locked in first gear. He returned to the pit lane, where Jordan attempted to reset the electronics. The problem reoccurred, and Sato pulled over onto the grass at the Villeneuve chicane, retiring from the race. Bernoldi overtook Salo for 14th on the same lap. By lap 10, Michael Schumacher had extended his lead to eight seconds, with Barrichello a second behind, with Barrichello gaining on Ralf Schumacher.

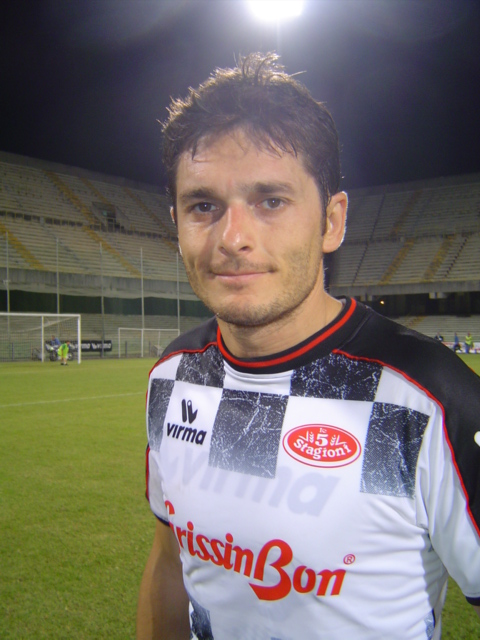
Giancarlo Fisichella (pictured in 2008) was one of ten drivers to retire from the Grand Prix.

Heidfeld made the race's first pit stop on lap 17, believing Sauber had told him over the radio to enter the pit lane, but this was not the case. The stop was complicated by a refuelling nozzle failure, which prevented fuel from entering his car and kept him stationary for 17.9 seconds. Heidfeld consequently dropped from ninth to 16th, passing two drivers. On lap 20, he made a second pit stop to refuel, which this time was successful. On the next lap, Fisichella pulled off onto the grass at the Tosa hairpin, retiring due to a hydraulic pressure loss. On laps 23 and 24, Trulli and Button made their first pit stops, with Button ahead of his Renault teammate due to his faster pit stop. On lap 26, the FIA stewards issued Heidfeld a drive-through penalty for speeding in the pit lane during his second pit stop, serving it shortly after.

Frentzen retired on the grass on lap 27 after losing fuel rail pressure unexpectedly. Salo retired to the Toyota garage two laps later after losing use of traction control and fourth gear. As the race approached halfway, Michael Schumacher led Ralf Schumacher by 17 seconds, and Barrichello was still putting pressure on the lead Williams driver. Räikkönen was the first of the top six to make a pit stop on lap 31. His 10.8-second stop dropped him behind teammate Coulthard. Ferrari and Williams were both executing two-stop strategies after converting from one-stop strategies, and they carried fuel in their vehicles in case their plans changed sooner in the race. Michael Schumacher made his pit stop from the race lead on lap 31, followed by Ralf Schumacher on the same lap. Barrichello took the lead for one lap and pushed hard to pass Ralf Schumacher before his pit stop on lap 32. His 7.4-second stop moved him past Ralf Schumacher. Meanwhile, De la Rosa retired on the side of the track where the pit lane joined the circuit due to a driveshaft failure on the same lap.

Montoya made his first pit stop on lap 33, and after a 6.8-second stop, he remained fourth. Coulthard was underpowered relative to his competitors, and his first pit stop came two laps later. His 7.2-second stop dropped him from fifth to seventh, behind Button who took over sixth. Ralf Schumacher was unable to keep up with Barrichello, who began to pull away. The second round of pit stops began on lap 38. Button took his second pit stop four laps later, dropping from sixth to seventh behind Coulthard. Panis retired from the race when the throttle linkage broke and the engine failed on his 44th lap. Räikkönen's car pumped hot gasses onto the rear suspension from a broken exhaust system, as detected by telemetry. On lap 45, McLaren engineers instructed him to enter pit lane and drive into the garage to retire as a precaution. Räikkönen's retirement promoted Button to fifth and Coulthard to sixth.

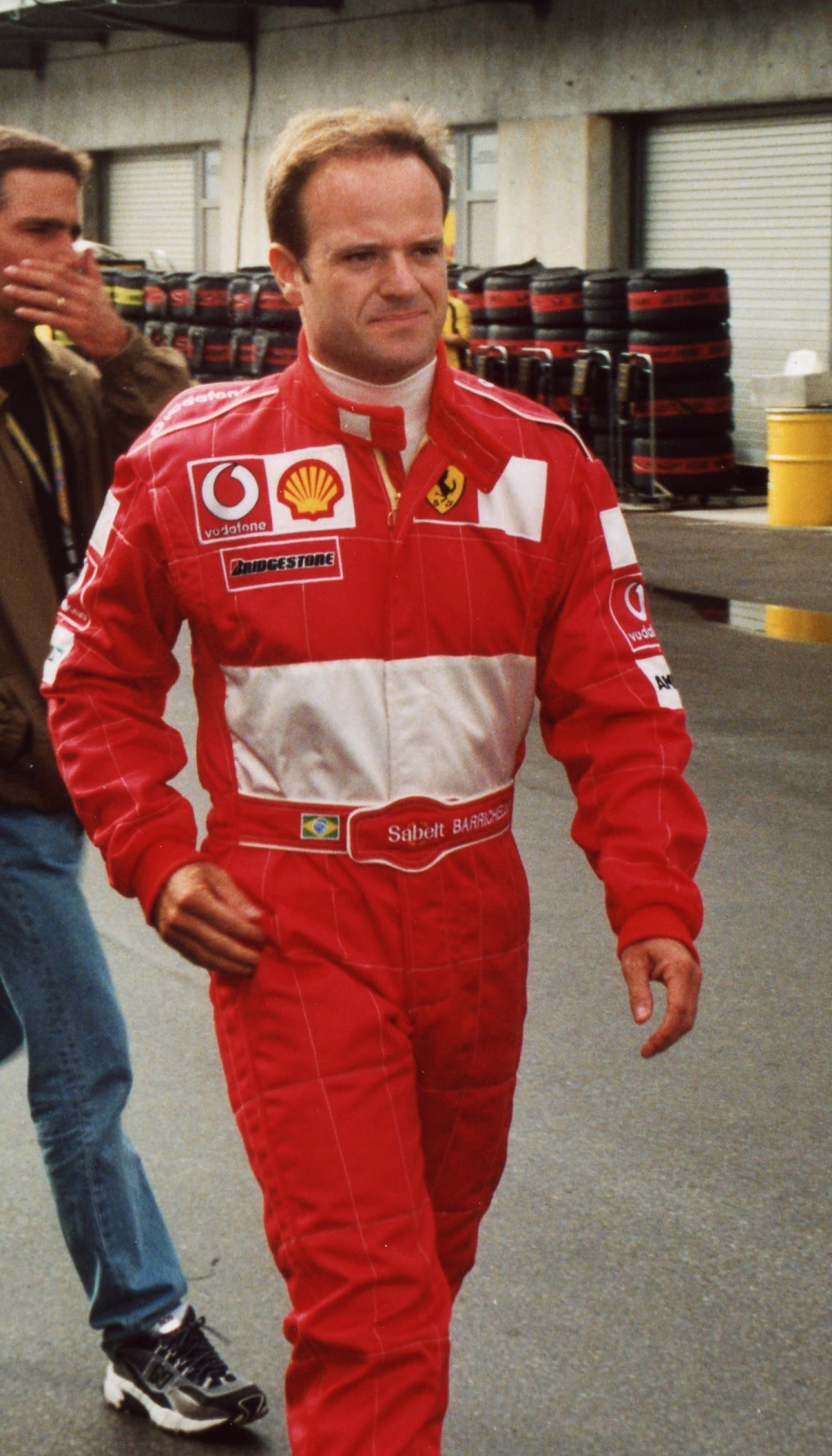
Rubens Barrichello registered his points score of the season and race finish coming in second.

Michael Schumacher made his second pit stop from the lead on lap 46, moving Barrichello into first. Ralf Schumacher entered the pit lane on the same lap, falling behind teammate Montoya. Barrichello's second pit stop came at the end of lap 47, but it proved difficult. Ferrari had problems putting the left-rear tyre when a wheel nut became stuck in the wheel, but he retained second, behind Michael Schumacher, because his lead over Ralf Schumacher was large enough to keep him ahead of the Williams driver. Irvine stopped his car on the next lap at the pit lane exit due to a driveshaft failure. Montoya made his second pit stop on the same lap, remaining in fourth. Coulthard's stop came on lap 49 and fell behind Button because McLaren did not change his Michelin tyres. After the pit stops had been completed, Michael Schumacher led from Barrichello, Montoya, Button and Coulthard.

Bernoldi retired from the race after becoming stranded in the gravel trap at Rivazza turn owing to a loss of water pressure on lap 52. Yellow flags were waved because there was an exhaust system possibly from Bernoldi's car on the circuit. During lap 60, Massa came up on Trulli and passed him on the inside while braking at the first Rivazza corner's entry for eighth. Massa began to pull clear from Trulli. Michael Schumacher led for the rest of the race, securing his third victory in four races this season and 56th of his career. After three consecutive retirements in 2002, Barrichello finished second, 17.907 seconds behind, recording his first points and finish of the season. Ralf Schumacher closed up to Barrichello in the final laps and took third. Montoya finished fourth due to understeer that did not improve once his tyres were clean. Button finished fifth for his third consecutive points score and was the last driver on the lead lap. Coulthard drove a low-grip McLaren, and despite a wing adjustment, he was the final points scorer in sixth, one lap down. Villeneuve drove cautiously to finish seventh, ahead of Massa in eighth. Trulli's performance dropped, probably because his gearbox overheated, finishing ninth. Heidfeld and Webber were the final finishers. Just 11 of the 21 starters finished the Grand Prix.

=== Post-race ===
The top three drivers appeared on the podium to collect their trophies and spoke to the media in the subsequent press conference. Michael Schumacher said there were "obviously many reasons to be proud and happy" after retiring from the previous year's race, adding, "It's the first home Grand Prix for us this year. It is, as you said, a special Grand Prix for me here today in the history of Ferrari, so therefore I am more than proud to have done it this way." Barrichello was relieved to finish a race and called it "one of my best weekends in terms of car set-up and car balance, because it's been a really wonderful car." Ralf Schumacher said finishing third was the best possible result for his Williams team but was disappointed by Ferrari's dominant victory, "We went to the last two races with the impression we could win them, we failed, twice, so why should be too happy about it?".

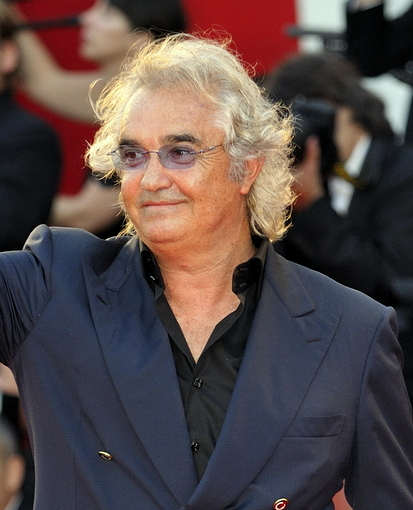
Flavio Briatore (pictured in 2009) praised Renault driver Jenson Button for his performance in the race.

Montoya was disappointed to finish fourth, saying "I was expecting more from this race. There was simply nothing more there." Button called his fifth-place result "the best race of my F1 career", saying, "I got to fifth position not by people falling out but because we were quick enough. I pushed every lap to be as consistent as possible and to be as quick as possible – and it worked." Renault team principal Flavio Briatore told Button, "Great drive". Coulthard said McLaren struggled more than he had expected and felt he could extract more from his car. He said about being lapped by Michael Schumacher "I can't remember the last time I was lapped. I wished I had a lasso to throw onto his wing." Barrichello complained that Irvine delayed him for several corners while he was lapping him and gesticulated to him, adding "He's getting old." Irvine retorted, "I may be older than Rubens but I'll never be as ugly." He added Barrichello was being overly emotional and that he moved over for him.

Despite Ralf Schumacher hailing the car as well-balanced during the race, Williams technical director Patrick Head felt the team was not quick enough, adding, "We've got some homework to do, simple as that." The result extended Michael Schumacher's World Drivers' Championship lead to 14 championship points over Ralf Schumacher. Montoya remained third with 17 championship points while Button stayed fourth with eight. Barrichello's second-place finish moved him into fifth. With a one-two finish at Imola, Ferrari reclaimed the World Constructors' Championship lead from Williams by three points. McLaren and Renault remained in third and fourth with thirteen rounds remaining in the season.

=== Race classification ===
Drivers who scored championship points are denoted in bold.

Pos	No	Driver	Constructor	Tyre	Laps	Time/Retired	Grid	Points
1	1	(Germany) **Michael Schumacher**	**Ferrari**	B	62	1:29:10.789	1	10
2	2	(Brazil) **Rubens Barrichello**	**Ferrari**	B	62	+17.907	2	6
3	5	(Germany) **Ralf Schumacher**	**Williams-BMW**	M	62	+19.755	3	4
4	6	(Colombia) **Juan Pablo Montoya**	**Williams-BMW**	M	62	+44.725	4	3
5	15	(United Kingdom) **Jenson Button**	**Renault**	M	62	+1:23.395	9	2
6	3	(United Kingdom) **David Coulthard**	**McLaren-Mercedes**	M	61	+1 Lap	6	1
7	11	(Canada) Jacques Villeneuve	BAR-Honda	B	61	+1 Lap	10	
8	8	(Brazil) Felipe Massa	Sauber-Petronas	B	61	+1 Lap	11	
9	14	(Italy) Jarno Trulli	Renault	M	61	+1 Lap	8	
10	7	(Germany) Nick Heidfeld	Sauber-Petronas	B	61	+1 Lap	7	
11	23	(Australia) Mark Webber	Minardi-Asiatech	M	60	+2 Laps	19	
Ret	21	(Brazil) Enrique Bernoldi	Arrows-Cosworth	B	50	Power loss	20	
Ret	16	(United Kingdom) Eddie Irvine	Jaguar-Cosworth	M	45	Driveshaft	18	
Ret	4	(Finland) Kimi Räikkönen	McLaren-Mercedes	M	44	Exhaust pipe	5	
Ret	12	(France) Olivier Panis	BAR-Honda	B	44	Throttle	12	
Ret	17	(Spain) Pedro de la Rosa	Jaguar-Cosworth	M	30	Driveshaft	21	
Ret	24	(Finland) Mika Salo	Toyota	M	26	Gearbox	16	
Ret	20	(Germany) Heinz-Harald Frentzen	Arrows-Cosworth	B	25	Power loss	13	
Ret	9	(Italy) Giancarlo Fisichella	Jordan-Honda	B	19	Hydraulics	15	
Ret	10	(Japan) Takuma Sato	Jordan-Honda	B	5	Gearbox	14	
Ret	25	(United Kingdom) Allan McNish	Toyota	M	0	Electrical	17	
DNQ	22	(Malaysia) Alex Yoong	Minardi-Asiatech	M	—	107% Rule	—	

== Championship standings after the race ==
Drivers' Championship standings

+/–	Pos	Driver	Points
	1	(Germany) Michael Schumacher	34
	2	(Germany) Ralf Schumacher	20
	3	(Colombia) Juan Pablo Montoya	17
	4	(United Kingdom) Jenson Button	8
14	5	(Brazil) Rubens Barrichello	6

Constructors' Championship standings

+/–	Pos	Constructor	Points
1	1	(Italy) Ferrari	40
1	2	(United Kingdom) Williams-BMW	37
	3	(United Kingdom) McLaren-Mercedes	9
	4	(France) Renault	8
	5	(United Kingdom) Jaguar-Cosworth	3
Sources:

- Note: Only the top five positions are included for both sets of standings.

== Notes ==
Previous race: 2002 Brazilian Grand Prix	FIA Formula One World Championship; 2002 season	Next race: 2002 Spanish Grand Prix
Previous race: 2001 San Marino Grand Prix	San Marino Grand Prix	Next race: 2003 San Marino Grand Prix
