= 2002 British Grand Prix =

Race 10 of 17 in the 2002 Formula One World Championship
← Previous race	Next race →
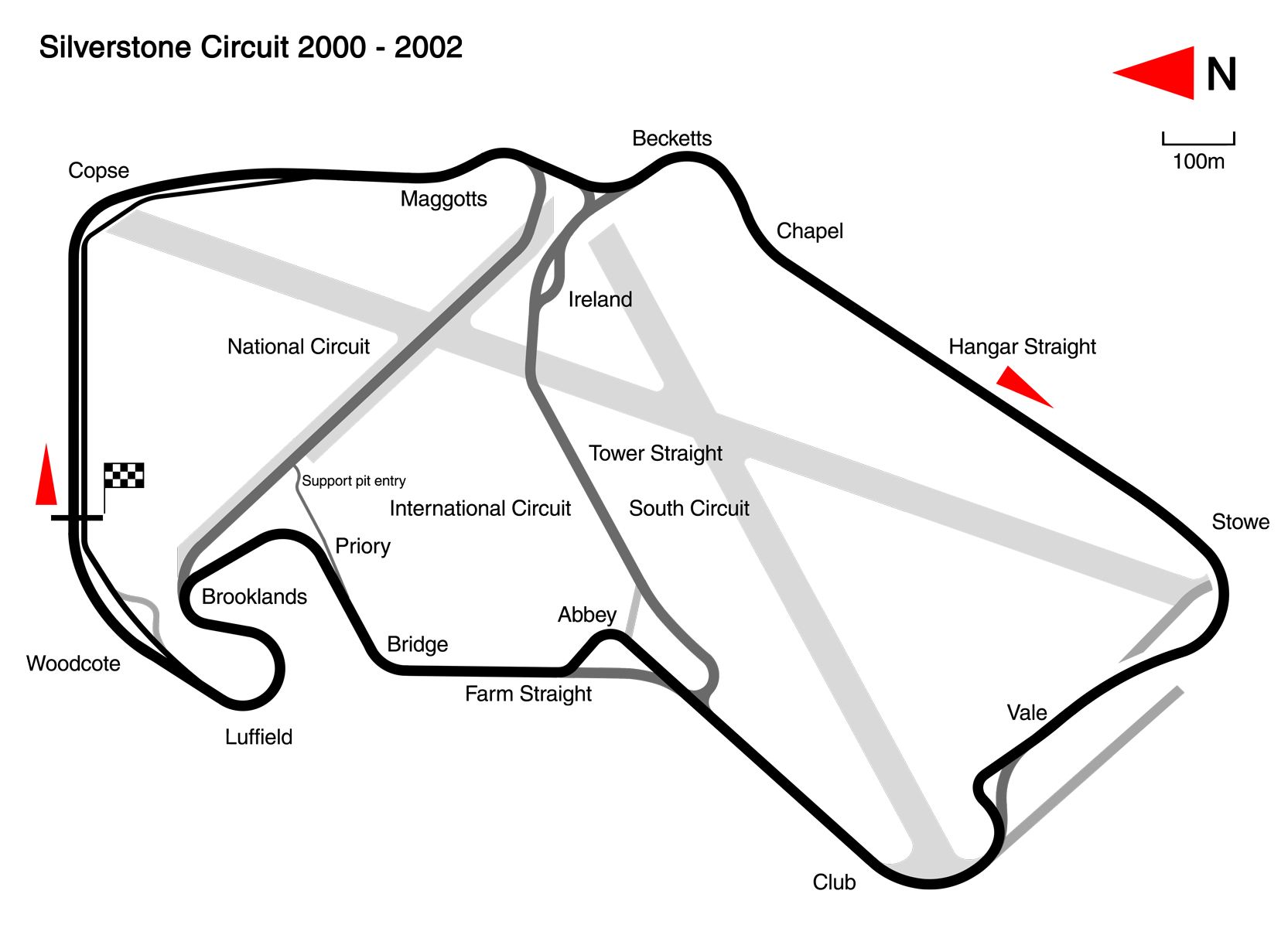
- Silverstone Circuit in its 2002 configuration

Race details
- Date: 7 July 2002
- Official name: 2002 Foster's British Grand Prix
- Location: Silverstone Circuit, Silverstone, Northamptonshire and Buckinghamshire, England
- Course: Permanent Road Facility
- Course length: 5.141 km (3.194 miles)
- Distance: 60 laps, 308.46 km (191.603 miles)
- Weather: Dry/Wet, Air Temp: 21°C
- Attendance: 65,000

Pole position
Driver	(Colombia) Juan Pablo Montoya	Williams-BMW
- Time: 1:18.998

Fastest lap
Driver	(Brazil) Rubens Barrichello	Ferrari
- Time: 1:23.083 on lap 58

Podium
First	(Germany) Michael Schumacher	Ferrari
Second	(Brazil) Rubens Barrichello	Ferrari
Third	(Colombia) Juan Pablo Montoya	Williams-BMW

The 2002 British Grand Prix (formally the 2002 Foster's British Grand Prix) was a Formula One motor race held at the Silverstone Circuit, England, United Kingdom before 60,000 spectators on 7 July 2002. It was the 10th of 17 rounds in the 2002 Formula One World Championship and was the 53rd time that the British Grand Prix had been included in the championship since 1950. Ferrari's Michael Schumacher won the 60-lap race after starting from second position. His teammate Rubens Barrichello finished in second and Williams driver Juan Pablo Montoya was third.

Heading into the Grand Prix, Michael Schumacher led the World Drivers' Championship from Montoya's teammate Ralf Schumacher and Ferrari led Williams in the World Constructors' Championship. Montoya qualified on pole position by setting the fastest lap time in the one-hour qualifying session, with Barrichello starting second. However, Barrichello stalled on the formation lap and Montoya led the first 15 laps before an increase in rainfall allowed Michael Schumacher to pass him for the race lead on lap 16. Michael Schumacher led for the rest of the race, claiming his seventh victory of the season and 60th of his career. Despite losing control of his Ferrari halfway through the race, Barrichello finished second, 14.5 seconds behind.

The Grand Prix result increased Michael Schumacher's World Drivers' Championship lead to 54 championship points. Barrichello's second-place finish moved him from fourth to second while Montoya's third-place result kept him in third. Ferrari maintained a 57-point lead over Williams in the World Constructors' Championship, while McLaren remained third with seven races left in the season.

== Background ==
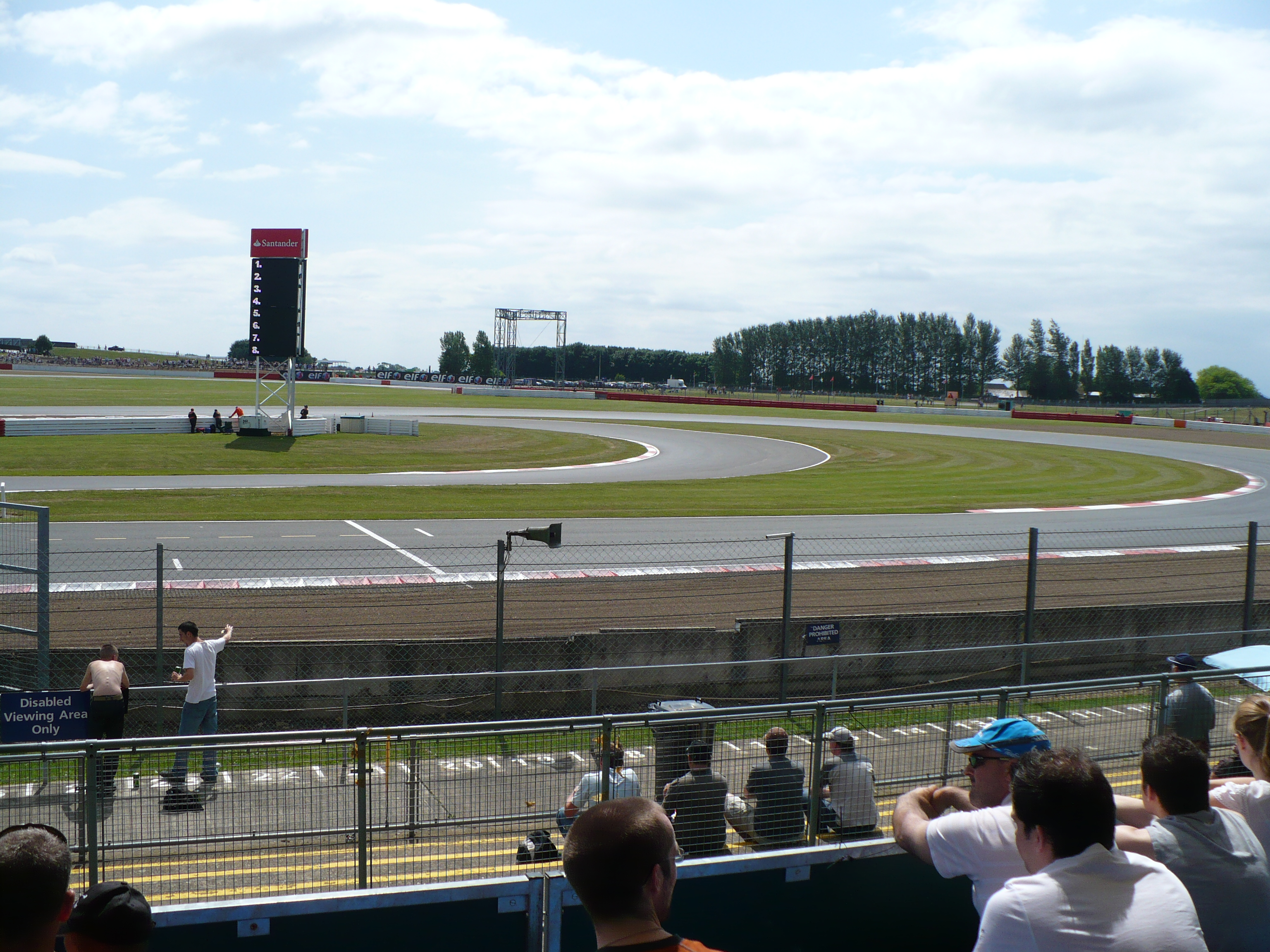
The Silverstone Circuit (pictured in 2009), where the British Grand Prix was held

The 2002 British Grand Prix was the 10th of 17 Formula One races in the 2002 Formula One World Championship, held on 7 July 2002, at the 5.141 km (3.194 mi) Silverstone Circuit in England, United Kingdom. This was the 53rd British Grand Prix in the Formula One World Championship, which began in 1950 at Silverstone. Before the race, Ferrari's Michael Schumacher led the World Drivers' Championship with 76 championship points, 46 ahead of Williams's Ralf Schumacher and 49 in more than Juan Pablo Montoya. Michael Schumacher's teammate Rubens Barrichello and McLaren's David Coulthard were joint fourth with 26 championship points each. Ferrari led the World Constructors' Championship with 102 championship points, 45 ahead of Williams. McLaren were third with 37 championship points, with Renault fourth with 14 championship points, and Sauber fifth with nine.

Following the European Grand Prix on 23 June, the teams tested on various European racing tracks to prepare for the British Grand Prix. Eight out of the eleven teams tested variously at the Circuit de Catalunya in Spain from 25 to 28 June. Coulthard was fastest on the first day. Renault's Jenson Button led on the second day, Coulthard's teammate Kimi Räikkönen lapped quickest on the third day. Alexander Wurz, McLaren's test driver, led on the final day. Ferrari also spent three days at the Monza Circuit in Italy with test driver Luciano Burti. The Italian team also spent four days at Italy's Mugello Circuit, joined by British American Racing (BAR) on the final two days. Ferrari test driver Luca Badoer spent the day at the Fiorano Circuit near Maranello. Toyota tested for three days with test driver Stéphane Sarrazin and race driver Allan McNish at France's Circuit Paul Ricard.

Michael Schumacher had won six of the nine races this season and talked about his chances in the British Grand Prix, "I am looking forward to Silverstone. We did very good tests there with Rubens. We learnt a lot and can feel well prepared for the British Grand Prix." Barrichello anticipated changing weather conditions, but also expected to be competitive at Silverstone and looking forward to the Grand Prix. Montoya had qualified on pole position in the previous three races, but had retired each time. He predicted his car's Michelin tyres would be a determinant factor at Silverstone, adding, "I really feel like making up for the last three disappointing races after as many brilliant qualifying sessions, but the British Grand Prix promises to be a tough one."

Eleven two-driver teams competed, each representing a different constructor, with no changes to the entry list from the previous race. There were four British drivers, four Germans, three Brazilians, two Finns, two Italians and one each from Australia, Canada, Colombia, France, Japan, Malaysia and Spain. Five drivers were making their British Grand Prix debuts and three drivers were previous British Grand Prix winners. Toyota's Mika Salo was restricted to one installation in the first free practice session because of food poisoning, missing the rest of Friday's running on doctor's orders. The Arrows team's participation in the event was jeopardised by debts owed to engine supplier Cosworth, legal action by former driver Jos Verstappen for being fired by the team, and investment bank Morgan Grenfell, who opposed possible investment by energy drinks brand Red Bull. The Fédération Internationale de l'Automobile (FIA; Formula One's regulatory body) allowed Arrows an extension to present their cars for scrutineering on Friday morning after missing Thursday afternoon's usual deadline, which they passed. The day before the race, Cosworth's managing directors and Arrows owner Tom Walkinshaw agreed payment for a supply of engines for the Grand Prix, allowing the team to compete.

During Friday free practice sessions, some teams experimented with a rear blue light to aid visibility in inclement weather. Drivers deemed the change ineffective. Jaguar presented the R3B, a highly updated version of the aerodynamically efficient R3, which was a total aerodynamic redesign. The car had redesigned front and rear wings, a new extractor profile, rear suspension and screens behind the front wheels. Williams adopted a new engine cover with a smaller section at the rear, allowing for a reduction in total dimensions at the FW24's rear, owing primarily to the BMW engine, which had less need to disperse heat than other engine brands. Renault debuted new bodywork at Silverstone while McLaren received a more powerful Mercedes-Benz engine.

== Practice ==
Two one-hour practices on Friday and two 45-minute sessions on Saturday preceded the race. The first practice session on Friday morning took place in cloudy and wet weather conditions. The rain eased, but the track remained wet, and the ambient and asphalt temperatures were cold before a torrential downpour in the final ten minutes. Teams had to adjust their racing setups in the damp weather.

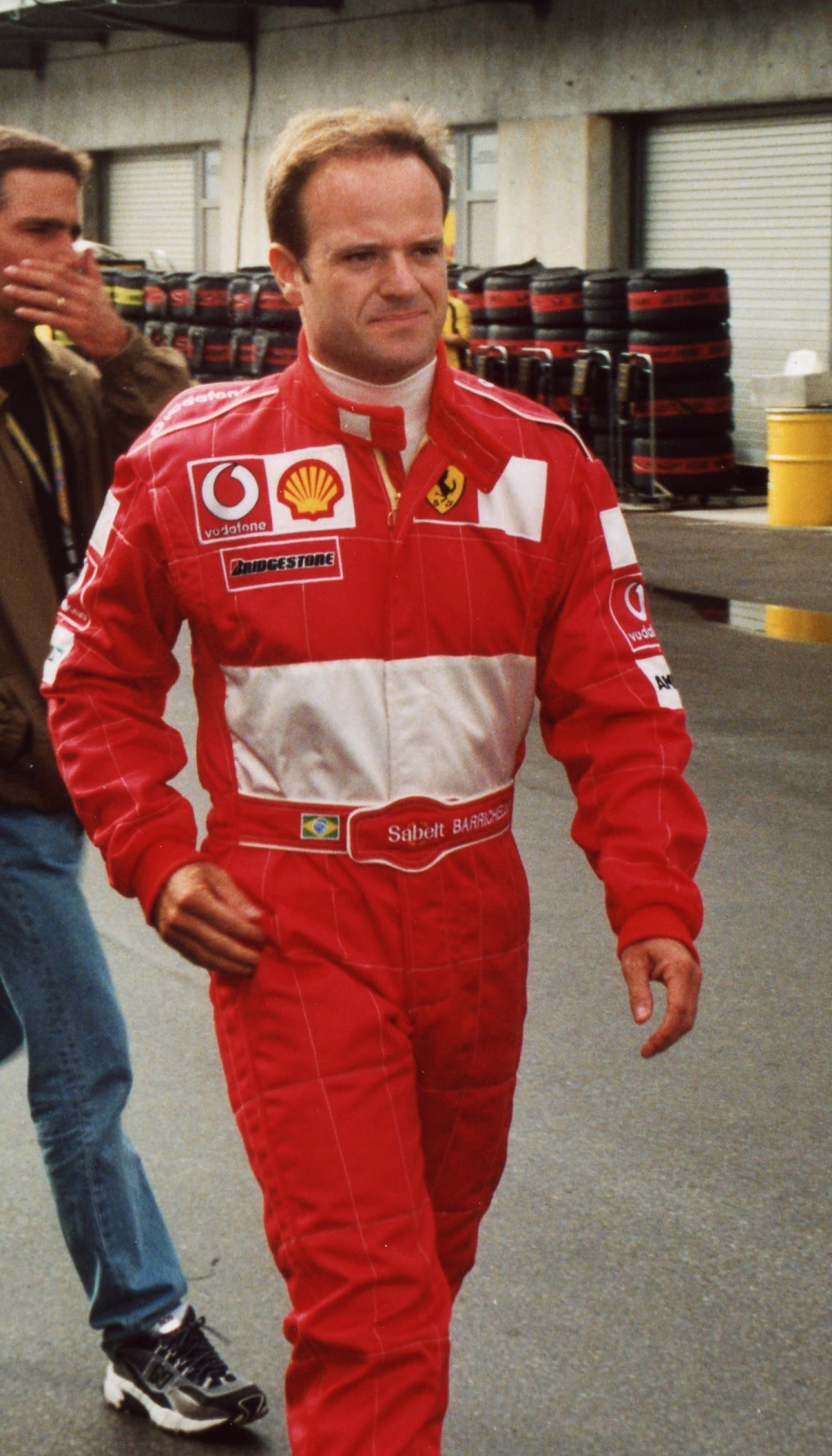
Rubens Barrichello (pictured in 2002) set the pace during the free practice sessions before the race.

Barrichello lapped fastest on intermediate tyres at 1:33.531, 1.213 seconds faster than Button. The McLaren duo of Coulthard and Räikkönen, Jaguar's Eddie Irvine and his teammate Pedro de la Rosa, Jordan's Giancarlo Fisichella, BAR's Jacques Villeneuve, Fisichella's teammate Takuma Sato and Sauber's Nick Heidfeld were in positions third through tenth. Michael Schumacher spun at the Abbey chicane's right-hand exit during his first out-lap. He avoided striking the barrier and stalled after the engine cut out, abandoning his car under the bridge and missing out on chassis setup for the rest of the session. Felipe Massa beached his Sauber car in the Abbey chicane gravel trap with 15 minutes left. Halfway through practice after six laps, Montoya's engine failed on the Hangar Straight and stopped at Vale turn, with smoke spewing from the right bank despite the fact that it was not under load.

By the second practice session later in the afternoon, the rain had subsided, but there was still standing water on the circuit. As a dry line appeared, lap times lowered and teams used intermediate rather than full wet tyres, but rain returned with more than ten minutes remaining. The rain subsided again at the session's conclusion. Barrichello set the day's fastest lap of 1:31.457, ahead of his teammate Michael Schumacher, Fisichella, Montoya, Sato, Villeneuve, Räikkönen, Massa, Button and Heidfeld in positions two to ten. The slippery surface caught out a number of drivers during the session. BAR's Olivier Panis spun at low speed and became stuck in the Brooklands corner gravel trap.

The third practice session, held on Saturday morning, was mostly dry and cold, and the Arrows team's first involvement of the weekend. Michael Schumacher set the early pace with his first quick lap, lapping at 1:20.750. His teammate Barrichello, Räikkönen, Arrows's Heinz-Harald Frentzen, Villeneuve, Sato, Frentzen's teammate Enrique Bernoldi, Renault's Jarno Trulli and his teammate Button completed the top ten. Early in the session, Fisichella stopped on track at Stowe corner with an engine issue. Panis stopped at Vale turn with electrical issues 20 minutes in. Irvine was the only driver not to set a lap time because of a gear selection fault.

The final practice session on Saturday morning also took place in dry weather. Barrichello set the pace with a 1:20.230 lap with five minutes left in the session. Michael Schumacher, Ralf Schumacher, Montoya, the McLaren duo of Coulthard and Räikkönen, Heidfeld, Button, Frentzen and Villeneuve rounded out the top ten. Ten minutes into the session, Arrows drivers Bernoldi and Frentzen stopped at the pit lane exit, pushing their cars into the pit lane for repairs. Panis again stopped at Vale turn with ten minutes to go and Mark Webber stopped his Minardi PS02 car at the exit to Copse corner with two minutes remaining.

== Qualifying ==
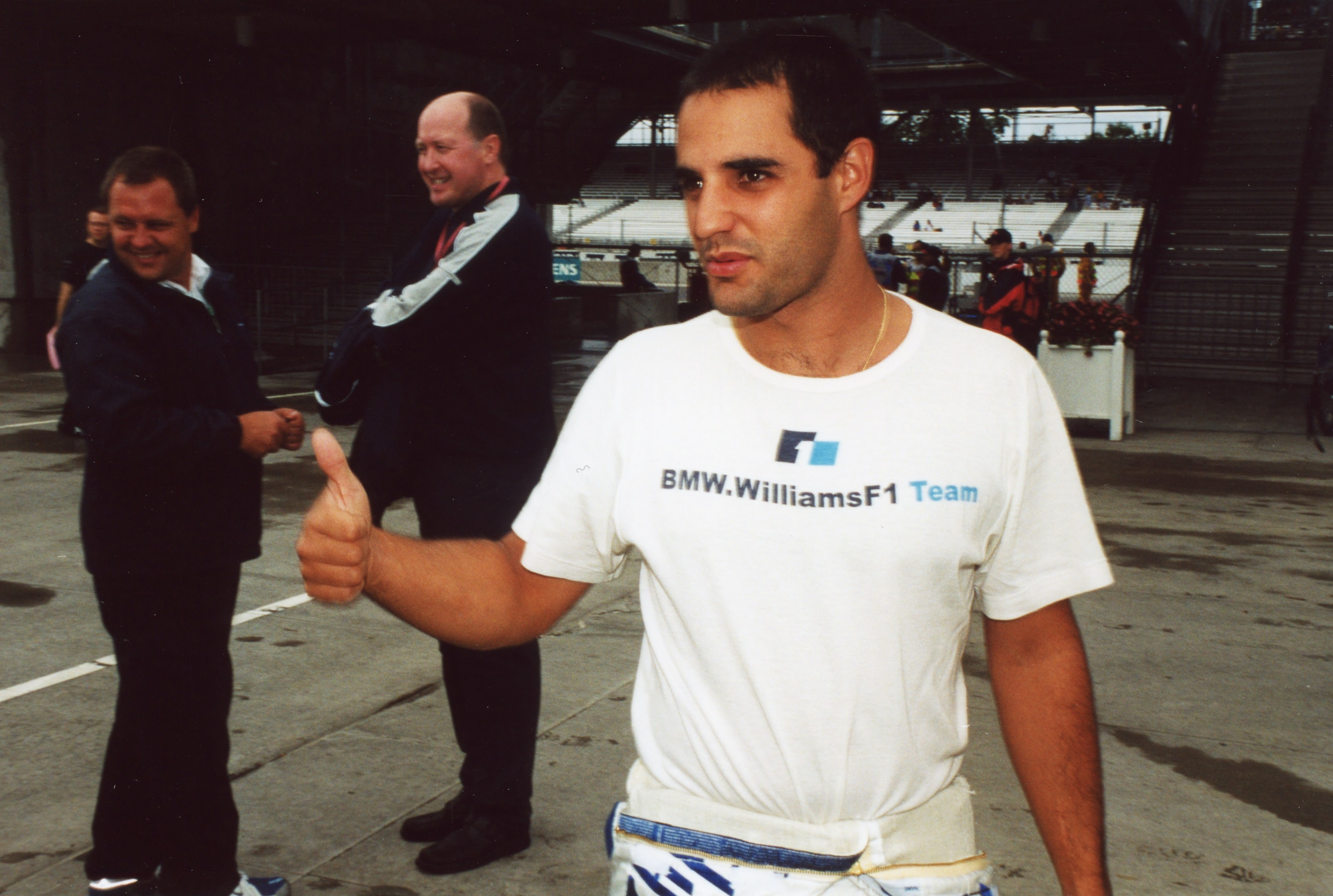
Juan Pablo Montoya secured his fourth consecutive pole position with the fastest lap time in the qualifying session.

Each driver was allowed twelve laps during Saturday's one-hour qualifying session, with starting positions determined by the drivers' quickest laps. During this session, the 107% rule was in effect, requiring each driver to remain within 107% of the quickest lap time in order to qualify for the race. It was dry, cloudy and cool throughout qualifying. Montoya claimed his fourth successive pole position of the season and the eighth of his career with a lap time of 1:18.998, the weekend's only lap sub-1:19, set on his final run in the session's final seconds. Following a change of rear wing, Barrichello was second, 0.034 seconds behind. He led early on, qualifying ahead of teammate Michael Schumacher for the third time in 2002. Barrichello lost time on his first run due to smoke from Button's engine failure at Becketts turn, and changed both wings for his second run. Michael Schumacher was third after taking nine of his twelve allocated laps. He installed new front and rear wings to better his Ferrari's balance. He made an error on his last run. Ralf Schumacher, fourth, made a late-session change that cost him his car's handling balance edge. McLaren occupied the grid's third row. Räikkönen, in fifth, lost engine power after a cylinder bank failed on his second run, forcing him to switch to the spare MP4-17 car for the rest of qualifying. His fastest time was set in the final seconds. Coulthard experienced excessive oversteer and twice baulked under braking; he was sixth after aborting his final run due to oversteer. Trulli, seventh, struggled with the racing setup but corrected a front-end issue for qualifying. Salo secured Toyota's season-best qualifying result with eighth, with Toyota resolving an issue with a flat battery. Villeneuve in ninth had a minor clutch issue during his third run and a gearbox downshift fault. Heidfeld was impeded by Montoya at Priory corner on his best lap and almost hit the rear of his car, leaving him in 10th.

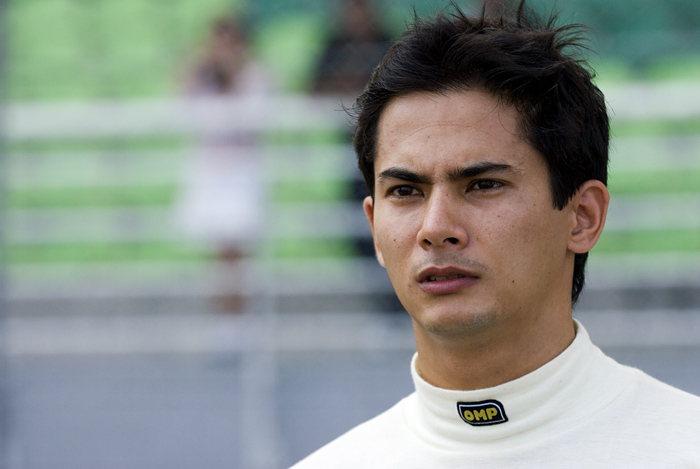
Alex Yoong (pictured in 2006) transgressed the 107% rule for the second time in the season and failed to qualify for the race.

Massa finished 11th after gradually reducing oversteer in his car during qualifying and losing time in traffic on the final run. On his first fast lap, Button's engine failed into Becketts corner, with smoke billowing from his car's rear. He returned to the pit lane and drove the spare Renault R202 lacking a more powerful qualifying engine and newest aerodynamic package, qualifying 12th. Panis finished 13th after replacing his engine during the interval. Sato needed a replacement front wing when it got loose during his second run. He took 14th due to a jittery car in high-speed corners and tyre graining. McNish took 15th after Räikkönen slowed him exiting the pit lane on his third run, costing him time. Frentzen (16th) encountered traffic on his final run but had none on the previous three. On his first run, Fisichella's engine cut out and stopped at Club turn. He drove the spare Jordan car for the rest of qualifying and was 17th. Bernoldi took 18th, citing improved handling balance on each of his runs. Irvine was the faster Jaguar driver in 19th. Webber qualified 20th despite a minor gearbox issue in his Minardi. On his first run, De la Rosa had a water leak that poured coolant over his race car's rear tyres. He then lost a lot of time in the pit lane while Jaguar sought to solve an electrical misfire. He drove the spare Jaguar setup for teammate Irvine, qualifying 21st within the 107% limit in the final minute. For the second time in 2002, Webber's teammate Alex Yoong did not lap within 107% of Montoya's pole time in his Minardi car by two-tenths of a second. This was attributed to him losing a lot of time in high-speed turns and potentially not having power steering. The stewards rejected Minardi's request for Yoong to enter the race, citing "no exceptional circumstances".

=== Qualifying classification ===
Pos	No	Driver	Constructor	Lap	Gap	Grid
1	6	(Colombia) Juan Pablo Montoya	Williams-BMW	1:18.998	—	1
2	2	(Brazil) Rubens Barrichello	Ferrari	1:19.032	+0.034	2
3	1	(Germany) Michael Schumacher	Ferrari	1:19.042	+0.044	3
4	5	(Germany) Ralf Schumacher	Williams-BMW	1:19.329	+0.331	4
5	4	(Finland) Kimi Räikkönen	McLaren-Mercedes	1:20.133	+1.135	5
6	3	(United Kingdom) David Coulthard	McLaren-Mercedes	1:20.315	+1.317	6
7	14	(Italy) Jarno Trulli	Renault	1:20.516	+1.518	7
8	24	(Finland) Mika Salo	Toyota	1:20.995	+1.997	8
9	11	(Canada) Jacques Villeneuve	BAR-Honda	1:21.130	+2.132	9
10	7	(Germany) Nick Heidfeld	Sauber-Petronas	1:21.187	+2.189	10
11	8	(Brazil) Felipe Massa	Sauber-Petronas	1:21.191	+2.193	11
12	15	(United Kingdom) Jenson Button	Renault	1:21.247	+2.249	12
13	12	(France) Olivier Panis	BAR-Honda	1:21.274	+2.276	13
14	10	(Japan) Takuma Sato	Jordan-Honda	1:21.337	+2.339	14
15	25	(United Kingdom) Allan McNish	Toyota	1:21.382	+2.384	15
16	20	(Germany) Heinz-Harald Frentzen	Arrows-Cosworth	1:21.416	+2.418	16
17	9	(Italy) Giancarlo Fisichella	Jordan-Honda	1:21.636	+2.638	17
18	21	(Brazil) Enrique Bernoldi	Arrows-Cosworth	1:21.780	+2.782	18
19	16	(United Kingdom) Eddie Irvine	Jaguar-Cosworth	1:21.851	+2.853	19
20	23	(Australia) Mark Webber	Minardi-Asiatech	1:22.281	+3.283	20
21	17	(Spain) Pedro de la Rosa	Jaguar-Cosworth	1:23.422	+4.424	21
107% time: 1:24.527
DNQ	22	(Malaysia) Alex Yoong	Minardi-Asiatech	1:24.785	+5.787	—

== Warm-up ==
On race morning, a half-hour warm-up session was held for teams to shake down their race and spare cars in dry, cold and overcast conditions. Barrichello lapped fastest at 1:22.371 in the session's final minute. His teammate Michael Schumacher, Räikkönen, Sato, Montoya, Heidfeld, Villeneuve, Massa, Coulthard and Trulli followed in the top ten. The rear of Coulthard's car began emitting white smoke going through Bridge corner and entered the pit lane with a loss in oil pressure. McLaren gave him the spare car, and he briefly returned to the track in the final minutes. Coulthard's engine was changed between warm-up and the race. Frentzen stopped at Copse corner with an electronic launch control glitch. Massa ran into the Priory corner gravel trap when warm-up ended.

== Race ==
The 60-lap race commenced at 13:00 British Summer Time. The total number of spectators was limited to 60,000 to demonstrate to the FIA that Silverstone's new access entry roads would be enough for the event. Weather conditions at the start were overcast and dry, although some rain had fallen between the warm-up and the race. The air and track temperatures were between 14 and 16 °C (57 and 61 °F); a 50% chance of rain was forecast. Panis switched to the spare BAR car after his race car stalled during a standing start at the pit lane exit. Barrichello attempted to select first gear starting the formation lap, but his Ferrari stalled on the dummy grid. Ferrari restarted his car with a replacement steering wheel but Barrichello was required to start at the rear of the grid.

Montoya retained the lead over Michael Schumacher heading into the first turn. Massa ran onto the grass when attempting to pass Villeneuve on the start/finish straight, spinning 360 degrees at the first turn, but regaining control of his car and continuing to drive. McNish was unable to begin due to a stall caused by a clutch failure and retired when Toyota mechanics were unable to resolve the issue and a push start in the pit lane proved unsuccessful. Button moved from 12th to seventh while Barrichello moved from 21st to 14th by the end of the first lap. Rain began falling at the southern part of the track after lap one as Montoya led Michael Schumacher, Ralf Schumacher, Räikkönen, Coulthard and Trulli. On lap two, Barrichello overtook Irvine for 13th. Räikkönen passed Ralf Schumacher into Copse corner for third on the following lap. Coulthard also tried unsuccessfully to pass Ralf Schumacher after Schumacher held him off. Barrichello passed Bernoldi for 12th, then battled Panis on the pit straight, passing him for 11th.

On lap five, Barrichello passed Heidfeld for ninth, while Fisichella dropped behind Frentzen and Webber to 18th. Michael Schumacher closed the gap on Montoya and began attacking him for the lead. Montoya was slow to exit Stowe corner, but he was able to hold off Michael Schumacher on the outside into Club turn by pushing him wide. Barrichello passed Villeneuve and Salo to move into eighth while lapping quicker than any other driver. As the rain became heavier and the track became more slippery, Salo spun out at turn one but rejoined the track thanks to the tarmac run-off area, dropping from eighth to eleventh on lap eight. The battle between Montoya and Michael Schumacher allowed Räikkönen to close up to the two leaders. On lap ten, Michael Schumacher was fast leaving Stowe corner but Montoya held him off. On that lap, Webber lost control of his car's rear and it snapped sideways while braking owing to a clutch fault. He spun off at Stowe corner at the end of the Hangar Straight and retired in the gravel trap.

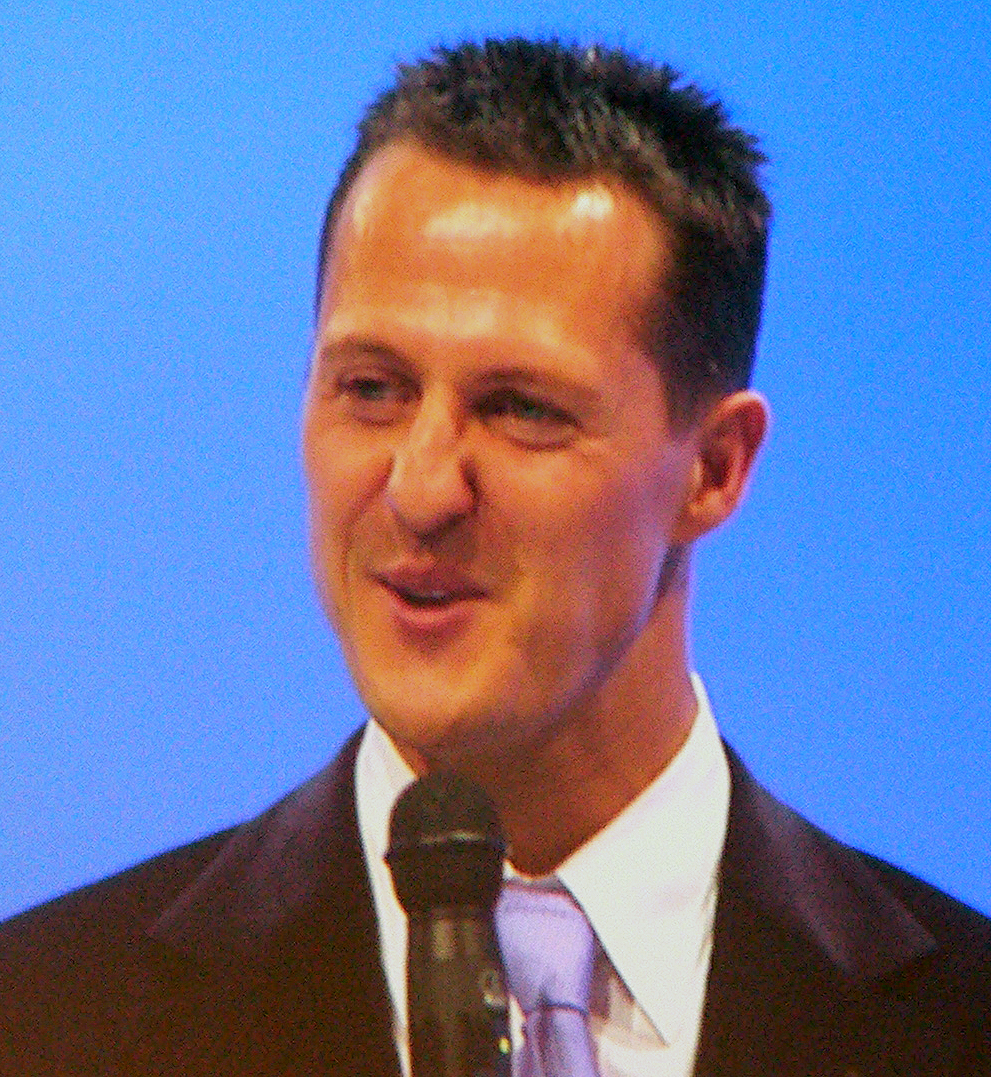
Michael Schumacher (pictured in 2007) took the lead from Montoya on lap 16 and held it for the rest of the race for his seventh win of the season.

On lap 11, Barrichello attempted but failed to pass Button at Abbey turn. He attempted to overtake Button again down the pit straight on the next lap but failed. The rain became heavier on the same lap and drivers lifted spray from the circuit. Montoya slipped on the damp track, but Michael Schumacher was too far away to take advantage. Drivers began making pit stops to change from dry to rain tyres at the end of lap 13. Bridgestone drivers used intermediate tyres while Michelin runners used full wet compounds. Räikkönen passed Michael Schumacher on the lap just as both drivers and Montoya entered the pit lane. McLaren were not prepared for Räikkönen due to radio interference from commentators for foreign digital television channels jamming their frequency. This moved Coulthard to the lead but drove slowly on the damp track because he was on dry tyres.

Montoya retook the lead from Coulthard on lap 14 and Michael Schumacher took second shortly after. Trulli moved into third as Coulthard entered the pit lane two laps later. On lap 16, Montoya's lead was erased because the Michelin full wet tyres performed worse on the wet track than the Bridgestone intermediates. This meant Michael Schumacher was three seconds a lap faster than Montoya, who lost cornering grip and ran wide at Abbey corner, allowing Schumacher past on the inside for the lead. Michael Schumacher began pulling away from Montoya. Barrichello overtook Trulli for third on the same lap. On lap 17, Salo pulled over onto the grass to retire with a drivetrain failure. Button lost fifth to Ralf Schumacher, then sixth to Räikkönen at Stowe turn on the same lap. Two laps later, Räikkönen overtook Ralf Schumacher for fifth on the inside into Bridge corner. Frentzen overcame Button's defence of seventh to pass him on the pit straight on that lap.

On lap 20, Barrichello moved in on Montoya and passed him for second at the exit of Luffield turn due to improved traction. Frentzen was pursuing Ralf Schumacher for sixth as both drivers were coming along the Hangar Straight, when his engine failed, pulling off onto the grass to retire. On lap 22, Räikkönen passed Trulli for fourth while Villeneuve overtook Button for seventh a lap later. By lap 23, the rain had subsided and the circuit was drying out. This prompted Coulthard to make an unexpected pit stop for dry tyres on lap 24, but McLaren was unprepared, and the refuelling equipment initially failed to connect. A similar situation happened to his teammate Räikkönen on lap 25. Irvine spun at the exit of Stowe turn on the same lap, going across the grass before removing the front wing hit the tyre barrier. Renault called their drivers into the pit lane for dry tyre changes on lap 26, with Trulli being serviced first and Button second. Massa overtook Bernoldi for sixth on the next lap.

Heavy rain returned to the circuit on lap 28. On lap 29, Coulthard struggled with grip and skidded onto the grass at Bridge Corner, as Ralf Schumacher attempted to lap him without delaying him. He hit a polysterene marker board and spun towards the track's centre. Bernoldi pulled off the circuit on lap 31 due to a drivetrain failure, forcing him to retire. On the next lap, Trulli retired on the grass with an electrical fault causing his gearbox to independently downshift and affect his traction control system. Barrichello spun through 360 degrees at Abbey corner after mounting the damp kerbing. He remained second due to his significant lead behind Montoya. Ralf Schumacher made his second pit stop on lap 32, however the refuelling system failed and the nozzle valve did not open, resulting in no fuel entering his car. He fell from fourth to eighth. On laps 33 and 34, both Ferrari drivers made their second fuel and tyre pit stop, remaining first and second.

Villeneuve was fourth at this time, and Panis was sixth, thanks to BAR team principal David Richards' personal helicopter stationed in the air. Richards asked the pilot to send him the weather forecast at regular intervals, advising BAR on when to make pit stops. Williams brought Ralf Schumacher into the pit lane for fuel and dry tyres on lap 37, dropping from ninth to tenth. Panis closed in on Heidfeld in fifth and began duelling for the place. Coulthard made his fourth pit stop on lap 39. Flames were seen at his McLaren's rear and the team struggled with the refuelling rig. He then ran wide onto the grass and tarmac surface at Vale corner. Montoya gained on Barrichello and was 1.9 seconds behind by the time both drivers made pit stops on lap 40, around the same lap when the circuit began drying. Barrichello maintained second place over Montoya with a 6.4-second fuel stop. On lap 41, Montoya on cold tyres had a run on Barrichello at the exit of Bridge corner and overtook him on the inside for second into Priory turn. Barrichello immediately attempted to reclaim second but Montoya defended it.

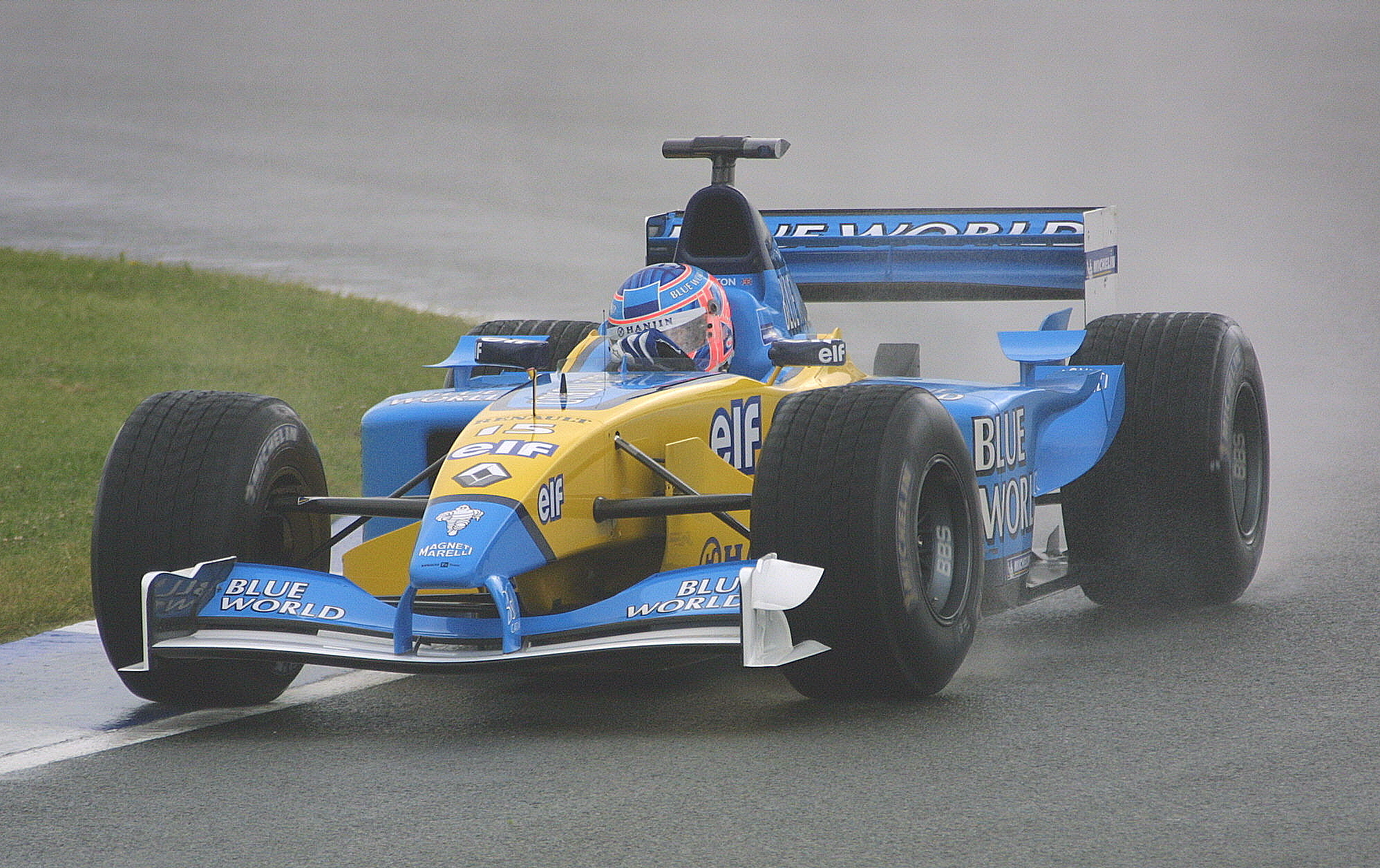
Jenson Button eventually retired with a loose front-left wheel.

At the end of lap 43, Michael Schumacher made his third pit stop from the lead for new tyres and fuel. Four laps later, Räikkönen retired when his engine failed at the exit of Club turn. Once Barrichello's tyres reached their optimum temperature, he challenged Montoya on the start/finish straight and passed him on the inside for second entering the right-hand Copse corner on lap 47, as Montoya glanced Barrichello's left-rear wheel. Williams instructed Montoya to reduce the revolutions per minute because of apparent engine issues. On lap 53, Sato drove onto the grass at the exit of Copse Corner, smoke billowing from his car's back due to an engine failure. Four laps later, Button carefully entered the pit lane to retire after realising the front-left wheel was shifting and potentially detaching from his car.

Michael Schumacher led for the remainder of the race, taking his seventh victory in ten races in the season and 60th of his career. His teammate Barrichello finished second, 14.578 seconds behind, through a tyre strategy devised by Ferrari technical director Ross Brawn. Barrichello was followed by Montoya in third. BAR scored their first championship points of the season after their two drivers ran reliably, while the rain neutralised McLaren and Renault's pace advantage. Villeneuve finished fourth with Panis taking fifth. Heidfeld was the final point-scorer in sixth, despite racing on tyres he felt were below temperature, causing him to understeer and have poor traction entering and leaving turns. Fisichella finished seventh, battling Heidfeld in the last laps despite a nervous car. Ralf Schumacher finished eighth, ahead of Massa in ninth, after the latter spun several times during the race. Coulthard's pace improved as the track dried, but he was 10th. De la Rosa was the last driver to cross the finish line in 11th, hampered by the rain. In total, 11 of the 21 qualifiers finished the race.

=== Post-race ===
The top three drivers appeared on the podium to collect their trophies and spoke to the media in the subsequent press conference. Michael Schumacher said the spectators "haven't had many occasions to enjoy victories with me in my time at Silverstone" considering his lack of British Grand Prix success but described it as "a very special race today for the circumstances". He also lauded his Ferrari and attributed his victory to the tyres' performance and Brawn's strategy when the rain began falling. Barrichello called his second-place finish "a fantastic race in terms of a result because I couldn't wish for more" but thought he pushed too hard on the intermediate tyres. Montoya stated that the slick tyres appeared to work well on a damp track, and he was faster than Michael Schumacher until it dried up. Nevertheless, he said of finishing third, "it's good I got on the podium again. Yesterday's qualifying was a bit of a surprise for everybody including myself, I didn't really mind actually, but, you know, I couldn't hope for anything more."

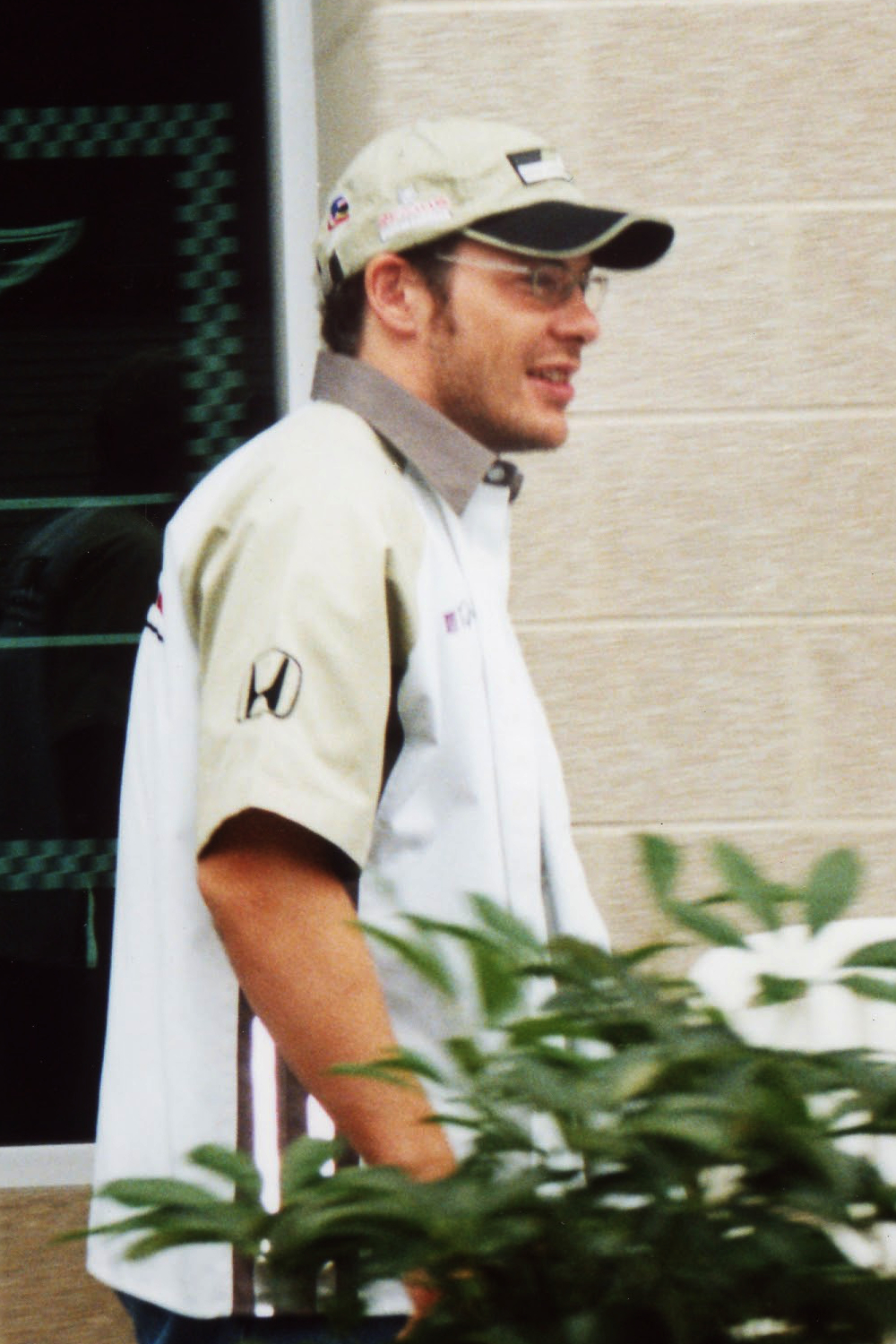
Jacques Villeneuve contributed to British American Racing's first championship points score of the season.

Villeneuve expressed his satisfaction with his team's effort and fourth-place finish, "It was important for the team. To get two cars in the points was great. This weekend we were finally competitive. For the first race this season we were confident that we didn't need luck to be in the points. Everybody at the team needed this." Richards attributed the BAR team's performance to perseverance, "If you keep plugging away and do your job well, it will come right." Heidfeld stated that he was pleased to earn a championship point for finishing sixth, but that his first set of grooved tyres did not reach full temperature in the first laps, despite the fact that his understeer and braking issues improved when he ran on intermediate tyres when the track was wet. Coulthard said that it had been "a terrible Grand Prix for us. It was a screw up from start to finish, and whatever could go wrong, did go wrong." He added he preferred to forget the race, "I just want to forget this year. It's been so disappointing."

Michelin boss Pierre Dupasquier defended the company's tyres after drivers criticised their performance in comparison to Bridgestone's during the race, citing the "Ferrari phenomenon," which claimed Ferrari lapped three to four seconds faster than any other car on the wet track. An engineer from a Michelin-shod team accused Dupasquier of "deluding himself," while its technical director Pascal Vasselon confirmed the company did not offer the appropriate tyre for the weather. In a newspaper column the day after the race, McNish voiced his dissatisfaction with his clutch failing at the start, "from my personal view, this weekend has been a big disappointment" and was just as a disappointment to him as the season-opening Australian Grand Prix. He added it was a different problem to the one that stopped him at the San Marino Grand Prix earlier in the season.

The result meant Michael Schumacher increased his lead in the World Drivers' Championship to 54 championship points. His teammate Barrichello's second-place result moved him from equal fourth to second while Montoya remained third. Ralf Schumacher's failure to score championship points dropped him from second to fourth. Ferrari further extended their World Constructors' Championship lead to 57 championship points over Williams. McLaren maintained third, with both Renault and Sauber still in fourth and fifth with seven rounds remaining in the season. Despite the fact that both titles were within reach, Brawn stated that while Ferrari may win the Drivers' Championship in the French Grand Prix, their primary focus was on winning races.

=== Race classification ===
Drivers who scored championship points are denoted in bold.

Pos	No	Driver	Constructor	Tyre	Laps	Time/Retired	Grid	Points
1	1	(Germany) **Michael Schumacher**	**Ferrari**	B	60	1:31:45.015	3	10
2	2	(Brazil) **Rubens Barrichello**	**Ferrari**	B	60	+14.578	2^{1}	6
3	6	(Colombia) **Juan Pablo Montoya**	**Williams-BMW**	M	60	+31.661	1	4
4	11	(Canada) **Jacques Villeneuve**	**BAR-Honda**	B	59	+1 Lap	9	3
5	12	(France) **Olivier Panis**	**BAR-Honda**	B	59	+1 Lap	13	2
6	7	(Germany) **Nick Heidfeld**	**Sauber-Petronas**	B	59	+1 Lap	10	1
7	9	(Italy) Giancarlo Fisichella	Jordan-Honda	B	59	+1 Lap	17	
8	5	(Germany) Ralf Schumacher	Williams-BMW	M	59	+1 Lap	4	
9	8	(Brazil) Felipe Massa	Sauber-Petronas	B	59	+1 Lap	11	
10	3	(United Kingdom) David Coulthard	McLaren-Mercedes	M	58	+2 Laps	6	
11	17	(Spain) Pedro de la Rosa	Jaguar-Cosworth	M	58	+2 Laps	21	
12	15	(United Kingdom) Jenson Button	Renault	M	54	Suspension	12	
Ret	10	(Japan) Takuma Sato	Jordan-Honda	B	50	Engine	14	
Ret	4	(Finland) Kimi Räikkönen	McLaren-Mercedes	M	44	Engine	5	
Ret	14	(Italy) Jarno Trulli	Renault	M	29	Electrical	7	
Ret	21	(Brazil) Enrique Bernoldi	Arrows-Cosworth	B	28	Driveshaft	18	
Ret	16	(United Kingdom) Eddie Irvine	Jaguar-Cosworth	M	23	Spin	19	
Ret	20	(Germany) Heinz-Harald Frentzen	Arrows-Cosworth	B	20	Engine	16	
Ret	24	(Finland) Mika Salo	Toyota	M	15	Drivetrain	8	
Ret	23	(Australia) Mark Webber	Minardi-Asiatech	M	9	Clutch	20	
Ret	25	(United Kingdom) Allan McNish	Toyota	M	0	Clutch	15	
DNQ	22	(Malaysia) Alex Yoong	Minardi-Asiatech	M	—	Broke 107% Rule	—	

Notes

- **^1** – Rubens Barrichello started the race from the back of the grid after stalling on the formation lap.

== Championship standings after the race ==
Drivers' Championship standings

+/–	Pos	Driver	Points
	1	(Germany) Michael Schumacher	86
2	2	(Brazil) Rubens Barrichello	32
	3	(Colombia) Juan Pablo Montoya	31
2	4	(Germany) Ralf Schumacher	30
	5	(United Kingdom) David Coulthard	26

Constructors' Championship standings

+/–	Pos	Constructor	Points
	1	(Italy) Ferrari	118
	2	(United Kingdom) Williams-BMW	61
	3	(United Kingdom) McLaren-Mercedes	37
	4	(France) Renault	14
	5	(Switzerland) Sauber-Petronas	10
Sources:

- Note: Only the top five positions are included for both sets of standings.

Previous race: 2002 European Grand Prix	FIA Formula One World Championship; 2002 season	Next race: 2002 French Grand Prix
Previous race: 2001 British Grand Prix	British Grand Prix	Next race: 2003 British Grand Prix
