= 2002 European Grand Prix =

Formula One motor race

Race 9 of 17 in the 2002 Formula One World Championship
| ← Previous race | Next race → |
- The Nürburgring

Race details
- Date: 23 June 2002
- Official name: 2002 Allianz Grand Prix of Europe
- Location: Nürburgring, Nürburg, Rhineland-Palatinate, Germany
- Course: Permanent racing facility
- Course length: 5.148 km (3.2 miles)
- Distance: 60 laps, 308.88 km (192 miles)
- Weather: Mainly Fine, Air Temp: 18°C

Pole position
| Driver | (Colombia) Juan Pablo Montoya | Williams-BMW |
- Time: 1:29.906

Fastest lap
| Driver | (Germany) Michael Schumacher | Ferrari |
- Time: 1:32.226 on lap 26

Podium
| First | (Brazil) Rubens Barrichello | Ferrari |
| Second | (Germany) Michael Schumacher | Ferrari |
| Third | (Finland) Kimi Räikkönen | McLaren-Mercedes |

The 2002 European Grand Prix (formally the 2002 Allianz Grand Prix of Europe) was a Formula One motor race held before 150,000 spectators on 23 June 2002 at the Nürburgring, Nürburg, Rhineland-Palatinate, Germany. It was the ninth of 17 rounds in the 2002 Formula One World Championship and the seventh European Grand Prix at the Nürburgring. Ferrari driver Rubens Barrichello won the 60-lap race after starting from fourth position. His teammate Michael Schumacher finished in second and McLaren's Kimi Räikkönen took third.

Going into the event, Michael Schumacher led the World Drivers' Championship from the Williams pair of Juan Pablo Montoya and Ralf Schumacher and Ferrari led Williams in the World Constructors' Championship. This was the first race on the newly rebuilt Nürburgring layout, which was extended to provide for more passing possibilities. Montoya took his third consecutive pole position by setting the fastest lap time in the one-hour qualifying session. At the start, he lost the race lead to teammate Ralf Schumacher, who kept it until Barrichello passed him midway through the first lap. Barrichello led throughout the race, winning his first race since the 2000 German Grand Prix and second of his career. His teammate Michael Schumacher ran close behind in the closing laps and was 0.294 seconds adrift in second.

The result promoted Barrichello from fifth to fourth in the World Drivers' Championship but was tied with David Coulthard on championship points. Michael Schumacher strengthened his championship lead to 46 championship points over Ralf Schumacher, with Montoya trailing three championship points behind his teammate. Ferrari's one-two finish allowed them to draw further ahead of Williams in the World Constructors' Championship and McLaren maintained third position. Renault in fourth extended their points advantage over the fifth-placed Sauber with eight races remaining in the season.

== Background ==
The 2002 European Grand Prix was the ninth of seventeen Formula One races in the 2002 Formula One World Championship, held on 23 June 2002, at the 5.148 km (3.199 mi) clockwise Nürburgring, Nürburg, Rhineland-Palatinate, Germany, which hosted the European Grand Prix for the seventh time since the circuit was re-opened in 1984. It was one of two Grands Prix staged in Germany, preceding the German Grand Prix by a month.

Going into the race, Ferrari driver Michael Schumacher led the World Drivers' Championship with 70 championship points, followed by Williams teammates Ralf Schumacher and Juan Pablo Montoya who were tied for second on 27 championship points. David Coulthard of McLaren was fourth with 26 championship points, and Rubens Barrichello was fifth with 16 championship points. Ferrari led the World Constructors' Championship with 86 championship points, ahead of Williams in second with 54 championship points. McLaren were third with 33 championship points, while Renault (12) and Sauber (eight) contested fourth.

Following the Canadian Grand Prix on 9 June, the majority of teams tested racing setups, car and electrical components and tyres at several European racing courses to prepare for the European Grand Prix. Eight teams ran variously for three days at the Circuito de Jerez in Spain. Alexander Wurz, McLaren's test driver, was fastest on the first day. McLaren's regular driver Kimi Räikkönen led the second and third days, and his teammate Coulthard paced the fourth and final day. Ferrari test driver Luca Badoer tested the F2002's car setup and Bridgestone tyres at Italy's Mugello Circuit before being relieved by Michael Schumacher for three days of component testing. They were joined by Sauber drivers Nick Heidfeld and Felipe Massa for three days of aerodynamics and mechanical testing. Jordan spent two days testing at Britain's Elvington Airfield, conducting aerodynamic work to collect track correlation of wind tunnel development with Formula Renault champion Marcel Lasée. Arrows conducted aerodynamic straightline tests at the RAF Kemble aerodrome near the team's Leafield headquarters while prepping their cars for the race. Minardi were the only team not to test, instead preparing their cars at their Faenza factory.

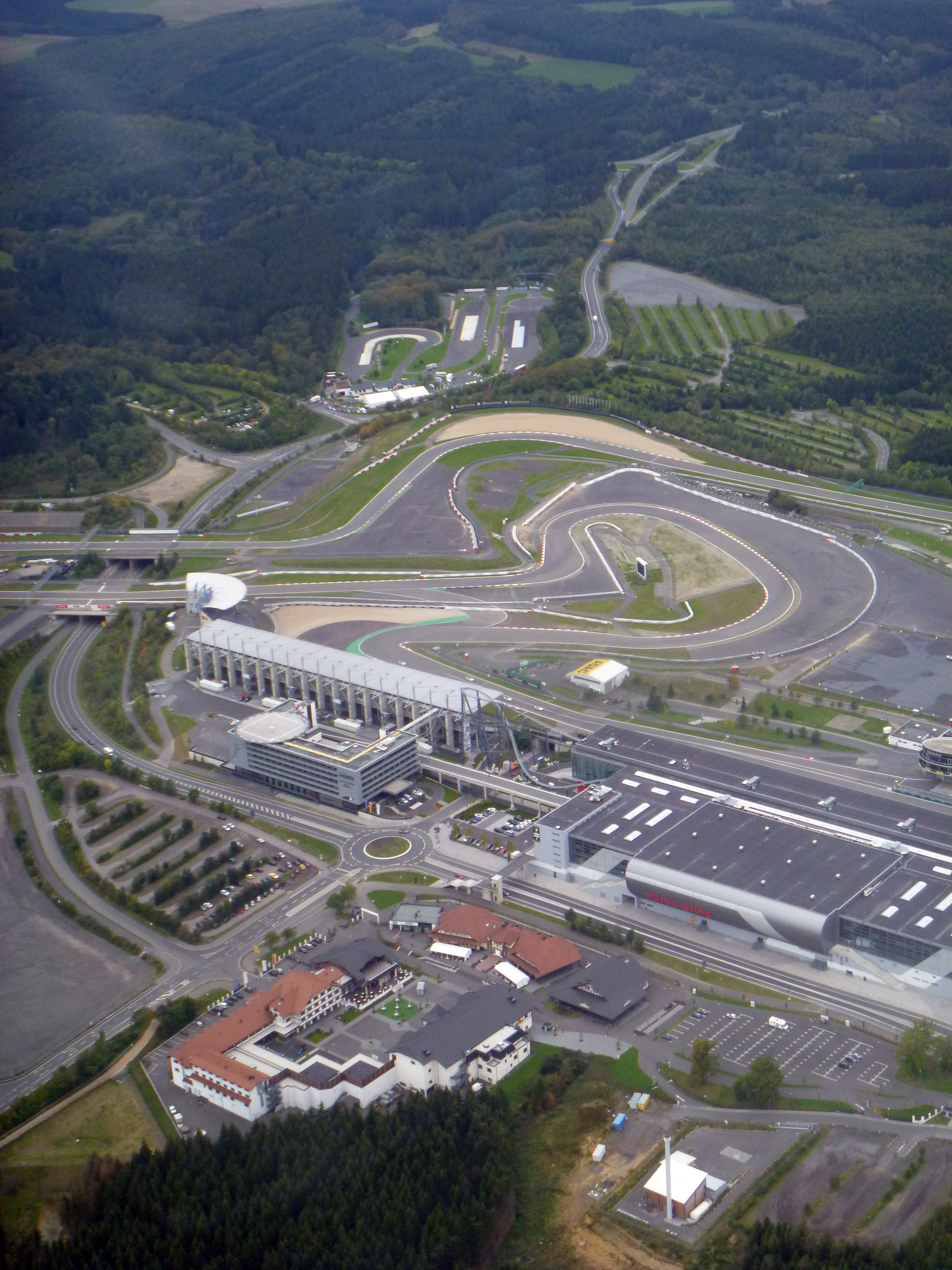
The Mercedes Arena corners (pictured in 2011) were created to increase the chance of overtaking.

Michael Schumacher had won the Canadian Grand Prix two weeks previously, his sixth of the season, and wanted to focus on the potential threat from Williams and McLaren in the European Grand Prix. He felt Ferrari could be confident and competitive at the Nürburgring, and that tyres would be an important aspect. Montoya claimed he had recovered from his disappointment in the Canadian Grand Prix, where he retired due to an engine problem, and that he hoped to improve on his podium performance in the previous year's European Grand Prix. He also said that Williams had addressed his engine problems. Räikkönen was looking forward to competing at the Nürburgring, the home race of McLaren's engine supplier Mercedes-Benz, and hoped to score a good finish for the German fans.

Following the previous race at the Nürburgring, the circuit's layout was altered, the first major change since its reopening in 1984. The chicane that previously formed the first corner was replaced by a sharp right-hand hairpin with tight left and right-hand turns, with the improvements intended to increase the number of overtakes. The asphalt was widened by 25 m (82 ft) to facilitate overtakes. The changes increased the circuit's length by 645 yards (590 metres) and the number of laps run was reduced from 67 to 60. Journalist Boris Muradov wrote the changes had made the circuit "even more twisty and narrow, requiring increased traction and, therefore, more downforce." Jaguar team principal and former World Champion Niki Lauda believed the revised layout would provide a better view for spectators in the grandstands.

The new section garnered mixed opinions from drivers and critics, and it was the main discussion topic heading into the race. Ralf Schumacher described it as "a nice part of the circuit," although he struggled to identify the optimal braking spot and predicted that passing would be tough. Jordan's Takuma Sato noted although the surface was bumpy upon entry he felt being unsighted in the first corner would be "a good feeling". Räikkönen speculated that the changes would provide for more overtakes. Bild columnist and retired driver Hans-Joachim Stuck described it as "sexiest the new corner" on the revised layout and that it was made for aggressive drivers. Coulthard was more vocal in his criticism saying the bumpiness of the section was "ridiculous" and preferred the challenge of the former first corner chicane. Montoya felt the section was "too slow" for himself, and British American Racing (BAR) driver Jacques Villeneuve said it did not provide a decent rhythm.

There were eleven teams (each representing a different constructor) with two drivers each for the Grand Prix, with no changes from the season entry list. Some teams modified their cars ahead of the race. Ferrari brought new electronic bi-directional telemetry and steering wheels and Michael Schumacher evaluated a new engine cover which was not used in Sunday's race. Renault unveiled a new aerodynamic package, including a redesigned extractor profile and a new traction control system, purportedly targeted at improving the R202's performance exiting slow-speed corners. McLaren unveiled a new aerodynamic package. For the race, Honda introduced a more powerful, updated V10 engine specification while Jordan made modest changes to their front wings. Sauber reverted to a front wing featuring inverted V supports.

== Practice ==
Preceding the race were two one-hour practice sessions on Friday and two 45-minute sessions on Saturday. The FIA scheduled the Saturday morning practice and afternoon qualifying sessions 45 minutes earlier than usual, at 09:00 CEST (UTC+2), 10:15 and 14:00 to accommodate the 2002 FIFA World Cup's last two quarter-final matches, which were held on the same day in Japan and South Korea.

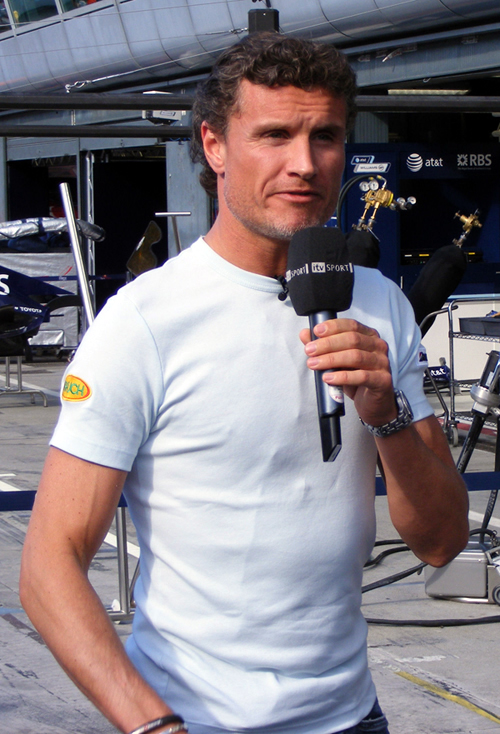
David Coulthard (pictured in 2007) set the fastest lap time in the Friday practice sessions.

The first practice session on Friday morning was gloomy and dry, with a brief rain shower just after halfway through, but not heavy enough to disrupt proceedings. Barrichello set the quickest time of 1:33.665, one-tenth of a second faster than Ferrari teammate Michael Schumacher. Heidfeld was third-fastest, ahead of Toyota's Allan McNish, Massa. Coulthard, Frentzen, Jordan's Giancarlo Fisichella, Toyota's Mika Salo and Montoya. Several drivers locked up entering the turn one hairpin and ran wide. Enrique Bernoldi lost the rear-end of his Arrows car through the Ford Kurve on 36 minutes and its right side made light contact with a tyre barrier; this required a yellow-flag to be shown as marshals were needed to remove Bernoldi's car from the track.

In the second practice session, held later in the afternoon in cool and overcast conditions, Despite running into the Dunlop Kurve gravel trap, Coulthard was fastest with a 1:31.886 lap; his teammate Räikkönen was third. The Ferrari drivers second and fourth; Michael Schumacher ahead of Barrichello. They were followed by the Williams pair of Montoya (who complained of understeer) and Ralf Schumacher. Jarno Trulli and Jenson Button were seventh and eighth for Renault with Salo and Panis ninth and tenth. During the session, eight drivers left the course and ended up in gravel traps. Minardi's Mark Webber ran into the Dunlop Kurve gravel trap with a right-rear suspension member failure. His teammate Alex Yoong's session was cut short after 42 minutes due to an engine failure.

It remained warm and overcast for the Saturday morning practice sessions, in which teams prepared for either qualifying or the race. Michael Schumacher set the third session's fastest time of 1:30.658 ten minutes before the end, despite losing control of his Ferrari's rear-end after clipping a kerb at the Veedol-S chicane earlier in his first attempt at a fast lap. His teammate Barrichello was second-fastest. The Williams pair of Ralf Schmacher and Montoya, Heidfeld, Massa, Button, Coulthard and Trulli followed in the top ten. Massa ran wide in the revised stadium section and Villeneuve spun at the right-hand Bit-Kehre corner.

In the final practice session, Michael Schumacher was unable to improve his lap time but remained fastest; Barrichello was third, ahead of Heidfeld, Ralf Schumacher, Salo, Coulthard, Montoya, Trulli and Button in positions four through ten. Pedro de la Rosa had a hydraulic leak and fire in his Arrows car and stopped at the side of the circuit which prevented him from setting a lap time. Yoong ran over the kerbing at the last chicane during the final ten minutes but returned to the pit lane. Button ran into the gravel at the Dunlop Kurve hairpin but extricated himself back to the track.

== Qualifying ==
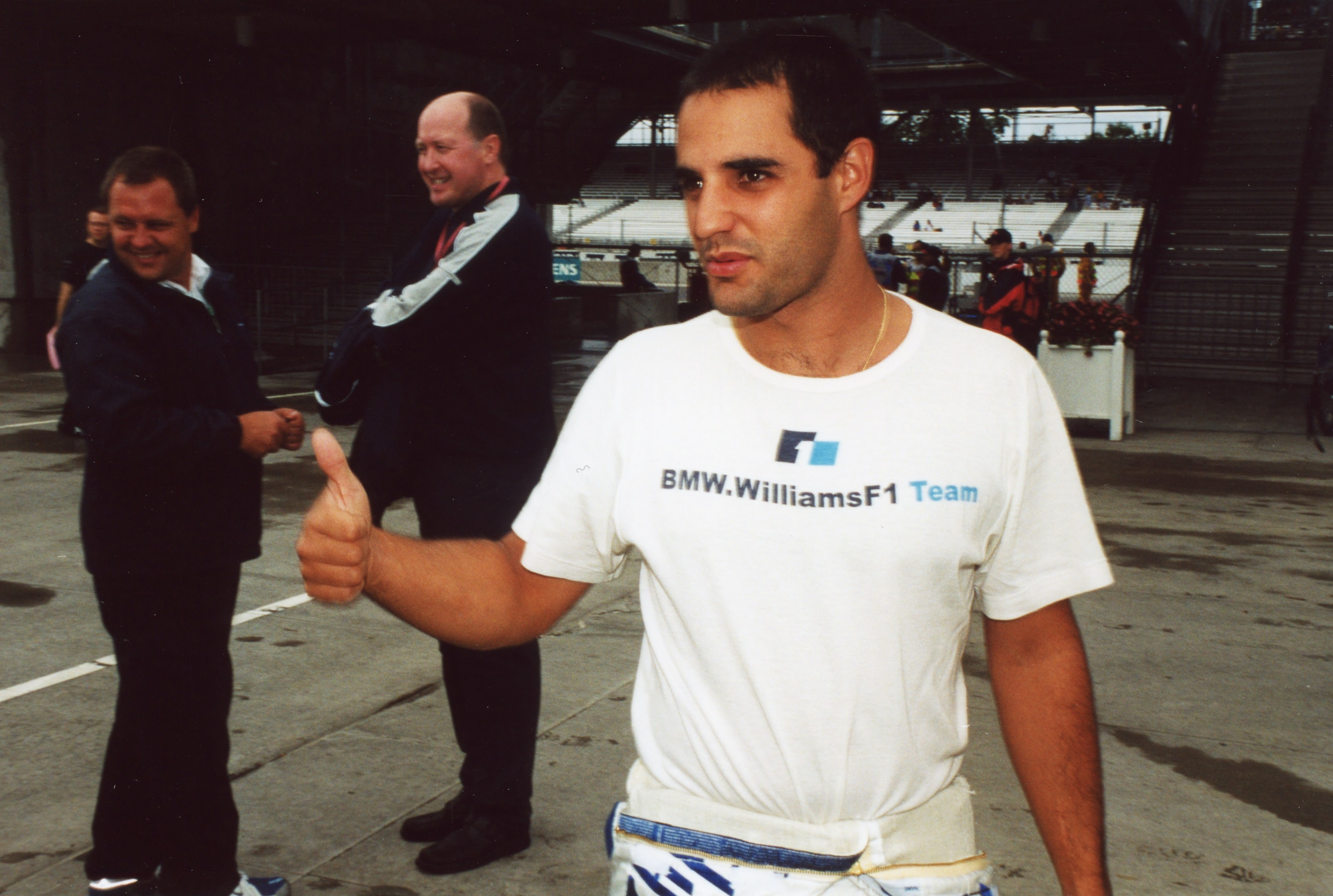
Juan Pablo Montoya took the seventh pole position of his career.

Each driver was allowed twelve laps during Saturday's one-hour qualifying session, with starting positions determined by the drivers' quickest laps. During this session, the 107% rule was in effect, requiring each driver to remain within 107% of the quickest lap time in order to qualify for the race. Qualifying took place on a dry track in overcast weather. Montoya improved on each of his opening three timed runs. He achieved his third consecutive pole position and the seventh of his career with a time of 1:29.906, which set 13 minutes before qualifying ended. He was pleased to take pole despite having set an aim of the second row, and went wide at turn three during his final run. Ralf Schumacher was 0.009 seconds slower than Montoya in second and held pole until his teammate's quickest lap. He restricted himself to three timed runs to save a fresh new pair of Michelin tyres for the race, and did not change his racing setup. Michael Schumacher took third, but his race car got stuck in gear on his first out lap, so he transferred to the spare Ferrari for the rest of qualifying since his mechanics could not fix the gearbox issue. He made two minor mistakes at the final two corners of the course on his penultimate run after pushing hard, preventing him from improving his lap toward the end of qualifying, and stopped him from potentially securing pole position. Barrichello improved his car's balance throughout qualifying and secured fourth. Coulthard, fifth, changed his set-up to run faster in the middle section which compromised performance in the first sector. Räikkönen dropped a wheel on turn 13 kerbs, leaving him sixth. The two Renault drivers had the grid's fourth row with Trulli ahead of Button; Trulli was behind Button early on before bettering his teammate, who was set to achieve a season-best qualifying result. Trulli was pleased with his starting position, but Button suffered understeer from his second qualifying lap and made a slight tweak to his rear anti-roll-bar in an attempt to go faster, but was slowed by slower traffic.

Heidfeld, ninth, felt vibrations after flat-spotting his front-right tyre on his first run. Salo finished 10th, stating that his car handled best on his first run but deteriorated afterwards. Massa improved his car's balance, but he had excess oversteer through turns two and four, taking 11th. Panis was the highest-placed Honda-powered driver in 12th. He was ahead of McNish in the slower Toyota, which had intermittent technical issues. Sato, driving the faster Jordan, was 14th and was upset with his performance due to excessive oversteer during qualifying. He was followed by Frentzen who had understeer resulting in time loss in the first sector. De la Rosa drove the spare Jaguar for two laps and did two further laps in his repaired race car; he said his race car felt better balanced but was delayed on his final run, leaving him in 16th. Irvine stated that he experienced understeer during qualifying and struggled to accelerate out of corners due to a lack of power and aerodynamic issues; these issues meant he could only take 17th. He was in front of Fisichella in the slower Jordan car, who made adjustments to eliminate understeer. Villeneuve was 19th after failing to locate an suitable car setup and his car got slower. The two Minardi drivers qualified in 20th and 22nd with Webber quicker than Yoong; they were separated by Bernoldi who had vehicluar balance problems.

=== Qualifying classification ===
| Pos | No | Driver | Constructor | Lap | Gap | Grid |
|---|---|---|---|---|---|---|
| 1 | 6 | (Colombia) Juan Pablo Montoya | Williams-BMW | 1:29.906 | — | 1 |
| 2 | 5 | (Germany) Ralf Schumacher | Williams-BMW | 1:29.915 | +0.009 | 2 |
| 3 | 1 | (Germany) Michael Schumacher | Ferrari | 1:30.035 | +0.129 | 3 |
| 4 | 2 | (Brazil) Rubens Barrichello | Ferrari | 1:30.387 | +0.481 | 4 |
| 5 | 3 | (United Kingdom) David Coulthard | McLaren-Mercedes | 1:30.550 | +0.644 | 5 |
| 6 | 4 | (Finland) Kimi Räikkönen | McLaren-Mercedes | 1:30.591 | +0.685 | 6 |
| 7 | 14 | (Italy) Jarno Trulli | Renault | 1:30.927 | +1.021 | 7 |
| 8 | 15 | (United Kingdom) Jenson Button | Renault | 1:31.136 | +1.230 | 8 |
| 9 | 7 | (Germany) Nick Heidfeld | Sauber-Petronas | 1:31.211 | +1.305 | 9 |
| 10 | 24 | (Finland) Mika Salo | Toyota | 1:31.389 | +1.483 | 10 |
| 11 | 8 | (Brazil) Felipe Massa | Sauber-Petronas | 1:31.733 | +1.827 | 11 |
| 12 | 12 | (France) Olivier Panis | BAR-Honda | 1:31.906 | +2.000 | 12 |
| 13 | 25 | (United Kingdom) Allan McNish | Toyota | 1:31.941 | +2.035 | 13 |
| 14 | 10 | (Japan) Takuma Sato | Jordan-Honda | 1:31.999 | +2.093 | 14 |
| 15 | 20 | (Germany) Heinz-Harald Frentzen | Arrows-Cosworth | 1:32.144 | +2.238 | 15 |
| 16 | 17 | (Spain) Pedro de la Rosa | Jaguar-Cosworth | 1:32.281 | +2.375 | 16 |
| 17 | 16 | (United Kingdom) Eddie Irvine | Jaguar-Cosworth | 1:32.510 | +2.604 | 17 |
| 18 | 9 | (Italy) Giancarlo Fisichella | Jordan-Honda | 1:32.591 | +2.685 | 18 |
| 19 | 11 | (Canada) Jacques Villeneuve | BAR-Honda | 1:32.968 | +3.062 | 19 |
| 20 | 23 | (Australia) Mark Webber | Minardi-Asiatech | 1:32.996 | +3.090 | 20 |
| 21 | 21 | (Brazil) Enrique Bernoldi | Arrows-Cosworth | 1:33.360 | +3.454 | 21 |
| 22 | 22 | (Malaysia) Alex Yoong | Minardi-Asiatech | 1:34.251 | +4.345 | 22 |
107% time: 1:36.199

== Warm-up ==
On race morning, a half-hour warm-up session was held in overcast and cool conditions, during which teams and drivers ran installation laps in their spare and race vehicles. Bridgestone-shod cars had the advantage in the cooler weather. Barrichello maintained his form, establishing the quickest time in the final stages of warm-up with a lap of 1:32.671, three-tenths of a second faster than teammate Michael Schumacher, who traded fastest times with Barrichello throughout the session. Coulthard, Räikkönen, Frentzen, Sato, Fisichella, the BAR duo of Villeneuve and Panis and Massa followed in the top ten. Although there were no accidents, multiple drivers went off the circuit during warm-up.

== Race ==
The race began before a crowd of 150,000 spectators at 14:00 local time. It was overcast before the race; the air temperature was 23 °C (73 °F) and the asphalt temperature ranged between 28–32 °C (82–90 °F) and rain was forecast. When the race started, Montoya, on used Michelin tyres, drove right to the inside line as a blocking manoeuvre, but Ralf Schumacher drew alongside going into the first turn Ralf Schumacher took the outside line and braked slower than Montoya, gaining the lead. Coulthard made a brisk getaway but slid wide on turn one, allowing Barrichello and Michael Schumacher to retake their starting positions. Towards the rear of the field, both Jordan drivers collided, with Fisichella spinning into Sato at the first corner after taking the inside line and braking hard to avoid striking Villeneuve. The two drivers were able to continue, but dropped to the back of the field and both made pit stops for checks and repairs to their cars at the end of the first lap. Michael Schumacher passed Montoya for third at the Veedol chicane on the same lap, but Montoya briefly retook the position. Barrichello took the lead from Ralf Schumacher on the inside of the straight linking the Dunlop chicane and Michael Schumacher passed Montoya at the Veedol chicane at the end of lap one.

At the completion of the first lap, Barrichello led Ralf Schumacher by one second, with Michael Schumacher trailing 1.9 seconds in third. Montoya was fourth, followed by Coulthard and Räikkönen. Barrichello began to draw away from Ralf Schumacher, who was being pursued by Michael Schumacher. Bernoldi overtook Irvine for 14th while Villeneuve passed Yoong and De la Rosa to move into 18th. Michael Schumacher took second place after passing Ralf Schumacher on the inside at the left-hand RTL Kurve on the third lap and began to cut the deficit on Barrichello. Panis passed Salo for 12th and Villeneuve overook Webber for 17th. Villeneuve ran wide on lap four but remained 17th. Trulli locked his brakes, ran deep into turn one and was relegated by four other cars, dropping from eighth to 12th on the next lap. Meanwhile, Barrichello and Michael Schumacher kept pulling away from Ralf Schumacher. Trulli reclaimed 11th after passing Panis on lap six, while Salo in 13th spun and lost six spots. Webber made a mistake and went wide on lap seven, dropping to 19th behind De la Rosa and Salo, while Yoong sever a drive-through penalty for a jump start.

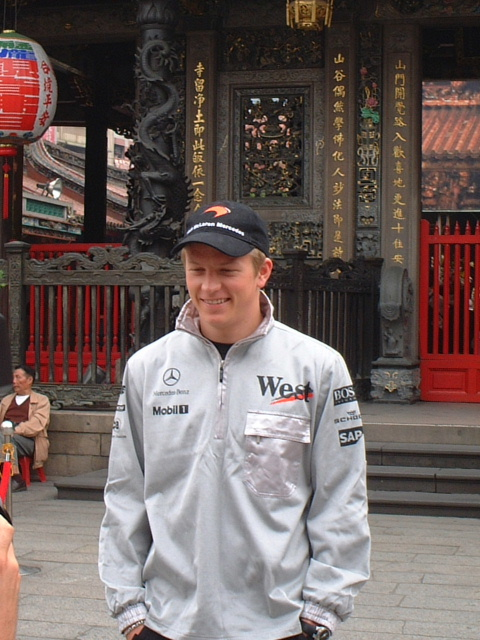
Kimi Räikkönen finished in third, achieving his first podium result since the season-opening Australian Grand Prix.

By lap eight, Michael Schumacher was catching teammate Barrichello and was 1.4 seconds behind him, and was right behind him by lap ten. The two Ferrari drivers were drawing away from the Williams drivers by two or three seconds each lap because they were on a small fuel load and the Williams duo were dealing with higher levels of rear tyre wear, although Barrichello was never more than 1.5 seconds ahead of Michael Schumacher. Trulli reclaimed ninth place on the same lap after passing McNish and Heidfeld, while Frentzen passed Bernoldi for 13th. Fisichella's car lost sections of its sidepod deflector bodywork as he went down the main straight on lap 11 due to airflow, having bouncing severely on the kerbs and grass lining the course earlier in the race; drivers swerved the carbon fibre debris to avoid hitting it. De la Rosa passed Irvine on the same lap to take 16th place. Bernoldi lost 14th after Villeneuve passed him on the 13th lap, while Frentzen ran off the circuit and was passed by Villeneuve and Bernoldi, who also drove off on the following lap. Trulli passed Massa at the Dunlop Kurve chicane for eighth on lap 14.

Räikkonen locked his brakes on the entry to the Yokohama-S corner and ran wide onto the gravel trap. He struggled to drive his car from the outside of the track, allowing Button to moving into sixth on lap 17. The first round of pit stops began four laps later. The Ferrari and Williams teams were employing different strategies – Ferrari were planning a two-stop strategy whereas Williams were only planning for one stop. Michael Schumacher lost control of his Ferrari at the RTL Kurve exit due to reduced downforce and aerodynamic turbulence caused by running close behind teammate Barrichello. He spun onto the tarmac run-off area but continued in second, having lost ten seconds to Barrichello. Michael Schumacher made a pit stop on lap 24 and exited in front of Ralf Schumacher. His teammate Barrichello was the last of the two-stopping drivers to make his first pit stop on lap 25, retaining the race lead.

On lap 28, Fisichella entered the garage to retire with car damage. Coulthard had been close behind Montoya for several laps but was unable to pass because Montoya was speedy down the straight with his BMW engine, delaying Coulthard through the circuit's narrower limits. On the same lap, Coulthard slipstreamed behind Montoya on the start/finish straight, drawing behind him on the inside entering right-hand turn one. He braked later than Montoya, who held the outside line but had severely blistered tyres and lost control of his car's rear over the kerbing. His left-rear wheel struck Coulthard's front-right wheel, and both drivers retired from the race due to suspension damage incurred in the crash. The incident promoted Coulthard's teammate Räikkönen to fourth, Massa to fifth and Heidfeld to sixth. Räikkönen was gaining on Ralf Schumacher when he was called into the pit lane to make his only pit stop sooner than planned on lap 30; he almost lost control of his car's rear entering the pit lane on worn tyres. Ralf Schumacher returned to the race in seventh. Räikkönen set a string of quick laps before his sole pit stop for a new set of tyres and fuel on lap 35, having been 32 seconds ahead of Button. He returned to the circuit in third.

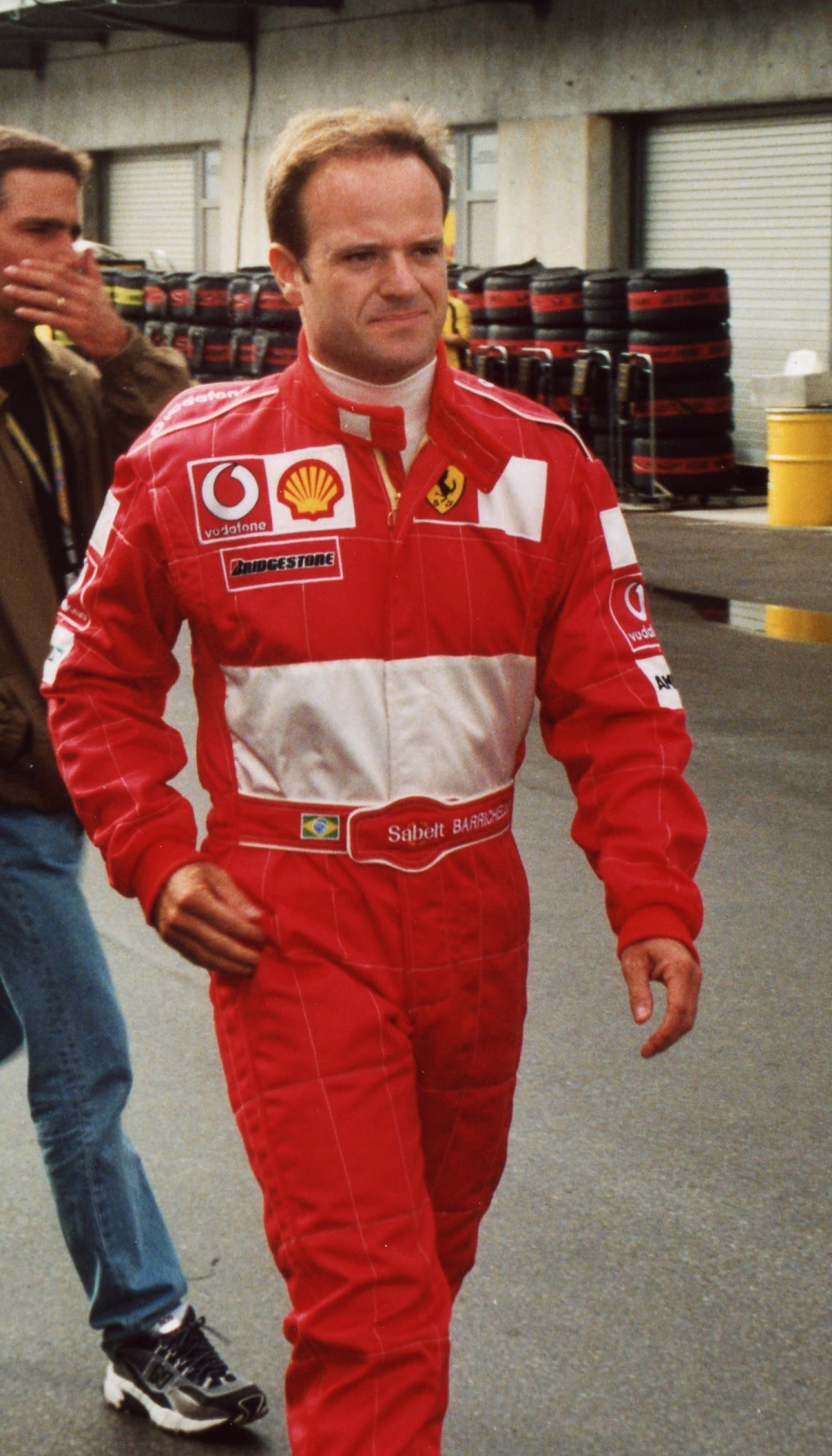
Rubens Barrichello took the second victory of his career after his maiden win at the 2000 German Grand Prix.

The second round of pit stops for drivers on a two-stop strategy began on lap 39. On lap 42, Irvine entered the garage with a loss of hydraulic pressure. Michael Schumacher had closed to within three seconds of teammate Barrichello and made his second pit stop at the conclusion of the following lap. His 7.8-second pit stop kept him second, and he pushed hard in the hopes of passing Barrichello and taking the lead after his teammate's second pit stop. Barrichello led by 27 seconds when he made his second pit stop on lap 45. He maintained a two-second lead after a 7.6-second stop while his teammate Michael Schumacher was blocked by slower cars he was lapping. The focus of attention shifted to whether Ferrari would invoke team orders, but eventually the team urged both drivers to maintain position and prevent an incident,, which was delivered to the drivers with around ten laps remaining. On lap 49, Yoong retired from the race with a hydraulic pump failure. Salo spun on lap 54 and retired at the side of the track with smoke coming from the rear of his Toyota after a gearbox failure a lap later. On lap 55, Frentzen lost control of his Arrows car at turn one while attempting to pass Villeneuve on the start/finish straight for 12th place to avoid a collision with Ralf Schumacher while braking. On the final lap, Bernoldi passed De la Rosa at the Veedol chicane for 10th.

As the race approached its conclusion, the Ferrari drivers at the front slowed by up to four seconds. Thus, Barrichello maintained the lead he had held since the first lap to claim his first victory since the 2000 German Grand Prix and the second of his career. Michael Schumacher finished second, 0.294 seconds behind his teammate, after running closely behind him in the last laps. Räikkönen finished third for his first podium result since the season-opening Australian Grand Prix. Ralf Schumacher drove a difficult to handle car and took fourth. Button secured his first points finish in five races in fifth, and was the final driver on the lead lap. Massa completed the points scorers in sixth. His teammate Heidfeld was seventh after Massa held him off in the closing laps. Trulli took eighth with an intermittent engine fault and Panis took his second successive race finish in ninth. Bernoldi took 10th and De la Rosa was 11th. Villeneuve took 12th, having engine issues limiting his pace. Frentzen was 13th, partly due to a faulty fuel rig during his first pit stop. McNish finished 14th despite his seat pressing onto his left arm, giving him pain. He was ahead of Webber in 15th, who had tyre issues affecting the car's handling during the first stint. Sato was the final classified finisher after going one lap down due to his early pit stop for repairs.

=== Post-race ===
The top three drivers appeared on the podium to collect their trophies and spoke to the media in the subsequent press conference. Barrichello described the race as "fantastic" and praised the performance of his Ferrari, "it was a fantastic race in terms of pushing and performance and I want to thank everyone at Ferrari because the car was really good." Michael Schumacher praised his teammate's work throughout the race and said the team had an "open race", adding, "There is no strong feeling about it because we could not overtake on the circuit, that's it, and after the second pit stop, when he came out in front of me, I knew that's it." Räikkönen aimed to finish on the podium more often but was not able to due to the McLaren's unreliability. He acknowledged that the McLaren was not fast enough to challenge Ferrari but were faster than Williams, "We caught up with them and were able to overtake them, so it was a good race for us."

Ferrari sporting director Jean Todt insisted that Barrichello's win was not timed to satisfy the FIA World Motor Sport Council before Ferrari's disciplinary hearing into their actions at the Austrian Grand Prix where Barrichello was instructed by Ferrari to cede victory to Michael Schumacher on the final lap, "We did not have Wednesday in mind." Ross Brawn, Ferrari's technical director, stated that Michael Schumacher's world championship lead influenced the decision not to race each other, and that a pre-race agreement was reached to let both drivers competing until the final round of pit stops. Ferrari press officer Luca Colajanni claimed that Ferrari did not tell Michael Schumacher not to race Barrichello in the final laps because it was important to avoid risk and score 16 championship points for the World Constructors' Championship. BBC Sport correspondent Jonathan Legard argued that the race was "another display of Ferrari team orders in reverse – and it cheated the crowd in a less controversial and obvious manner" and Michael Schumacher was the faster driver on this occasion.

Montoya apologised to Coulthard at the McLaren motorhome for the race-ending collision. Coulthard said that Montoya needed to "get a grip, The guy is all over the place and it's hardly surprising that he's not won more races. He's brilliant in qualifying but he needs to calm down in races when he's not quick enough. He should look at the big picture." Montoya told Coulthard his spin was caused by a lack of grip and that he had told Williams over the radio about the problem, "It's a bit disappointing because we talked about it beforehand and said that if the tyres were going away before the pit stops we would call." McLaren team principal Ron Dennis attributed fault for the collision to Montoya and claimed Coulthard was ahead of Montoya. Ralf Schumacher called his car "incredibly difficult" to race. Michelin boss Pierre Dupasquier admitted to the manufacturer sending too soft a tyre to the Grand Prix and that the company would introduce a more conservative tyre compound for future races.

Michael Schumacher's second-place finish increased his World Drivers' Championship lead to 46 championship points over Ralf Schumacher in second. Montoya remained in third despite retiring and Barrichello's victory lifted him to joint fourth with Coulthard. Ferrari's one-two finish extended their World Constructors' Championship lead to 45 championship points over the second-placed Williams. McLaren remained in third with 37 championship points while Renault moved another two championship points clear of Sauber with eight races remaining in the season.

=== Race classification ===
Drivers who scored championship points are denoted in bold.

| Pos | No | Driver | Constructor | Tyre | Laps | Time/Retired | Grid | Points |
|---|---|---|---|---|---|---|---|---|
| 1 | 2 | (Brazil) **Rubens Barrichello** | **Ferrari** | B | 60 | 1:35:07.426 | 4 | 10 |
| 2 | 1 | (Germany) **Michael Schumacher** | **Ferrari** | B | 60 | +0.294 | 3 | 6 |
| 3 | 4 | (Finland) **Kimi Räikkönen** | **McLaren-Mercedes** | M | 60 | +46.435 | 6 | 4 |
| 4 | 5 | (Germany) **Ralf Schumacher** | **Williams-BMW** | M | 60 | +1:06.963 | 2 | 3 |
| 5 | 15 | (United Kingdom) **Jenson Button** | **Renault** | M | 60 | +1:16.944 | 8 | 2 |
| 6 | 8 | (Brazil) **Felipe Massa** | **Sauber-Petronas** | B | 59 | +1 Lap | 11 | 1 |
| 7 | 7 | (Germany) Nick Heidfeld | Sauber-Petronas | B | 59 | +1 Lap | 9 | |
| 8 | 14 | (Italy) Jarno Trulli | Renault | M | 59 | +1 Lap | 7 | |
| 9 | 12 | (France) Olivier Panis | BAR-Honda | B | 59 | +1 Lap | 12 | |
| 10 | 21 | (Brazil) Enrique Bernoldi | Arrows-Cosworth | B | 59 | +1 Lap | 21 | |
| 11 | 17 | (Spain) Pedro de la Rosa | Jaguar-Cosworth | M | 59 | +1 Lap | 16 | |
| 12 | 11 | (Canada) Jacques Villeneuve | BAR-Honda | B | 59 | +1 Lap | 19 | |
| 13 | 20 | (Germany) Heinz-Harald Frentzen | Arrows-Cosworth | B | 59 | +1 Lap | 15 | |
| 14 | 25 | (United Kingdom) Allan McNish | Toyota | M | 59 | +1 Lap | 13 | |
| 15 | 23 | (Australia) Mark Webber | Minardi-Asiatech | M | 58 | +2 Laps | 20 | |
| 16 | 10 | (Japan) Takuma Sato | Jordan-Honda | B | 58 | +2 Laps | 14 | |
| Ret | 24 | (Finland) Mika Salo | Toyota | M | 51 | Gearbox | 10 | |
| Ret | 22 | (Malaysia) Alex Yoong | Minardi-Asiatech | M | 48 | Hydraulics | 22 | |
| Ret | 16 | (United Kingdom) Eddie Irvine | Jaguar-Cosworth | M | 41 | Hydraulics | 17 | |
| Ret | 6 | (Colombia) Juan Pablo Montoya | Williams-BMW | M | 27 | Collision | 1 | |
| Ret | 3 | (United Kingdom) David Coulthard | McLaren-Mercedes | M | 27 | Collision damage | 5 | |
| Ret | 9 | (Italy) Giancarlo Fisichella | Jordan-Honda | B | 26 | Collision damage | 18 | |

== Championship standings after the race ==
Drivers' Championship standings

| +/– | Pos | Driver | Points |
|---|---|---|---|
| | 1 | (Germany) Michael Schumacher | 76 |
| | 2 | (Germany) Ralf Schumacher | 30 |
| | 3 | (Colombia) Juan Pablo Montoya | 27 |
| 1 | 4 | (Brazil) Rubens Barrichello | 26 |
| 1 | 5 | (United Kingdom) David Coulthard | 26 |

Constructors' Championship standings

| +/– | Pos | Constructor | Points |
|---|---|---|---|
| | 1 | (Italy) Ferrari | 102 |
| | 2 | (United Kingdom) Williams-BMW | 57 |
| | 3 | (United Kingdom) McLaren-Mercedes | 37 |
| | 4 | (France) Renault | 14 |
| | 5 | (Switzerland) Sauber-Petronas | 9 |
Sources:

- Note: Only the top five positions are included for both sets of standings.

| Previous race: 2002 Canadian Grand Prix | FIA Formula One World Championship; 2002 season | Next race: 2002 British Grand Prix |
| Previous race: 2001 European Grand Prix | European Grand Prix | Next race: 2003 European Grand Prix |
