= Pierre Dupasquier =

- Born: 27 July 1937 (age 88); Metz, France
- Occupations: Director of Competition, Michelin [1973-2005]

Pierre Antoine Eugène Dupasquier (born 27 July 1937 in Metz, France) is a former head of Michelin's Competition Department.

== Early life ==
Born in France, he spent his early life as a pilot with the French Air Force serving in the Algerian War. After discharge from the military, he studied engineering at the École catholique des arts et métiers graduating in 1960.

== Michelin ==
Dupasquier was hired by Michelin's research division in 1962. Five years later, he switched to a representative role in selling Michelin tires to road car companies; he moved to the Competitions Department in 1973.

Dupasquier was part of the group that brought radial tyres into Formula One during the period he led Michelin in the sport from 1977-1984. Michelin's first Formula One world champion was Jody Scheckter in 1979 driving for Scuderia Ferrari.

During this first period of Dupasquier's stewardship of Michelin in F1, they had great success with 4 world championships for Scheckter, Nelson Piquet twice with Brabham and finally Niki Lauda with McLaren in 1984.

Dupasquier would once again lead Michelin on their return to Formula One in 2001 until his retirement in 2005 a season won by a Michelin shod Renault for Fernando Alonso. It was also in this season all cars running Michelin tyres would withdraw from the 2005 US Grand Prix.

Across his leadership of Michelin Competition, the manufacturer claimed 1300 victories and 180 world titles.

He was awarded the Legion of Honour in December 2006 for his services to French motorsport.
