= Benetton B201 =

Formula One racing car

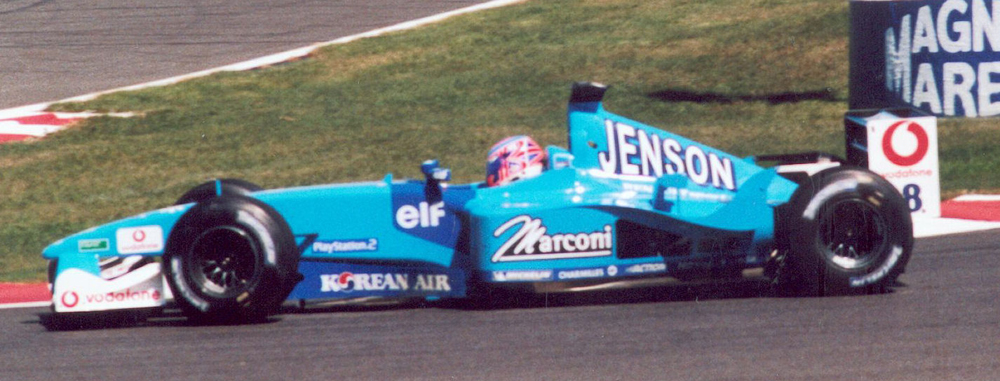
- Jenson Button driving a B201 at the 2001 French Grand Prix
- Category: Formula One
- Constructor: Benetton
- Designers: Pat Symonds (Executive Engineer); Mike Gascoyne (Technical Director); Tim Densham (Chief Designer); Ben Agathangelou (Head of Aerodynamics); Jean Jacques His (Engine Technical Director)
- Predecessor: B200
- Successor: Renault R202

Technical specifications
- Chassis: Carbon-fibre monocoque
- Suspension (front): double wishbone, pushrod
- Suspension (rear): double wishbone, pushrod
- Engine: Renault RS21 V10 (111°) naturally aspirated mid-engine
- Transmission: Benetton 6-speed longitudinal semi-automatic sequential
- Power: 780 hp @ 17,400 rpm
- Weight: 600 kilograms (1,300 lb)
- Fuel: Elf
- Tyres: Michelin

Competition history
- Notable entrants: Mild Seven Benetton Renault
- Notable drivers: 7. (Italy) Giancarlo Fisichella; 8. (United Kingdom) Jenson Button
- Debut: 2001 Australian Grand Prix
- Last event: 2001 Japanese Grand Prix
Races	Wins	Podiums	Poles	F/Laps
17	0	1	0	0
- Constructors' Championships: 0
- Drivers' Championships: 0

The Benetton B201 was the car with which the Benetton team competed in the 2001 Formula One World Championship; it was the last car constructed and raced by Benetton. It was driven by Italian Giancarlo Fisichella, who was in his fourth year with the team, and Briton Jenson Button, who moved from Williams after his début season in 2000. Australian Mark Webber served as test driver whilst racing in F3000.

== Design and development ==
Parts for the B201 began testing early using a modified B200, known as the B200B. This car was tested up until late January, with both Button and Fisichella working on the RS21 engine and electronic systems for the new car.

On February 2, Fisichella completed the first shakedown of the new B201 before a private press launch. Days later, the car was officially launched in an extravagant ceremony in Piazza San Marco, Venice. The event was said to cost around $500,000.

In early interviews, the team were very satisfied with the development of the new Renault RS21 engine. It was an unusually wide angled 112° configuration which allowed a lower centre of gravity and was notably lighter than previous engines used by Benetton from Supertec. However, due to reliability issues during the season it was strengthened significantly which added to the vehicle weight. The team had hired Mike Gascoyne from Jordan Grand Prix during 2000, and in January 2001 also brought over Gascoyne's former Jordan colleague, Mark Smith.

For 2001, Benetton were one of the teams that switched from Bridgestone to the new alternative manufacturer Michelin.

The B201 did not impress in testing, a schedule that included the drivers embarking on 9 days at Estoril Circuit. During the season, Renault chief Jean-Jacques His claimed that the team's 2001 designs were 'hacked' the season prior, and a huge redesign was the reason for their lack of pace.

In season testing was extensive, as they got to grips with the aerodynamic and engine challenges. A major update to the B201 at the midpoint of 2001 allowed a significant improvement for the second half of the year.

== Racing performance ==
The season started poorly for the B201. Fisichella qualified 17th at Albert Park, after losing time due to reliability issues. He later described the B201 as undriveable. In the race, both cars were lapped by the field and Button retired late due an exhaust problem. At the second round in Malaysia, the car was still struggling throughout practice and qualifying. In the race, only Button finished - in 11th - which marked the team's best result. The B201 finally scored a point at Brazil, when Fisichella finished in sixth place.

As the season moved into Europe, reliability issues continued to hamper the B201's performance. Fisichella would retire in San Marino and Monaco, whilst neither car finished the Austrian Grand Prix. Button nearly scored points in Monaco, where the team had shown pace throughout the weekend, but would finish seventh.

After a double retirement in Canada, the team returned to the European Grand Prix with confidence in a new launch control system to be used for the first time on the B201. Whilst some improvements were noted during practice, both cars finished outside the top 10. Further developments were added to the B201 ahead of the next race in France, although results did not notably improve until the German Grand Prix. For the first time, both cars finished in the points with Fisichella in fourth, and Button fifth. However, after this success, both cars would retire from the next race and Button from the following two.

The B201's best finish would come in Belgium, with Fisichella finishing third in a chaotic race that was red flagged in the opening laps, before being restarted.

No further points were added to the team total after this race, and the B201 scored a total of 10 points with Benetton finishing the season in seventh place in the Constructors Championship. Overall, the team vastly improved the results in the second half of the season in contrast to the previous 1998–2000 seasons.

== Performance ==
in the 6/2001 Autozeitung they found the Benetton B201 had a performance of:

0 - 100 kph	2.6 s
0 - 200 kph	5.0 s
0 - 250 kph	7.1 s
0 - 300 kph	9.7 s
1/4 mile	8.8 s @ 288 kph (179 mph)
200 kph - 0	55 m (180 ft)
Top speed	350 kph (217 mph)

== Sponsorship and livery ==
The livery was similar to the previous season with subtle changes on the dark blue graphics. Many of the sponsors from 2000 were retained including D2 (in place with Vodafone), Marconi and Korean Air. PlayStation 2 joined as one of the team's major sponsors.

Benetton used the Mild Seven logos, except at the French, British and United States Grand Prix, where they were replaced with their driver names or "Benetton".

At the United States Grand Prix, an American flag was featured on the side of the car, in response to the September 11 attacks.

== Renault B201 ==
Following the conclusion of the season, Renault, who were due to formally become the replacement for Benetton in the World Championship, utilised the B201 for a number of pre-season tests. These took place throughout late 2001 and early 2002 with Jenson Button, Jarno Trulli and Fernando Alonso driving. The cars were temporarily repainted in yellow and white with black details (based on Renault's famous livery from the late 1970s and early 1980s). The cars were used to test various engine, aerodynamic and electronic improvements.

== Complete Formula One results ==
(key) (results in bold indicate pole position)

Year	Entrant	Engine	Tyres	Drivers	1	2	3	4	5	6	7	8	9	10	11	12	13	14	15	16	17	Points	WCC
2001	Mild Seven Benetton Renault	Renault V10	**MI**		AUS	MAL	BRA	SMR	ESP	AUT	MON	CAN	EUR	FRA	GBR	GER	HUN	BEL	ITA	USA	JPN	**10**	**7th**
2001	Mild Seven Benetton Renault	Renault V10	**MI**	(Italy) Giancarlo Fisichella	13	Ret	6	Ret	14	Ret	Ret	Ret	11	11	13	4	Ret	3	10	8	17^{†}	**10**	**7th**
2001	Mild Seven Benetton Renault	Renault V10	**MI**	(United Kingdom) Jenson Button	14^{†}	11	10	12	15	Ret	7	Ret	13	16^{†}	15	5	Ret	Ret	Ret	9	7	**10**	**7th**
