= B200 =

B200 may refer to:

- Beechcraft Super King Air, a family of aircraft
- Benetton B200, a Formula One car
- Nvidia B200, a GPU
- Volvo B200 engine
- B200, a Mercedes-Benz B-Class car
