= 2000 Brazilian Grand Prix =

2nd round of the 2000 Formula One season

Coordinates: 23°42′13″S 46°41′59″W

Race 2 of 17 in the 2000 Formula One World Championship
← Previous race	Next race →

Race details
- Date: 26 March 2000
- Official name: Grande Prêmio Marlboro do Brasil 2000
- Location: Autódromo José Carlos Pace, São Paulo, Brazil
- Course: Permanent racing facility
- Course length: 4.309 km (2.677 miles)
- Distance: 71 laps, 305.939 km (190.681 miles)
- Weather: Sunny with some clouds, Air: 22 °C (72 °F), Track: 35 °C (95 °F)
- Attendance: 72,000

Pole position
Driver	(Finland) Mika Häkkinen	McLaren-Mercedes
- Time: 1:14.111

Fastest lap
Driver	(Germany) Michael Schumacher	Ferrari
- Time: 1:14.755 on lap 48

Podium
First	(Germany) Michael Schumacher	Ferrari
Second	(Italy) Giancarlo Fisichella	Benetton-Playlife
Third	(Germany) Heinz-Harald Frentzen	Jordan-Mugen-Honda

The 2000 Brazilian Grand Prix (officially the Grande Prêmio Marlboro do Brasil 2000) was a Formula One motor race held on 26 March 2000 at the Autódromo José Carlos Pace in São Paulo, Brazil. The race, which was the second round of the 2000 Formula One World Championship and the 29th Brazilian Grand Prix, drew 72,000 spectators. Michael Schumacher, a Ferrari driver, won the 71-lap race after starting third. Benetton's Giancarlo Fisichella finished second, and Jordan's Heinz-Harald Frentzen was third.

McLaren's Mika Häkkinen qualified on pole position and led the first lap of the race before being passed by World Drivers' Championship leader Michael Schumacher on lap two. Following that, Michael Schumacher built a 17.6-second lead before making the first of two pit stops for fuel and tyres on lap 20. After Häkkinen retired with a shortage of engine oil pressure ten laps later, he retook the lead. In the final 12 laps, David Coulthard in the other McLaren gained on Michael Schumacher as the latter slowed to manage an oil pressure problem. He was not close enough to make a pass for the win and Michael Schumacher took his second consecutive victory of the season and the 37th of his career.

Following the race, Coulthard was disqualified from second place due to an illegal front wing endplate. McLaren submitted an appeal with the Fédération Internationale de l'Automobile's International Court of Appeal, which was denied. The disqualification moved every driver behind Coulthard forward by a single position. The result extended Michael Schumacher's lead atop the World Drivers' Championship to 12 championship points. Fisichella moved from fifth to second as Rubens Barrichello in the second Ferrari fell to third after not finishing the race. Ferrari further increased their lead in the World Constructors' Championship to 18 championship points as Benetton advanced from fourth to second with fifteen races remaining in the season.

== Background ==
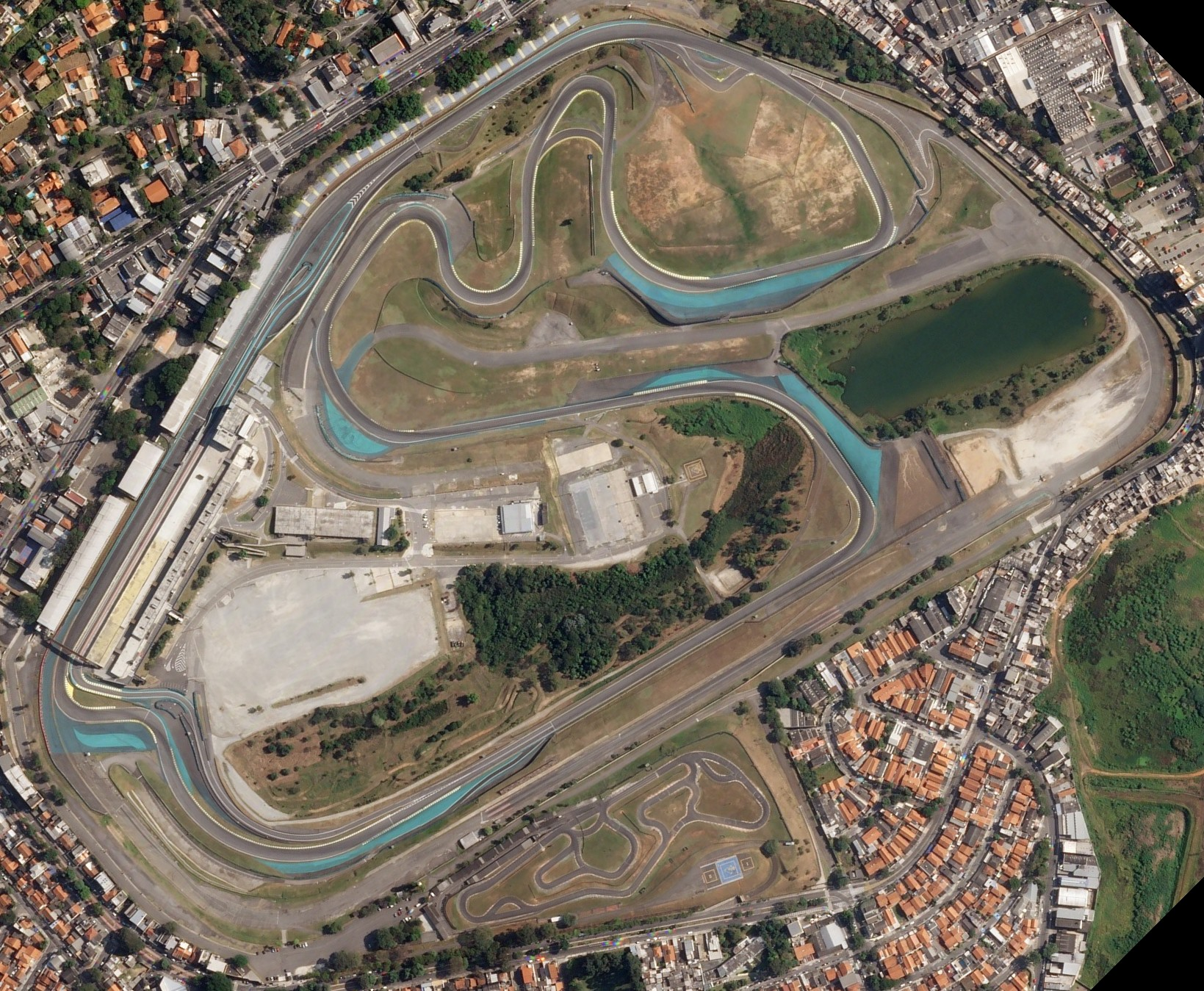
The Autódromo José Carlos Pace (pictured in 2018), where the race was held.

The 2000 Brazilian Grand Prix was the second of 17 races in the 2000 Formula One World Championship and the 29th Brazilian Grand Prix. On 26 March. it took place at the 15-turn 4.309 km (2.677 mi) Autódromo José Carlos Pace in the Brazilian city of São Paulo over 71 laps. It was the second of six non-European Grands Prix. The high-altitude, anti-clockwise track featured significant elevation changes, putting a heavy load of g-force on the left side of drivers' necks. Teams modified their cars to run at medium to high levels of downforce and dampers, springs and suspensions were tuned to adapt to the bumpy track surface. Bridgestone, Formula One's control tyre supplier, supplied teams with soft and medium dry compound tyres.

Following his victory in the preceding Australian Grand Prix, Ferrari driver Michael Schumacher led the World Drivers' Championship with ten championship points, followed by teammate Rubens Barrichello with six championship points and Williams' Ralf Schumacher with four championship points. Jacques Villeneuve of British American Racing (BAR) was fourth with three championship points and Giancarlo Fisichella of Benetton was fifth with two championship points. Ferrari led the World Constructors' Championship with a maximum of 16 championship points. Williams and BAR tied for third with four championship points each, and Benetton were fourth with two championship points.

Prior to the event, most the 11 teams tested their cars and new components at various locations across Europe. McLaren, Jordan, Williams, Jaguar and Prost tested at the Silverstone Circuit in the United Kingdom from 14 to 16 March. Luca Badoer, a Ferrari test driver, completed shakedown runs at the Fiorano Circuit in northern Italy. On the first two days of testing, McLaren test driver Olivier Panis led; on day three, Williams's Jenson Button went fastest. The BAR, Arrows, Sauber and Minardi teams did not test before the Grand Prix.

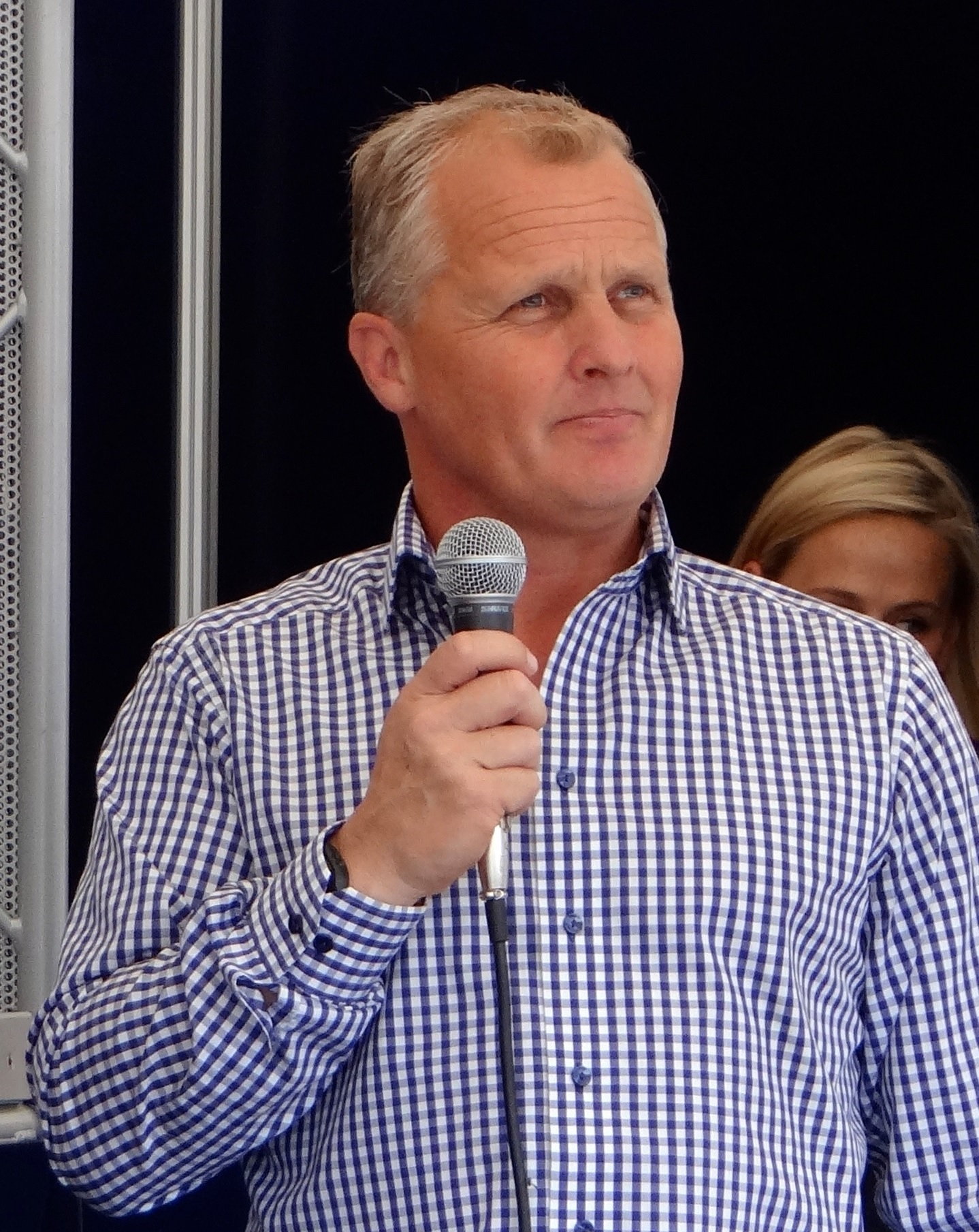
Johnny Herbert (pictured in 2014) criticised the resurfacing of the race track and voiced fears of a major accident occurring.

The press and bookmakers considered Michael Schumacher the favourite to win the race. In response to a statement by McLaren team principal Ron Dennis, who claimed Ferrari was not as competitive as McLaren, Schumacher expressed optimism about a continuing challenge to McLaren for the rest of the season. After faulty seals on their pneumatic valve systems forced him and two-time world champion Mika Häkkinen to retire from the preceding Australian Grand Prix, McLaren's David Coulthard predicted the team would start on the front row and win: "We weren't beaten fair and square in the race because we dropped out. You have to give Ferrari credit because they won when we dropped out and that's our mistake. But it means we come here believing we are competitive and still have a chance."

The Autódromo José Carlos Pace was resurfaced in February to try to reduce its bumpiness. The pit lane exit was relocated from the Senna S chicane entry to the Repa Opposta straight. Following Ricardo Zonta's crash and injury during the 1999 race, a larger run-off area was installed to the outside of Laranjinha turn, and its concrete barrier was padded with tyres. The Fédération Internationale de l'Automobile (FIA; Formula One's governing body) technical delegate, Charlie Whiting, inspected the circuit and ordered that the pit lane barriers be moved to improve driver access. The drivers were divided about the resurfacing work. Jaguar's Eddie Irvine criticised the track's condition. His teammate Johnny Herbert described the bumps approaching the start/finish straight as "horrendous," raising concerns about a repeat of Stéphane Sarrazin's 1999 accident. Conversely, Barrichello and his teammate Michael Schumacher said the track was better for them.

The Grand Prix featured 11 teams (each representing a different constructor) with no changes from the season entry list. Several teams modified their cars, either to refine aerodynamic appendages or to address reliability issues that arose during the Australian Grand Prix. McLaren identified an air filter failure which led to the pneumatic valve system problem in the previous race and modified its design to prevent it from reoccurring. Ford-Cosworth altered its engine lubrication system while the Arrows team altered the steering linkage design. The FIA granted Arrows permission to compete after changing the headrests design in its A21 car to protect the driver.

== Practice ==
The race was preceded by four practice sessions, two one-hour sessions on Friday and two 45-minute sessions on Saturday. The weather was hot and clear for the Friday sessions. Barrichello led with a 1:17.631 lap after making minor changes to his car's aerodynamic setup before the morning session. Häkkinen, Coulthard, Michael Schumacher, Villeneuve, Prost's Jean Alesi, Fisichella, Jordan's Heinz-Harald Frentzen, Sauber's Mika Salo and Arrows's Jos Verstappen rounded out the top ten drivers. Alesi spun three times during the session, removing the front wing on the third. A driveshaft joint leak ended Michael Schumacher's session ended early after eight laps and Zonta was restricted to four timed laps after debris accumulation overheated his engine. A free-ranging dog ran onto the circuit and was knocked over by marshals in a car, interrupting practice.

Häkkinen improved his 1999 pole position lap by six-tenths of a second with three minutes remaining in the afternoon session, setting the day's fastest lap of 1:15.896. Second through tenth were Michael Schumacher, Coulthard, Barrichello, Pedro de la Rosa's Arrows, Alesi, Verstappen, Jordan's Jarno Trulli, Villeneuve and Fisichella. A brake and balance issue caused Ralf Schumacher to go off the track twice. Alexander Wurz spun and beached his Benetton at Mergulho corner. Coulthard spent part of the session in the pit lane as McLaren replaced his front wing after he drove onto the grass midway through. Verstappen experimented with a tyre compound that altered his car's setup and landed him in a gravel trap at the end of practice.

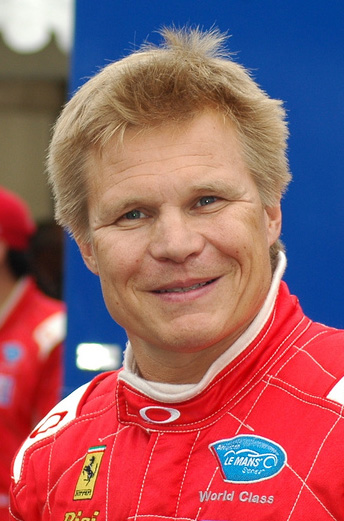
Mika Salo (pictured in 2009) experienced a rear wing failure that caused him to crash in the final free practice session.

The weather remained hot and dry for Saturday's two practice sessions. Different ride height setups were tested on teams' cars, resulting in a noticeable difference in performance. They also selected the tyre compounds for the rest of the weekend. Coulthard led the third practice session with a lap of 1:15.035, followed by his teammate Häkkinen, Ferrari teammates Michael Schumacher and Barrichello, Frentzen, Fisichella, Trulli, Irvine, Minardi's Marc Gené and Alesi. During the session, Michael Schumacher's team spent an hour and ten minutes changing a problematic engine. Gastón Mazzacane's Minardi had an oil leak, limiting him to five timed laps and preventing him from participating in the final practice session later that day.

Hakkinen's lap of 1:14.159 on a new set of tyres led the fourth session, with teammate Coulthard third. Barrichello separated them. Michael Schumacher was fourth, Trulli fifth, while Fisichella was sixth, repeating his third practice result. Villeneuve, Verstappen, Ralf Schumacher and Frentzen completed the top ten. While testing a new rear wing, Barrichello spun twice, one of which was caused by a broken footrest. Frentzen and his teammate Trulli ran into a gravel trap, causing minor bodywork damage to their vehicles. Zonta lost track time due to a gearbox actuator fault and ran into a gravel trap. Button's engine failed, laying oil on the racing line between the Laranjinha and Bico do Pato corners. Salo's rear wing failed on the start/finish straight, causing him to spin as he braked before the Senna S chicane and hit the wall. He was unhurt.

== Qualifying ==
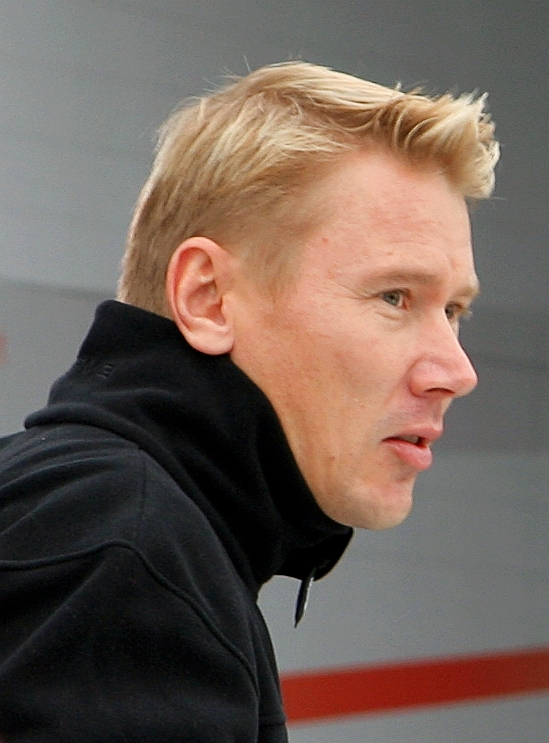
Mika Häkkinen (pictured in 2006) took the 23rd pole position of his career as a result of recording the fastest lap in qualifying.

During Saturday's one-hour qualifying session, drivers simultaneously circulated the track. Each driver was limited to twelve laps; their fastest laps determined the race's starting order. The 107% rule was in effect during qualifying, requiring each driver to stay within 107% of the fastest lap to qualify for the race. Heavy rain fell during the session's final 15 minutes, making the track slippery and preventing drivers from lapping faster. A heavy wind caused a 6 ft (1.8 m) gantry-mounted cardboard advertising hoarding connected by nylon ties above the start/finish straight to detach from the fasteners and fall 10 m (33 ft) onto the track, forcing qualifying to be stopped three times to have them removed. Häkkinen lapped fastest before the rain began with 15 minutes to go at 1:14.111 lap for his second consecutive and 23rd career pole position. His teammate Coulthard qualified second, with the Ferraris of Michael Schumacher and Barrichello third and fourth, respectively; both Ferrari drivers aborted runs because of the falling boards. Schumacher understeered onto the grass on his second timed lap, damaging his car's undertray on the corrugations of a high-mounted kerb. He finished qualifying in the spare Ferrari. Because of the stoppage, Barrichello had to abandon a fast lap. Fisichella, fifth, praised his car's handling. Irvine in sixth was happy with his Jaguar's grip and balance.

Frentzen qualified seventh after Pedro Diniz slowed him. Zonta, eighth, focused on aerodynamic setup to improve his car's handling. Between the final practice session and qualifying, Button switched engines and worked with race engineer Tim Preston to change his car's setup. He was fourth early on before falling to ninth. Villeneuve qualified tenth after traffic slowed two of his timed laps and he ran onto the grass. Ralf Schumacher was the fastest driver to not qualify in the top ten after trying different spring rates but failing to improve his chassis setup. Trulli spun into a gravel trap at the Bico de Peto hairpin on his first timed lap. He returned to the pit lane to drive the spare Jordan car; an electronic control unit fault affected its gear selection, leaving him 12th. Wurz, 13th, had traffic slow all of his laps. Clutch issues put Verstappen 14th. Alesi, 15th, swerved at more than 250 km/h (160 mph) to avoid a falling advertising hoarding that came loose in the winds, damaging his car's front wing. Alesi was unhurt. The rain slowed De la Rosa in 16th. Car setup issues put Herbert 17th. Gené in 18th ventured onto the track early in qualifying. Nick Heidfeld used the spare Prost car to secure 19th after a clutch failure in his race car. Diniz in 20th and teammate Salo in 22nd had similar rear wing failures. Mazzacane, 21st, drove the spare Minardi car after fuel pressure issues.

=== Post-qualifying ===
Sauber announced its withdrawal from the race during the second stoppage, citing a lack of time in Brazil to analyse and repair the structural integrity of the rear wings on both of their cars since the team did not have the facilities to investigate at Interlagos. When Sauber returned to their Hinwil headquarters, they discovered that the track's bumpy surface had caused both of their cars to have higher-than-expected impact loads; Salo's rear wing failed on the lower plane while Diniz's failed on the upper plane.

=== Qualifying classification ===
Pos	No.	Driver	Constructor	Time	Gap	Grid
1	1	(Finland) Mika Häkkinen	McLaren-Mercedes	1:14.111	—	1
2	2	(United Kingdom) David Coulthard	McLaren-Mercedes	1:14.285	+0.174	2
3	3	(Germany) Michael Schumacher	Ferrari	1:14.508	+0.397	3
4	4	(Brazil) Rubens Barrichello	Ferrari	1:14.636	+0.525	4
5	11	(Italy) Giancarlo Fisichella	Benetton-Playlife	1:15.375	+1.264	5
6	7	(United Kingdom) Eddie Irvine	Jaguar-Cosworth	1:15.425	+1.314	6
7	5	(Germany) Heinz-Harald Frentzen	Jordan-Mugen-Honda	1:15.455	+1.344	7
8	23	(Brazil) Ricardo Zonta	BAR-Honda	1:15.484	+1.373	8
9	10	(United Kingdom) Jenson Button	Williams-BMW	1:15.490	+1.379	9
10	22	(Canada) Jacques Villeneuve	BAR-Honda	1:15.515	+1.404	10
11	9	(Germany) Ralf Schumacher	Williams-BMW	1:15.561	+1.450	11
12	6	(Italy) Jarno Trulli	Jordan-Mugen-Honda	1:15.627	+1.516	12
13	12	(Austria) Alexander Wurz	Benetton-Playlife	1:15.664	+1.553	13
14	19	(Netherlands) Jos Verstappen	Arrows-Supertec	1:15.704	+1.593	14
15	14	(France) Jean Alesi	Prost-Peugeot	1:15.715	+1.604	15
16	18	(Spain) Pedro de la Rosa	Arrows-Supertec	1:16.002	+1.891	16
17	8	(United Kingdom) Johnny Herbert	Jaguar-Cosworth	1:16.250	+2.139	17
18	20	(Spain) Marc Gené	Minardi-Fondmetal	1:16.380	+2.269	18
19	15	(Germany) Nick Heidfeld	Prost-Peugeot	1:17.112	+3.001	19
20	16	(Brazil) Pedro Diniz	Sauber-Petronas	1:17.178	+3.067	—
21	21	(Argentina) Gastón Mazzacane	Minardi-Fondmetal	1:17.512	+3.401	20
22	17	(Finland) Mika Salo	Sauber-Petronas	1:18.703	+4.592	—
107% time: 1:19.299

== Warm-up ==
On Sunday morning, a 30-minute warm-up session was held in hot, overcast weather. All drivers fine-tuned their race set-ups and drove their spare cars. Häkkinen set the session's fastest lap at 1:16.343, ahead of Michael Schumacher, Coulthard, Barrichello, Verstappen, Ralf Schumacher, Gené, Fisichella and Zonta. Wurz's car stalled at the exit of the pit lane ten minutes in, and the session was stopped. For the rest of the session, he drove the spare Benetton B200 car. Alesi's engine failed, so he switched to the spare Prost AP03, which had a rear wing failure on the bumpy start/finish straight, resulting in a second stoppage.

Prost examined Alesi's rear wing after the warm-up session and determined that its failure was caused by older bodywork parts on his car, and readied its spare chassis in case it was needed. The team said it was unconcerned about the drivers' safety and confirmed their participation in the race.

== Race ==
The race began before 72,000 spectators (mostly supporting Ferrari) at 14:00 local time. At the start, the weather was hot and dry, with an ambient temperature of 22 °C (72 °F), a track temperature of 35 °C (95 °F), and a humidity of 76%. According to computer simulations, drivers who made a single pit stop had the fastest overall race times. Wurz's engine stalled during the formation lap, delaying Alesi and Herbert; both drivers took their starting positions. Wurz began from the pit lane. Häkkinen led the field into the Senna S chicane after a brisk start from the grid. Michael Schumacher passed Coulthard for second, who had wheelspin and failed to challenge Häkkinen for the lead. Coulthard kept third after Barrichello made a slow start. Irvine overtook Fisichella for fifth place. Verstappen advanced from 14th to 11th by the end of the first lap. Button fell from 9th to 14th over the same distance. Trulli passed Ralf Schumacher and Villeneuve to take tenth on the track's inside.

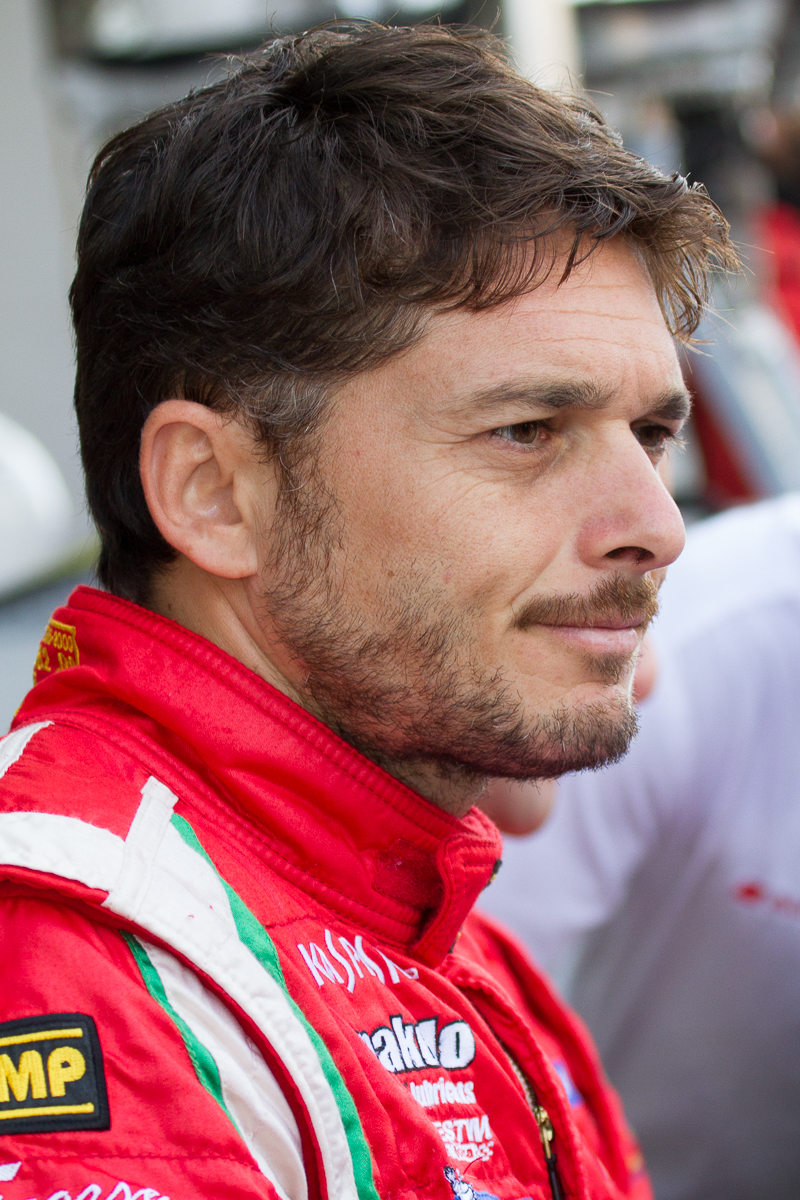
Giancarlo Fisichella (pictured in 2012) earned his first podium finish of the season in second.

As the top two approached the start/finish line, Michael Schumacher, who had been close behind Häkkinen's heavier car throughout lap one, steered off the racing line to take the lead heading into the Senna S chicane. Barrichello slipstreamed past Coulthard for third on the start/finish straight. He then ran wide, returning Coulthard to third. By the end of lap two, Barrichello had retaken third after a gearbox fault lost Coulthard the use of the first three gears and was slower in the slow-speed corners. A malfunctioning radio prevented Coulthard from alerting McLaren to the problem, meaning he braked earlier as engine braking proved ineffective and changed his driving line. With a series of fastest laps, Michael Schumacher increased his advantage over Häkkinen to four seconds by lap 4 and to 15 seconds by lap 15 for a large enough gap for him to make an early pit stop for fuel. In the meantime, Trulli passed Zonta for eighth, Button overtook Alesi for 13th and Heidfeld lost 16th to De la Rosa. Verstappen progressed from 11th to seventh by passing Villeneuve, Zonta, Frentzen, and Fisichella as Alesi overtook Ralf Schumacher, Villeneuve, Zonta, and Frentzen to advance to ninth. During this time, Wurz and Heidfeld both experienced separate engine failures on laps seven and nine, while Alesi experienced an electrical failure at the Bico de Pato hairpin on lap 11.

After Häkkinen ran wide at the conclusion of lap 14, Barrichello closed up. Before the Senna S chicane, he braked, slipstreamed Häkkinen, and turned left to pass him for second at the start of the 15th lap. De la Rosa passed Herbert for 14th on that lap and Trulli overtook Irvine for fifth into the Curva do Sol turn on lap 16. That lap, Villeneuve retired with a race-long gearbox problem. The Ferrari and McLaren teams used various pit stop strategies; the Ferrari team planned for two stops in the hope that they would establish a significant enough lead over McLaren on the circuit. McLaren, conversely, planned just one pit stop because they hypothesised that the long pit lane would lose them time. When the first round of fuel and tyre pit stops began four laps later, Michael Schumacher had a 17.6-second advantage over the rest of the field. He rejoined the track in third and Barrichello led the next two laps until his stop that dropped the latter to fourth. On lap 21, Irvine lost control of his vehicle's rear into the Bico de Pato hairpin and crashed into a tyre barrier. Six laps later, Barrichello pulled into the pit lane with smoke billowing from his car due to a hydraulic motor issue that had spread from the steering wheel to the throttle linkage. As Barrichello exited the car to retire a small fire was extinguished by his mechanics.

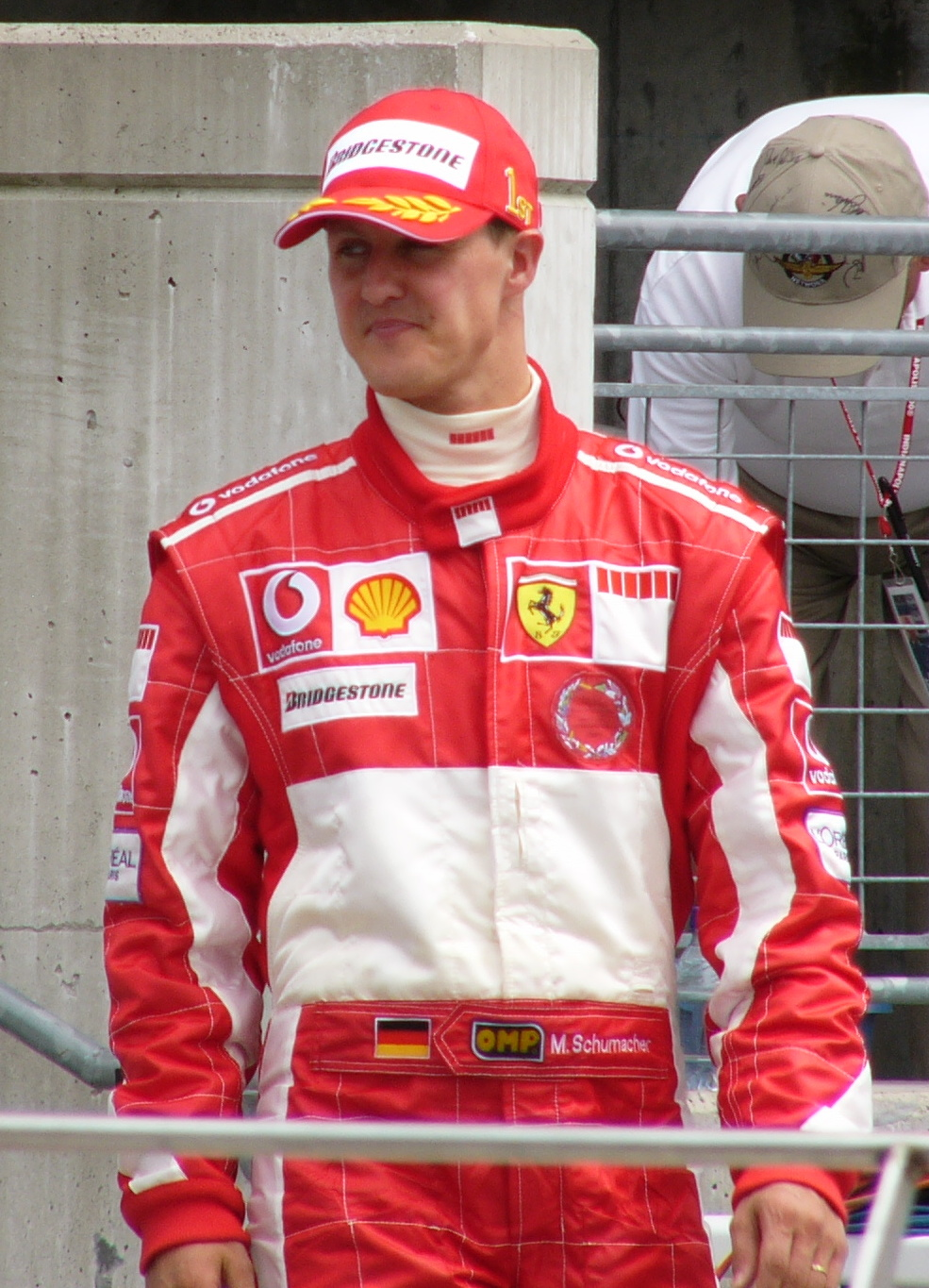
Michael Schumacher (pictured in 2005) took his second win of the season and the 37th of his career.

At the conclusion of the 28th lap, Trulli made the first of his two stops from fourth place, emerging in seventh. Before he slowed with a loss of oil engine pressure on the 30th lap, Häkkinen had pulled away to lead Michael Schumacher by 12 seconds since there was less fuel in his car. He slowed and retired in his garage. Michael Schumacher retook the lead, with the yet-to-stop Coulthard second, Verstappen third, and Fisichella fourth. Coulthard lapped to within a tenth of a second of Michael Schumacher who slowed slightly with an imbalance in all four of his tyres as Ralf Schumacher challenged Fisichella for fourth. On lap 32, Gené retired from 11th with an engine failure. Verstappen (who had conditioning issues) and his teammate De la Rosa made their first pit stops on laps 35 and 37. Four laps later, Frentzen was the first driver on a one-stop strategy to enter the pit lane earlier than scheduled because of heavy rear tyre wear losing him five seconds. Coulthard made his only stop on lap 43 and remained in second position. Michael Schumacher led by 48 seconds when he made his second pit stop on the 51st lap and retained the lead. On the same lap, Fisichella was kept on the track by his team until he made his only pit stop of the race and kept third place.

On lap 51, Herbert retired in the pit lane with a gearbox failure. Four laps later, De la Rosa lost concentration, running into a gravel trap but lost no positions. Button battled Verstappen for several laps before passing him for seventh on the 56th, as Trulli made a pit stop from fourth after his second set of tyres slowed him slightly and rejoined the track in fifth. From the 59th lap, Coulthard began to gain on Michael Schumacher, who slowed due to an oil pressure problem. He could not draw close enough to pass due to his gear selection problem, and Schumacher took his second victory of the season and the 37th of his career in a time of 1:31:35.271, averaging 200.404 km/h (124.525 mph) over a distance of 305.939 km (190.102 mi) and 71 laps. Coulthard followed 4 seconds later and Fisichella took third. Frentzen finished fourth after driving consistently, Trulli finished fifth with a two-stop strategy that allowed him to gain places with a lightly fuelled car early in the race, and Ralf Schumacher was the final points-scorer in sixth. Button, Verstappen, De la Rosa, Zonta and Mazzacane (in his first F1 race finish) were the final finishers. The attrition rate was high; only 11 of the 20 starters finished the race.

=== Post-race ===
The top three drivers appeared on the podium to collect their trophies and later spoke to the media at a press conference. Michael Schumacher, who received the winner's trophy from Brazilian footballer Pelé, said his pit stop strategy helped him to win: "In the past, as you may remember, we could not overtake the McLaren entries, regardless of their strategy. Now we are looking a lot more competitive – which is where we wanted to be – and the season could hardly have started better than it has." Coulthard stated that his second-place finish gave him a start on his championship campaign following gearbox issues: "It must have been entertaining for those who had places to watch at the first corner. Given the circumstances, I am very happy with my six points." Fisichella revealed that his car understeered and oversteered for the first 15 laps until its grip and balance improved. Nonetheless, he expressed satisfaction at finishing third: "This is a great result and will help us to be even more competitive in the future. I am confident about the next race when we will have some new aerodynamic parts."

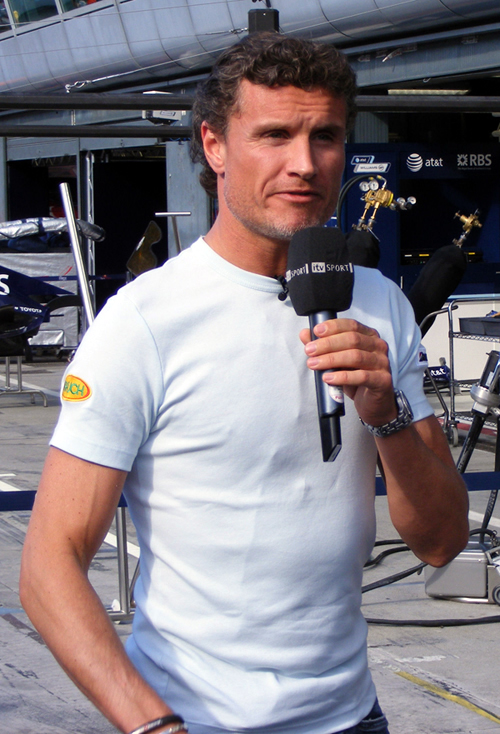
David Coulthard (pictured in 2007) was disqualified from the second place due to an illegal front wing endplate on his car.

Approximately one hour after the race, when the cars were subjected to post-race checks at the FIA scrutineering bay by officials, all of the top six finishers, except Fisichella, were found to have excess wear on the wooden planks attached to the floors underneath their cars, in violation of a regulation concerning illegal plank wear. The Ferrari, McLaren, Jordan, and Williams teams had a successful appeal because the bumpy racing surface caused wear from cars bottoming out. All four teams were reinstated after a second inspection caused a 3 1/2 hour delay. During the inspection, FIA technical delegate Jo Bauer discovered that Coulthard's front wing endplates were 43 mm (4.3 cm) above the ground (7 mm (0.28 in) too low) rather than 50 mm (5.0 cm) above a line of reference below a car as required by the FIA regulations. Bauer determined that this gave Coulthard a competitive aerodynamic advantage and the stewards disqualified him six hours later. Adrian Newey, McLaren's technical director, rejected the stewards' offer to transport Coulthard's car to Paris for a fair hearing and instead agreed to a set of four measurements in São Paulo. McLaren filed an appeal, claiming that vibrations from the bumpy racing surface damaged and shifted the car's undertray and chassis. A five-man panel heard the appeal on 4 April at a meeting of the FIA International Court of Appeal in Paris. In a 90-minute hearing, they rejected McLaren's appeal and declared the race result final.

This promoted every driver behind Coulthard one position; Button was reclassified sixth and became the youngest driver to score a Formula One World Championship point at the age of 20 years, 2 months, 7 days, breaking Ricardo Rodríguez's record from the 1962 Belgian Grand Prix. (Note: The current holder of this record is Max Verstappen who finished seventh at the 2015 Malaysian Grand Prix at 17 years, 166 days old.) The Brazilian Grand Prix organisers were summoned to a meeting of the FIA General Assembly on 6 April. They were fined $100,000 for the track's safety issues and the three times qualifying was stopped for falling advertising hoardings. The governing body ruled it "exceptional circumstances" and allowed the track to remain in Formula One. The FIA's president, Max Mosley, said that no increased fine or race cancellation were imposed because the organisers provided evidence to prevent either action from occurring: "Bearing in mind that we allowed the Brazilian promoters to place the signs there – and they probably didn't know what potential there was for the failures which occurred – it seemed only fair to impose the comparatively modest penalty."

Häkkinen limited his media interviews and left the track before the race ended. He expressed his disappointment at having to retire from the race's lead, "Nothing can describe how I feel, We have been quick all weekend, right the way through, so I am not happy to be leaving Brazil without any points. We have some work to do before the start of the European season." Button was quoted in the press as saying that he would rather score points in the race than a court of appeal, "I heard the news about David as I was making my way to the airport to fly back from Brazil – and I can't say it gave me any great feeling of joy. You want to earn any success through your driving skills, not someone else's misfortune." Eddie Jordan, the Jordan team owner, said that both his cars finishing the event demonstrated they could last a full race distance after retiring from the Australian Grand Prix with mechanical issues. According to Frentzen, the team's season had begun in Brazil and required maintenance to improve their performance, "But we are a very strong team with a good atmosphere, I get along well with Jarno and everything is fine so far."

After the race, Michael Schumacher led the World Drivers' Championship by 12 championship points, with Fisichella moving from fifth to second after finishing second. Ralf Schumacher dropped to fourth, while Barrichello fell to third and Frentzen was fifth. In the World Constructors' Championship, Ferrari increased its lead to 26 championship points, while Benetton advanced from fourth to second. Jordan's first championship points of the season put them third, while Williams and BAR were fourth and fifth with 15 races remaining.

=== Race classification ===
Drivers who scored championship points are denoted in bold.

Pos.	No.	Driver	Constructor	Laps	Time/Retired	Grid	Points
1	3	(Germany) **Michael Schumacher**	**Ferrari**	71	1:31:35.271	3	10
2	11	(Italy) **Giancarlo Fisichella**	**Benetton-Playlife**	71	+39.898	5	6
3	5	(Germany) **Heinz-Harald Frentzen**	**Jordan-Mugen-Honda**	71	+42.268	7	4
4	6	(Italy) **Jarno Trulli**	**Jordan-Mugen-Honda**	71	+1:12.780	12	3
5	9	(Germany) **Ralf Schumacher**	**Williams-BMW**	70	+1 Lap	11	2
6	10	(United Kingdom) **Jenson Button**	**Williams-BMW**	70	+1 Lap	9	1
7	19	(Netherlands) Jos Verstappen	Arrows-Supertec	70	+1 Lap	14	
8	18	(Spain) Pedro de la Rosa	Arrows-Supertec	70	+1 Lap	16	
9	23	(Brazil) Ricardo Zonta	BAR-Honda	69	+2 Laps	8	
10	21	(Argentina) Gastón Mazzacane	Minardi-Fondmetal	69	+2 Laps	20	
Ret	8	(United Kingdom) Johnny Herbert	Jaguar-Cosworth	51	Gearbox	17	
Ret	20	(Spain) Marc Gené	Minardi-Fondmetal	31	Engine	18	
Ret	1	(Finland) Mika Häkkinen	McLaren-Mercedes	30	Oil pressure	1	
Ret	4	(Brazil) Rubens Barrichello	Ferrari	27	Hydraulics	4	
Ret	7	(United Kingdom) Eddie Irvine	Jaguar-Cosworth	20	Spun off	6	
Ret	22	(Canada) Jacques Villeneuve	BAR-Honda	16	Gearbox	10	
Ret	14	(France) Jean Alesi	Prost-Peugeot	11	Electrical	15	
Ret	15	(Germany) Nick Heidfeld	Prost-Peugeot	9	Engine	19	
Ret	12	(Austria) Alexander Wurz	Benetton-Playlife	6	Engine	13	
DSQ	2	(United Kingdom) David Coulthard	McLaren-Mercedes	71	Illegal front wing endplates (+4.302)^{1}	2	
DNS	16	(Brazil) Pedro Diniz	Sauber-Petronas	0	Safety concerns^{2}	—	
DNS	17	(Finland) Mika Salo	Sauber-Petronas	0	Safety concerns^{2}	—	

Notes:

- **^1** – David Coulthard finished second but was disqualified for an illegal front wing endplate.
- **^2** – Sauber withdrew Pedro Diniz and Mika Salo on the grounds of safety due to separate rear wing failures on their cars.

== Championship standings after the race ==
Drivers' Championship standings

+/–	Pos	Driver	Points
	1	(Germany) Michael Schumacher	20
3	2	(Italy) Giancarlo Fisichella	8
1	3	(Brazil) Rubens Barrichello	6
1	4	(Germany) Ralf Schumacher	6
8	5	(Germany) Heinz-Harald Frentzen	4

Constructors' Championship standings

+/–	Pos	Constructor	Points
	1	(Italy) Ferrari	26
2	2	(Italy) Benetton-Playlife	8
5	3	(Republic of Ireland) Jordan-Mugen-Honda	7
2	4	(United Kingdom) Williams-BMW	7
2	5	(United Kingdom) BAR-Honda	4
Sources:

- Note: Only the top five positions are included for both sets of standings.

== Notes and references ==
=== References ===
Previous race: 2000 Australian Grand Prix	FIA Formula One World Championship; 2000 season	Next race: 2000 San Marino Grand Prix
Previous race: 1999 Brazilian Grand Prix	Brazilian Grand Prix	Next race: 2001 Brazilian Grand Prix
