= 2001 Brazilian Grand Prix =

Coordinates: 23°42′13″S 46°41′59″W

Race 3 of 17 in the 2001 Formula One World Championship
← Previous race	Next race →

Race details
- Date: April 1, 2001
- Official name: Grande Prêmio Marlboro do Brasil 2001
- Location: Autódromo José Carlos Pace, São Paulo, Brazil
- Course: Permanent racing facility
- Course length: 4.309 km (2.677 miles)
- Distance: 71 laps, 305.909 km (190.083 miles)
- Weather: Dry first, rain and thunderstorms later
- Attendance: 70,000

Pole position
Driver	(Germany) Michael Schumacher	Ferrari
- Time: 1:13.780

Fastest lap
Driver	(Germany) Ralf Schumacher	Williams-BMW
- Time: 1:15.693 on lap 38

Podium
First	(United Kingdom) David Coulthard	McLaren-Mercedes
Second	(Germany) Michael Schumacher	Ferrari
Third	(Germany) Nick Heidfeld	Sauber-Petronas

The 2001 Brazilian Grand Prix (formally the Grande Prêmio Marlboro do Brasil 2001) was a Formula One motor race held before 70,000 spectators on 1 April 2001 at the Autódromo José Carlos Pace in São Paulo, Brazil. It was the third race of the 2001 Formula One World Championship and the only one held in South America. Starting from fifth place, McLaren driver David Coulthard won the 71-lap race. Ferrari's Michael Schumacher finished second with Sauber's Nick Heidfeld third.

Michael Schumacher led the World Drivers' Championship before the race, while Ferrari led the World Constructors' Championship. He secured pole position by setting the quickest lap in the one-hour qualifying session. The race was interrupted after McLaren's Mika Häkkinen's engine stalled on the starting grid, prompting the safety car's deployment. When the safety car was withdrawn at the end of lap two, Williams' Juan Pablo Montoya overtook Schumacher for the lead. Montoya led the next 36 laps before he was hit by Arrows' Jos Verstappen on lap 39, forcing both drivers to retire from the race. As a result, Coulthard took the race lead and held it until the pit stops for wet-weather tyres, when the rain became heavier, and Schumacher took it for two laps until Coulthard passed him on lap 50. Coulthard led the rest of the race and won by 16.1 seconds over Schumacher, the only other driver on the lead lap.

Coulthard's tenth victory of his career reduced Michael Schumacher's lead in the World Drivers' Championship to six championship points along with him moving up to second place, 10 championship points ahead of Schumacher's teammate Rubens Barrichello in third. McLaren cut Ferrari's World Constructors' Championship lead to 15 championship points with 14 races remaining in the season.

== Background ==
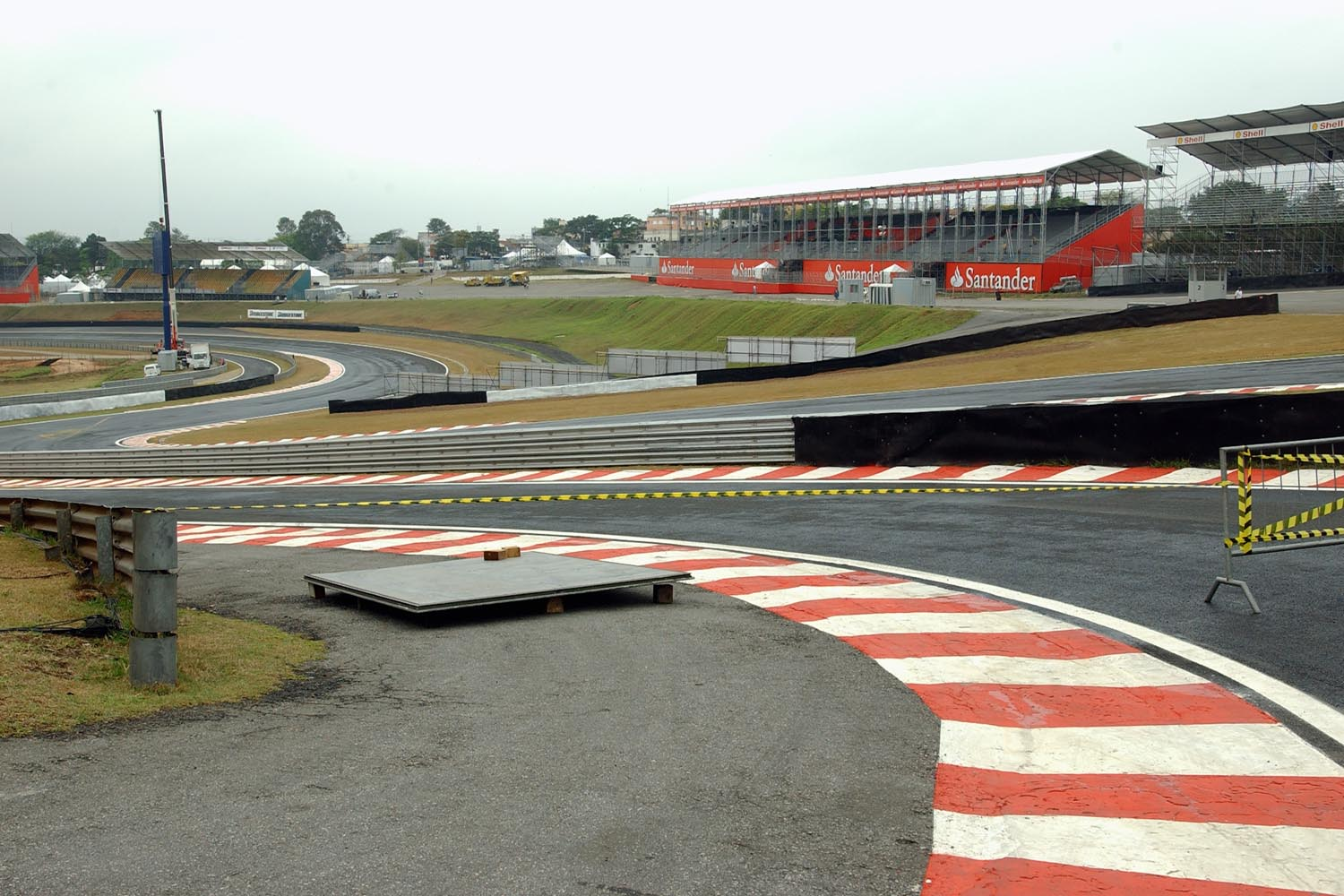
The Autódromo José Carlos Pace (pictured in 2006), where the race was held

The 2001 Brazilian Grand Prix, the third round of seventeen in the 2001 Formula One World Championship, took place on 1 April 2001, at the anti-clockwise Autódromo José Carlos Pace track in São Paulo, Brazil. It was the season's lone South American event, and the third in a row outside of Europe. The Grand Prix featured eleven teams of two drivers (each representing a different constructor), with no changes to the season entry list. Tyre suppliers Bridgestone and Michelin brought two dry compounds and three wet-weather tyres to Brazil.

Going into the race, Ferrari's Michael Schumacher led the World Drivers' Championship with 20 championship points, ahead of teammate Rubens Barrichello and McLaren's David Coulthard, who were tied for second with ten championship points. Jordan's Heinz-Harald Frentzen was fourth with five championship points, followed by Sauber's Nick Heidfeld in fifth with three. Ferrari led the World Constructors' Championship with 30 championship points, while McLaren were second with 11. Jordan and Sauber were third and fourth, with five and four championship points, respectively, and Williams were fifth with two.

Following the Malaysian Grand Prix on March 18, nine of the eleven teams tested tyres, car and electrical components, and racing setups on their cars at Spain's Circuit de Catalunya from 20 to 23 March in preparation for the Brazilian Grand Prix. Ferrari test driver Luca Badoer set the quickest times on the first day, ahead of McLaren's test driver Alexander Wurz. Badoer remained fastest on the second day. Marc Gené, the Williams test driver, stopped on track with a mechanical failure which briefly stopped testing. Michael Schumacher was fastest on the third day of testing. Seven suspensions were required as several drivers had car problems or spun off the circuit. Michael Schumacher stayed fastest for the final day's running. Both the Minardi and Sauber teams did not do any testing. Sauber's technical department focused on preparing updated aerodynamic components that were optimised at the factory, whereas Minardi worked at their factory to improve car reliability.

Michael Schumacher won the season's first two races in Australia and Malaysia. Although he was the bookmakers' favourite to win the race, he noted that the warm weather could make it difficult for drivers and their cars, adding, "We have proven the car's reliability in two tough races right at the start of the season, which is encouraging going into the Brazilian race". Barrichello did not remember a time he was very excited for a race because of his Ferrari's competitiveness, and was certain of beating his teammate Michael Schumacher to win, saying, "I know what it would mean to the fans especially to see a home winner." McLaren co-ordinator Jo Ramírez admitted "We were and we are still lost" because their car was slower than Ferrari's in the first two rounds, "Frankly, I don't know what we will be able to do at this Grand Prix. We are lost. This car is not up to the McLaren tradition." McLaren's Mika Häkkinen stated that winning in Brazil was his team's primary goal, while teammate Coulthard expressed hope that they could maintain its history of success in Brazil.

Following last year's race, the track underwent safety upgrades. In response to marshal Graham Beveridge's death at the Australian race, 21 cabins were erected to safeguard marshals across the track. Animals that were roaming near the circuit boundaries were rounded up and relocated. A guard rail was constructed at the Bico do Pato turn as car speeds increased greatly since 2000. The gravel trap along the Reta Oposta straight was reinforced and the circuit's drainage system was fixed. On 17 March, a contractor's dissatisfaction with São Paulo city administration caused a disruption in the renovation work, prompting inquiries. Construction workers continued to work on the track prior to the first practice session. The issue, involving the delayed supply of tables and chairs, was confirmed by race organisers and would not disrupt the Grand Prix. Barrichello criticised the Grand Prix, citing the displeasure of some drivers in previous years and the quality of the local facilities. However, the event's director, Carlos Roberto Montagne, refuted Barrichello's assertions, saying that the road surface was approved by two British engineers. However, the drivers were dissatisfied with the work because the track remained bumpy. Häkkinen described the track as "very bumpy indeed. It seems to get worse and worse every year." Minardi's Fernando Alonso claimed that the bumping was so bad that one could have lost their vision of the circuit.

Several teams introduced no significant technical changes to their cars, instead waiting for the season's first European race, the San Marino Grand Prix, two weeks after the race in Brazil. McLaren introduced four front wing specifications in an attempt to reduce the MP4-16's understeer but eventually oriented on a new front wing profile. Williams debuted a new rear wing, while Benetton postponed the debut of its lower front side appendages to the San Marino Grand Prix due to creating drag and downforce, slowing their B201 car during practice. British American Racing (BAR) tested two rear wing configurations and a modified upswept exhaust to increase the 003's engine revolutions while avoiding gearbox overheating. Sauber added two new sidepod winglets in front of the air extractor chimneys to increase downforce as Jaguar lowered the size of the R2's bargeboards and extended the front wing endplates to improve efficiency and deflect air inside the front wheels. Prost added updated aerodynamic profiles to the AP04's front wishbones as well as minor rear suspension geometry modifications.

== Practice ==
The race was preceded by four practice sessions, two one-hour sessions on Friday and two 45-minute sessions on Saturday. The first morning practice session was held in sunny weather on a dusty track that was cleaned by cars; no rain was expected. Michael Schumacher led the first practice session, setting a lap of 1:16.832 with 23 minutes left. Häkkinen was second and was fastest for the first quarter of the practice until spinning off midway through after likely driving onto dirt rather than a lack of car grip. Barrichello, Coulthard, BAR's Olivier Panis, the Jaguars of Eddie Irvine and Luciano Burti, Williams' Juan Pablo Montoya, Heidfeld and Jordan's Jarno Trulli rounded out the session's top ten fastest drivers.

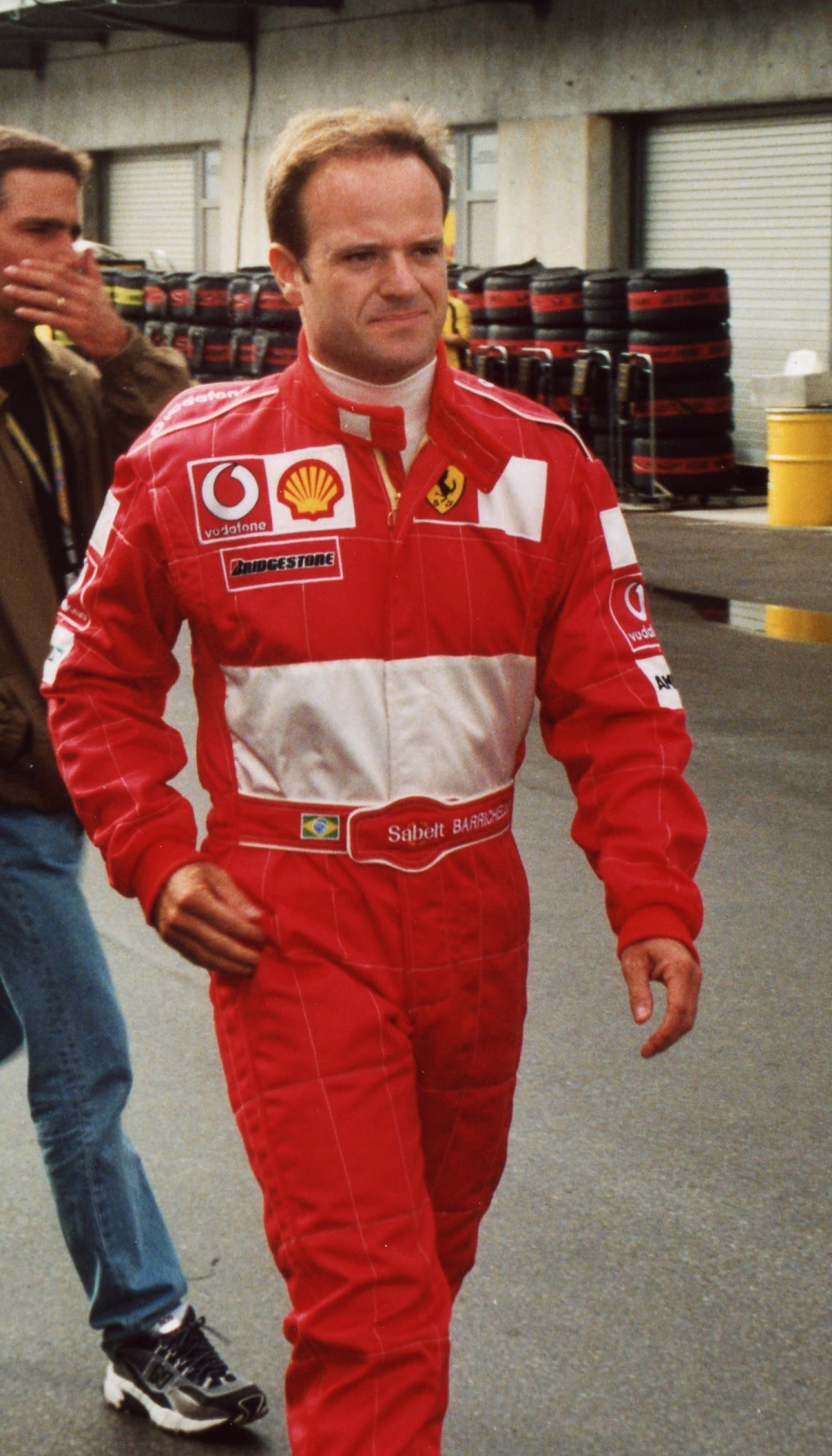
Rubens Barrichello (pictured in 2002) had a loss of oil pressure that meant he had a lack of preparation on his car.

It became warmer but overcast for the second practice session. Early in the session, Coulthard set the day's fastest lap of 1:15.520 on new tyres, one second quicker than Trulli. He tried to lap faster but missed the braking point for Curva do Sol corner and spun into the gravel trap. Michael Schumacher was third after suffering a puncture from driving over a nail. Montoya and Ralf Schumacher of Williams (who ran off the track at turn ten, damaging his car's front aerodynamic devices) were fourth and sixth, separated by Häkkinen. Barrichello, seventh, spun off after 22 minutes after his engine lost power due to a loss of oil pressure and stalled. Because the sporting regulations prohibited him from driving the backup car, Barrichello had insufficient on-track driving to set up his car for the race. Frentzen (who stopped on track at Subida do Lago corner when his engine suddenly cut out with more than 20 minutes remaining), Heidfeld and Irvine followed in the top ten.

It got hotter during Saturday's free practice sessions. Häkkinen led the third practice session, lapping at 1:14.503, with teammate Coulthard second. Michael Schumacher and Barrichello were third and fifth fastest, followed by Ralf Schumacher. Montoya, Trulli, Frentzen, Heidfeld, and Sauber's Kimi Räikkönen completed the top ten. Burti lost control of his Jaguar but recovered to continue driving. Giancarlo Fisichella's Benetton car stopped in the grass due to an engine oil leak.

In the final practice session, Montoya was quickest with a lap of 1:13.963, lapping faster than the 2000 pole time; Ralf Schumacher was fourth. The two McLarens split them, with Häkkinen in second and Coulthard in third. Michael Schumacher was fifth, ahead of Frentzen, Barrichello, Räikkönen, Panis and Heidfeld. Frentzen's engine failed before the pit lane on his final lap of the session and marshals moved his car into the pit lane, smoke billowing from the rear. BAR's Jacques Villeneuve and Irvine stopped their cars close to each other in the grass with gearbox hydraulic trouble.

== Qualifying ==
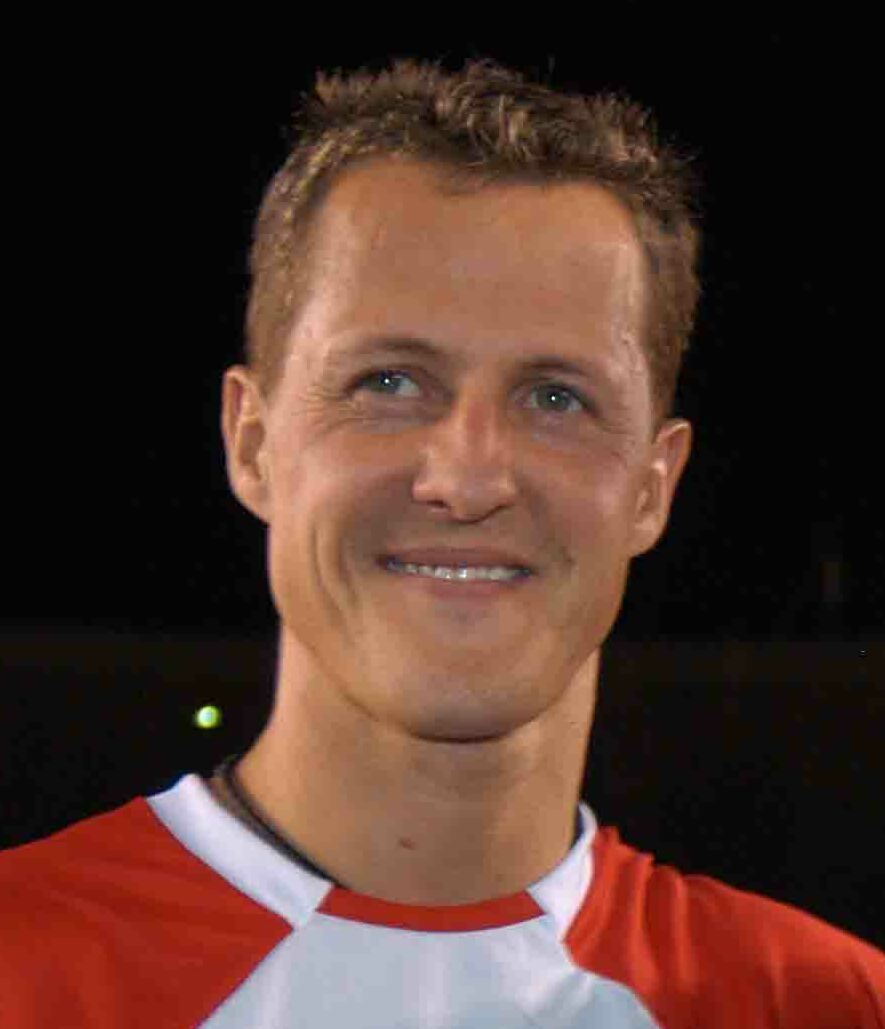
Michael Schumacher (pictured in 2005) qualified on pole position for the seventh successive Grand Prix.

Each driver was limited to twelve laps during Saturday's one-hour qualifying session, with the starting order determined by their fastest laps. The 107% rule was in force during this session, which required each driver to set a time within 107% of the fastest lap to qualify for the race. Qualifying was contested in hot, sunny weather with no rain forecast, stopping the top teams from lapping faster near the end of the session. The pole lap was only three-tenths of a second faster than the 2000 race due to track resurfacing, deterioration, and caution from both tyre suppliers due to an abrasive, bumpy surface and the circuit's several high-speed turns. After aborting his second run because it was too slow following an error that put him wide at turn four, Michael Schumacher clinched his seventh straight pole position and the 35th of his career with a time of 1:13.780 with 16 minutes left, moving him to one pole away from equalling Ayrton Senna's record of eight consecutive poles set between 1988 and 1989. He was joined on the front row by Ralf Schumacher, who qualified 0.310 seconds slower despite reporting a tough vehicle to drive, equaling his team's best qualifying position since the 1998 Italian Grand Prix. They became the first siblings to share the front row of a Formula One World Championship event. Häkkinen and Coulthard took third and fifth, respectively. Both drivers agreed that their cars were less inclined to understeer, and their first runs were hampered by Montoya spinning off the track. Coulthard's first run was ended early due to Villeneuve slowing him at Junção corner. Part of his car's undertray was damaged on the banking going onto the pit lane straight. Montoya separated the McLaren duo in fourth, having lost control of the rear of his Williams car at the fast left-hand Mergulho corner and collided with the tyre barrier on the far side of the track on his first quick lap. Montoya was unhurt, and returned to the pit lane, where the mechanics set up the spare car for him for the rest of qualifying.

Barrichello was four tenths of a second slower than Michael Schumacher in sixth, claiming excess understeer for handling issues on new tyres. The two Jordans were upgraded with race-specification engines between the final practice session and qualifying, with Trulli qualifying seventh and Frentzen eighth; the latter was the last driver to be within a second of the pole lap and had to abort his third run due to the presence of a slower car. This formation continued onto the fifth row, occupied by Sauber's Heidfeld and Räikkönen, with the former changing his set-up to move ahead of his teammate. The BARs of Panis and Villeneuve occupied the sixth row, and both drivers complained of a lack of grip in the slow-speed turns; Panis spun early in qualifying, and Villeneuve struck the kerb on the inside of turn eight, losing control of his car on his first run. Irvine and Burti (after an error that cost him two-tenths of a second from the final turn to the finish line) were 13th and 14th in their Jaguars in the final ten minutes of qualifying when the track was cooler and their car balances improved, ahead of Jean Alesi in the faster of the two Prosts after a car imbalance exacerbated by excess oversteer. Enrique Bernoldi took 16th for the Arrows team, ahead of teammate Jos Verstappen, who changed his car's setup in practice to try to remove understeer but ended up with oversteer in qualifying. Benetton's Fisichella and Jenson Button took 18th and 20th, respectively, due to engine oil leaks and poor car balance; Button had a minor oversteer issue at the end of qualifying. They were separated by Alonso in the quicker Minardi, who believed he could have qualified ahead of Fisichella if not for slower traffic on an aborted final run. Prost's Gastón Mazzacane, who like his teammate Alesi had an imbalanced car, took 21st. Minardi's Tarso Marques, 22nd, had an engine change that prevented his team from knowing his car's qualifying setup.

=== Post-qualifying ===
After the session, scrutineers examined Ralf Schumacher's car for a fuel irregularity since the first sample of allowed fuel differed from that approved by the Fédération Internationale de l'Automobile (FIA; Formula One's governing body). Williams, the FIA's technical delegate, and the FIA's fuel analyst agreed to test a second sample and the stewards permitted Ralf Schumacher to start the race from second rather than last after the fuel was declared legal later that night.

=== Qualifying classification ===
Pos	No	Driver	Constructor	Lap	Gap	Grid
1	1	(Germany) Michael Schumacher	Ferrari	1:13.780	—	1
2	5	(Germany) Ralf Schumacher	Williams-BMW	1:14.090	+0.310	2
3	3	(Finland) Mika Häkkinen	McLaren-Mercedes	1:14.122	+0.342	3
4	6	(Colombia) Juan Pablo Montoya	Williams-BMW	1:14.165	+0.385	4
5	4	(United Kingdom) David Coulthard	McLaren-Mercedes	1:14.178	+0.398	5
6	2	(Brazil) Rubens Barrichello	Ferrari	1:14.191	+0.411	6
7	12	(Italy) Jarno Trulli	Jordan-Honda	1:14.630	+0.850	7
8	11	(Germany) Heinz-Harald Frentzen	Jordan-Honda	1:14.633	+0.853	8
9	16	(Germany) Nick Heidfeld	Sauber-Petronas	1:14.810	+1.030	9
10	17	(Finland) Kimi Räikkönen	Sauber-Petronas	1:14.924	+1.144	10
11	9	(France) Olivier Panis	BAR-Honda	1:15.046	+1.266	11
12	10	(Canada) Jacques Villeneuve	BAR-Honda	1:15.180	+1.400	12
13	18	(United Kingdom) Eddie Irvine	Jaguar-Cosworth	1:15.192	+1.412	13
14	19	(Brazil) Luciano Burti	Jaguar-Cosworth	1:15.371	+1.591	14
15	22	(France) Jean Alesi	Prost-Acer	1:15.437	+1.657	15
16	15	(Brazil) Enrique Bernoldi	Arrows-Asiatech	1:15.657	+1.877	16
17	14	(Netherlands) Jos Verstappen	Arrows-Asiatech	1:15.704	+1.924	17
18	7	(Italy) Giancarlo Fisichella	Benetton-Renault	1:16.175	+2.395	18
19	21	(Spain) Fernando Alonso	Minardi-European	1:16.184	+2.404	19
20	8	(United Kingdom) Jenson Button	Benetton-Renault	1:16.229	+2.449	20
21	23	(Argentina) Gastón Mazzacane	Prost-Acer	1:16.520	+2.740	21
22	20	(Brazil) Tarso Marques	Minardi-European	1:16.784	+3.004	22
107% time: 1:18.945

== Warm-up ==
A 30-minute warm-up session was held on the morning of the race to give teams a final opportunity to check and modify their cars before the race. Both Ferraris were running quickly throughout warm-up, with Michael Schumacher setting the fastest time of 1:15.971, the only lap time below 1:16, with a full tank of fuel and an old set of tyres. He also drove his race car and Ferrari's spare car during warm-up. Barrichello and Häkkinen were second and third, respectively. Ralf Schumacher was fourth, setting a lap four tenths of a second slower than Michael Schumacher. With five minutes remaining, Alonso went into the gravel trap and his car rested in the tyre barriers, breaking his front wing. Alonso was unhurt but the yellow flags were waved.

== Race ==
The 71-lap race started before 70,000 spectators at 14:00 local time, in dry conditions but dark, grey clouds had built up over the track. The air temperature was 30 °C (86 °F) and the track temperature ranged from 36 and 40 °C (97 and 104 °F); a 50% probability of rain was forecast. On a pre-race reconnaissance lap, Barrichello had to stop his Ferrari on the grass at the far side of the track because of an oil pressure fault caused by a fuel pump failure. He returned to the pit lane to drive the spare car that was set up for his teammate Michael Schumacher and had its settings adjusted for him. Irvine's mechanics had difficulty starting his car's engine while stationary on the grid, and they did not removed their garage equipment from the track by the 15-second mark, signalling the start of the formation lap. He received a ten-second stop-and-go penalty and Jaguar summoned him to serve the penalty in the pit lane on lap six.

When the race started, Häkkinen aimed his car to the left and moved slightly before the five-red light sequence was completed. He then released the clutch too early because of the way it was set up and stalled the engine. Häkkinen raised his hands to inform the 18 drivers behind him, who were able to avoid colliding into his car and cause a major accident; he was so upset that he forgot to properly reattach the steering wheel, a violation of the sporting regulations. The track layout prevented marshals from moving Häkkinen's car off the main straight into a gap in the pit lane wall, forcing them to push it forward. This, along with the circuit's short length, caused the safety car's deployment. Before that, Montoya had risen from fourth to second, while Ralf Schumacher had fallen from second to fifth due to a poor start in which he was overtaken on the inside by Coulthard at turn one and pushed down further by Trulli.

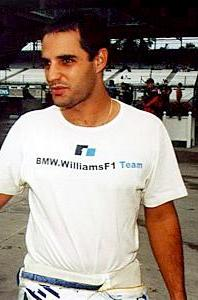
Juan Pablo Montoya (pictured in 2002) overtook Michael Schumacher for the race lead on lap three and held it for 36 laps until he was hit by Arrows' Jos Verstappen

Häkkinen's car was removed from the track by the end of the second lap, and the safety car was withdrawn. With limited distance to accelerate between the pit lane and the start/finish line, Montoya on cold tyres remained close behind Michael Schumacher. He used his more powerful engine to aggressively overtake Schumacher on the unclean inside line by braking later at the Senna S chicane for the race lead. Both drivers made contact and Montoya drove Michael Schumacher wide right onto the grass in the middle of the turn to take the lead into the Curva do Sol corner. On the second straight, Barrichello missed his braking point and collided with the rear of Ralf Schumacher's car, which had been pushed off the track by Trulli but had driven back to the right into Descida de Lago corner, removing Barrichello's front-left wheel and front wing, as well as Ralf Schumacher's rear wing. Barrichello spun out in the gravel trap and retired while Ralf Schumacher went to the pits for extensive rear-end repairs and fell four laps behind.

Montoya recorded a succession of fastest laps to open up a modest lead over Michael Schumacher, who was unable to pass due to Montoya's more powerful engine keeping him ahead on the straights and holding Schumacher off in the turns. Montoya had more fuel in his car than Michael Schumacher, and expected to lose grip on his tyres after the first few laps, but keeping ahead may mean greater grip after about six laps. Panis overtook Alesi, Räikkönen, and Heidfeld to move into seventh place from laps seven to nine. The leading three drivers in the race had already pulled away from the rest of the field, with Villeneuve and Frentzen battling for fifth. Villeneuve made an unplanned pit stop on lap 12. He thought he had a puncture, but BAR discovered a broken differential, resulting in loose handling throughout the race. This moved Panis to sixth place, where he competed with Frentzen for fifth. Panis overtook Frentzen on the inside for fifth on lap 15 and closed up to Trulli in fourth. Bernoldi was forced to retire on the following lap due to a gear selection fault caused by a hydraulic issue.

Panis moved into fourth place on lap 20 after passing Trulli at the first turn. Montoya increased his lead over Michael Schumacher to more than a second for the first time in the race on the 21st lap, while Coulthard was a second behind in third place because his team had altered his car to be suitable for a wet track because they expected rain later in the race. Alesi in ninth became the first driver on a two-stop strategy to make a scheduled pit stop on lap 24. His stop took 15 seconds longer than expected due to a refuelling rig issue that prevented fuel from entering the car. Ferrari, McLaren, and Williams had differing pit stop strategies: Ferrari planned two stops, while McLaren and Williams planned only one. Ferrari technical director Ross Brawn and race engineer Luca Baldisserri called Michael Schumacher into the pit lane on the following lap. His stop took 9.6 seconds and he rejoined the race in fifth place. On lap 28, Alonso retired in the pit lane due to an potentiometer failure in the throttle mechanism, which produced engine trouble.

Michael Schumacher braked later than Trulli at the first turn, passing him for fourth on lap 28 and moving up to third when Panis made a pit stop on the following lap. Even though he was not hampered, Michael Schumacher was not lapping faster than Montoya because he encountered slower cars, while Montoya was marginally pulling away from Coulthard in second. On the 31st lap, Burti retired in the pit lane to avoid an engine failure caused by a water seal problem. Light rain began to fall in the pit lane on lap 35. Four laps later, Montoya was approaching the battling duo of Fisichella and Verstappen. Verstappen pulled to the left on the Reta Oposta straight to allow Montoya to pass, then entered Montoya's slipstream to prevent Fisichella from attacking him. Despite both drivers braking sooner than usual, Verstappen hit the rear of Montoya's car in the braking area as they entered the Reta Oposto corner. Both drivers were unhurt, however they retired from the race due to the crash. This promoted Coulthard to the lead with Michael Schumacher second, Trulli third and Frentzen fourth.

The rain became more intense, and Coulthard made his only scheduled pit stop of the race on lap 40. His pit stop for fuel and tyres took 9.8 seconds, and he rejoined the track just ahead of Michael Schumacher. Despite Michael Schumacher's momentum and warmer tyres, Coulthard maintained the lead on his first lap out of the pit lane. Most drivers on a one-stop strategy intended to schedule their tyre changes when the rain came, but when they needed fuel, they had to switch to dry-compound tyres between laps 41 and 44. Rain began falling harder on lap 45, and most drivers made pit stops for wet-weather tyres, either intermediates or full-wets. Michael Schumacher made a pit stop for intermediate tyres on the following lap, however McLaren did not bring in Coulthard for the entire lap due to uncertainty about the weather, losing 13 seconds to the former. Coulthard made a pit stop for intermediate tyres on lap 47, ceding the lead to Michael Schumacher.

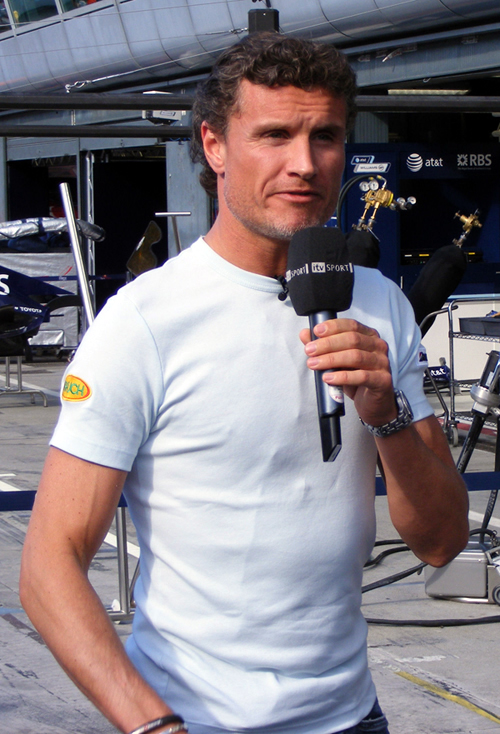
David Coulthard (pictured in 2007) took the tenth victory of his career

Michael Schumacher lost control of his Ferrari on lap 48 when a rear tyre hit a damp white line on the circuit's edge entering Descida do Lago corner. He regained control of his car but avoided stalling to maintain his lead. This driver error allowed Coulthard to close up to Michael Schumacher. Two laps later, coming around the banked last turn and into the Senna S chicane at the end of the straight, Coulthard and Michael Schumacher were about to lap Marques' slower car, with Coulthard slipstreaming Schumacher. Marques stayed in the middle of the track, allowing Coulthard to move to the inside and Michael Schumacher to the outside. Coulthard passed both drivers to retake the race lead and began to pull away from Michael Schumacher. Drivers on intermediate or full-wet tyres had variable lap times, and it was quite wet on parts of the course, with some areas hit by rain and others by sunshine.

Michael Schumacher lost time to Coulthard when he ran wide into the gravel trap at turn six on lap 53, but he remained in second. Irvine retired after getting his Jaguar trapped on a curb at turn five on the same lap. On lap 56, Mazzacane pulled to the side of the track near the turn one run-off area after his clutch burned out, resulting in a fire that marshals had to extinguish. Räikkönen in ninth lost control of his car after he was caught off guard by the rain, sliding backwards onto the grass and retiring on the following lap. On lap 60, Ralf Schumacher spun at turn five, stalled his car and retired. The fastest drivers managed to avoid Ralf Schumacher's stalled car before it was removed from the track. Heidfeld overtook Trulli in turn one for fourth on lap 61. Frentzen, in third, became the race's final retirement when he slowed and stopped his car at the side of the track with an electrical misfire two laps later. This promoted Heidfeld to third, Trulli to fourth, Panis to fifth and Alesi to sixth.

As the track began to dry, Fisichella placed pressure on Alesi, passing him on the outside for sixth place on lap 66. On the following lap, Panis passed Trulli on the inside into turn one. Coulthard slowed down in the final laps but maintained the lead to achieve his first win since the 2000 French Grand Prix and the tenth of his career. Michael Schumacher finished second, 16.1 seconds back and the only other driver on the lead lap. Heidfeld finished third for his first career podium and Sauber's first since the 1998 Belgian Grand Prix, despite a slow pit stop in which a fuel filler got stuck. Panis and Trulli finished fourth and fifth, despite major delays in pit stops for wet-weather tyres. Fisichella ran a reliable race and was the final point-scorer in sixth. Villeneuve was off the pace and finished seventh, followed by Alesi and Marques. Button was the final finisher after a pit stop on lap 28 to rectify an oil leak caused by the scavenge pump failing to evacuate enough oil, reducing engine power. There were 11 classified finishers out of 22 starters, but 10 were running when the race ended.

=== Post-race ===
The top three drivers appeared on the podium to collect their trophies and spoke to the media in the subsequent press conference. Coulthard admitted to being fortunate due to Montoya's pace but he believed he and McLaren could still compete in rainy weather. He described ending Ferrari's streak of six successive wins as "very important" and expressed satisfaction with winning the Grand Prix. Michael Schumacher stated that he was hoping for a wet track despite the lack of exact estimates about when the rain would arrive, but noted that his car did not work as he had hoped, resulting in driver errors. Heidfeld described his first career podium finish as "incredible for me" and praised Sauber for their efforts, adding, "it's really hard for me to realise right now because to be out on the podium, it is amazing." He added that finishing on the podium was the anomaly in 2001 but he wanted to try to return to the top three as often as possible.

Mercedes-Benz motorsport head Norbert Haug welcomed Coulthard's victory as "a turning point" and praised the driver, stating, "He showed what he is really capable of by beating Michael Schumacher in extremely difficult conditions. We have always believed in him but up to now he did not have the best car." The stewards fined Verstappen $15,000 for colliding with Montoya, which eliminated both drivers from the race. Montoya described the collision as "strange" because he said he braked where he did during the race and assumed Verstappen hit him because he braked too late. Verstappen felt "very sorry" for Montoya after learning he was the race leader but insisted he could not avoid him. He added that he did not purposefully cause the accident and personally apologised to Montoya. Williams technical director Patrick Head argued that Verstappen should have taken sole responsibility for the accident. Arrows later withdrew an appeal of Verstappen's fine.

The stewards summoned Barrichello and Ralf Schumacher after their third lap accident, which was their second in two weeks following the Malaysian Grand Prix. They deemed it "a racing incident" and cautioned both drivers over their future conduct. Barrichello argued Ralf Schumacher changed his line after passing another driver and insisted he did not apply the brakes later than usual. Ralf Schumacher accused Barrichello of initiating the collision, adding, "If you drive like that these things come back on you one day." Three-time world champion Niki Lauda felt Barrichello should have received a two-race ban for his involvement in a recent series of accidents. Brawn defended Barrichello, commenting, "Two people go for a corner, and it takes two people to have an incident. Ralf has been involved in an incident at every race this year – you can be in the wrong place at the wrong time. I gather it was just a racing incident."

Häkkinen was fined $5,000 for leaving his McLaren on the starting grid without the steering wheel attached. He did not attribute blame for his first lap stall, "I do not want to start making any excuses. The car just wasn't able to move because it stalled." Prost blamed a jammed fuel rig for preventing Alesi from scoring the team's first championship points since September 1999, and the issue was reported to the FIA due to the flammability of Formula One fuel and the associated safety concerns. Fisichella heralded his sixth-place finish as a "perfect" outcome for him and Benetton, something he had not anticipated. Ferrari investigated their performance in the race and found that their vehicles were incorrectly set up and that the car lacked downforce.

Michael Schumacher retained his World Drivers' Championship lead with 26 championship points. Coulthard's win moved him from third to second, while Barrichello's retirement dropped him to third. Heidfeld's third-place finish elevated him to fourth while Frentzen dropped to fifth. Ferrari maintained its lead in the World Constructors' Championship, with 36 championship points. McLaren drew to within 15 championship points of Ferrari after Coulthard's victory. Sauber overtook Jordan for third while BAR moved to fifth with 14 rounds of the season remaining.

=== Race classification ===
Drivers who scored championship points are denoted in bold.

Pos	No	Driver	Constructor	Tyre	Laps	Time/Retired	Grid	Points
1	4	(United Kingdom) **David Coulthard**	**McLaren-Mercedes**	B	71	1:39:00.834	5	10
2	1	(Germany) **Michael Schumacher**	**Ferrari**	B	71	+16.164	1	6
3	16	(Germany) **Nick Heidfeld**	**Sauber-Petronas**	B	70	+1 Lap	9	4
4	9	(France) **Olivier Panis**	**BAR-Honda**	B	70	+1 Lap	11	3
5	12	(Italy) **Jarno Trulli**	**Jordan-Honda**	B	70	+1 Lap	7	2
6	7	(Italy) **Giancarlo Fisichella**	**Benetton-Renault**	M	70	+1 Lap	18	1
7	10	(Canada) Jacques Villeneuve	BAR-Honda	B	70	+1 Lap	12	
8	22	(France) Jean Alesi	Prost-Acer	M	70	+1 Lap	15	
9	20	(Brazil) Tarso Marques	Minardi-European	M	68	+3 Laps	22	
10	8	(United Kingdom) Jenson Button	Benetton-Renault	M	64	+7 Laps	20	
11	11	(Germany) Heinz-Harald Frentzen	Jordan-Honda	B	63	Electrical	8	
Ret	17	(Finland) Kimi Räikkönen	Sauber-Petronas	B	55	Spun off/Tyre	10	
Ret	5	(Germany) Ralf Schumacher	Williams-BMW	M	54	Spun off	2	
Ret	23	(Argentina) Gastón Mazzacane	Prost-Acer	M	54	Clutch	21	
Ret	18	(United Kingdom) Eddie Irvine	Jaguar-Cosworth	M	52	Spun off	13	
Ret	6	(Colombia) Juan Pablo Montoya	Williams-BMW	M	38	Collision damage	4	
Ret	14	(Netherlands) Jos Verstappen	Arrows-Asiatech	B	37	Collision	17	
Ret	19	(Brazil) Luciano Burti	Jaguar-Cosworth	M	30	Engine	14	
Ret	21	(Spain) Fernando Alonso	Minardi-European	M	25	Electrical	19	
Ret	15	(Brazil) Enrique Bernoldi	Arrows-Asiatech	B	15	Hydraulics	16	
Ret	2	(Brazil) Rubens Barrichello	Ferrari	B	2	Collision/Spun off	6	
Ret	3	(Finland) Mika Häkkinen	McLaren-Mercedes	B	0	Stalled/Gearbox	3	

== Championship standings after the race ==
Drivers' Championship standings

+/–	Pos	Driver	Points
	1	(Germany) Michael Schumacher	26
1	2	(United Kingdom) David Coulthard	20
1	3	(Brazil) Rubens Barrichello	10
1	4	(Germany) Nick Heidfeld	7
1	5	(Germany) Heinz-Harald Frentzen	5

Constructors' Championship standings

+/–	Pos	Constructor	Points
	1	(Italy) Ferrari	36
	2	(United Kingdom) McLaren-Mercedes	21
1	3	(Switzerland) Sauber-Petronas	8
1	4	(Republic of Ireland) Jordan-Honda	7
3	5	(United Kingdom) BAR-Honda	3
Sources:

- Note: Only the top five positions are included for both sets of standings.

Previous race: 2001 Malaysian Grand Prix	FIA Formula One World Championship; 2001 season	Next race: 2001 San Marino Grand Prix
Previous race: 2000 Brazilian Grand Prix	Brazilian Grand Prix	Next race: 2002 Brazilian Grand Prix
