= 2001 San Marino Grand Prix =

Coordinates: 44°20′38″N 11°43′00″E

Race 4 of 17 in the 2001 Formula One World Championship
← Previous race	Next race →

Race details
- Date: 15 April 2001
- Official name: Gran Premio Warsteiner di San Marino 2001
- Location: Autodromo Enzo e Dino Ferrari, Imola, Emilia-Romagna, Italy
- Course: Permanent racing facility
- Course length: 4.933 km (3.065 miles)
- Distance: 62 laps, 305.846 km (190.044 miles)
- Weather: Sunny. Air Temp: 14 °C (57 °F), Track 26 °C (79 °F)
- Attendance: 80,000–100,000

Pole position
Driver	(United Kingdom) David Coulthard	McLaren-Mercedes
- Time: 1:23.054

Fastest lap
Driver	(Germany) Ralf Schumacher	Williams-BMW
- Time: 1:25.524 on lap 27

Podium
First	(Germany) Ralf Schumacher	Williams-BMW
Second	(United Kingdom) David Coulthard	McLaren-Mercedes
Third	(Brazil) Rubens Barrichello	Ferrari

The 2001 San Marino Grand Prix (formally the Gran Premio Warsteiner di San Marino 2001) was a Formula One motor race held before between 80,000 and 100,000 spectators at the Autodromo Enzo e Dino Ferrari, Imola, Emilia-Romagna, Italy on 15 April 2001. It was the fourth race of the 2001 Formula One World Championship and the 21st San Marino Grand Prix. Williams's Ralf Schumacher won the 62-lap race, starting from third. McLaren's David Coulthard finished second, and Ferrari's Rubens Barrichello finished third.

Going into the event, Ferrari's Michael Schumacher led the World Drivers' Championship from Coulthard while Ferrari led McLaren in the World Constructors' Championship. After setting the fastest lap in the one-hour qualifying session, Coulthard started the race on pole position alongside teammate Mika Häkkinen. Ralf Schumacher from third overtook both McLaren drivers into the Tamburello chicane and retained the lead for the entire race, taking his maiden victory and Williams's first since the 1997 Luxembourg Grand Prix; Coulthard ended 4.3 seconds back in second place. Barrichello finished third after switching from a two– to a one–pit stop strategy.

Coulthard's second-place finish put him in the joint lead of the World Drivers' Championship with Michael Schumacher, but Schumacher retained the lead overall because he had won two races to Coulthard's one despite retiring from the race. Barrichello was third, 12 championship points behind the two, but Ralf Schumacher's victory moved him from seventh to fourth. McLaren decreased Ferrari's World Constructors' Championship lead to ten championship points, while Williams moved from sixth to third with 13 races remaining in the season.

== Background ==
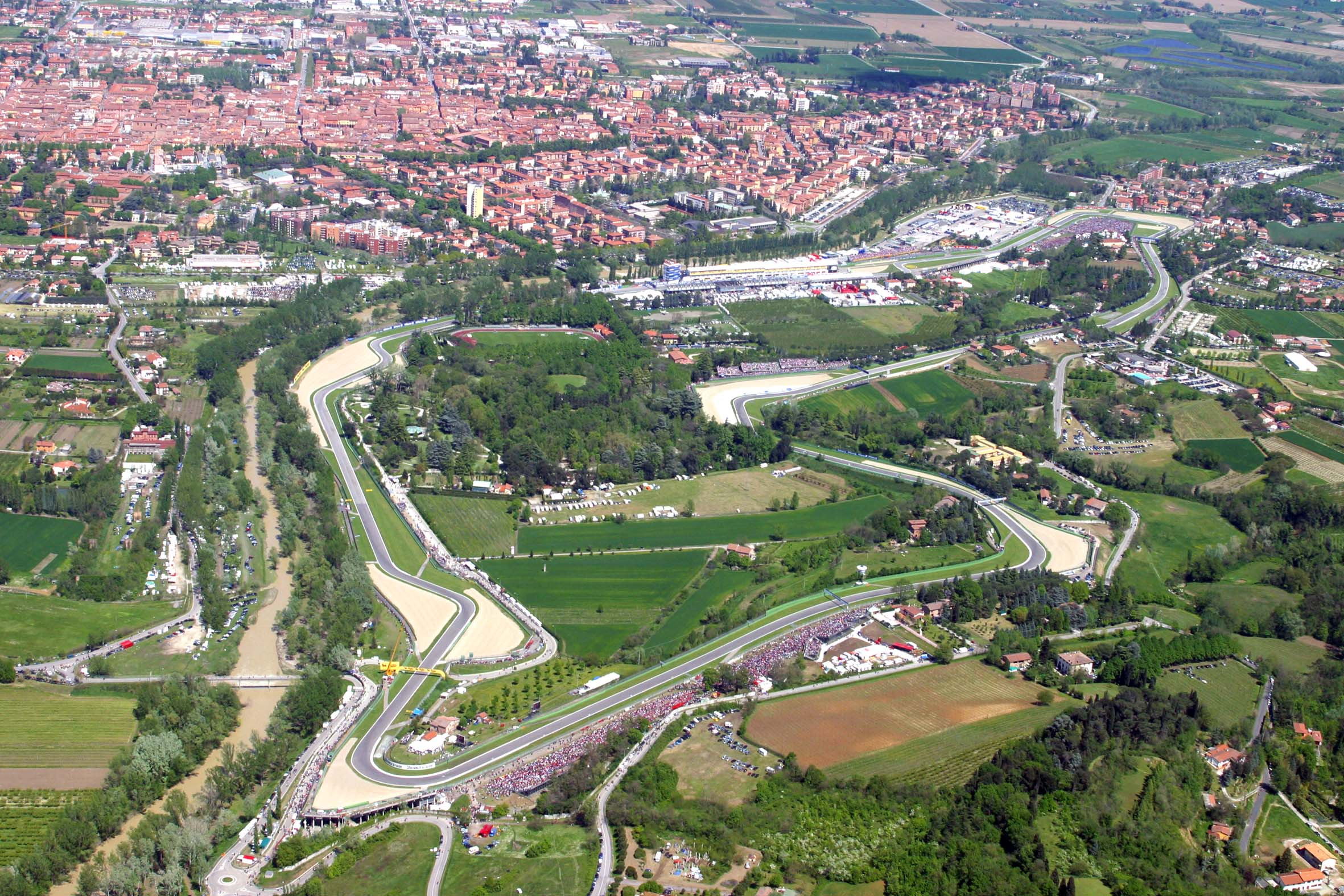
The Autodromo Enzo e Dino Ferrari (pictured in 2010), where the race was held

The 2001 San Marino Grand Prix was the race's 21st edition, the fourth of seventeen races in the 2001 Formula One World Championship, the season's first European round, and one of two in Italy. It was held on 15 April 2001 at the 17-turn, 4.933 km (3.065 mi) anti-clockwise Autodromo Enzo e Dino Ferrari in Imola, Emilia-Romagna, Italy, outside of San Marino which lacks the facilities to host Formula One races. There were eleven teams (each representing a different constructor) with two drivers each for the Grand Prix, with no changes from the season entry list. It was the last race before the legal reintroduction of electronic driver aids at the following Spanish Grand Prix in late April.

Ferrari driver Michael Schumacher led the World Drivers' Championship with 26 championship points heading into the race, with McLaren driver David Coulthard second on 20 championship points. Rubens Barrichello, Schumacher's Ferrari teammate, was third with 10 championship points, ahead of Sauber's Nick Heidfeld in fourth with seven championship points and Jordan's Heinz-Harald Frentzen in fifth with six championship points. Ferrari led the World Constructors' Championship with 36 championship points, 15 ahead of second-placed McLaren. Sauber was third with eight championship points, followed by Jordan with seven championship points and British American Racing (BAR) on three championship points.

Following the Brazilian Grand Prix on 1 April, almost every team tested their cars, setups, tyres and car components on European racing tracks with their racing driver and test drivers in preparation for the San Marino Grand Prix. BAR, Jordan and McLaren tested for three days in inclement weather at Northamptonshire's Silverstone Circuit. Jordan's test driver Ricardo Zonta led the first day, while BAR's Jacques Villeneuve and McLaren's test driver Alexander Wurz were fastest on the second and third days. Arrows, Prost, Sauber and Williams tested for three days in variable weather at France's Circuit de Nevers Magny-Cours. Williams test driver Marc Gené was fastest on the first day, followed by Prost's Jean Alesi on the second day and Heidfeld on the third. Benetton tested for three days at Spain's Circuito de Jerez, with Jaguar joining on the second and third days. Ferrari tested for five days at its private Fiorano Circuit in Italy, with test driver Luca Badoer developing traction control systems in an F1-2000 car for the Spanish Grand Prix. Michael Schumacher tested tyre and aerodynamic developments in an F2001 car for three days for the race in Imola. Arrows collected aerodynamic data from driver Jonny Kane during straight line speed testing at France's Lurcy-Lévis track. Minardi did not test since it was awaiting the arrival of equipment from Brazil.

After Michael Schumacher won the first two races in Australia and Malaysia, Coulthard won in Brazil by passing Schumacher in the race, trailing the latter by six championship points and ending his six-race win streak. Coulthard stated he was satisfied with how the first three races went and spoke about his prospects of victory at Imola, "I have won here before and there is no reason why I cannot do so again." Michael Schumacher, the pre-race bookmakers' favourite, acknowledged that it was normal to not win every race in a season and said his team could return to form at Imola. Williams won six races at Imola in the 1990s. Driver Juan Pablo Montoya was acquainted with Imola from International Formula 3000 in 1998 and felt his car would be suited to the circuit but not performing as well as in Brazil, adding, "I have only been here once before in my life. It doesn't make a great difference, but it does help a little bit."

Multiple teams updated their cars for the race, while several squads experimented with different brake ducts for improved cooling and installed downforce-reliant aerodynamic packages. After being outpowered by the BMW engine, Ferrari created a more powerful Type 050 V10 engine by increasing its revolutions per minute limit. McLaren made various changes to the MP4-16 to improve its handling when mounting kerbs. It also debuted a redesigned rear wing and a stronger Mercedes V10 engine. BAR modified the 003's bodywork to incorporate new wings and narrower side flip-ups in the rear wheel. Arrows fitted a front wing with a wider flap to increase downforce while Jos Verstappen's car had a minor suspension modification made of steel rather than carbon fibre due to a lack of time. Sauber did not modify their car nor use Brembo calipers or power steering because they had not been thoroughly tested. Prost modified the front wing's endplate flip-ups since they damaged the front tyres when the cars were carried into the garage on full-lock. Minardi lacked a revised aerodynamic package as their cars arrived late from Brazil.

== Practice ==
The race was preceded by four practice sessions, two one-hour sessions on Friday and two 45-minute sessions on Saturday. The first practice session began on a damp, wet track after overnight rain had left parts of the circuit wet, causing spray to be raised off the ground due to the inclement weather. Drivers used wet-weather tyres at first, but lap times improved as the circuit dried swiftly, and they switched to slicks late in practice.

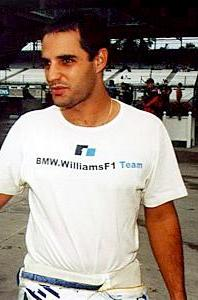
Juan Pablo Montoya (pictured in 2002) had his running restricted in Friday practice due to an engine problem.

Barrichello recorded the fastest time of 1:31.998, ahead of teammate Michael Schumacher. McLaren's Mika Häkkinen and Coulthard were third and fourth, followed by the Jordan pairing of Jarno Trulli and Frentzen, Sauber's Kimi Räikkönen, BAR's Olivier Panis, Jaguar's Eddie Irvine and Panis's teammate Villeneuve in fifth to tenth. Three drivers lost control of their cars at the wet turn 17 during the session. Verstappen was unable to set a lap time when his car stopped, owing to a drop in fuel pressure on his first lap after leaving the pit lane. Minardi's Fernando Alonso stopped his car on track with a hydraulic issue that resulted in a gearbox malfunction.

The track had dried sufficiently after the first session, allowing teams to mount slick tyres on their cars for the second session, which provided a more accurate indicator of the pace of drivers. With around 15 minutes to go, Michael Schumacher set the day's quickest time of 1:25.095, with his teammate Barrichello second. Williams's Ralf Schumacher, Häkkinen, Panis, Räikkönen, Irvine, Villeneuve, Trulli and Jaguar's Luciano Burti were in the next eight placings. Coulthard went off the circuit after losing control of his car and becoming stuck in the Acque Minerali corner's gravel trap with 13 minutes left in the session due to a gear selection issue. This meant McLaren's engineers worked overnight to repair Coulthard's car. Montoya suffered an engine problem caused by a piece of gauze dropping into the engine early in the session. He was unable to continue driving as the Williams engineers replaced the engine in his car.

The third practice session on Saturday morning was cold and wet due to overnight rain, resulting in lap times that were around 11 seconds slower than the 2000 pole position lap time. The cooler air caused the track to dry slowly. Michael Schumacher lapped fastest at 1:35.633, followed by his teammate Barrichello. Häkkinen, Coulthard, Trulli, Frentzen, Räikkönen, Heidfeld, Villeneuve, and Montoya rounded out the top ten. Several drivers were taken off guard on the wet track as their cars lost traction. On his second lap of the session, Burti lost control of his car's rear entering Tosa corner, severely damaging the front suspension hitting the tyre barrier. Burti exited the car unhurt, although he did not compete in the final session because his mechanics repaired the vehicle before qualifying.

It became sunny for the final session as the circuit gradually dried, and nearly every driver lapped faster than the previous session. Most drivers used wet-weather tyres, and some lost control of their car on the wet circuit. Michael Schumacher set the fastest lap of 1:30.737, followed by teammate Barrichello in second. Coulthard, Räikkönen, Frentzen, Heidfeld, Ralf Schumacher, Panis, Arrows's Enrique Bernoldi and Häkkinen occupied positions three to ten.

== Qualifying ==
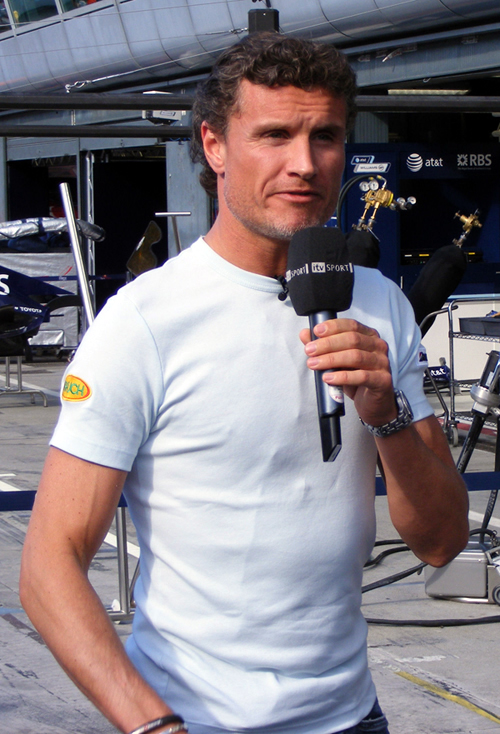
David Coulthard (pictured in 2007) took the eleventh pole position of his career in qualifying.

Each driver was limited to twelve laps during Saturday's one-hour qualifying session, with the starting order determined by their fastest laps. The 107% rule was in force during this session, which required each driver to set a time within 107% of the fastest lap to qualify for the race. The track had dried sufficiently after practice ended but was still damp in some places. There were dark clouds over Imola just before qualifying began, so most drivers, except Coulthard, set lap times early in case it rained. As the course dried, lap times improved as the surface provided more grip to cars. Coulthard adjusted his car's setup for his final run after rear-end stability issues and took the 11th pole position of his career with a time of 1:23.054 on his final qualifying lap late on. He broke Villeneuve's outright track lap record from 1997 and prevented Michael Schumacher from equalling Ayrton Senna's record of eight consecutive poles set between the 1988 and 1989 seasons. Coulthard was 0.228 seconds faster than teammate Häkkinen in the final runs, setting his time late in qualifying's final runs. Ralf Schumacher qualified third, feeling his Michelin tyres were quite competitive. The Ferraris of Michael Schumacher and Rubens Barrichello took fourth and sixth, respectively, after choosing the slower, more durable harder Bridgestone tyre compound over the better-performing softer option because they believed the softer tyres to wear too quickly and expected inclement weather for the race. Michael Schumacher, who adjusted the rear wing settings to increase downforce, lost time through two driver errors, while Barrichello was delayed by slower cars. Trulli took his time and separated the Ferraris, qualifying fifth with a late lap. Montoya, seventh, lost seven-tenths of a second by going wide onto the grass at the Variante Alta chicane on his final run.

Panis was pleased with the improvements to his car and took eighth. Frentzen was hampered on his second run by Tarso Marques's Minardi car, and on his third run, his car developed understeer, leaving him ninth. Räikkönen qualified ahead of teammate Heidfeld for the first time in 2001, securing tenth after running across the grass after braking too early for the final turn. Villeneuve in 11th was the fastest driver to not qualify in the top ten due to slower cars on his final run. Heidfeld took 12th after encountering slower vehicles on his penultimate run and losing time on his final run due to understeer and car balance issues. Irvine took 13th since his Jaguar could not adequately load the tyres. Alesi, 14th, drove a car that was sensitive to setup changes and changing track conditions. Burti was the slower Jaguar driver in 15th due to a slow gearbox downshift and a misfiring engine, causing him to go onto the grass at turn three during his final run. Bernoldi and Verstappen qualified 16th and 17th for Arrows, respectively. A technical issue affected Bernoldi's third run, and Verstappen's last run was in the spare Arrows car due to an engine-related electrical fault. Alonso took 18th after his team switched car settings. Benetton's Giancarlo Fisichella qualified 19th, and his teammate Jenson Button took 21st. On their last runs, both drivers were plagued by errors, a lack of grip, and slower cars, preventing them from lapping faster. Gastón Mazzacane was 20th for Prost after losing speed in the slower corners and his car's performance deteriorated. Marques completed the starting order in 22nd; he failed to find a suitable car setup, and on his final run, a slow front-left puncture developed.

=== Qualifying classification ===
Pos	No	Driver	Constructor	Lap	Gap	Grid
1	4	(United Kingdom) David Coulthard	McLaren-Mercedes	1:23.054	—	1
2	3	(Finland) Mika Häkkinen	McLaren-Mercedes	1:23.282	+0.228	2
3	5	(Germany) Ralf Schumacher	Williams-BMW	1:23.357	+0.303	3
4	1	(Germany) Michael Schumacher	Ferrari	1:23.593	+0.539	4
5	12	(Italy) Jarno Trulli	Jordan-Honda	1:23.658	+0.604	5
6	2	(Brazil) Rubens Barrichello	Ferrari	1:23.786	+0.732	6
7	6	(Colombia) Juan Pablo Montoya	Williams-BMW	1:24.141	+1.087	7
8	9	(France) Olivier Panis	BAR-Honda	1:24.213	+1.159	8
9	11	(Germany) Heinz-Harald Frentzen	Jordan-Honda	1:24.436	+1.382	9
10	17	(Finland) Kimi Räikkönen	Sauber-Petronas	1:24.671	+1.617	10
11	10	(Canada) Jacques Villeneuve	BAR-Honda	1:24.769	+1.715	11
12	16	(Germany) Nick Heidfeld	Sauber-Petronas	1:25.007	+1.953	12
13	18	(United Kingdom) Eddie Irvine	Jaguar-Cosworth	1:25.392	+2.338	13
14	22	(France) Jean Alesi	Prost-Acer	1:25.411	+2.357	14
15	19	(Brazil) Luciano Burti	Jaguar-Cosworth	1:25.572	+2.518	15
16	15	(Brazil) Enrique Bernoldi	Arrows-Asiatech	1:25.872	+2.818	16
17	14	(Netherlands) Jos Verstappen	Arrows-Asiatech	1:26.062	+3.008	17
18	21	(Spain) Fernando Alonso	Minardi-European	1:26.855	+3.801	18
19	7	(Italy) Giancarlo Fisichella	Benetton-Renault	1:26.902	+3.848	19
20	23	(Argentina) Gastón Mazzacane	Prost-Acer	1:27.750	+4.696	20
21	8	(United Kingdom) Jenson Button	Benetton-Renault	1:27.758	+4.704	21
22	20	(Brazil) Tarso Marques	Minardi-European	1:28.281	+5.227	22
107% time: 1:28.868

== Warm-up ==
On the morning of the race, there was a 30-minute warm-up session to finalise car setups and test the teams' racing strategy. The weather was dry and sunny as teams tested their race and spare cars. Coulthard had surgery to remove an abscess from the left rear that was causing vibrations in his ear the evening before the race. He lapped fastest at 1:26.440, ahead of Ralf Schumacher and Häkkinen, who both understeered into the gravel. Heidfeld and Barrichello were fourth and fifth. Alesi and Mazzacane went off the circuit, while Alonso's run was disrupted by mechanical troubles that saw him stop on the side of the track, although he was able to continue driving after returning to the pit lane and switching to the spare car. Räikkönen's running was restricted by a broken starting shaft in the backup Sauber car, and his race vehicle had an electrical failure.

== Race ==
The 62-lap race began at 14:00 local time in sunny weather, on a dry circuit, in front of between 80,000 and 100,000 spectators. (Note: Sources vary on the attendance, including 80,000, and 100,000.) The air temperature was between 14 and 16 °C (57 and 61 °F), and the track temperature ranged from 25 to 26 °C (77 to 79 °F); conditions were expected to remain dry for the event. During the start sequence, Coulthard moved slightly before applying the brakes to stop and stabilise his car. Coulthard experienced excess wheelspin in his rear tyres when the race began, as did his teammate Häkkinen on the track's dirty side. This allowed Ralf Schumacher to go to the inside after Coulthard gave him space; he avoided contact with Coulthard and passed both McLarens for the lead at the fast left-hand turn on the drive to the Tamburello chicane. Trulli passed the slow-starting Michael Schumacher and then braked later than Häkkinen into the Tamburello chicane to move into third. Panis moved from eighth to fifth, going to the outside on the straight, but Montoya overtook him on the outside at the final Variante Bassa chicane later in the first lap.

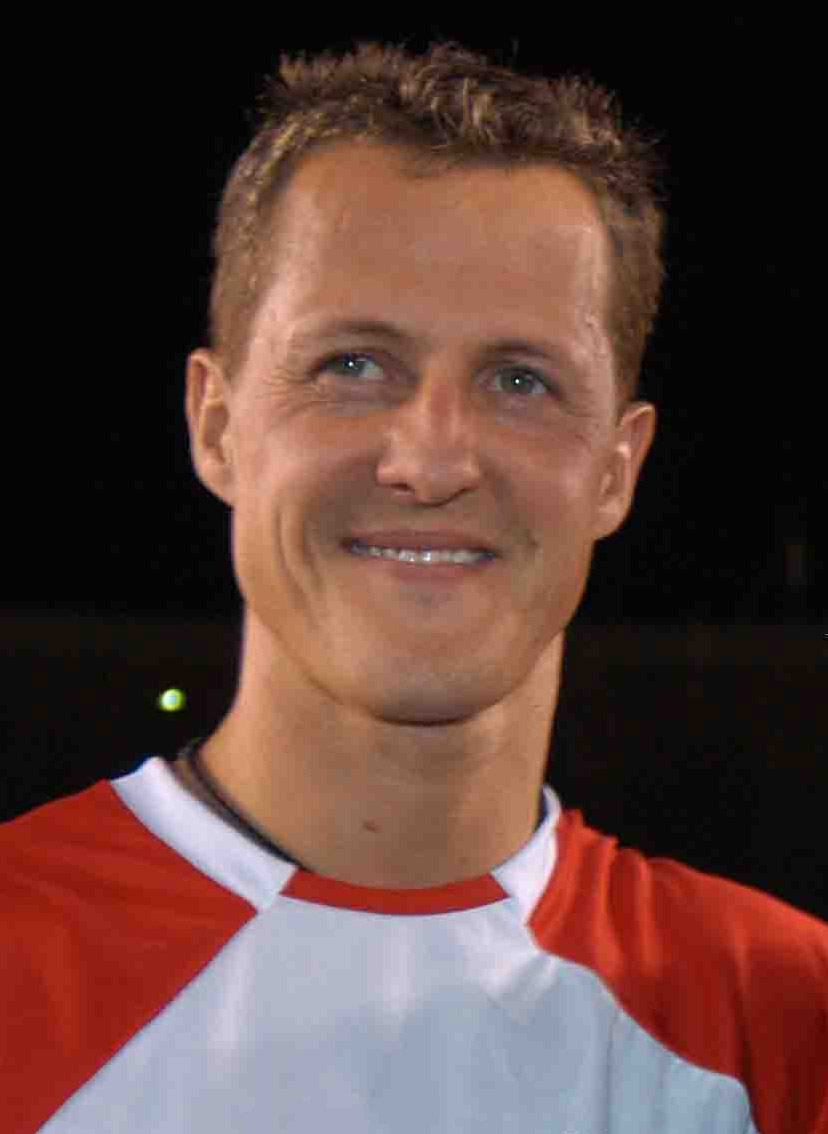
Michael Schumacher (pictured in 2005) retired from the race after completing 24 laps due to a brake caliper fault that caused a punctured tyre.

When lap one ended, Ralf Schumacher led Coulthard, Trulli, Häkkinen, Michael Schumacher and Montoya. Ralf Schumacher and Coulthard began pulling away from Trulli, who was battling Häkkinen for third, and a pack of cars formed behind them. Heidfeld passed Irvine for 12th, and Verstappen overtook Burti for 16th on lap two. Panis was investigated for a possible jump start but was not penalised. Michael Schumacher appeared to slow exiting the final curve ending lap three after reportedly selecting third gear when mounting the kerbs and his right rear wheel was off the track surface. This confounded the electronic gearbox system, preventing the upshift and keeping him in second gear after leaving the corner. He fell to seventh on the start/finish straight, behind Montoya and Panis, and ran wide at Tosa corner, being passed by teammate Barrichello on the inside. Barrichello went wide on lap five, but Michael Schumacher could not pass him. Verstappen passed Fisichella for 15th on that lap while Marques overtook Mazzacane.

On lap six, while closing on Button, Alonso's brakes failed due to a leaking brake caliper. This launched him over the high kerb at the Variante Alta chicane, onto the grass, and damaged his car's front-right suspension against the tyre wall at the turn's exit. Alonso was unhurt but became the race's first retirement. Two laps later, Verstappen stopped at the side of the Rivazza turn with a broken exhaust pipe that caused a series of overheating issues in his car. Panis was slowing Barrichello due to understeer and electronic gear selection issues until the latter passed him on the inside at the Rivazza turn for sixth on the same lap. Michael Schumacher was challenged by Räikkönen on lap nine, but he passed Panis for seventh at the Rivazza turn. Ralf Schumacher extended his lead over Coulthard to four seconds after both drivers traded fastest laps because Michelin's tyres generated temperature on the warm circuit faster than Bridgestone's tyres. Trulli, who was battling Häkkinen for third, was 20 seconds behind by lap 16.

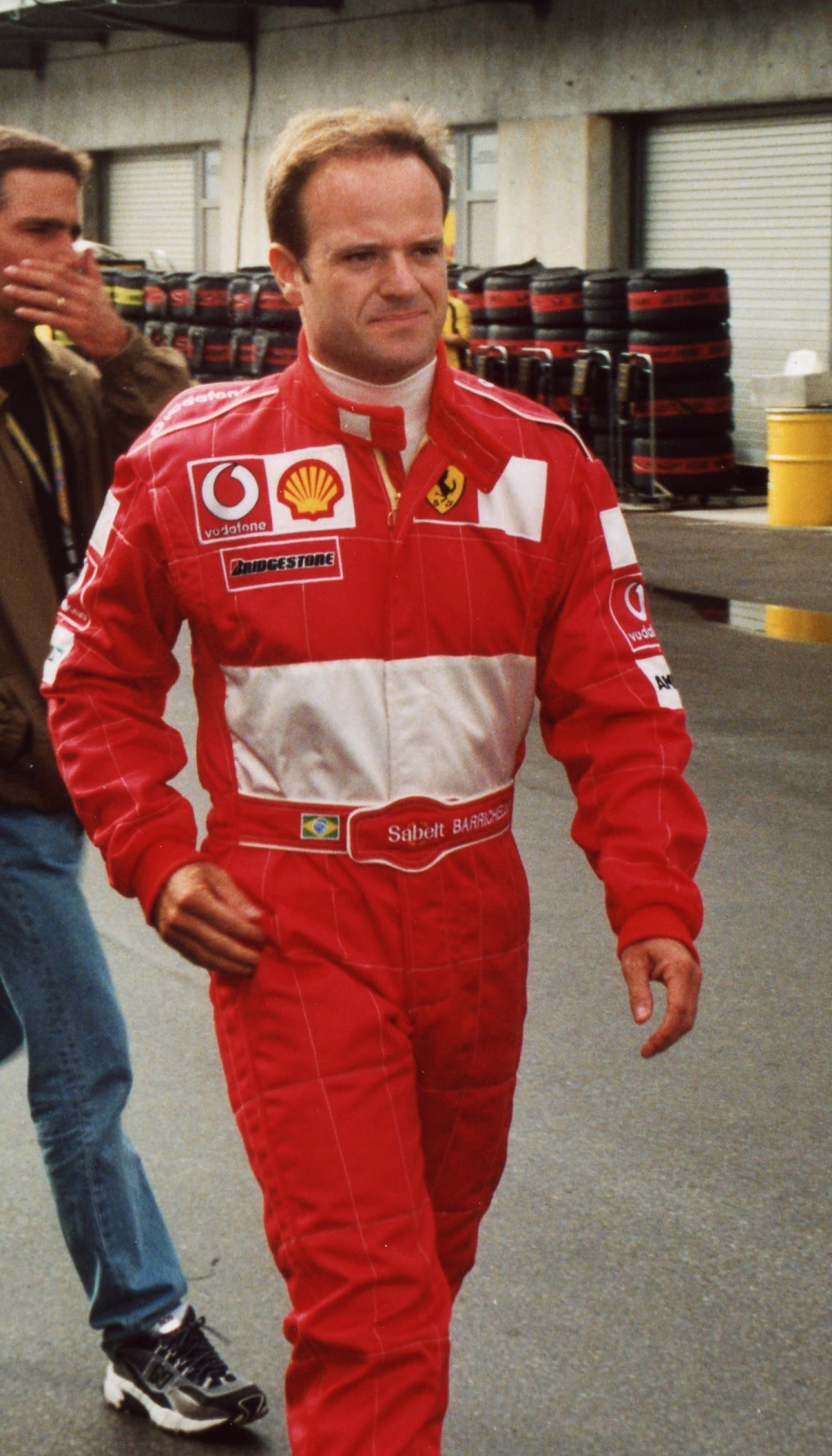
Rubens Barrichello (pictured in 2002) took third place when Ferrari switched from a two stop to a one-stop strategy so that he could pass Mika Häkkinen.

Räikkönen in ninth was racing Panis when the steering wheel disconnected from the spline cresting the hill on the straight connecting the Tosa hairpin and Piratella turn. On lap 18, his car veered sharply to the left and crashed into the retaining barrier at low speed. Although Räikkönen was unhurt, he was forced to retire. Button made the race's first scheduled fuel and tyre pit stop on lap 20. He had to make another pit stop on the following lap when his car received no fuel due to a refuelling rig malfunction. Panis dropped from eighth to 12th on lap 22 after selecting the wrong gear. Michael Schumacher got a puncture on his left front wheel rim due to the brake caliper becoming too hot, resulting in its failure on the following lap. He drove cautiously to the pit lane to ensure that the puncture did not cause any further damage. Schumacher rejoined the track one lap down in 19th and last place. Trulli was the first of the leading drivers to make a pit stop on lap 24. Häkkinen was promoted to third, giving him the opportunity to drive without aerodynamic turbulence affecting his McLaren, while Trulli rejoined in eighth. Michael Schumacher completed one exploratory lap before Ferrari summoned him into the pit lane to retire for safety reasons after discovering more problems with his car.

Montoya made his pit stop from fourth on lap 28 and rejoined in seventh, behind Trulli. Coulthard entered the pit lane for the first of two pit stops on the next lap and remained second after establishing a sufficient lead over teammate Häkkinen. Montoya closed up to Trulli on that lap, passing him on the outside at the Tamburello chicane for sixth. Ralf Schumacher made his pit stop from the lead on lap 29 and retained an eight-second lead over Coulthard. Häkkinen made his first pit stop soon after, rejoining ahead of Montoya and Trulli but behind Barrichello. An oil leak caused Mazzacane's engine to fail and emit flames from the car's rear, and he retired on lap 31. Villeneuve was set to score points until he pulled over to the side of the track when oil smoke emitted from his car's rear exhaust system on the following lap.

Ferrari moved Barrichello from a two-stop to a one-stop strategy in order to put less fuel in his car and allow him to pass Häkkinen. He made his pit stop on lap 33 and rejoined the track in third, having pulled ahead of Häkkinen. Benetton brought Fisichella into the pit lane to retire with a misfiring engine on the same lap because the team did not want to risk an engine failure. The following fifteen laps saw little action as Ralf Schumacher maintained his lead over Coulthard, but the margin fluctuated due to slower cars, while Coulthard was aware that passing Schumacher would necessitate a better strategy. Barrichello pulled away from the slower Häkkinen but was 26 seconds behind Coulthard by lap 42. Trulli, in sixth, began the second round of pit stops on lap 44, falling behind teammate Frentzen.

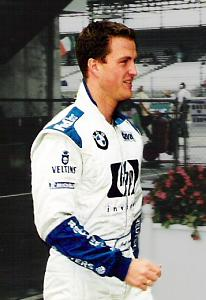
Ralf Schumacher (pictured in 2002), who won his maiden Grand Prix and became the first brother of a Grand Prix winner to claim victory for himself.

Irvine, in ninth, pulled over to the side of the track with smoke streaming from his car's air intake box when his engine failed on the same lap. Coulthard and Ralf Schumacher made their second pit stops between laps 45 and 46, remaining second and first, respectively. Häkkinen and Barrichello followed suit over the next two laps. Montoya's pit stop on lap 48 was troublesome. The mechanics were unable to remove the refuelling rig from the car's rear, and the engine stalled simultaneously. The engine was restarted on the jacks, losing Montoya over a minute on pit lane. He completed one slow lap as he was stuck in first gear after the clutch burned out and retired in the garage. On lap 54, Marques stopped alongside the pit lane barrier, with smoke billowng from his car's rear due to an airbox fire, presumably caused by a leaky fuel line. Marshals pushed Marques's car off the road and into a secure place, allowing him to depart.

With seven laps remaining, Ralf Schumacher's pitboard displayed "Oil Pump" as he slowed, and Coulthard gradually gained on him. Ralf Schumacher led the rest of the race, securing his first win and becoming the first Grand Prix winner's brother to win on his own. It was Williams's first win since the 1997 Luxembourg Grand Prix. Coulthard finished 4.3 seconds behind in second. Barrichello finished third on the podium, 30 seconds behind Coulthard. Häkkinen finished fourth despite nose cone damage from a minor first-lap collision with Trulli, which caused his McLaren's front end to loosen. Trulli finished fifth, the last driver on the lead lap, while teammate Frentzen had a quiet race to finish sixth and score the final championship point. Heidfeld finished seventh due to car balance issues and lacked the pace to compensate for a poor start. Panis finished eighth after his electrical problem was resolved with a replacement steering wheel during his first pit stop. Alesi on a two-stop strategy lost time following the one-stopping Irvine and was ninth. Bernoldi was tenth, registering his first Grand Prix finish. Burti finished eleventh despite losing the use of the first three gears and having to be circumspect. Button was the final classified finisher, two laps behind Ralf Schumacher. Just 12 of the 22 starters finished the race.

=== Post-race ===
The top three drivers appeared on the podium to collect their trophies and spoke to the media in the subsequent press conference. Ralf Schumacher lauded his car setup and the engine, believing his win might begin a three-way battle for the World Championship. He said of the victory, "It's a great experience, and I hope for it to be one of many. I've waited long enough for it, I guess. Since I joined Williams, we've had a lot of work to see that and it paid off today." Coulthard stated that he was pleased to come second in comparison to other races over the season, adding "it was definitely the most difficult to try to achieve a balance with respect to the tyres, there was quite a big variation" since there was a minor inconsistency with each set of tyres. Barrichello was pleased with his Ferrari's balance and admitted to slowing in the final laps because he was trailing Coulthard. Asked if Ferrari's tyre selection was the right one, he replied, "At the end of the day we had a good tire for the race, but we may have been slow a little bit in qualifying, and that was probably a mistake."

Williams's victory was popular amongst the paddock. Jaguar team principal and three-time world champion Niki Lauda heralded Ralf Schumacher's win as "the perfect race", adding, "The first Grand Prix win is always the most difficult. The next ones come easier. It will be a big boost for his confidence." Williams technical director Patrick Head characterised Schumacher's form at Imola as "perfect", stating, "Winning for the first time helps you a lot. What's happened will be very good for him." BMW Motorsport director Gerhard Berger said, "Ralf was strong wasn't he? It was a very good race, a really strong and convincing performance." Willi Weber, the manager of the Schumacher brothers, said Ralf Schumacher's victory would help him gain confidence as a driver and that it came at the ideal time given the increased attention his teammate Montoya was receiving.

Häkkinen said his opportunity to win the race ended at the start but was happy to finish fourth: "It is very pleasant to get some points, although unfortunately the overall position was not very good for me. It would have been nice to win, but I am happy." Trulli called his fifth-place finish "a good result" and that he "was able to show once more that when I have a good car and everything is working well, I can be right there." Frentzen blamed a slow start for his inability to compete for a better finishing position but said, "Scoring a point for sixth place was some consolation but, to be honest, we need to step up our performance a bit more." Michael Schumacher stated that the event was disappointing because of his poor start and gear selection issue. Montoya claimed he might have finished on the podium and said that a cockpit warning light informed him of a clutch issue five laps before his second pit stop.

Coulthard's second-place finish and podium finishes in the first four races put him in joint first place in the World Drivers' Championship with Michael Schumacher with 26 championship points each; Schumacher had won two races to Coulthard's one and so remained first overall. Barrichello retained third with 14 championship points as Ralf Schumacher's victory moved him from seventh to fourth. Heidfeld's failure to score dropped him from fourth to fifth. Ferrari maintained its lead in the World Constructors' Championship with 40 championship points, while McLaren reduced their advantage to ten. With 13 races remaining in the season, Williams moved from sixth to third, Jordan remained fourth, and Sauber dropped from third to fifth.

=== Race classification ===
Drivers who scored championship points are denoted in bold.

Pos	No	Driver	Constructor	Tyre	Laps	Time/Retired	Grid	Points
1	5	(Germany) **Ralf Schumacher**	**Williams-BMW**	M	62	1:30:44.817	3	10
2	4	(United Kingdom) **David Coulthard**	**McLaren-Mercedes**	B	62	+4.352	1	6
3	2	(Brazil) **Rubens Barrichello**	**Ferrari**	B	62	+34.766	6	4
4	3	(Finland) **Mika Häkkinen**	**McLaren-Mercedes**	B	62	+36.315	2	3
5	12	(Italy) **Jarno Trulli**	**Jordan-Honda**	B	62	+1:25.558	5	2
6	11	(Germany) **Heinz-Harald Frentzen**	**Jordan-Honda**	B	61	+1 Lap	9	1
7	16	(Germany) Nick Heidfeld	Sauber-Petronas	B	61	+1 Lap	12	
8	9	(France) Olivier Panis	BAR-Honda	B	61	+1 Lap	8	
9	22	(France) Jean Alesi	Prost-Acer	M	61	+1 Lap	14	
10	15	(Brazil) Enrique Bernoldi	Arrows-Asiatech	B	60	+2 Laps	16	
11	19	(Brazil) Luciano Burti	Jaguar-Cosworth	M	60	+2 Laps	15	
12	8	(United Kingdom) Jenson Button	Benetton-Renault	M	60	+2 Laps	21	
Ret	20	(Brazil) Tarso Marques	Minardi-European	M	50	Engine	22	
Ret	6	(Colombia) Juan Pablo Montoya	Williams-BMW	M	48	Clutch	7	
Ret	18	(United Kingdom) Eddie Irvine	Jaguar-Cosworth	M	42	Engine	13	
Ret	7	(Italy) Giancarlo Fisichella	Benetton-Renault	M	31	Engine	19	
Ret	10	(Canada) Jacques Villeneuve	BAR-Honda	B	30	Engine	11	
Ret	23	(Argentina) Gastón Mazzacane	Prost-Acer	M	28	Engine	20	
Ret	1	(Germany) Michael Schumacher	Ferrari	B	24	Suspension	4	
Ret	17	(Finland) Kimi Räikkönen	Sauber-Petronas	B	17	Steering/Accident	10	
Ret	14	(Netherlands) Jos Verstappen	Arrows-Asiatech	B	6	Exhaust	17	
Ret	21	(Spain) Fernando Alonso	Minardi-European	M	5	Brakes/Accident	18	

== Championship standings after the race ==
Drivers' Championship standings

+/–	Pos	Driver	Points
	1	(Germany) Michael Schumacher	26
	2	(United Kingdom) David Coulthard	26
	3	(Brazil) Rubens Barrichello	14
3	4	(Germany) Ralf Schumacher	12
1	5	(Germany) Nick Heidfeld	7

Constructors' Championship standings

+/–	Pos	Constructor	Points
	1	(Italy) Ferrari	40
	2	(United Kingdom) McLaren-Mercedes	30
3	3	(United Kingdom) Williams-BMW	12
	4	(Republic of Ireland) Jordan-Honda	10
2	5	(Switzerland) Sauber-Petronas	8
Sources:

- Note: Only the top five positions are included for both sets of standings.

== Notes ==
Previous race: 2001 Brazilian Grand Prix	FIA Formula One World Championship; 2001 season	Next race: 2001 Spanish Grand Prix
Previous race: 2000 San Marino Grand Prix	San Marino Grand Prix	Next race: 2002 San Marino Grand Prix
