= Benetton B200 =

Formula One racing car

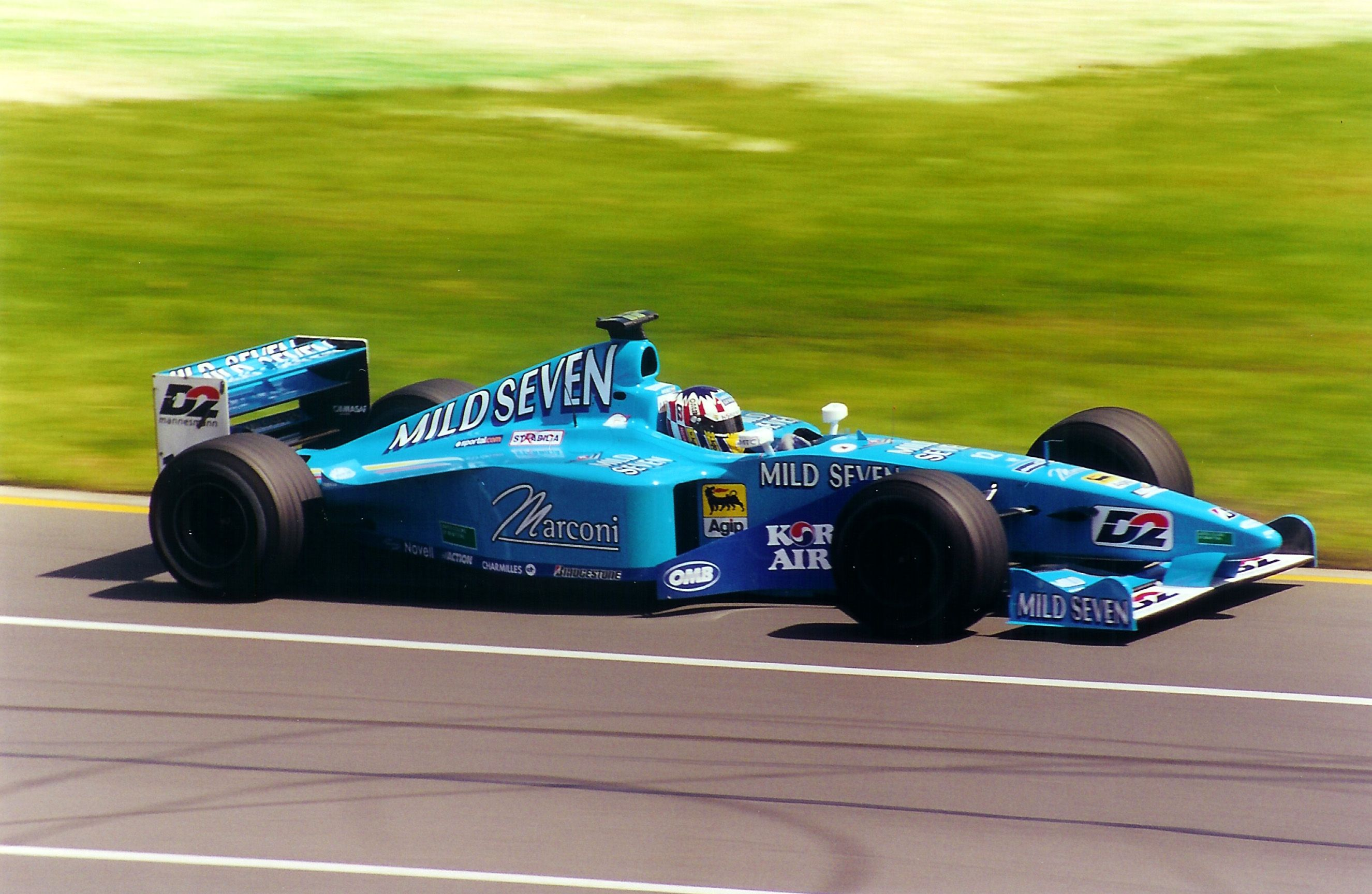
- Alexander Wurz driving the B200 at the 2000 Australian Grand Prix
- Category: Formula One
- Constructor: Benetton
- Designers: Pat Symonds (Technical Director); Tim Densham (Chief Designer); Ben Agathangelou (Head of Aerodynamics)
- Predecessor: B199
- Successor: B201

Technical specifications
- Chassis: Moulded carbon-fibre monocoque
- Suspension (front): Double wishbones, pushrod/torsion bar
- Suspension (rear): Double wishbones, pushrod/coil spring
- Axle track: Front: 1,450 mm (57 in); Rear: 1,425 mm (56.1 in)
- Engine: Playlife-badged Renault-derived Supertec FB02 2,998 cc (183 cu in) V10 Naturally-aspirated mid-mounted
- Transmission: Benetton 6-speed sequential semi-automatic Longitudinally mounted
- Power: 775-780 hp @ 17,500 rpm
- Weight: 600 kg (1,300 lb) (including driver)
- Fuel: Agip
- Tyres: Bridgestone

Competition history
- Notable entrants: Mild Seven Benetton Playlife
- Notable drivers: 11. (Italy) Giancarlo Fisichella; 12. (Austria) Alexander Wurz
- Debut: 2000 Australian Grand Prix
- Last event: 2000 Malaysian Grand Prix
Races	Wins	Podiums	Poles	F/Laps
17	0	3	0	0
- Constructors' Championships: 0 (4th: 2000)
- Drivers' Championships: 0

The Benetton B200 was the car with which the Benetton team competed in the 2000 Formula One World Championship. It was driven by Italian Giancarlo Fisichella and Austrian Alexander Wurz, both in their third season with the team. Japanese Hidetoshi Mitsusada was appointed the team's test driver, before being dropped in May.

== Design and development ==
The B200 was launched in January 2000 in the Museu Nacional d'Art de Catalunya alongside being broadcast on their new website that launched in the same month. Tim Densham was appointed Chief Designer for the B200, replacing the outgoing Nick Wirth. Densham had previously worked on the aborted Honda RA099 project. The B200 sought to return to basics, after the complex B199 from the season before often suffered poor reliability. The B200 featured an upgraded engine, the Playlife FB02 manufactured by Supertec, which was tailor made for the B200, though this engine was still based on the Renault RS9 engine.

Prior to the season, the team took part in both the January testing at Barcelona and February testing at Jerez and Barcelona. In February, the team unveiled their new Human Performance Centre linked with driver development for the 2000 season.

The B200 was primarily sponsored by the Mild Seven tobacco brand, and continued to be painted in a sky blue colour. Alongside this, the team retained sponsorship from the likes of D2, whilst adding new partners Marconi and MTCI.

=== Renault ===
Following the first Grand Prix of the season, it was announced Renault would purchase the Benetton team from the Benetton Family. The $120million deal, saw Renault join as a key sponsor for the B200, and successor B201 before Renault took full ownership of the team in 2002.

== Racing performance ==
The B200 got off to a successful start, scoring two points with Fisichella in the first race of the season. Ahead of the Brazilian Grand Prix, Rocco Benetton's successor Flavio Briatore returned to the team having been appointed by Renault at Team Principal. He oversaw the team secure a podium finish, again with Fisichella, as he finished in third place at Interlagos. Days later he would be promoted to second place after David Coulthard was disqualified.

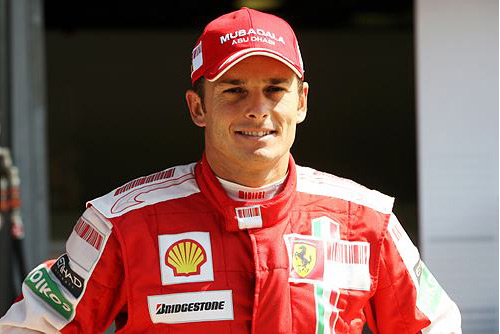
Fisichella scored three podium finishes in the B200.

After the initial success, the following three Grand Prix were barren for the team with no points scored. Prior to the European Grand Prix, the team dropped test driver Mitsusada following underperformance in F3000. They quickly recruited Antonio Pizzonia who began testing and development duties in the B200. For their backroom team, it was also announced Mike Gascoyne would join from Jordan Grand Prix for 2001.

At the European Grand Prix, Fisichella finished 5th adding two more points to the B200's total. He would go on to secure back to back podiums in Monaco and later Canada, thanks to a one stop pit strategy. However, the good fortune was short lived as he retired from four of the next five Grand Prix.

In comparison to Fisichella, Wurz had a poor season. It took until the Italian Grand Prix to score his first points of the season, finishing 5th. During the season it was speculated that Pizzonia would replace him, and by August Jenson Button was signed for the team ahead of 2001.

Wurz's efforts at Monza would be the final points scored for the B200 in the 2000 season. The team finished fourth in the Constructors' Championship, tied with British American Racing on 20 points, but placed ahead due to Fisichella's three podium finishes.

Following the conclusion of the season, future double Formula One World Champion Fernando Alonso tested the Benetton B200. Future race winner Mark Webber was appointed 2001 test driver and also completed laps in the B200, at Estoril Circuit.

== Livery ==
Benetton used the 'Mild Seven' logos, except at the French and British Grands Prix.

== Complete Formula One results ==
(key) (results in bold indicate pole position)

Year	Entrant	Engine	Tyres	Drivers	1	2	3	4	5	6	7	8	9	10	11	12	13	14	15	16	17	Points	WCC
2000	Mild Seven Benetton Playlife*	Playlife V10	**B**		AUS	BRA	SMR	GBR	ESP	EUR	MON	CAN	FRA	AUT	GER	HUN	BEL	ITA	USA	JPN	MAL	**20**	**4th**
2000	Mild Seven Benetton Playlife*	Playlife V10	**B**	(Italy) Giancarlo Fisichella	5	2	11	7	9	5	3	3	9	Ret	Ret	Ret	Ret	11	Ret	14	9	**20**	**4th**
2000	Mild Seven Benetton Playlife*	Playlife V10	**B**	(Austria) Alexander Wurz	7	Ret	9	9	10	12	Ret	9	Ret	10	Ret	11	13	5	10	Ret	7	**20**	**4th**

* Denotes Supertec-built engines, badged as Playlife
