= Tim Newton (motorsport) =

British mechanic

- Born: 22 June 1962 (age 63)
- Citizenship: (United Kingdom) British
- Occupation: Team manager
- Years active: 1983 - 2017
- Employer: Williams Racing

Tim Newton is a retired British Formula One and motorsport motorsports executive and mechanic. He is best known for his twenty-two years at Williams Racing, where he managed both the team's race and test operations.

== Career ==
Newton began his career in motorsport in the early 1980s, working as a technician and mechanic across motorcycle racing and junior single-seater teams, including roles with Hesketh Motorcycles, Gerry Marshall Racing, and Roger Dowson Engineering. He later worked as a race team mechanic at Arrows International between 1989 and 1994.

In 1994, Newton joined Williams Touring Car Engineering as chief mechanic before progressing through operational roles within the Williams organisation, including team co-ordinator and technical operations manager. In 1999, he moved into Formula One as test team manager for Williams Racing, overseeing test operations through the early 2000s.

He was appointed team manager at Williams taking over from Dickie Stanford before the start of the 2006 season, a role in which he was responsible for trackside operations, logistics and coordination of the race team. When Stanford returned to the race team in July 2010, Newton took a senior job at the Williams factory as production general manager. He later became the support team manager, continuing to oversee operational aspects of the Formula One programme through to 2017.

Alongside his Formula One responsibilities, Newton also served as team manager for Panasonic Jaguar Racing during the team's early participation in the Formula E Championship.
