= 2001 British Grand Prix =

Race 11 of 17 in the 2001 Formula One World Championship
← Previous race	Next race →
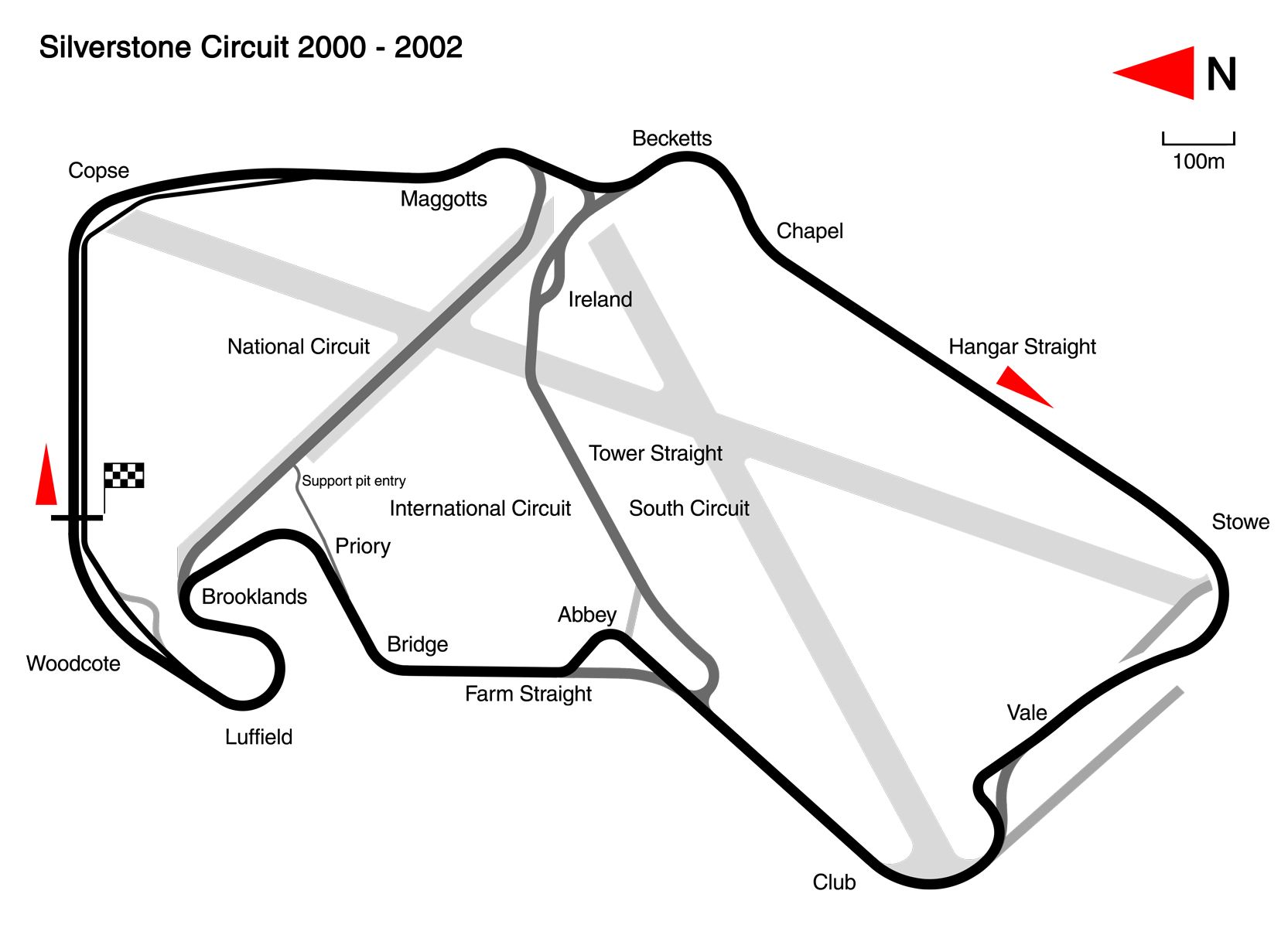
- Silverstone Circuit

Race details
- Date: 15 July 2001
- Official name: 2001 Foster's British Grand Prix
- Location: Silverstone, Northamptonshire and Buckinghamshire, England
- Course: Permanent racing facility
- Course length: 5.140 km (3.194 miles)
- Distance: 60 laps, 308.400 km (191.640 miles)
- Weather: Partially cloudy, mild, dry, Air Temp: 16 °C (61 °F), Track 27 °C (81 °F)
- Attendance: 267,000 (Three day)

Pole position
Driver	(Germany) Michael Schumacher	Ferrari
- Time: 1:20.447

Fastest lap
Driver	(Finland) Mika Häkkinen	McLaren-Mercedes
- Time: 1:23.405 on lap 34

Podium
First	(Finland) Mika Häkkinen	McLaren-Mercedes
Second	(Germany) Michael Schumacher	Ferrari
Third	(Brazil) Rubens Barrichello	Ferrari

The 2001 British Grand Prix (formally the 2001 Foster's British Grand Prix) was a Formula One motor race held on 15 July 2001 at the Silverstone Circuit, England, United Kingdom. It was the 11th of 17 rounds in the 2001 Formula One World Championship and was the 52nd time that the British Grand Prix had been included in the championship since 1950. McLaren driver Mika Häkkinen won the 60-lap race after starting second. The Ferrari duo of Michael Schumacher and Rubens Barrichello finished in second and third, respectively.

Heading into the Grand Prix, Michael Schumacher led the World Drivers' Championship from McLaren's David Coulthard while Ferrari led McLaren in the World Constructors' Championship. Schumacher secured pole position after setting the fastest lap time in the one-hour qualifying session, with Häkkinen starting second. He led the first four laps before running wide at Copse corner, allowing Häkkinen to take the race lead. Häkkinen led throughout the majority of the race, except for the first round of pit stops, when he lost it to Williams driver Juan Pablo Montoya for three laps, and won his first race since the 2000 Belgian Grand Prix as well as his 19th overall. Schumacher finished 33.6 seconds behind in second.

The Grand Prix result increased Schumacher's World Drivers' Championship lead to 37 championship points over Coulthard, who retired on lap three due to a suspension failure caused by a first-lap collision with Jordan's Jarno Trulli. Ferrari maintained a 56-point lead over McLaren in the World Constructors' Championship, while Williams remained third with six races left in the season.

== Background ==
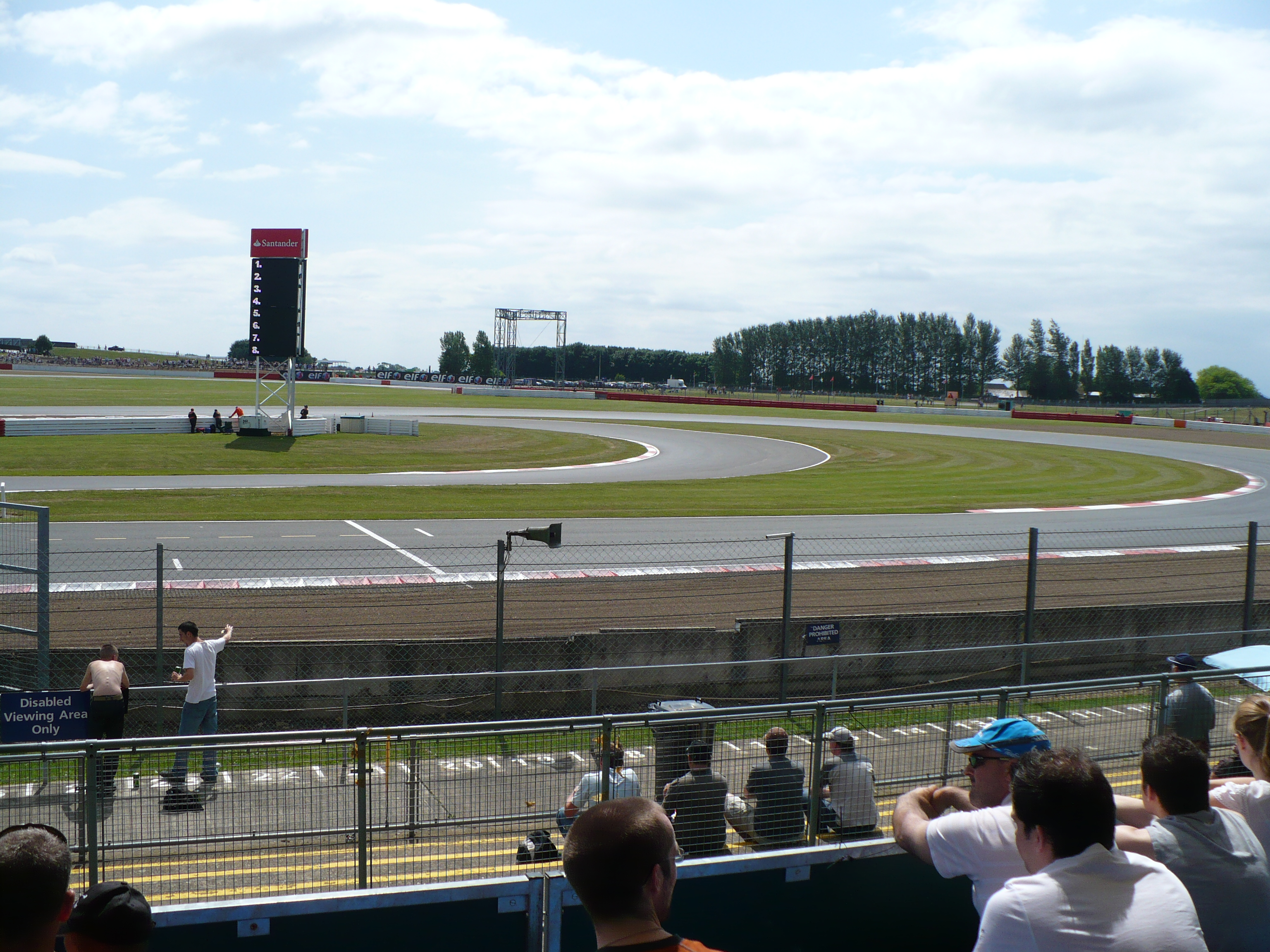
The Silverstone Circuit (pictured in 2009), where the British Grand Prix was held

The 2001 British Grand Prix was the 11th of 17 Formula One races in the 2001 Formula One World Championship, held on 15 July 2001, at the 5.140 km (3.194 mi) Silverstone Circuit in England, United Kingdom. It was the 52nd British Grand Prix in the Formula One World Championship, which began in 1950. Before the race, Ferrari's Michael Schumacher led the World Drivers' Championship with 78 championship points, ahead of McLaren's David Coulthard on 47 championship points in second and Williams's Ralf Schumacher (30). Ferrari's Rubens Barrichello was fourth with 30 championship points and Williams's Juan Pablo Montoya was fifth on 12 championship points. Ferrari led the World Constructors' Championship with 108 championship points, 52 ahead of the second-placed McLaren. Williams were third with 43 championship points. Sauber were fourth with 16 championship points, one championship point ahead of Jordan in fifth.

After heavy rain affected the previous year's British Grand Prix, necessitating the closure of Silverstone's car parks, forcing spectators to walk long distances to attend the event, the Fédération Internationale de l'Automobile (FIA; Formula One's regulatory body) awarded the Motor Sports Association, the Grand Prix organisers, a reprieve after pledging to remedy the flaws, and the next British Grand Prix was tentatively scheduled for 13 May 2001. Although FIA president Max Mosley threatened to cancel the race due to Silverstone's poor facilities, a meeting of the FIA World Motor Sport Council in Seville, Spain on 4 October 2000 saw it awarded a July date after the British Racing Drivers' Club, Silverstone's proprietors, were assessed to have improved the track; the Austrian Grand Prix organisers agreed to move the race from July to May to accommodate the British Grand Prix, following a request by Formula One boss Bernie Ecclestone.

After the French Grand Prix on 1 July, teams evaluated car components, settings, electronics and tyres at various European racing tracks from 3 to 6 July in preparation for the British Grand Prix. The Jordan, McLaren, Sauber, British American Racing (BAR) and Jaguar teams tested for four days at Italy's Monza Circuit. Jaguar's Eddie Irvine withdrew early from testing due to a reoccurring pain in the upper part of his cervical spine he had been suffering since June and was replaced by British Formula Three driver André Lotterer from the afternoon of the second day. The Benetton and Williams teams tested for four days at Spain's Circuit de Barcelona. Ferrari went to Italy's Mugello Circuit before heading to their private testing facility, the Fiorano Circuit, for three days, joined later on by BAR and Minardi. Luca Badoer spent two days at Fiorano testing the F2001's electronic launch control system and practice standing starts for the Silverstone race. Arrows held three days of straight-line aerodynamic car configuration tests with former Indy Lights driver Jonny Kane at Italy's Vairano circuit, while Williams did the same for three days at France's Lurcy-Lévis track.

Michael Schumacher, the bookmakers' pre-race favourite for the win, had the chance to tie Alain Prost's all-time record of 51 career victories at Silverstone. He stated that he was not prioritising statistics, but rather taking a race-by-race approach to achieving the "maximum possible" for both championships. Coulthard had won the British Grand Prix twice in succession in 1999 and 2000 and said he wanted to become the first driver to win the race three years running since Jim Clark in 1964. He added "I really need to win the British GP this year" because it would return him to championship contention and prevent Michael Schumacher from attaining an unassailable points advantage after securing one podium result in the previous four races.

Eleven two-driver teams competed, each representing a different constructor, with no changes to the entry list from the previous race. Lotterer was on standby to replace the injured Irvine for the Grand Prix, but the latter entered the event. Some teams modified their cars for the race. Ferrari reused a qualifying-spec engine and modified the F2001's lower front wing endplates slightly. McLaren driver Mika Häkkinen drove a qualifying-specification car for the race that had no end side chimneys to maximise the MP4-16 car's drag co-efficiency. Benetton had launch control for the first time. Jaguar added a revised floor and new bargeboards, while McLaren made minor aerodynamic changes, including new front brake ducts. Sauber had brought new brake ducts and revised their bargeboards. Williams also introduced redesigned bargeboards for the event and increased cooling by reducing the engine cover's rear edge above the rear suspension. Prost switched to an older undertray for Jean Alesi's car, which he preferred over the new version débuted for the race. BAR unveiled Honda-built rear suspensions with carbon fibre pushrods, while Jordan debuted a new rear wing. Arrows debuted new brake ducts with the middle part moved forwards to improve the A22 car's cooling. Minardi introduced no new components to their car because it was focused on building a new titanium gearbox.

== Practice ==
The race was preceded by four practice sessions, two one-hour sessions on Friday and two 45-minute sessions on Saturday. The first session, held on Friday morning, was dry and cloudy. Michael Schumacher lapped fastest at 1:23.619 after 46 minutes, 0.786 seconds faster than teammate Barrichello in second. Häkkinen, Coulthard. Jordan's Heinz-Harald Frentzen. Irvine, the BAR duo Olivier Panis and Jacques Villeneuve, Frentzen's teammate Jarno Trulli and Kimi Räikkönen (Sauber) were in positions three to ten. Räikkönen spun at Abbey corner but continued. Montoya spun into Vale corner after pushing hard with ten minutes left but continued. His Williams teammate Ralf Schumacher lost the rear of his car at the Bridge turn but was able to continue. Pedro de la Rosa stopped his Jaguar in the centre of the track with a fuel supply issue and set no lap times in the session.

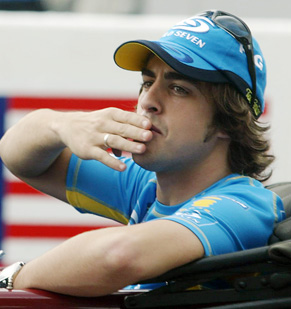
Fernando Alonso (pictured in 2006) twice spun his Minardi car during the second practice session.

The second session began sunny and windy, but heavy clouds formed low around Silverstone, and rain fell in the final ten minutes, creating a slippery track surface that slowed drivers. Häkkinen set the day's fastest lap of 1:22.827 with 14 minutes left, 0.067 seconds quicker than teammate Coulthard. The Ferrari pair of Barrichello and Michael Schumacher were third and fourth. Frentzen's car had an oil leak at the start of the session but duplicated his first-session result in fifth. Heidfeld, De la Rosa, Ralf Schumacher, Trulli and Räikkönen completed the top ten. Villeneuve lost control of his car's rear at Copse Corner, after the start/finish straight, owing to a front suspension failure, spun 360 degrees and damaged the front wing endplates. Fernando Alonso spun at Copse turn but returned to the pit lane with damage to the rear of his Minardi car. He spun again when he mounted the kerb driving onto the Hangar straight and spun into the grass. Alonso's undertray was damaged, and was unable to continue driving because the sodden grass prevented him from gaining traction.

It rained on the circuit during the third practice session before clearing up later, but it was cold. It took 15 minutes before cars circulated the track, and several drivers lost control of their cars on the sodden track surface; a large amount of spray was lifted from the circuit, reducing visibility. Michael Schumacher led with a lap of 1:31.430, followed by Frentzen, the McLarens of Häkkinen and Coulthard, Barrichello, Heidfeld, Trulli, Ralf Schumacher, Panis and Montoya. After 11 minutes, Villeneuve failed to set a lap owing to a gearbox issue, causing him to halt on the grass near the pit lane exit. Irvine had to drive slowly to the pit lane with a hydraulic throttle failure on his R2 car.

More rain fell between the third and fourth practice sessions, preventing most drivers from improving their lap times, which were more than four seconds slower than the previous session, and causing several to slide off the circuit. The rain later eased off slightly and the circuit dried slowly with standing water becoming less prevalent. Michael Schumacher remained fastest, ahead of Frentzen, Häkkinen, Coulthard, Barrichello, Heidfeld, Trulli, Räikkönen (who avoided hitting a hare that had breached circuit perimeters), Panis and Ralf Schumacher in positions two to ten. Tarso Marques was the only driver who did not set a lap time in the session when he lost control of his Minardi car while scrubbing his tyres and spun backwards into the gravel trap at Abbey chicane.

== Qualifying ==
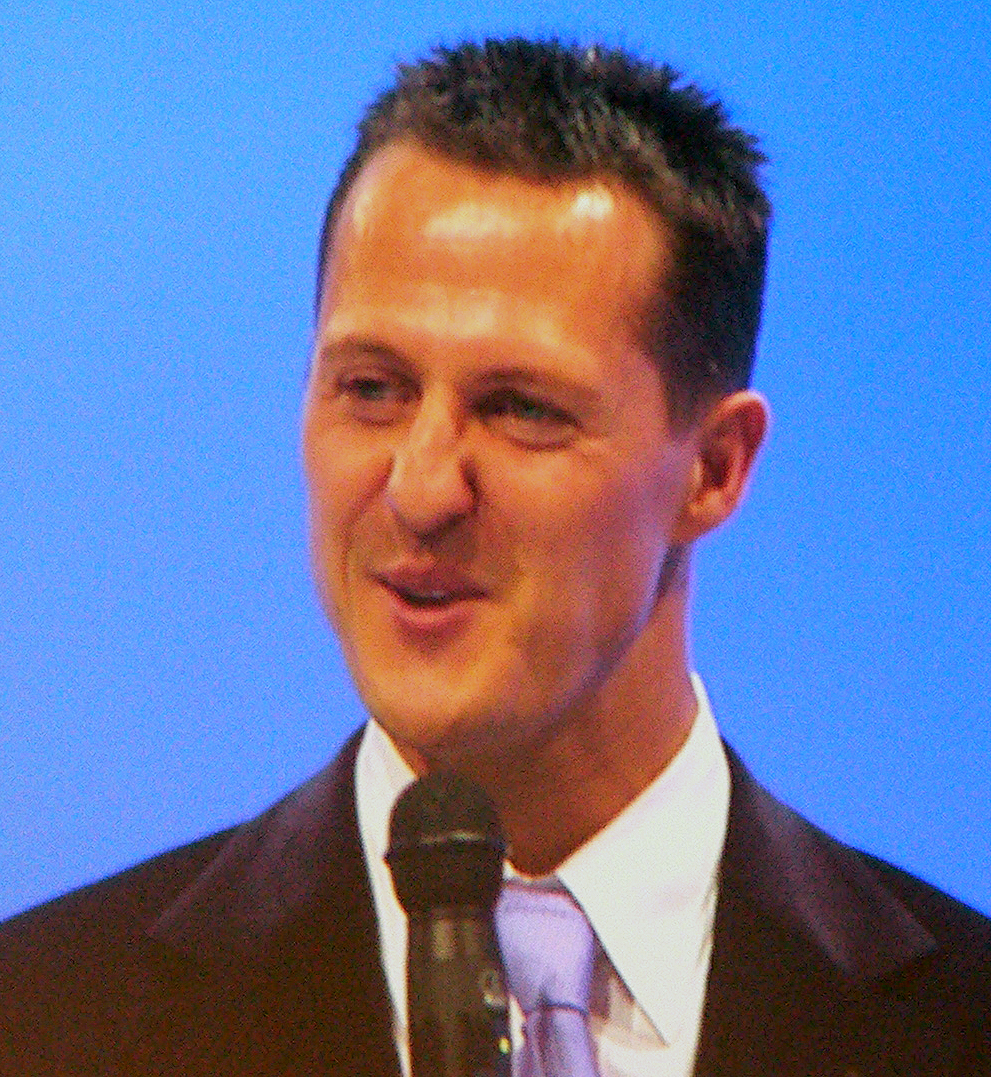
Michael Schumacher (pictured in 2007) qualified on pole position for the 40th time in his Formula One career.

Saturday's afternoon one hour qualifying session saw each driver was limited to twelve laps, with the starting order decided by their fastest laps. During this session, the 107% rule was in effect, which necessitated each driver to set a time within 107 per cent of the quickest lap to qualify for the race. About an hour before qualifying, the rain ceased and it became sunny. The track swiftly dried, but no driver went onto it for the first 24 minutes because nobody wanted to begin drying the racing line; Competitors waited for the track temperatures to rise for the circuit to be suitably dry. Michelin-shod teams underperformed Bridgestone-shod squads because their tyres performed less well in colder weather. Lap times progressively got faster during qualifying, and every driver eclipsed the 2000 pole lap. On his third run, Michael Schumacher took the 40th pole position of his career and his eighth in 11 races in 2001, with a qualifying lap record of 1:20.477 with seven minutes left, despite running slightly wide at Stowe corner. He noted that qualifying was challenging for him, and he used his first two quick laps to fine-tune his car's set-up because of the lack of dry track running during Saturday practice. Häkkinen took second, 0.082 seconds behind Michael Schumacher, and held pole until the latter's quickest lap. He lost time after being held up by a Benetton car on his final quick run, believing he lost the chance to take pole position. Coulthard took third and said he could not find the best balance for his McLaren before qualifying ended due to changing track conditions. Trulli qualified fourth despite hitting a kerb at the exit of Becketts corner on his fourth run, damaging his front-left suspension pushrod. He slowed, then stopped at the side of the track. His Jordan teammate Frentzen secured fifth, reporting no problems with his car. Barrichello was demoted to sixth in the final minutes. He spent his first two runs on his set-up, and failed to lap faster on his fourth run because he was twice blocked by Arrows's Enrique Bernoldi (who was on an in-lap). Räikkönen and Heidfeld took seventh and ninth respectively for Sauber; Räikkönen was pleased with seventh after making minor tweaks to the C20 chassis's handling balance. Ralf Schumacher and both McLarens were driving slowly through Luffield corner, prompting Heidfeld to run across an inside kerb and onto grass, losing Heidfeld three-tenths of a second.

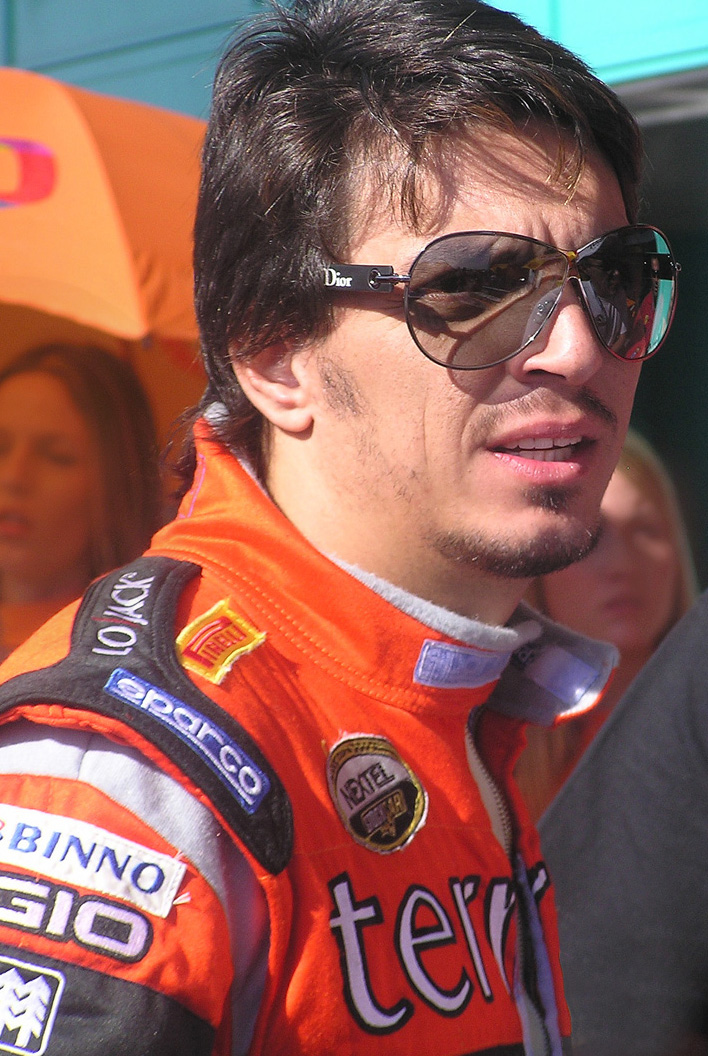
Tarso Marques (pictured in 2007) transgressed the 107% rule and thus failed to qualify for the race.

Montoya separated the Sauber drivers; he bent a front suspension push-rod arm on his first run after clipping the kerb at the exit of Becketts early in qualifying, and he took over Ralf Schumacher's spare car setup for the rest of qualifying. Ralf Schumacher, tenth, expressed disappointment that his quickest lap was set on his second run and was slowed by traffic as track conditions improved. Panis came 11th and said that his car's balance was good, although he experienced an accelerator pedal sensor problem on his first lap, which his team promptly resolved. Villeneuve, 12th, had an engine problem on his first run and drove the spare BAR car until his race car was fixed. He was ahead of the faster Jaguar of De la Rosa, who reported no issues. Alesi, 14th, found the old undertray on his Prost AP04 car gave him more consistent handling and he made minor setup changes. Irvine qualified 15th but had a front-left suspension pushrod failure, forcing him to drive the spare Jaguar set up for De la Rosa. Prost's Luciano Burti had a large amount of understeer, leaving him 16th. Verstappen gradually improved his car throughout qualifying and secured 17th; his teammate Bernoldi took 20th and had a throttle issue on his first run which affected his momentum and was held up by Verstappen on his final run. The two Arrows were separated by the Benettons of Jenson Button and Giancarlo Fisichella in 18th and 19th who lacked grip in the high-speed corners; Traffic prevented Button from lapping faster and Fisichella reported understeer and poor grip. Alonso completed the starting order in 21st. His teammate Marques failed to set a lap within 107% of Michael Schumacher's pole time and was barred from starting the race after Minardi's appeal on his behalf was rejected by the stewards because there were "no exceptional circumstances" to explain his qualifying performance. Marques had a throttle problem with his car, and with the backup car set up for Alonso, there was no time to modify the settings so Marques could use it.

=== Qualifying classification ===
Pos	No	Driver	Constructor	Lap	Gap	Grid
1	1	(Germany) Michael Schumacher	Ferrari	1:20.477	—	1
2	3	(Finland) Mika Häkkinen	McLaren-Mercedes	1:20.529	+0.082	2
3	4	(United Kingdom) David Coulthard	McLaren-Mercedes	1:20.927	+0.480	3
4	12	(Italy) Jarno Trulli	Jordan-Honda	1:20.930	+0.483	4
5	11	(Germany) Heinz-Harald Frentzen	Jordan-Honda	1:21.217	+0.770	5
6	2	(Brazil) Rubens Barrichello	Ferrari	1:21.715	+1.268	6
7	17	(Finland) Kimi Räikkönen	Sauber-Petronas	1:22.023	+1.576	7
8	6	(Colombia) Juan Pablo Montoya	Williams-BMW	1:22.219	+1.772	8
9	16	(Germany) Nick Heidfeld	Sauber-Petronas	1:22.223	+1.776	9
10	5	(Germany) Ralf Schumacher	Williams-BMW	1:22.283	+1.836	10
11	9	(France) Olivier Panis	BAR-Honda	1:22.316	+1.869	11
12	10	(Canada) Jacques Villeneuve	BAR-Honda	1:22.916	+2.469	12
13	19	(Spain) Pedro de la Rosa	Jaguar-Cosworth	1:23.273	+2.826	13
14	22	(France) Jean Alesi	Prost-Acer	1:23.392	+2.945	14
15	18	(United Kingdom) Eddie Irvine	Jaguar-Cosworth	1:23.439	+2.992	15
16	23	(Brazil) Luciano Burti	Prost-Acer	1:23.735	+3.288	16
17	14	(Netherlands) Jos Verstappen	Arrows-Asiatech	1:24.067	+3.620	17
18	8	(United Kingdom) Jenson Button	Benetton-Renault	1:24.123	+3.676	18
19	7	(Italy) Giancarlo Fisichella	Benetton-Renault	1:24.275	+3.828	19
20	15	(Brazil) Enrique Bernoldi	Arrows-Asiatech	1:24.606	+4.159	20
21	21	(Spain) Fernando Alonso	Minardi-European	1:24.792	+4.345	21
107% time: 1:26.078
DNQ	20	(Brazil) Tarso Marques	Minardi-European	1:26.506	+6.059	—

== Warm-up ==
On race morning, teams had a 30-minute warm-up session to fine-tune their cars for the race in dry and partly sunny conditions. Some drivers used both their team's spare and racing cars. Coulthard set the fastest lap of 1:22.994 in the final three minutes of warm-up. He was 0.182 seconds faster than second-placed Trulli. Häkkinen was third, with early pace setter Frentzen fourth. Michael Schumacher, Panis, Räikkönen, Ralf Schumacher, Barrichello and Irvine followed in the top ten. Except for Heidfeld losing control of his car over a bump into Stowe corner and going into the gravel trap eleven minutes in, the session was generally incident-free. Heidfeld was able to return to the pit lane.

== Race ==
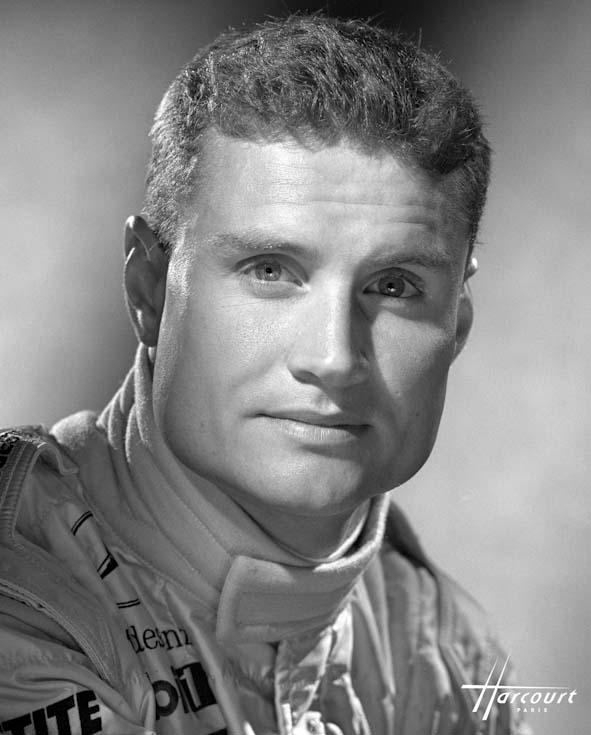
David Coulthard (pictured in 1999) collided with Jordan driver Jarno Trulli on the first lap of the race and retired two laps with rear suspension damage caused by the collision.

At 13:00 local time, the 60-lap race began in front of 100,000 to 120,000 spectators. (Note: Sources vary on the attendance, including 100,000, and 120,000.) The weather before the event was dry but overcast; the air temperature was between 16 and 18 °C (61 and 64 °F), and the track temperature was between 27 and 28 °C (81 and 82 °F). When the red lights went out to begin the race, Michael Schumacher maintained his race lead over Häkkinen with a clean start into Copse turn, despite his car being 100 kg (220 lb) heavier due to a fuel load of 110 kg (240 lb). Coulthard was driving on the inside line into Copse, with his car angled towards the centre of the track. Trulli drove onto the inside line, and pulled alongside Coulthard into the first curve, colliding with Coulthard's car's rear. Both drivers spun with Trulli going into the gravel trap on the outside at Copse turn, and Coulthard veering right across the grass verge and onto the pit lane exit road. Coulthard was able to continue driving despite significant damage to his diffuser and undertray. He fell to 18th, while Trulli retired from the race. Villeneuve was unable to change into a higher gear because his automatic upshifting system failed, forcing him to start manually. He then drove in a gear he did not plan to drive in, hit his brakes hard, locking his front wheels, rendering him unable to steer, and collided with teammate Panis, who retired from the race after entering the gravel trap at Copse next to Trulli's car. Villeneuve sustained front wing, sidepod and floor damage to his car.

Montoya moved from tenth to third by the conclusion of the opening lap when Frentzen and Barrichello tried to avoid the Coulthard-Trulli accident. His teammate Ralf Schumacher gained five positions over the same distance, aided by his car's powerful launch control system and three cars ahead of him going off the track. Frentzen, however, made a poor start and lost three positions before the first lap ended. Verstappen made the best start in the field, moving from 17th to 11th, while Alesi gained four positions. Michael Schumacher led by 0.2 seconds over Häkkinen after the first lap, followed by Montoya, Barrichello, Ralf Schumacher and Räikkönen. Michael Schumacher maintained a modest gap over Häkkinen, who began challenging for the lead. Häkkinen set the race's fastest lap so far on the third lap – a 1:25.861 – to close the gap to Michael Schumacher to one-tenth of a second. Although McLaren were confident that Coulthard could safely stay on the track, his right rear suspension collapsed on that lap due to his earlier accident with Trulli. He spun into the gravel trap at Priory corner, ending his race. Verstappen passed Villeneuve and Alesi for ninth on lap four, as Fisichella went into the gravel trap at Copse turn on that lap, rejoining behind Alonso.

Michael Schumacher looked to lose control of his car at the exit to Copse corner, losing him speed. This enabled Häkkinen to take the lead at Maggots turn at the beginning of lap five; Due to Schumacher's car setup difficulty, Häkkinen began to draw away from him at roughly two seconds each lap. Burti became the Grand Prix's fourth retirement when his engine failed on lap seven and spilt oil at Woodcote ciorner, leading the marshals to wave the red and yellow striped warning flag. He retired after stopping his car on the start-finish straight next to the pit lane barrier, with smoke billowing from it. As Häkkinen extended his lead, Montoya reduced the margin to Michael Schumacher to 1.6 seconds by lap 10. Villeneuve overtook Alesi into Stowe corner for tenth on lap 11. By lap 15, Montoya continued to close up to Michael Schumacher and slipstreamed past the Ferrari driver on the inside to take second place at the end of the start-finish straight, three laps later, heading into Stowe turn. Montoya pulled away from Michael Schumacher.

By lap 20, Häkkinen led Montoya by 25.2 seconds, with Michael Schumacher 4.5 seconds behind. Barrichello was 10.9 seconds behind his teammate and was being chased down by Ralf Schumacher in fifth. Räikkönen had been battling Ralf Schumacher for fifth and was the first driver to make a pit stop on the next lap. He rejoined the race in tenth. The McLaren and Ferrari teams had contrasting strategies: the McLaren team planned a two-stop strategy, while the Ferrari team planned one pit stop. Ferrari suspected Häkkinen would be carrying a small load at the start of the race, whereas McLaren hoped Häkkinen would pass Michael Schumacher and delay him long enough for Coulthard to challenge him at the appropriate time. As he approached slower cars, Häkkinen was summoned to the pit lane by his team to make his first pit stop from the race lead on the same lap. He returned to the circuit behind Montoya but ahead of Michael Schumacher. Heidfeld also had a pit stop on the same lap, exiting in tenth. Montoya led the following three laps before making his first pit stop on lap 25, put under pressure by Häkkinen, who reclaimed the race lead. Montoya was stationary for 8.2 seconds and re-emerged in fifth, getting stuck behind the duel for third between Barrichello and Ralf Schumacher.

With a clear road ahead, Häkkinen built his lead over Michael Schumacher to 10 seconds by lap 27 after setting two consecutive fastest laps. As Michael Schumacher burned off fuel and became lighter, Häkkinen was told that going as fast as he could was unnecessary. Montoya was held up further back by teammate Ralf Schumacher and Barrichello. Seven laps later, Williams team manager Dickie Stanford repeatedly asked Ralf Schumacher by radio and a switch sign on a pit board to let Montoya past. Ralf Schumacher did not let Montoya pass because he believed he was driving fast enough to overtake Barrichello, but was unable to do so. Montoya did not attempt to overtake Ralf Schumacher with an aggressive manoevure. Ralf Schumacher made his only pit stop on the 36th lap, allowing Montoya to battle Barrichello for third. His pit stop took two to three seconds longer than intended because his mechanics had difficulty extracting the refuelling nozzle from his car. Ralf Schumacher rejoined the circuit in sixth, just ahead of Heidfeld and Frentzen, as Räikkönen moved to fifth. On lap 36, Frentzen battled Heidfeld for sixth and attempted to pass him twice but failed because Ralf Schumacher delayed them. Two laps later, Ralf Schumacher's engine cut out, forcing him to retire at the side of the circuit at the exit of Bridge corner.

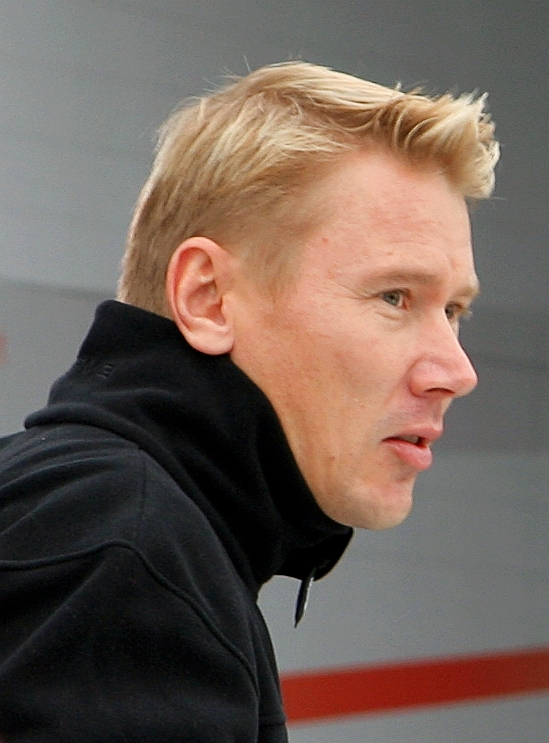
Mika Häkkinen (pictured in 2006) overtook Michael Schumacher on lap five and held the lead for most of the remainder of the race to secure his first victory since the 2000 Belgian Grand Prix.

On lap 39, both Häkkinen and Michael Schumacher made pit stops, with Häkkinen keeping his lead and Schumacher emerging in fourth, dropping teammate Barrichello and Montoya in the duel for second at Becketts Corner. Montoya was unable to pass Barrichello, who was able to draw away due to a light fuel load. Three laps later, Montoya entered the pit lane for his second pit stop, lasting 10.9 seconds. Montoya's stop took two to three seconds longer than usual due to undershooting his pit box by 2 ft (0.61 m), tyre installation troubles and fuel nozzle removal. Barrichello made his one and only pit stop on lap 43. The stop lasted 8.5 seconds and fell to third, ahead of Montoya, as he drove quickly on the lap of his pit stop. On that lap, Alonso, who was battling the Benetton drivers and Bernoldi for position, had his left-front wheel become detached from his Minardi without warning near the pit lane entry. The wheel rolled into a gravel trap before hitting a tyre wall at Woodcote corner, making his pit stop longer than intended. Further back, Bernoldi and Fisichella completed their second pit stops, and both drivers exited the pit lane side-by-side, with Bernoldi slowing to prevent a collision and allowing Fisichella to pass. The stewards opted not to reprimand Bernoldi after consulting with Arrows team members.

Irvine was the final driver to make a pit stops for fuel and tyres on lap 47. He returned to the circuit in ninth. At the end of the same lap, after the scheduled pit stops, Häkkinen led Michael Schumacher by 23.9 seconds, followed by Barrichello, Montoya, Räikkönen, and Heidfeld. Häkkinen continued to lap consistently faster than Michael Schumacher, stretching his lead to 33.6 seconds by the race's end on lap 60, despite slowing slightly on the final lap due to reliability concerns stemming from losing the Spanish Grand Prix earlier in the season. It was his first victory since the 2000 Belgian Grand Prix and his 19th in Formula One. Michael Schumacher chose not to challenge Häkkinen, finishing second, 25.6 seconds ahead of teammate Barrichello in third. Montoya was the last driver on the lead lap in fourth, having fallen behind Barrichello on his final set of tyres. Räikkonen finished fifth, outperforming teammate Heidfeld, who earned the final championship point by finishing sixth. Frentzen had understeer and was seventh. Villeneuve and Irvine were eighth and ninth respectively. Verstappen was 10th with a failing engine and excess oversteer on his first set of tyres. Alesi finished 11th with a car that lacked grip. De lLa Rosa was 12th following a malfunctioning refuelling machine at his first pit stop. Fisichella was 13th with Bernoldi 14th. Button, 15th, had a power steering failure on lap 15 and Alonso was the final classified finisher in 16th.

=== Post-race ===
The top three drivers appeared on the podium to collect their trophies and spoke to the media in a later press conference. Häkkinen said it felt "really good" to win the race after a challenging season thus far. He also stated that he hoped to win more races before the season ended, and that it was "very important" that he passed Michael Schumacher for the race lead since it would have been "difficult to get the distance and the gap" he needed for both of his pit stops. Michael Schumacher admitted that he had a "difficult day" driving a hard car, but commended Häkkinen for winning the Grand Prix. He also dismissed suggestions from Formula One analysts that he had traction control issues. Barrichello stated he was pleased with his third-place result and that Ferrari feared their tyres would not survive long on the track. He also felt it was the right decision to stay on the track longer than Montoya.

Häkkinen's triumph was well received in the paddock, and the crowd congratulated him. McLaren team principal Ron Dennis commented, "For half the race, we were trying to slow Mika's pace. You have to be careful because drivers tend to make mistakes when they back off but Mika drove brilliantly all day." Ferrari sporting director Jean Todt acknowledged that a one-stop strategy was the incorrect one but he was also complimentary of Häkkinen, saying, "McLaren are strong and Mika is a great driver. I am pleased for him that he has a win. We have always known how good they are and never listened to what other people felt. We never under-estimated him."

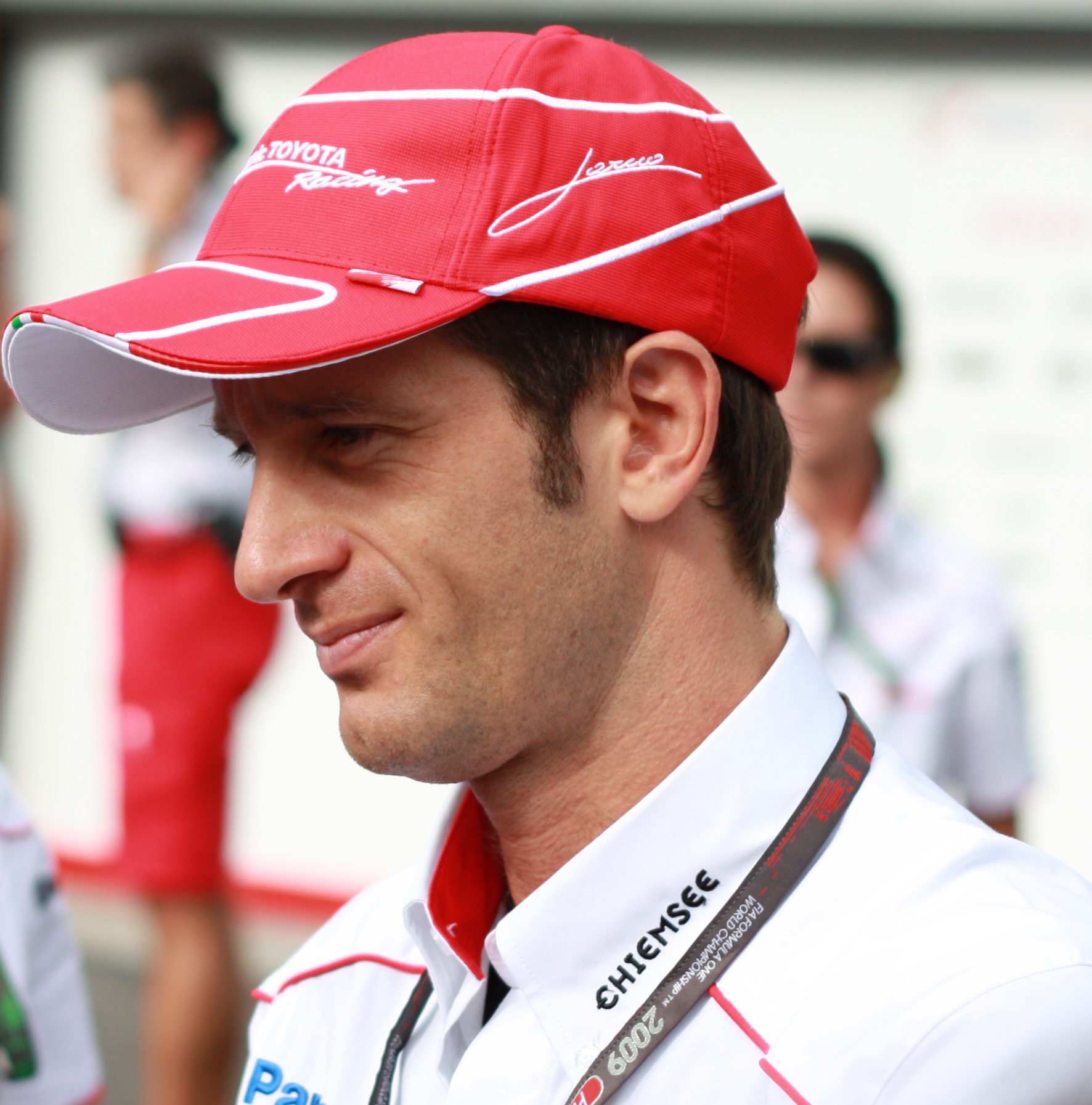
Jarno Trulli (pictured in 2009) called his collision with David Coulthard on the first lap of the Grand Prix "a racing incident".

Coulthard apologised to his McLaren technicians for ruining his car, and they accepted his apology. He attributed blame to Trulli for their first lap collision, "I was ahead of Jarno and I thought I could hold the front line. Two into one does not go and I was in the lead so I think he should have backed off." Trulli labelled the collision a "racing incident" and said he provided Coulthard with as much room as he could, "I tried to get out of the way but there was nowhere to go. It was an accident. I will have a word with him later to clear the air." Dennis contended that Coulthard was ahead of Trulli, however Jordan team principal Eddie Jordan believed Coulthard should have pulled off and that the contact harmed Coulthard's chances of winning the world championship against Michael Schumacher. Villeneuve apologised to his teammate Panis for their collision on the first lap, while Panis described it as "a racing incident and I think we will now try and forget about it."

According to Williams technical director Patrick Head, Montoya would have finished third if his teammate Ralf Schumacher had let him pass when advised. Montoya claimed to be faster than Ralf Schumacher because both drivers were using different strategies and consulted with Williams about it, "They said: 'Ralf's trying to get past Rubens. Turn down your fuel mixture and take it easy." Ralf Schumacher said his team "had the right strategy and we could have been on the podium. This is a weekend to forget in terms of results, but we should also learn from this to try and improve our chances next year. Ferrari technical director Ross Brawn said his team had "a fairly conservative strategy today, which was what we needed" since they were defending not attacking, adding, "Our strategy gave us less possibility to attack, but we did not feel that here at Silverstone we could afford to take more risks."

The race result increased Michael Schumacher's World Drivers' Championship lead to 37 championship points over second-placed Coulthard. Barrichello moved into third position with 34 championship points, demoting Ralf Schumacher to fourth with 31 championship points. Häkkinen's win lifted him from sixth to fifth in the championship standings with 19 championship points, however, he was mathematically eliminated from title contention because he trailed Michael Schumacher by 65 championship points and the remaining six Grands Prix could only award 60 championship points. Ferrari's lead over McLaren in the World Constructors' Championship remained at 52 championship points. Williams retained third with 46 championship points, Sauber fourth with 19, and Jordan fifth with 15.

=== Race classification ===
Drivers who scored championship points are denoted in bold.

Pos	No	Driver	Constructor	Tyre	Laps	Time/Retired	Grid	Points
1	3	(Finland) **Mika Häkkinen**	**McLaren-Mercedes**	B	60	1:25:33.770	2	10
2	1	(Germany) **Michael Schumacher**	**Ferrari**	B	60	+33.646	1	6
3	2	(Brazil) **Rubens Barrichello**	**Ferrari**	B	60	+59.281	6	4
4	6	(Colombia) **Juan Pablo Montoya**	**Williams-BMW**	M	60	+1:08.772	8	3
5	17	(Finland) **Kimi Räikkönen**	**Sauber-Petronas**	B	59	+1 Lap	7	2
6	16	(Germany) **Nick Heidfeld**	**Sauber-Petronas**	B	59	+1 Lap	9	1
7	11	(Germany) Heinz-Harald Frentzen	Jordan-Honda	B	59	+1 Lap	5	
8	10	(Canada) Jacques Villeneuve	BAR-Honda	B	59	+1 Lap	12	
9	18	(United Kingdom) Eddie Irvine	Jaguar-Cosworth	M	59	+1 Lap	15	
10	14	(Netherlands) Jos Verstappen	Arrows-Asiatech	B	58	+2 Laps	17	
11	22	(France) Jean Alesi	Prost-Acer	M	58	+2 Laps	14	
12	19	(Spain) Pedro de la Rosa	Jaguar-Cosworth	M	58	+2 Laps	13	
13	7	(Italy) Giancarlo Fisichella	Benetton-Renault	M	58	+2 Laps	19	
14	15	(Brazil) Enrique Bernoldi	Arrows-Asiatech	B	58	+2 Laps	20	
15	8	(United Kingdom) Jenson Button	Benetton-Renault	M	58	+2 Laps	18	
16	21	(Spain) Fernando Alonso	Minardi-European	M	57	+3 Laps	21	
Ret	5	(Germany) Ralf Schumacher	Williams-BMW	M	36	Engine	10	
Ret	23	(Brazil) Luciano Burti	Prost-Acer	M	6	Engine	16	
Ret	4	(United Kingdom) David Coulthard	McLaren-Mercedes	B	2	Suspension/Spun off	3	
Ret	12	(Italy) Jarno Trulli	Jordan-Honda	B	0	Collision	4	
Ret	9	(France) Olivier Panis	BAR-Honda	B	0	Collision	11	
DNQ	20	(Brazil) Tarso Marques	Minardi-European	M	—	107% rule	—	

== Championship standings after the race ==
Drivers' Championship standings

+/–	Pos	Driver	Points
	1	(Germany) Michael Schumacher	84
	2	(United Kingdom) David Coulthard	47
1	3	(Brazil) Rubens Barrichello	34
1	4	(Germany) Ralf Schumacher	31
1	5	(Finland) Mika Häkkinen	19

Constructors' Championship standings

+/–	Pos	Constructor	Points
	1	(Italy) Ferrari	118
	2	(United Kingdom) McLaren-Mercedes	66
	3	(United Kingdom) Williams-BMW	46
	4	(Switzerland) Sauber-Petronas	19
	5	(Republic of Ireland) Jordan-Honda	15
Sources:

- Note: Only the top five positions are included for both sets of standings.

== Notes ==
Previous race: 2001 French Grand Prix	FIA Formula One World Championship; 2001 season	Next race: 2001 German Grand Prix
Previous race: 2000 British Grand Prix	British Grand Prix	Next race: 2002 British Grand Prix
