= 2001 Hungarian Grand Prix =

Formula One motor race held in 2001

Race 13 of 17 in the 2001 Formula One World Championship
| ← Previous race | Next race → |

Race details
- Date: 19 August 2001
- Official name: Marlboro Magyar Nagydíj 2001
- Location: Hungaroring, Mogyoród, Pest, Hungary
- Course: Permanent racing facility
- Course length: 3.975 km (2.470 miles)
- Distance: 77 laps, 306.069 km (190.182 miles)
- Weather: Hot, dry and partially cloudy
- Attendance: 110,000

Pole position
| Driver | (Germany) Michael Schumacher | Ferrari |
- Time: 1:14.082

Fastest lap
| Driver | (Finland) Mika Häkkinen | McLaren-Mercedes |
- Time: 1:16.723 on lap 51

Podium
| First | (Germany) Michael Schumacher | Ferrari |
| Second | (Brazil) Rubens Barrichello | Ferrari |
| Third | (United Kingdom) David Coulthard | McLaren-Mercedes |

The 2001 Hungarian Grand Prix (officially the Marlboro Magyar Nagydij 2001) was a Formula One motor race held before 110,000 spectators at the Hungaroring in Mogyoród, Pest, Hungary on 19 August 2001. It was the 13th race of the 2001 Formula One World Championship and the 16th Hungarian Grand Prix forming part of the Formula One World Championship. Ferrari driver Michael Schumacher won the 77-lap race from pole position. His teammate Rubens Barrichello finished second and David Coulthard was third for McLaren.

Entering the Grand Prix, only Michael Schumacher and Coulthard remained in contention for the World Drivers' Championship with Schumacher leading Coulthard by 37 championship points. Ferrari were also in contention to claim the World Constructors' Championship in Hungary. Michael Schumacher qualified on pole position by setting the fastest lap in the one-hour qualifying session, and he began alongside Coulthard. Barrichello made a brisk start to pass Coulthard and he tactically delayed the McLaren driver from lap 12 to provide his teammate Michael Schumacher with a significant lead over the rest of the field. Schumacher only lost the lead during the pit stop phases, maintaining the lead for the majority of the race to achieve his seventh victory of 2001 and the 51st of his career. His win confirmed him as the 2001 Drivers' Champion, as Coulthard could not pass his championship points total with four races remaining in the season, and he equalled Alain Prost for the all-time record of career victories.

Schumacher received praise from many in the Formula One community for his title victory and it was headline news in Germany and Italy. Barrichello's second-place finish helped Ferrari win the World Constructors' Championship for the third consecutive season and the 11th time overall. McLaren were 13 championship points ahead of Williams in third while Sauber moved one championship point ahead of British American Racing (BAR) for fourth.

== Background ==
The 2001 Hungarian Grand Prix was the 13th of the 17 motor races in the 2001 Formula One World Championship and the 16th Formula One race in Hungary. It took place at the 16-turn 3.975 km (2.470 mi) Hungaroring in Mogyoród, Pest, Hungary on 19 August. The Hungaroring has been likened to the Circuit de Monaco because it is narrow, making overtaking difficult. The circuit was bumpy and dusty and it did not provide a major advantage to cars installed with powerful engines.

Before the race Ferrari driver Michael Schumacher led the World Drivers' Championship with 84 championship points, ahead of David Coulthard of McLaren with 47 championship points and Williams' Ralf Schumacher with 41. Ferrari's Rubens Barrichello was fourth on 40 championship points, and McLaren's Mika Häkkinen was fifth with 19 championship points. In the World Constructors' Championship Ferrari led with 124 championship points, 58 championship points ahead of McLaren. Williams were third with 56 championship points; Sauber with 19 championship points and British American Racing (BAR) with 16 championship points contended for fourth place. A maximum of 40 championship points were available for the final four races, which meant Coulthard and Ralf Schumacher could still win the title. Michael Schumacher needed to win the Grand Prix, regardless of where Coulthard and Ralf Schumacher finished. Had both Ferrari cars finished first and second, the team would secure the World Constructors' Championship for the third consecutive year.

By winning the race, Michael Schumacher would take his 51st career victory, putting him equal with four-time World Champion Alain Prost and join Prost and Juan Manuel Fangio as the third driver to win four or more titles. He said the championship was not in his mindset in Hungary and was looking forward to the race, "I am excited about the possibility of becoming champion a fourth time but if I don't look it, it's because I am not there yet. How can I be excited if I am not there yet? Only having the possibility doesn't count. I will get excited when it is in my pocket." In contrast, Coulthard was within four championship points of Michael Schumacher entering the Monaco Grand Prix; he finished fifth after failing to move off the starting grid due to a computer glitch. Thereafter, mechanical attrition and one accident gave Coulthard six championship points in the next five races and fell 37 championship points behind Schumacher.

A total of 11 teams (each representing a different constructors) fielded two drivers each for the Grand Prix. There were two driver changes for the race. Having been in one of the Prost cars since the first race of the year in Australia, Jean Alesi completed negotiations for the release of his contract with the French constructor and joined the Jordan team for the rest of the season. Alesi's Prost AP04 was driven by Heinz-Harald Frentzen—whom Jordan sacked before the preceding German Grand Prix—until the conclusion of the season. Both drivers were allowed to familiarise themselves with their new cars in the week before the race. Frentzen and Alesi completed separate 50 km (31 mi) shakedown tests (the maximum amount of mileage allowed under the sporting regulations during the three-week summer moratorium from in-season testing) at the Circuit de Nevers Magny-Cours and the Silverstone Circuit, respectively.

Several teams modified their cars to maximise slow speed grip and traction and setup for the Hungaroring's high-speed chicanes. Minardi introduced a revised chassis for both of its race and test PS01s, which comprised a new titanium gearbox and rear suspension geometry, tested by Andrea Piccini at the Fiorano Circuit. McLaren mounted a secondary wing to the tail of the MP4/16's engine cover above its gearbox and Williams did the same as it installed cooling bodywork on the engine for the first time since the Malaysian Grand Prix. The Benetton and Sauber teams fitted new front wings and undertrays to their vehicles while the former constructor also introduced revised bargeboards and a rear diffuser. Both Ferrari and Jaguar brought a revised high-downforce configuration that was an evolution of the package they utilised at the Monaco Grand Prix. BAR installed a new diffuser featuring two vertical strakes in each side channel, as well as a new floor and front wing. The 003 also featured additional winglets on the engine cover that were used at the Monaco Grand Prix. Jordan brought significant updates, including a new engine cover with a deeper top section and shallower lower section and a revised shape around the rear suspension. The new bodywork was complemented by a new undertray and diffuser. Jordan added a horizontal narrowing chord winglet similar to that of the Williams FW23 ahead of the sidepod inlets. Jordan also modified the pedal arrangement for Alesi's car, as he disliked the left-foot braking technique used by Frentzen and Zonta. Arrows brought a new front wing for the A22 and installed small wings over the rain light and rear axle used at the Monaco Grand Prix. Prost used its double-element front wing from Monaco and added a small wing over the rear axle. Frentzen used Brembo brakes instead of the Carbon Industrie components Alesi preferred.

== Practice ==
A total of four practice sessions preceded Sunday's race, two one-hour sessions on Friday and two 45-minute sessions on Saturday. Friday's two practice sessions were held in hot and clear weather. In the morning session, Michael Schumacher lapped quickest at 1 minute, 16.995 seconds, 0.288 seconds faster than his teammate Barrichello in second. The McLaren cars of Häkkinen and Coulthard, Ralf Schumacher, Nick Heidfeld of Sauber, Jordan's Jarno Trulli, the BAR vehicles of Olivier Panis and Jacques Villeneuve and Kimi Räikkönen for Sauber rounded out the session's top ten drivers. Alesi was restricted to four timed laps because he skidded into a gravel trap at turn 13. Ralf Schumacher avoided curtailing his session after a spin into the turn one gravel trap and reversing out of it. Coulthard understeered into the turn 12 chicane gravel trap and pushed the McLaren's undertray through the bottom of its monocoque on a serrated kerb with five minutes left, causing a four-minute stoppage to clear carbon fibre debris.

Michael Schumacher repeated his morning form in the afternoon session with the day's fastest lap of 1 minute, 16.651 seconds. Barrichello in second closed to within 0.083 seconds of his teammate and Häkkinen third. Ralf Schumacher was fourth-fastest, ahead of Jaguar's Eddie Irvine, Alesi, Giancarlo Fisichella of Benetton, Heidfeld, Panis and Coulthard in fifth to tenth. Several drivers, including Frentzen, Fisichella and Ralf Schumacher, spun or went off the circuit during the session without damaging their cars. After Friday's sessions, Ferrari and Coulthard lodged a complaint with the Fédération Internationale de l'Automobile race director Charlie Whiting over the height of the kerbs at turn 12. Race officials agreed to lower its height by 2.5 cm (0.98 in) on Saturday morning to allow cars to be propelled more smoothly over turn 12.

It continued to be hot and humid for the two Saturday morning practice sessions. Michael Schumacher led the third practice session at 1 minute, 15.466 seconds. His teammate Barrichello remained in second. The two McLaren cars of Häkkinen and Coulthard were third and fourth. Heidfeld, Ralf Schumacher, Panis, Trulli, Juan Pablo Montoya of the Williams team and Räikkönen were in positions six through ten. While the session passed relatively peacefully, Räikkönen stopped on track midway through practice with his car's overheating exhaust system catching fire, which was extinguished by track marshals.

Coulthard was quickest in the final practice session to prevent Ferrari from leading every session with a 1-minute, 15.266 seconds lap. Michael Schumacher could not go faster after going wide onto the grass exiting turn six and later spun off the track at turn 12. He remained in second in front of his teammate Barrichello in third and the faster Heidfeld in fourth. Häkkinen, Trulli, Ralf Schumacher, Montoya, Irvine and Fisichella were fifth through tenth. Seven minutes into the session, Ralf Schumacher beached his car in a gravel trap at turn nine and Minardi's Tarso Marques spun at turn nine.

== Qualifying ==
Saturday afternoon's one hour qualifying session saw each driver limited to twelve laps, with the starting order decided by their fastest laps. During this session the 107% rule was in effect, requiring each driver to remain within 107 per cent of the fastest lap time to qualify for the race. It remained hot and clear with the air temperature from 29 to 31 °C (84 to 88 °F) and a track temperature between 33 and 41 °C (91 and 106 °F). Several drivers waited for 20 minutes before commencing their first timed laps. Michael Schumacher overtook Hakkinen as the fastest driver on his first attempt, having opted to do two timed laps. He set his quickest lap with 20 minutes remaining, taking his ninth pole position of the season and the 41st of his career with a new qualifying track record of 1 minute, 14.059 seconds. He was joined on the grid's front row by Coulthard who was 0.801 seconds slower; an oversteer put him wide at the left-hand turn 13 and Frentzen had earlier slowed him. Barrichello in third was delayed by Montoya early on after which his Ferrari's balance changed and developed more understeer due to rising track temperatures. Ralf Schumacher was the highest-placed Michelin shod car in fourth, and fifth-placed Trulli aborted one timed lap following an error. Häkkinen had difficulty finding an ideal setup for his McLaren and took sixth. Heidfeld, seventh, aborted two of his timed laps through separate minor errors. Eighth-placed Montoya had a power understeer that caused him to spin. An understeer in Räikkönen's Sauber on his last two laps put him ninth. Villeneuve adjusted his car's setup to qualify tenth.

Panis in 11th was the fastest driver not to qualify in the top ten because he lost time with an electrical fault and spun because of an inoperable traction control system. Alesi made it an all-French sixth row in 12th; he admitted he required additional familiarity with his car. The Jaguars occupied 13th and 14th places: Pedro de la Rosa ahead of his teammate Irvine; the former made errors on his first two timed laps and the latter said he over-drove trying to qualify in the top ten. Fisichella in the faster of the two Benetton cars in 15th reported a loss of grip. Frentzen in a lightly fuelled car could not match his form from the morning's practice sessions and took 16th. Two engine failures in practice required Jenson Button to drive the spare Benetton, which had poor grip and balance and left him 17th. Button felt the spare car which featured different steering arms that made it feel heavier to him did not suit his driving style. Fernando Alonso qualified his Minardi in 18th. Luciano Burti of the Prost team had balance problems that caused his car to yearn from understeer and oversteer and was 19th. The two Arrows of Enrique Bernoldi and Jos Verstappen were 20th and 21st; Verstappen drove Arrows' spare vehicle after damaging his race car in a crash during practice and Bernoldi's engine cut out on his final timed lap. Tarso Marques for Minardi was the final qualifier in 22nd as he had a setup that could not be changed for increased car performance due to him replacing a sensor.

=== Qualifying classification ===
| Pos | No. | Driver | Constructor | Lap | Gap | Grid |
|---|---|---|---|---|---|---|
| 1 | 1 | (Germany) Michael Schumacher | Ferrari | 1:14.059 | — | 1 |
| 2 | 4 | (United Kingdom) David Coulthard | McLaren-Mercedes | 1:14.860 | +0.801 | 2 |
| 3 | 2 | (Brazil) Rubens Barrichello | Ferrari | 1:14.953 | +0.894 | 3 |
| 4 | 5 | (Germany) Ralf Schumacher | Williams-BMW | 1:15.095 | +1.036 | 4 |
| 5 | 11 | (Italy) Jarno Trulli | Jordan-Honda | 1:15.394 | +1.335 | 5 |
| 6 | 3 | (Finland) Mika Häkkinen | McLaren-Mercedes | 1:15.411 | +1.352 | 6 |
| 7 | 16 | (Germany) Nick Heidfeld | Sauber-Petronas | 1:15.739 | +1.680 | 7 |
| 8 | 6 | (Colombia) Juan Pablo Montoya | Williams-BMW | 1:15.881 | +1.822 | 8 |
| 9 | 17 | (Finland) Kimi Räikkönen | Sauber-Petronas | 1:15.906 | +1.847 | 9 |
| 10 | 10 | (Canada) Jacques Villeneuve | BAR-Honda | 1:16.212 | +2.153 | 10 |
| 11 | 9 | (France) Olivier Panis | BAR-Honda | 1:16.382 | +2.323 | 11 |
| 12 | 12 | (France) Jean Alesi | Jordan-Honda | 1:16.471 | +2.412 | 12 |
| 13 | 19 | (Spain) Pedro de la Rosa | Jaguar-Cosworth | 1:16.543 | +2.484 | 13 |
| 14 | 18 | (United Kingdom) Eddie Irvine | Jaguar-Cosworth | 1:16.607 | +2.548 | 14 |
| 15 | 7 | (Italy) Giancarlo Fisichella | Benetton-Renault | 1:16.632 | +2.573 | 15 |
| 16 | 22 | (Germany) Heinz-Harald Frentzen | Prost-Acer | 1:17.196 | +3.137 | 16 |
| 17 | 8 | (United Kingdom) Jenson Button | Benetton-Renault | 1:17.535 | +3.476 | 17 |
| 18 | 21 | (Spain) Fernando Alonso | Minardi-European | 1:17.624 | +3.565 | 18 |
| 19 | 23 | (Brazil) Luciano Burti | Prost-Acer | 1:18.238 | +4.179 | 19 |
| 20 | 15 | (Brazil) Enrique Bernoldi | Arrows-Asiatech | 1:18.258 | +4.199 | 20 |
| 21 | 14 | (Netherlands) Jos Verstappen | Arrows-Asiatech | 1:18.389 | +4.330 | 21 |
| 22 | 20 | (Brazil) Tarso Marques | Minardi-European | 1:19.139 | +5.080 | 22 |
107% time: 1:19.243

== Warm-up ==
A half an hour warm-up session took place on Sunday morning in dry and hot weather. All drivers fine-tuned their race set-ups against the weather of the time, and set laps in their spare cars. While he was briefly delayed by a battery fault that affected his car's gear change mechanism, Coulthard led with a lap of 1 minute and 16.915 seconds with the Ferrari duo of Michael Schumacher and Barrichello second and third. Ralf Schumacher, Häkkinen, Trulli, Heidfeld, Panis, Räikkönen and Irvine occupied positions four to ten. Bernoldi was the only driver to lose control of his car during the session, running wide at the first corner and continued.

== Race ==
The race took place in the afternoon from 14:00 local time and before 110,000 spectators. It lasted 77 laps over a distance of 306.075 km (190.186 mi). The weather was hot and humid with some cloud cover, with the air temperature between 27 and 33 °C (81 and 91 °F) and the track temperature from 40 to 41 °C (104 to 106 °F); conditions were expected to remain consistent with a light south-easterly wind and a 20 per cent chance of rain was forecast. Tyre consistency from over the season was predicted to allow for a one-stop strategy and had the possibility of a slower car impeding the leaders for several laps. A two stop-strategy was theorised to give drivers a better chance of maintaining on-track position. While on a reconnaissance lap, Michael Schumacher locked his rear brakes and ran into the turn 12 gravel trap en route to the grid. The Ferrari mechanics removed most of the stones from his car and replaced the left-hand side turning vane as a precaution to ensure there was no loose bodywork and changed his tyres. In the meantime, Coulthard's race car had a gearbox problem and he switched to the spare McLaren for the start.

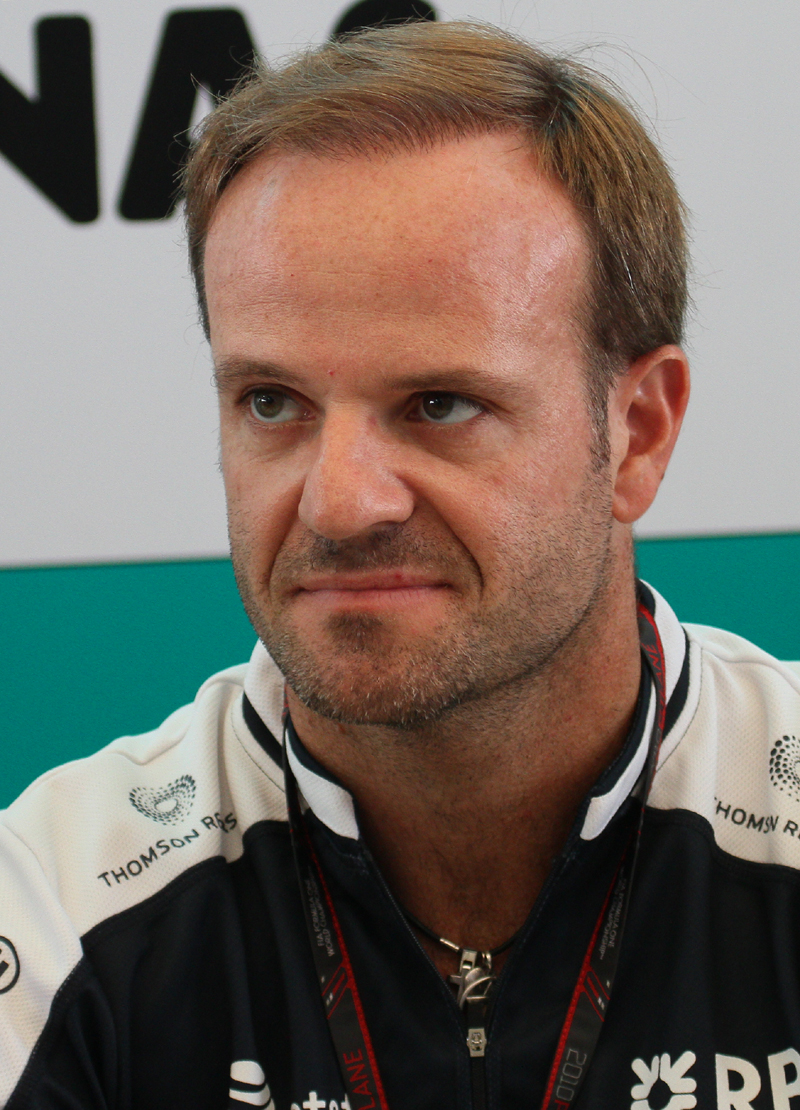
Rubens Barrichello (pictured in 2010) finished in second to help Ferrari win its third World Constructors' Championship in a row.

Michael Schumacher made a brisk start to maintain his pole position advantage. Coulthard in second made a slow getaway on the dirty side of the track, providing less grip, and Barrichello overtook him on his left into turn one. Barrichello then veered across to protect his teammate from a challenge by Coulthard. In the middle of the pack, Irvine attempted to pass Fisichella on the left; he lost control of the rear of his car on some dirt and got beached in the gravel trap. Trulli slowed to avoid a collision with Heidfeld. Further round the lap, Marques ran off the circuit after he and Frentzen made contact in turn two; both drivers continued. Verstappen made the best getaway in the field, moving from 21st to 16th by the conclusion of the first lap, as Frentzen fell four positions over the same distance. At the end of the first lap, Michael Schumacher led his teammate Barrichello by 1.3 seconds with Coulthard a further half a second behind in third. Ralf Schumacher was fourth, Trulli fifth and Häkkinen sixth. As the top three began to pull away from the rest of the field, extending their deficit over Ralf Schumacher to 6.8 seconds on lap five, the stewards informed the Benetton team that Button had jumped the start for which he was imposed a ten-second stop-and-go penalty. He took the penalty on the following lap.

Meanwhile, Michael Schumacher was conserving his tyre usage because he felt going faster would become more important as the race progressed. Trulli in fifth slowed Häkkinen, Heidfeld, Montoya and Heidfeld from the eighth lap as Hakkinen attempted an unsuccessful overtake on Trulli. On lap nine, Burti became the Grand Prix's second retirement after he spun into a gravel trap at turn 14 on heavily blistered tyres reducing grip. Alesi overtook De la Rosa at turn two for 12th on lap 10. At the front of the field, Barrichello began to tactically slow Coulthard by a second per lap on lap 12, allowing his teammate Michael Schumacher to lead comfortably while lapping slower traffic later on. That lap, Bernoldi locked his rear brakes in him catching Alonso and retired by spinning into a gravel trap at turn four. On lap 13, Button passed Marques to retake 18th. By his first pit stop of the race at the conclusion of the 28th lap, Michael Schumacher extended his lead to 12.8 seconds and broke Nigel Mansell's official lap record from the 1992 edition. His stop lasted 8.4 seconds and relinquished the lead to his teammate Barrichello. Michael Schumacher rejoined the race in third, ahead of his brother Ralf Schumacher.

On the 29th lap, Trulli entered the pit lane for his first pit stop. He emerged in 12th after a refuelling rig was lodged in his car for five extra seconds. Ralf Schumacher entered the pit lane on the following lap and he remained in fourth place. Barrichello stayed on the track until at the end of lap 31 to delay Coulthard in second before entering the pit lane for a 9.1 second pit stop to take on 91 L (20 imp gal; 24 US gal) of fuel. The tactic did not work as Coulthard's pit stop on the next lap was faster than Barrichello's and he overtook him. Coulthard was therefore able to drive in clear air and given an opportunity to close up to Michael Schumacher. Further back, Button overtook Alonso for 17th on lap 33. Two more retirements occurred during this stage of the Grand Prix: on lap 35, Button lost control of the rear of the rear of his Benetton car through the final corner, and stopped in the centre of the circuit on the start/finish line. He remained there due to the car stalling because his traction control system failed to operate, engaged in gear, and facing the opposite direction before marshals extricated him under yellow flag conditions. Alonso spun into a gravel trap at turn one when his rear brakes failed on the 38th lap. As Coulthard lowered the gap to Michael Schumacher to 11 seconds, he could not get closer to the Ferrari driver who made a second pit stop on lap 52.

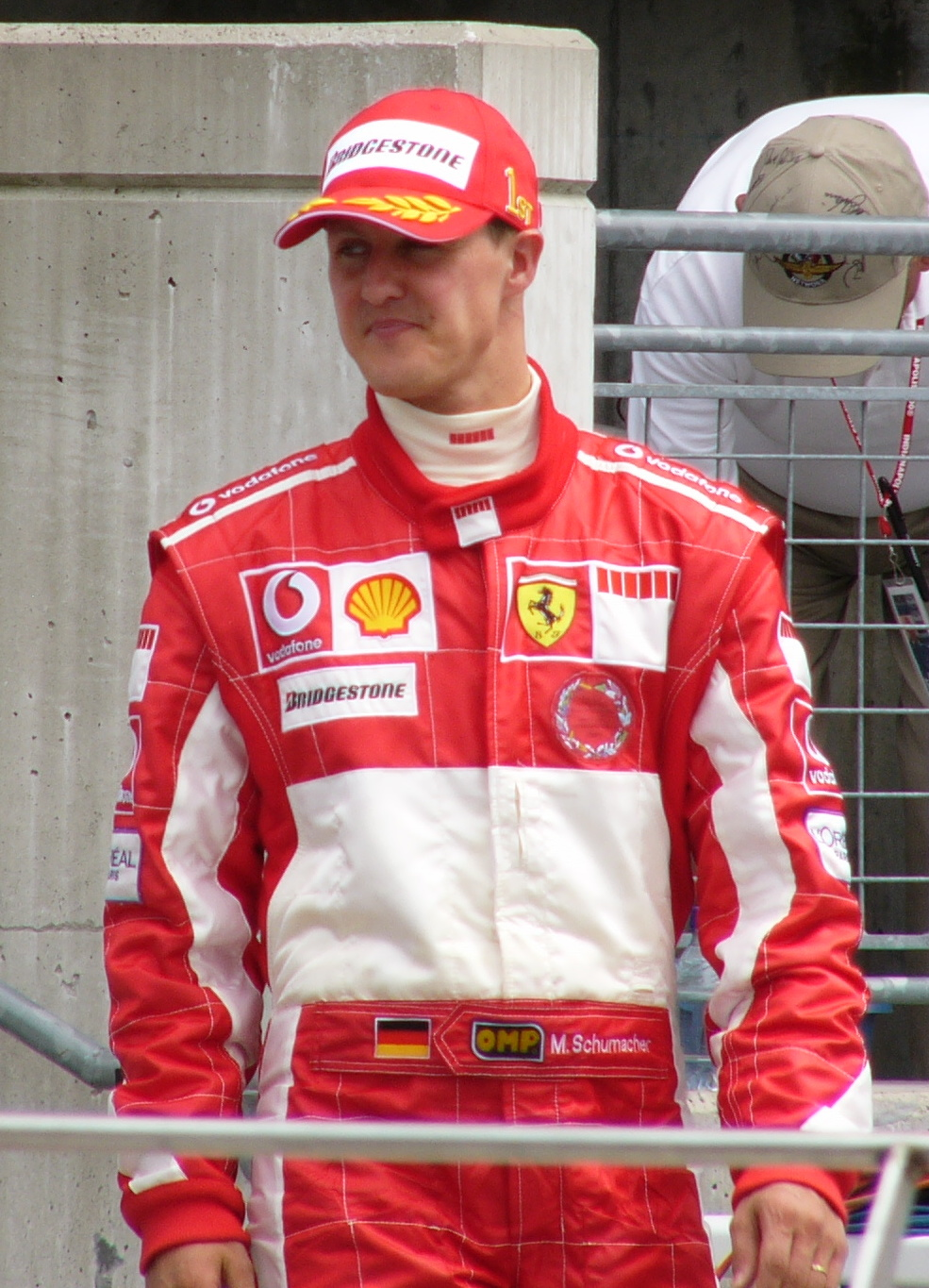
Michael Schumacher, who was crowned the 2001 Formula One World Drivers' Champion as a result of his win (pictured in 2005)

Barrichello made his second pit stop on the next lap, and he rejoined in third, behind his teammate Michael Schumacher. Coulthard led laps 53 and 54 and it appeared he would retain second since the deficit between him and Barrichello was 22.6 seconds. During his second pit stop, the car's refuelling rig was jammed for two seconds. Coulthard emerged in third, behind Barrichello. On that lap, Trulli pulled off to the side of the track to retire with an hydraulic failure. On the 58th lap, Panis drove into the garage to allow his team to rectify an electrical fault with his car. Behind the top three, the fifth-placed Häkkinen, who set the overall fastest lap of 1 minute and 16.723 seconds on lap 51, was two seconds a lap faster than Ralf Schumacher in fourth. He lined up a pass on the inside in the corners; he could not pass because of the Williams' higher straightline speed. Frentzen joined the list of retirees by spinning into a gravel trap on lap 64. Marques was instructed by his team via radio to stop at the side of the track at turn 12 and switch his car's engine off because of low fuel pressure soon after. On the 70th lap, Fisichella's engine failed, causing him to spin into a gravel trap beside the circuit, and forcing him to retire.

Häkkinen made the race's final pit stop for fuel on lap 71. He remained in fifth and fell back from Ralf Schumacher. Two laps later, Panis parked his car in the garage to retire after one exploratory lap. At the front, Michael Schumacher slowed and Barrichello held off Coulthard to enable his teammate to take his seventh victory of the season, and the 51st of his career in a time of 1 hour, 41 minutes, 49.675 seconds at an average speed of 180.344 km/h (112.061 mph), equalling Prost's all-time wins record. He became the 2001 Drivers' Champion and secured his fourth title as Coulthard could not catch his championship points total with four races left in the season. Michael Schumacher also became the first driver to win consecutive World Drivers' Championships with Ferrari since Alberto Ascari in the 1953 season. Barrichello finished 3.363 seconds behind in second to win Ferrari's third World Constructors' Championship in a row and 11th overall. Coulthard took third, with Ralf Schumacher fourth, Häkkinen fifth and Heidfeld sixth. The final classified finishers were Räikkönen, Montoya, Villeneuve, Alesi, De la Rosa and Verstappen. The attrition rate was high with 12 of the 22 starters not finishing the race.

=== Post-race ===
I love you, I love you! I don't have the right words for you at the moment. This is simply amazing. We all love it. It is so lovely to work with you guys. I love you all. I love you all.

— Michael Schumacher, speaking on his team radio after winning the World Drivers' Championship.

The top three drivers appeared on the podium to collect their trophies and spoke to the media in a later press conference. Michael Schumacher called his fourth World Drivers' Championship and his record-equalling 51st career victory "a great achievement" and said comparisons of his three other titles and equalling Juan Manuel Fangio's five titles were unimportant, "I think we want to enjoy this and each one is different and each victory feels different. It's always something special, to win a Grand Prix, to win a championship even more, so that's what counts." Barrichello spoke of his pride at helping Ferrari securing the World Constructors' Championship and admitted to having mixed feelings over falling behind Coulthard after the first round of pit stops, "The first time I was so disappointed and the second time I was so happy, I couldn't believe it myself. I think it was probably the same with DC but just the opposite. Fortunately for me, it worked out. I had a wonderful start." Coulthard was unemotional over losing the title because he sought to win, saying, "It makes no difference to me really whether I'm second, third or fourth, whatever it happens to be. What's important is how I perform in each of the individual races and providing I know that I've given 100 per cent effort from myself, which I know isn't always the case, but that's obviously the goal, to try and achieve that, then I can't do more than that."

Michael Schumacher received praise for his fourth World Drivers' Championship and it was headline news in Germany and Italy. He was officially congratulated by Gerhard Schröder, the chancellor of Germany, who wrote a letter to Schumacher saying that his driving ability brought excitement to the sport and wished him well for the 2002 season. Gianni Agnelli, the head of the FIAT Group, said he was overjoyed with the result, and the president of Ferrari Luca di Montezemolo praised the team for their work over the season. Button predicted Ferrari would continue to be Formula One's dominant team and Schumacher its best driver in the long-term. Mansell echoed Button's belief, adding, "If Ferrari maintain the impetus they currently have and given the personnel... then I can't see anyone stopping them for the next few years, not unless someone comes up with the perfect package." Around 2,000 people watched the event on a large television screen in Michael Schumacher's hometown of Kerpen in the Lower Rhine region with the town decorated in the colours of Ferrari. Church bells in Maranello, the Emilia-Romagna town where Ferrari's headquarters are based, rang with several of the marque's road cars driving slowly and fans of the team celebrating Schumacher's accomplishment.

Ralf Schumacher, who finished fourth, called it "the toughest race of the year" because his vehicle had understeer and oversteer, "I had to work very hard to defend my position against Mika Hakkinen, which I managed to do." Häkkinen apportioned blame onto Trulli for his fifth-place result and said that him setting a new track record was of little consolation, "During the first 29 laps of the race, I was stuck behind Trulli, who was about 1.5 seconds slower per lap than me. It was only after his first pit stop that I could start to make inroads on Ralf Schumacher, who by then was about 30 seconds ahead." Irvine said he accepted responsibility for his first lap accident that ended his running, "I made a big charge at the beginning but maybe I carried too much into the corner and paid the price. With so few races left and only four points earned from the season so far, we've got to address the issues before Spa."

The race result left Michael Schumacher as the World Drivers' Champion with 94 championship points. Coulthard remained in second with 51 championship points. Third-placed Barrichello was five championship points behind Coulthard. Ralf Schumacher in fourth was a further two championship points behind Barrichello. With 21 championship points, Häkkinen was fifth. Ferrari won the World Constructors' Championship with 140 championship points. McLaren in second (72 championship points) were 13 championship points ahead of Williams in third. Sauber were fourth with 20 championship points and the team increased their advantage over BAR to four championship points with four races remaining in the season. After his title victory, Michael Schumacher said he was still focused on winning races, and also considered helping his teammate Barrichello to finish second, something which Ferrari team principal Jean Todt reiterated.

=== Race classification ===
Drivers who scored championship points are denoted in bold.

| Pos | No. | Driver | Constructor | Tyre | Laps | Time/Retired | Grid | Points |
|---|---|---|---|---|---|---|---|---|
| 1 | 1 | (Germany) **Michael Schumacher** | **Ferrari** | B | 77 | 1:41:49.675 | 1 | 10 |
| 2 | 2 | (Brazil) **Rubens Barrichello** | **Ferrari** | B | 77 | + 3.363 | 3 | 6 |
| 3 | 4 | (United Kingdom) **David Coulthard** | **McLaren-Mercedes** | B | 77 | + 3.940 | 2 | 4 |
| 4 | 5 | (Germany) **Ralf Schumacher** | **Williams-BMW** | M | 77 | + 49.687 | 4 | 3 |
| 5 | 3 | (Finland) **Mika Häkkinen** | **McLaren-Mercedes** | B | 77 | + 1:10.293 | 6 | 2 |
| 6 | 16 | (Germany) **Nick Heidfeld** | **Sauber-Petronas** | B | 76 | + 1 Lap | 7 | 1 |
| 7 | 17 | (Finland) Kimi Räikkönen | Sauber-Petronas | B | 76 | + 1 Lap | 9 | |
| 8 | 6 | (Colombia) Juan Pablo Montoya | Williams-BMW | M | 76 | + 1 Lap | 8 | |
| 9 | 10 | (Canada) Jacques Villeneuve | BAR-Honda | B | 75 | + 2 Laps | 10 | |
| 10 | 12 | (France) Jean Alesi | Jordan-Honda | B | 75 | + 2 Laps | 12 | |
| 11 | 19 | (Spain) Pedro de la Rosa | Jaguar-Cosworth | M | 75 | + 2 Laps | 13 | |
| 12 | 14 | (Netherlands) Jos Verstappen | Arrows-Asiatech | B | 74 | + 3 Laps | 21 | |
| Ret | 7 | (Italy) Giancarlo Fisichella | Benetton-Renault | M | 67 | Engine | 15 | |
| Ret | 22 | (Germany) Heinz-Harald Frentzen | Prost-Acer | M | 63 | Spun off | 16 | |
| Ret | 20 | (Brazil) Tarso Marques | Minardi-European | M | 63 | Oil pressure | 22 | |
| Ret | 9 | (France) Olivier Panis | BAR-Honda | B | 58 | Electrical | 11 | |
| Ret | 11 | (Italy) Jarno Trulli | Jordan-Honda | B | 53 | Hydraulics | 5 | |
| Ret | 21 | (Spain) Fernando Alonso | Minardi-European | M | 37 | Brakes/Spun off | 18 | |
| Ret | 8 | (United Kingdom) Jenson Button | Benetton-Renault | M | 34 | Spun off | 17 | |
| Ret | 15 | (Brazil) Enrique Bernoldi | Arrows-Asiatech | B | 11 | Spun off | 20 | |
| Ret | 23 | (Brazil) Luciano Burti | Prost-Acer | M | 8 | Spun off | 19 | |
| Ret | 18 | (United Kingdom) Eddie Irvine | Jaguar-Cosworth | M | 0 | Spun off | 14 | |

== Championship standings after the race ==
Drivers' Championship standings

| +/– | Pos | Driver | Points |
|---|---|---|---|
| | 1 | (Germany) Michael Schumacher* | 94 |
| | 2 | (United Kingdom) David Coulthard | 51 |
| 1 | 3 | (Brazil) Rubens Barrichello | 46 |
| 1 | 4 | (Germany) Ralf Schumacher | 44 |
| | 5 | (Finland) Mika Häkkinen | 21 |

Constructors' Championship standings

| +/– | Pos | Constructor | Points |
|---|---|---|---|
| | 1 | (Italy) Ferrari* | 140 |
| | 2 | (United Kingdom) McLaren-Mercedes | 72 |
| | 3 | (United Kingdom) Williams-BMW | 59 |
| | 4 | (Switzerland) Sauber-Petronas | 20 |
| | 5 | (United Kingdom) BAR-Honda | 16 |
Sources:

- Note: Only the top five positions are included for both sets of standings.
- Bold text and an asterisk indicates the 2001 World Champions.

| Previous race: 2001 German Grand Prix | FIA Formula One World Championship; 2001 season | Next race: 2001 Belgian Grand Prix |
| Previous race: 2000 Hungarian Grand Prix | Hungarian Grand Prix | Next race: 2002 Hungarian Grand Prix |
