= 2001 German Grand Prix =

Formula One motor race held in 2001

Race 12 of 17 in the 2001 Formula One World Championship
← Previous race	Next race →
- Hockenheimring (last modified in 1994)

Race details
- Date: 29 July 2001
- Official name: Grosser Mobil 1 Preis von Deutschland 2001
- Location: Hockenheimring, Hockenheim, Baden-Württemberg, Germany
- Course: Permanent racing facility
- Course length: 6.825 km (4.240 miles)
- Distance: 45 laps, 307.125 km (190.838 miles)
- Weather: Partially cloudy, very hot, dry
- Attendance: 100,000

Pole position
Driver	(Colombia) Juan Pablo Montoya	Williams-BMW
- Time: 1:38.117

Fastest lap
Driver	(Colombia) Juan Pablo Montoya	Williams-BMW
- Time: 1:41.808 on lap 20 (lap record)

Podium
First	(Germany) Ralf Schumacher	Williams-BMW
Second	(Brazil) Rubens Barrichello	Ferrari
Third	(Canada) Jacques Villeneuve	BAR-Honda
- Lap leaders: No race-code specified

The 2001 German Grand Prix (formally the Grosser Mobil 1 Preis von Deutschland 2001) was a Formula One motor race held on 29 July 2001 at the Hockenheimring in Baden-Württemberg, Germany. It was the 12th round of the 2001 Formula One World Championship and the 63rd German Grand Prix. Williams driver Ralf Schumacher won the 45-lap race starting from second. Rubens Barrichello finished second for Ferrari with BAR driver Jacques Villeneuve third scoring his last F1 podium finish.

Ferrari's Michael Schumacher led the World Drivers' Championship from David Coulthard of McLaren with Ferrari atop the World Constructors' Championship over McLaren. Juan Pablo Montoya began from pole position alongside Ralf Schumacher after recording the quickest qualifying lap. Michael Schumacher started fourth, behind Mika Häkkinen of McLaren. The race was marked by an airborne accident going into the first corner involving Michael Schumacher and Luciano Burti for Prost, which caused the track to be scattered with shreds of carbon fibre and the race restarted as a result. Both Williams drivers retained their positions at the end of the first lap, with Michael Schumacher passing Häkkinen for third. Over the course of the race, Montoya extended a considerable lead over Ralf Schumacher. Montoya lost the lead on lap 24 when an issue with a refuelling rig caused him to be stationary for more than 20 seconds. Ralf Schumacher thus inherited the lead and held it to achieve his third victory of the season.

As a consequence of the final race order, Michael Schumacher retained his championship points advantage in the World Drivers' Championship over second-placed Coulthard as both drivers retired from the Grand Prix. Ralf Schumacher moved ahead of Barrichello to take over third position. In the World Constructors' Championship, Ferrari with 124 championship points retained their lead, while Williams reduced the deficit to McLaren by ten championship points, with five races of the season remaining. This was the last Grand Prix to be held on the 6.825 km (4.241 mi) layout; the race would be held on a shorter reconfigured track starting in 2002.

== Background ==
The 2001 German Grand Prix was the 12th of 17 rounds in the 2001 Formula One World Championship and took place on the 6.825 km (4.241 mi) Hockenheimring in Hockenheim, Baden-Württemberg, Germany on 29 July 2001. It was one of two Grands Prix to be held in Germany after the European Grand Prix the month before. Before the race, Ferrari driver Michael Schumacher led the World Drivers' Championship with 84 championship points, ahead of McLaren's David Coulthard on 47 championship points and Ferrari's Rubens Barrichello with 34 championship points. Ralf Schumacher of Williams was fourth on 31 championship points, and McLaren's Mika Häkkinen was fifth on 19 championship points. Ferrari led the World Constructors' Championship with 118 championship points, 52 ahead of second place team McLaren. Williams were third on 46 championship points, while Sauber with 19 championship points were fourth and Jordan were fifth on 15 championship points.

After the British Grand Prix on 15 July, eight teams conducted mid-season testing at the Autodromo Nazionale Monza between 17 and 20 July to prepare for the upcoming German Grand Prix at the Hockenheimring. Ricardo Zonta set the fastest times on the first day, ahead of McLaren test driver Alexander Wurz. Michael Schumacher lost control of the rear-end of his car at the Seconda Variante chicane, causing him to slide along the barriers and his car rested in the tyre barriers. Testing was suspended for one hour for the barriers to be repaired. Ferrari later found the crash occurred by a broken diffuser from riding on the kerbs which created a loss of downforce under braking. Michael Schumacher took a medical check and was declared fit to race. Ralf Schumacher was fastest on the second day where it was held in wet weather conditions during the afternoon. Sauber and BAR went to Circuit Ricardo Tormo for three days where aerodynamic and set-up testing was undertaken. Coulthard was scheduled to join Wurz during the session but withdrew because of food poisoning. Irvine was quickest on the third and final days of testing. Arrows elected not to perform any testing and concentrated on work on aerodynamics at their headquarters at Leafield.

A total of 11 teams (each representing a different constructor) each entered two drivers for the event. There was one driver change heading into the race. Having driven for Jordan since the season-opening Australian Grand Prix, Heinz-Harald Frentzen was sacked by Jordan and was replaced by its third driver Zonta. Frentzen announced he would take legal action against Jordan and team principal Eddie Jordan said that Frentzen's management was unhappy with Jordan's current performance but denied rumours that a heated row occurred. The Schumacher brothers were sympathetic towards Frentzen who felt unhappy about the manner in which he was sacked. Irvine came to Jordan's defence and said that he believed the decision was influenced by problems Jordan had with 1996 World Champion Damon Hill who had similar poor performances like Frentzen. In an interview with The Sunday Independent in 2005, Jordan later claimed that Frentzen was sacked because engine supplier Honda wanted Japanese driver Takuma Sato to race for Jordan in 2002 and to retain Honda's engine supply.

Some teams made modifications to their cars in preparation for the Grand Prix. Williams, Jaguar, Ferrari, Sauber and Prost all brought updated front wings. Ferrari also introduced a new underfloor and brought more powerful versions of their V10 engines for qualifying and the race. Williams installed extra cooling on their cars to combat high temperatures in qualifying. Minardi planned to introduce a new revision to their cars aerodynamic package which included a new engine cover, a titanium gearbox and rear suspension geometry. The team decided to only test the gearbox during the first free practice session.

== Practice ==
There were four practice sessions preceding Sunday's race—two one-hour sessions on Friday, and two 45-minute sessions on Saturday. The Friday practice sessions were held in dry and hot weather. Barrichello lapped fastest in the first session, at 1 minute and 41.953 seconds, late on, going three-tenths of a second quicker than early pace setter, Jaguar's Pedro de la Rosa. Coulthard was third fastest despite going off the circuit at the Clark chicane. Michael Schumacher, fourth, went off at the Senna chicane. Ralf Schumacher, Häkkinen, Williams' Juan Pablo Montoya, Eddie Irvine (Jaguar), Giancarlo Fisichella (Benetton) and Jordan's Jarno Trulli followed in positions five through ten. Other drivers went off the circuit during the session.

In the second practice session, Irvine reset the circuit lap record at 1:41.424 25 minutes in. He was ahead of Montoya in second who had extra wing and a stiffer rear-end to deal with an understeer he had been affected by. Häkkinen ran with a heavy fuel load and was the highest-placed Bridgestone-shod entrant in third, with Barrichello fourth. Michael Schumacher took fifth place, running wide at the circuit's chicanes which prevented him from setting a quicker lap. De la Rosa, whose car developed an engine hydraulics issue, Coulthard, Prost's Jean Alesi, Trulli. and Ralf Schumacher, who collided with the Sudkurve tyre barrier after going wide in the stadium section and hitting a kerb during his first time lap after five minutes, followed in the top ten. Tarso Marques lost control of his Minardi car at the Ostkurve corner and his teammate Fernando Alonso drove into the gravel in avoidance. Both cars sustained no major damage.

The weather remained hot and dry for the Saturday practice sessions. Michael Schumacher was quickest in the third session, with a time of 1:39.937. Barrichello was second quickest, almost half a second slower than Michael Schumacher. The two Williams drivers were third and fourth; Ralf Schumacher ahead of Montoya. Coulthard secured the fifth fastest time, two-tenths of a second faster than teammate Häkkinen in sixth. Sauber's Nick Heidfeld, Jacques Villeneuve of British American Racing (BAR), Irvine and Sauber's Kimi Räikkönen rounded out the top ten. Benetton driver Jenson Button did not set a time. Häkkinen understeered wide into the gravel and grass at Agip turn during his first quick lap and he was delayed in the pit lane while gravel was removed from his car.

In the final practice session, Ralf Schumacher lapped fastest at 1:39.188 that he recorded 22 minutes into the session, almost three-tenths of a second quicker than teammate Montoya in second. Montoya attempted to better his teammate's lap but slowed and set his best lap on his next attempt. Michael Schumacher was unable to better his lap time from the preceding session and he fell to third. Häkkinen was fourth-fastest; Heidfeld fifth; Barrichello sixth; Irvine seventh and Panis eighth. Coulthard, who beached his McLaren in the Agip corner gravel trap and spent most of the session in the pit lane after pushing his car back to that area, was ninth and Trulli tenth.

== Qualifying ==
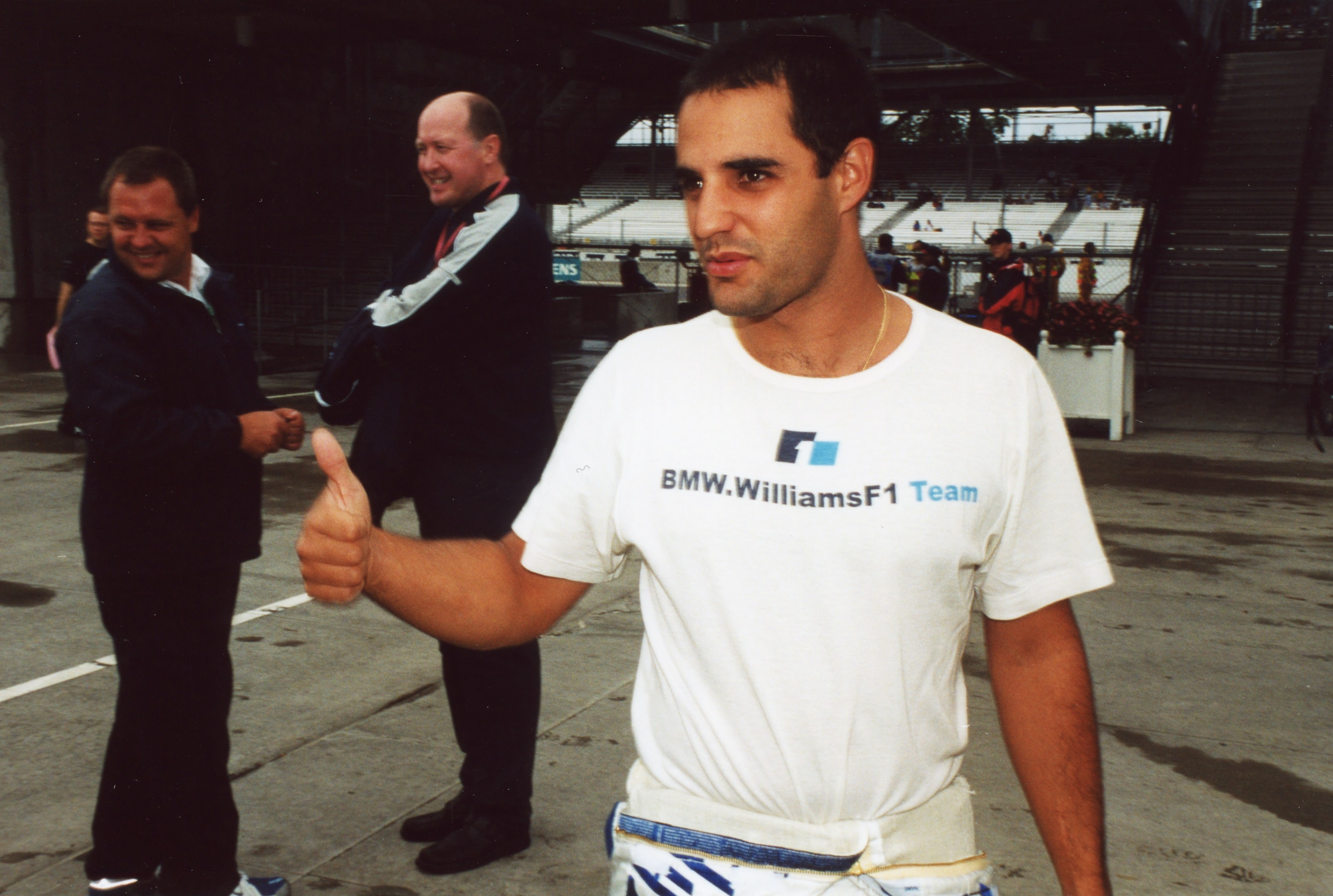
Juan Pablo Montoya (pictured in 2002) took the first pole position of his career.

Saturday's afternoon one hour qualifying session saw each driver limited to twelve laps, with the starting order decided by the drivers' fastest laps. During this session, the 107% rule was in effect, which necessitated each driver set a time within 107 per cent of the quickest lap to qualify for the race. The session was held in dry and hot weather conditions; conditions were expected to be warmer for qualifying. Montoya clinched his first pole position of his Formula One career, with a track lap record of 1:38.117. Although he was pleased with his starting position, he was surprised at his team's performance in qualifying; Montoya lost two-tenths of a second in the second sector and found time in the stadium section. He was joined on the grid's front row by teammate Ralf Schumacher whose lap was 0.019 seconds slower than Montoya who displaced Schumacher from pole just after halfway through qualifying. It marked the first time since the 1997 British Grand Prix that both Williams cars began a Formula One race from the first two starting positions. Häkkinen used three sets of tyres in qualifying third and praised the handling of his car for his good performance. Michael Schumacher secured fourth and was disappointed not to be ahead of the two McLaren cars. Coulthard, fifth, had tyre blistering caused by a loose rear and conserved his tyre use by abandoning his final run. Barrichello managed sixth having been unable to improve his time because of a spin. Behind the leading six, the two Sauber cars were seventh and eighth, Heidfeld qualifying in front of Räikkönen, with both drivers having their cars modified helping them to run faster (Heidfeld adjusted his set-up while Räikkönen raised his ride height for his third run).

De la Rosa and Irvine qualified in ninth and eleventh positions respectively for Jaguar; the pair were separated by Trulli whose engine failed on his third run and could not return to the pit lane to use his team's spare car. The three drivers were ahead of Villeneuve in the faster BAR car, who in turn, was ahead of teammate Panis; both drivers struggled to find grip throughout qualifying. Alesi qualified 14th, more than four-tenths of a second in front of Prost teammate Luciano Burti due to a setup change by Burti for his first run; the latter spun off in the circuit's stadium section and hit the barrier backwards which caused a yellow flag to be shown and prevented any lap time improvement. The two were split by Zonta's slower Jordan car who mounted a kerb at the Senna chicane on his third run, which lost him time and he encountered Panis in the stadium section. Fisichella took 17th and his teammate Button was 18th. Button's car had its gearbox changed in the morning and he pulled to the side of the track with a failed engine on his final timed lap. Fisichella encountered a slower car on his final lap. Behind them, the Arrows drivers managed to qualify in 18th and 19th because their cars lacked power; Enrique Bernoldi qualifying ahead of Jos Verstappen. Bernoldi improved his car's handling although his potential best run was disrupted because of Button's engine failure and Verstappen spun on his final timed lap. The starting order was completed by Alonso and Marques in the Minardi cars due to them being underpowered; Marques first run was affected by a gear selection fault and came across a spun car during his final run.

=== Qualifying classification ===
Pos	No	Driver	Constructor	Lap	Gap	Grid
1	6	(Colombia) Juan Pablo Montoya	Williams-BMW	1:38.117	—	1
2	5	(Germany) Ralf Schumacher	Williams-BMW	1:38.136	+0.019	2
3	3	(Finland) Mika Häkkinen	McLaren-Mercedes	1:38.811	+0.694	3
4	1	(Germany) Michael Schumacher	Ferrari	1:38.941	+0.824	4
5	4	(United Kingdom) David Coulthard	McLaren-Mercedes	1:39.574	+1.457	5
6	2	(Brazil) Rubens Barrichello	Ferrari	1:39.682	+1.565	6
7	16	(Germany) Nick Heidfeld	Sauber-Petronas	1:39.921	+1.804	7
8	17	(Finland) Kimi Räikkönen	Sauber-Petronas	1:40.072	+1.955	8
9	19	(Spain) Pedro de la Rosa	Jaguar-Cosworth	1:40.265	+2.148	9
10	12	(Italy) Jarno Trulli	Jordan-Honda	1:40.322	+2.205	10
11	18	(United Kingdom) Eddie Irvine	Jaguar-Cosworth	1:40.371	+2.254	11
12	10	(Canada) Jacques Villeneuve	BAR-Honda	1:40.437	+2.320	12
13	9	(France) Olivier Panis	BAR-Honda	1:40.610	+2.493	13
14	22	(France) Jean Alesi	Prost-Acer	1:40.740	+2.623	14
15	11	(Brazil) Ricardo Zonta	Jordan-Honda	1:41.174	+3.057	15
16	23	(Brazil) Luciano Burti	Prost-Acer	1:41.213	+3.096	16
17	7	(Italy) Giancarlo Fisichella	Benetton-Renault	1:41.299	+3.182	17
18	8	(United Kingdom) Jenson Button	Benetton-Renault	1:41.438	+3.321	18
19	15	(Brazil) Enrique Bernoldi	Arrows-Asiatech	1:41.668	+3.551	19
20	14	(Netherlands) Jos Verstappen	Arrows-Asiatech	1:41.870	+3.753	20
21	21	(Spain) Fernando Alonso	Minardi-European	1:41.913	+3.796	21
22	20	(Brazil) Tarso Marques	Minardi-European	1:42.716	+4.599	22
107% time: 1:44.985

== Warm-up ==
The drivers took to the track at 09:30 Central European Summer Time (UTC+2) for a 30-minute warm-up session in clear weather. Ralf Schumacher set the fastest time of the session at 1:42.621 on his final lap after leading for much of warm-up. His teammate Montoya finished with the second fastest time at the session's end. Coulthard was third quickest, and Michael Schumacher completed the top four, one-tenth of a second behind Ralf Schumacher. Alonso spun at the Sudkurve corner and skated across the gravel trap towards the tyre barriers. Trulli's engine failed exiting the Ostkurve corner during his third lap and he parked his car onto the grass before returning to the pit lane ten minutes later to drive the spare car. Not long after Zonta made contact with the tyre barrier at Sudkurve turn in the stadium section after spinning into the gravel. Alonso struck the tyre barrier sideways close to Zonta. His Minardi teammate Marques spun into the gravel at Ostkurve corner but avoided damaging his car; he narrowly avoided Burti.

== Race ==
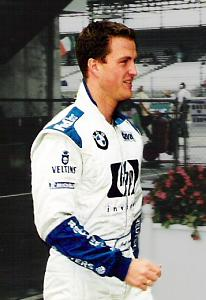
Ralf Schumacher (pictured in 2002) took his third victory of the season.

The weather conditions on the grid were dry before the race; the air temperature was 28 °C (82 °F) and the track temperature 32 °C (90 °F). The race commenced at 14:00 local time. It lasted 45 laps over a distance of 307.125 km (190.839 mi). Approximately 100,000 spectators attended the Grand Prix. As all 22 drivers were preparing to begin the formation lap, Alonso and Marques began from the pit lane due to fuel leaking from the refuelling values. Alonso drove the spare Minardi car with Marques using his teammate's repaired vehicle. Michael Schumacher began to be affected by a gearbox selection problem while on the parade lap which the Ferrari team had hoped was slow-speed related.

Both Williams drivers maintained first and second entering the first turn. Further back, Michael Schumacher slowed due to his gearbox selection fault that prevented him from shifting out of first gear and he drove in a straight line in the middle of the circuit. This resulted in drivers being required to swerve to avoid Schumacher. As Panis was blocking his view and Zonta driving to the left, Burti was unable to view the Ferrari and struck it. Burti struck Schumacher's right-rear wheel and went five feet into the air. He barrel rolled to the right, over the top of Bernoldi's vehicle, struck the ground and landed upright after rolling. Burti landed upright between both Arrows cars; his left-front wheel (which detached in the collision) broke Bernoldi's engine cover and rear wing. Burti's car bounced across the gravel trap and rested on the Nordkurve corner left-hand tyre barriers. Schumacher's car was on the middle of the circuit. FIA race director Charlie Whiting deployed the safety car before he red-flagged the race because of the hazard of tyre punctures at high speed as the field entered the first turn to start the second lap. The safety car driver had reported the plethora of sharp carbon fibre composite strands that were scattered across the track that drivers had to drive around and marshals were needed to remove the debris.

Burti and Michael Schumacher were not injured but their cars had been damaged beyond repair, and raced their team's spare vehicles. The Minardi cars underwent further repairs and both drivers started on the grid for the restart at 14:24 local time. Michelin instructed teams that ran their tyres to change them due to the risk of a puncture. Barrichello's rear wing was replaced after Häkkinen made contact with him, for which the latter apologised. At the restart, Montoya and Ralf Schumacher again held their positions, while Häkkinen led the Ferrari cars and his teammate Coulthard entering the first corner. Further down the field, De la Rosa lost control of his Jaguar as he braked late into the Clark chicane entry and hit Heidfeld's car. Both De la Rosa and Heidfeld retired from the race. Michael Schumacher took third from Häkkinen into the same area. Going into the stadium section, Barrichello passed Coulthard on the outside for fifth after a short battle for the position. Verstappen moved from 20th to 11th by the first lap's conclusion, while Button made up five positions over the same distance. As the drivers completed lap one, Montoya led Ralf Schumacher by 1.4 seconds, who was followed in turn by, Michael Schumacher, Häkkinen, Barrichello, Coulthard, Räikkönen and Irvine.

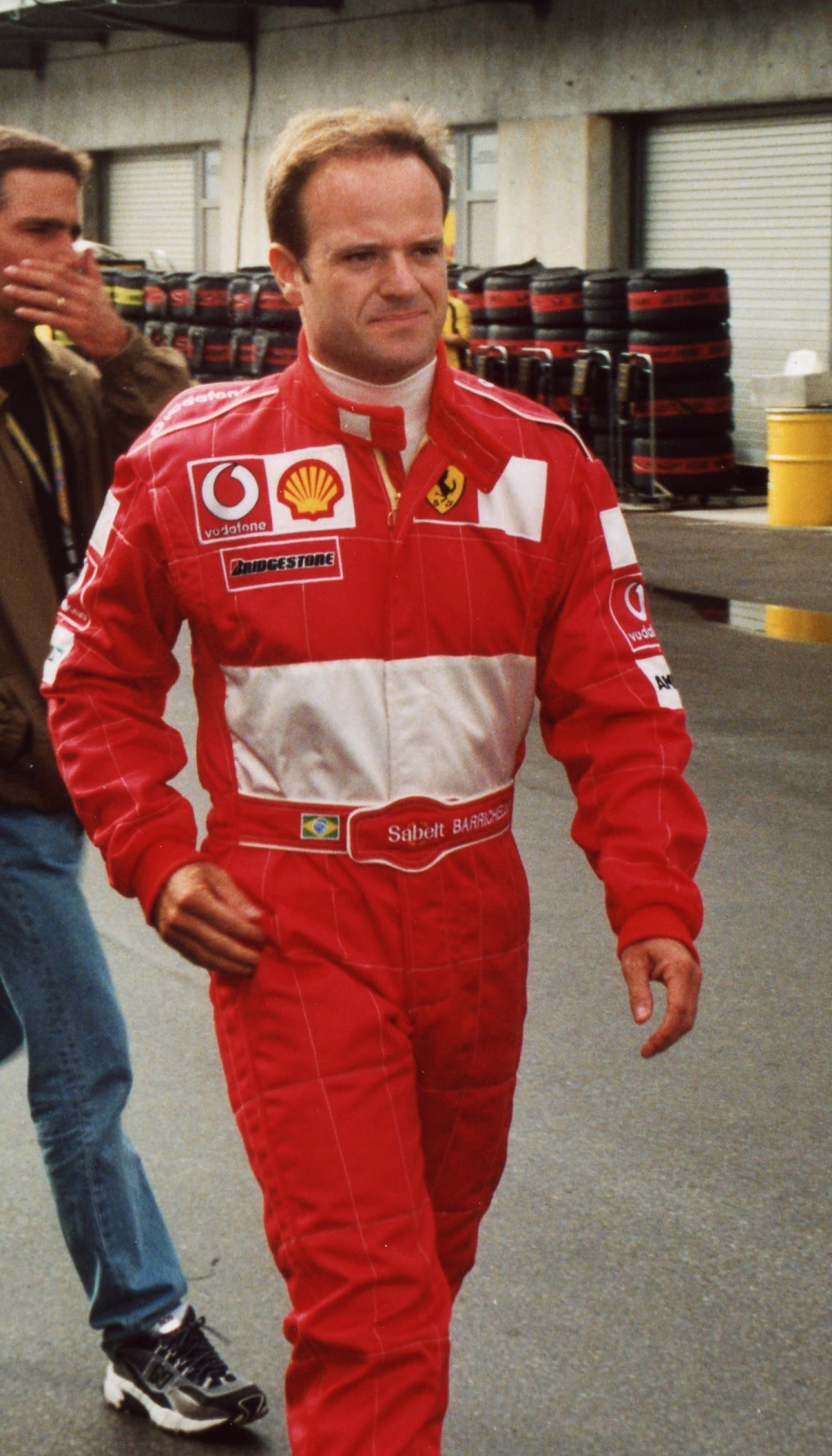
Rubens Barrichello (pictured in 2002) finished second.

Montoya began to gradually pull away from Ralf Schumacher. Bernoldi passed Fisichella for 15th on lap two. Barrichello overtook Häkkinen on the outside on the straight leading to the Ostkurve chicane for third a lap later. Further down the field, Button lost 13th to a pass by Panis during the same lap. On lap five, Panis overtook Zonta for 12th, while Bernoldi passed Button for 14th. At the Senna chicane on lap six, Barrichello moved to third position after Michael Schumacher was instructed to let Barrichello past so that his teammate could overtake the McLaren and still switch places if required. On the same lap, Zonta went into the rear of Verstappen's car, causing Zonta to lose his front wing. Verstappen fell behind Panis after the collision. Zonta made a pit stop for repairs, but retired after driving one exploratory lap due to major damage. Verstappen made his pit stop and rejoined at the back of the field. Alesi passed Burti for 15th on lap nine, and Panis overtook teammate Villeneuve for tenth the following lap. On the tenth lap, Panis unsuccessfully attempted to overtake Trulli for ninth on the inside. Panis unsuccessfully again tried to pass Trulli on the outside during the following lap due to a lack of straight line speed. During the twelfth lap, Panis passed Trulli on the outside at the Clark chicane by braking later than Trulli in his third attempt. Trulli slipstreamed Panis before spinning at the Ostkurve corner trying to reclaim ninth. He fell to 17th.

Häkkinen retired from the Grand Prix with fluid leaking from his left-hand sidepod onto the circuit on lap 15. His retirement promoted Räikkonen to sixth. By lap 15, Montoya led Ralf Schumacher by 8.3 seconds, who in turn was 3.3 seconds in front ahead of Barrichello, as Ralf Schumacher wad dealing with a brake problem. Michael Schumacher was a further 9.2 seconds behind his Ferrari teammate, but was drawing ahead of Coulthard in fifth. Barrichello and Panis was the first of the leaders to make a scheduled pit stop on lap 17 and returned to the circuit in fifth, behind Coulthard. The Ferrari and Williams teams were employing different pit stop strategies – the Ferrari were planning a two stop strategy for Barrichello and one for Michael Schumacher whereas the Williams team were only planning for one stop for both their drivers. Räikkonen slowed on track with a driveshaft failure but returned to the pit lane to retire that same lap, while Irvine retired with fuel pressure problems. Two laps later, Burti lost tenth after spinning and Trulli and Panis passed him. Barrichello unsuccessfully attempted to pass Coulthard for fourth on lap 19.

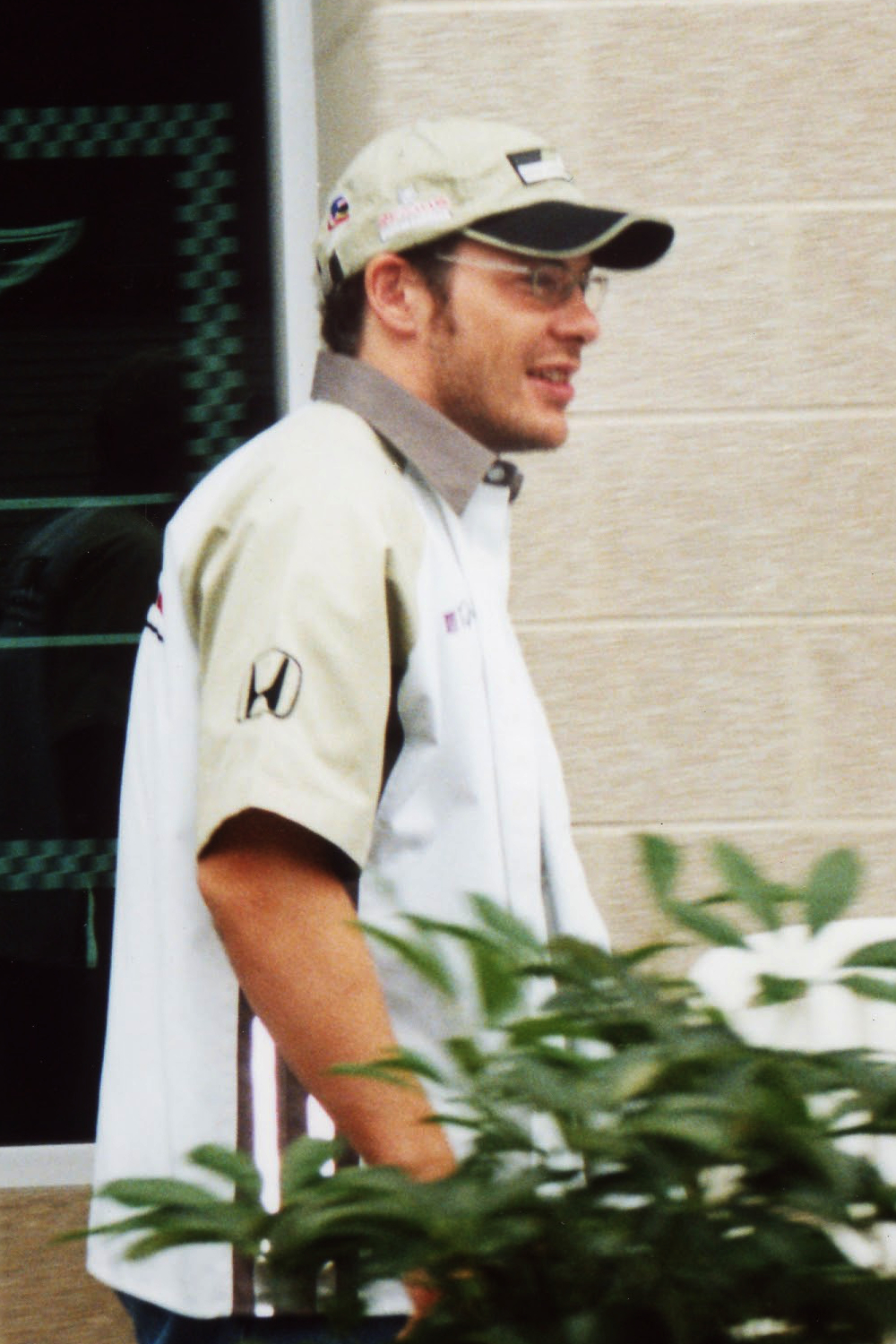
Jacques Villeneuve (pictured in 2002) finished third with what would be his last Formula One podium.

Montoya continued to pull away from Ralf Schumacher—setting the race's fastest lap of 1:41.808 on lap 20—to maintain the lead after his sole pit stop. Barrichello overtook Coulthard for fourth on the outside at the fast right-hand Agip corner that lap. Montoya made his pit stop on lap 22. However, his pit stop proved problematic: the signal lights at his pit box stopped working, causing the Williams refuller to switch to the fuel rig for Ralf Schumacher due a regulator failure. This meant Montoya remained stationary for 20 seconds longer than usual and one-and-a-half times more fuel went into his car. Ralf Schumacher took the lead with Michael Schumacher second; Montoya fell to fourth. One lap later, Michael Schumacher took his pit stop and retired at the side of the main straight with a fuel pump pressure problem. Burti lost control of his car and was beached in the gravel trap against the tyre barrier at Nordkurve on the following lap.

On lap 24, Ralf Schumacher made his pit stop and rejoined with a 10-second advantage. Villeneuve, Button and Alonso all made their pit stops on that lap. Alonso encountered a problem when leaving his pit box: the Minardi refuelling valve had a problem, and his car's afterburner remained on, though the flames extinguished themselves when Alonso accelerated out of the pit lane. Montoya pulled over to the side of the track on lap 25, with smoke billowing from his engine, and retired. His retirement moved Coulthard to third. Fisichella made a pit stop from fourth on lap 27 and fell to fifth behind Villeneuve. Marques retired with a gearbox problem on the same lap. Coulthard made a pit stop on lap 28 and immediately became the race's next retirement when he accelerated away from his pit box with a blown engine. The resulting event saw him stop at the side of the circuit. Panis made his pit stop on the 32nd lap and emerged behind Button and Alesi. Barrichello became the final driver to make a scheduled pit stop a lap later and was delayed for 12 seconds because the Ferrari fuel hose closed itself. This meant Barrichello's team switched to a functioning refuelling rig.

At the completion of lap 33, with the scheduled pit stops completed, the race order was, Ralf Schumacher, Barrichello, Villeneuve, Fisichella, Button and Alesi. Trulli became the final retirement after stopping at the side of the circuit due to a hydraulic pump failure on lap 35. Ralf Schumacher began to reduce his pace by lap 37 but managed to lap quicker than Barrichello. He received a pit board message three laps later which advised him to refill his car's fluids. Fisichella went off the circuit on lap 43 while catching Villeneuve, and both Arrows drivers avoided a collision for eighth. With his closest challenger more than 46 seconds behind, Ralf Schumacher crossed the finish line on lap 45 to secure his third victory of the season and of his career in a time of 1 hour 18 minutes and 17.873 seconds, at an average speed of 235.351 km/h (146.240 mph). Barrichello finished in second 46.1 seconds behind, ahead of Villeneuve in third for his second podium at Hockenheim. Fisichella was fourth due to the high retirement rate, Michelin's hard tyre compound and better engine reliability. His teammate Button was close behind in fifth, and Alesi was 0.496 seconds behind in the final points-paying position of sixth; his car's wing pods prevented him from attacking on the long straights. Alesi stopped his car at the end of pit road after finishing. Panis, seventh, was the final driver on the lead lap, with Bernoldi, Verstappen and Alonso the final classified finishers. Due to the warm weather and the circuit's long length stressing the machinery a lot, the attrition rate was high, with 10 of the 22 starters finishing the race.

=== Post-race ===
The top three drivers appeared on the podium to collect their trophies and in the subsequent press conference. Ralf Schumacher said that it was "a great feeling" when he asked to describe how he felt by winning his "home" Grand Prix. He also revealed that he had brakes issues during the start of the race and that he was ensuring that his engine would last the full race distance. Barrichello said that he was "happy" with finishing in second and revealed that before the race he believed that he would finish no higher than third. Villeneuve stated that he was "surprised" that he achieved a podium position. Furthermore, he believed that more work was undertaken to improve his car than his previous third place in the Spanish Grand Prix.

Both Benetton drivers achieved their first double-points finish for the first time in the season. Fisichella said he was "very happy, for Jenson and myself" and thanked members of his team for his result. Button believed that his team's good result was because of improved changes to the balance on his Benetton. He later revealed that he accidentally removed his water bottle tube from his mouth which caused water to spray on his face under braking. The result led to Benetton technical director Mike Gascoyne to describe the race as "a useful kick-start before the final races of the season" and said Benetton would ensure that the result was not "a one-off". Alesi described the weekend as "a very important one for the team" because of his sixth-place finish. Heidfeld said he felt confident he would have finished in the first three positions had De la Rosa not collided with him. De la Rosa admitted to making an error by braking earlier than usual and said that he would apologise to Heidfeld after underestimating how close the latter was.

Montoya left the circuit without speaking to journalists. He admitted to being "so disappointed I cannot find the words to describe how I feel. Up to the pit stop the race was going perfectly for me." Michael Schumacher shared similar feelings to Montoya: "I am not too disappointed as the situation in the championship remains the same and there is one less race to go. It was a shame not to finish the race and pick up a further six points." He denied reports that television footage showed him apparently laughing when Coulthard retired, saying he was joking with the marshals. BMW Motorsport's technical director Mario Theissen surmised that the two starts and Montoya's delayed pit stop causing the engine temperatures to rise likely caused Montoya's engine failure. Williams technical director Patrick Head was unhappy with the refuelling rigs supplied by the Fédération Internationale de l'Automobile (FIA). One of the rigs was sent back to manufacturer Intertechnique who found no system faults.

After the crash between himself and Burti on the first lap, Michael Schumacher said that although he saw Burti in his rear-view mirrors, he did not know which line he wanted to take and he could not take avoiding action because of his gear selection problem. Burti said that the accident "looked worse on TV" and that he stated his spin on lap 18 was caused because his left arm was aching from the crash. FIA medical delegate Sid Watkins attributed the safety measures made in Formula One since the 1970s for preventing Burti and Michael Schumacher from sustaining a major injury. Coulthard questioned the decision to stop the race by saying: "Accidents or injury off the track is not normally a reason to stop the race. There's lots of races that would have benefited from being red-flagged to give people a show." He also said he felt consistency was needed but accepted that the organisers had the final say on stopping a race. Villeneuve also agreed with Coulthard's view. A spokesman for the FIA confirmed and defended the red-flag decision, saying it was shown to prevent a larger accident. Michelin Motorsport Director Pierre Dupasquier agreed with the FIA's view and stated he was concerned about cars hitting the strands of debris and catching a puncture.

The race result saw Michael Schumacher retain his World Drivers' Championship lead over Coulthard. Race winner Ralf Schumacher, on 41 championship points, moved to third and Barrichello's second-place demoted him to fourth. McLaren's non-score saw Ferrari extend their World Constructors' Championship lead to 58 championship points. Williams retained third on 56 championship points, but were 10 championship points closer to McLaren, with five races of the season remaining. This was the final Formula One event to be held at the high-speed configuration of the Hockenheimring circuit; the circuit was shortened by 1.5 miles and the new layout was used starting from the 2002 season.

=== Race classification ===
Drivers who scored championship points are denoted in bold.

Pos	No	Driver	Constructor	Tyre	Laps	Time/Retired	Grid	Points
1	5	(Germany) **Ralf Schumacher**	**Williams-BMW**	M	45	1:18:17.873	2	10
2	2	(Brazil) **Rubens Barrichello**	**Ferrari**	B	45	+46.117	6	6
3	10	(Canada) **Jacques Villeneuve**	**BAR-Honda**	B	45	+1:02.806	12	4
4	7	(Italy) **Giancarlo Fisichella**	**Benetton-Renault**	M	45	+1:03.477	17	3
5	8	(United Kingdom) **Jenson Button**	**Benetton-Renault**	M	45	+1:05.454	18	2
6	22	(France) **Jean Alesi**	**Prost-Acer**	M	45	+1:05.950	14	1
7	9	(France) Olivier Panis	BAR-Honda	B	45	+1:17.527	13	
8	15	(Brazil) Enrique Bernoldi	Arrows-Asiatech	B	44	+1 Lap	19	
9	14	(Netherlands) Jos Verstappen	Arrows-Asiatech	B	44	+1 Lap	20	
10	21	(Spain) Fernando Alonso	Minardi-European	M	44	+1 Lap	PL^{1}	
Ret	12	(Italy) Jarno Trulli	Jordan-Honda	B	34	Hydraulics	10	
Ret	4	(United Kingdom) David Coulthard	McLaren-Mercedes	B	27	Engine	5	
Ret	20	(Brazil) Tarso Marques	Minardi-European	M	26	Gearbox	PL^{1}	
Ret	6	(Colombia) Juan Pablo Montoya	Williams-BMW	M	24	Engine	1	
Ret	1	(Germany) Michael Schumacher	Ferrari	B	23	Fuel pressure	4	
Ret	23	(Brazil) Luciano Burti	Prost-Acer	M	23	Spun off	16	
Ret	17	(Finland) Kimi Räikkönen	Sauber-Petronas	B	16	Halfshaft	8	
Ret	18	(United Kingdom) Eddie Irvine	Jaguar-Cosworth	M	16	Fuel pressure	11	
Ret	3	(Finland) Mika Häkkinen	McLaren-Mercedes	B	13	Engine	3	
Ret	11	(Brazil) Ricardo Zonta	Jordan-Honda	B	7	Collision	15	
Ret	16	(Germany) Nick Heidfeld	Sauber-Petronas	B	0	Collision damage	7	
Ret	19	(Spain) Pedro de la Rosa	Jaguar-Cosworth	M	0	Collision	9	

Notes

- **^1** – Fernando Alonso and Tarso Marques started the race from the pit lane.

== Championship standings after the race ==
Drivers' Championship standings

+/–	Pos	Driver	Points
	1	(Germany) Michael Schumacher*	84
	2	(United Kingdom) David Coulthard*	47
1	3	(Germany) Ralf Schumacher*	41
1	4	(Brazil) Rubens Barrichello*	40
	5	(Finland) Mika Häkkinen	19

Constructors' Championship standings

+/–	Pos	Constructor	Points
	1	(Italy) Ferrari*	124
	2	(United Kingdom) McLaren-Mercedes*	66
	3	(United Kingdom) Williams-BMW*	56
	4	(Switzerland) Sauber-Petronas	19
1	5	(United Kingdom) BAR-Honda	16
Sources:

- Note: Only the top five positions are included for both sets of standings.
- Bold text and an asterisk indicates competitors who still had a theoretical chance of becoming World Champion.

Previous race: 2001 British Grand Prix	FIA Formula One World Championship; 2001 season	Next race: 2001 Hungarian Grand Prix
Previous race: 2000 German Grand Prix	German Grand Prix	Next race: 2002 German Grand Prix
