= European (engine) =

Brand of Formula One engines

European as a Formula One engine manufacturer
- Founder(s): Paul Stoddart

Formula One World Championship career
- First entry: 2001 Australian Grand Prix
- Last entry: 2001 Japanese Grand Prix
- Races entered: 17 (17 starts)
- Chassis: Minardi
- Constructors' Championships: 0
- Drivers' Championships: 0
- Race victories: 0
- Podiums: 0
- Points: 0
- Pole positions: 0
- Fastest laps: 0

European was a brand of Formula One engines. European sponsored Minardi in the 2001 season and acted as the engine supplier to the team. The engines were Cosworth-built, Ford-funded engines, branded as European.

== History ==
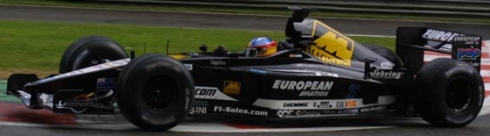
European supplied engines for Minardi of Fernando Alonso at the 2001 Belgian Grand Prix.

European Aviation was a regular sponsor across Formula One and Formula 3000 during the late 1990s and early 2000s, initially with the Tyrrell team, and later with Jordan Grand Prix and Arrows Grand Prix.

In 2001, European Aviation owner Paul Stoddart acquired the Minardi team. It became known as European Minardi, and ran with European branding on the cars alongside the engines being branded as "European".

== Complete Formula One results ==
(key) (results in bold indicate pole position)

| Year | Team | Chassis | Engine | Tyres | Drivers | 1 | 2 | 3 | 4 | 5 | 6 | 7 | 8 | 9 | 10 | 11 | 12 | 13 | 14 | 15 | 16 | 17 | Points | WCC |
|---|---|---|---|---|---|---|---|---|---|---|---|---|---|---|---|---|---|---|---|---|---|---|---|---|
| 2001 | European Minardi F1 | Minardi PS01 | European 3.0 V10 | **M** | | AUS | MAL | BRA | SMR | ESP | AUT | MON | CAN | EUR | FRA | GBR | GER | HUN | BEL | ITA | USA | JPN | 0 | 11th |
| 2001 | European Minardi F1 | Minardi PS01 | European 3.0 V10 | **M** | (Brazil) Tarso Marques | Ret | 14 | 9 | Ret | 16 | Ret | Ret | 9 | Ret | 15 | DNQ | Ret | Ret | 13 | | | | 0 | 11th |
| 2001 | European Minardi F1 | Minardi PS01 | European 3.0 V10 | **M** | (Malaysia) Alex Yoong | | | | | | | | | | | | | | | Ret | Ret | 16 | 0 | 11th |
| 2001 | European Minardi F1 | Minardi PS01 | European 3.0 V10 | **M** | (Spain) Fernando Alonso | 12 | 13 | Ret | Ret | 13 | Ret | Ret | Ret | 14 | 17^{†} | 16 | 10 | Ret | DNS | 13 | Ret | 11 | 0 | 11th |
