= Dickie Stanford =

British motor racing mechanic and manager (born 1956)

- Born: Richard Stanford; January 9, 1956 (age 69); Highworth, England, UK
- Occupation: Williams Heritage General Manager
- Children: 3

Richard "Dickie" Stanford (born 9 January 1956) is a British motor racing mechanic who has since become the general manager of Williams Heritage, a company that repairs and maintains retired Williams cars, similar to Classic Team Lotus.

== Early life ==
Dickie Stanford was born on 9 January 1956 in Highworth, Wiltshire but grew up in Swindon. At the age of 12, he attended the Race of Champions where he gained his passion for motor racing. When he left school in 1972, Stanford worked in the British Government's Ministry of Agriculture, Fisheries and Food and was involved in the work of stock-piling in case of war.

== Career ==
=== Pre-Formula One ===
Along with a friend, Stanford ran a Formula Ford team in the weekends and evenings. His first job in the industry was in Sports 2000 where he was a mechanic to James Weaver and Jonathan Palmer. Stanford later left to work in Formula Three for the Tiga Race Cars team. During this time, he planned to join Williams in 1983 but was turned down after a one-hour interview because there were no jobs available. However, Stanford joined the Ralt Formula Two team who were using Williams' wind tunnel.

=== Formula One ===
In 1985, Stanford joined Williams as the Race Mechanic to Nigel Mansell. Three years later, he became a member of the test team and stayed in his role until 1989 and became the chief mechanic in 1990. Stanford became the team manager after his predecessor Ian Harrison left for the Renault BTCC team in late 1995. Stanford remained in his position for a further 10 years before reducing his work to spend more time with his family. During the 2010 season, Stanford rejoined Williams to return as the team manager for Race Day and Testing. After his spell at Williams Heritage, Stanford started working for United Autosports in October 2020 to look after the Formula 1 car collection of Zak Brown.

== Personal life ==
As of 2003, Stanford lived in Marlborough with his second wife. He has three children. As of 2008, he owned a Mercedes 250SL which he was in the process of restoring.
