= Minardi PS03 =

Formula One racing car

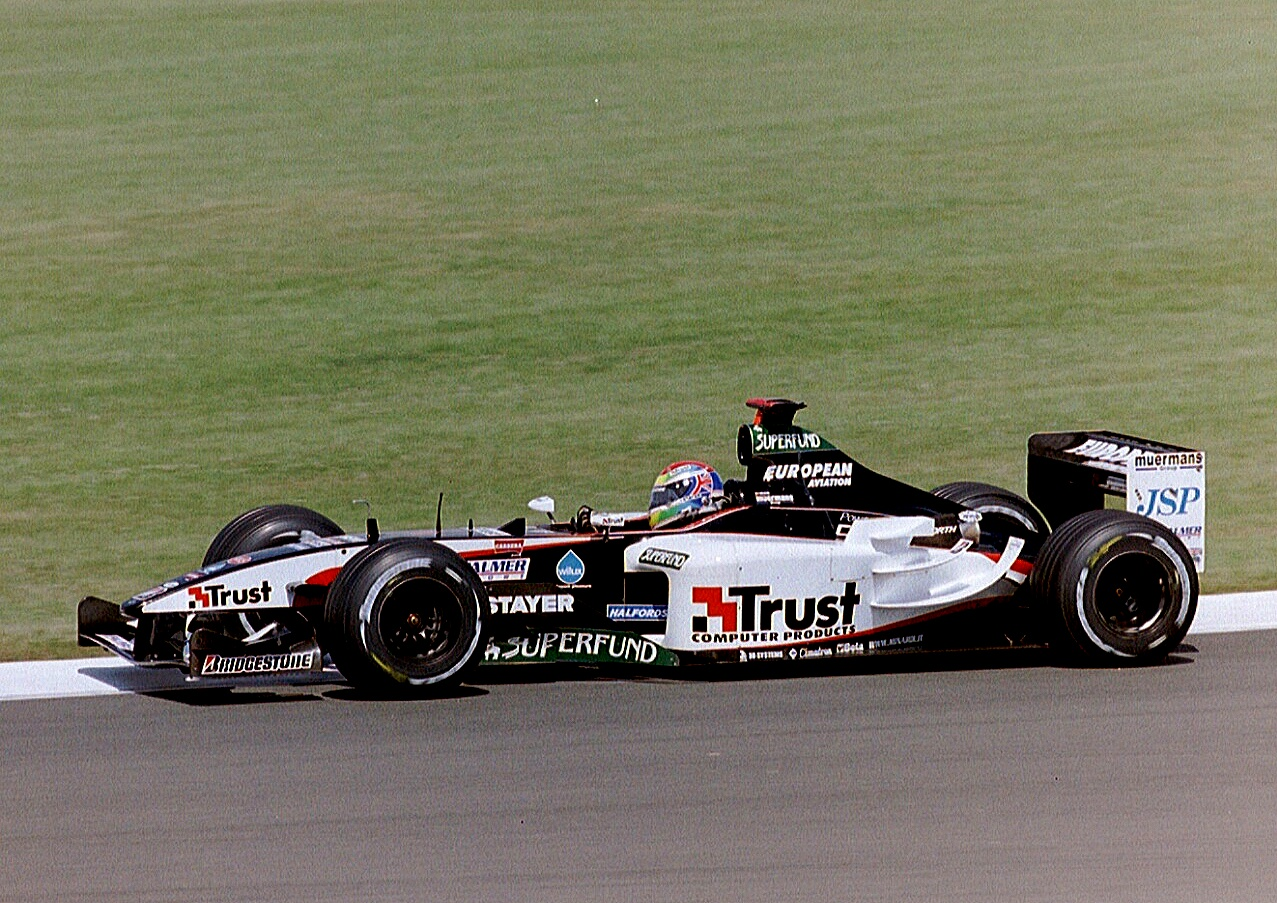
- Justin Wilson driving the PS03 at the 2003 British Grand Prix
- Category: Formula One
- Constructor: Minardi
- Designers: Gabriele Tredozi (Technical Director); Andrew Tilley (Deputy Technical Director); George Ryton (Chief Designer); Loïc Bigois (Chief Aerodynamicist)
- Predecessor: PS02
- Successor: PS04B

Technical specifications
- Chassis: Carbon-fibre and aluminium honeycomb composite monocoque
- Suspension (front): Upper/lower composite-reinforced wishbones, pushrod-activated torsion springs, mechanical anti-roll bars
- Suspension (rear): Upper/lower composite-reinforced wishbones, pushrod-activated torsion rockers, mechanical anti-roll bars
- Length: 4,548 mm (179 in)
- Width: 1,800 mm (71 in)
- Height: 950 mm (37 in)
- Axle track: Front: 1,480 mm (58 in); Rear: 1,410 mm (56 in)
- Wheelbase: 3,097 mm (122 in)
- Engine: Cosworth CR-3 2,998 cc (183 cu in) V10 (72°) naturally aspirated mid-mounted
- Transmission: Minardi 6-speed + 1 reverse longitudinal semi-automatic sequential
- Battery: Midac
- Power: 805 hp @ 17,500 rpm
- Weight: 600 kg (1,323 lb)
- Fuel: Elf
- Lubricants: Elf/CPC
- Brakes: Brembo 6-piston calipers, carbon discs and pads
- Tyres: Bridgestone Potenza

Competition history
- Notable entrants: European Minardi Cosworth; Trust Minardi Cosworth
- Notable drivers: 18. (United Kingdom) Justin Wilson; 18. (Denmark) Nicolas Kiesa; 19. (Netherlands) Jos Verstappen
- Debut: 2003 Australian Grand Prix
- Last event: 2003 Japanese Grand Prix
Races	Wins	Poles	F/Laps
16	0	0	0
- Constructors' Championships: 0
- Drivers' Championships: 0

The Minardi PS03 was the car with which the Minardi team competed in the 2003 Formula One World Championship.

As of 2026, the PS03 remains the last Faenza-based Formula One car that failed to score a World Championship point in the Constructors' standings.

== Overview ==
Minardi announced that for the 2003 season, veteran former Arrows Dutch driver Jos Verstappen and rookie Justin Wilson would race for the team, replacing Alex Yoong who went to ChampCar and Mark Webber who joined Jaguar Racing. Wilson joined the team after a crowdfunding effort by his father, and former F1 driver Jonathan Palmer after Justin had missed out on a drive with Jordan Grand Prix in 2002 due to his height. Minardi agreed to make a car that would fit his frame. It was reported at the time both Verstappen and Wilson paid £2million for their drives. Anthony Davidson, who stepped in to drive the PS02 had been linked with a drive, but declined at the cost. Verstappen returned to the F1 grid after sitting out the 2002 season. Matteo Bobbi was retained for a third season as test and development driver for the PS03.

Previous engine supplier Asiatech had gone out of business, and discussions with Ferrari to provide engines were ongoing through late 2002. Ultimately, the team went with 2002-spec Cosworth engines as the £15 million lease fee for Ferrari engines was too great and the team was forced to redesign the PS03 engine bay (as PS03 initially was designed around Asiatech engine) in order to accommodate Cosworth engine installation due to late deal. The teams supply issues were apparent again, after Michelin stepped away in November 2002 as tyre supplier, with Jos Verstappen arriving to test in Valencia and Minardi had no tyres for the PS03. Therefore, Verstappen tested the 2001 PS01 on Avon F3000 tyres. It would not be until late February 2003 an agreement with Bridgestone was reached. Late in February, Minardi held a test session at Imola Circuit where the second Cosworth powered PS03 chassis was tested for the first time, with Bridgestone tyres. Just 24 hours before the car would be packed for transit to Australia for the first round. As power-assisted rack and pinion steering system became mandatory in the sport from 2003 season onwards, Minardi PS03 was the last-ever Formula One car to adopt the power-assisted rack and pinion steering system due to previous Minardi car utilized the manual rack and pinion steering.

The PS03 was launched formally in Melbourne, Australia ahead of the first race.

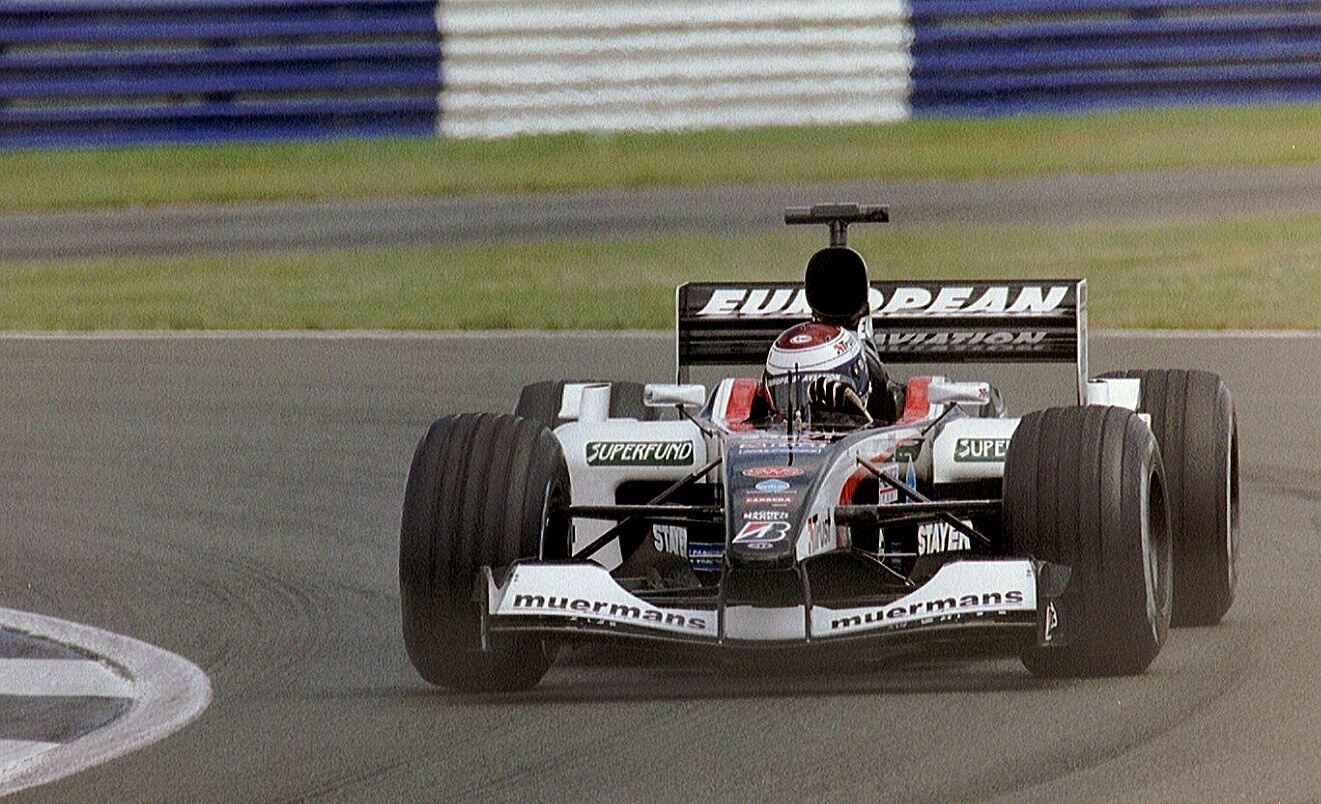
Jos Verstappen driving the PS03 at Silverstone

The 2003 season was largely challenging for Minardi. The PS03 secured no points all season and retired from 11 races, including Justin Wilson retiring from the first four races. He suffered from exhaustion and temporary paralysis in the neck during the 2003 Malaysian Grand Prix due to his HANS device coming loose and restricting arm movement inside the PS03 cockpit. Verstappen had a chance of scoring points at the rain soaked 2003 Brazilian Grand Prix, where a host of drivers including world champion Michael Schumacher retired, but retired on lap 31 due to a spin.

In June 2003, owner Stoddart had purchased five Arrows A23 race cars following the teams administration. There was speculation that the cars were of higher quality than the PS03 and they may run in the Minardi colours for 2004. In August of that year, Jos Verstappen tested the A23 at Mugello Circuit to assess its suitability.

In July, Wilson was signed by Jaguar Racing and replaced outgoing driver Antonio Pizzonia. Minardi quickly signed Nicolas Kiesa, who did not score any points but finished all five Grand Prix he competed in driving the PS03.

Minardi would ultimately finish in last place in the Constructors' Championship with no points.

== Financial difficulties and sponsorship ==
Minardi started the year with a primarily black car, featuring heavy sponsorship from owner Paul Stoddart's European Aviation brand. Alongside this were new deals with Gazprom and Superfund. Gazprom defaulted on their payments and were removed from the car before the 2003 Austrian Grand Prix. At this time, Dutch business Trust upped their sponsorship and the car gained a black & white split livery.

The Malaysian flag was displayed on the side of the cars Malaysian Grand Prix with the message "Malaysia for Peace".

Through the season, the team gained sponsorship from tools brand Stayer. However, after the brand failed to provide funds to the team, the Japanese Grand Prix saw the Stayer logo covered with red text saying "Not paid". The cars ran the race with that modification.

At the beginning of the season, there were on-going discussions between team bosses and the FIA about the distribution of revenue. Ron Dennis and Frank Williams were particularly against supporting Minardi, and this was heavily criticised by then FIA president Max Mosley.

Part way through the season, Bernie Ecclestone bought a minority shareholding in the team. By October, Italian newspaper La Gazzetta dello Sport claimed Minardi had been sold for 2004, this was later refuted by owner Stoddart.

== Complete Formula One results ==
(key)

Year	Entrant	Engine	Tyres	Drivers	1	2	3	4	5	6	7	8	9	10	11	12	13	14	15	16	Points	WCC
2003	European Minardi Cosworth	Cosworth V10	B		AUS	MAL	BRA	SMR	ESP	AUT	MON	CAN	EUR	FRA	GBR	GER	HUN	ITA	USA	JPN	0	10th
2003	European Minardi Cosworth	Cosworth V10	B	(United Kingdom) Justin Wilson	Ret	Ret	Ret	Ret	11	13	Ret	Ret	13	14	16						0	10th
2003	European Minardi Cosworth	Cosworth V10	B	(Denmark) Nicolas Kiesa												12	13	12	11	16	0	10th
2003	European Minardi Cosworth	Cosworth V10	B	(Netherlands) Jos Verstappen	11	13	Ret	Ret	12	Ret	Ret	9	14	16	15	Ret	12	Ret	10	15	0	10th
