= Minardi PS02 =

Formula One racing car

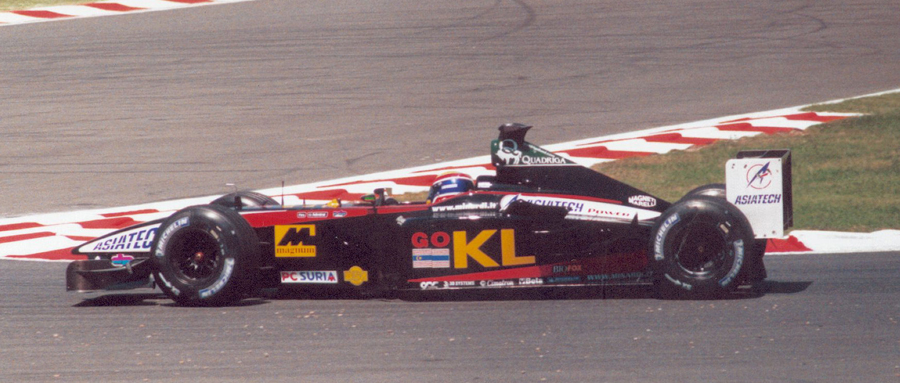
- Mark Webber driving the PS02 during the 2002 French Grand Prix
- Category: Formula One
- Constructor: Minardi
- Designers: Gabriele Tredozi (Technical Director); Andrew Tilley (Deputy Technical Director); George Ryton (Chief Designer); Loïc Bigois (Chief Aerodynamicist)
- Predecessor: PS01
- Successor: PS03

Technical specifications
- Chassis: Carbon-fibre monocoque
- Engine: Asiatech AT02 3.0-litre V10 (72°) naturally-aspirated mid-engined
- Transmission: Minardi 6-speed longitudinal semi-automatic sequential
- Power: 800 hp @ 16,200 rpm
- Fuel: Elf
- Tyres: Michelin

Competition history
- Notable entrants: KL Minardi Asiatech
- Notable drivers: 22. (Malaysia) Alex Yoong; 22. (United Kingdom) Anthony Davidson; 23. (Australia) Mark Webber
- Debut: 2002 Australian Grand Prix
- Last event: 2002 Japanese Grand Prix
| Races | Wins | Poles | F/Laps |
|---|---|---|---|
| 17 | 0 | 0 | 0 |
- Constructors' Championships: 0
- Drivers' Championships: 0

The Minardi PS02 was the car with which the Minardi team competed in the 2002 Formula One World Championship.

== Overview ==
The PS02 was designed by technical director Gabriele Tredozi and chief aerodynamicist Loic Bigois, who had joined the team from the now defunct Prost team. The car was recognised as a significant step forward from the PS01, and the team utilised extensive wind tunnel testing in Italy and the United Kingdom. The car utilised the Minardi's unique titanium cased gearbox, and changed to a pushrod from pullrod suspension for the first time. The PS02 featured the new Asiatech AT02 V10 engine which would be dropped for the 2003 season in favour of Cosworth. The sidepod area design of the PS02 was quite similar to that of the Arrows A23.

The PS02 was launched in Kuala Lumpur, Malaysia in February 2002. Owing to support from the state tourism authority and lottery, Magnum. The shakedown took place at Imola Circuit, with Alex Yoong at the wheel.

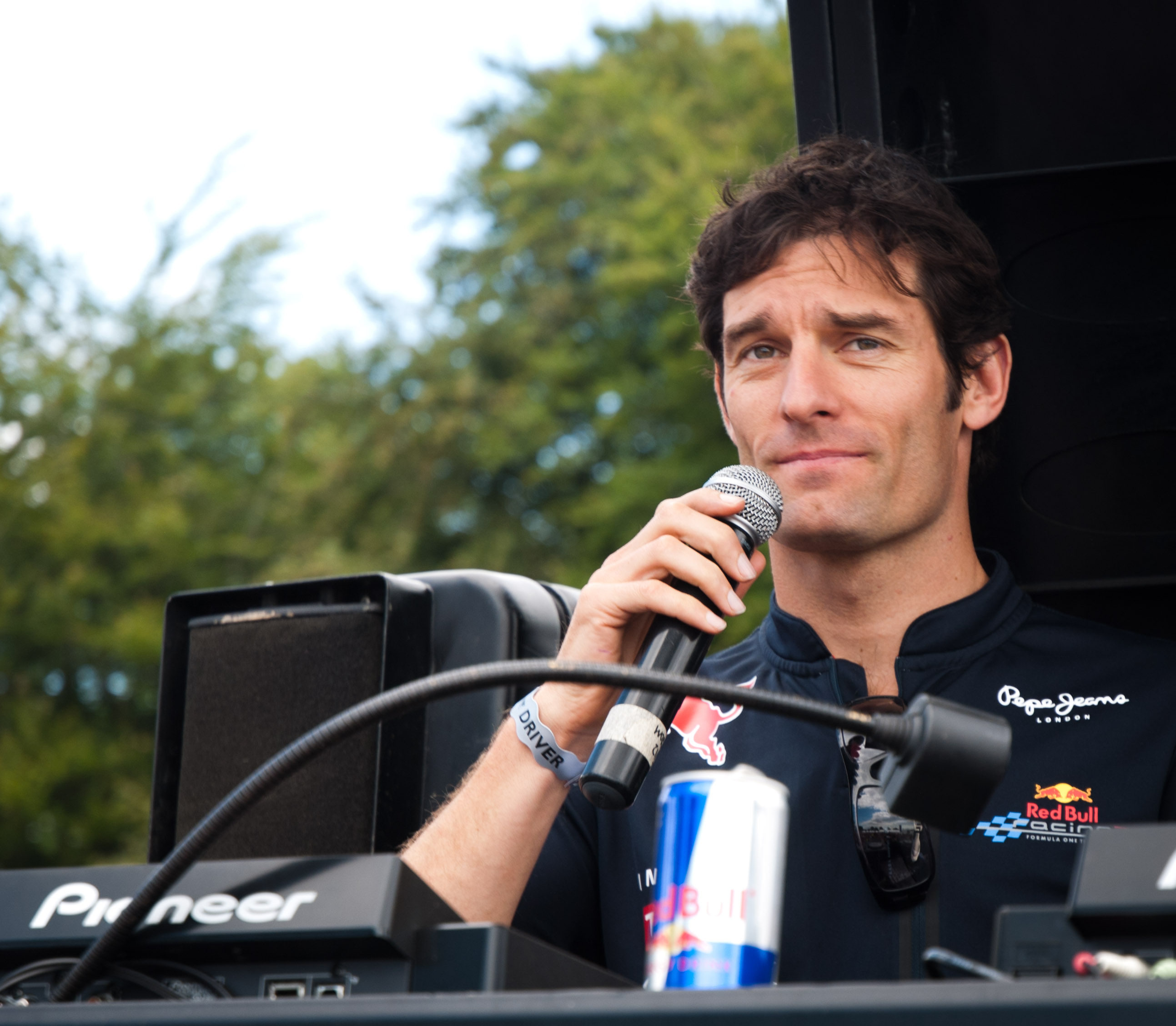
Webber (pictured in 2011) scored Minardi's first points since 1999 in the PS02

The season started in spectacular fashion for the team. New driver and Australian favourite Mark Webber scored two points finishing fifth at the season-opening race in Melbourne, ahead of the significantly better-funded Toyota team. This was Minardi's first points scoring car since 1999, when Marc Gené scored one point at the European Grand Prix.

However, Australia was a highlight of an otherwise poor season for Minardi. The PS02 suffered from a total of 14 race retirements, of which 4 were related to the Asiatech V10. Additionally, rookie Yoong failed to qualify the car on three occasions, falling foul of the 107% rule. This caused Minardi to replace him for two races with British American Racing test driver, Anthony Davidson. Ultimately, Davidson, would retire from both races.

In Spain, neither car started the Grand Prix. A manufacturing error in the front wing caused Webber's to fail during qualifying, meanwhile team mate Yoong had an incident that caused a red flag. Whilst repairs were made overnight, including flying the wing between Catalunya and Faenza, owner Paul Stoddart withdrew both cars from Sunday's Grand Prix.

Minardi struggled for finance throughout the season. Before the season even began, owner Stoddart legally challenged the French court over a decision to sell Prost Grand Prix to fellow team owner Tom Walkinshaw, in order to protect his team's television rights money. In August, British newspaper The Daily Telegraph reported that Stoddart was due to sell the team to a consortium led by Irish businessman Brendan McGuinness and Saudi Prince Al-Waleed bin Talal. However this did not materialise. By the season close, Stoddart's business European Aviation who also sponsored the team in 2002, was on the verge of sale although it was not to fund the team. Financial difficulties from 2002, followed the team into 2003 where Stoddart was suing three sponsors for non-payment and Yoong chased $200,000 in unpaid wages.

Minardi finished the season 9th in the Constructors' Championship, equal on points with newly-richest Toyota works team and now defunct Arrows Grand Prix.

== Sponsorship and livery ==
The PS02 kept the black colour scheme of its predecessor, with minor portions of red. The car featured sponsorship from the Malaysian government, displaying Go KL logos on the sidepods and engine covers. European Aviation and Magnum also remained as major sponsors.

From the European Grand Prix onwards, the sponsor Quadriga appeared on the car's air intake and sidepods. From the Hungarian Grand Prix onwards, Gazprom appeared as a sponsor on the car's engine cover.

== Complete Formula One results ==
(key)

| Year | Entrant | Engine | Tyres | Drivers | 1 | 2 | 3 | 4 | 5 | 6 | 7 | 8 | 9 | 10 | 11 | 12 | 13 | 14 | 15 | 16 | 17 | Points | WCC |
|---|---|---|---|---|---|---|---|---|---|---|---|---|---|---|---|---|---|---|---|---|---|---|---|
| 2002 | KL Minardi Asiatech | Asiatech AT02 V10 | M | | AUS | MAL | BRA | SMR | ESP | AUT | MON | CAN | EUR | GBR | FRA | GER | HUN | BEL | ITA | USA | JPN | 2 | 9th |
| 2002 | KL Minardi Asiatech | Asiatech AT02 V10 | M | (Malaysia) Alex Yoong | 7 | Ret | 13 | DNQ | DNS | Ret | Ret | 14 | Ret | DNQ | 10 | DNQ | | | 13 | Ret | Ret | 2 | 9th |
| 2002 | KL Minardi Asiatech | Asiatech AT02 V10 | M | (United Kingdom) Anthony Davidson | | | | | | | | | | | | | Ret | Ret | | | | 2 | 9th |
| 2002 | KL Minardi Asiatech | Asiatech AT02 V10 | M | (Australia) Mark Webber | 5 | Ret | 11 | 11 | DNS | 12 | 11 | 11 | 15 | Ret | 8 | Ret | 16 | Ret | Ret | Ret | 10 | 2 | 9th |
