= Asiatech =

Asiatech may refer to:

- Asiatech Data Transmission, an Iranian content delivery network, mobile virtual network operator, VPS, website hosting services and broadband provider
- Asia Motor Technologies France, a Formula One engine manufacturer which competed under the name "Asiatech"
