= 2002 Spanish Grand Prix =

Fifth round of the 2002 Formula One season

Coordinates: 41°34′12″N 2°15′40″E

Race 5 of 17 in the 2002 Formula One World Championship
← Previous race	Next race →

Race details
- Date: 28 April 2002
- Official name: Gran Premio Marlboro de España 2002
- Location: Circuit de Catalunya, Montmeló, Catalonia, Spain
- Course: Permanent racing facility
- Course length: 4.730 km (2.939 miles)
- Distance: 65 laps, 307.327 km (190.964 miles)
- Weather: Clear, Air Temp: 20°C
- Attendance: 100,000

Pole position
Driver	(Germany) Michael Schumacher	Ferrari
- Time: 1:16.364

Fastest lap
Driver	(Germany) Michael Schumacher	Ferrari
- Time: 1:20.355 on lap 49

Podium
First	(Germany) Michael Schumacher	Ferrari
Second	(Colombia) Juan Pablo Montoya	Williams-BMW
Third	(United Kingdom) David Coulthard	McLaren-Mercedes

The 2002 Spanish Grand Prix (formally the Gran Premio Marlboro de España 2002) was a Formula One motor race held on 28 April 2002 at the Circuit de Catalunya, Montmeló, Catalonia, Spain. It was the fifth round of the 2002 Formula One World Championship and was held before 100,000 spectators. Ferrari's Michael Schumacher won the 65-lap race from pole position. Williams's Juan Pablo Montoya finished in second and McLaren's David Coulthard was third.

Heading into the race, Michael Schumacher led the World Drivers' Championship and his team Ferrari led the World Constructors Championship. He started on pole position after setting the quickest lap time in the one-hour qualifying session, and he led every lap of the race to win his fourth race of the season and 57th of his career. Montoya finished second 35.630 seconds behind, despite a botched second scheduled pit stop, and Coulthard finished third, another 6.993 seconds back, his second podium of the season.

Michael Schumacher achieved a Grand Slam (started from pole position, set the fastest lap, led every lap and won the race) and his lead in the World Drivers' Championship increased to 21 championship points following the race. Montoya's second-place finish moved him past his teammate Ralf Schumacher, who retired from the Grand Prix. Ferrari extended their World Constructors' Championship lead over Williams to seven championship points with twelve races remaining in the season.

== Background ==
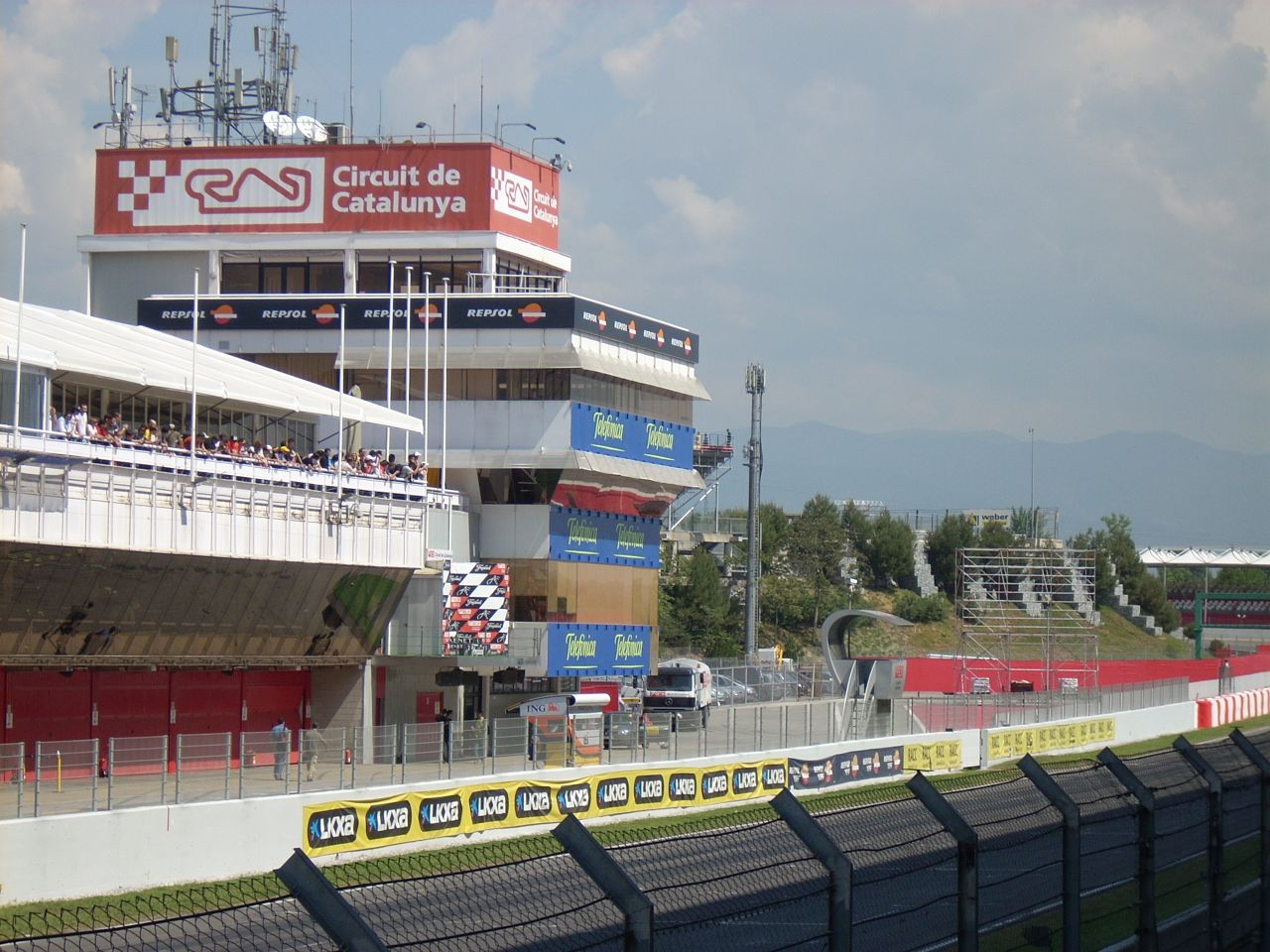
The Circuit de Catalunya (pictured in 2007), where the Grand Prix was held

The 2002 Spanish Grand Prix was the fifth round of seventeen in the 2002 Formula One World Championship and took place on 28 April 2002 at the Circuit de Catalunya in Montmeló, Catalonia, Spain, close to Barcelona. Heading into the race, Ferrari driver Michael Schumacher led the World Drivers' Championship with 34 championship points, followed by the Williams pair of Ralf Schumacher (20) and Juan Pablo Montoya (17). Renault's Jenson Button was fourth with 8 championship points and Ferrari's Rubens Barrichello was fifth on 6. Ferrari led the World Constructors' Championship with 40 championship points, three ahead of Williams in second. McLaren were third with nine championship points, followed by Renault on nine and Jaguar with three.

Following the San Marino Grand Prix on 14 April, the teams tested their racing setups, aerodynamics, car components, tyres and electronics at European circuits in preparation for the Spanish Grand Prix. The Arrows, British American Racing (BAR), Jaguar, Jordan, Minardi, Renault, Sauber and Williams teams spent three days testing at Northamptonshire's Silverstone Circuit. McLaren and Toyota spent three days at Italy's Mugello Circuit, while Ferrari spent four days at the same track. Ferrari also tested for three days at Italy's Monza Circuit, and also spent a day at their private test facility, the Fiorano Circuit.

Michael Schumacher, the pre-race favourite, had won three of the past four races in the 2002 season and had won the Spanish Grand Prix three times in 10 entries. He stated that Ferrari would be focused on the race in Spain and would take a race-by-race approach, despite him scoring eight more championship points than at this point last season. Michael Schumacher added Ferrari were confident the potential of the F2002 would be demonstrated more in Spain. Despite being 17 championship points behind Michael Schumacher, Montoya maintained a positive attitude, "We still have a chance at fighting back. It is a matter of who can evolve the car quicker. I don't know if I can beat Michael here but you never know." Coulthard finished sixth in the San Marino Grand Prix, but he was looking forward to racing in Spain after three days of testing at Mugello.

There were eleven teams (each representing a different constructor) with two drivers each for the Grand Prix, with no changes from the season entry list. Ferrari updated their F2002 cars with new torsion bars, modified the screens behind the front wheels, and introduced new front and rear wings. McLaren improved the MP4-17's rear suspension layout while Williams received a more powerful BMW engine and a new rear wing. Cosworth and Honda both introduced new improved versions of their engines; Jaguar used the more powerful Cosworth engine in the race, while Arrows used the old engine specification. Mercedes introduced a new, more reliable engine specification for the McLarens, increasing power and driveability.

== Practice ==
Two one-hour practice sessions on Friday and two 45-minute sessions on Saturday preceded the race. The first practice session on Friday morning was held in sunny and humid weather. The Ferraris led practice due to the track's fast, long bends, while McLaren and Williams were behind due to car balance concerns. Michael Schumacher was fastest with a lap time of 1:20.681, 0.061 seconds faster than teammate Barrichello. Sauber's Felipe Massa, McLaren's Kimi Räikkönen, Renault's Jarno Trulli, Arrows's Heinz-Harald Frentzen, Coulthard, Massa's teammate Nick Heidfeld, Jordan's Giancarlo Fisichella and Arrows's Enrique Bernoldi completed the top ten. Some drivers lost control of their cars and went off the circuit during the session. Jordan's Takuma Sato was the only driver who did not set a lap because he stopped his car after the pit lane exit shortly after the session began due to an electrical connection failure to an engine sensor. He was not allowed to continue with the session since the usage of spare cars was prohibited before qualifying.

In the second practice session, which took place later in the afternoon and sunny conditions, Michael Schumacher set the day's fastest lap time of 1:20.380. Frentzen was second-fastest, 0.070 seconds slower. Button, Barrichello, BAR's Olivier Panis, Bernoldi, Räikkönen, Fisichella, Massa and Trulli rounded out the top ten. At the first chicane, Michael Schumacher raced wide towards the gravel trap's edge, but he returned to the race circuit and continued. Trulli lost control of his Renault, forcing him to apply opposite lock in the track's second sector. He ran into the gravel trap, but avoided colliding with the barrier and returned to the circuit to continue.

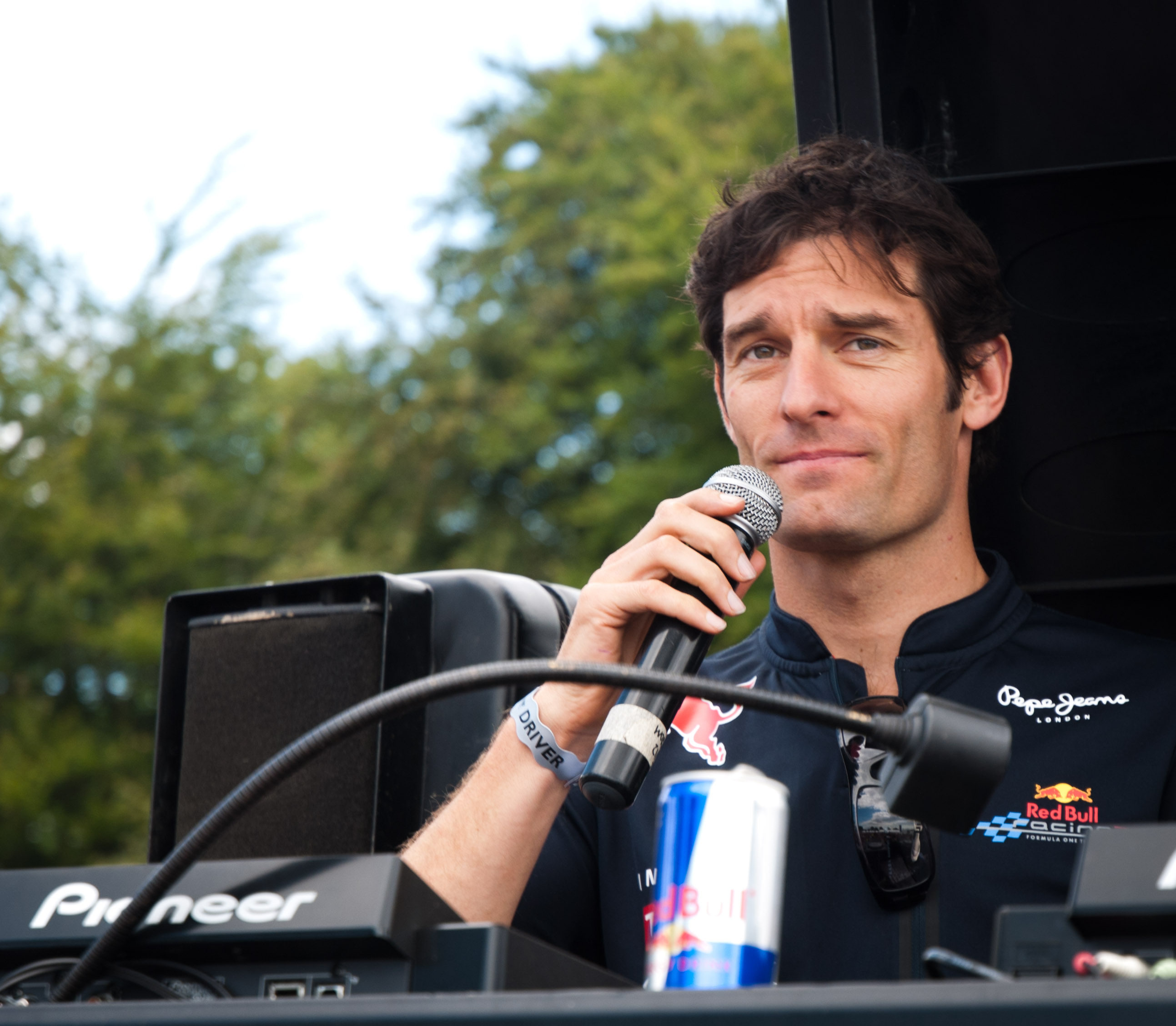
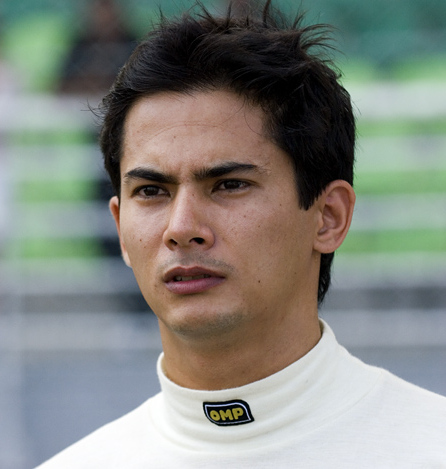
Mark Webber (left) and his teammate Alex Yoong (right) suffered three wing failures on their cars during free practice, qualifying and warm-up that led to Minardi's withdrawal from the Grand Prix.

Conditions were cool and overcast for the third practice session on Saturday morning. Two-thirds through practice, Barrichello set the quickest lap of 1:18.048. His teammate Michael Schumacher was 0.386 seconds behind in second. Coulthard, Ralf Schumacher, the Sauber pair of Heidfeld and Massa, Räikkönen, Button, Montoya and Montoya were in positions three through ten. 17 minutes in, Minardi's Mark Webber struck a small bump on the start/finish straight, and as the PS02 car rose into the air, the front wing from the drop plates mounting the rear wing to the nose cone detached at the upper ends. The wing folded under Webber's car and shattered, leaving carbon fibre debris on the start/finish straight. Webber maintained control of his car and returned to the pit lane. The session was immediately halted for eight minutes to allow marshals to clear the track of debris from Webber's car. Minardi used a different front wing design for the final practice session later in the morning.

It became slightly warmer for the final session. Although no other driver better Barrichello's third session effort, he led despite not lapping faster. Heidfeld went second-quickest with 15 minutes left. In positions three to ten were Michael Schumacher, Coulthard, Button, Frentzen, Räikkönen, Massa, Panis and Bernoldi. Sato spun backwards 360 degrees through the gravel trap midway through Renault corner. He touched the tyre barrier head-on, dislodging the nose cone. Montoya lost control of his car under braking for La Caixa corner but continued.

== Qualifying ==
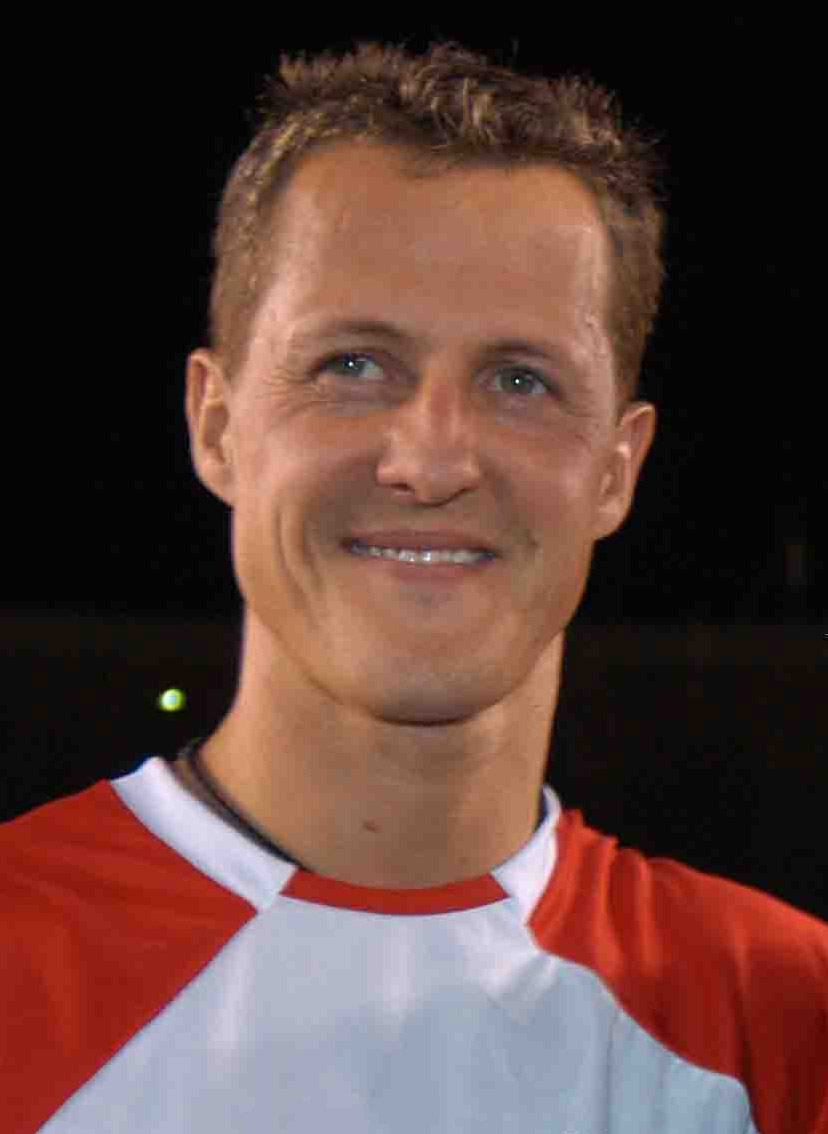
Michael Schumacher (pictured in 2005) took pole position by setting the fastest lap in the one-hour qualifying session and led every lap of the race to secure his fourth victory of the season.

Each driver was allowed twelve laps during Saturday's one-hour qualifying session, with starting positions determined by the drivers' quickest laps. During this session, the 107% rule was in effect, requiring each driver to remain within 107% of the quickest lap time in order to qualify for the race. Qualifying took place in dry and cloudy conditions with low humidity. After modifying his Ferrari in the garage after his opening two runs, Michael Schumacher took his third pole position of five races in the season and 46th of his career, setting a new track lap record of 1:16.364 shortly before qualifying ended, lapping almost two seconds faster than his pole lap from 2001. Barrichello led after his first two runs, holding pole until his teammate's final lap, starting second. He made an error at turn 13 on his first two runs and may have run wide at turn 12 on his fastest lap, despite improved wind conditions. Williams took the second row following overnight work and testing of changes in the morning free practice sessions. Ralf Schumacher led early on before falling to third after Williams modified his car. Montoya noticed an engine ignition misfire in his race car after leaving the garage, so Williams decided to switch him to the spare car. His fastest time on his last run in the final minute placed him fourth. Montoya's lap demoted Räikkönen to fifth, who qualified ahead of his teammate Coulthard for the second consecutive Grand Prix. Räikkönen ran sideways after hitting the inside kerbing at Campsa corner, but he regained control of his McLaren on the grass and resumed driving. Button had a minor oversteer in the high-speed turns and secured sixth in the final minute. Coulthard, seventh, aborted his third run owing to excess understeer in turn three and was set for a top-six finish until the last minute. Heidfeld's Ferrari qualifying engine and a setup change to boost his car's performance in high-speed turns were enough for eighth.

Trulli was only ahead of the Minardi cars for most of qualifying, driving the spare Renault to ninth. He made a mistake on his second run and returned to the pit lane before abandoning his next run due to a stoppage. Frentzen put his faster Arrows car into tenth. Despite being in the top ten for most of qualifying, Massa was 11th due to late improvements by other drivers. He made an error at turn four on his third run and again on his final run. Fisichella was the fastest Honda-powered driver in 12th. Panis, 13th, lost two of his four runs due to on-track issues, and the halt and loss of track time prevented him from identifying a more suitable setup. Bernoldi had some understeer but secured 14th, his best qualifying effort to date. Jaguar's Eddie Irvine overcame his car's major aerodynamic deficiencies and provisionally qualified 15th. BAR's Jacques Villeneuve, 16th, lacked grip. Pedro de la Rosa, Irvine's teammate, finished 17th thanks to a better racing setup, more grip in the tyres, and warmer asphalt temperatures. Toyota's Mika Salo and Allan McNish qualified 18th and 20th. McNish lost control of his Toyota's rear exiting the final corner after hititng a bump; he avoided hitting the inside concrete barrier at the pit lane entry and continued. Sato in 19th failed to match his teammate's pace because he drove a nervous car and had traffic on his second run in the second sector. The Minardi pair of Webber and Alex Yoong qualified 21st and 22nd. Yoong ran wide through the final corner and his front wing detached from the car on the kerbs, lifting it into the air. The wing was on the racing line, so qualifying was stopped for four minutes to clear debris from Yoong's car, which returned to the pit lane.

=== Post-qualifying ===
After qualifying, the stewards deleted all of Irvine's qualifying lap times after the Fédération Internationale de l'Automobile's (FIA; motor sport's governing body) technical delegate discovered a discrepancy between the fuel in his car on Saturday and that of a control sample approved two weeks before the event. The FIA regulations mandated that he begin from the back of the starting grid.

=== Qualifying classification ===
Pos	No	Driver	Constructor	Lap	Gap	Grid
1	1	(Germany) Michael Schumacher	Ferrari	1:16.364	—	1
2	2	(Brazil) Rubens Barrichello	Ferrari	1:16.690	+0.326	2
3	5	(Germany) Ralf Schumacher	Williams-BMW	1:17.277	+0.913	3
4	6	(Colombia) Juan Pablo Montoya	Williams-BMW	1:17.425	+1.061	4
5	4	(Finland) Kimi Räikkönen	McLaren-Mercedes	1:17.519	+1.155	5
6	15	(United Kingdom) Jenson Button	Renault	1:17.638	+1.274	6
7	3	(United Kingdom) David Coulthard	McLaren-Mercedes	1:17.662	+1.298	7
8	7	(Germany) Nick Heidfeld	Sauber-Petronas	1:17.851	+1.487	8
9	14	(Italy) Jarno Trulli	Renault	1:17.929	+1.565	9
10	20	(Germany) Heinz-Harald Frentzen	Arrows-Cosworth	1:18.121	+1.757	10
11	8	(Brazil) Felipe Massa	Sauber-Petronas	1:18.139	+1.775	11
12	9	(Italy) Giancarlo Fisichella	Jordan-Honda	1:18.291	+1.927	12
13	12	(France) Olivier Panis	BAR-Honda	1:18.472	+2.108	13
14	21	(Brazil) Enrique Bernoldi	Arrows-Cosworth	1:18.515	+2.151	14
EX^{1}	16	(United Kingdom) Eddie Irvine	Jaguar-Cosworth	1:18.779	+2.415	22
15	11	(Canada) Jacques Villeneuve	BAR-Honda	1:18.847	+2.483	15
16	17	(Spain) Pedro de la Rosa	Jaguar-Cosworth	1:18.885	+2.521	16
17	24	(Finland) Mika Salo	Toyota	1:18.897	+2.533	17
18	10	(Japan) Takuma Sato	Jordan-Honda	1:19.002	+2.638	18
19	25	(United Kingdom) Allan McNish	Toyota	1:19.025	+2.661	19
20	23	(Australia) Mark Webber	Minardi-Asiatech	1:19.802	+3.438	20
21	22	(Malaysia) Alex Yoong	Minardi-Asiatech	1:21.415	+5.051	21
107% time: 1:21.709

Notes

- ^1 – Eddie Irvine was dropped to the rear of the grid after a fuel analysis revealed that the fuel was not the same as that approved for use two weeks before the Grand Prix.

== Warm-up ==
On race morning, a half-hour warm-up session was held in cool and cloudy weather conditions. Barrichello led with a 1:20.229 lap set shortly before warm-up ended. Heidfeld, Michael Schumacher, Massa, Frentzen, Ralf Schumacher, Bernoldi, Panis, Sato and Button occupied positions second through tenth. Michael Schumacher stopped his Ferrari at the side of the track at Banc Sabadell corner with an hydraulics failure. With more than a minute remaining, Webber's rear wing detached from his car on the start/finish straight due to a component failure. He braked for turn one and spun into the gravel trap close to the barrier at high speed due to the lack of downforce. Webber was unhurt and warm-up restarted after nearly five minutes.

After warm-up, because of the three wing failures on both of the Minardi cars that were returned to the team's headquarters in Faenza, Italy for analysis and modification, team owner Paul Stoddart withdrew the team from the Grand Prix on safety grounds because of the lack of time and facilities to analyse the remaining wings for manufacturing defects.

== Race ==
The 65-lap race began before 100,000 spectators at 14:00 local time. It took place in bright, dry and overcast conditions ranging from 18 and 21 °C (64 and 70 °F) and the track temperature was between 21 and 22 °C (70 and 72 °F). Following the Minardi team's withdrawal, 20 cars were scheduled to start, but Barrichello's Ferrari was stationary on the grid at the start of the formation lap due to a gearbox selection fault. Although the engine was running, marshals pushed the Ferrari into the pit lane, but Ferrari were unable to rectify the problem and Barrichello failed to start the event since switching to a spare car was prohibited during the race.

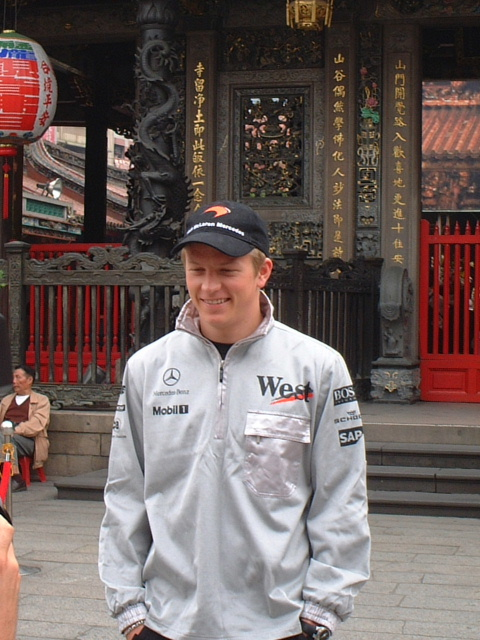
Kimi Räikkönen retired from the Grand Prix when his rear wing failed due to fatigue-related lower wing element failure on lap four.

When the race began, Michael Schumacher, in the spare Ferrari due to hydraulic troubles in warm-up, maintained the race lead into the first corner, holding off Ralf Schumacher on the inside. Button made a quick start, passing Räikkönen for fourth, but the latter recaptured the position on the outside at the first corner. His teammate Trulli moved from ninth to seventh by the conclusion of lap one, while Massa overtook Frentzen for ninth. At the conclusion of the first lap, Michael Schumacher led Ralf Schumacher by 1.5 seconds. They were followed by Montoya, Räikkönen, Button and Coulthard. On lap three, De la Rosa lost control of the Jaguar's rear during braking and retired from the race after becoming stuck in the turn seven gravel trap. Raikkonen's rear wing failed from the McLaren's rear bodywork on the pit lane straight on lap four due to a fatigue-related lower wing element failure acting as a mount for the wing. He maintained control of his car but his rear wing narrowly avoided Button, who served to avoid being decapitated. Raikkonen returned to the pit lane and retired from the race. McLaren chose not to withdraw Coulthard after reviewing its database and determining that his wing assembly was new and not at risk.

Fisichella retired in the garage on lap six due to him losing hydraulic pressure. Frentzen and Panis battled for ninth place but Panis was unable to pass Frentzen. By lap 12, Michael Schumacher had increased his advantage over Ralf Schumacher to 10.4 seconds. Sato ran widethrough turn 12 and held the subsequent slide long enough to reach New Holland corner, but was unable to avoid the gravel trap and retired from the Grand Prix. The race became processional as Michael Schumacher set a series of fastest laps to pull away more from Ralf Schumacher and was more than 20 seconds ahead by the 23rd lap. The first round of pit stops began on lap 24. Trulli made his first pit stop from sixth and rejoined the track in 11th. Ralf Schumacher in second and Button in fourth made their first pit stops on the next lap. Ralf Schumacher fell to seventh while Button dropped to eighth. On lap 26, Montoya made his first pit stop from second and rejoined the circuit in seventh after a minor delay installing the front-right wheel.

Michael Schumacher made his first pit stop at the end of the lap. Despite a slight fuel nozzle issue, he rejoined in first place with an 11-second lead over Montoya after a 9.4-second pit stop. On lap 29, Ralf Schumacher ran wide onto the grass at Campsa corner, causing damage to his car's front wing and removing the left-hand side bargeboard. This required him to make an unscheduled pit stop for a replacement front wing and a new front-left tyre. Ralf Schumacher was stationary for 28.3 seconds, falling from third to 13th. He dropped out of contention for a points-paying result. This promoted Montoya to second and Button to third. Meanwhile, Coulthard took his first pit stop from second on that lap, rejoining the track in fourth, behind Button. Coulthard's later pit stop allowed him to set a sequence of quick lap times, closing in on Button, who was slowing due to handling issues. On lap 34, Coulthard slipstreamed Button on the start/finish straight, passing him on the inside into turn one for third after braking later than Button and a small wheel touch.

Trulli soon caught up to Button, who was told to allow his teammate pass into fourth place on lap 36 due to a hydraulic issue that caused his Renault to stick in gear and then shut down in left-hand curves. Two laps later, Villeneuve passed Bernoldi on the inside into turn one for tenth. Bernoldi retired at the conclusion of lap 41 with an hydraulics leak. On that lap, Ralf Schumacher made a third pit stop for a new front wing to replace the old one that had failed to generate car handling for him, in an attempt to regain aerodynamic efficiency and performance. Irvine went slowly into the pit lane on lap 43 due to a hydraulics system failure, then moved out of the way for Button in fifth and Heidfeld in sixth. Heidfeld's pit stop was eight-tenths of a second faster than Button. After running alongside each other in the pit lane, Heidfeld passed Button at the pit lane exit for fifth after Button ceded the place. Panis pulled over on the grass at the pit lane exit due to an exhaust failure, forcing him to retire on lap 45.

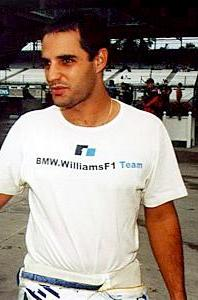
Juan Pablo Montoya finished in second position despite a botched pit stop on lap 46 in which the Williams chief mechanic mistakenly signalled him to leave his pit box even though the stop had not been completed.

Montoya made his second scheduled pit stop on lap 46. His pit stop became difficult since chief mechanic and lollipop holder Carl Gaden signalled Montoya to exit on the front-left side before removing the fuel nozzle from the car's rear. Gaden dropped the lollipop on the front of Montoya's car to stop him. Montoya disengaged the hand clutch before stalling, running over Gaden's left foot with his front-left wheel. Montoya stopped before the fuel pipe was removed from the filler and was moved back slightly before being allowed to drive away. Gaden, the refueller, and a right-front tyre changer were knocked sideways to the ground, and a mechanic took the wheel off Gaden's foot. Nevertheless, Montoya retained second because of his substantial lead over Coulthard in third. Coulthard made his second pit stop on lap 47, and Michael Schumacher followed from the lead on the same lap, following advice from Ferrari technical director Ross Brawn to avoid being baulked by slower cars ahead of him for the rest of the race. Both drivers retained third and first, respectively; Michael Schumacher was 41.8 seconds ahead of Montoya.

Two laps later, Massa passed Button on the inside at Elf corner but Button retook sixth at Seat corner. Both drivers continued to battle, allowing Frentzen to close up. Button's faster speed on the straights allowed him to keep Massa behind him. On lap 57, Button ran wide in turns seven and eight, allowing Massa to pass him for sixth, followed by Frentzen for seventh. Five laps later, Trulli abruptly slowed due to a deteriorating engine problem beyond his control. This allowed Heidfeld to move up to fourth, Massa to fifth, and Frentzen to sixth. Button retired at the side of the track on lap 63, while Trulli did the same on the final lap in the pit lane. Ralf Schumacher pulled over to the side of the track on the final lap, with smoke spewing from his car's rear.

Michael Schumacher slowed in the final laps, but he maintained the lead he had held since starting the race from pole position, securing his fourth victory of the season and 57th of his career. He achieved a Grand Slam (start from pole position, set the fastest lap, lead every lap and win the race). Montoya finished second, 35.630 seconds behind Michael Schumacher, and Coulthard took third place for his second podium finish of the season. Sauber was the only team to have both drivers gain championship points, with Heidfeld finishing fourth and Massa fifth. Frentzen completed the points-paying positions in sixth, registering his and Arrows's first championship point of 2002 and finishing 1.4 seconds behind Massa. Villeneuve was dissatisfied with the feel of his car but finished seventh, approximately seven seconds behind Frentzen. McNish and Salo's Toyotas finished eighth and ninth, with the latter stopping on the final lap due to a technical issue. Trulli, Ralf Schumacher and Button were the final classified finishers despite retiring from the Grand Prix.

=== Post-race ===
The top three drivers appeared on the podium to collect their trophies and spoke to the media in the subsequent press conference. Michael Schumacher, who received the winners' trophy from Juan Carlos I, praised the Bridgestone tyres for being consistent during the race and said it was the correct circuit for the Ferrari, adding, "The guys in our team have done a tremendous job over the winter and again, this circuit shows what our engineers have done." Montoya said Williams battled with pace during the race weekend because the Ferrari was too fast for him, but he was pleased to finish second, "It was clearly a difficult race for us. I think we made the best of what we had." Coulthard said he was pleased to benefit from other cars' reliability issues, saying, "I benefited from other people's misfortune, but you accept that because that's motor racing."

Gaden was not seriously injured. He told The Times, "I'm mad with myself. I wanted to stop the car but instinctively put my foot out and you don't stop a racing car with your foot." Williams technical director Patrick Head commented, "He's a hard man, he'll survive. I think his pride is more damaged than his body." Montoya apologised for running over Gaden's foot. He stated the accident would have been worse had he not stopped his car fast enough. Ralf Schumacher expressed his displeasure over making an error that damaged his car and dropped him out of contention for a strong result. Barrichello said "I don't think it's bad luck...it's something that could happen to me or to Michael. It happened to me" after retiring for the fourth time in five races while his teammate Michael Schumacher expressed sympathy for Barrichello, "Everything that has gone wrong this year so far has gone wrong for him. You can't really think it will always go that way. You know that one day it's going to hit you." Head commented Michael Schumacher had "lady luck on his side" and added Barrichello was "like a magnet for bad luck."

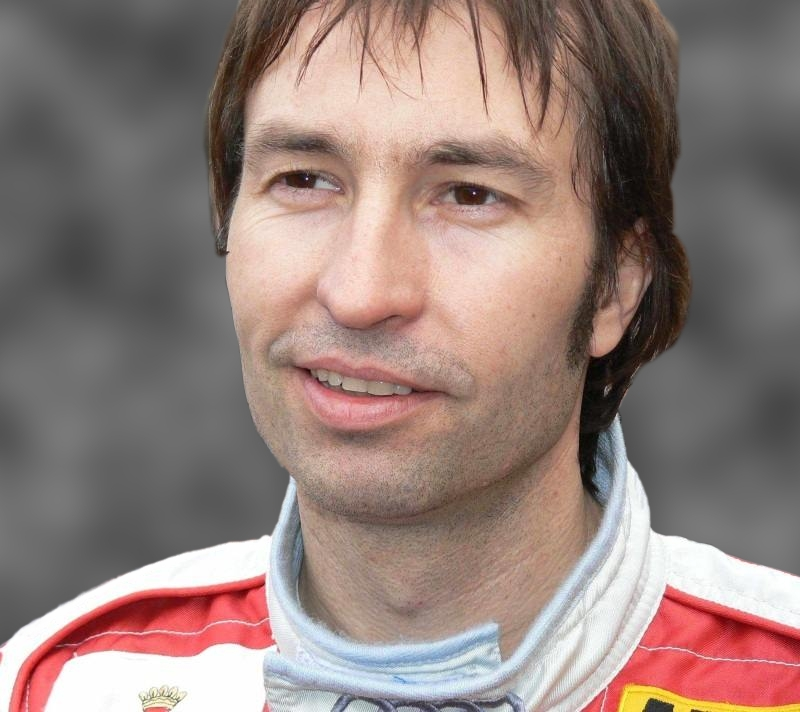
Heinz-Harald Frentzen (pictured in 2006) finished sixth to score his first championship points since the 2001 San Marino Grand Prix.

Heidfeld stated that it had been "a really good weekend" and that his fourth-place finish was indicative of Sauber's car improvements. Massa, his teammate, hailed it "a fabulous race" for himself after finishing fifth and earning his second championship point in five Grands Prix. Frentzen earned his first championship point since the 2001 San Marino Grand Prix and Arrows's first since Jos Verstappen finished sixth in the 2001 Austrian Grand Prix. He was ecstatic, saying, "That was great! The team has done a superb job all weekend so they thoroughly deserve this point." Arrows team principal Tom Walkinshaw noted that the outcome highlighted why it invested in Frentzen. Räikkönen stated that he did not know what caused his rear wing failure on lap four, but was unconcerned because such failures were rare.

The result increased Michael Schumacher's lead in the World Drivers' Championship to 21 championship points. Montoya finishing second moved him ahead of his teammate Ralf Schumacher for second. Coulthard's third-place finish put him up to fourth, while Button fell to fifth after retiring from the race. Ferrari increased their lead in the World Constructors' Championship to seven championship points over Williams. McLaren and Renault retained third and fourth while Sauber moved into fifth with twelve races remaining in the season.

=== Race classification ===
Drivers who scored championship points are denoted in bold.

Pos	No	Driver	Constructor	Tyre	Laps	Time/Retired	Grid	Points
1	1	(Germany) **Michael Schumacher**	**Ferrari**	B	65	1:30:29.981	1	10
2	6	(Colombia) **Juan Pablo Montoya**	**Williams-BMW**	M	65	+35.630	4	6
3	3	(United Kingdom) **David Coulthard**	**McLaren-Mercedes**	M	65	+42.623	7	4
4	7	(Germany) **Nick Heidfeld**	**Sauber-Petronas**	B	65	+1:06.697	8	3
5	8	(Brazil) **Felipe Massa**	**Sauber-Petronas**	B	65	+1:18.973	11	2
6	20	(Germany) **Heinz-Harald Frentzen**	**Arrows-Cosworth**	B	65	+1:20.430	10	1
7	11	(Canada) Jacques Villeneuve	BAR-Honda	B	64	+1 Lap	15	
8	25	(United Kingdom) Allan McNish	Toyota	M	64	+1 Lap	19	
9	24	(Finland) Mika Salo	Toyota	M	64	+1 Lap	17	
10	14	(Italy) Jarno Trulli	Renault	M	63	Engine	9	
11	5	(Germany) Ralf Schumacher	Williams-BMW	M	63	Engine	3	
12	15	(United Kingdom) Jenson Button	Renault	M	60	Hydraulics	6	
Ret	12	(France) Olivier Panis	BAR-Honda	B	43	Exhaust	13	
Ret	16	(United Kingdom) Eddie Irvine	Jaguar-Cosworth	M	41	Hydraulics	20	
Ret	21	(Brazil) Enrique Bernoldi	Arrows-Cosworth	B	40	Hydraulics	14	
Ret	10	(Japan) Takuma Sato	Jordan-Honda	B	10	Spin	18	
Ret	9	(Italy) Giancarlo Fisichella	Jordan-Honda	B	5	Hydraulics	12	
Ret	4	(Finland) Kimi Räikkönen	McLaren-Mercedes	M	4	Rear wing	5	
Ret	17	(Spain) Pedro de la Rosa	Jaguar-Cosworth	M	2	Spin	16	
DNS	2	(Brazil) Rubens Barrichello	Ferrari	B	0	Gearbox	2	
WD	23	(Australia) Mark Webber	Minardi-Asiatech	M	—	Safety^{2}	—	
WD	22	(Malaysia) Alex Yoong	Minardi-Asiatech	M	—	Safety^{2}	—	

Notes

- **^2** – Minardi withdrew Mark Webber and Alex Yoong on the grounds of safety due to separate wing failures on their cars.

== Championship standings after the race ==
Drivers' Championship standings

+/–	Pos	Driver	Points
	1	(Germany) Michael Schumacher	44
1	2	(Colombia) Juan Pablo Montoya	23
1	3	(Germany) Ralf Schumacher	20
2	4	(United Kingdom) David Coulthard	9
1	5	(United Kingdom) Jenson Button	8

Constructors' Championship standings

+/–	Pos	Constructor	Points
	1	(Italy) Ferrari	50
	2	(United Kingdom) Williams-BMW	43
	3	(United Kingdom) McLaren-Mercedes	13
	4	(France) Renault	8
1	5	(Switzerland) Sauber-Petronas	8
Sources:

- Note: Only the top five positions are included for both sets of standings.

Previous race: 2002 San Marino Grand Prix	FIA Formula One World Championship; 2002 season	Next race: 2002 Austrian Grand Prix
Previous race: 2001 Spanish Grand Prix	Spanish Grand Prix	Next race: 2003 Spanish Grand Prix
