= Minardi PS01 =

Formula One racing car

Minardi PS01 Minardi PS01B
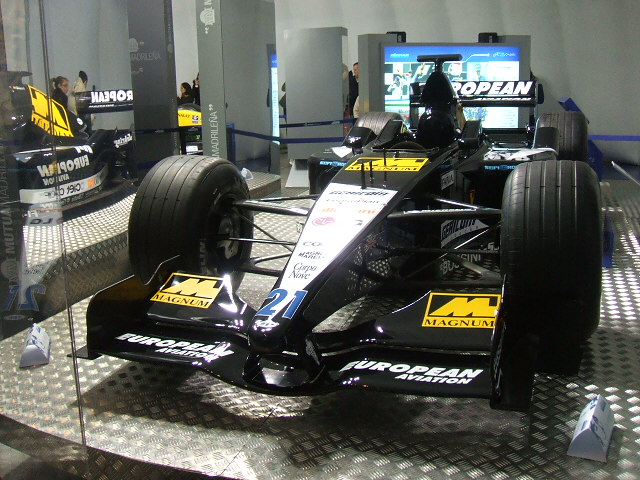
- Fernando Alonso's PS01 on display at Museo Fernando Alonso
- Category: Formula One
- Constructor: Minardi
- Designers: Gustav Brunner (Technical Director); Gabriele Tredozi (Chief Engineer); George Ryton (Chief Designer); Nigel Cowperthwaite (Chief Aerodynamicist)
- Predecessor: M02
- Successor: PS02

Technical specifications
- Chassis: Carbon fibre and aluminium honeycomb composite monocoque
- Suspension (front): pullrod-activated torsion springs, carbon-wrapped titanium wishbones
- Suspension (rear): pushrod-activated torsion springs and rockers, carbon-wrapped titanium wishbones
- Length: 4,509 mm (178 in)
- Width: 1,800 mm (71 in)
- Axle track: front: 1,480 mm (58 in) back: 1,410 mm (56 in)
- Engine: Ford VJ Zetec-R (badged as European) 3.0 L (183 cu in) V10 (72°) naturally-aspirated mid-engined
- Transmission: Minardi six-speed longitudinal semi-automatic sequential
- Power: 735 hp @ 16,000 rpm
- Weight: 600 kg (1,322.8 lb) (including driver and camera)
- Fuel: Elf
- Lubricants: Elf
- Brakes: Brembo
- Tyres: Michelin; OZ forged magnesium front: (13.0 x 12.0) rear: (13.0 x 13.7)

Competition history
- Notable drivers: 20. (Brazil) Tarso Marques; 20. (Malaysia) Alex Yoong; 21. (Spain) Fernando Alonso
- Debut: 2001 Australian Grand Prix
- Last event: 2001 Japanese Grand Prix
Races	Wins	Podiums	Poles	F/Laps
17	0	0	0	0

The Minardi PS01 (originally known as Minardi M03 and unofficially known as European Minardi PS01) was the car with which the Minardi team competed in the 2001 Formula One World Championship. It was initially driven by Brazilian Tarso Marques, who returned to the team after last driving an F1 car in 1997, and Fernando Alonso, a Spanish rookie who had graduated from Formula 3000 and was in a long-term contract to Flavio Briatore's driver management scheme.

== Background ==
The PS01 marked a new beginning for Minardi. The chassis designation referred to the fact that it was the first car to be raced under the ownership of Paul Stoddart, who had bought the team from the terminally-ill Gabriele Rumi only two months before the first race of the season. In between, the PS01 was hurriedly built, with Marques' car still being assembled at the Australian GP. The car was a tidy, efficient design by Gustav Brunner, but it was hamstrung by a lack of testing and horsepower from an elderly engine (which was badged "European", after Stoddart's aviation company).

Despite this lack of preparation, the cars were surprisingly competitive, with Marques only failing to qualify once and future champion Alonso able to compete in the lower reaches of the midfield. However, the team scored no points and were hit hard when Brunner defected to the fledgling Toyota F1 team mid-season. As the season drew to a close, the frustrated Marques agreed to leave the team, allowing the well-funded Alex Yoong to become Malaysia's first F1 driver.

The team also raced an updated car, featuring a revised rear end and gearbox, from the Belgian GP onwards. This chassis was designated as the Minardi PS01B. Marques first used the B-spec version already in the Hungarian GP.

== Concept and construction ==
The car was created by Austrian designer Gustav Brunner for the Italian Minardi team in Faenza during the 2001 season of the Formula One motor racing World Championship. At the end of the previous season the technical partnership with Italian manufacturer Fondmetal had ended who had provided Minardi with the aerodynamic design, wind tunnel and model making facilities for the PS01. Minardi were thus required to take the new car's design in-house but continued with a limited use of Fondmetal's wind tunnel. A contract with Supertec to supply Minardi with engines fell through and resulted in the designers stopping construction on the PS01.

On 30 January 2001 the chairman and chief executive of European Aviation Paul Stoddart acquired a 70% stake in Minardi from shareholders Gabriele Rumi and Minardi team founder Giancarlo Minardi. The team would be managed by former Tyrrell team principal Rupert Mainwaring with the Italian section being run by experienced Minardi employee Frederic Dhainaut. Minardi's 100 employees would work alongside the 45 employees European Formula Racing based in Ledbury and communication between the two divisions would be maintained by regular air flights, allowing faster transfer of employees and car parts. Because of the uncertainty of what engine Minardi would be using Brunner re-designed the PS01 four times and the cars were hurriedly built in time for the season-opening race in Melbourne.

One chassis was built for the crash tests which took place on 5 February with Minardi opting to be conservative with the side impact structures and preferred to shift extra weight over the possibility of damaging the PS01's tub for failing the crash test. A shakedown of the PS01 took place on 21 February at the Autodromo di Vairano where thirty laps were completed and system checks were conducted and an aero-balance test took place. The PS01 was launched on the morning of 28 February 2001 at Parliament House, Melbourne. Stoddart hoped Minardi would secure tenth place or higher in the Constructors' Championship and stated he had a five-year plan to get the team running in the mid-field.

During the season the Minardi centers at Faenza and Ledbury were expanded and refined, with the latter hosting the research and development section and the Minardi test team and worked to secure sub-contract work from outside sources to allow for more control over component manufacturing and the process of production. Brunner left the team in May 2001 to become the chief designer of Toyota's Formula One project, Minardi's technical coordinator Gabriele Tredozi became their technical director and took over responsibility for the PS01 chassis development program and oversaw the construction of a revised titanium gearbox which incorporated a revised rear suspension for the cars.

== Racing history ==
At the season-opening Australian Grand Prix, Alonso and Marques set the nineteenth and twenty-second quickest times in qualifying: Marques failed to make the 107% mark after spinning into the gravel in his race car but was allowed to race at the discretion of the stewards, but this was despite the fact that he had not managed to set a time within the 107% mark in any session all weekend. Marques' car only lasted four laps of the race before retiring with an engine problem caused by a misfiring battery, but Alonso finished twelfth for the car's first classified finish, albeit two laps adrift of the winner but one lap ahead of Giancarlo Fisichella's thirteenth-placed Benetton. Minardi had a spare car completed in time for the Malaysian round. Marques and Alonso started twentieth and twenty-first on the grid as Arrows driver Enrique Bernoldi was sent to the rear of the field for running his front wing too low to the ground. In the race, which was held in mixed weather conditions, both drivers achieved the Minardi PS01's first double finish, with Alonso and Marques finishing in thirteenth and fourteenth positions respectively; Marques had a punctured right-rear tyre which damaged his rear wing and the Minardi team lost communication with both drivers and personnel when a torrential downpour hit the circuit and damaged their equipment early in the race.

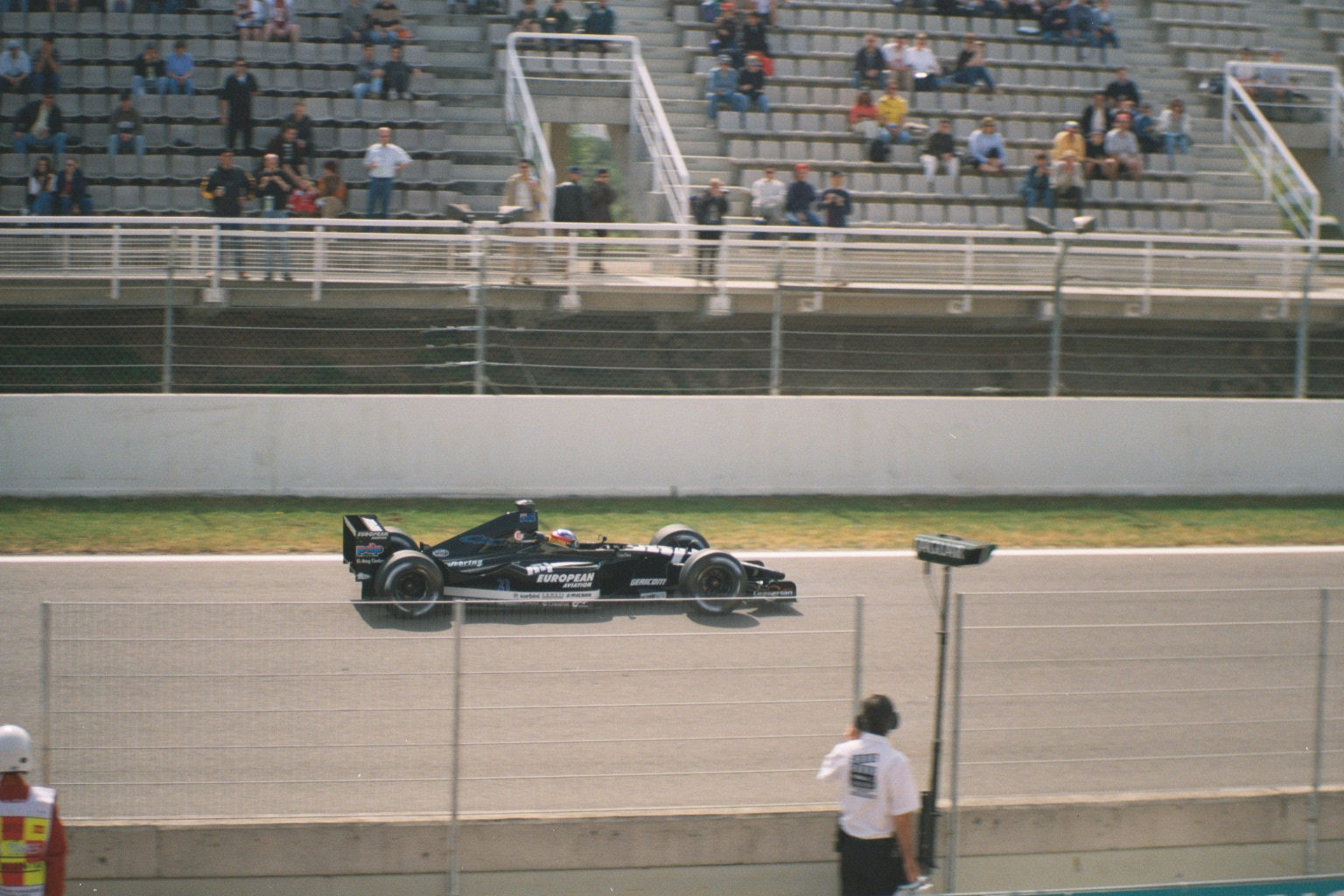
Alonso at the Spanish Grand Prix

At the Brazilian Grand Prix, Alonso qualified in nineteenth position, ahead of Jenson Button and Gastón Mazzacane, with Marques starting at the rear of the field in twenty-second. During the race, Marques achieved the best result for the PS01 with ninth place, whilst Alonso retired after completing twenty-six laps with an issue with his throttle potentiometer which affected his engine's behaviour. At the San Marino round, Alonso started in eighteenth, ahead of both Benetton cars and Mazzacane, whilst Marques qualified twenty-second for the second consecutive Grand Prix. In the race, Alonso crashed out heavily on the sixth lap which was caused by a leaking brake caliper and Marques retired on the race's fifty-fourth lap with a fuel line problem. At the Spanish Grand Prix Alonso outqualified Marques by one and a half seconds after alterations were made to Alonso's car; the drivers started from eighteenth and twenty-second on the grid and were sandwiched by the Benetton drivers and Jaguar's Pedro de la Rosa. Alonso ran strongly in the race and finished in thirteenth position and Marques took sixteenth despite struggling with handling problems throughout. Two weeks later in the Austrian Grand Prix Alonso clinched his third consecutive eighteenth position in qualifying whilst Marques set the twenty-second fastest time and was separated by both Benetton cars and Jean Alesi in a Prost. Alonso and Marques ran in the midfield early in the race but both drivers retired after forty laps because of gearbox issues.

Alonso continued his good form in qualifying at the Monaco Grand Prix where he took eighteenth place whilst Marques in twenty-second was behind the Arrows pairing of Jos Verstappen and Bernoldi as well as Luciano Burti's Prost. Both Alonso and Marques again ran strongly in the race running in the mid-field before both drivers retired after three-quarter distance with mechanical issues. At the Canadian Grand Prix Alonso had originally qualified in twenty-first but had his fastest qualifying lap time disallowed because of a front wing technical infringement and was required to start behind teammate Marques in twenty-second. Marques equalled his best result of the season with a ninth-place finish despite struggling from blistering tyres and broken bargeboard mountings in the race's final ten laps, whilst Alonso retired after seven laps because of a broken driveshaft CV joint. The cars again occupied the back row of the grid at the European Grand Prix with Alonso ahead of Marques. The PS01s were both nearly four seconds off the polesitter's time, but only four-thousands of a second behind Button. Marques retired after completing seven laps from a voltage fluctuation in his electronics system which broke his gearbox and shut down his engine, whilst Alonso moved from twenty-first to finish fourteenth. Alonso outqualified Marques by four tenths of a second in the French Grand Prix and both drivers again shared the back row of the grid. In the race, which was held in hot weather conditions meaning there was an increased likelihood of mechanical attrition, Marques finished in fifteenth place whilst Alonso was called into his garage five laps before the race concluded with a suspected engine problems located on the Minardi telemetry equipment, although he was classified in seventeenth place.

At the British Grand Prix Alonso set the twenty-first fastest lap time in qualifying, but Marques fell foul of the 107% rule for the second time in the season and was not allowed to start by the stewards on this occasion. The Brazilian had experienced a throttle problem with his car, and with the spare car set up for Alonso, there was no time to change the settings to allow Marques to use it. During the race, Alonso had moved from twenty-first to fourteenth by the 38th lap and raced competitively with the Benetton cars and Bernoldi's Arrows before his left-front hand wheel became detached from his car which necessitated an unscheduled pit stop and finished in sixteenth. Both drivers lined up at the rear of the field for the German Grand Prix with Alonso out-qualifying Marques by eight tenths of a second. For the race both drivers started from the pit lane because of technical difficulties; the Grand Prix was halted on the first lap because of a major accident involving Burti and Ferrari's Michael Schumacher. Both Minardi cars underwent further repairs for the restart with Alonso and Marques making their way up the field as some of their rivals retired from the race; Marques retired after twenty-seven laps with a gearbox issue whilst Alonso claimed his best result of the season with a tenth-place finish. Alonso took eighteenth on the grid at the Hungarian Grand Prix with Marques starting twenty-second and were separated by Burti's Prost and the two Arrows. Alonso moved up several places at the start of the race and matched the pace of his main rivals before his rear wheels locked up resulting from braking difficulties and retired after going into a gravel trap on the Hungaroring circuit on lap 37 whilst Marques was ordered by Minardi via radio to switch off his engine because of concerns over his engine oil pressure on the race's 64th lap.

During preparation for the Belgian Grand Prix, the team announced that Malaysian driver Alex Yoong would replace under-fire Marques from at the Italian Grand Prix onwards. Marques remained at the team as their test and reserve driver, and assisted in developing Minardi's 2002 car, the PS02. The qualifying session in Belgium was held in wet weather conditions and where which the track steadily dried and saw Alonso and Marques fail to record a lap time within 107% of the pole sitters time; both drivers were allowed to start the race and were sandwiched by Bernoldi. Before the event Alonso used the spare Minardi monocoque after a heavy accident in the event's warm-up session and Marques stalled his engine at the first start; since he started last, the penalty was nullified. Alonso retired from the race after two and a half laps because of gear selection problems whilst Marques finished in fourteenth place despite encountering suspension issues and a punctured tyre. In his first Formula One qualifying session, Yoong qualified in twenty-second position behind Alonso. Yoong drove strongly in the race and ran as high as fifteenth behind Alonso before spinning off eight laps before the finish; Alonso also drove strongly to claim thirteenth position. At the United States Grand Prix Alonso clinched his best qualifying result of the season with seventeenth place and Yoong qualified at the rear of the field in twenty-second. Both drivers retired from the race; Alonso after 36 laps with a broken driveshaft during a pit stop and Yoong pulled over to the side of the circuit two laps later with a gear selection issue. At the final race of the season in Japan Alonso started from eighteenth on the grid with Yoong again taking the twenty-second position. Yoong started from the pit lane after his mechanics worked to rectify an electrical problem on his race car and finished his first Formula One race in sixteenth place and Alonso ran strongly to finish in eleventh.

The team were unclassified in the Constructors' Championship, with no points.

== Sponsorship and livery ==
With the departure of Telefónica and Fondmetal and the acquisition of the team by Stoddart, the car's livery reflected the change in ownership with a mostly black livery and sponsorship from Stoddart's European Aviation.From the Belgian Grand Prix onwards, the Malaysian gambling company Magnum appeared on the car's engine cover, a sponsorship that arrived alongside Alex Yoong.

== Minardi F1x2 ==
Minardi Thunder in the Park event at Donington Park on 21 August 2001 which feature multiple drive by the fleet of 8 Minardi F1x2 driven by Nigel Mansell, Alex Yoong, Fernando Alonso, Tarso Marques and team boss Paul Stoddart. To finish the event a race between the 5 two-seaters took place with a spectacular finish when Mansell crash into the car driven by Alonso.

== Complete Formula One results ==
(key) (results in bold indicate pole position)

Year	Team	Engine	Tyres	Drivers	1	2	3	4	5	6	7	8	9	10	11	12	13	14	15	16	17	Points	WCC
2001	Minardi	European V10*	**M**		AUS	MAL	BRA	SMR	ESP	AUT	MON	CAN	EUR	FRA	GBR	GER	HUN	BEL	ITA	USA	JPN	0	NC
2001	Minardi	European V10*	**M**	(Brazil) Tarso Marques	Ret	14	9	Ret	16	Ret	Ret	9	Ret	15	DNQ	Ret	Ret	13				0	NC
2001	Minardi	European V10*	**M**	(Malaysia) Alex Yoong															Ret	Ret	16	0	NC
2001	Minardi	European V10*	**M**	(Spain) Fernando Alonso	12	13	Ret	Ret	13	Ret	Ret	Ret	14	17^{†}	16	10	Ret	DNS	13	Ret	11	0	NC

* Denotes Ford-built engines designed by Cosworth, badged as European
