= Asiatech Data Transmission =

Iranian technology company

Asiatech Data Transmission traded Asiatech is an Iranian content delivery network, mobile virtual network operator, VPS, website hosting service and broadband provider based in Tehran. Asiatech operates a National datacenter based in Milad Tower.

In October 2023 it started cloud.ir content delivery network platform.

It received united network services license, FTTX license and finance from Iranian Minister of ICT in 2023.

In 2020s Iranian ISP Hiweb which was backed by Vodafon tried to acquire asiatech and parsonline but ultimately asiatech was not merged due to corporate structural decisions.

== Products ==
It also runs streaming service تماشاخونه

- Iaas
- Paas
- Saas

When Abr Arvan was hacked in 2022 it offered to provide colocation enabled datacenters.
