= Asia Motor Technologies France =

Formula One engine manufacturer

Asiatech
- Type: SAS
- Industry: Automotive
- Founded: December 13, 1999; 26 years ago in Vélizy-Villacoublay, France
- Defunct: November 14, 2002
- Headquarters: Vélizy-Villacoublay, France
- Key people: John Gano (Finance Director); Enrique Scalabroni (Technical Director)
- Number of employees: 221 (2002)

Asiatech as a Formula One engine manufacturer
Formula One World Championship career
- First entry: 2001 Australian Grand Prix
- Last entry: 2002 Japanese Grand Prix
- Races entered: 34 (33 starts)
- Chassis: Arrows, Minardi
- Constructors' Championships: 0
- Drivers' Championships: 0
- Race victories: 0
- Podiums: 0
- Points: 3
- Pole positions: 0
- Fastest laps: 0

Asiatech was the trade name of Asia Motor Technologies France, a company founded in 2000 by Japanese private capital under the leadership of Dr. John Gano and Enrique Scalabroni, which purchased the assets of the Peugeot Formula One programme at the end of the 2000 season.

Its mandate was to acquire top-level European engine technology for Asia and to create an Asian-themed F1 team. It increased staffing from 170 to 221 employees, supplied its engines in development for testing at no cost to minor teams in 2001 and 2002, and had designed and presented the wind-tunnel model of its original F1 chassis when its Japanese private funding was cut in 2002. Asiatech returned the staff and facilities it had acquired back to Peugeot and wound down at the end of the 2002 season.

== History ==
Before the official name "Asiatech" was adopted, the purchasers of Peugeot Sport F1 were only known under the trade name of Asia Motor Technologies (AMT). This is reflected in the video game Formula One 2001, where Arrows' engine supplier is named "AMT" instead of Asiatech.

In 2001, Asiatech supplied their V10 engines (which were updated and rebadged Peugeot V10 engines) to the Arrows Formula One team free of charge. For 2002 it tried for better results with Minardi. In that year, Arrows, that rented Cosworth engines, ran out of funding in mid-season 2002 and was liquidated. In that 2002 season, Asiatech's engine reliability increased to finish in fourth place out of the nine F1 engine suppliers, tied with BMW for reliability. Four out of the Minardi team’s 14 retirements during the season were engine-related.

Asiatech was also concurrently working on a GT sportscar design using a compact new engine, as well as having completed the complete design of an LMP1 sports car.

In 2002, Asiatech began considering the possibility of starting their own Formula One team, and purchased the former Williams Touring Car design office in Didcot. Sergio Rinland, alongside former Brabham designer Ron Tauranac were recruited by Scalabroni to design the teams first Formula One car. The car was to be firstly a testbed for Asiatech engines, then subsequently entered in the 2004 season. By May, there were reports that for the 2003 season Asiatech could supply Jordan with engines, or even buy the team out. These came after Honda decided to concentrate their engine efforts on the BAR team, and announced they would be withdrawing supply from Eddie Jordan's team at the end of the 2002 season. However, when its Japanese private funding, reportedly from an heir to Sony, was cut off during the 2002 season, it announced its shutdown on 3 November 2002, with staff returning to Peugeot or moving on to Renault and other F1 engine programs. Some of the team's employees attempted to form a design and consultancy company as 'Design Tech Centre' but were unsuccessful.

In February 2003, the assets of the Asiatech engine company were sold in an auction in Paris, overseen by Jacques Martin and Gilles Chausselat. Included in the auction were eighteen engines, a dyno, a variety of machine tools, plus electronic measuring equipment amongst other things.

== Complete Formula One World Championship results ==
(key) (Races in bold indicate pole position) (Races in italics indicate fastest lap)

Year	Entrant	Chassis	Engine	Tyres	Drivers	1	2	3	4	5	6	7	8	9	10	11	12	13	14	15	16	17	Points	WCC
2001	Orange Arrows Asiatech	Arrows A22	001 3.0 V10	B		AUS	MAL	BRA	SMR	ESP	AUT	MON	CAN	EUR	FRA	GBR	GER	HUN	BEL	ITA	USA	JPN	1	10th
2001	Orange Arrows Asiatech	Arrows A22	001 3.0 V10	B	(Netherlands) Jos Verstappen	10	7	Ret	Ret	12	6	8	10^{†}	Ret	13	10	9	12	10	Ret	Ret	15	1	10th
2001	Orange Arrows Asiatech	Arrows A22	001 3.0 V10	B	(Brazil) Enrique Bernoldi	Ret	Ret	Ret	10	Ret	Ret	9	Ret	Ret	Ret	14	8	Ret	12	Ret	13	14	1	10th
2002	KL Minardi Asiatech	Minardi PS02	AT02 3.0 V10	MI		AUS	MAL	BRA	SMR	ESP	AUT	MON	CAN	EUR	GBR	FRA	GER	HUN	BEL	ITA	USA	JPN	2	9th
2002	KL Minardi Asiatech	Minardi PS02	AT02 3.0 V10	MI	(Malaysia) Alex Yoong	7	Ret	13	DNQ	WD	Ret	Ret	14	Ret	DNQ	10	DNQ			13	Ret	Ret	2	9th
2002	KL Minardi Asiatech	Minardi PS02	AT02 3.0 V10	MI	(United Kingdom) Anthony Davidson													Ret	Ret				2	9th
2002	KL Minardi Asiatech	Minardi PS02	AT02 3.0 V10	MI	(Australia) Mark Webber	5	Ret	11	11	WD	12	11	11	15	Ret	8	Ret	16	Ret	Ret	Ret	10	2	9th

== Gallery ==
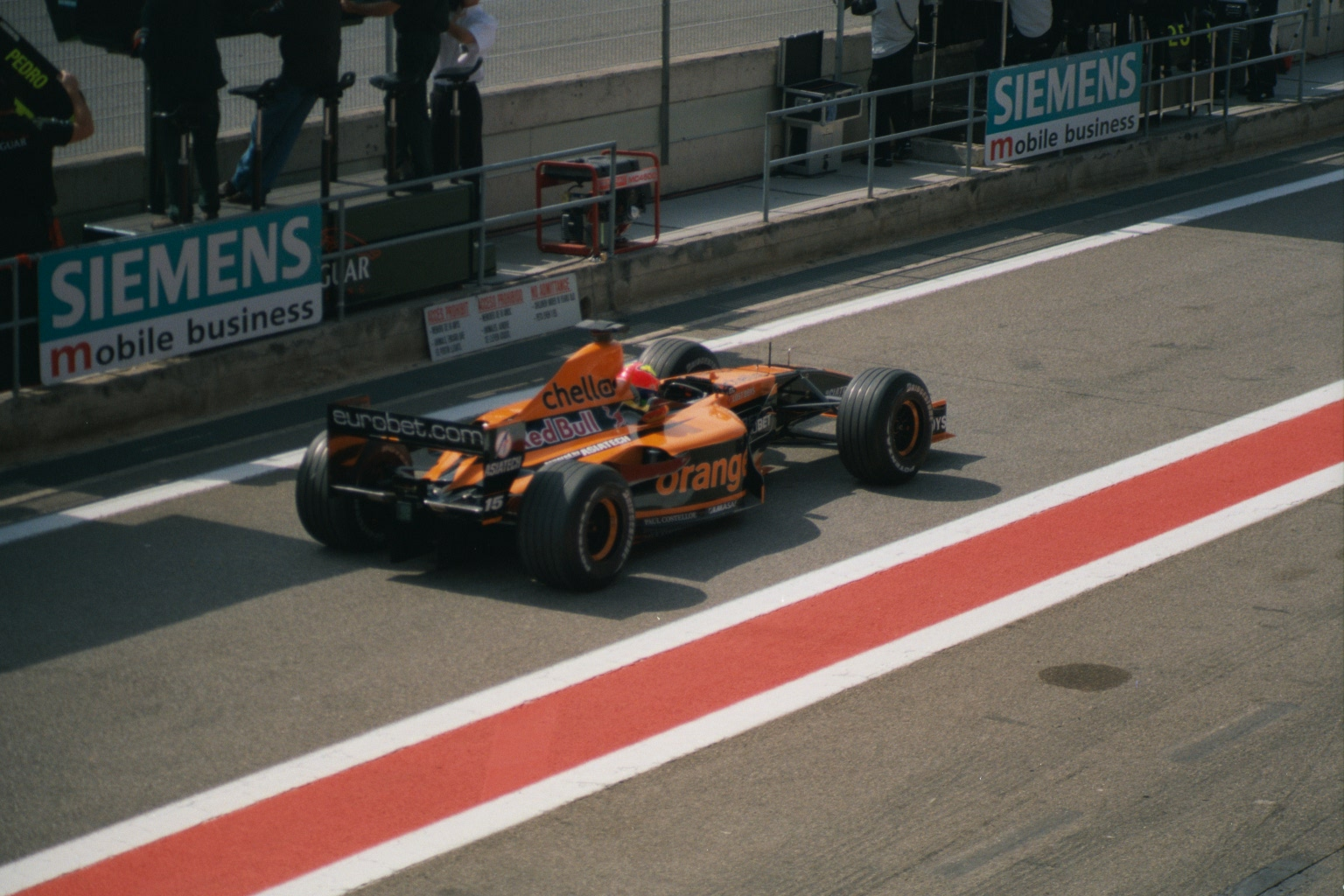
Enrique Bernoldi in the Arrows Asiatech A22 at the 2001 Spanish Grand Prix

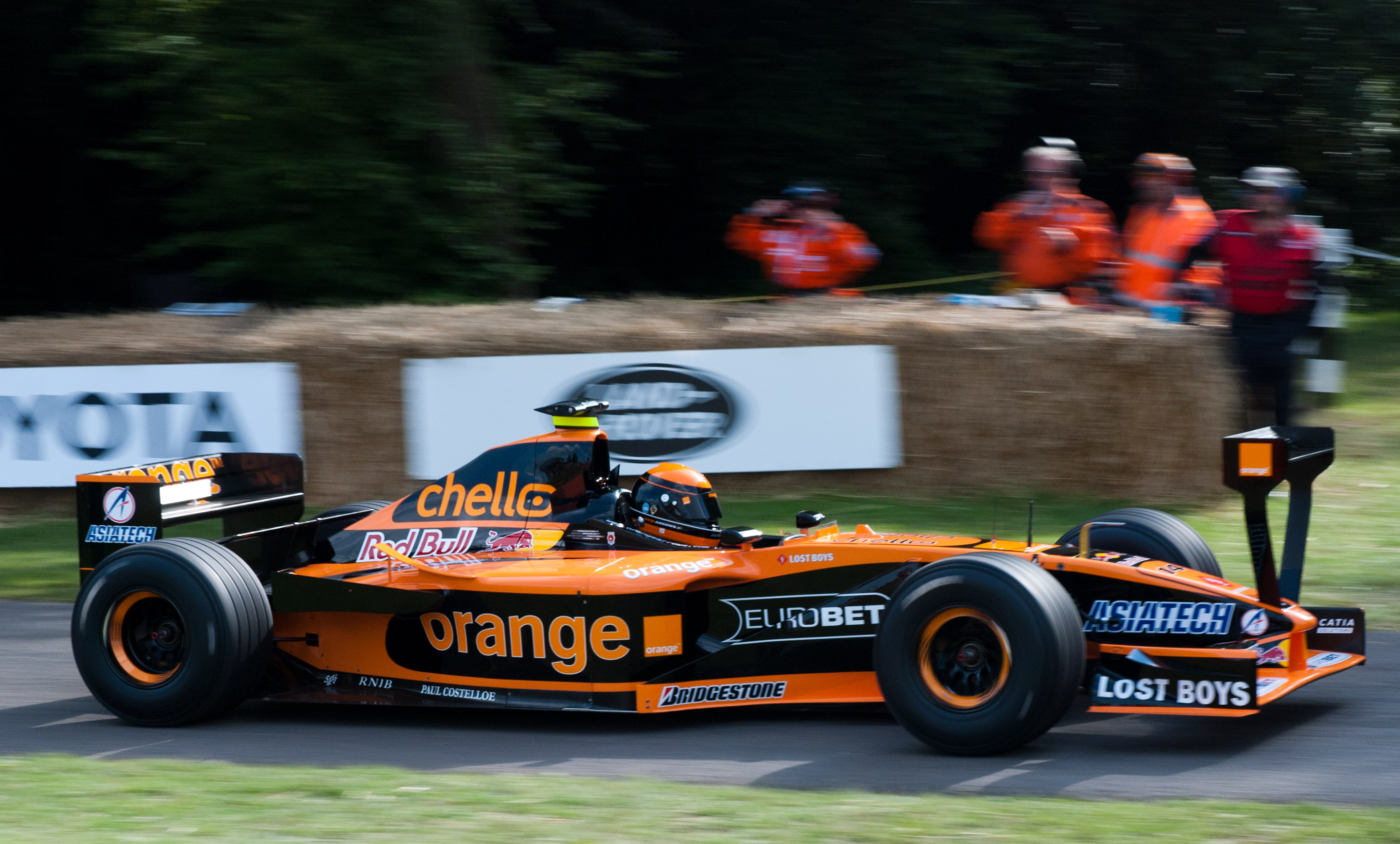
Arrows Asiatech A22 at Goodwood Festival of Speed, 2011

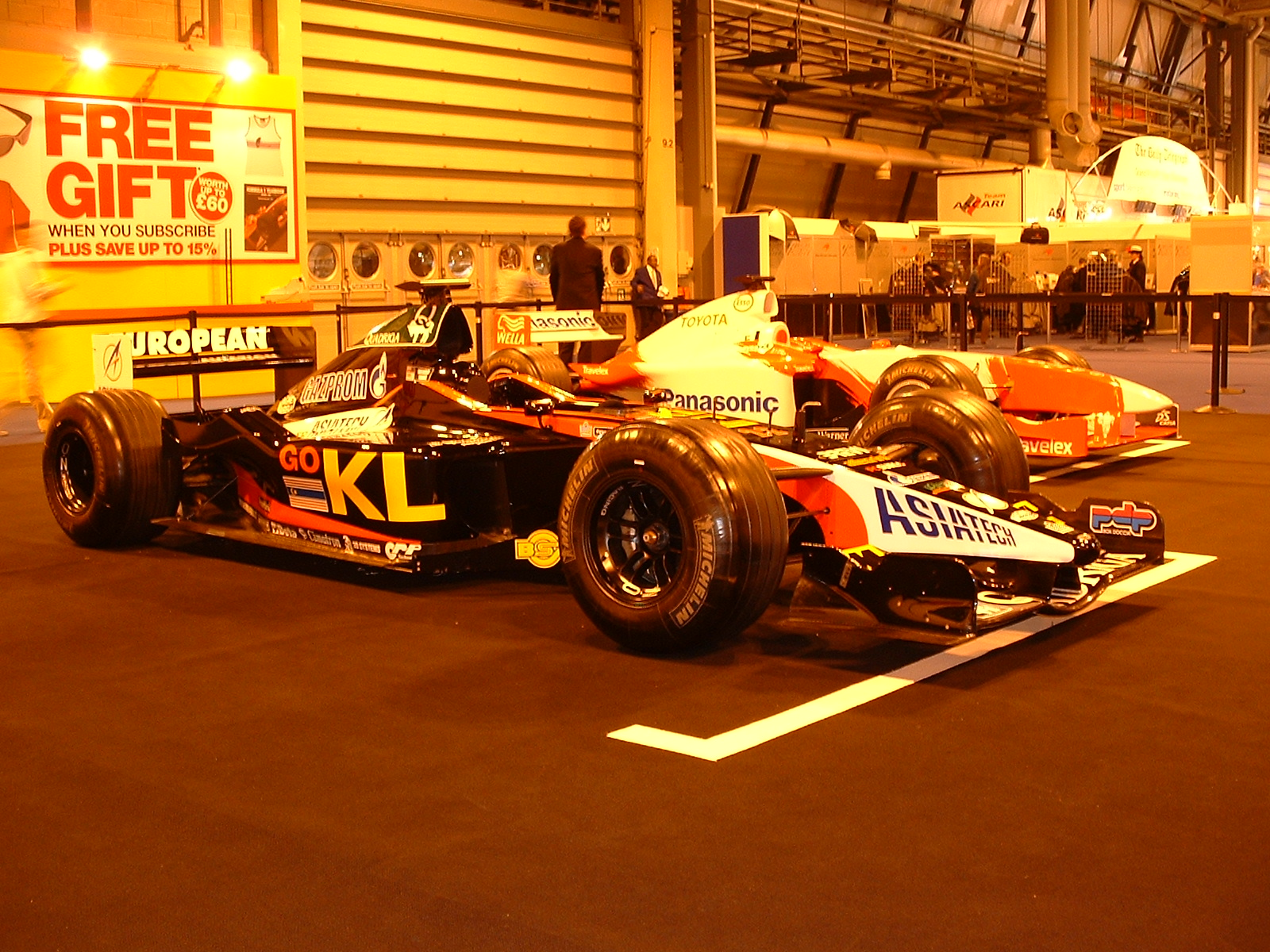
Minardi PS02 with prominent Asiatech branding at the 2003 Autosport International Show
