= Paul Stoddart =

Australian businessman

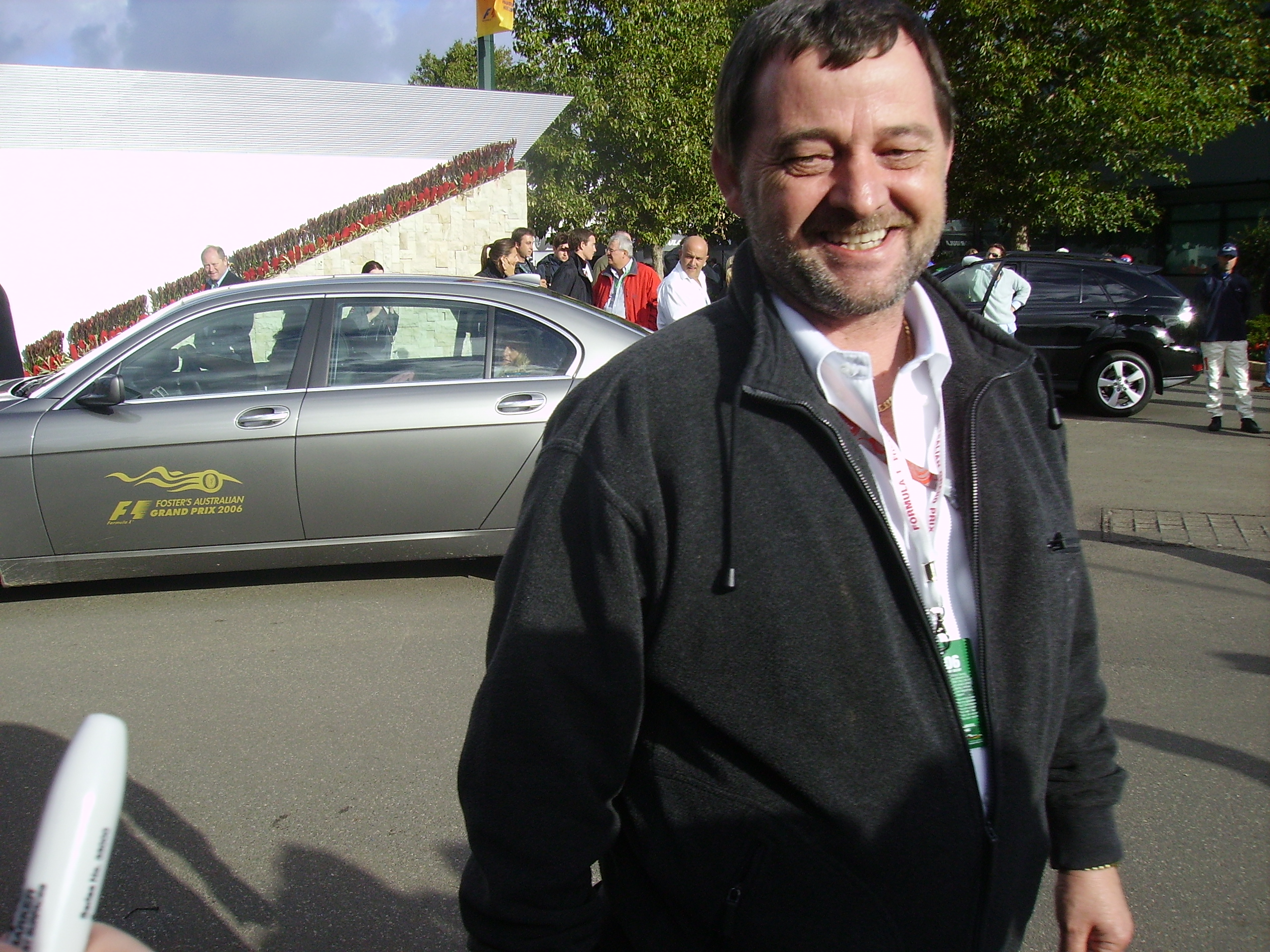
- Stoddart at the 2006 Australian Grand Prix
- Born: Paul Gerard Stoddart; 26 May 1955 (age 70); Coburg, Victoria, Australia
- Occupations: Businessman and former Formula One Team owner
- Known for: Minardi; European Aviation; OzJet

Paul Gerard Stoddart (born 26 May 1955) is an Australian businessman, airline owner and former Minardi Formula One team boss.

== Personal life ==
Born in Coburg, a suburb of Melbourne, Victoria, Australia, and attended Preston Technical School and St Joseph's College Melbourne. Stoddart's first business was a car dealership. He was later based in England and was the Yugo car distributor for the UK and also had a hire car detailing business in Manchester detailing the ex-hire cars before sale to the public.

== Aviation ==
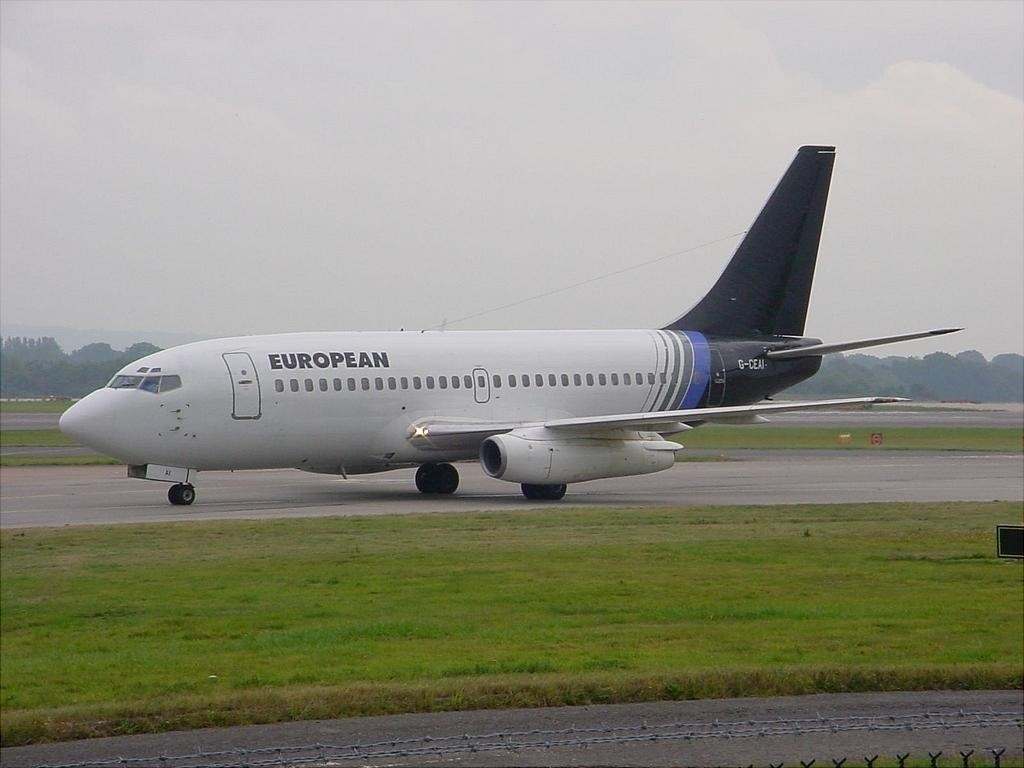
European Aviation Boeing 737-229

=== European Aviation ===
In late 1989, Stoddart purchased two BAC 1-11 aircraft and three Falcon 20 business jets (and a large assortment of spare parts for both aircraft) from the Royal Australian Air Force's 'VIP Squad' (the Canberra-based No 34 SQN). Stoddart formed European Aviation, hired Trevor Whetter from British Aerospace as his Managing Director and sold the BAC 1-11 aircraft to Okada Air in Nigeria. Following discussions with British Airways, Stoddart purchased 16 aircraft, and following Dan Air's absorption into British Airways, the airline was formed in 1994.

During the COVID-19 pandemic, Airbus A340 aircraft, acquired from Etihad Airways and owned by Stoddart's business were used to transport PPE from China and Malaysia back to the UK.

=== OzJet ===
In 2005, Stoddart formed OzJet an Australian based, all business class airline. He wanted to challenge Qantas who at the time were the only domestic carrier with this luxury option. The airline flew with three Boeing 737 aircraft that had 60 seats. It was not a commercial success, and in March 2006 Stoddart cancelled its commercial service and turned it into a charter airline. In 2009, OzJet was sold to Air Australia.

== Formula One & ChampCar ==
=== Tyrrell ===
In 1996, Stoddart purchased a 1990 Tyrrell 019 Formula One car. During this time, he connected with Rupert Mainwaring the team manager at Tyrrell. In 1997, Stoddart sponsored the team with his company, European Aviation, appearing on the front wing of the car and in 1998 the rear. Stoddart's relationship with owner Ken Tyrrell grew, and the two were discussing building a wind tunnel at Stoddart's base at Bournemouth Airport. Tyrrell was lining up the sale of the team to Stoddart and in 1997, a deal of $25 million was almost agreed upon. However, British American Tobacco ultimately would purchase Tyrrell and enter the 1999 season as British American Racing. Stoddart purchased a volume of Tyrrell cars and equipment and moved them to his base in Ledbury, Herefordshire.

=== Jordan & Arrows ===
In 1999, European Aviation sponsored the Jordan Grand Prix team. There was speculation he would purchase a minority shareholding in the team from owner Eddie Jordan.

European Aviation moved on to sponsor Arrows in 2000 and his European Racing became the Arrows Junior Team, with driver Mark Webber.

=== Minardi ===
In 2001, Stoddart purchased Minardi when Gabriele Rumi sold the team to him prior to the 2001 Formula One Season. From purchase to the first race the team completed the PS01 in six weeks. The car was emblazoned with European Aviation sponsorship and used an uprated version of the 2000 Minardi Fondmetal V10. Whilst perennial backmarkers, during 2001 future world champion Fernando Alonso drove for the team and was rated highly. In 2002, Stoddart hired Australian Mark Webber who scored points on his debut at the 2002 Australian Grand Prix.

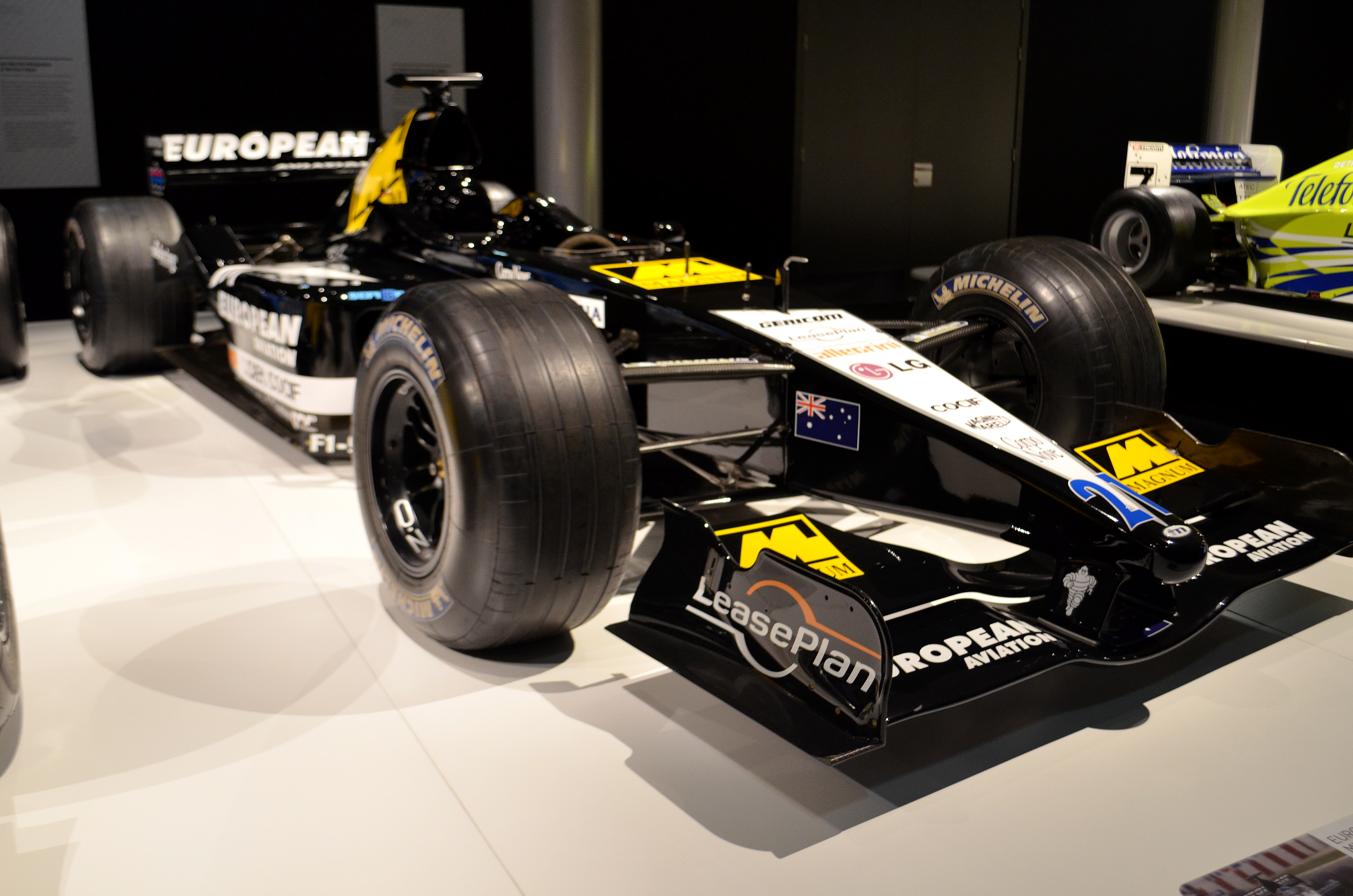
Minardi PS01 - Stoddart's first car as team owner

Finances were always a challenge for the team, as was sponsorship. In 2003, Formula One owner Bernie Ecclestone invested $4 million into the struggling team. Wilux became a lead sponsor in 2004, however terminated their agreement after they were not told the team would run without logos at the 2004 British Grand Prix. Stoddart had elected to run blank cars due to the death of Minardi sporting director John Walton. In 2005, the team was sponsored by another Stoddart firm—OzJet. One of the team's greatest successes under Stoddart's ownership would come at the 2005 United States Grand Prix where just six cars competed—Minardi scoring 7 points with both cars finishing.

Throughout his ownership, Stoddart regularly campaigned for budget caps and greater consideration of financial incentives to smaller teams like his own. This included a public battle with McLaren boss Ron Dennis. When Eddie Jordan sold Jordan Grand Prix to Alex Shnaider in 2005, Stoddart expressed concerns for his team's future. On 12 September 2005, Stoddart announced that he had sold the team to Red Bull Racing owner Dietrich Mateschitz who subsequently rebranded the team as Toro Rosso.

In March 2006, less than a year after selling his team to Red Bull, Stoddart announced his intentions to return the Minardi name to Formula One after lodging an entry with the FIA for the 2008 championship season. However, rival entry Prodrive were awarded the 12th and final place on the grid (which they ultimately did not use).

=== F1 Experience ===
With the new F1 management wanting to expand the F1 experience for fans, starting from the 2017 Spanish Grand Prix Stoddart is offering fans the ability to ride in one of his Minardi Fx2 cars.

=== Minardi Team USA ===
In December 2006 Stoddart purchased the CTE-HVM ChampCar team which he renamed Minardi Team USA. The team was successful, with Robert Doornbos finishing third overall and taking the Rookie of the Year honours. However, a month before the 2008 season, ChampCar was absorbed by the rival Indy Racing League. Although enthusiastic about the future of the series, Stoddart opted not to enter it, fearing that he and the other ex-ChampCar teams would be unable to be competitive. However, the half of the team owned by Keith Wiggins continued on as HVM Racing in the IRL.
