= European Aviation Air Charter =

British airline

IATA	ICAO	Call sign
E7	EAF	EUROCHARTER
- Founded: 1989 (as European Aviation)
- Ceased operations: 1 December 2008
- Hubs: Bournemouth Airport
- Fleet size: 6
- Destinations: N/A
- Parent company: European Aviation
- Headquarters: Bournemouth Airport; European Hall, Ledbury
- Key people: Paul Stoddart (chairman); Trevor Whetter (managing director)
- Website: http://www.eaac.co.uk

European Aviation Air Charter was an airline based in Bournemouth, United Kingdom. It operated ad hoc charter services, VIP flights, and inclusive-tour and sub-charter flights, as well as ACMI wet leases for other airlines. Its main base was Bournemouth Airport. The company went into administration on Tuesday 2 December 2008.

European Aviation Air Charter Limited held a United Kingdom Civil Aviation Authority Type A Operating Licence. It was permitted to carry passengers, cargo and mail on aircraft with 20 or more seats.

== History ==
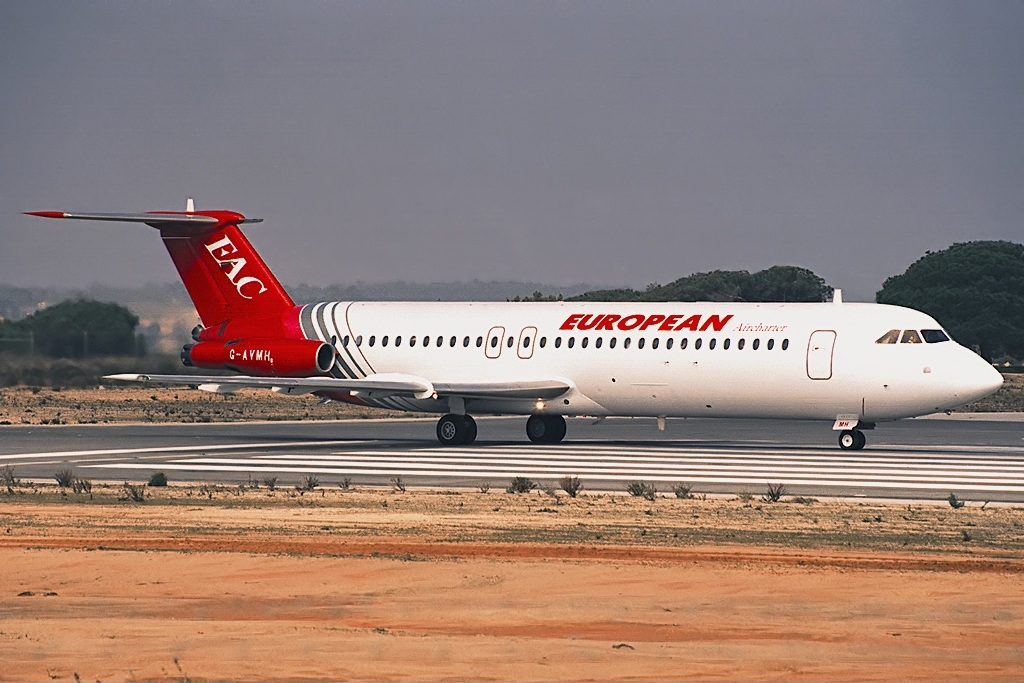
European Air Charter BAC 1-11 (G-AVMH) at Faro Airport, Portugal in 1994

In late 1989, European Aviation was formed when owner Paul Stoddart purchased two BAC 1-11 aircraft and three Falcon 20 business jets (and a large assortment of spare parts for both aircraft) from the Royal Australian Air Force's 'VIP Squad' (the Canberra-based No 34 SQN). Stoddart hired Trevor Whetter from British Aerospace as his Managing Director and sold the BAC 1-11 aircraft to Okada Air in Nigeria. European Aviation were based from Bournemouth Airport.

In 1993, the company directors took the decision of changing European Aviation's name to European Aviation Air Charter, or EAC for short. That same year, twenty other BAC-111s were bought from British Airways following the British airlines absorption of Dan Air. This meant the airline could include tour groups among its charter clients. By 2000, European Air Charter had acquired eight Boeing 737 aircraft formerly of Belgian Airline, Sabena. They would be in operation with the company until 2006, with brief leases to Palmair and OzJet.

In 2001, European Air Charter had acquired seven Boeing 747 aircraft from British Airways. Later, adding an eighth from Cathay Pacific. Seven of the aircraft were utilised in long haul service to destinations such as New York City, Chicago and other United States and Canadian locations. Agreements were signed with Palmair, however by 2004 European Air Charter had disposed of their Boeing 747 aircraft. During their ownership of the 747 aircraft, they were also utilised for servicing the Minardi Formula One Team, now owned by Stoddart.

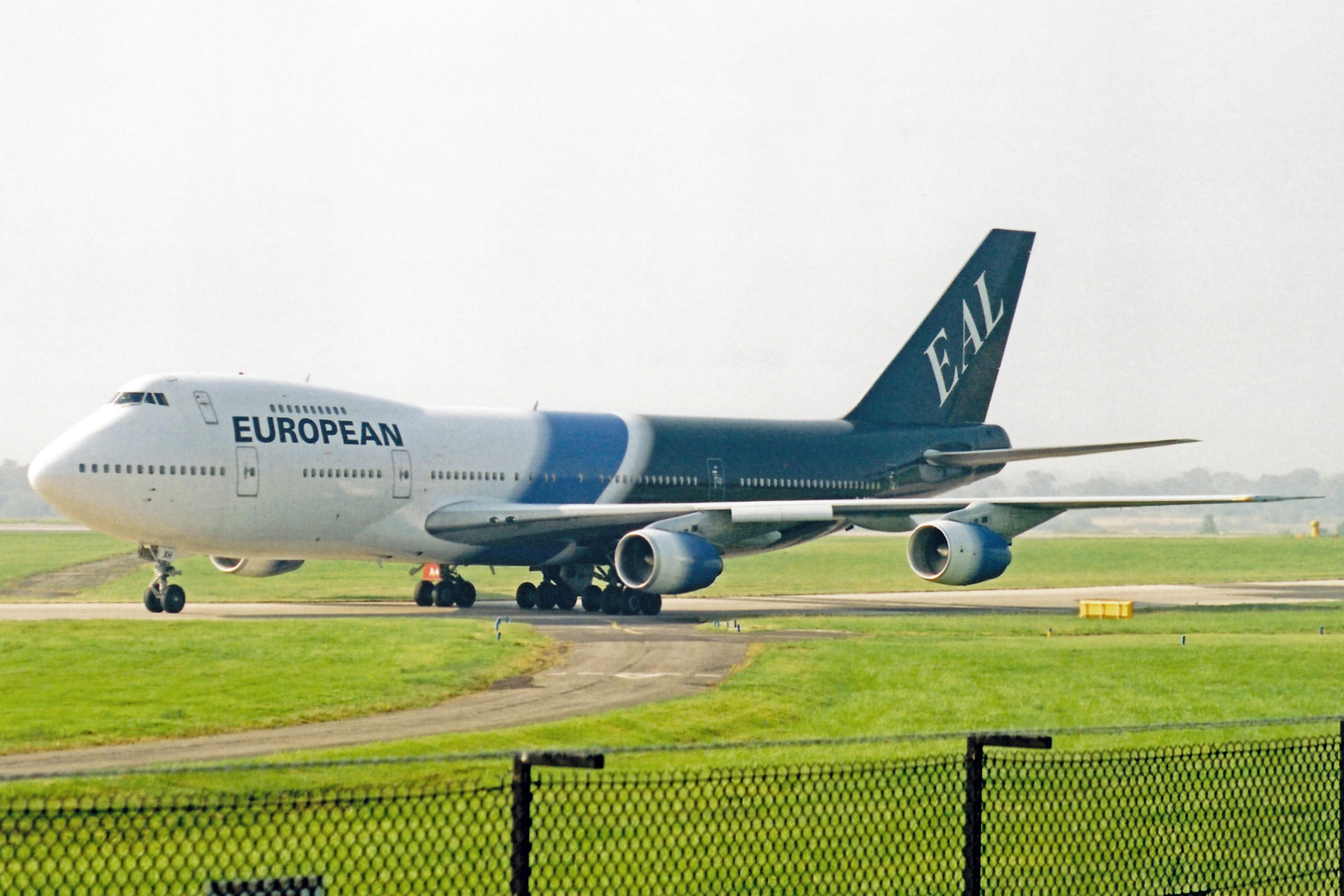
European Air Charter Boeing 747-200 (G-BDXH) at Manchester Airport in 2003

In 2002, Stoddart sold European Air Charter to the Bath Family, owners of Palmair. The Bath Family continued operating European Air Charter until 2004, when Stoddart bought the airline back. At the time of reacquisition, European was making losses of up to $60million. Shortly after Stoddart's return, European Air Charter significantly cut aircraft numbers, and made 560 of its 600 staff redundant.

In December, 2008 the airline ceased operations.

== Continued operations ==
Despite the charter airline business having folded in 2008, its parent European Aviation continues to trade with an extensive aircraft parts and brokerage business operating from Bournemouth Airport and Ledbury, Herefordshire. In 2018, European acquired ten Airbus A340 aircraft from Etihad Airways. In 2020, the aircraft, and owner Stoddart, made the news in the UK during the Coronavirus pandemic in 2020. The Airbus A340 aircraft were used to transport PPE from China and Malaysia back to the UK. These aircraft are now operated by a new UK airline, also owned by European, called European Cargo.

European also developed a VIP aircraft conversion in 2018, based on Boeing 737 aircraft designed for non-stop flights to Dubai.

== Sponsorship ==
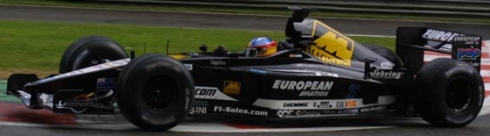
European Aviation branding on the 2001 Minardi of Fernando Alonso

European Aviation was a regular sponsor across Formula One and Formula 3000 during the late 1990s and early 2000s. Initially with the Tyrrell team, and later Jordan Grand Prix and Arrows Grand Prix. In 2001, European Aviation owner Paul Stoddart acquired the Minardi team. It became known as European Minardi, and ran with European branding on the cars alongside the engines being branded as 'European'.

== See also ==
- List of defunct airlines of the United Kingdom
