= 2001 Spanish Grand Prix =

Fifth round of the 2001 Formula One season

Coordinates: 41°34′12″N 2°15′40″E

Race 5 of 17 in the 2001 Formula One World Championship
← Previous race	Next race →

Race details
- Date: 29 April 2001
- Official name: Gran Premio Marlboro de Espana 2001
- Location: Circuit de Catalunya, Montmeló, Catalonia, Spain
- Course: Permanent racing facility
- Course length: 4.730 km (2.939 miles)
- Distance: 65 laps, 307.323 km (190.962 miles)
- Weather: Overcast, Mild, Dry, Air Temp: 18°C
- Attendance: 91,000

Pole position
Driver	(Germany) Michael Schumacher	Ferrari
- Time: 1:18.201

Fastest lap
Driver	(Germany) Michael Schumacher	Ferrari
- Time: 1:21.151 on lap 25

Podium
First	(Germany) Michael Schumacher	Ferrari
Second	(Colombia) Juan Pablo Montoya	Williams-BMW
Third	(Canada) Jacques Villeneuve	BAR-Honda

The 2001 Spanish Grand Prix (officially the Gran Premio Marlboro de Espana 2001) was a Formula One motor race held on 29 April 2001, at the Circuit de Catalunya in Montmeló, Catalonia, Spain, before 91,000 spectators. It was the fifth round of the 2001 Formula One World Championship, and the circuit hosted its 11th Spanish Grand Prix. Ferrari's Michael Schumacher won the 65-lap race from pole position. Williams's Juan Pablo Montoya finished second for his first Formula One podium finish and British American Racing's (BAR) Jacques Villeneuve finished third.

Going into the race, Ferrari's Michael Schumacher and McLaren's David Coulthard shared the lead of the World Drivers' Championship, but Ferrari led McLaren in the World Constructors' Championship. Michael Schumacher set the fastest lap in the one-hour qualifying session, securing pole position. He held the lead until the two pit stop cycles, when Coulthard's teammate Mika Häkkinen took the lead each time round due to his longer stints than Schumacher's. Häkkinen took the lead after the second round of stops because McLaren told him to push to get ahead of Schumacher, whose rear tyres began to vibrate. Häkkinen led the race and appeared set to win until his clutch failed on the final lap due to a hydraulic leak. Michael Schumacher took the lead and won by 40 seconds over Montoya.

Electronic driver aids including traction control, fully automatic gearboxes, and launch control became legal for the first time since the 1993 season at the Spanish Grand Prix. Schumacher's win was his third of the season and his 47th overall. As a result, he led the World Drivers' Championship by eight championship points over Coulthard and 22 over Rubens Barrichello. With 12 races left in the season, Ferrari expanded their lead in the World Constructors' Championship to 18 championship points over McLaren and 32 championship points over Williams.

== Background ==
The 2001 Spanish Grand Prix was the fifth of seventeen Formula One races in the 2001 Formula One World Championship, held on 29 April 2001, at the 4.730 km (2.939 mi) clockwise Circuit de Catalunya in Montmeló, Catalonia, Spain, the track's 11th Spanish Grand Prix. Before the race, Ferrari driver Michael Schumacher and McLaren driver David Coulthard were tied for the World Drivers' Championship lead with 26 championship points each. Ferrari's Rubens Barrichello was third on 14 championship points, followed by Williams's Ralf Schumacher and Sauber's Nick Heidfeld with 12 and 7 championship points. Ferrari led the World Constructors' Championship with 40 championship points, and McLaren were second with 30. Williams were third with 12 championship points, followed by Jordan on 10 and Sauber on 8.

Two months before the start of the Grand Prix weekend, the Fédération Internationale de l'Automobile (FIA; Formula One's governing body) and all the teams agreed to legalise electronic driver aids such as traction control, fully-automatic gearboxes, and launch control from the Spanish Grand Prix to end long-standing rumours of cheating by teams in Formula One, because of the extreme difficulty of policing such systems since the methods of doing so could not detect the difference between traction control and torque mapping and to clarify which electronic systems were legal. The FIA previously prohibited these devices at the end of 1993, fearing that technology would reduce driver abilities. The return of electronic driver aids was the major point of discussion heading into the race. Several drivers voiced displeasure with the systems' return, but engineers and manufacturers observed that it provided an opportunity for them to demonstrate their technical skills. Drivers tried the new technology as they left the pit lane during free practice.

Following the San Marino Grand Prix on 15 April, all teams tested aerodynamics, electronic driver aids, engines, mechanical car components and tyres at various European racing circuits to prepare for the Spanish Grand Prix. The British-based teams of Benetton, British American Racing (BAR), Jaguar, Jordan, McLaren and Williams and the Paris-based Prost team tested at England's Silverstone Circuit from 17 to 19 April. Jordan's Heinz-Harald Frentzen set the first day's fastest lap time, while McLaren's Mika Häkkinen led on the final two days. Sauber, Ferrari and Minardi tested at Italy's Mugello Circuit between 18 and 20 April. Luca Badoer, Ferrari's test driver, topped the first day's running, while Michael Schumacher led the second and final days. Arrows did two days of private straight-line speed aerodynamic testing at Italy's Vairiano Circuit with former Indy Lights driver Jonny Kane, followed by regular driver Jos Verstappen. Sauber's Kimi Räikkönen joined them. Badoer and Barrichello tested several Ferraris for the race at the team's private testing facility, the Fiorano Circuit.

Häkkinen had scored four championship points in the season's first four races due to unreliability and sub-par performances, achieving a then-best result of fourth at Imola. He hoped to extend his winning streak in Spain to four successive victories, adding, "No one is too far ahead and there are still plenty of points to be scored. I hope my championship starts here." His teammate Coulthard said he would be prepared for the race, but was aware of Häkkinen's performance at the circuit and that a victory for the latter would return him to championship contention. Following two subpar races, Michael Schumacher stated that he was not concerned after retiring from the San Marino Grand Prix, but believed Ferrari might regain competitiveness and win in Spain. Williams's Juan Pablo Montoya anticipated a difficult Grand Prix due to his car's pace in recent circuit tests, saying, "I am sure when we get there we will figure it out and hopefully be competitive. It will be quite interesting. For me I am really looking forward to getting to the end of a race to score some points."

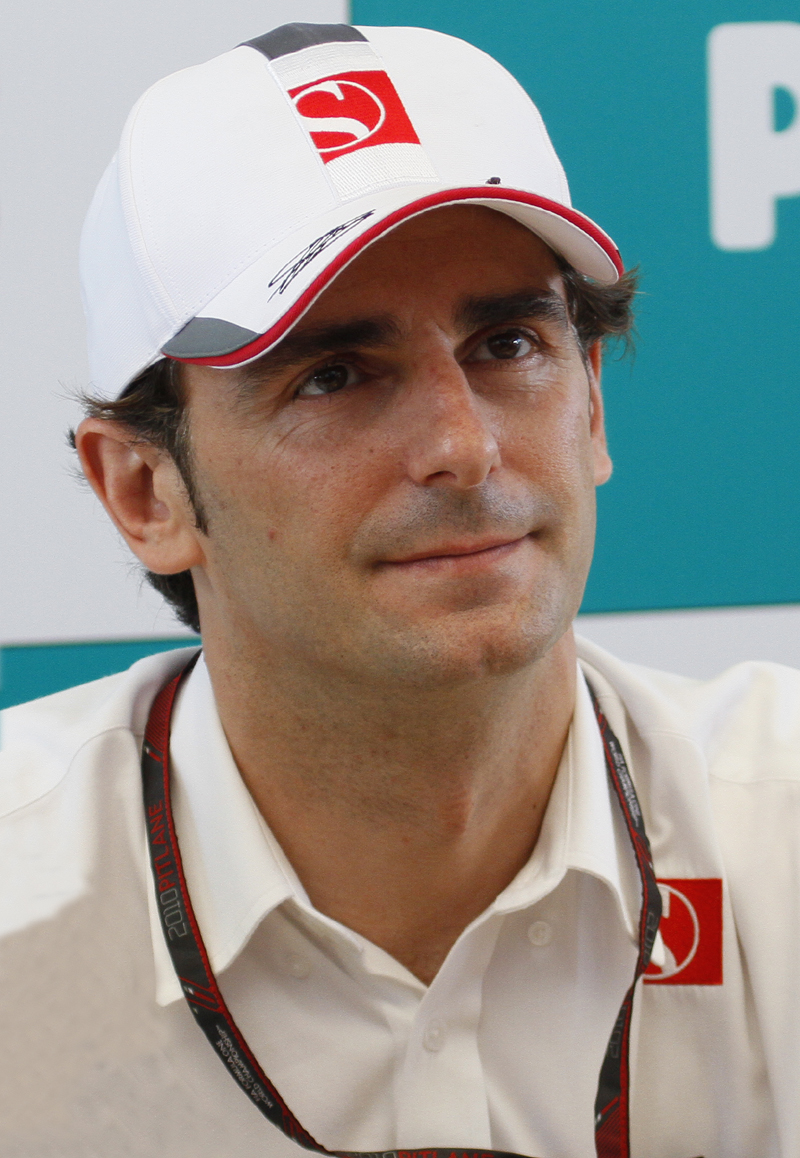
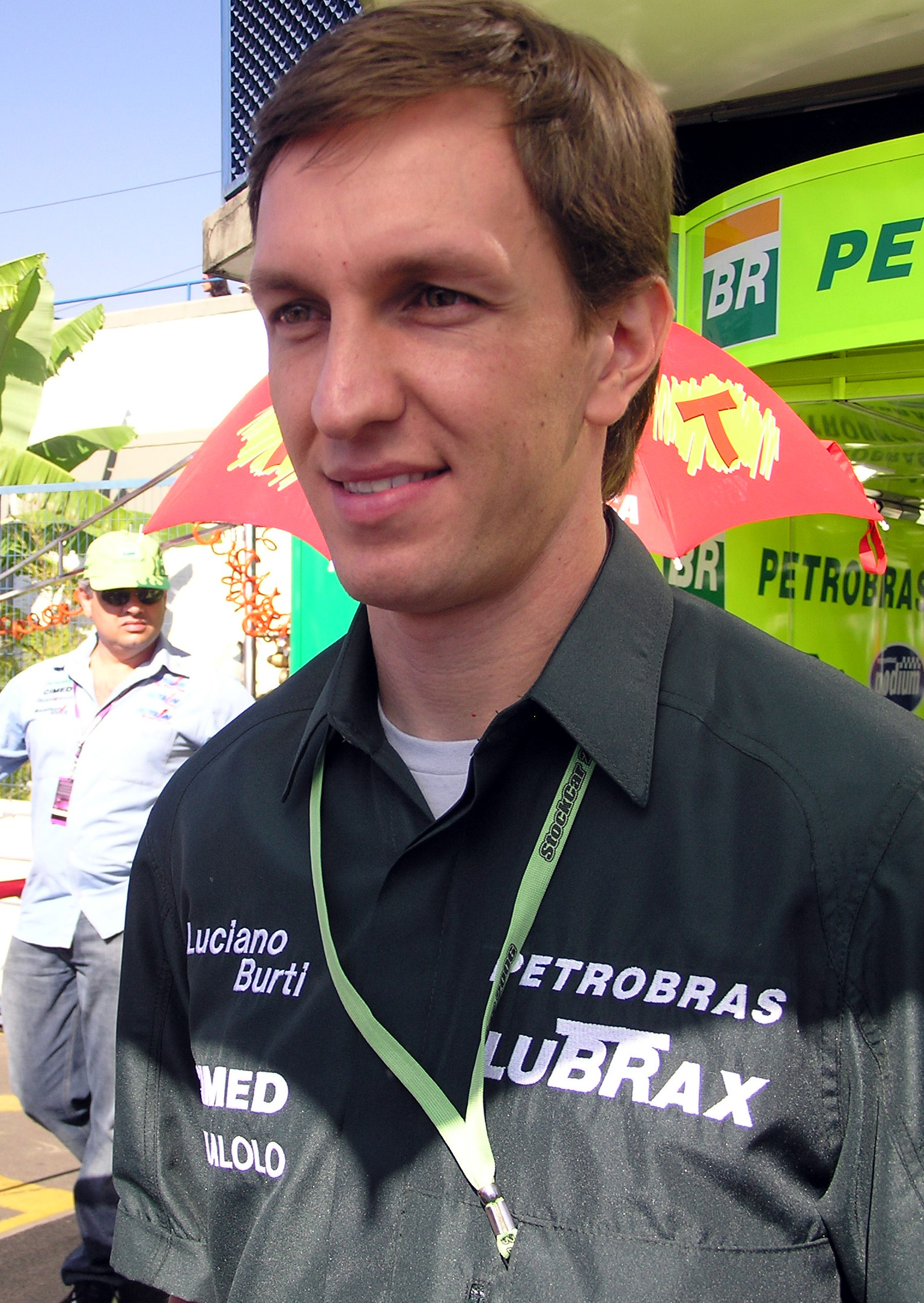
Pedro de la Rosa (left) and Luciano Burti (right) switched roles with De la Rosa being promoted to Jaguar's race team from his test driver role while the driver he took over from Burti replaced the underperforing Gastón Mazzacane at Prost.

The event featured eleven teams (each representing a different constructor) with two drivers each, with two changes from the season entry list. Luciano Burti, who had driven for Jaguar from the beginning of the season, learnt Jaguar had no intention of keeping him at the race team for 2002 and was released and replaced by Pedro de la Rosa, the team's test driver. Burti joined Prost as the second driver change, replacing Gastón Mazzacane, who was sacked by Prost for breaching a performance clause in his contract after being off teammate Jean Alesi's pace. Prost attempted to replace Mazzacane with Jordan test driver Ricardo Zonta, among others, but they declined to join a smaller team. Benetton's Jenson Button had been nursing a shoulder injury he picked up at the Malaysian Grand Prix for more than a month but entered the race after visiting specialists.

Some teams did not use some electronic driver aids in their cars because of reliability issues, and there was less emphasis on cooling the brakes. Teams disputed the legality of the Williams FW23's diffuser after learning of it, but FIA technical delegate Jo Bauer declared it legal. Ferrari employed temperature sensors inside the F2001's wheels to monitor their temperatures and the identical front wing as at the San Marino Grand Prix. McLaren used smaller and cleaner front brake ducts to cool the disc and caliper during qualifying and the race. Sauber's C20 cars remained without power steering because it was deemed too unreliable during testing. BAR tried upward-exiting exhausts on both Olivier Panis and Jacques Villeneuve's 003 cars, as well as a triangular fin behind the front wheels and small gurney flaps on the front wing. Jaguar again installed a revised front wing as seen at Imola. Arrows's spare car included a new front suspension, various steering locations for improved geometry and weight reduction, and redesigned front wing endplates with horizontal flip-up winglets. Benetton, Minardi, Prost and Williams made no external changes to their cars.

== Practice ==
The race was preceded by four practice sessions, two one-hour sessions on Friday and two 45-minute sessions on Saturday. The quickest lap times were recorded early in both Friday sessions' one-hour periods, and the abrasive track surface resulted in heavy tyre wear. The first practice session was held in the morning, in dry and sunny weather following early morning rain. Drivers reported low grip and oversteer, so teams adjusted their traction control systems.

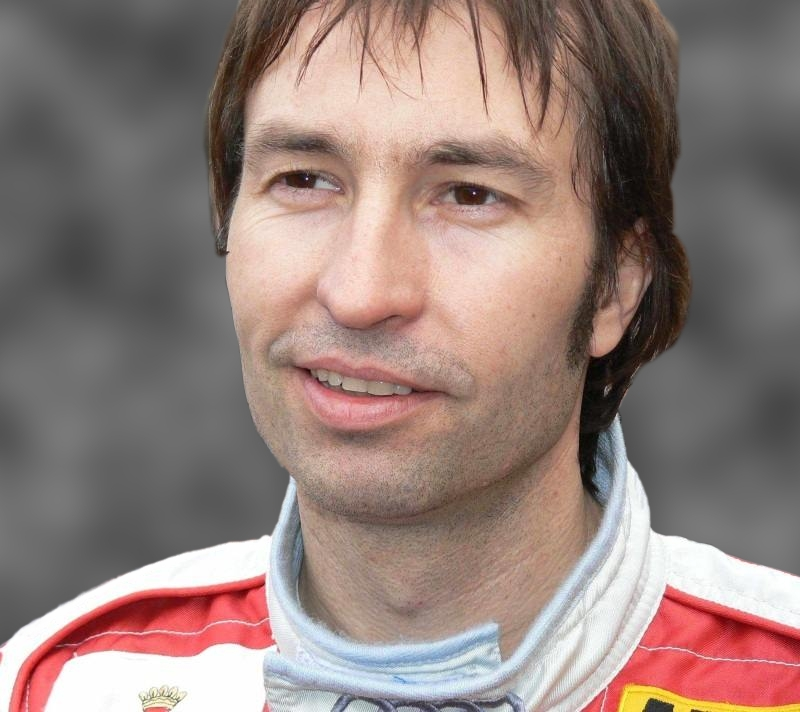
Heinz-Harald Frentzen (pictured as a Deutsche Tourenwagen Masters driver in 2006) crashed his Jordan car against the tyre barrier in the second practice session.

Coulthard led the opening session with a lap of 1:20.107, half a second faster than Barrichello. Michael Schumacher, Ralf Schumacher, Häkkinen and Panis, Montoya, Jordan's Jarno Trulli, his teammate Frentzen and Heidfeld completed the top ten. Montoya spun his car entering turn seven after locking his front-left wheel. Frentzen skidded backwards into the turn seven gravel trap and collided with the tyre barrier. Villeneuve pulled over to the side of the pit lane exit, with flames erupting from his car after an engine failure, probably caused by an electronic driver aid, while performing a standing start with ten minutes remaining. Engine components penetrated Villeneuve's undertray and punctured the tarmac. Jaguar's Eddie Irvine missed most of the session with two hydraulic gearbox leaks.

The weather remained sunny and dry for the second practice session later in the afternoon. Coulthard went quicker than in the previous session and led with a time of 1:20.107, ahead of Irvine, Barrichello, Panis, Michael Schumacher and Häkkinen, who were within a second of Coulthard's time, De la Rosa, Ralf Schumacher, Villeneuve and Trulli. Minardi's Tarso Marques locked his brakes and spun into the gravel 20 minutes in. Montoya stopped at the side of the circuit at turn four when his engine failed for unknown reasons. Häkkinen nearly understeered in turn ten early in the session, spun late on the uphill turn 11, and continued driving.

The third practice session to setup cars for qualifying took place on Saturday morning in sunny and cool weather. Michael Schumacher was the fastest in the third practice session, at 1:18.634; Häkkinen was second, despite locking his tyres and running off into turn one's gravel trap before returning to the race track en route to the pit lane late in the session. Coulthard, Barrichello, Trulli, Frentzen, Heidfeld, Räikkönen, Ralf Schumacher and Panis followed in positions three to ten.

Michael Schumacher failed to lap quicker in the final session later in the morning, but stayed fastest overall, four hundredths of a second ahead of teammate Barrichello in second. Coulthard, Räikkönen, Heidfeld, Trulli, Panis, Häkkinen, Ralf Schumacher and Villeneuve rounded out the top ten. After ten minutes, De la Rosa was on the pit lane straight with the speed limiter on when his Jaguar unexpectedly veered to the right and into the barrier at the pit lane exit owing to a power steering failure, removing the front-right wheel. De la Rosa's car was stranded, but he was unhurt in the accident.

== Qualifying ==
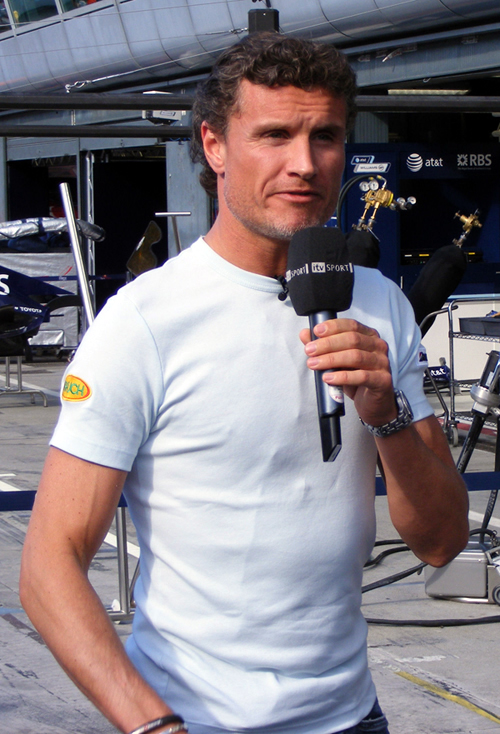
David Coulthard, who qualified third, despite suffering from car balance issues (picture taken in 2007, while driving at Red Bull Racing)

Each driver was limited to twelve laps during Saturday's one-hour qualifying session, with the starting order determined by their fastest laps. The 107% rule was in force during this session, which required each driver to set a time within 107% of the fastest lap to qualify for the race. It was sunny but breezy for qualifying, and with softer tyre compounds and traction control, the quickest lap was six seconds faster than Häkkinen's pole position time in 2000. Michael Schumacher increased downforce in his Ferrari and completed eight of his twelve laps on three sets of soft compound tyres. He secured his fourth pole position in five races of the 2001 season and the 36th of his career with a lap of 1:18.201, a new track lap record set with 15 minutes left on his third set of tyres. Häkkinen turned off traction control to limit understeer in certain parts of the lap, and his quickest lap late in qualifying was 0.085 seconds slower for second. Coulthard took third after being demoted from second by teammate Häkkinen. He could not lap quicker owing to car balance concerns and Heidfeld bulking his final run. Barrichello qualified fourth, setting the same time as in Saturday morning practice. He battled both McLaren drivers for position late in the session. Ralf Schumacher was the highest-placed Michelin-shod entrant in fifth. Jordan's drivers Trulli and Frentzen took sixth and eighth, respectively, on the soft Bridgestone tyre compounds. Trulli had slower cars on his quickest lap while Frentzen improved with each lap despite losing time in the final sector. Villeneuve, seventh, spun into the gravel trap at the end of the pit lane straight due to disconnected rear brakes. He said his rear brakes were not correctly connected for his first run, and was sent out with his car 10 kg (22 lb) overweight due to ballast that should have been removed for his second run with low fuel. The Sauber cars of Räikkönen and Heidfeld were ninth and tenth. Räikkönen regretted not changing his car's setup from practice, but Heidfeld drove the spare C20 car, which had been setup to suit him instead of his teammate due to a driveshaft problem with his race car while on an installation lap for his opening run.

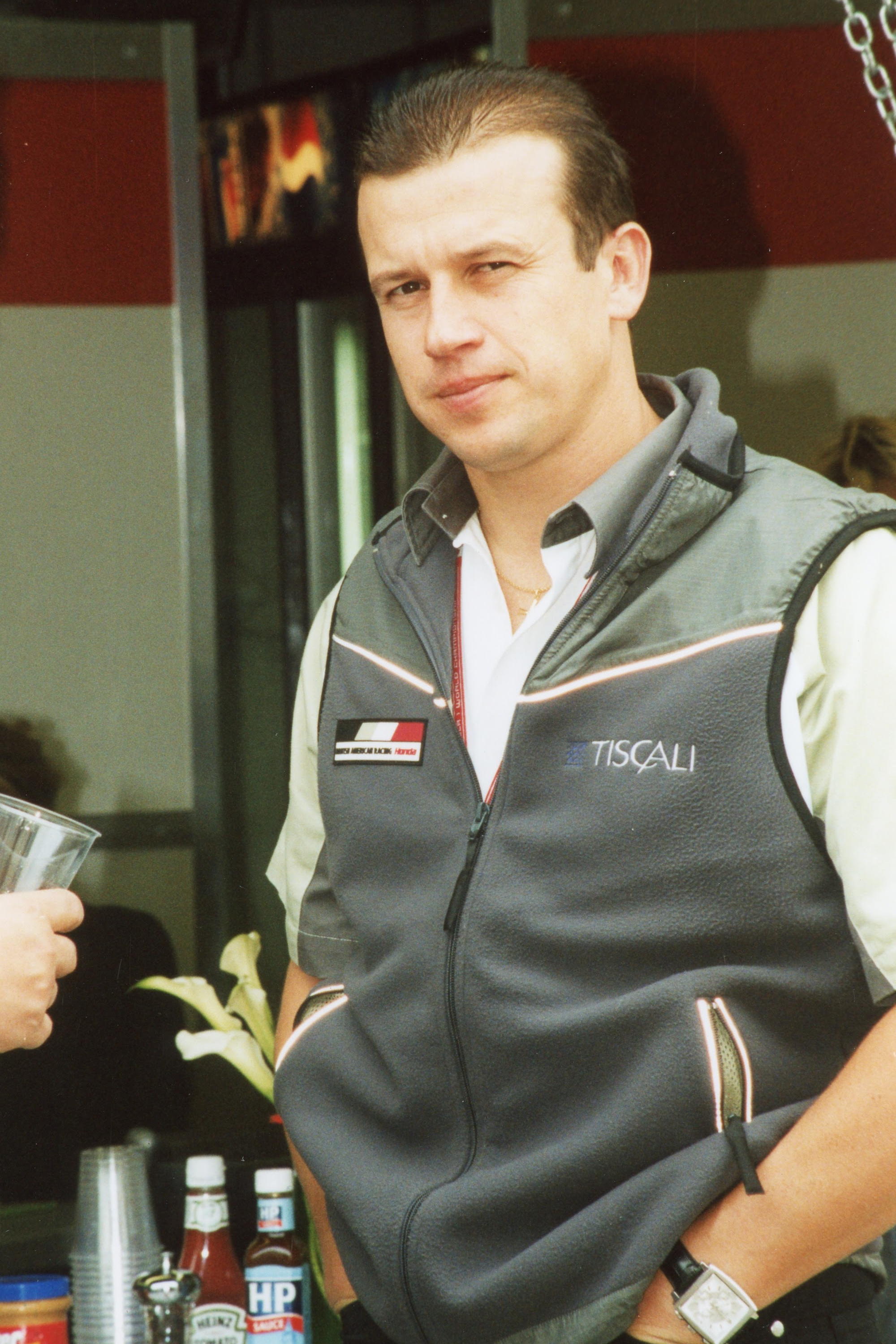
Olivier Panis (pictured in 2002) was the fastest driver to not qualify in the top ten.

Panis in 11th was slowed by De la Rosa and Barrichello on two separate laps. The presence of other cars around him prevented him from setting another fast lap. Montoya, 12th, lost time after Verstappen spun ahead of him and was hampered by other cars. Irvine slipstreamed pole sitter Michael Schumacher down the pit lane straight, allowing him to go faster to qualify 13th. Burti, in his first Formula One qualifying session for Prost, was 14th after the wind hampered his car's balance, making it difficult to record a quick lap. Alesi, his teammate, struggled to find balance and pace in his car, qualifying 15th. Arrows teammates Enrique Bernoldi and Verstappen secured 16th and 17th for the third consecutive race. Bernoldi made no significant alterations to his car's setup and he experienced a minor loss of control. Verstappen spun into the turn four gravel trap on his third run due to a lengthy brake pedal, causing undertray damage. Fernando Alonso was the fastest Minardi driver in 18th place after having his engine replaced due to an oil system issue in morning practice. Benetton's Giancarlo Fisichella took 19th when slow cars hampered his final runs. De la Rosa qualified 20th due to rear brake issues on his final run in the spare Jaguar R2 set up for teammate Irvine while his race car was being repaired following his fourth practice session crash. Button continued to nurse his shoulder injury, and took 21st as the slower Benetton driver because late-qualifying car setup alterations took longer than expected, and he missed the final run. Marques completed the starting order in 22nd. He could not find a proper chassis balance because of excess oversteer in some turns and he lost a lot of time approaching a slower car on his final run, in which he almost spun.

=== Qualifying classification ===
Pos	No	Driver	Constructor	Lap	Gap	Grid
1	1	(Germany) Michael Schumacher	Ferrari	1:18.201	—	1
2	3	(Finland) Mika Häkkinen	McLaren-Mercedes	1:18.286	+0.085	2
3	4	(United Kingdom) David Coulthard	McLaren-Mercedes	1:18.635	+0.434	3
4	2	(Brazil) Rubens Barrichello	Ferrari	1:18.674	+0.473	4
5	5	(Germany) Ralf Schumacher	Williams-BMW	1:19.016	+0.815	5
6	12	(Italy) Jarno Trulli	Jordan-Honda	1:19.093	+0.892	6
7	10	(Canada) Jacques Villeneuve	BAR-Honda	1:19.122	+0.921	7
8	11	(Germany) Heinz-Harald Frentzen	Jordan-Honda	1:19.150	+0.949	8
9	17	(Finland) Kimi Räikkönen	Sauber-Petronas	1:19.229	+1.028	9
10	16	(Germany) Nick Heidfeld	Sauber-Petronas	1:19.232	+1.031	10
11	9	(France) Olivier Panis	BAR-Honda	1:19.479	+1.278	11
12	6	(Colombia) Juan Pablo Montoya	Williams-BMW	1:19.660	+1.459	12
13	18	(United Kingdom) Eddie Irvine	Jaguar-Cosworth	1:20.326	+2.125	13
14	23	(Brazil) Luciano Burti	Prost-Acer	1:20.585	+2.384	14
15	22	(France) Jean Alesi	Prost-Acer	1:20.601	+2.400	15
16	15	(Brazil) Enrique Bernoldi	Arrows-Asiatech	1:20.696	+2.495	16
17	14	(Netherlands) Jos Verstappen	Arrows-Asiatech	1:20.737	+2.536	17
18	21	(Spain) Fernando Alonso	Minardi-European	1:21.037	+2.837	18
19	7	(Italy) Giancarlo Fisichella	Benetton-Renault	1:21.065	+2.864	19
20	19	(Spain) Pedro de la Rosa	Jaguar-Cosworth	1:21.338	+3.137	20
21	8	(United Kingdom) Jenson Button	Benetton-Renault	1:21.916	+3.715	21
22	20	(Brazil) Tarso Marques	Minardi-European	1:22.522	+4.321	22
107% time: 1:23.675

== Warm-up ==
A 30-minute warm-up session was held in warm, breezy conditions on race morning. Most drivers practiced their launch control systems with a standing start. Both Ferrari cars maintained their good pace from qualifying; Barrichello set the fastest time of 1:20.680 on his second run. Michael Schumacher was fourth in the other Ferrari car; Häkkinen and teammate Coulthard were second and third, respectively. Frentzen and Panis completed the top six fastest drivers with identical lap times. With two minutes remaining, Coulthard's engine failed because of a hydraulics failure, resulting in a full shutdown of his McLaren's essential systems exiting the final turn. He moved off the racing line and stopped at the side of the track after the pit lane.

== Race ==
The 65-lap race commenced before 91,000 spectators at 14:00 local time in the afternoon, in cool, cloudy and overcast weather conditions. The air temperature ranged from 16 to 20 °C (61 to 68 °F), and the track temperature was between 17 and 19 °C (63 and 66 °F). Michael Schumacher and both McLaren drivers had new sets of tyres for the race, but two stops gave Schumacher a one-second advantage for two laps after exiting the pit lane. Fisichella drove the spare Benetton car for the race. As the field began the formation lap, Coulthard was left on the starting grid due to an electronic launch control software glitch caused by Coulthard not applying the throttle fully as he commenced the start sequence. He raised his hand to signal he could not start, and a marshal waved a yellow flag behind his car. The mechanics restarted his engine, but he had to start at 22nd and last because the entire field had passed him. Michael Schumacher moved to the inside to prevent Häkkinen from passing him into turn one. Frentzen was temporarily stranded on the grid after turning off his launch control system, dropping from eighth to 22nd as cars swerved to avoid hitting him and caused congestion.

Fisichella hit Coulthard from behind, breaking the latter's front wing, two floor stays, and the mounting point for the rear jack. Coulthard then hit Bernoldi's rear end, and his front wing folded under the McLaren. He drove slowly to the pit lane for a replacement front wing, which took 15.4 seconds, while Bernoldi also made a pit stop for repairs. Coulthard also suffered a severe cut tyre in the accident, which was replaced once his race engineer Pat Fry noticed it. Montoya on the track's middle moved from 11th to sixth by the end of the main straight after the Sauber teammates avoided crashing, while Barrichello fell behind Ralf Schumacher and Trulli. Barrichello overtook Ralf Schumacher and Trulli on the outside at turn two to reclaim third. After the first lap, Michael Schumacher led Häkkinen, Barrichello, Ralf Schumacher, Trulli, and Montoya.

Michael Schumacher and Häkkinen gradually began to pull away from Barrichello, with Schumacher setting successive fastest laps and Häkkinen increasing his pace to stay close behind him but unable to challenge for the lead. Panis overtook Räikkönen for 10th on lap three as Alonso fell to 16th after being passed by De la Rosa and Frentzen due to a driver error. On the next lap, Panis tried unsuccessfully to pass Irvine on the outside for ninth at turn one, On lap six, Frentzen attempted to overtake De la Rosa on the outside at turn ten for 16th, but he lost control of his car's rear on a kerb and understeered. Frentzen's rear wheels flew backwards over De la Rosa's front wing. Both drivers retired from the race in the gravel trap off the circuit. Bernoldi joined the list of retirees when he pulled off onto the grassy side at turn five on lap nine due to a loss of fuel pressure. Coulthard caught and overtook Marques for 18th on lap 13 and Button for 17th three laps later. The first scheduled pit stops began on lap 17. Coulthard passed Fisichella for 15th on lap 18, as Montoya closed up to Trulli in fifth and began battling him.

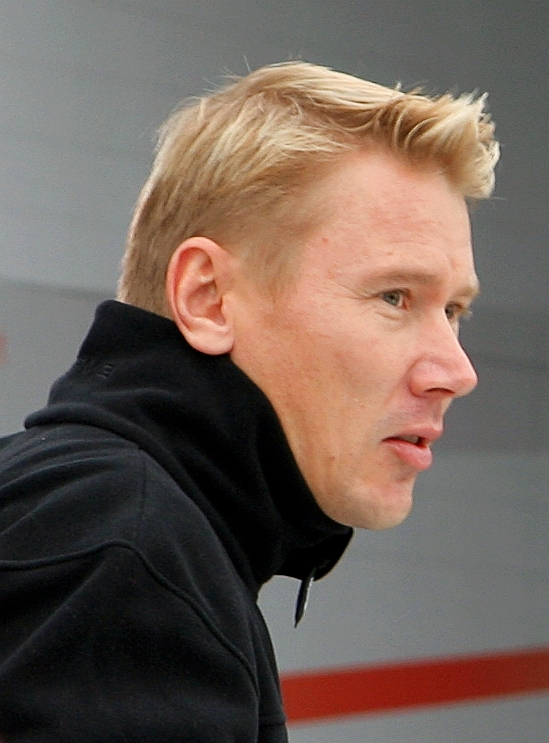
Mika Häkkinen (pictured in 2006) ran longer stints than Michael Schumacher and eventually took the race lead after the second round of pit stops.

Ralf Schumacher in fourth lost control of his car when braking and downshifting for La Caixa turn on lap 21 owing to the rear brakes locking. He spun off into the gravel trap and retired. This moved Trulli to fourth and Montoya to fifth, before both drivers made their first pit stops on the next lap. Swift work from Montoya's crew put him ahead of Trulli. Michael Schumacher made his first pit stop on lap 23. His pit stop took 8.7 seconds, and he returned to the circuit in third. Häkkinen now led, with Barrichello in second. Häkkinen drove stints around three laps longer than Michael Schumacher, resulting in more fuel in his car. He began to push hard, but Schumacher's speed on new tyres and a full tank of fuel allowed him to negate his weight advantage. Panis's pit stop on lap 25 was difficult since he stalled due to an electronic issue before exiting the pit lane after a brief delay.

Barrichello made his first stop from second on the same lap and rejoined in third, behind teammate Michael Schumacher. Häkkinen made his first pit stop on the 27th lap. His pit stop was slower than Michael Schumacher's and the latter retook the lead on the pit lane straight as Häkkinen exited the pit lane in second, failing to overcut Schumacher. Coulthard moved up the field through McLaren's tactics. He entered the pit lane from eighth on lap 28 and rejoined in 11th. Following the first round of pit stops, Michael Schumacher continued to lead from Häkkinen, Barrichello, Montoya, Villeneuve and Trulli. The race resembled a procession for the next 12 laps as Michael Schumacher and Häkkinen's margin varied while they lapped slower cars. Montoya made a driver error at turn ten on lap 37, but instead of retiring, he chose to slow down slightly.

The second round of pit stops began on lap 39. Trulli made a pit stop on lap 40, dropping from sixth to tenth. On the following lap, Montoya and Villeneuve made their second pit stops simultaneously, and Montoya went ahead, with Villeneuve trailing Coulthard. On lap 43, Michael Schumacher entered the pit lane for his second planned pit stop, leading Häkkinen by 4.2 seconds. His stop took 9.3 seconds, rejoining with no other car around him in third with enough fuel to finish the race. Michael Schumacher was unable to duplicate his earlier performance due to a vibration from his Ferrari's rear tyres shifting on the rims of which the cause could not be found, resulting in poor balance. This kept him from pushing hard, and Ferrari suspected tyre delamination, so they advised him to slow to avoid having to make a third pit stop for a new set of tyres. Barrichello's second pit stop came on lap 45 and he maintained third. Two laps later, Häkkinen's pit board displayed a message about the gap between himself and Michael Schumacher, as well as an instruction to push in order to open up a big enough gap with a series of fast laps to pass the latter following his second pit stop.

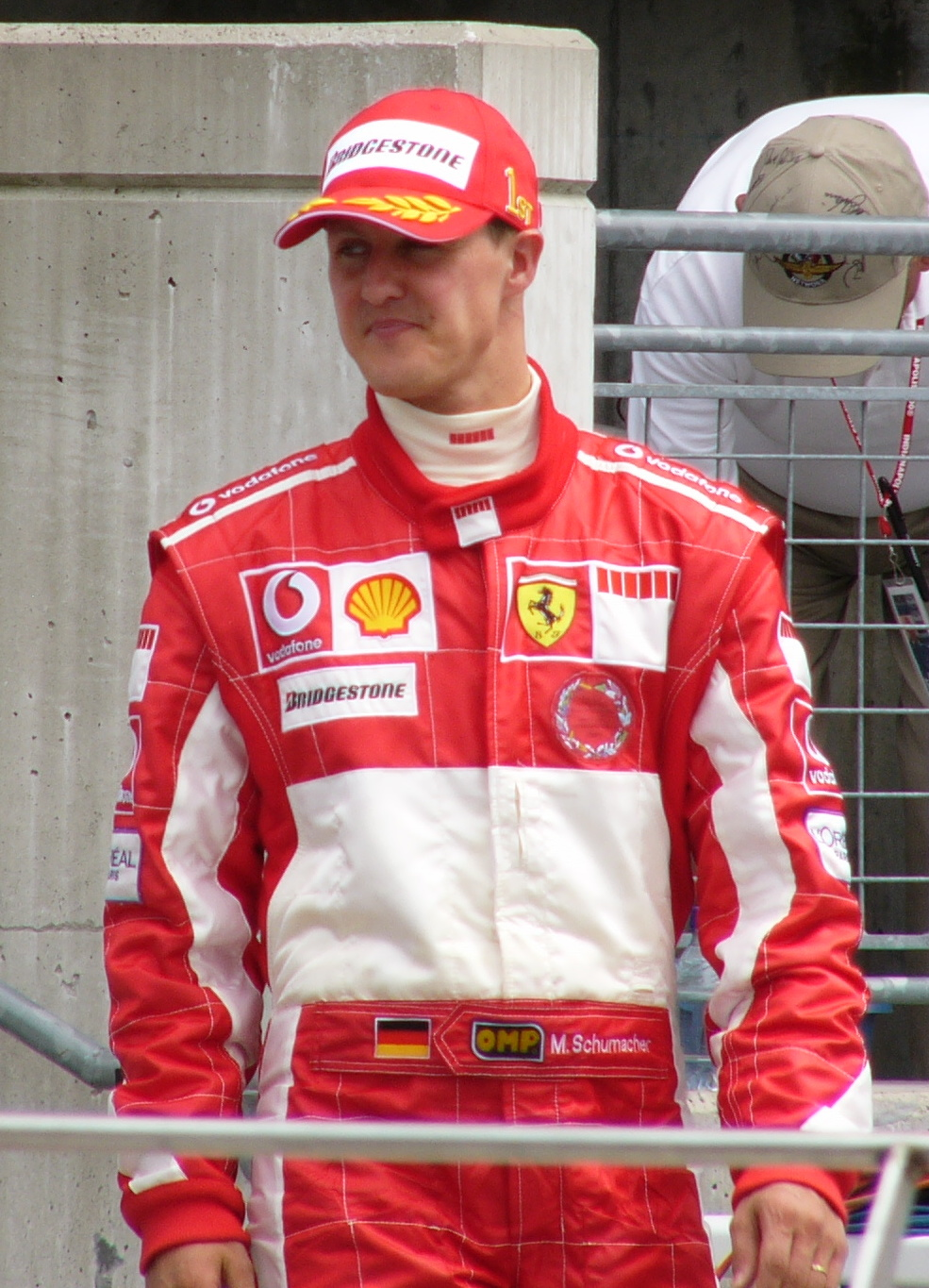
Michael Schumacher (pictured in 2005) benefited from a clutch failure that afflicted Häkkinen to take his third win of the 2001 season.

On lap 49, a right-rear suspension fault caused Barrichello to lose control of his car and run into the turn seven gravel trap. He entered the pit lane for a new set of tyres and fell to seventh before returning to the pit lane to retire with a damaged suspension on his Ferrari the following lap. This promoted Montoya to third and Villeneuve to fourth. On lap 50, Irvine pulled off to the side of the circuit on the pit lane straight after losing engine oil pressure. Häkkinen had a 26-second lead when he made his second pit stop on the next lap. He successfully overcut Michael Schumacher on his second attempt and he exited the pit lane in the lead, 3.5 seconds ahead of Michael Schumacher, who lost 4.8 seconds over seven laps due to car vibrations and slower cars. Button passed Marques for 15th and last on lap 52. Nine laps later, Coulthard slipstreamed Button's car, which he and Heidfeld were lapping for extra speed, and withstood Heidfeld's outside defence to move into sixth on the main straight entering turn one.

In the final laps, Häkkinen extended his advantage over Michael Schumacher to 42 seconds as Schumacher slowed to try to finish second, and it appeared that the latter would win the race for the fourth consecutive year. However, just as Häkkinen began the last lap, his clutch began to slip and then failed unexpectedly on the start/finish straight due to a hydraulic leak. He had to drive slowly around the track before pulling off at the exit of turn seven on the uphill run to Campsa corner, with smoke pouring and metal debris from his McLaren's rear. Michael Schumacher was thus promoted into the lead, which he maintained to claim his third victory of the season and the 47th of his career. Montoya took his first Formula One race finish and maiden career podium in second. On strategy, Villeneuve finished third, securing BAR's first podium since the team's debut in 1999 and his first since the 1998 Hungarian Grand Prix. Although he had brake and gearbox troubles, Trulli finished fourth. He was less than half a second ahead of Coulthard in fifth. Heidfeld completed the points scorers in sixth. Panis's stall at his first pit stop left him seventh. An understeer meant Räikkönen was eighth. Despite not finishing the race, Häkkinen was classified ninth. Alesi and Burti, the two-stopping Prost duo (with underpower steering), finished 10th and 11th. Verstappen finished 12th despite having to push harder to extract car performance due to front-end issues after his first pit stop. The Minardi pair of Alonso in 13th and Marques in 16th raced difficult-to-handle cars due to track conditions, while Marques experienced severe understeer that worsened throughout the race. They were separated by Benetton teammates Button and Fisichella in 14th and 15th.

=== Post-race ===
The top three drivers appeared on the podium to collect their trophies and spoke to the media in the subsequent press conference. Michael Schumacher told Ferrari technical director Ross Brawn "we have been bloody lucky, But you have to finish and we did it, so good job." Although Schumacher was pleased with his race performance, he expressed sympathy over Häkkinen's retirement, saying, "I simply said sorry and I wanted to apologise. It belongs to him to be sitting here, he hasn't made any mistakes and sometimes racing is hard but to some degree that's the way racing is. It's a shame for him it happened so short before the end, if it happens sometimes 20 laps in the race it's less hard to take but this way must be very shocking for him". Montoya felt it "really exciting" to get his first podium result and he did not expect to finish on the podium, "The start was really good and moved me up a lot of places and then I just kept pushing all day long." Villeneuve thought his third place finish as "the boost that everyone was needing" given the amount of effort BAR had done over the previous three years. He added that the team could not go any quicker since his car was difficult to drive.

After the race, Coulthard stopped at Häkkinen's car and gave him a lift back to the closed parc fermé in the pit lane on his sidepod. It was the first time a driver had lost a race victory after retiring on the final lap since Nigel Mansell in the 1991 Canadian Grand Prix. Häkkinen admitted to being "super disappointed" over his last lap retirement, "goddamn it, you know – Jesus. It could have been a fantastic finish for me – it was going so easy. I didn't even have to push. I was just more or less cruising but it just didn't work out this time for me." He added, "I thought about it. I thought 'Wow, I'm going to win for the fourth time in Barcelona. If that happens it's incredible. Then on the last lap I said 'Okay, now I understand, it can't be this good to be true. Sometimes things just don't go like you want them to go." Häkkinen would eventually win two races over the course of the season.

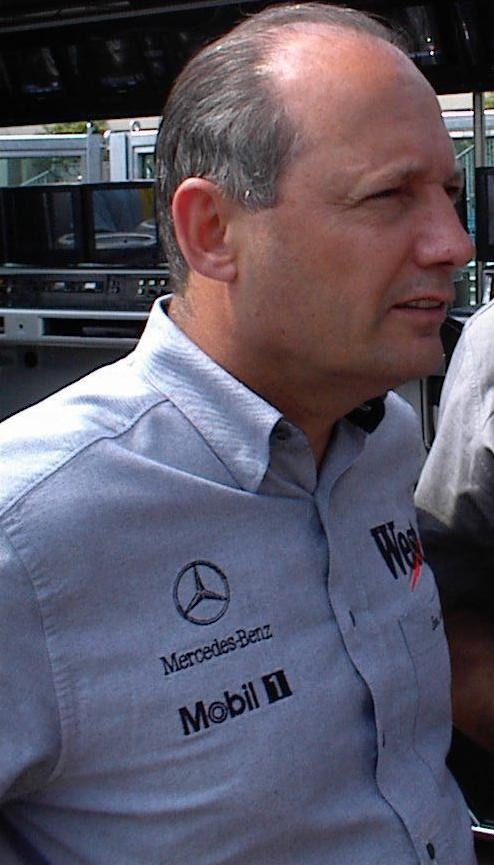
Ron Dennis (pictured in 2000) accused Coulthard of having "brain fade" but later withdrew his remark following analysis of the driver's stall.

McLaren team principal Ron Dennis inaccurately told British television station ITV that Coulthard's stall before the formation lap was due to "a bit of brain fade" inside the car. When Coulthard was informed about the comment, his response was "I think it's fair to say that Ron has had a bit of brain-fade to make that comment without talking to me or the engineers first." McLaren technical director Adrian Newey said it was unfair to blame Coulthard and that it was a situation the team had not rehearsed properly. Coulthard reportedly confronted Dennis about his remark in the garage. Following further deliberations, Dennis later withdrew his comment about Coulthard after McLaren's final review of the telemetry determined that a software glitch caused Coulthard's stall. Former driver John Watson said Dennis's comments "was both an unprofessional and stupid thing" and that he should have located the problem and given his comment some proper thought. Coulthard later stated that there was no need to remedy the issue because it was resolved shortly after the race, and his launch control system software was modified to prevent him from stalling again.

Brawn said Ferrari strategy and his calculations may have allowed Michael Schumacher to win the race if the driver had not been hindered by tyre vibrations after his second pit stop, saying, "It would have been very close." Trulli dedicated his fourth-place finish to fellow Italian Michele Alboreto who died in a sports car accident at the EuroSpeedway Lausitz in Germany in the week of the Grand Prix. Barrichello stated that he was confident he would have finished on the podium if he had not retired due to a rear suspension issue. De la Rosa and Frentzen had different perspectives on their collision. De la Rosa stated that he attempted to provide space but had little room to manoeuvre. Frentzen, however, blamed De la Rosa for not looking to his side, claiming that he had passed him when the accident happened.

Michael Schumacher retook the lead in the World Drivers' Championship with 36 championship points after the race. Coulthard was second with 28 championship points, 14 ahead of third-placed Barrichello and 16 ahead of fourth-placed Ralf Schumacher. Heidfeld maintained fifth with eight championship points. Ferrari extended their World Constructors' Championship lead with 50 championship points. McLaren remained second with 32 championship points, while Williams held third with 18 championship points. Jordan (13 championship points) and Sauber (9 championship points) remained fourth and fifth respectively with 12 races remaining in the season.

=== Race classification ===
Drivers who scored championship points are denoted in bold.

Pos	No	Driver	Constructor	Tyre	Laps	Time/Retired	Grid	Points
1	1	(Germany) **Michael Schumacher**	**Ferrari**	B	65	1:31:03.305	1	10
2	6	(Colombia) **Juan Pablo Montoya**	**Williams-BMW**	M	65	+40.738	12	6
3	10	(Canada) **Jacques Villeneuve**	**BAR-Honda**	B	65	+49.626	7	4
4	12	(Italy) **Jarno Trulli**	**Jordan-Honda**	B	65	+51.253	6	3
5	4	(United Kingdom) **David Coulthard**	**McLaren-Mercedes**	B	65	+51.616	3^{1}	2
6	16	(Germany) **Nick Heidfeld**	**Sauber-Petronas**	B	65	+1:01.893	10	1
7	9	(France) Olivier Panis	BAR-Honda	B	65	+1:04.977	11	
8	17	(Finland) Kimi Räikkönen	Sauber-Petronas	B	65	+1:19.808	9	
9	3	(Finland) Mika Häkkinen	McLaren-Mercedes	B	64	Clutch/Engine	2	
10	22	(France) Jean Alesi	Prost-Acer	M	64	+1 Lap	15	
11	23	(Brazil) Luciano Burti	Prost-Acer	M	64	+1 Lap	14	
12	14	(Netherlands) Jos Verstappen	Arrows-Asiatech	B	63	+2 Laps	17	
13	21	(Spain) Fernando Alonso	Minardi-European	M	63	+2 Laps	18	
14	7	(Italy) Giancarlo Fisichella	Benetton-Renault	M	63	+2 Laps	19	
15	8	(United Kingdom) Jenson Button	Benetton-Renault	M	62	+3 Laps	21	
16	20	(Brazil) Tarso Marques	Minardi-European	M	62	+3 Laps	22	
Ret	2	(Brazil) Rubens Barrichello	Ferrari	B	49	Suspension	4	
Ret	18	(United Kingdom) Eddie Irvine	Jaguar-Cosworth	M	48	Engine	13	
Ret	5	(Germany) Ralf Schumacher	Williams-BMW	M	20	Brakes/Spun off	5	
Ret	15	(Brazil) Enrique Bernoldi	Arrows-Asiatech	B	8	Fuel pressure	16	
Ret	19	(Spain) Pedro de la Rosa	Jaguar-Cosworth	M	5	Collision	20	
Ret	11	(Germany) Heinz-Harald Frentzen	Jordan-Honda	B	5	Collision	8	

Notes

- **^1** – David Coulthard started the race from the back of the grid after stalling on the formation lap.

== Championship standings after the race ==
Drivers' Championship standings

+/–	Pos	Driver	Points
	1	(Germany) Michael Schumacher	36
	2	(United Kingdom) David Coulthard	28
	3	(Brazil) Rubens Barrichello	14
	4	(Germany) Ralf Schumacher	12
	5	(Germany) Nick Heidfeld	8

Constructors' Championship standings

+/–	Pos	Driver	Points
	1	(Italy) Ferrari	50
	2	(United Kingdom) McLaren-Mercedes	32
	3	(United Kingdom) Williams-BMW	18
	4	(Republic of Ireland) Jordan-Honda	13
	5	(Switzerland) Sauber-Petronas	9
Sources:

- Note: Only the top five positions are included for both sets of standings.

Previous race: 2001 San Marino Grand Prix	FIA Formula One World Championship; 2001 season	Next race: 2001 Austrian Grand Prix
Previous race: 2000 Spanish Grand Prix	Spanish Grand Prix	Next race: 2002 Spanish Grand Prix
