= 2001 Austrian Grand Prix =

6th round of the 2001 Formula One season

Coordinates: 47°13′11″N 14°45′53″E

Race 6 of 17 in the 2001 Formula One World Championship
← Previous race	Next race →

Race details
- Date: 13 May 2001
- Official name: Grosser A1 Preis von Österreich 2001
- Location: A1-Ring, Spielberg, Styria, Austria
- Course: Permanent racing facility
- Course length: 4.326 km (2.688 miles)
- Distance: 71 laps, 307.146 km (190.852 miles)
- Weather: Sunny, Air: 18 to 19 °C (64 to 66 °F), Track 18 to 32 °C (64 to 90 °F)
- Attendance: 76,000

Pole position
Driver	(Germany) Michael Schumacher	Ferrari
- Time: 1:09.562

Fastest lap
Driver	(United Kingdom) David Coulthard	McLaren-Mercedes
- Time: 1:10.843 on lap 48

Podium
First	(United Kingdom) David Coulthard	McLaren-Mercedes
Second	(Germany) Michael Schumacher	Ferrari
Third	(Brazil) Rubens Barrichello	Ferrari

The 2001 Austrian Grand Prix (officially the Grosser A1 Preis von Österreich 2001) was a Formula One motor race held before 76,000 spectators at the A1-Ring in Spielberg, Styria, Austria on 13 May 2001. It was the sixth round of the 2001 Formula One World Championship and the 24th Austrian Grand Prix as part of the series. David Coulthard driving for the McLaren team won the 71-lap race starting from seventh. Michael Schumacher of the Ferrari team finished second, with his teammate Rubens Barrichello third.

Going into the Grand Prix, Michael Schumacher led the World Drivers' Championship from Coulthard as his team Ferrari led McLaren in the World Constructors' Championship. Michael Schumacher won the 37th pole position of his career by setting the fastest lap time in qualifying. The Williams pair of Juan Pablo Montoya and Ralf Schumacher overtook him at the start of the event. Montoya led the first 15 laps until Michael Schumacher attempted a pass on Montoya that put both drivers wide on lap 16. Montoya relinquished the lead to Barrichello, who held it until a pit stop on the 46th lap. Coulthard took the lead by staying on the circuit three laps longer than Barrichello. He maintained it for the rest of the race to win. Michael Schumacher finished second after Barrichello complied with team orders from Ferrari to cede the position on the final lap.

It was Coulthard's second victory of the season and the eleventh of his career. Due to the result of the race, Coulthard was left within four championship points of the leader of the World Drivers' Championship Michael Schumacher. Barrichello and Ralf Schumacher maintained third and fourth. Sauber's Nick Heidfeld kept fifth. Ferrari continued to lead McLaren by 18 championship points in the World Constructors' Championship and Williams maintained third – both Montoya and Ralf Schumacher failed to finish due to mechanical problems – with eleven races left in the season.

== Background ==
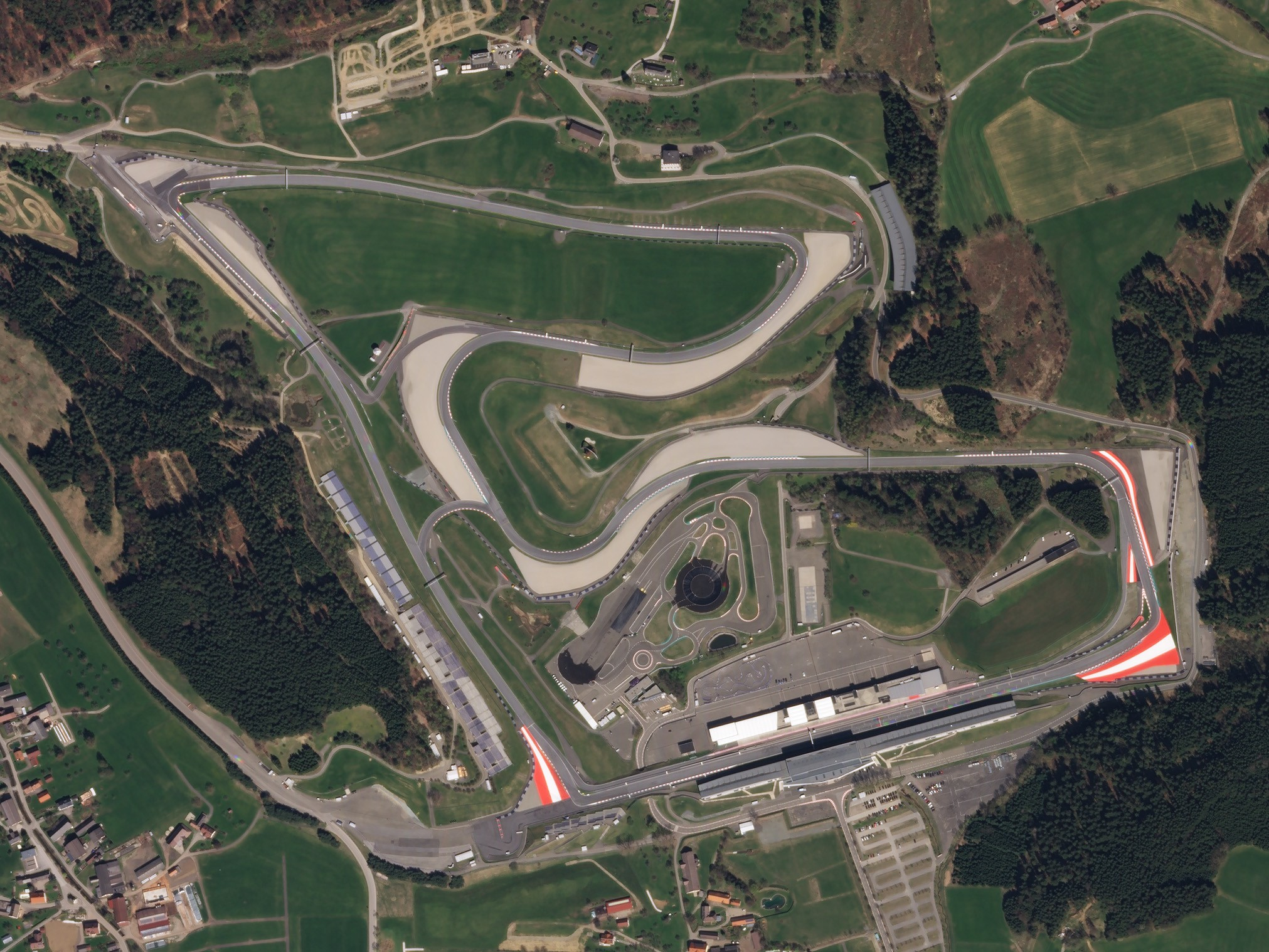
The A1 Ring, now called the Red Bull Ring (pictured in 2018), where the race was held.

The 2001 Austrian Grand Prix was the 6th of the 17 motor races of the 2001 Formula One World Championship and the 24th edition of the event as part of the series. It was held at the nine-turn 4.326 km (2.688 mi) A1 Ring, Spielberg, Styria on 13 May 2001. Redesigned by Hermann Tilke to comply with FIA Grade 1 Circuit License requirements for its Formula One return in 1997, the track is of average length and provides very few low-speed sections. It allowed teams to optimise their engines and ran with little downforce. Teams also ensured that brakes and cooling systems had no excess strain put upon them because of their heavy usage over a single lap. For the Grand Prix, 11 teams (each representing a different constructor) entered two race drivers each.

Following the 2000 race, the Grand Prix organisers extended the length of the kerbs along the side of the track and the gravel traps beside it. An additional row of tyres was erected to improve driver safety. The line demoting the entry to the pit lane was moved from the entry to the final corner to the exit of turn eight. The changes were predicted to affect lap times since cars would have less on-track time and spend more time in their pit stalls.

After winning the preceding Spanish Grand Prix, Ferrari driver Michael Schumacher led the World Drivers' Championship with 36 championship points, eight ahead of David Coulthard in the leading McLaren in second. The second Ferrari of Rubens Barrichello was third with 14 championship points and Williams' Ralf Schumacher was two championship points behind in fourth. With eight championship points, Sauber's Nick Heidfeld completed the top five in the standings. In the World Constructors' Championship, Ferrari led with 50 championship points; McLaren stood in second place with 32 championship points. Williams were third with 18 championship points, as Jordan with 13 championship points and Sauber on nine contended for fourth place.

In preparation for the race, all the teams conducted in-season test sessions at various circuits across Europe. Jaguar, Prost, Benetton, Williams and McLaren went to the Circuit Ricardo Tormo in Valencia from 1 to 3 May. Teams undertook tyre development on behalf of Michelin and Bridgestone, tested their aerodynamic packages; McLaren and Benetton developed the chassis of their MP4/16 and B201 cars. Jordan, Sauber, British American Racing (BAR) and Arrows tested at the Silverstone Circuit in Silverstone from 1 to 3 May, which was disrupted on the first day when Kimi Räikkönen's Sauber was caught off guard by Jordan test driver Ricardo Zonta at the exit to Becketts corner. Sauber assessed launch control for the first time. Minardi tested launch control and a revised electronics package at the Fiorano Circuit in Italy with driver Fernando Alonso, joining Ferrari who utilised the track for car development and reliability testing.

At the previous round in Spain, Coulthard stalled on the starting grid and McLaren team principal Ron Dennis accused him of "brain fade", a remark he later retracted. While Dennis publicly apologised to Coulthard, the relationship between the two was still strained; Coulthard spoke of his hope of continuing to score championship points in every race of the season. The Daily Telegraph columnist Sarah Edworthy said the Austrian Grand Prix was where Coulthard had to demonstrate no driver errors. His manager Martin Brundle stated Coulthard needed to prevent emotions from disrupting his consistency. Michael Schumacher said his focus was to respond to McLaren's challenge and hoped to be competitive in Austria, "Last year I got pushed out of the race at the first corner which was very disappointing. This year I hope things will go better for me. The car should be competitive, the track characteristics are similar to those of the last race in terms of performance."

== Practice ==
There were four practice sessions preceding Sunday's race, two each on Friday and Saturday. The Friday morning and afternoon sessions lasted an hour; the third and fourth sessions, on Saturday morning, lasted 45 minutes each. The Friday practice sessions took place in dry and overcast weather and on a slippery, dusty track. Several drivers spun during the session; all avoided damage to their cars. McLaren's Mika Häkkinen, unwell with the flu, set the first practice session's fastest lap of 1 minute and 11.751 seconds late on, almost three-tenths of a second faster than his teammate Coulthard in second. Barrichello, Räikkönen, Ralf Schumacher, Michael Schumacher, Arrows driver Enrique Bernoldi, BAR's Olivier Panis, the second Arrows of Jos Verstappen and Heidfeld rounded out the session's top ten quickest drivers. Jean Alesi's Prost had an engine failure on the start/finish straight, and Jordan driver Heinz-Harald Frentzen had his running curtailed with a power steering problem.

In the second practice session, Coulthard recorded the day's fastest lap of 1 minute and 11.245 seconds on his final lap of practice. His teammate Häkkinen placed second and Barrichello was the highest-placed Ferrari in third, having been the fastest driver late in the session until both of the McLaren vehicles set their quickest laps. Ralf Schumacher, Michael Schumacher, Heidfeld, Frentzen, Räikkönen and the BAR duo of Panis and Jacques Villeneuve followed in positions four through ten. Jenson Button's Benetton B201 engine failed on the approach to turn two five minutes into practice. Verstappen later spun into the final turn gravel trap and his Arrows teammate Bernoldi lost control of his car returning to the pit lane.

The Saturday morning practice sessions occurred in clear and warm weather. With a time of 1 minute and 10.094 seconds, Michael Schumacher was fastest in the third practice session, ahead of Williams' Juan Pablo Montoya, Häkkinen, Barrichello, Coulthard, Frentzen, Panis, Villeneuve and the Sauber duo of Räikkönen and Heidfeld. Bernoldi ran into the grass by locking his brakes, and Coulthard approached the final corner too quickly, causing him to drive deep into the corner's gravel trap.

Coulthard led the final practice session with a lap of 1 minute and 10.010 seconds. The Ferrari cars were second and third – Michael Schumacher ahead of Barrichello – with Schumacher leading the time sheets until Coulthard's last lap. Häkkinen, Montoya, his teammate Ralf Schumacher, Frentzen, Jarno Trulli, Heidfeld and Villeneuve completed the top ten. Verstappen's right-rear suspension failed at the double left Niki Lauda bend turn, spearing into a gravel trap and a wall beside the track. Ralf Schumacher spun through 180 degrees at the turn two; he continued driving. Later, a deer emerged from the forests and caused Montoya to slow. The deer ran through a gravel trap and left the circuit via a trackside barrier.

== Qualifying ==
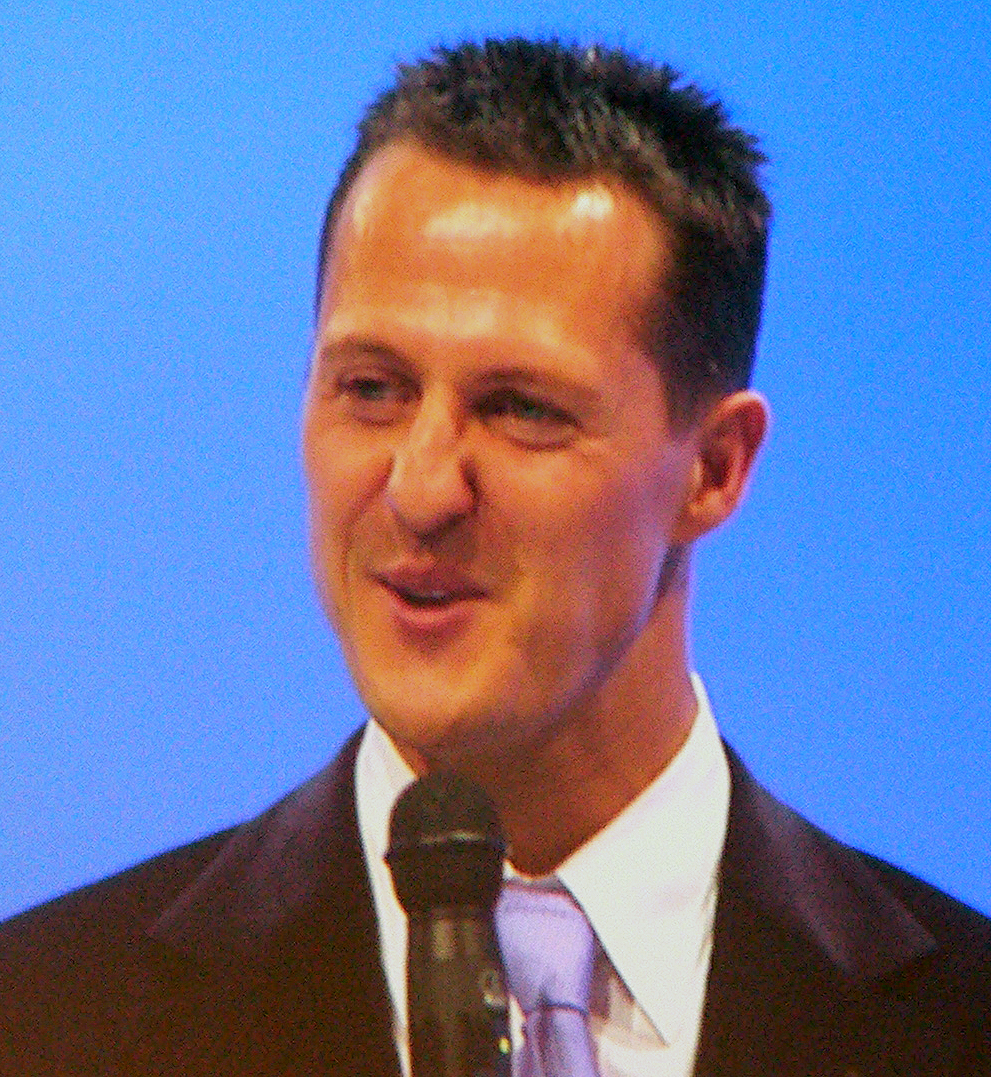
Michael Schumacher (pictured in 2007) took his first pole position in Austria and the 37th of his career.

Saturday afternoon's one hour qualifying session saw each driver limited to twelve laps, with the starting order decided by their fastest laps. During this session the 107% rule was in effect, requiring each driver to remain within 107 per cent of the fastest lap time to qualify for the race. The weather was warm and overcast with a headwind slowing drivers. As the circuit was low on grip due to a lack of usage, drivers waited for 21 minutes before driving on it, leading to heavy traffic. Notwithstanding a driver error at turn two, Michael Schumacher bettered Häkkinen's unofficial lap record from the 2000 race to take his fifth pole position of the season and the 37th of his career with a lap of 1 minute and 9.562 seconds. He was joined on the grid's front row by Montoya who took his maiden front row start. Traffic on his final timed lap, an error on his third, and a slower pace in the final two corners put Ralf Schumacher third. Barrichello in fourth adjusted his car's downforce set-up. Trulli changed his engine after it failed during practice and he drove the final 15 minutes to take fifth. Sixth-placed Heidfeld made minor alterations to his Sauber C20 and experimented with tyre pressures. The McLaren team were seventh and eighth in its worst qualifying performance since the 1997 French Grand Prix. Coulthard in seventh could not improve his lap because of the headwind and a car balance that created oversteer. A minor loss of water pressure in his engine at turn three and on the back straight slowed his teammate Häkkinen in eighth on his final attempt.

Ninth-placed Räikkönen was slowed by Villeneuve on a timed lap and had a recurrence of gearbox shifting problems from the prior two practice sessions. Panis took tenth after confusion over tyre strategy. Frentzen in 11th accidentally engaged his pit lane limiter at his first attempt and his best lap was on his second timed run before his car's balance deteriorated. Multiple errors from an unbalanced setup and weight distribution on his BAR 003 restricted Villeneuve to 12th. Jaguar's Eddie Irvine swerved into the pit lane to avoid hitting Alesi's spun car on his first timed lap and traffic left him in 13th. His teammate Pedro de la Rosa took 14th on his second lap. Bernoldi in 15th was ahead of his teammate Verstappen 16th after a spin at the final corner, which caused Michael Schumacher to swerve into a gravel trap. Burti and Alesi qualified their Prost cars in 17th and 20th, both complaining of a lack of car grip. Alonso separated the two drivers in 18th. Benetton's Giancarlo Fisichella in 19th had a misfiring engine and he used the spare car setup for his teammate Button. Car set-up issues and an understeer left Button in 21st. Tarso Marques in the second Minardi car was the final qualifier in 22nd; he spun into a gravel trap and took the team's spare car until a rear damper fault curtailed his running.

=== Qualifying classification ===
Pos	No.	Driver	Constructor	Lap	Gap	Grid
1	1	(Germany) Michael Schumacher	Ferrari	1:09.562	—	1
2	6	(Colombia) Juan Pablo Montoya	Williams-BMW	1:09.686	+0.124	2
3	5	(Germany) Ralf Schumacher	Williams-BMW	1:09.769	+0.207	3
4	2	(Brazil) Rubens Barrichello	Ferrari	1:09.786	+0.224	4
5	12	(Italy) Jarno Trulli	Jordan-Honda	1:10.202	+0.640	5
6	16	(Germany) Nick Heidfeld	Sauber-Petronas	1:10.211	+0.649	6
7	4	(United Kingdom) David Coulthard	McLaren-Mercedes	1:10.331	+0.769	7
8	3	(Finland) Mika Häkkinen	McLaren-Mercedes	1:10.342	+0.780	8
9	17	(Finland) Kimi Räikkönen	Sauber-Petronas	1:10.396	+0.834	9
10	9	(France) Olivier Panis	BAR-Honda	1:10.435	+0.873	10
11	11	(Germany) Heinz-Harald Frentzen	Jordan-Honda	1:10.923	+1.361	11
12	10	(Canada) Jacques Villeneuve	BAR-Honda	1:11.058	+1.496	12
13	18	(United Kingdom) Eddie Irvine	Jaguar-Cosworth	1:11.632	+2.070	13
14	19	(Spain) Pedro de la Rosa	Jaguar-Cosworth	1:11.752	+2.190	14
15	15	(Brazil) Enrique Bernoldi	Arrows-Asiatech	1:11.823	+2.261	15
16	14	(Netherlands) Jos Verstappen	Arrows-Asiatech	1:12.187	+2.625	16
17	23	(Brazil) Luciano Burti	Prost-Acer	1:12.206	+2.644	17
18	21	(Spain) Fernando Alonso	Minardi-European	1:12.640	+3.078	18
19	7	(Italy) Giancarlo Fisichella	Benetton-Renault	1:12.644	+3.082	19
20	22	(France) Jean Alesi	Prost-Acer	1:12.910	+3.348	20
21	8	(United Kingdom) Jenson Button	Benetton-Renault	1:13.459	+3.897	21
22	20	(Brazil) Tarso Marques	Minardi-European	1:13.585	+4.023	22
107% time: 1:14.431

== Warm-up ==
The drivers took to the track on Sunday morning for a 30-minute warm-up session in dry weather. All drivers fine-tuned their race set-ups against the weather of the time, set laps in their spare cars and Jaguar and Williams tested their launch control systems. Both McLaren drivers improved from qualifying: Häkkinen recorded a lap of 1 minute and 11.647 seconds to go fastest. Coulthard and Frentzen were second and third and the Ferrari pair of Barrichello and Michael Schumacher fourth and fifth, the latter stopped at the exit of the pit lane with fire erupting from the rear of his car. Positions six through ten were occupied by Trulli, Räikkönen, Villeneuve, De la Rosa and Heidfeld. An engine problem prompted Villeneuve to switch into the spare BAR 003 car for the race.

== Race ==
The 71-lap, 307.146 km (190.852 mi) race took place in the afternoon from 14:00 Central European Summer Time (UTC+02:00) before 76,000 spectators. The weather at the start was dry and warm, with the air temperature from 18 to 19 °C (64 to 66 °F) and the track temperature between 18 and 32 °C (64 and 90 °F); forecasts four days beforehand predicted rain showers and lower ambient and track temperatures. At the start, both Jordan cars of Frentzen, Trulli, Häkkinen's McLaren and Heidfeld's Sauber were stationary on the grid with launch control system faults. That prompted several drivers to swerve to prevent a pile-up. In the meantime, Montoya moved ahead of the slow starting Michael Schumacher for the lead since the starting grid provided more grip than the pit lane exit on which Schumacher's launch control system had been tuned. Ralf Schumacher then got past the Ferrari driver to move into second on the approach to turn one. Coulthard made a fast getaway, moving from seventh to fifth after Michael Schumacher held him off into first turn. At the first lap's conclusion, the safety car was deployed since track marshals were unable to clear the grid of stranded cars in time for all of the circulating drivers to come by at racing speed. Of the stalled cars, Frentzen retired with a broken gearbox, Häkkinen did a solitary exploratory lap once the safety car was withdrawn at the end of lap three before retiring and Trulli and Heidfeld began from the pit lane. Some mechanics had attempted to illegally restart the stalled cars in the pit lane's fast lane.

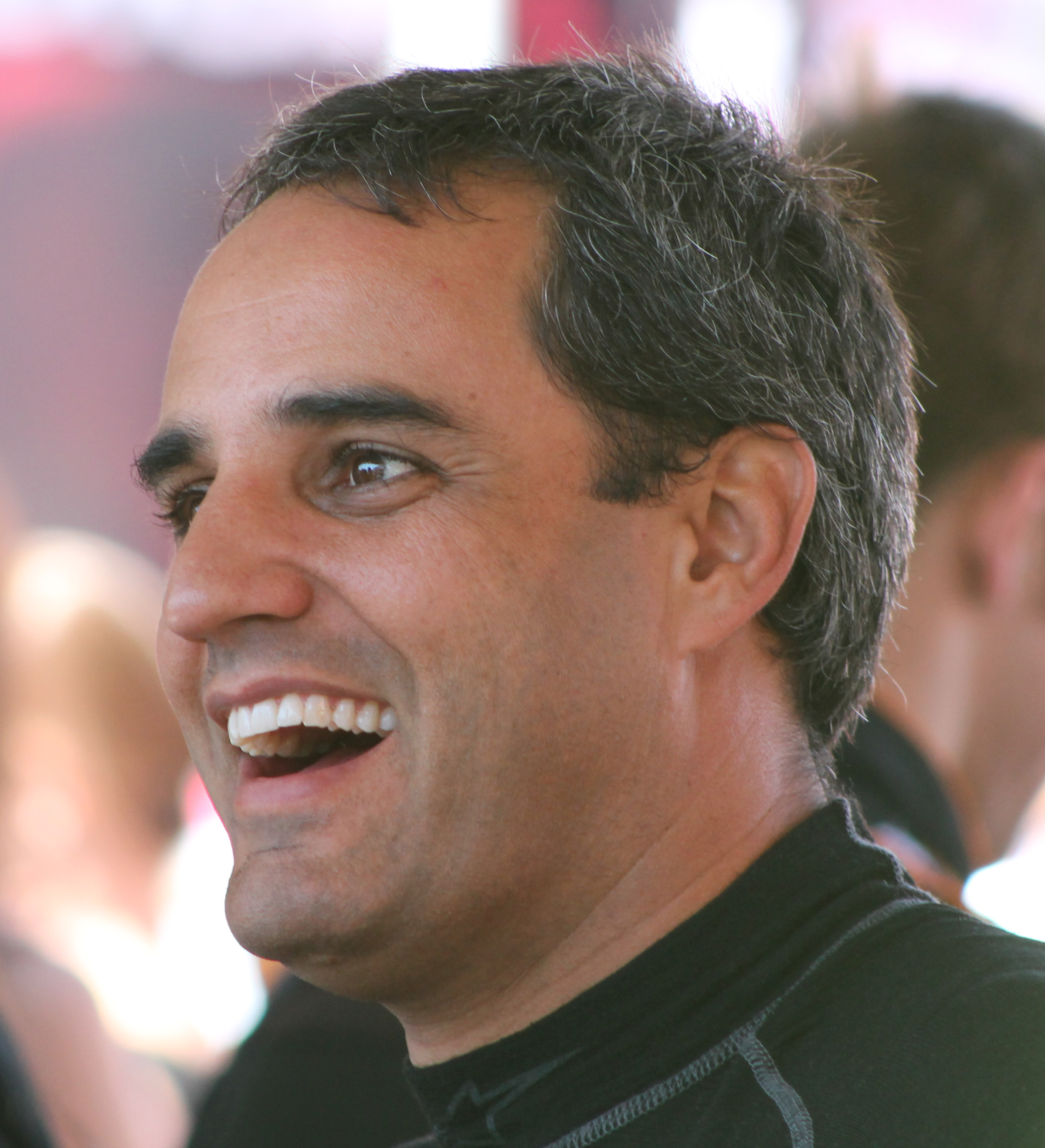
Juan Pablo Montoya (pictured in 2014) led the first 16 laps until he ran wide defending from Michael Schumacher.

Montoya maintained the lead over his teammate Ralf Schumacher in second and Michael Schumacher in third after the safety car drove into the pit lane at lap three's conclusion. On lap four, Verstappen overtook Räikkönen and Irvine to move to sixth as he set an early fastest lap of 1 minute and 14.059 seconds because he was on a light fuel load. That same lap, Fisichella joined the list of retirees by his race engineer instructing him over the radio to enter the pit lane with a misfiring engine. Verstappen then bettered his own fastest lap to a 1-minute and 13.282 seconds on the following lap as he passed Coulthard for fifth. During the fifth lap, Trulli went into final corner's gravel trap, and Heidfeld overtook him for 18th. An attempt by Barrichello to pass his teammate Michael Schumacher on lap six almost resulted in contact at the second turn. That allowed Verstappen to challenge Barrichello; he could not overtake him. On lap seven, Panis passed Irvine for seventh and stopped a counterattack from the latter.

Two laps later, Ralf Schumacher began to lose pressure in his rear brakes and fell back from his teammate Montoya; he struggled against Michael Schumacher and Barrichello. Bernoldi passed Irvine and Villeneuve on the same lap. On lap 10, Villeneuve lined up a pass on Irvine for 10th and the two made contact halfway through the first corner, causing Villeneuve to spin and relinquish 11th place to Dde la Rosa. Ralf Schumacher fell to seventh before he entered the pit lane at the end of the lap to retire. This promoted Michael Schumacher into second, his teammate Barrichello third and Verstappen fourth. At this point, a higher rate of tyre degradation of his Michelin compounds slowed Montoya, allowing Michael Schumacher to close up and forming a group of cars composed of Schumacher, Barrichello, Verstappen, Coulthard and Räikkönen.

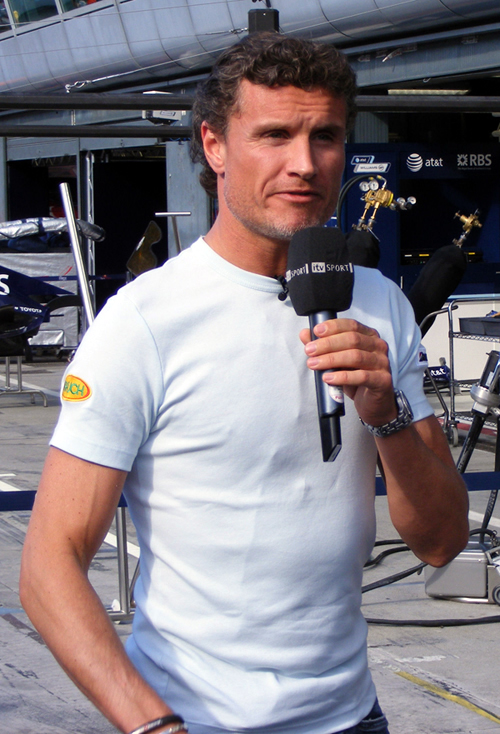
David Coulthard (pictured in 2007) took the lead from the 47th lap and maintained it for his second victory of the season and the 11th of his career.

Over the next four laps, Montoya held off attempts from Michael Schumacher to overtake; his Williams car was quick on the straights. On the 14th lap, Trulli was shown a black flag to inform him he had been disqualified from the race because he ignored the red light to indicate that the pit lane was closed and going into the queue behind the safety car. The top six drivers were covered by two seconds at the start of lap 16. As the field drove towards turn two, Michael Schumacher drew alongside Montoya on the right going into the turn and then steered left for the corner itself, putting Montoya on the track's centre. Montoya braked later than Michael Schumacher, locked his rear tyres and went off the racing line to block on the dirty part of the circuit, causing him to run into the gravel trap with the latter trapped to his left. Michael Schumacher ran wide onto some grass to avoid colliding with Montoya; he dropped to sixth and Montoya seventh. Barrichello took the lead with Verstappen second and Coulthard third. Bernoldi retired in the garage with a hydraulic system failure on lap 17 as Burti was overtaken by his teammate Alesi for 12th. Six laps later, after dropping away from Barrichello, Verstappen made the first of two pit stops, rejoining the circuit in seventh. In the meantime, Michael Schumacher set a series of fast lap times to get closer to Panis. He lost momentum behind Panis but overtook him around the inside for fourth on lap 25.

On lap 26, Marques pulled off to the side of the track to retire with a gearbox failure. Two laps later, Michael Schumacher caught Räikkönen, slipstreamed him and made a pass for third place going into Gosser corner with no counter-challenge. On the same lap, Alesi overtook De la Rosa for 10th and Button got ahead of Burti for 12th on the lap after. By lap 35, Michael Schumacher set a new official track record of 1 minute and 11.179 seconds as he drew to within a second of Coulthard in second. Panis ran wide on the entry to the final corner at the end of the following lap and gave Montoya fifth. At this point, Coulthard and Michael Schumacher lapped half a second faster than race leader Barrichello as Michael Schumacher came to within a tenth of a second of Coulthard, whom he was unable to overtake. Two more retirements occurred during this stage of the Grand Prix: Alonso had a gearbox fault on the 39th lap and Montoya stopped on an escape road with a loss of hydraulic pressure two laps later.

On the 44th lap, the first round of pit stops for the leaders began when Panis made a pit stop from fifth. He rejoined in sixth and Verstappen entered the pit lane on the next lap. Michael Schumacher and Räikkönen stopped at the end of lap 46. Coulthard led when Barrichello entered the pit lane on the next lap. Barrichello emerged in second through a fast lap before entering the pit lane, ahead of his teammate Michael Schumacher after the latter lost grip into the final corner and ran sideways onto dirt, losing around 1.6 seconds. Coulthard remained on the circuit for the next three laps by setting the race's overall fastest lap on lap 48 at 1 minute and 10.843 seconds to go faster on a lighter fuel load after driving conservatively earlier in the race. After an eight-second pit stop, Coulthard rejoined the circuit 1.3 seconds ahead of Barrichello in second because he required less fuel to go into his car. On lap 50, De la Rosa retired from 12th with a transmission failure. Two laps later, Villeneuve took a ten-second stop-and-go penalty for speeding in the pit lane during his pit stop; he kept eighth. Further down the field, Heidfeld overtook Button for 11th on the 57th lap.

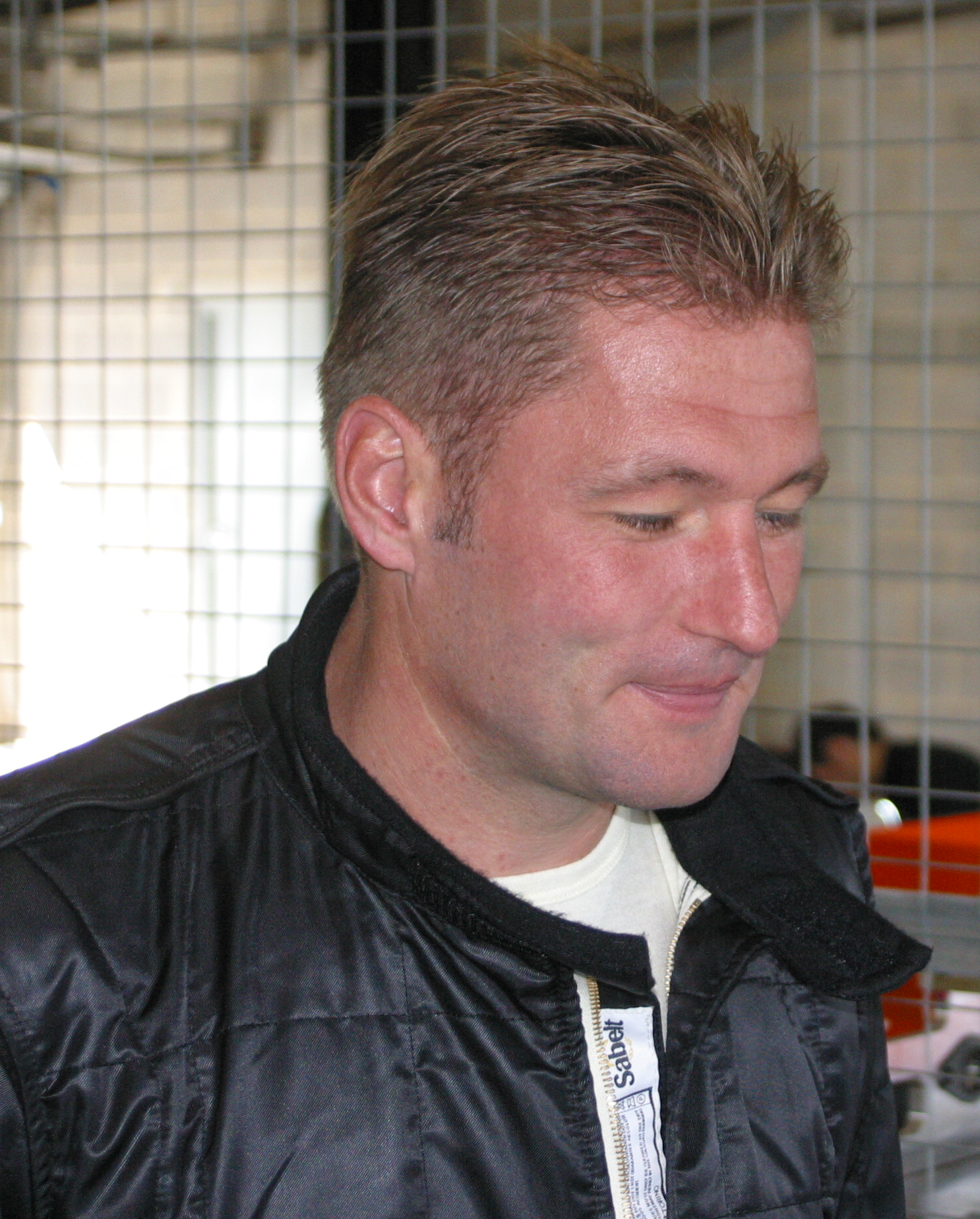
Jos Verstappen (pictured in 2005) finished sixth and scored the sole championship point of Arrows for the 2001 season.

By the 61st lap, Coulthard was a full second in front of Barrichello and was able to keep him out of range for an overtake notwithstanding slower traffic impeding him. Michael Schumacher was a further 1.2 seconds behind in third. Button became the Grand Prix's final retirement with fire emerging from the rear of his car and spun on his own oil at the final turn on lap 63. Six laps later, Ferrari's team principal Jean Todt invoked team orders on Barrichello ("Let Michael pass for the championship") to allow Michael Schumacher past and improve his teammate's status in the World Drivers' Championship. Barrichello ignored repeated instructions from Todt and continued in second; he obeyed at the end of lap 71 by going wide exiting the final corner before the start/finish line and slowing to yield second to Michael Schumacher. After finishing second in every Austrian Grand Prix since 1997, Coulthard increased his advantage to 2.1 seconds by managing his lead and crossed the start/finish line first after 71 laps to take his second victory of the season and the 11th of his career. Raikkonen secured the best finish of his season in fourth. Panis took fifth and Verstappen earned his first championship point of 2001 as he finished in the final points-paying position of sixth. The final finishers were Irvine, Villeneuve, Heidfeld, Alesi and Burti.

=== Post-race ===
Out of respect for Paul Morgan, the managing director of Ilmor Engineering, who was killed in a plane crash at the Sywell Aerodrome in Northampton the day before the race, Coulthard refrained from spraying champagne on the podium. In the subsequent press conference, Coulthard spoke of the importance of driving with a heavy fuel tank, "I was able to lean the engine out early on after the first few laps and save quite a few laps of fuel as well as obviously with the safety car and that enabled us to go quite long." Michael Schumacher said he executed a manual start after a launch control system fault and that his strategy after the collision with Montoya was to wait until the pit stops, adding, "I didn't have much to lose. I could have stayed behind and wait all race until the pit stops. But then I wouldn't have had a chance to have a go to get back up to the lead, which at some stage I thought I could." Barrichello stated he began on used front tyres and unused rear compounds and believed he would have won had Coulthard not remained on track for another three laps, "It was one of those races where I had a good feeling, I had a good car, I was really driving as fast as I could behind him, but there was very little to take away and unfortunately I couldn't go to win again."

Opinions over the application of team orders within Ferrari on the final lap were mixed. Alonso called it "a strange decision" since it was early in the season and the technical director of McLaren Adrian Newey felt it went against Formula One's moral principles. Villeneuve said he was puzzled at those who expressed shock over the order due to Barrichello's status as Ferrari's second driver and the Jaguar team principal and three-time world champion Niki Lauda argued it was the correct decision because of Michael Schumacher's higher placing in the World Drivers' Championship. Ferrari held a post-race meeting with senior staff to discuss the situation. Barrichello later insisted the orders had not demotivated him, "Of course, I was unhappy to be asked to move over. The one thing that makes my life difficult at Ferrari is nothing to do with the team structure or team orders, it is just the simple fact that Michael is a good driver."

The finishing order outside of the top three remained provisional because BAR lodged an appeal with the Fédération Internationale de l'Automobile (FIA)-aligned Royal Automobile Club over its belief Räikkönen overtook Panis under yellow flag conditions necessitated for Button's retirement on lap 66. It came about when the team's protest to the stewards was rejected following a review of video footage resulting in the conclusion there was no incident since it was unreported by track marshals. Craig Pollock, the BAR team owner, explained the appeal was lodged because the constructor sought clarity over the regulation preventing drivers from passing under yellow flag conditions. BAR's appeal was heard by a panel of judges at a meeting of the FIA's International Court of Appeal in Paris on 1 June. The judges upheld the stewards' original verdict and confirmed the race's original result. BAR stated their satisfaction with the result.

Michael Schumacher said he was upset about the incident with Montoya on lap 16 that forced both drivers to lose positions and vowed to speak to the Colombian, "I am a little bit upset obviously because there is no way he could make that corner. He just went off and took me with him. He had lost it anyway and all he could do was do something to me. Sooner or later I would have passed him anyway." Montoya's response was, "If he (Schumacher) thinks he has been granted by divine grace some right which allows him to overtake wherever he wants, I have news for him: he can forget it. He won't intimidate me, because I'm not psychologically fragile as other drivers." After reviewing television footage of the incident, Michael Schumacher told the press he now agreed with Montoya's perspective it was "a racing incident", adding, "It has to be said that, when you sit in the car you don't get the overview of the situation, which you can have looking from outside."

The race result saw Coulthard reduce Michael Schumacher's advantage in the World Drivers' Championship to four championship points. Barrichello remained in third with 18 championship points and he extended his advantage over the fourth-placed Ralf Schumacher to six championship points. Heidfeld continued to round out the top five with eight championship points. In the World Constructors' Championship, Ferrari retained the same 18-point gap over McLaren in second and Williams maintained third. Sauber in fifth made up three championship points over Jordan in fourth with eleven races left in the season.

=== Race classification ===
Drivers who scored championship points are denoted in bold.

Pos	No.	Driver	Constructor	Tyre	Laps	Time/Retired	Grid	Points
1	4	(United Kingdom) **David Coulthard**	**McLaren-Mercedes**	B	71	1:27:45.927	7	10
2	1	(Germany) **Michael Schumacher**	**Ferrari**	B	71	+2.190	1	6
3	2	(Brazil) **Rubens Barrichello**	**Ferrari**	B	71	+2.527	4	4
4	17	(Finland) **Kimi Räikkönen**	**Sauber-Petronas**	B	71	+41.593	9	3
5	9	(France) **Olivier Panis**	**BAR-Honda**	B	71	+53.775	10	2
6	14	(Netherlands) **Jos Verstappen**	**Arrows-Asiatech**	B	70	+1 Lap	16	1
7	18	(United Kingdom) Eddie Irvine	Jaguar-Cosworth	M	70	+1 Lap	13	
8	10	(Canada) Jacques Villeneuve	BAR-Honda	B	70	+1 Lap	12	
9	16	(Germany) Nick Heidfeld	Sauber-Petronas	B	69	+2 Laps	6	
10	22	(France) Jean Alesi	Prost-Acer	M	69	+2 Laps	20	
11	23	(Brazil) Luciano Burti	Prost-Acer	M	69	+2 Laps	17	
Ret	8	(United Kingdom) Jenson Button	Benetton-Renault	M	60	Engine/Spun off	21	
Ret	19	(Spain) Pedro de la Rosa	Jaguar-Cosworth	M	48	Transmission	14	
Ret	6	(Colombia) Juan Pablo Montoya	Williams-BMW	M	41	Hydraulics	2	
Ret	21	(Spain) Fernando Alonso	Minardi-European	M	38	Gearbox	18	
Ret	20	(Brazil) Tarso Marques	Minardi-European	M	25	Gearbox	22	
Ret	15	(Brazil) Enrique Bernoldi	Arrows-Asiatech	B	17	Hydraulics	15	
Ret	5	(Germany) Ralf Schumacher	Williams-BMW	M	10	Brakes	3	
Ret	7	(Italy) Giancarlo Fisichella	Benetton-Renault	M	3	Engine	19	
Ret	3	(Finland) Mika Häkkinen	McLaren-Mercedes	B	1	Transmission	8	
Ret	11	(Germany) Heinz-Harald Frentzen	Jordan-Honda	B	0	Gearbox/Stalled	11	
DSQ	12	(Italy) Jarno Trulli	Jordan-Honda	B	14	Exited pits under red light	5^{1}	

Notes:

- **^1**— Jarno Trulli was disqualified from the Grand Prix for passing a red light at the exit of the pit lane.

== Championship standings after the race ==
Drivers' Championship standings

+/–	Pos	Driver	Points
	1	(Germany) Michael Schumacher	42
	2	(United Kingdom) David Coulthard	38
	3	(Brazil) Rubens Barrichello	18
	4	(Germany) Ralf Schumacher	12
	5	(Germany) Nick Heidfeld	8

Constructors' Championship standings

+/–	Pos	Constructor	Points
	1	(Italy) Ferrari	60
	2	(United Kingdom) McLaren-Mercedes	42
	3	(United Kingdom) Williams-BMW	18
	4	(Republic of Ireland) Jordan-Honda	13
	5	(Switzerland) Sauber-Petronas	12
Sources:

- Note: Only the top five positions are included for both sets of standings.

Previous race: 2001 Spanish Grand Prix	FIA Formula One World Championship; 2001 season	Next race: 2001 Monaco Grand Prix
Previous race: 2000 Austrian Grand Prix	Austrian Grand Prix	Next race: 2002 Austrian Grand Prix
